= Blood Psalms =

South African TV fantasy series

- Genre: Fantasy; Drama; Action; Adventure
- Created by: Jahmil X.T. Qubeka; Layla Swart Najaar
- Written by: Jahmil X.T. Qubeka
- Directed by: Jahmil X.T. Qubeka
- Starring: Bokang Phelane; Mothusi Magano; Sello Maake Ka Ncube; Faith Baloyi; Mandisa Nduna; Zolisa Xaluva; Bongile Mantsai; Richard Lukunku; Enhle Mbali Mlotshwa; S'dumo Mtshali; Albert Ibokwe Khoza; Zikhona Sodlaka; Hlubi Mboya; Faniswa Yisa; Thembekile Komani; Awethu Hleli; Ayanda Makayi; Hamilton Dhlamini; Soso Rungqu; Vusi Thanda; Lemogang Tsipa; Thishiwe Ziqubu; Thabo Rametsi; Siv Ngesi; Warren Masemola; Thandy Matlaila; Khayakazi Kula; Andile Nebulane; Tumie Ngumla; Niza Jay; Khanya Mkangisa; Chuma Sopotela
- Theme music composer: Yogin Sullaphen; Anelisa Stuurman
- Opening theme: Qabela
- Composer: Teane Maseko
- Country of origin: South Africa
- Original languages: isiXhosa; IsiZulu; Setswana; Sesotho; Sepedi; iSwahili; Xitsonga
- No. of seasons: 1
- No. of episodes: 11

Production
- Executive producers: Yolisa Pahle; Nomsa Philiso; Allan Sperling; Fabrice Faux; Nathalie Folloroux; Laurent Sicouri; Cécile Gerardin; Ayanda Wakaba; Phakamisa George; Thabo Shenxane; Rowan Govender; Layla Swart Najaar; Jahmil X.T. Qubeka
- Producer: Layla Swart Najaar
- Cinematography: Willie Nel
- Editors: Louise Bruwer; Layla Swart Najaar
- Running time: 53-89 minutes
- Production companies: Canal+; Showmax; Yellowbone Entertainment

Original release
- Network: Showmax
- Release: 28 September – 7 December 2022

Blood Psalms is a South African epic fantasy television series originally broadcast on Showmax and is a Showmax and Canal+ International co-production. Blood Psalms was created by Layla Swart Najaar and Jahmil X.T. Qubeka of Yellowbone Entertainment., directed by Jahmil X.T. Qubeka and starring Bongile Mantsai, Hamilton Dhlamini, Hlubi Mboya, Mothusi Magano, Warren Masemola, Zolisa Xaluva, Sello Maake Ka Ncube, Thando Thabethe and Faith Baloyi.

== Premise ==
Blood Psalms opens at a time of upheaval in Ancient Africa, around 11,000 years ago. Five tribes – the Akachi, the Uchawi, the Ku'ua, the Chini, and Great Nziwemabwe – whose ancestors all fled the destruction of Atlantis on the back of a great dragon. 1000 years before the story begins, share a prophecy about the end of days. Signs are growing that the end is coming soon. As the five tribes gather for the wedding of King Letsha of the Akachi (Mothusi Magano) – a marriage dreamt up by the scheming Queen Assili (Faith Baloyi) to cement her power over the kingdom – his daughter, Princess Zazi (Bokang Phelane), falls pregnant with a baby who's prophesied to bring about the end of King Letsha's reign, and the destruction of the Akachi civilization.

== The Five Tribes ==
The Akachi, the Uchawi, the Ku’ua, the Chini, and Great Nziwemabwe migrated south from areas in Kemet and Kush (now Modern Sudan) during an apocalyptic event that happened 1000 years before the events of the series.

The Akachi

Partly inspired by the Benin Bronzes of the 15th and 16th centuries, the Akachi empire is proud of their lineage, and wear the armour and uniforms of their ancestors, the ancient people of Kemet. The tribe considers itself the inheritors of the virtues of old Kemet and continue the worship its gods, and the Akachi citadel’s architecture and statues reflect these ancient origins. According to makeup & prosthetics HOD Theola Booyens, "They’re the clean-cut kingdom. Because of a history of plagues and lice, they’re mostly shaven."

The Uchawi

This kingdom is led by a female druidic order, run by council of 12 and headed by a queen mother. The tribe are considered to be rainmakers or controllers of the weather and are revered for their scholarship and expertise in astronomy. The Uchawi rely on other tribes’ royalty to keep them safe in exchange for their council, guidance, and gifts as rainmakers. In their role as the link between this world and the next, the Uchawi talk to the gods through the Emissary, the Serpentine Elementals, and the Nymph. “The Uchawi are the magical scientists of this realm," says producer Layla Swart. "Their homeland was shot in Gwadana, which has a well-known reputation for being the Xhosa birthplace of ‘witchcraft’.”

The Ku’ua

The Ku’ua Kingdom are a patriarchal, nomadic warrior tribe made up of a mixture of soldiers and mercenaries from all over the African continent. Blood Psalms' producer Layla Swart Najaar has stated that within the story, the Ku'ua are treated as the forefathers of Southern Africa's Nguni tribes. Costume designer Pierre Vienings adds, “The Ku’ua is a leather and skin kingdom. Our great warriors are bare-chested. We want to show scarification, we wanted to show their physique and understand that these are the great warriors that travel the plains of Africa."

The Chini

Series creator Jahmil X.T. Qubeka describes the Chini as those who were cast off and rejected from the other tribes during their escape from Atlantis. “Whether they were sickly, whether they were cast out for not adhering to the order. They believe themselves to have turned their back on Kemet. Their way forward is the way of connecting with Mother Earth and its animalistic elements, and more natural elements. Deep down in their caves there’s actually a doorway or an ocean into the world of Sobek,” hints Jahmil.

Jahmil and Albert Ibokwe Khoza, Blood Psalms’ language and cultural advisor and performance coach (who also plays Madlamini) came up with a specific physical movement for the Chini. “The Chini were hyenas, so we came up with the idea that their behaviour would mimic the animals that they transform into. Living underground, in constant hiding, would give them a certain kind of form, and then beyond the form, there will be the connection to the animal spirit. And that will permeate how they behave and how they talk.”

The Great Nziwemabwe

The proud, independent (and some would say arrogant) kingdom of Great Nziwemabwe has a history of war with the Akachi, and although they are now at peace, they will stop at nothing to take advantage of cracks in the Akachi kingdom. Richard Lukunku, who plays Senator Jabari, describes Great Nziwemabwe as this world’s version of Ancient Rome. “Rome is the capital, and the rest of the world is provinces of Rome.”

== Cast ==
=== Main ===
- Bokang Phelane as Princess Zazi, heir to the Akachi throne. Princess Zazi is the daughter of King Letsha and Ndiya Zazi, a Chini woman who was chosen as the vessel for Heka, the god of magic. According to an ancient prophecy, on her 18th birthday, the birth of her child will summon the return of the gods. Nearly 18, Zazi is pregnant by General Toka, the head of the Akachi army.
- Mothusi Magano as the troubled, paranoid King Letsha. King Letsha made a blood pact 18 years back when he sacrificed Ndiya Zazi to Heka at childbirth in the hopes of protecting the Akachi from the prophecy. An emissary Heka tells him that magic will return to the Akachi through his daughter Zazi, but that this return will signal the end of his reign, and King Letsha is convinced that he must kill Zazi before she turns 18.
- Sello Maake Ka Ncube as King Letsha’s scheming uncle, Nkamanzu. Nkamanzu has grown weary of a string of power-hungry Akachi kings. He foresees a democratic solution and a way of uniting the Akachi kingdom through the Akachi council. Once the King descends into madness, though, Nkamanzu tries to return the Akachi to “traditional values”.
- Faith Baloyi as proud Queen Assili of the Uchawi, a sorceress stripped of her powers. Queen Assili is ruler of the mystical Uchawi kingdom and current Magi (chief magic user) of the order following her murder of Ndiya Zazi. Queen Assili supposedly controls the elements but when she cannot bring the rains during a severe drought, she needs to keep her hold on King Letsha through other means, including promising him her daughter Thozama as a bride.
- Zikhona Sodlaka as Sithenjwa, the consort with a deadly secret. Having fled the realm after her attempted murder King Letsha, Sithenjwa had to abandon everything, including her infant daughter Burutti.18 years later she returns as the consort of the Senator of Great Nziwemabwe to find her child and kill the king.
- Mandisa Nduna as brave orphan Burutti, who was adopted by the Chini. Burutti has strange dreams about Princess Zazi, sensing that they are somehow connected. Unbeknownst to her, she is the daughter of Ndiya Zazi’s sister Sithenjwa, and General Toka, the father who put her to sea in a basket as an infant after he exiled Sithenjwa for trying to kill King Letsha. Mother Superior of the Chini tribe found her and raised her.
- Zolisa Xaluva as General Toka, respected head of the Akachi army. Born a Ku’ua, it has taken Toka many years to gain the trust of the Akachi. But he’s a man of many secrets and mistakes, including exiling his wife, abandoning his daughter Burutti, and deflowering and impregnating Princess Zazi. A prophecy warns of a harsh fate for Toka.
- Sdumo Mtshali as Lekoya, second in command to General Toka. Lekoya is a true believer in the Akachi hierarchy and the warrior code of death before dishonour. The Akachi palace schemers have taken note of him as a potential successor to Toka, and are discreetly pulling strings to manipulate him into turning on Toka.
- Albert Ibokwe Khoza as Madlamini, the Akachi palace nurse and governess. On the surface, Madlamini is the nanny to Princess Zazi, having also raised her father, King Letsha, from infancy. Secretly part of the Order of the Golden Dawn, Madlamini vowed to Ndiya Zazi to protect her daughter Zazi at all costs. Madlamini is the ultimate insider and puller of strings in the Akachi palace.
- Enhle Mbali Mlotshwa as Madlamini’s daughter, Umna the circus performer. Disguised as a circus performer hired for the wedding festivities, Umna travels to the wedding with her troupe. Secretly part of The Order of the Golden Dawn, determined Umna is coming to save Princess Zazi.
- Bongile Mantsai as the ambitious Ku’ua warrior Hlengu, the second son of Ku’ua ruler Chief Xemantso. Rude, crude and bloodthirsty, Hlengu resents his father’s treaty with the Akachi and wants the Ku’ua to return to their former warrior glory, which sets him at odds with his level-headed brother Qotha. Everything Qotha has, Hlengu wants, including his wife, Lala.
- Richard Lukunku as Abun Ra Jabari, Senator for the Great Nziwemabwe. A man of mystery, Senator Jabari has been sent from Great Nziwemabwe to attend the King’s wedding, and to insist that the King cede the Northern Territories back to the motherland...or die at the hands of his Golden Army. As a survivor of an Akachi attack that wiped out his village, the Senator despises the “primitive”, war-obsessed tribes of the South.

=== Supporting ===
- Siv Ngesi as Onyo, Lord of the Netherworld. Onyo is a man shrouded in mystery. While not belonging to any tribe, he ends up in the Akachi sacrificial pit...waiting. Onyo has strength and power beyond measure, and is more concerned about his own powers than any enemy.
- Warren Masemola as high priest Mfengetho. Royal aide and right hand to Nkamanzu, Mfengetho is a priest of a high Akachi order. A puppet master, he has various sources of information within the kingdom and manipulates the situations from behind the scenes.
- Hamilton Dhlamini as Ku’ua heir Qotha. The heir to the Ku’ua Chiefdom, Qotha is a calculating man. He prefers rationality and fairness to war, which makes him a weakling in the eyes of the Ku’ua warriors. He is aware that his father prefers his brother Hlengu and struggles to maintain respect within the tribe.
- Vusi Thanda as jolly, loyal Chief Xemantso, leader of the Ku’ua clan and faithful ally of King Letsha. Chief Xemantso made a battlefield pact with King Letsha that they would shed no further blood between the tribes. This truce has his people straining at the leash, but without having to fight and bleed in the rain, Chief Xemantso has gleefully embraced the finer things in life, like sex, drugs and alcohol.
- Soso Rungqu as proud Lala, wife to Qotha. With twice the diplomacy, strategy and intelligence of both of Chief Xemantso’s sons put together, Lala is stuck in a clan that bars women from leadership. She plays her husband against her lover, his brother Hlengu, and is plotting to dispose of Chief Xemantso.
- Thishiwe Ziqubu as Ku’ua warrior Kuthala. Lala’s sister Kuthala is the fiercest warrior of the Ku’ua tribe, but long years of battle have surrounded her with ghosts and left her world and war weary. Lala cuts a bargain with her to assassinate Chief Xemantso.
- Faniswa Yisa as Chini matriarch Mother Superior. Keeper of the ancient secrets, Mother Superior is the matriarch and protector of the Chini people. Cursed along with the others, Mother Superior tries to decode the messages from the gods she has been sworn to protect, as she stands guard at the entrances to the Underworld, the resurrecting Pool Of Zam Zam, and the great stone door to the realm of the gods. Aware that Zazi is the Chosen One, she risks splitting her tribe to protect her and her unborn child.
- Thembekile Komani as Mother Superior’s son, Overseer Mzinzi. The head of the Chini, Mzinzi is a disciplined leader who is ruthless in his quest for respect and rules. He has grown to be at odds with his mother over her indulgence of Burutti’s reckless behaviour, but his main concerns are keeping the Chini safe from the Akachi, keeping the tribe fed, and protecting them during their transformations.
- Awethu Hleli as Ilitye of the Chini. Burutti’s best friend Ilitye knows the underground workings of the Chini cave network the best, as her grandfather created them. She’s often torn between her loyalties to Mzinzi and to Burutti, but often lets Burutti drag her into trouble anyway.
- Niza Jay as Teborah, son of Queen Assili and her husband Ntuka. Teenaged prince Teborah despises his mother. When he is given instruction by the Serpentine Elementals to poison Queen Assili, he accepts the task and heads with his father to the Akachi kingdom for the wedding of his sister Thozama to King Letsha.
- Andile Nebulane As Regent King Ntuka, consort to Queen Assili. Scholar and teacher Ntuka, the stepfather of Princess Thozama, tries to be the voice of reason to power-mad Assili, knowing that the Uchawi are walking a tightrope between powerful nations and kept from destruction only by their science and scholarship.
- Tumie Ngumla as Thozama, King Letsha’s teenaged fiancee and companion to his daughter, Princess Zazi. Thozama is afraid of her mother, and reluctant to do her duty and marry King Letsha. A loyal friend in a palace full of spies, she has done her best to keep Princess Zazi’s secrets...until she lets the most dangerous one of all slip out.
- Thabo Rametsi as the doomed Akachi warrior Captain Ahadi. When a meteorite blazes a hole through the sacred mountain island, Captain Ahadi is sent to explore vortex it creates. His comrades are struck down leaving him alone in an abyss that seems to be a portal to another dimension. When he finally finds a way back home, he finds he has aged 20 years.
- Hlubi Mboya as handmaiden turned queen Ndiya Zazi. Eighteen years ago, Ndiya Zazi, a Chini servant girl who became the true Magi of the Uchawi order, was sacrificed in a plot set in motion by Queen Assili. Unbeknownst to her killers, she was the second coming of the god Heka, and she’s watching over her daughter Zazi from the Netherworld.
- Sello Motloung as Letsha’s father, the Ancient Monarch. The ancient monarch haunts his son, often disapprovingly. He seems unaware that he died on the battlefield.
- Thando Thabethe as the Emissary To the god Heka. The voice of the god Heka on earth, this snake-wielding emissary is summoned only by the Serpentine Elementals to represent the god to whomever makes a sacrifice to see her.
- Khanya Mkangisa as the Nymph. The voice of the Serpentine Elementals, the Nymph speaks out the messages that the elementals interpret from Heka.
- Khayakazi Kula as Ncedisa, an Akachi palace handmaiden. Ncedisa is the wife of Captain Ahadi and mother of their baby son.
- Lemogang Tsipa as Xhosa of the Ku’ua. Xhosa is one of the most expert and level headed of the Ku’ua warriors, and he has a dim view of Chief Xemantso and his sons.
- Ayanda Daweti as Pee-Erot. Part of Umna’s circus and a member of the Order of the Golden Dawn, Pee-Erot secretly takes a dim view of rescuing royalty.
- Ayanda Makayi as Kike the Chini werehyena. Kike one of Burutti’s best friends, is taken prisoner by the Akachi and awaiting his fate as a human sacrifice in their prison pits.

== Episodes ==
No.	Title	Directed by	Written by	Original release date
1	"Fire from Heaven"	Jahmil X.T. Qubeka	Jahmil X.T. Qubeka	28 September 2022
18 years in the past, the god Heka chooses Ndiya Zazi to become the Uchawi’s Magi (high priest) instead of Queen Assili. King Letsha kills his own father on the battlefield (witnessed by General Toka) and forms an alliance with Chief Xemantso. Letsha later marries Ndiya Zazi, but jealous Queen Assili tells Letsha that Ndiya Zazi is carrying his father’s baby, and Ndiya Zazi pleads with her sister Sithenjwa, who’s recently given birth to her own daughter (Burutti) and Madlamini, to raise her baby. Letsha has Ndiya Zazi executed just after she gives birth to their daughter, Princess Zazi. Sithenjwa tries to kill Letsha, and Heka's Emissary tells Letsha that Princess Zazi will fall pregnant at the age of 18, and that the birth will end Letsha’s reign.
2	"Isis Unveiled"	Jahmil X.T. Qubeka	Jahmil X.T. Qubeka	28 September 2022
Assili tells Letsha that she won’t use her power to bring the rains until he kills Princess Zazi. Meanwhile Princess Zazi’s companion Thozama admits to Zazi that she is reluctant to marry King Letsha, and Zazi shares her own fear that the palace’s virginity testers will uncover her pregnancy The Chini Mother Superior announces that the Akachi Princess, who will be the Chini’s saviour, has come of age. Akachi soldiers enter the Chini’s cave complex to try to wipe them out but lose two of their own men instead, and Burutti, an orphan taken in by the Chini, reveals that she feels a psychic link to the Akachi Princess. As high-ranking Akachi, Uchawi, Ku’ua and Great Nziwemabwe guests gather for the wedding, an old man from the Ku’ua warns General Toka that he has a long way to fall. Chief Xemantso ignores his son’s warnings and agrees to pass the night behind the walls of the Akachi citadel. And Burutti slips into the Akachi citadel to free a prisoner.
3	"A Hole in the Wall"	Jahmil X.T. Qubeka	Jahmil X.T. Qubeka	5 October 2022
Sithenjwa returns incognito to the Akachi as the consort and mistress of Senator Abun Ra Jabari of Great Nziwemabwe, and she tells the Senator the legend that the Akachi citadel is built atop an energy vortex created by a dying dragon. Princess Zazi and Thozama, sneaks out to visit Princess Zazi’s lover, General Toka, while Burutti sees the prison pits where the Akachi torture Chini prisoners as an Uchawi witch doctor prepares to sacrifice them to “the great serpent of the sky”. Princess Zazi calls on the goddess Isis and uses her supernatural powers to deflect a meteor before it can destroy the Akachi citadel, and the deflected meteor breaks a hole through the base of an offshore sandstone island that the Akachi regard as the entrance to the Kingdom of the Dead, creating an arch in the sea. General Toka assigns Burutti, who’s disguised as an Akachi soldier, to take Zazi back to her quarters, and Burutti and Zazi recognise one another immediately from their dreams. In the Chini caves, Mzinzi reports to Mother Superior that Burutti has gone missing, and compelled by the power of the full moon, the “afflicted” Chini begin to transform into their were-hyena form.
4	"A Ballad of Burden"	Jahmil X.T. Qubeka	Jahmil X.T. Qubeka	12 October 2022
Assili begs the god Seth for powers before drugging mad King Letsha and tying him to his bed, and Akachi Captain Ahadi goes on a mission to inspect the “hole in the wall”. Thozama accidentally let slip to Queen Assili that Zazi is pregnant by General Toka, and Assili orders Thozama to take advantage of the drugged King Letsha so that Thozama could conceive a baby as a vessel for the god Seth. Princess Zazi helps Burutti to escape the Akachi citadel as the Chini werehyenas (like Burutti) transform, and the dead Chini rise from their graves to attack the living. Qotha and Hlengu bicker over who’s in charge of Daddy’s army while Xemantso is in the citadel. Senator Jabari mocks his Akachi hosts and announces that he’d only accepted the wedding invitation so Great Nziwemabwe could demand the Northern Territories back from the Akachi. And General Toka recognises Senator Jabari’s concubine as his former lover Sithenjwa, who he’d exiled for trying to murder King Letsha. Soon Toka will have to answer for what he did with his and Sithenjwa’s lost daughter, Burutti.
5	"Fire in the Hole"	Jahmil X.T. Qubeka	Jahmil X.T. Qubeka	19 October 2022
Hlengu sneaks into bed with Lala when Qotha goes to check on their father in the Akachi Citadel. Mfengetho warns Nkamanzu that General Toka might stage a coup to install Princess Zazi as a puppet ruler, General Toka dumps Princess Zazi, and Nkamanzu has to keep Jabari from stumbling across the mad king, who’s tied up in his chambers, screaming in fury after Assili tells him that General Toka has impregnated Princess Zazi. Madlamini recognises Sithenjwa, and Princess Zazi accidentally breaks her statue of Isis while practising her powers. Jabari secretly follows Sithenjwa and sees her in bed with General Toka after she confronts him to ask what happened to their daughter. Princess Zazi also sees Toka and Sithenjwa having sex, and Madlamini catches Princess Zazi sneaking back into her quarters. But before they can talk, King Letsha bursts into Zazi’s rooms, naked, insane and dead set on killing Princess Zazi. When he fails, he has the palace guards arrest Princess Zazi for treason.
6	"A Day to a God is a Thousand Years"	Jahmil X.T. Qubeka	Jahmil X.T. Qubeka	26 October 2022
Princess Zazi’s 18th birthday dawns on King Letsha’s wedding day. Captain Ahadi investigates the blue vortex in the sandstone stack created by meteor Princess Zazi deflected, and a pulse of energy kills his two companions. Following a night as a werehyena, Burutti falls out of a tree, naked, in front of mysterious circus performer Umna, but Overseer Mzinzi knocks out Burutti and takes her back into the Chini caves to be punished for endangering the tribe. In the Akachi prison pits, Kike wakes surrounded by the corpses of prisoners, who he killed in his werehyena form. The only survivors are a massive, brooding man who’s secretly Onyo Lord Of The Netherworld, and one sick, old prisoner. Lekoya’s scheming lover points out to him that General Toka has been driving support within the military council for Zazi to take the Akachi throne, while Nkamanzu slyly turns the Akachi council against General Toka, the army, King Letsha, and Princess Zazi. King Letsha orders General Toka’s arrest, torture and beheading, and demands that Zazi abort her pregnancy, but Madlamini urges him not to shed blood on his wedding day, and confides in Princess Zazi that she has a plan to save Zazi and her unborn baby.
7	"The Precession of the Equinoxes"	Jahmil X.T. Qubeka	Jahmil X.T. Qubeka	2 November 2022
Akachi soldiers escort Lala into the citadel for the wedding, where she walks in on Qotha and Chief Xemantso frolicking in a bathing pool filled with concubines. At the temple of Heka, the Nymph urges Prince Teborah to keep his vow to topple Assili from power, but Ntuka and Prince Teborah’s carriage is attacked, set on fire, and overturned on the way to the wedding. Madlamini tells Princess Zazi that her daughter Umna is part of a secret society, The Order Of The Golden Dawn, who’re fighting to keep Zazi alive. And as Umna teaches Princess Zazi her wedding dance, Madlamini and Umna discuss their plan to help Princess Zazi escape during the dance. Senator Jabari barges into the Akachi council room with a fully armed escort from his Golden Army, and Mfengetho reveals his role in sowing the seeds of discontent in Lekoya, as he pays off Lekoya’s manipulative lover. The Akachi soldiers and citizens riot in protest as King Letsha orders the arrest, torture and beheading of General Toka for deflowering and impregnating Princess Zazi, Kike, Onyo, and the sick, old man escape the prison pits during the riot. Lekoya calms the riot at the palace gates, and after Assili forces him to swallow a live snake, the crowd kneel to Lekoya as he charms them.
8	"Götterdämmerung"	Jahmil X.T. Qubeka	Jahmil X.T. Qubeka	9 November 2022
Hlengu plots to frame Qotha for murdering their father. King Letsha whips the skin off General Toka’s back, Lekoya finds the earring that Sithenjwa in the dungeon while consoling Toka. Lekoya parades the battered General Toka through the citadel, sentences Toka to be buried alive for his crimes, and has the Akachi soldiers throw Toka’s sarcophagus off a cliff into the sea, before donning the General’s helmet. A mermaid guides Toka to Captain Ahadi’s boat, and Ahadi, now an old man with a white beard, welcomes General Toka to The Land Of The Dead. Umna swaps places with Princess Zazi during her wedding dance, and the performers smuggle Zazi out of the citadel in their carriage. Chaos erupts when King Letsha cuts out his own tongue in front of his advisors, wedding guests and bride-to-be, Thozama. As Letsha chokes on blood, he has a vision of the bride he murdered, Queen Ndiya Zazi, poised to attack him.
9	"Horus Rising"	Jahmil X.T. Qubeka	Jahmil X.T. Qubeka	16 November 2022
Overseer Mzini and his warriors kill the trespassing Chini who’ve taken Ntuka and Prince Teborah prisoner. Umna is helping Princess Zazi to focus her superpowers when they narrowly escape being seen by an Akachi search party, but Circus performer Pee-erot, Umna’s right-hand man, has sold them out, and the Akachi massacre the performers and recapture Princess Zazi. As Nkamanzu struggles to regain control of the citadel following Letsha’s wedding day self-mutilation, the revelation of Princess Zazi’s pregnancy, and the live burial of General Toka, Senator Jabari dictates a message requesting the aid of the Great Nziwemabwe council, revealing that he’s taking the Akachi throne. Senator Jabari and his men toss a small dragon over the citadel walls before beginning their attack on the Akachi. Lala bribes her warrior sister Kuthala to infiltrate the citadel, kill Chief Xemantso, and frame Qotha for the crime. Nkamanzu scapegoats the recaptured Princess Zazi and the Akachi crowd beat her and strip her naked while Nkamanzo sentences her to death. Burutti’s friend iLitye guides her through the Chini cave complex, and iLitye and Burutti watch in horror from a hidden Chini trapdoor as Princess Zazi is burned at the stake at the temple of Heka.
10	"The Return of the Gods"	Jahmil X.T. Qubeka	Jahmil X.T. Qubeka	23 November 2022
Under the Temple of Heka, Burutti smashes through the ceiling of the Chini cave system to bring down the burned corpse of Princess Zazi, and begs the Chini’s Mother Superior to revive Zazi in their sacred pond, The Swirl of Zam-Zam. But the decision to resurrect Princess Zazi creates a deep rift between the Chini loyal to the Mother Superior, and those loyal to Overseer Mzini. Senator Jabari orders his Golden Army to massacre the Akachi palace guards, watchmen and soldiers, and take the palace servants prisoner, and he greets Thozama, Queen Assili, Mfengetho, and Nkamanzu with a declaration of war when they returned to the Akachi citadel after executing Princess Zazi. Senator Jabari taunts King Letsha and orders his men to kill Letsha’s god-panther, Sekhmet. Sithenjwa saves Qotha from the Golden Army and leads him through the Akachi palace’s secret passages, while Onyo and Kike save General Lekoya from the Golden Army under the citadel. Senator Jabari announces his coup in the Akachi council chamber, and reveals that it was Great Nziwemabwe who brought Assili to power. The Golden Army take Nkamanzu, Madlamini, Prince Teborah, Ntuka, and Chief Xemantso hostage. iLitye knocks Umna unconscious before she can see the Chini resurrect Princess Zazi, and the crocodile god Sobek drags Princess Zazi through a red vortex into dark waters, where a black-winged boatman shows her two visions: one of her mother, Queen Ndiya Zazi, and another showing an eternity of apocalyptic human suffering. When Zazi challenges the boatman, he flings her back into the world of the living through the Swirl of Zam-Zam.
11	"End of Daze"	Jahmil X.T. Qubeka	Jahmil X.T. Qubeka	7 December 2022
The Chini Mother Superior has a vision of an alien resurrecting his Chini experiments, aboard his spaceship. Later in another vision, she sees the same alien break the seal on the stone door between the Chini caves and the Netherworld. King Letsha wakes up screaming behind his muzzle, as Jabari tells him that he’s taken over his kingdom, and Sithenjwa and Qotha eavesdrop as royal hostages Chief Xemantso and Madlamini plead to be released to tend to King Letsha. Captain Ahadi throws himself back into the sea in despair after he visits his wife, Ncedisa, and their baby son, but she doesn’t recognise him as an old man, and General Toka seeing a great crocodile drag his baby daughter into the sea after he set her adrift in a basket. Fleeing an Akachi attack, Mother Superior asks Zazi to read the inscriptions on the stone gate, which Zazi identifies as the Blood Psalm, written in Ana’kh, the Language of the Gods. As Zazi starts to sing the Blood Psalm, a spiral of energy gathers above the Earth and King Letsha and Queen Assili’’s amulets begin to glow. One by one, the characters and their schemes all turn to dust, leaving Letsha weeping and crawling alone in his empty citadel, while Assili sees the sky turn red. Meanwhile Zazi flees when the stone door swings open and the gods emerge, and at the Temple of Heka, the gods tell Zazi that she has ended the world.

== Production ==
Showmax parent company Multichoice announced the project on 30 July 2020. Blood Psalms is a Showmax Original in partnership with Yellowbone Entertainment, Canal+ International, the Department of Trade, Industry and Competition (which delayed funding during production), The National Film and Video Foundation, the Eastern Cape Economic Development Corporation (ECDC) and the MultiChoice Innovation Fund.

=== Development ===
Yellowbone Entertainment's production crew included South African Film and Television Awards (SAFTA) winners like director of photography Willie Nel (Knuckle City, The Story of Racheltjie de Beer) who won the 2023 Best Achievement in Cinematography SATFA for Blood Psalms, production designer Chantel Carter (Kalushi: The Story of Solomon Mahlangu, Fiela Se Kind, The Story of Racheltjie de Beer), costume designer Pierre Vienings (Tsotsi, Five Fingers For Marseilles, Knuckle City), and prosthetics, hair and makeup designer Nicola Roodt (Sink, Semi-Soet), with Addie Vigario as art director, Gerhard van der Heever (District 9, The Mummy, Queen Sono) as special effects supervisor and Wayne Smith (iNumber Number, From a House on Willow Street, Hard to Get) as stunt coordinator. Additional production staff included Albert Ibokwe Khoza as cultural advisor and choreographer, and Musa Xokelelo as sculptor.

=== Filming ===
Blood Psalms was shot in the Eastern Cape, Gauteng and North West provinces throughout 2020. The shoot employed over 1000 South Africans during COVID-19 Lockdown.

Production shot parts of the Akachi Citadel in different locations, including Hole In The Wall near Coffee Bay. The Nqweba Dam in Graaff-Reinet's Valley of Desolation, is incorporated as the Citadel dam.

The Chini scenes were filmed in the Sterkfontein caves complex, in the Cradle Of Humankind in Gauteng, where the Blood Psalms team was allowed to use a “dead” area of the caves 20 metres underground, where they wouldn’t damage biodiversity. Other cave locations included The Bat Cave (or Wonder Cave) at the Cradle of Humankind, and Weltevreden Caves.

Scenes featuring The Uchawi druids and stargazers were filmed at Gwadana hill in the Eastern Cape

== Release ==
The series was first showcased at the Dubai expo in October 2021. The first trailer premiered on 17 August 2022. Blood Psalms had its world premiere in Cape Town on Wednesday August 24 as the opening night screening at MIP Africa, followed by a premiere event in Sandton on Tuesday, 17 September 2022. And the series' first two episodes premiered on Showmax on 28 September 2022
