= Melusi Yeni =

South African actor and singer

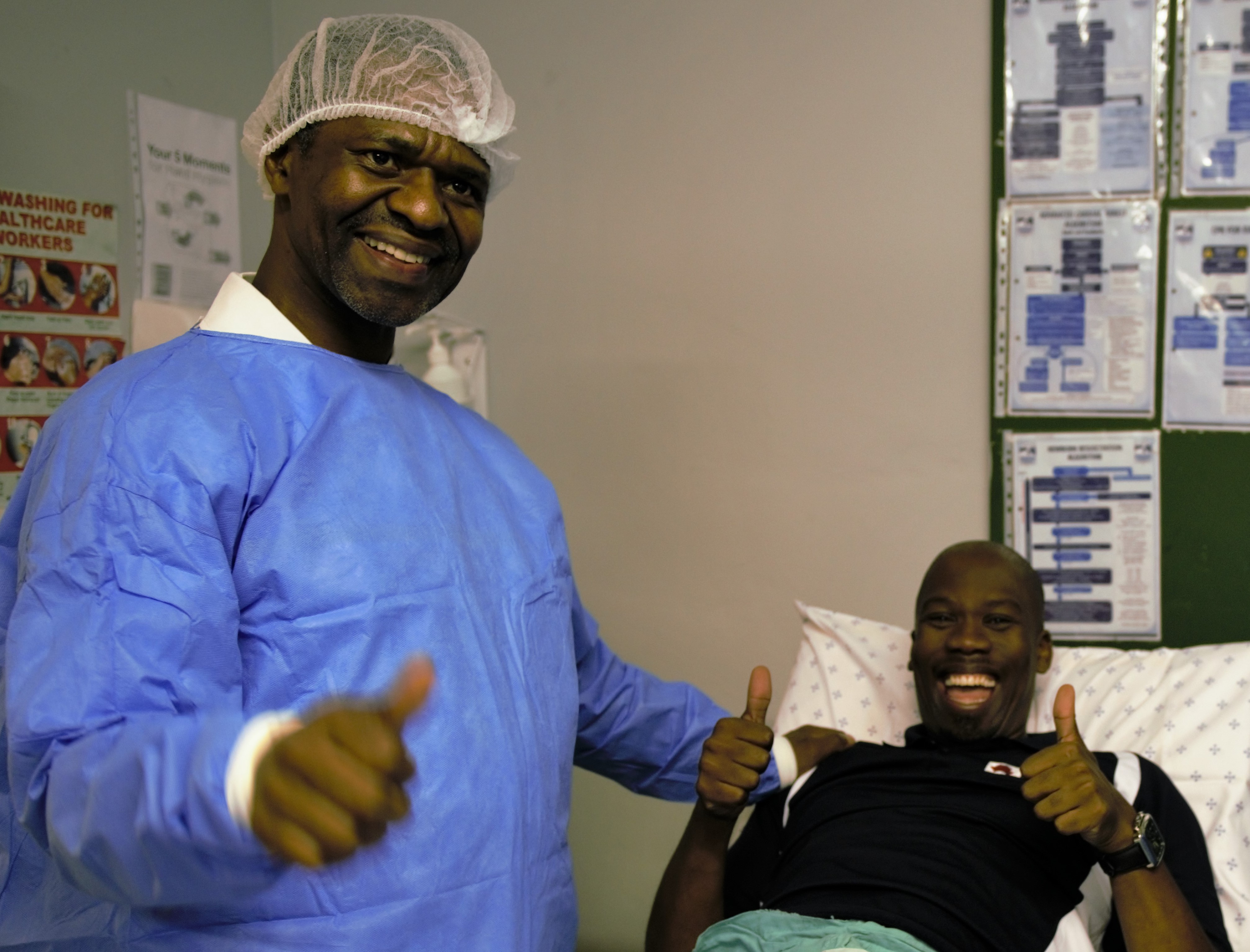
- Melusi Yeni (right) after becoming the 1 millionth VMMC against HIV/AIDS transmission in the province of KwaZulu-Natal in 2018.
- Born: Melusi Yeni; 22 October 1977 (age 48); KwaMashu, South Africa
- Occupations: Actor, Singer
- Years active: 1997–present
- Children: 3

Melusi Yeni (born 22 October 1977) is a South African actor and singer. He is best known for the roles in the television serials Tshisa, Home Affairs, Sokhulu & Partners and Generations.

== Personal life ==
Yeni was born on 22 October 1977 in KwaMashu, South Africa.

In 2016, he was hospitalized due to poor health conditions. He had to receive treatments for two weeks at the hospital. He became the KZN's millionth man to be circumcised.

He has a 10-month-old child with Palesa Molemela, where he had to appear at Randburg Magistrate's court for his maintenance case with the baby's mother. He has two older daughters who he does not have a relationship with.

== Career ==
In 2006, he moved to Johannesburg to pursue a career in acting. Before starting acting, he had a stint with the Natal Youth Choir as a singer. Then he got to tour with a South African supergroup called "Ladysmith Black Mambazo". In 1997, he acted in the SABC3 soap opera Isidingo, and then in the SABC2 soap opera Muvhango. In 2006, he joined the third season in the episode entitled "The Three Sisters (Part 1)" of the SABC1 serial Mtunzini.com with the role "Zam".

In the same year, he joined with the SABC1 drama serial Tshisa for the role of "Bheki Shabalala". The show became very popular, and he continued to play the role for three consecutive year until 2009. Then in 2012, he made a guest appearance in the first two episodes of the serial. In 2011, he joined with the M-Net soap opera The Wild and played the role as "Isaac Tladi" until 2012. After that role, he joined with the SABC1 soap opera Generations from February 2012 to December 2013 where he played the role "Phenyo Mazibuko". He was fired from the show in 2013, where he retired from television for two years. In 2007, he appeared in the third and fourth seasons of the SABC1 drama Home Affairs.

In 2008, he made his first television lead role of "Mabutho Sokhulu" in the SABC1 drama series Sokhulu & Partners. With that popularity, he continued to play the role until 2016. In the meantime, he played the role of "Mthunzi" in the SABC1 mini-serial Shreds & Dreams in 2011. After retired from Sokhulu & Partners, he joined with the e.tv soap opera Rhythm City and played the role of "Thabiso". In 2019, he appeared in the Imbewu: The Seed with the role "Manqoba Dlamini".

Apart from acting, he joined with the social and well-being movement called "Brothers for Life" to partner on a campaign that raise awareness on men's health. In 2017, he founded the theatre production and events management company called "Langa Libalele Enterprises".

== Filmography ==
Year	Film	Role	Genre	Ref.
1997	Muvhango	Pat	TV series	
2005	City Ses'la	TT	TV series	
2005	Home Affairs	Ntsepe	TV series	
2005	Soul Buddyz	Policeman	TV series	
2006	Tshisa	Bheki Shabalala	TV series	
2006	Mtunzini.com	Zam	TV series	
2007	Rhythm City	Thabiso	TV series	
2009	Invictus	Presidential Guard	Film	
2010	4Play: Sex Tips for Girls	Tshepiso	TV series	
2010	Shreds and Dreams	Mthunzi	TV series	
2011	Sokhulu and Partners II	Mabutho Sokhulu	TV series	
2011	The Wild	Isaac Tladi	TV series	
2012	Generations	Phenyo Mazibuko	TV series	
2013	Zaziwa	Himself	TV series	
2014	Ses'Top La	Himself	TV series	
2016	The Kingdom: uKhakhayi	Sabelo	TV series	
2018	Imbewu	Manqoba Dlamini	TV series	
2022	Isifiso	Siboniso	TV series	
2023 - current	Sbongile & the Dlaminis	Sokhabase	TV series	
2023 - current	Smoke & Mirrors	Detective Phakathi	TV Series	
2025 - current	Amalanga Awafani	Reginald Gumede	TV Series	
