= Botman =

Botman is a surname. Notable people with the surname include:

- Janno Botman (born 2000), Dutch speed skater
- Selma Botman (born 1950), American academic
- Sven Botman (born 2000), Dutch footballer
- Thembile Botman (born 1976), South African actor and businessman

== See also ==
- Bowman (surname)
