= Lemogang =

Lemogang is a masculine name of Botswanan origin. Notable people with the name include:

- Lemogang Kwape, Botswanan politician
- Lemogang Tsipa, South African actor
