= Bokang =

Bokang is a given name. Notable people with the name include:

- Bokang Montjane (born 1986), South African model and beauty pageant titleholder
- Bokang Mosena (born 1991), South African cricketer
- Bokang Mothoana (born 1987), Mosotho footballer
- Bokang Phelane, Lesotho-born South African actress
