= Lindiwe Ndlovu =

South African actress (1977-2021)

- Born: Lindiwe Thembekani Ndlovu; 8 January 1977; Soweto, South Africa
- Died: 11 January 2021 (aged 44); Soweto, South Africa
- Education: Wingen Heights Secondary school
- Alma mater: Market Theatre
- Occupation: Actress
- Years active: 2004–2021
- Height: 167 cm (5 ft 6 in)
- Spouse: Rok Ajulu (1996)
- Father: Stanford Ngidi

Lindiwe Thembekani "Thembeka" Ndlovu (8 January 1977 – 11 January 2021) was a South African actress. She is best known for the roles in the films Little One (2013), Safari (2013) and Winnie Mandela (2011).

== Personal life ==
Ndlovu was born on 8 January 1977, in Dube, Soweto, South Africa, as the elder daughter of the family. She was raised in the eThekwini town of Hammarsdale. Her father Stanford Ngidi was a popular community playwright, who died in 2015. She matriculated at Wingen Heights Secondary school in Shallcross, Durban in 1995. Then in 1997, she joined the Market Theatre Laboratory for a two-year training stint.

She died on 11 January 2021, at the age of 44. According to her longtime agent, Lynne Higgins of Gaenor Artiste Management, Ndlovu died in her sleep on the morning due to COVID-19.

== Career ==
Before entering cinema and television, she joined the Market Theatre and performed in many theatre plays.

Ndlovu started her acting career in 2011 when she played the role of "Qondi" in the Mzansi television serial Mazinyo Dot Q. In the same year, she made the film debut with biographical drama feature Winnie Mandela. After this success, she played the role of Malawian maid "Buseje" on SABC1 serial Ses'Top La. In 2013, she played the lead role in the film Little One directed by Darrell Roodt. She later won the SAFTA Golden Globe Award for the Best Actress in a feature film category at the 8th annual South African Film and Television Awards (SAFTA) for the role of "Pauline" in the film. After that critically acclaimed role, she acted in the film Safari again directed by Roodt.

Since then, she made several notable appearances in the serials such as; Stokvel, Soul City, Scandal!, Isidingo and Home Affairs. In 2013 she played the role of "Sponono" in the show, Zabalaza. Then in 2017, she played the role of "Sharon" on Mzansi Magic serial Lockdown. In September 2020, she joined the cast of Mzansi Magic isiZulu serial Ifalakhe. Before the death, she announced that she was going to join the cast of the DStv telenovela, Isono.

== Filmography ==
Year	Film	Role	Genre	Ref.
2004	Mazinyo Dot Q	Qondi	TV series	
2006	Catch a Fire	assistant dialogue coach	Film	
2008	Home Affairs		TV series	
2009	Erfsondes	Receptionist	TV series	
2010	Stokvel		TV series	
2011	Winnie Mandela	Hysterical Woman 1976 Riots	Film	
2012	Room 9	Prenatal Doctor	TV series	
2012	Ses'Top La	Buseje	TV series	
2013	Little One	Pauline	Film	
2013	Safari	Mbali's aunt	Film	
2013	Zabalaza	Sponono	TV series	
2014	Generations	Nelisiwe	TV series	
2015	Soul City		TV series	
2015	Uzalo	Patjuju	TV series	
2016	Scandal!		TV series	
2016	Isidingo		TV series	
2016	Greed and Desire	Jabu	TV series	
2016	Umlilo	Nurse Nonzi	TV series	
2017	Lockdown	Sharon	TV series	
2017	Thola	Seloane	TV series	
2018	Liberty	Mama Nasira	Film	
2019	EHostela	MaKhumalo	TV series	
2019	Agent	Olipha	TV series	
2020	Ifalakhe	Anatsa	TV series	
2020	Gomora	Sis Gcina	TV series	
2020	Isono	Francina	TV series	
