= Ofentse Mwase =

South African director

- Born: June 20, 1987 (age 39); Rustenburg, North West, South Africa
- Other name: UncleScrooch
- Education: AFDA
- Occupations: director; cinematographer
- Years active: 2012-present
- Spouse: Nelisiwe Mwase

Ofentse Mwase is a South African director, filmmaker and the founder of Ofentse Mwase Films. Born and raised in Rustenburg, North West, Mwase studied film and cinematography at AFDA, The School for the Creative Economy.

== Career ==
Ofentse Mwase was born in Rustenburg, North West, South Africa. His filmmaking interest began in 2005. In 2009, he shot a Short film iGolide, and received a nomination for Best Cinematographer of 2010.

Two years later, in 2011 he shot The Hajji short film, which was nominated for Best Cinematography at AFDA. Mwase won Best Cinematography for a TV Drama Tjovitjo at the SAFTA’s annual ceremony in 2018. Same year he also shot Thato, a Sterkinekor, which won Silver Loerie at the 2011 Loerie Awards.

In 2017, Ofentse directed a Music Video for Ameni by Miss Pru featuring Sjava, A-Reece, Emtee, Fifi Cooper, Saudi and B3nchmarq which went on to win his 1st SAMA (South African Music Awards) for Music Video Of the Year 2017. He shot his first feature film Collision directed by Fabien Martorell, which will premier on June 16, 2022 on Netflix.

== Filmography ==
Year	Title	Role	Notes
2012	The Hajiji		
2017	The Hangman		
2018	Independent State of Nandi	cinematographer	
2019	Kusasa		
2022	Collision	cinematographer	

== Awards ==
Year	Nominee / work	Award	Result	Ref.
2017	OM Films	Music Video of the Year	Won	
2018	OM Films	Best Cinematography	Won	
2020	OM Films	Best Produced Music Video	Won	
2021	Ofentse Mwase	Best Video Director	Nominated	
2021	"Mali Eningi"	Best Video	Won	
2021	"Hosh"	Best Produced Music Video	Won	
