= Ayanda Daweti =

South African actor and musician

- Born: Ayanda Daweti; 1 January 1990 (age 36); Tsolo, South Africa
- Other name: Tuckshop Bafanaz
- Education: Tshwane University of Technology
- Occupations: Actor, musician
- Years active: 2009–present
- Mother: Nomalizo Daweti

Ayanda Daweti (born 1990), also known by his stage name Tuckshop Bafanaz, is a South African actor and musician. He is best known for his role 'Chumani Langa' in the popular television serial Scandal!.

== Personal life ==
He was born in 1990 and raised in Tsolo, South Africa. His mother Nomalizo Daweti died of heart complications in her sleep when Ayanda was 13 years old. After the death of his mother, he moved to Mhlakulo, Tsolo in the Eastern Cape with his aunt Stella Sondaba, and grandmother Nomonde Sondaba. After few years, he moved to Johannesburg. After completing his matric, he moved to Cape Town and studied IT as well as studied Arts at Tshwane University of Technology, Pretoria.

== Career ==
His most notable and popular television role came through the eTv soap opera Scandal!, where he played the role 'Chumani Langa'. In the serial, he played the role which is actually much younger than his real age. In 2018 he won the Golden Horn award for the Best Made for TV Movie at the South African Film and Television Award for his film Okae Molao. In 2020, he was invited to play a supportive role in the television series Blood Psalms.

Apart from acting, he is also a musician used the stage name 'Tuckshop Bafanaz'. He started music in respect of his aunt, where he released a six track debut EP. In 2019, he released an album dedicated to his mother. He dated for a girl named Xola from 2007 until her death by a tragic car accident in 2010. Later, he dedicated the song 'Xola' for her remembrance.

== Filmography ==
Year	Film	Role	Genre	Ref.
2009	Scandal!	Chumani Langa	TV series	
2022- 2023	Gomora	Sizwe	TV series	
2022	Blood Psalms	Pee-Erot	TV series	
