= Nkuli Sibeko =

South African actress and writer

- Born: Nonkuleleko Sibeko; 24 June 1980 (age 46); South Africa
- Education: University of Cape Town
- Occupations: Actress, Screenwriter, Producer
- Years active: 2005–present

Nonkuleleko 'Nkuli' Sibeko (born 24 June 1980) is a South African actress, producer and screenwriter.

== Personal life ==
Sibeko was born on 24 June 1980 in South Africa. She graduated with a degree in Theatre and Performance at the University of Cape Town.

She is married to fellow actor Thembile Botman.

== Career ==
In 2005, she joined with the SABC1 sitcom City Ses'la and played the role as "Dana Roberts". The role became very popular, where she continued to play the role until the end of fourth season in 2010. In 2009, she won the Best Supporting Actress Award in TV Comedy category at the South African Film and Television Awards (SAFTA) for this role. Before that won, she was nominated for Best Actress - TV Comedy category at SAFTAs in both 2006 and 2007. In the meantime, she appeared in the second season of the SABC1 drama series Society with a minor role as "Dineo's Nanny". Then she starred as "Zanele" in the Mzansi Magic sitcom It's for Life.

In 2012, she made a supportive role of "Dana" in the SABC1 comedy series Ses'Top La, where she reprised her role in the second season as well. In 2014, she made a guest role in the Mzansi Magic serial Samsokolo. In 2014 she co-wrote the script for the SABC1 reality competition series The Perfect Sishebo Show. She was nominated twice for Best Achievement in Scriptwriting in TV Comedy category for the serials Kota Life Crisis and Puppet Nation ZA at the 2016 SAFTAs. For the script of Puppet Nation ZA, Sibeko was again nominated Best Achievement in Scriptwriting at the 2017 SAFTAs.

She is the executive producer at Jack&Jill Productions where she produced the 2013 short film Lexus and 2018 film Table Manners.

== Filmography ==
Year	Film	Role	Genre	Ref.
2005	City Ses'la	Dana Roberts	TV series	
2005	Mazinyo dot Q.	Mrs Dlovo	TV series	
2006	Izoso Connexion	Lerato	TV series	
2009	Society	Dineo's Nanny	TV series	
2010	Home Affairs	Mpho	TV series	
2011	It's for Life	Zanele	TV series	
2012	Ses'Top La	Dana	TV series	
2013	Samsokolo	Guest role	TV series	
2013	Lexus	Producer	Short film	
2018	Table Manners	Producer, writer	Film	
