= Judy Ditchfield =

South African actress and singer

- Born: Judith Angela Broderick; 23 July 1963 (age 63); Pretoria, South Africa
- Education: University of Natal
- Occupations: Actress, singer, writer, producer
- Years active: 1989–present
- Height: 1. 63 m

Judith Angela Broderick (born 22 July 1963), popularly known as Judy Ditchfield, is a South African actress and singer. Judy Ditchfield is probably best known for her role as Stella Fouche in the South African award-winning daily soap Isidingo, and Mrs Rabinowitz in Ses Top’la but her career began more than 40 years before that, as a founder member of the Loft Theatre Company in Durban. After moving to Johannesburg, Judy worked in predominantly theatre, film, and television.

Highlights in her career have been Paul Slabolepszy’s Boo to the Moon and Heel against the Head for which she received a FNB Vita award for Comedy. Fiela’s Child: The Musical (Vita Award Nomination); The Buddy Holly Story, Rainshark at the Market Theatre, and Macbeth for Pact. She played Vi Moore in Footloose for which she received a Naledi nomination. She was seen on stage in The Boys in the Photograph and the award- winning production of Sister Act as Sister Mary Martin-of-Tours at the Johannesburg Theatre and Menopause: The Musical at the Pieter Toerien Theatre at Montecasino. Favourite play to date is 6 Dance Lessons in 6 Weeks alongside Jose Domingos, directed by Greg Homan at the Auto and General Theatre on the square and the Hilton Arts Festival; And Tiger Bay the Wales Millennial Centre, Cardiff and Artscape co-production, as Leonora Piper, opposite John Owen-Jones, and as the Bosun. Most recently she was seen as Maud in the immersive production of Macabre for UJ Arts and Culture and as Evelyn Sharpe in A Marry Little Christmas at The Market Theatre.

Television includes SABC 1 TV Comedy, Ses Top ‘La and SABC 3 Drama, Isidingo as Stella. Judy has been exposed to many theatre productions, films and television, voice work and dubbing. Highlights have included her corporate work with blue-chip companies as a facilitator and Business Role Player.

AWARDS • FNB/TONIGHT VITA COMEDY AWARD for HEEL AGAINST THE HEAD, 1994/1995 • Nomination, REGIONAL VITA AWARDS, KWAZULU NATAL, best supporting actress for HEEL AGAINST THE HEAD, for her role as Celeste, 1995/1996 • Nomination, REGIONAL VITA AWARDS, CAPE Best Supporting Actress for FIELA’S CHILD: THE MUSICAL, for her role as Barta, 1998/1999 • Nomination, REGIONAL VITA AWARDS, KWAZULU NATAL, Best Performance in A Comedy, Female, in COMRADES ARMS, 2000/2001 • Nomination, 2006 NALEDI THEATRE AWARDS, Best Comedy Performance(Female) in a Play, Musical or Revue for MENOPAUSE: THE MUSICAL • Nomination FNB 2009 NALEDI THEATRE AWARDS, best supporting actress for Footloose: The Musical, Vi Moore. She is also a successful businessman as well as UK trained as a BRP and facilitator.

== Personal life ==
She was born on 22 July 1963 in Pretoria, South Africa and later grew up in Irene. At the age of six, she moved to Kimberley with her parents. Then at the age of 13, her family again moved to Pietermaritzburg. From 1984 to 1987, she spent in Durban and then moved to Johannesburg. She attended several schools: Belgravia Junior School and Herlear Primary in Kimberley for primary education. Then she attended to Pelham Primary school for Standard 5. Then she completed matric exams in Pietermaritzburg Girls High School, Pietermaritzburg.

Then she obtained her BA Degree in Psychology and Drama at the University of Natal, Pietermaritzburg. From 1984 to 1987 after graduation, she worked at the Natal Performing Arts Council (NAPAC).

She is married to actor and musician Paul Ditchfield. The couple has two sons: Keaton and Tom. Keaton was born in 1991 and is also an actor. Tom was born in 1996 and studies B.Com. Law at University of Wits.

== Career ==
She started acting career in theatre with Loft Theatre Company, a branch of NAPAC. During this period, he performed in the plays Boo To The Moon produced by Paul Slabolepszy, Tales From The Pleasure Palace by Janice Honeyman, Kwamanzi, Every Good Boy Deserves Favour, Hambe Kahle, Maid In South Africa, Mistakes Of An African Night To Conquer, En Dit Was More, In The War and Kitchen Tea. Then she performed in the play Macbeth at the State Theatre in Pretoria as well as in the plays The Things We Do For Love and Comrades Arms produced by Anthony Ackerman. In 2001, she earned a Kwazulu-Natal Vita nomination for Best Female Performance In A Comedy Role.

Apart from acting, she is also a prolific singer and made several popular hits and musical appearances: Christian; Neill Solomon Rock Concert; Bursting Out; Soundcraft; The Last Great Drive-In Movie Picture Show; It's All Fright By Me; It's Still Rock And Roll To Me; Tarts; A Touch Of Tonic; the smash hit Richard Loring production A Touch Of Webber, A Taste Of Rice; Snow White And The Seven Dwarves; Buddy: The Buddy Holly Story; Fiela's Child: The Musical; The Night They Invented Champagne; and Queen: The Concert at the Sandton Convention Centre.

From October 2006 to March 2007, she starred in Menopause: The Musical for Showtime Management which was staged at the Montecasino Theatre in Johannesburg. During this period, she received a 2006 Naledi Theatre Award nomination for Best Comedy Performance (Female) for this play. Meanwhile, she appeared in several television shows including The Game II, Sonnekring II, Suburban Bliss and Streaks I and II. She also played lead roles in the serials; Angels, Hoof Of Africa, Zero Tolerance and Yizo Yizo. In 2012, she appeared in the television sitcom Ses'Top La and played the role of 'Mrs. Rabinowitz'.

In 2019, she played the role 'Stella Fouche' in the popular soapie Isidingo. She also made appearances in the films, Faith's Corner, Glory Glory, Cape Of Good Hope and Stander.

== Filmography ==
Year	Film	Role	Genre	Ref.
1989	Bonne espérance		TV series	
1997	u'Bejani	Animal voices	Film	
2002	Hooded Angels	Old Whore	Film	
2003	Stander	Mrs. Jennings	Film	
2004	Cape of Good Hope	Snake Lady	Film	
2005	Faith's Corner	Motorist	Film	
2006	Running Riot	Beatrice Koekemoer	Film	
2014	Ses' Top La	Mrs. Rabinowitz	TV series	
2019	Isidingo	Stella Fouche	TV series	
