= Alien Outpost =

- Film poster
- Directed by: Jabbar Raisani
- Screenplay by: Blake Clifton; Jabbar Raisani
- Story by: Jabbar Raisani
- Produced by: Will Clarke; Laurie Cook; Trevor Engelson; Ed Fraiman; Julia Godzinskaya; Andy Mayson; Josh McGuire; Adam Nagel; Jason Newmark; Jabbar Raisani; Mike Runagall; Michael Sackler; Evan Silverberg; Sophie Vickers
- Starring: Adrian Paul; Reiley McClendon; Rick Ravanello
- Cinematography: Blake Clifton
- Music by: Theo Green
- Production companies: Altitude Film Entertainment; Bigscope Films; Out of Africa Entertainment; Ravens Nest Entertainment; Rooks Nest Entertainment
- Distributed by: IFC Films; IFC Midnight; Viva Films; IPA Asia Pacific
- Release date: 19 September 2014 (Vietnam)
- Running time: 90 minutes
- Countries: United Kingdom; South Africa
- Language: English

Alien Outpost, formerly known as Outpost 37, is a 2014 science fiction film directed by Jabbar Raisani and starring Adrian Paul. Reiley McClendon, and Rick Ravanello. The film follows a documentary crew sent to record the daily lives of the soldiers of Outpost 37, 12 years after the initial alien invasion. Its format parodies the real documentaries Restrepo and Korengal.

== Plot ==
In 2021, aliens called "Heavies" invade Earth and make quick gains against a disorganised response from various nations. When the United Nations disbands and a united military front, the USDF (United Space Defense Force), replaces it, the aliens are driven off Earth, though thousands of their troops are left behind. Defensive satellites are thought to protect Earth from a second invasion. In 2033, two embedded journalists accompany reinforcements to a demilitarised zone between Pakistan and Afghanistan, where Outpost 37, one of the last USDF outposts in the region, is located. After a hazing period, the reinforcements settle into life at the outpost.

Local villagers assault the outpost, and a soldier explains they had no problems until recently when he believes that the continued violation of their sovereignty has soured relations. Although the soldiers are victorious over the villagers, one soldier is wounded and sent off to recuperate. Their requests for supplies are denied, but they receive a replacement for the injured soldier in the form of Hans, a German national who volunteers to serve with the primarily American group. Later, Saleem, a loyal local to Outpost 37 after they rescued him, reports that villagers complain of animal mutilations. The captain sends several soldiers back with Saleem to determine the cause.

An angry villager says mortar fire killed his animals, but the soldiers deny this. As Saleem translates for them, a seemingly dazed villager approaches despite the warnings. He explodes when the herder speaks to him. A Heavy opens fire from a hill above them, and the soldiers fall back. Saleem notices that North, one of the soldiers, is missing, and they mount an unsuccessful search. Video evidence from North's recovered helmet reveals that the Heavies abducted him. Concerned that the Heavies have changed their tactics to include ambushes and abductions, the captain leaves the base to discuss the situation with his superiors. He orders them not to leave under any circumstances.

Later, a private military contractor approaches the base and claims jurisdiction, and the soldiers back down when their orders confirm this. Unable to mount their own rescue mission, they deploy a drone and, during routine reconnaissance, discover that Saleem is in danger. They disobey their orders to save him and take a Heavy prisoner in the process. The captain is furious when he returns; he executes the Heavy and demands they cease their attempts to save North, an action that violates orders. Saleem volunteers to help. When he visits the base, Saleem seems dazed and uncommunicative. He opens fire on the soldiers and kills one before the captain kills him. In interviews, the soldiers express shock that Saleem would betray them. Omohundro, the medic, discovers an incision at the back of Saleem's head.

To find answers, the soldiers leave for Saleem's village. There, they discover North, near-unconscious and wounded. They take him back to the base, where he falls into a coma. One of the soldiers recognises his rhythmic blinking as a code, and they translate it as a series of coordinates. When they attempt to question North, he wakes and chokes the captain, hysterically demanding that the captain kill him; he does. Omohundro discovers an incision at the back of his head and recovers an implant, which he suspects may have been a mind-control device. During the next attack by insurrectionists, Omohundro examines their heads, also finding incisions. Overwhelmed, the soldiers abandon Outpost 37 and blow it up.

In violation of orders, the soldiers investigate the coordinates. There, they find an alien structure. Several soldiers fall back into the structure under fire from mind-controlled locals and Heavies, where they discover the contractors and several missing villagers. Although several soldiers and one of the journalists are killed, they destroy the structure and free the villagers from the mind-control effects. The remaining journalist reveals that the structure was designed to defeat the USDF satellite system and allow resupply of the Heavies. The soldiers are given commendations for foiling this plan, but the journalist expresses doubt that the apathetic public will ever understand their sacrifices.

A short scene after the credits shows many of the survivors of Outpost 37 with advanced prosthetics as they engage in an all-out fight against a second invasion.

== Cast ==
- Adrian Paul as General Dane
- Reiley McClendon as Ryan Andros
- Rick Ravanello as Spears
- Douglas Tait as The Heavy
- Joe Reegan as Alex Omohundro
- Andy Davoli as Savino (voice)
- Nic Rasenti as Harty
- Matthew Holmes as North
- Sven Ruygrok as Frankie Forello
- Brandon Auret as Savino
- Scott E. Miller as John Wilks
- Jordan Shade as the PMC Soldier
- Kenneth Fok as Zilla
- Darron Meyer as Roger Hollis
- Stevel Marc as Righty
- Justin Munitz as Hans
- Michael Dube as Brick
- Lemogang Tsipa as Mac
- Khalil Kathrada as Saleem
- Tyrel Meyer as Duke
- Tapiwa Musvosvi as Tyrone "Bones" Ridell
- Edwin Jay as Soldier
- Craig Macrae as Lefty
- Sherwyn Budraj as Soldier

== Release ==
IFC Midnight released the film theatrically and on video on demand in the United States on 30 January 2014.

== Critical reception ==
According to review aggregator Metacritic, the film has a score of 26 out of 100, which it terms "generally unfavorable reviews". Frank Scheck of The Hollywood Reporter called the plot "an excuse for the video game-style military mayhem which springs up periodically". Jeannette Catsoulis of The New York Times praised the acting but said that it can not overcome the script. Michael Rechtshaffen of the Los Angeles Times said the film would make a better video game. Ed Gonzalez of Slant Magazine rated it 1.5/4 stars and wrote, "Alien Outpost splits its time evenly between half-heartedly pretending it's an allegory for our current war on terror and pretending that it's not." Andrew Lapin of The Dissolve rated it 2/5 stars and called it "Starship Troopers without the irony".
