= Tjovitjo =

South African television drama series

- Genre: Drama
- Directed by: Vincent Moloi
- Starring: Mafred
- Country of origin: South Africa
- No. of seasons: 2

Original release
- Release: 20 August 2017 – present

Tjovitjo is a South African dance drama series. It follows the lives of Pantsula dancers and how they navigate around the everyday challenges of their township.

== Plot ==
Tjovitjo is a hyper-reality dance series set in the slums of Johannesburg. Tjovitjo is led by Mafred, played by Warren Masemola, who is a thug and dancer with a past as a petty criminal. The show follows him as he seeks the approval of his community.

The series spotlights sePantsula - a subculture and dance form that emerged in the 1950s, during Apartheid. Beneath the dirty street dance-offs, each episode of Tjovitjo delves into contemporary issues that plague South Africa and the youth, such as unsafe abortion, zama-zama (illegal mining) and physical abuse.

Dance is what keeps this impoverished community sane, However, in the second season, dance is banned putting this very sanity to the test. Amidst Mafred's poverty and struggle, a hardened Pantsula dance leader enters thug life and searches for redemption and salvation in his community.

== Accolades ==
=== South African Film And Television (2019) ===
- SAFTA Golden Horn (Winner)

Best Achievement in Directing - TV Drama Vincent Moloi

- SAFTA Golden Horn (Nominee)

Best TV Drama

- SAFTA Golden Horn (Nominee)

Best actor - TV Drama Warren Masemola

- SAFTA Golden Horn (Nominee)

Best Achievement in Editing - TV Drama

- SAFTA Golden Horn (Nominee)

Best Achievement In Art/ Design Production - TV Drama Vivienne Mahloko

- SAFTA Golden Horn (Nominee)

Best Achievement in Cinematography- TV Drama Motheo Moeng

=== South African Film And Television Awards, SAFTA (2018) ===
- SAFTA Golden Horn (Winner)

Best actor - TV Drama Warren Masemola

- SAFTA Golden Horn (Winner)

Best TV Drama - Puo Pha Productions

- SAFTA Golden Horn (Winner)

Best Achievement in Editing - TV Drama Ikaye Masisi

- SAFTA Golden Horn (Winner)

Best Achievement In Art/ Design Production - Ephraim Mathula, Vivenne Mahloko

- SAFTA Golden Horn (Winner)

Best Achievement in Sound Design -TV Drama

- SAFTA Golden Horn (Winner)

Best Achievement in Cinematography - TV Drama Motheo Moeng, Marius Van Graan, Ofentse Mwase

- SAFTA Golden Horn (Nominee)

Best Achievement in Costume Design - TV Drama Charity Shirley Masonto
