= Amandla (film) =

- Poster
- Directed by: Nerina De Jager
- Written by: Nerina De Jager
- Produced by: Greig Buckle; Jarrod de Jong; Riaan Van Der Wart
- Starring: Lemogang Tsipa; Thabo Rametsi; Israel Matseke-Zulu
- Cinematography: Justus de Jager
- Edited by: Ronelle Loots; Danielle Nel
- Music by: Mauritz Lotz
- Production companies: Firegrass Films; M4gic-J Entertainment
- Distributed by: Netflix
- Release date: 21 January 2022
- Running time: 106 minutes
- Countries: South Africa; Canada
- Languages: English; Afrikaans; Zulu

Amandla is a 2022 film directed and written by Nerina De Jager and starring Lemogang Tsipa, Thabo Rametsi and Israel Matseke-Zulu. The film was released on January 21, 2022, on Netflix.

== Cast ==
- Lemogang Tsipa as Impi
- Thabo Rametsi as Nkosana
- Israel Matseke-Zulu as Shaka (as Israel Makoe)
- Charlie Bouguenon as Drill Sergeant
- Jaco Muller as Klein
- Jacques Pepler as Rookie 1
- Liza Van Deventer as Elizabeth
- Marnitz van Deventer as Pieter
- Lucky Koza as Officer Lekgalagadi
- Rowlen Ethelbert von Gericke as Simon
- Paballo Koza as Phakiso
