= Circumcision and HIV =

Male circumcision reduces the risk of human immunodeficiency virus (HIV) transmission from HIV positive women to men in high risk populations. In 2020, the World Health Organization (WHO) reiterated that male circumcision is an efficacious intervention for HIV prevention in high-risk countries if carried out by medical professionals under safe conditions. Circumcision reduces the risk that a man will acquire HIV and other sexually transmitted infections (STIs) from an infected female partner through vaginal sex. Circumcision has been shown to help reduce transmission of HIV to men who have sex with men (MSM) who are primarily-insertive. The effectiveness of using circumcision to prevent HIV in the developed world is not determined.

== Efficacy ==
=== Heterosexual men ===
As of 2020, past research has shown that circumcision reduces the risk of HIV infection in heterosexual men, although these studies have had limitations.

The WHO Expert Group on Models To Inform Fast Tracking Voluntary Medical Male Circumcision In HIV Combination Prevention in 2016 found "large benefits" of circumcision in settings with high HIV prevalence and low circumcision prevalence. The Group estimated male circumcision is cost-saving in almost all high priority countries. Furthermore, WHO stated that: "While circumcision reduces a man's individual lifetime HIV risk, the indirect effect of preventing further HIV transmissions to women, their babies (vertical transmission) and from women to other men has an even greater impact on the population incidence, particularly for circumcisions performed at younger ages (under age 25 years)."

Newly circumcised HIV infected men who are not taking antiretroviral therapy can shed the HIV virus from the circumcision wound, thus increasing the immediate risk of HIV transmission to female partners. This risk of post-operative transmission presents a challenge, although in the long-term it is possible the circumcision of HIV-infected men helps lessen heterosexual HIV transmission overall. Such viral shedding can be mitigated by the use of antiretroviral drugs. Additional research is needed to ascertain the existence and potential risk of viral shedding from circumcision wounds.

=== Men who have sex with men ===
Circumcision helps protect primarily-insertive men who have anal sex sex with men from HIV, particularly for those that are unable or unwilling to take PrEP.

The WHO does not currently recommend circumcision to help protect against male to male HIV transmission because of inconsistent evidence for its efficacy.

=== Regional differences ===
Whether circumcision is beneficial to developed countries for HIV prevention purposes is undetermined. It is not known whether the effect of male circumcision differs by HIV-1 variant. The predominant subtype of HIV-1 in the United States is subtype B, and in Africa, the predominant subtypes are A, C, and D.

== Recommendations ==
In 2020, the WHO declared voluntary medical male circumcision (VMMC) a priority intervention in 12 countries in eastern and southern Africa in their 2007 recommendations, later increased to 15 countries with the addition of South Sudan, Uganda, and Ethiopia.

Although these results confirm that male circumcision reduces the risk of men becoming infected with HIV, the UN agencies emphasize that it does not provide complete protection against HIV infection. Circumcised men can still become infected with the virus and, if HIV-positive, can infect their sexual partners. Male circumcision should never replace other known effective prevention methods and should always be considered as part of a comprehensive prevention package, which includes correct and consistent use of male or female condoms, reduction in the number of sexual partners, delaying the onset of sexual relations, and HIV testing, counseling, and treatment.

— World Health Organization, Joint WHO/UNAIDS Statement, 2007.

In 2025, The Joint United Nations Programme on HIV/AIDS (UNAIDS) updated estimates of the impact of male circumcision on HIV incidence rates. Specifically, they estimate that VMMC programmes continue to be cost-effective in all 15 high priority countries. In a modeling study of 13 of the high priority countries, the 37.5 million circumcisions performed as of 2023 prevented 890,000 new HIV infections, and 1 new HIV infection was prevented for every 42 circumcisions performed. The recommendation did not extend to men who have sex with men.

In the United States, the American Academy of Pediatrics (AAP) led a 2012 task force which included the American Academy of Family Physicians (AAFP), the American College of Obstetricians and Gynecologists (ACOG), and the Centers for Disease Control (CDC). The task force concluded that circumcision may be helpful for the prevention of HIV in the United States. The CDC 2018 position on circumcision and HIV recommended that circumcision should continue to be offered to parents who are informed of the benefits and risks, including a potential reduction in risk of HIV transmission. The position asserts that circumcision conducted after sexual debut can result in missed opportunities for HIV prevention.

Because the evidence that circumcision prevents HIV mainly comes from studies conducted in Africa, the Royal Dutch Medical Association (KNMG) questioned the applicability of those studies to developed countries. Circumcision has not been included in their HIV prevention recommendations. The KNMG circumcision policy statement was endorsed by several Dutch medical associations. The policy statement was initially released in 2010, but was reviewed again and accepted in 2022.

== Mechanism of action ==
While the biological mechanism of action is not known, a 2020 meta-analysis stated "the consistent protective effect suggests that the reasons for the heterogeneity lie in concomitant individual social and medical factors, such as presence of STIs, rather than a different biological impact of circumcision."

The inner foreskin harbours an increased density of CD4 T-cells and releases increased levels of pro-inflammatory cytokines. Hence the sub-preputial space displays a pro-inflammatory environment, conducive to HIV infection.

Langerhans cells (part of the human immune system) under the foreskin may be a source of entry for HIV. Excising the foreskin removes what is thought to be a main entry point for the HIV virus.

== History ==
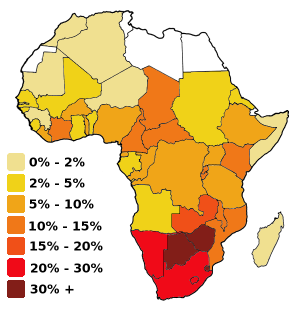
Map showing prevalence of HIV/AIDS in Africa based on 1999–2001 figures

Valiere Alcena, in a 1986 letter to the New York State Journal of Medicine, noted that low rates of circumcision in parts of Africa had been linked to the high rate of HIV infection. Aaron J. Fink several months later also proposed that circumcision could have a preventive role when the New England Journal of Medicine published his letter, "A possible explanation for heterosexual male infection with AIDS," in October, 1986. By 2000, over 40 epidemiological studies had been conducted to investigate the relationship between circumcision and HIV infection. A meta-analysis conducted by researchers at the London School of Hygiene & Tropical Medicine examined 27 studies of circumcision and HIV in sub-Saharan Africa and concluded that these showed circumcision to be "associated with a significantly reduced risk of HIV infection" that could form part of a useful public health strategy. A 2005 review of 37 observational studies expressed reservations about the conclusion because of possible confounding factors, since all studies to date had been observational as opposed to randomized controlled trials. The authors stated that three randomized controlled trials then underway in Africa would provide "essential evidence" about the effects of circumcision on preventing HIV.

Experimental evidence was needed to establish a causal relationship, so three randomized controlled trials (RCT) were commissioned as a means to reduce the effect of any confounding factors. Trials took place in South Africa, Kenya and Uganda. All three trials were stopped early by their monitoring boards because those in the circumcised group had a substantially lower rate of HIV incidence than the control group, and hence it was seen as unethical to withhold the procedure, in light of strong evidence of efficacy. In 2009, a Cochrane review which included the results of the three randomized controlled trials found "strong" evidence that the acquisition of HIV by a man during sex with a woman was decreased by 54% (95% confidence interval, 38% to 66%) over 24 months if the man was circumcised. The review also found a low incidence of adverse effects from circumcision in the trials reviewed. WHO assessed the trials as "gold standard" studies and found "strong and consistent" evidence from later studies that confirmed the results. In 2020, a review including post-study follow up from the three randomized controlled trials, as well as newer observational studies, found a 59% relative reduction in HIV incidence, and 1.31% absolute decrease across the three randomized controlled trials, as well as continued protection for up to 6 years after the studies began.

== Society and culture ==
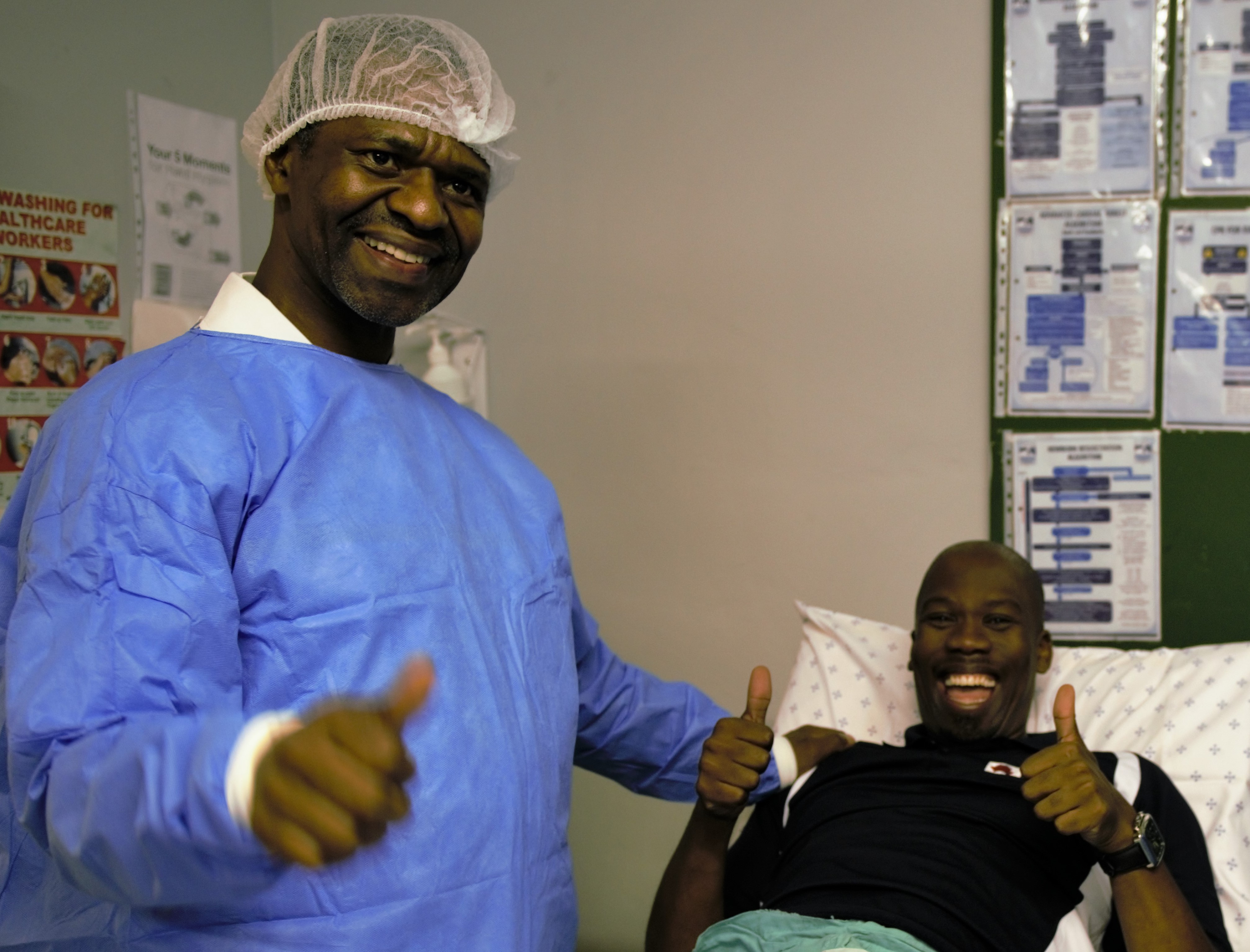
Actor Melusi Yeni received the 1 millionth VMMC against HIV/AIDS transmission in the province of KwaZulu-Natal, South Africa in 2018.

The WHO recommends VMMC, as opposed to traditional circumcision. There is some evidence that traditionally circumcised men (i.e. who have been circumcised by a person who is not medically trained) use condoms less often and have higher numbers of sexual partners, increasing their risk of contracting HIV. Newly circumcised men must refrain from sexual activity until the wounds are fully healed.

The prevalence of circumcision varies across Africa. Studies were conducted to assess the acceptability of promoting circumcision; in 2007, country consultations and planning to scale up male circumcision programmes took place in Botswana, Eswatini, Kenya, Lesotho, Malawi, Mozambique, Namibia, Rwanda, South Africa, Uganda, Tanzania, Zambia and Zimbabwe.

=== Advocacy campaigns ===
In their analysis of "Stand Proud, Get Circumcised", a public health campaign promoting circumcision as an HIV-prevention strategy in Uganda, Sociologist Sarah Rudrum and colleagues criticize the campaign's materials because they "exploit male anxieties about appearance and performance, drawing on hegemonic masculinity to promote circumcision as an idealized body aesthetic." The authors state that the campaign also lacks an overall HIV prevention message.

=== Criticism of VMMC programmes ===
The scientific consensus positions of major medical organizations, including that of the World Health Organization, is that circumcision is one of the most effective methods of preventing HIV transmission in high-risk locations. Despite this, there is criticism of the programmes from political, scientific, ethical, legal and cultural lenses.

==== From politicians ====
In the 2025 speech to a joint session of Congress, President Trump cited a circumcision grant to Mozambique as what he considered an example of government waste. It also marked the first time circumcision has ever been mentioned in a State of the Union or speech to a joint session of Congress.

==== From academics ====
Dr Mark Lamont has spoken about having a complex view of the VMMC programme in Kenya. He talks about strengths, failures, controversy, and complications. Stating: “There is an enormous amount of medical/scientific research published on the topic, but not many are looking at it from a sociocultural, and even fewer from a historical, perspective...”

== See also ==
- Reproductive health
- Female Circumcision
- Prevalence of circumcision
- Circumcision controversies
