= Lemogang Tsipa =

South African actor (born 1991)

- Born: Lemogang Peter Phetolo Tsipa; 6 May 1991 (age 35); Empangeni, KwaZulu-Natal, South Africa
- Education: AFDA
- Occupation: Actor
- Years active: 2014–present
- Notable work: Shaka iLembe; Blood Psalms; Alien Outpost

Lemogang Peter Phetolo Tsipa (born 6 May 1991) is a South African actor and former musician. He is best known for his portrayal of Shaka Zulu in the Mzansi Magic historical epic Shaka iLembe (2023–2025) as Shaka Zulu and telenovela Isithembiso (2017–2019) as Bambatha.

He has appeared in international and local productions including Alien Outpost, Eye in the Sky, Blood Psalms and the crime thriller Killer Front Page.

== Early life ==
Tsipa was born on 6 May 1991 in Empangeni, KwaZulu-Natal, to Alfred and Sally Tsipa. After being diagnosed with attention deficit hyperactivity disorder at age nine, he channelled his energy into sports and performing arts. He matriculated at Grantleigh College in Richards Bay before training at the South African School of Motion Picture Medium and Live Performance (AFDA), graduating in 2012 with a focus on acting and camera operation.

== Career ==
=== 2014–2021: Career beginnings and International roles ===
Shortly after graduating, Tsipa made his film debut as a crewman in the 2014 sci-fi war film Alien Outpost. That same year he secured his first major television role as Detective Dini Masilela in E.tv's crime drama Traffic!. He also appeared in the Penguin Films miniseries Forced Love, part of SABC1's "Shakespeare in Mzansi" strand.

Between 2015 and 2017, Tsipa had small parts in the British-led drama Eye in the Sky and the film adaptation of The Dark Tower. He credits his early career as a singer-songwriter with giving him discipline and stage presence.

=== 2022–present: Breakthrough with Shaka iLembe ===
In June 2023, Tsipa took on what he describes as "the most iconic role" of his career Shaka Zulu in the Mzansi Magic epic Shaka iLembe. To inhabit the adult king, he trained intensively with a stunt coordinator to master traditional Zulu weaponry and dance, adhered to a rigorous fitness and high-protein diet, and even worked with animal handlers to gain confidence around snakes for certain scenes.

Following Shaka iLembe, he joined the cast of Showmax's fantasy drama Blood Psalms (2022), and in early 2024 starred as Sol in SABC3's crime thriller Killer Front Page, delivering what IOL called "a performance of steely resolve that is unsettling at times."

Shaka iLembe set SAFTA records in 2024, earning 17 nominations and winning 12 awards including Best Television Drama making it the most awarded series in the ceremony's history as the lead actor, Tsipa's performance was central to this success. News24 described his casting in Shaka iLembe as "life changing," noting the physical and emotional demands of the role.

== Personal life ==
Tsipa speaks Zulu, Xhosa, Tswana, English and Afrikaans, often drawing on this multilingual ability to enrich his character work. He remains private about his personal relationships but has been open about how managing ADHD informed his creative drive.

== Filmography ==
| Year | Title | Role | Medium |
|---|---|---|---|
| 2014 | Alien Outpost | Crewman | Feature film |
| 2014 | Homeland | Drone Pilot | TV series |
| 2014 | The Golden Rule | Thabo | Short film |
| 2014 | Traffic! | Detective Dini Masilela | TV drama (eKasi+/e.tv) |
| 2015 | The Book of Negroes | Canvas Town Freddy | TV miniseries |
| 2015 | Lazy Susan | Mr. Beggar | Short film |
| 2015 | Eye in the Sky | Military personnel | Feature film |
| 2015 | Jamillah and Aladdin | Rich Merchant | TV series |
| 2015 | Wallander | Victor Mabasha | TV series |
| 2016 | Cape Town | Hector Ntulu | TV miniseries |
| 2016 | Black Sails | Chidi | TV series |
| 2016 | Jab | Smiley the Zulu | TV series |
| 2016 | Roots | Addo | TV miniseries |
| 2017 | Oasis | Male Nurse | TV movie |
| 2017 | Beyond the River | Duma | TV movie |
| 2017 | The Dark Tower | Townsman | Feature film |
| 2017 | The Number | Issac | TV film |
| 2017 | Isithembiso | Bambatha | TV drama |
| 2018 | Troy: Fall of a City | Patroklus | TV series |
| 2019 | The Boy Who Harnessed the Wind | Mike Kachigunda | TV movie |
| 2019 | Back of the Moon | Ghost | TV movie |
| 2019 | The Republic | Sizwe | TV series |
| 2021 | Carrots | Tony | Short film |
| 2021 | Pusha Pressa Phanda | The Worker | TV movie |
| 2022 | Amandla | Impi | TV movie |
| 2022 | Blood Psalms | Xhosa warrior | TV series (Showmax) |
| 2023–2025 | Shaka iLembe | Shaka Zulu | TV drama (Mzansi Magic) |
| 2024 | Reyka | Tokkie | TV series |
| 2025 | The Mommy Club NBO | TBD | TV series |

== Awards and nominations ==
| Year | Award | Category | Work | Result | Ref. |
|---|---|---|---|---|---|
| 2024 | Septimius Awards | Best African Actor | Shaka iLembe | Nominated | |
