= Ses'Top La =

South African sitcom

- Genre: Sitcom
- Created by: Mandla N
- Written by: Tiffany Jones Barbuzano (Seasons 1-2); Reabetswe 'Rea' Moeti (Season 3)
- Directed by: Mandla N.
- Country of origin: South Africa
- Original languages: English; IsiZulu; IsiXhosa; Sepedi
- No. of seasons: 5

Production
- Executive producers: Tumi Masemola; Mandla N; TT Mbha; Lucy Witts; Nicci Fourie
- Running time: 22-26 minutes
- Production company: BlackBrain Pictures

Original release
- Network: SABC 1
- Release: 1 July 2012 – August 2022

Related
- City Ses'La

Ses'Top La is a South African television comedy series created and directed by Mandla N and produced by BlackBrain Pictures for SABC 1, serving as a spin-off to City Ses'La. Mandla N and Busisiwe Lurayi both reprised their roles from the previous series, starring alongside Trevor Gumbi, Jason Goliath, Brenda Ngxoli, Judy Ditchfield and Warren Masemola.

== Plot ==
Five years after the events of City Ses'La, Themba Khumalo (Mandla N), now married to Phumzile (Busi Lurayi), move from the city to Sandton. Without the safety net in the form of their friends, they need to navigate through their new extravagant lifestyle, their marriage, owning the upmarket Sandton Gold apartments, and the new zany characters they meet.

== Cast ==
- Mandla N as Themba Khumalo
- Busisiwe Lurayi as Phumzile Khumalo
  - Nelisa Mchunu as Phumzile (season 5)
- Trevor Gumbi as Gideon Gwinyimbuzi
- Warren Masemola as Thoko Chanel
- Lindiwe Ndlovu as Buseje
- Jason Goliath as Gatiep
- Leroy Gopal as Oleshe
- Judy Ditchfield as Mrs. Rabinowitz
- Dambuza Mdledle Jr as Fishbone
- Brenda Ngxoli as Pinky
- Jamela Vuma as Intelligent
- Khanyisa Bunu as Nobuhle

== Broadcast ==
The series premiered on 1 June 2012, on SABC 1. Later on, it was added to the SABC Plus streaming service.

=== International broadcast ===
The series has been added to streaming services Prime Video, Apple TV+ and Tubi.

== Accolades ==
List of awards and nominations received by Ses'Top La
Year	Award	Category	Result	Ref.
2015	South African Film and Television Awards	Best Supporting Actor (TV Comedy): Warren Masemola	Won	
2018	South African Film and Television Awards	Best Achievement in Art Production Design (TV Comedy)	Nominated	
2018	South African Film and Television Awards	Best Achievement in Directing (TV Comedy)	Nominated	
2018	South African Film and Television Awards	Best Achievement in Editing (TV Comedy)	Nominated	
2018	South African Film and Television Awards	Best Supporting Actor (TV Comedy): Trevor Gumbi	Nominated	
2018	South African Film and Television Awards	Best Supporting Actor (TV Comedy): Warren Masemola	Nominated	
2023	South African Film and Television Awards	Best Achievement in Sound (TV Comedy)	Nominated	
2023	South African Film and Television Awards	Best Supporting Actor (TV Comedy): Trevor Gumbi	Nominated	
2023	South African Film and Television Awards	Best Supporting Actor (TV Comedy): Warren Masemola	Nominated	
