= City Ses'La =

South African television sitcom series

- Created by: Luke Rous; Meren Reddy
- Starring: Luke Rous; Meren Reddy; Mandla N; Tumi Masemola; Nkuli Sibeko; Busi Lurayi; Thuli Thabethe
- Country of origin: South Africa

Production
- Executive producers: Meren Reddy, Mandla N, Luke Rous, Josh Rous, Tumi Masemola
- Running time: 22-26 minutes
- Production companies: BlackBrain Pictures; Endemol

Original release
- Network: SABC 1

City Ses'La is a South African television sitcom series went on air from 2005-2011.The sitcom series was created and executive produced by Meren Reddy, Luke Rous, and Mandla N. The series was produced by BlackBrain Pictures and Endemol for SABC 1. Reddy, Mandla N and Rous also star in the series, alongside Busi Lurayi, Thuli Thabethe, Nkuli Sibeko and Tumi Masemola. The series saw a spinoff Ses'Top Laa in 2014.

== Cast ==
=== Main ===
- Nkuli Sibeko as Dana Roberts
- Mandla N as Themba Khumalo
- Busisiwe Lurayi as Phumzile Cele (season 1 and 4) and Thuli Thabete as Phumzile (season 2 and 3)
- Luke Rous as David Roberts
- Tumi Masemola as Letitia Ramasobane
- Meren Reddy as Gary Moodley

== Production ==
=== Development ===
The concept for the series began with the Luke Rous and Meren Reddy having written a pilot episode for a comedy series originally-titled "Life Out Loud". The pilot script was shared with and workshopped by Joshua Rous, Luke Rous' older brother who was finishing a master's degree in film production from the University of Southern California's prestigious film master's program. Tumi Masemola and Mandla M who Luke and Meren met while studying at the South African School of Motion Picture and Live Performance (AFDA). were then approached to join the cast of the pilot episode. Their friendship and shared experiences formed the foundation for the series, with the team aiming to create a series that authentically depicted the challenges faced by young South Africans living in Johannesburg.

Fresh out of university, they formed the production company Black Brain Pictures in 2004. According to Mandla N, he worked on City Ses'la when he was 19. The group self-funded, wrote, produced, directed, edited, and acted in the pilot themselves. This led to a partnership with Endemol, which provided further support for the show.

Initially, City Ses'la was pitched to SABC 3. It was eventually picked up by SABC 1 in 2005. With the former serving an upper-class English-spesking urban demographic, much of the series had to be reworked, translating the intellectual and culturally nuanced humour of the show into South Africa’s diverse languages to fit in with the latter's language policy. Many of the jokes relied on metaphors and similes that did not easily translate, but as the series progressed, the creative team was given more freedom to adapt the humour to better reflect South African society.

Tumi Masemola described the authenticity of the portrayal and the on-screen chemistry, stating that it is a reflection of their shared experience as friends. Director Joshua Rous also stated that instead of following the traditional sitcom format, the team focused on developing character-driven narratives, thus allowing for more complex interactions between the characters, reflecting the dynamics of their real-life friendships.

=== Filming ===
All 5 seasons of the show were shot at Atlas Studios in Johannesburg,

=== Music ===
Theme music for the series was composed by Bruce Williams, Mighty Music Africa and Gang of Instrumentals.

== Broadcast ==
The series premiered on 2 November 2005 on SABC 1. The show and its 4 seasons have been re-broadcast on SABC multiple times. City Ses'la is also available on the SABC Plus VOD platform from November 2022.

== Spinoff series ==
In 2014, SABC 1 announced the spinoff series, Ses'Top La. Picking after the events of City Ses'La, the series focuses on Themba, now married to Phumzile, as they navigate life in the upperclass Sandton Gold apartments. Mandla N created and executive produced the series, as well as reprised his role with Busi Lurayi. Other City Ses'La cast members were also involved in the production, either behind the scenes or guest starring in their previous roles.
