= Bokang Phelane =

South African actress

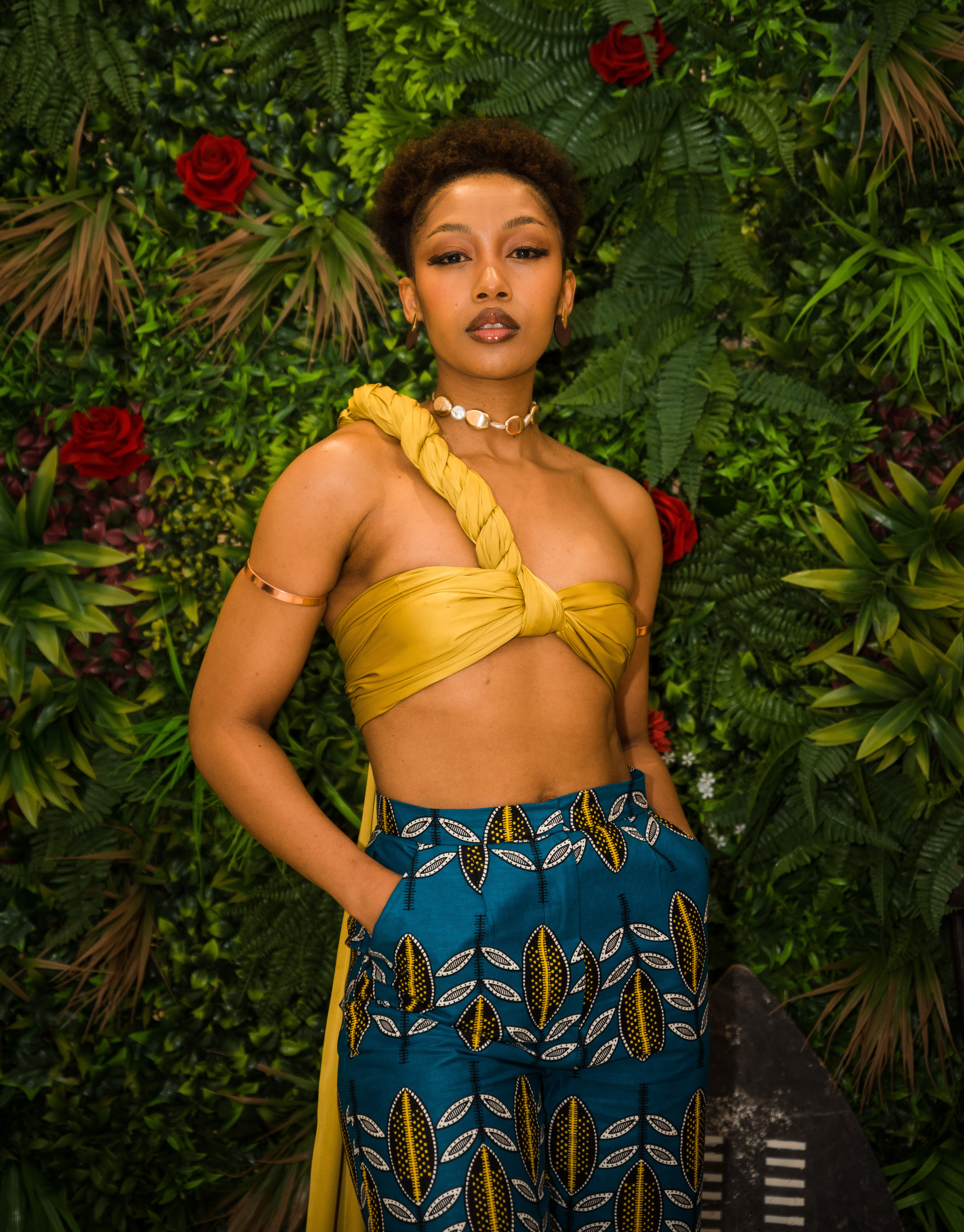
- Bokang Phelane attending The Woman King Premiere in Johannesburg 2022
- Born: Bokang Phelane; April 26, 1990 (age 36); Maseru, Lesotho
- Occupation: Actress
- Years active: 2017 – present
- Known for: Courting Anathi (2023); Giyani -Land of Blood (2023); Blood Psalms (2022); Justice Served (2021); Emoyeni (2018); Shuga (2018); Keeping Score (2017); Single Guys (2017)
- Spouse: Thabo Maretsi
- Children: 1

Bokang Phelane is a Mosotho actress, producer and director.

She is best known for her role as Princess Zazi on Blood Psalms, an epic pre-colonial drama series by Showmax and Canal+. Her journey with acting started in 2016 when she was cast as Celia in Tempy Pushas (Season 3). Since then she has played a multitude of characters including Pula on Keeping Score (SABC 2), Lily on Emoyeni (Netflix), Vanessa on Justice Served (Netflix), and Pele on Giyani – Land of Blood (SABC 2).

Most recently, Bokang is the lead in Akin Omotoso's latest feature film, Courting Anathi (2023).

== Life and education ==
Phelane was born in Maseru, Lesotho. She attended high school in the city of her birth, and later proceeded to Monash University South Africa where she majored in Psychology.

== Career ==
In 2017, Phelane was cast in the comedy TV series, Single Guys, playing the role, "Fezeka". She was also featured in the TV series, Shuga, released in 2018, where she played the role of Andile's wife "Fezeka".

In July 2017, she played the role of Pula in the Season 1 of the South African telenovela, Keeping Scores, shown on SABC2. She played the role of "Lily" in the Zulu language Sci-Fi TV mini-series, Emoyeni (Netflix), released 22 July 2018. She starred in the Sotho language shows, Isipho Sothando, shown in March 2020 and also in Ho Kena Ho Eona, shown in April 2020 both on DSTV. She is the lead in the African mythology epic TV series, Blood Psalms, produced Showmax and Canal+ International in 2022, she plays the role of "Zazi", a fierce teenage princess.

== Filmography ==
Year	Title	Role	Notes
2016	Hard Copy	Khethiwe	TV series
2016	Single Guys	Fezeka	TV series
2017	Keeping Scores	Pula	Telenovela
2018	Angry Amber	Amber	Web series
2018	Emoyeni	Lily	TV mini-series (lead role)
2018	Shuga	Fezeka	TV series
2020	Isipho Sothando	Thando	TV film (lead role)
2020	Ho Kena Ho Eona	Dineo	TV film (lead role, also producer)
2021	Justice Served	Vanessa	TV Series
2020	Kodwa Ma	—	Producer
2021	Istina	—	Director, producer
2022	Blood Psalms	Princess Zazi	TV Series (lead role)
2023	Giyani - Land of Blood	Pele	TV Series
2023	Courting Anathi	Anathi	Feature Film (lead role)
2026	Emzini A Family Legacy	Rorisang Modise	TV Series
