= Nqweba Dam =

Nqweba Dam (org. van Ryneveld's Pass Dam)
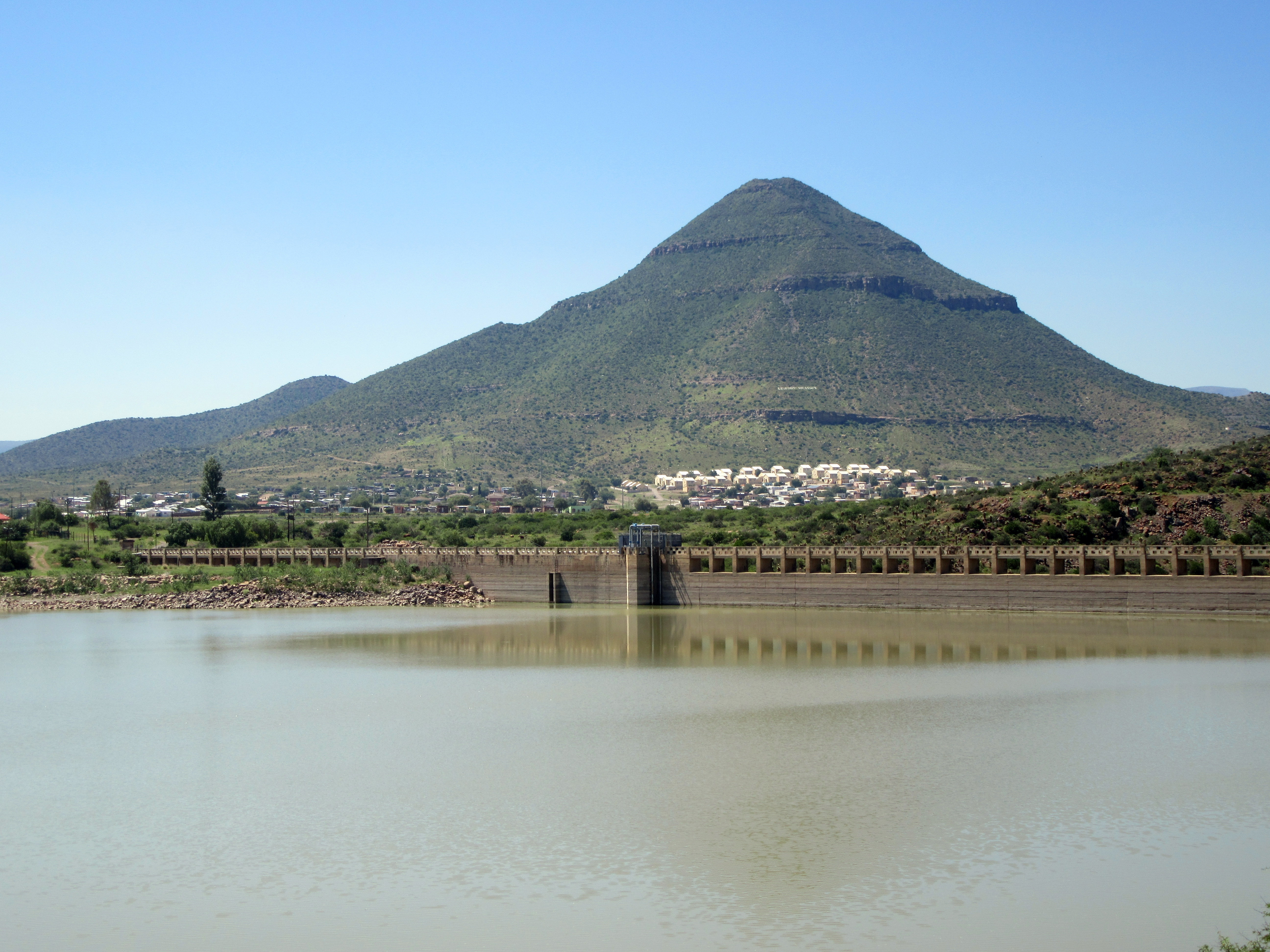

- Location within Eastern Cape Location within South Africa
- Official name: Nqweba Dam
- Country: South Africa
- Location: Camdeboo National Park, Graaff-Reinet
- Coordinates: 32°14′08″S 24°31′40″E
- Construction began: 1920
- Opening date: July 14, 1925; 101 years ago
- Operator: Department of Water and Sanitation

Dam and spillways
- Type of dam: earth-fill
- Impounds: Sondags River
- Height: 46 m (151 ft)
- Length: 357 m (1,171 ft)

Reservoir
- Creates: Nqweba Dam Reservoir
- Total capacity: 46 369 000 m³
- Catchment area: 3 668 km^{2}
- Surface area: 1 028.5 ha

Nqweba Dam (previously known as Van Ryneveld's Pass Dam), is an earth-fill type dam located on the Sundays River in the Camdeboo National Park, in Robert Sobukwe Town, Eastern Cape, South Africa.

It was opened in 1925. The dam has a capacity of 46,369,000 cubic metres (1.6375×10^{9} cu ft), and a surface area of 10.285 square kilometres (3.971 sq mi), the wall is 46 metres (151 ft), and is 357 metres (1,171 ft) long. Once an irrigation dam, it now mainly serves to supply potable water for domestic and industrial use to the residents and businesses of Robert Sobukwe Town. Its hazard potential has been ranked high (3).

== Etymology ==
The new name given in 2001, Nqweba, means "meeting place" in Xhosa.

== Gallery ==
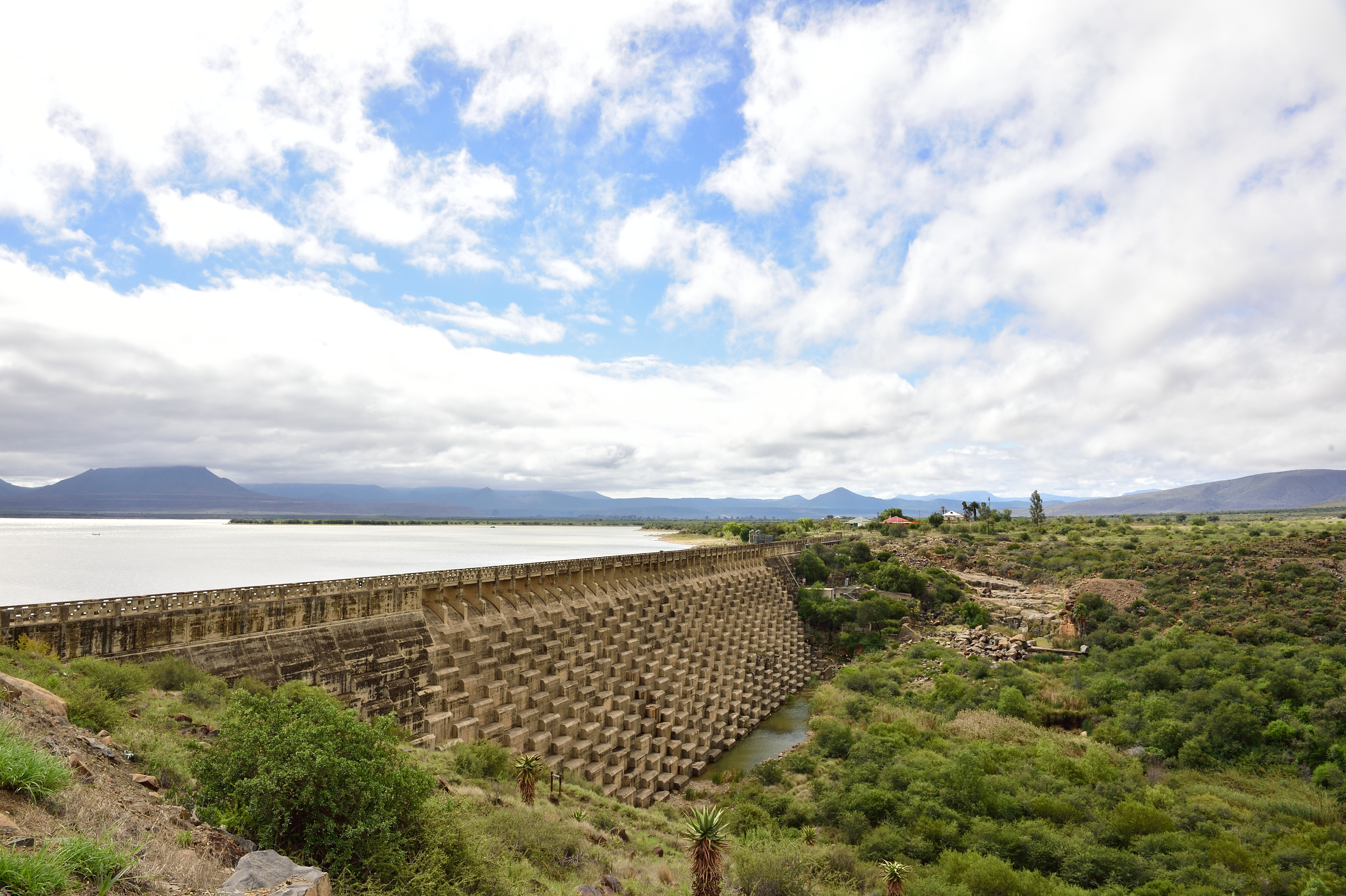
Dam wall

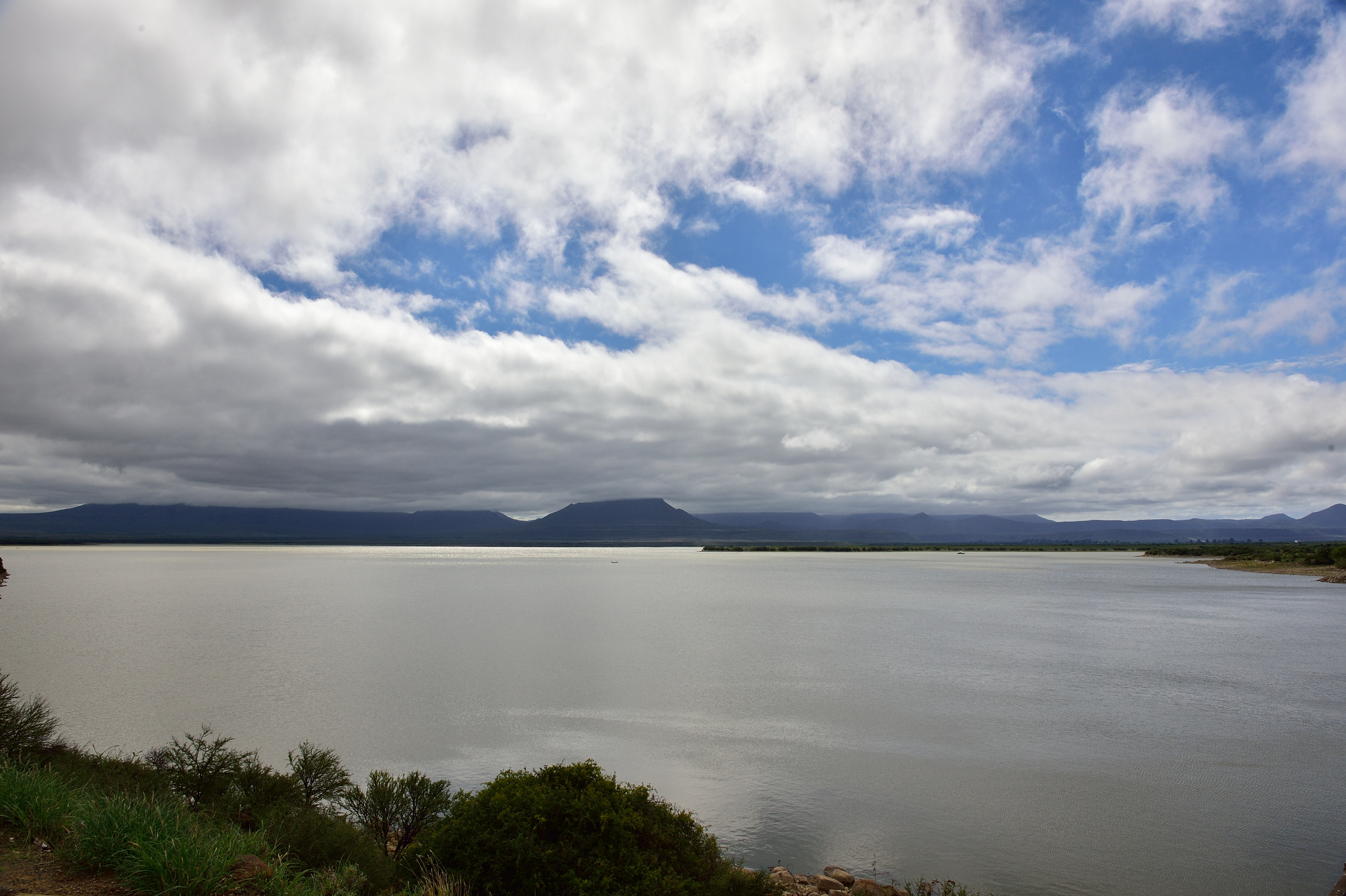

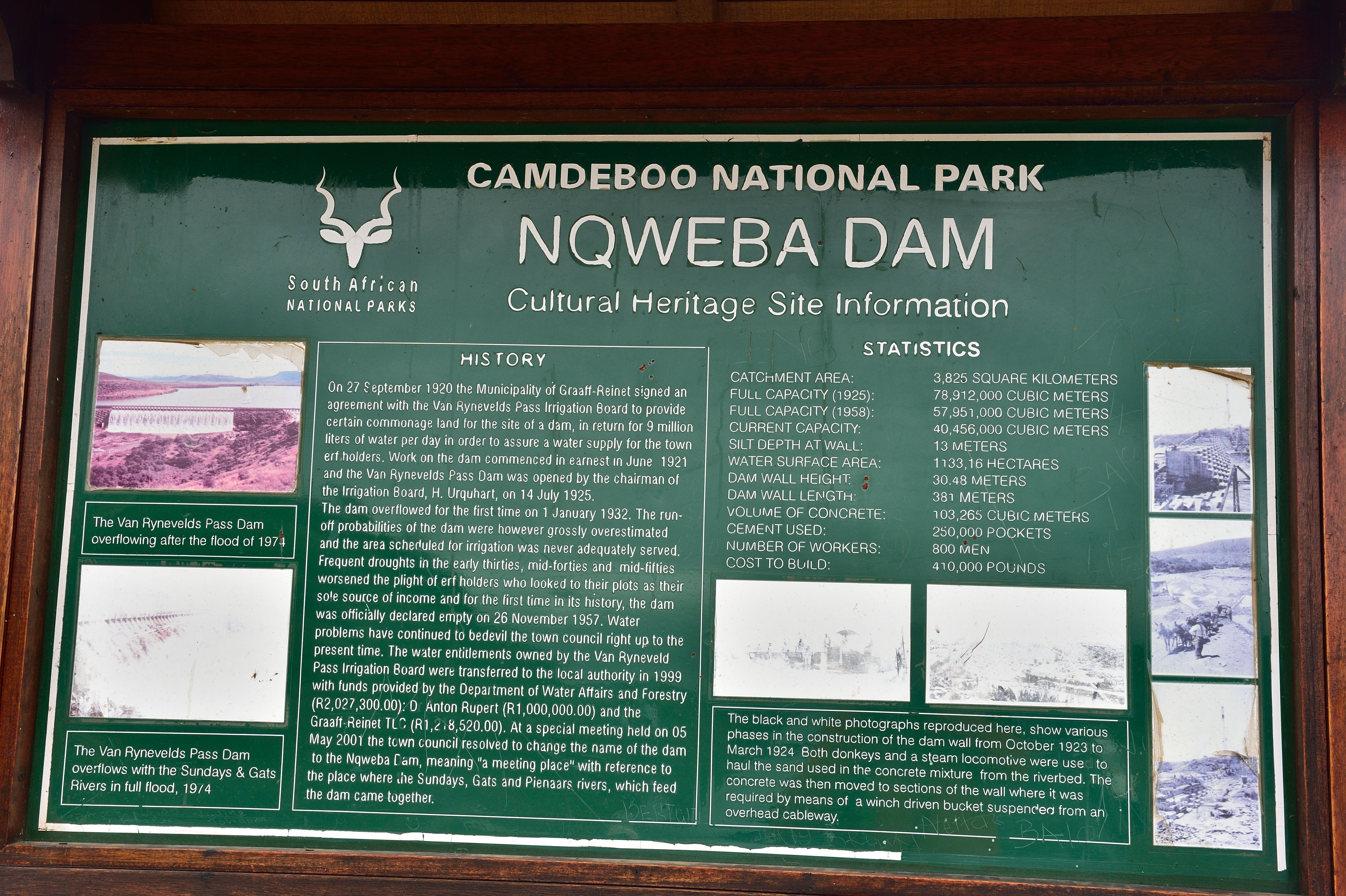
Plaque

== See also ==
- List of reservoirs and dams in South Africa
