= Camdeboo National Park =

National park at Graaff-Reinet in the Eastern Cape, South Africa

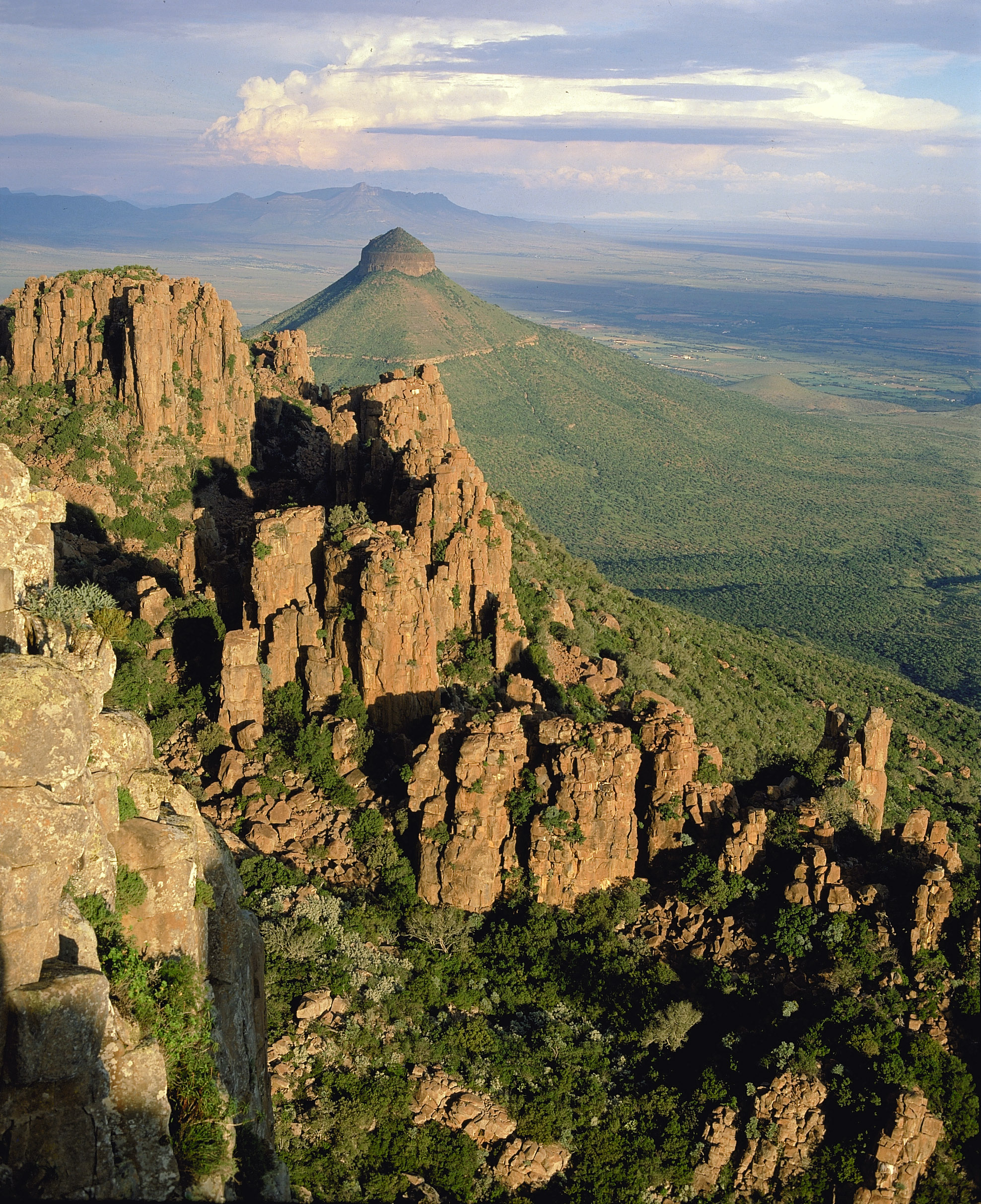
- The towering dolerite rock formation known as the Valley of Desolation, with the Spandaukop in the distance.
- Location of the park
- Location: Eastern Cape, South Africa
- Nearest city: Graaff-Reinet
- Coordinates: 32°15′S 24°30′E
- Area: 194.05 km^{2} (74.92 sq mi)
- Established: 22 July 1983; 42 years ago (Karoo Nature Reserve); 30 October 2005; 20 years ago (Camdeboo National Park)
- Governing body: South African National Parks
- Website: www.sanparks.org/parks/camdeboo
- Camdeboo National Park (South Africa)

The Camdeboo National Park is located in the Karoo and almost completely surrounds the Eastern Cape town of Graaff-Reinet. It contains the Nqweba Dam.

The park is located on the southern foothills of the Sneeuberg Mountain ranges, with an elevation of between 740 and 1480 metres above sea level.

Camdeboo National Park was proclaimed as South Africa's 22nd National Park under the management of South African National Parks on Sunday 30 October 2005. It covers an area of 194 square kilometres.

== History ==
Following an extensive process of negotiation and discussion between government, conservation groups, and concerned stakeholders, Marthinus van Schalkwyk, Minister of Environmental Affairs and Tourism, announced the intention to proclaim South Africa's 22nd National Park in the area surrounding Graaff-Reinet. This was made possible by the World Wide Fund for Nature in South Africa (WWF-SA), which donated the 14500 hectare Karoo Nature Reserve to be the centrepiece of the project.

The Karoo Nature Reserve was established in 1979 when the International Union for the Conservation of Nature and the World Wildlife Fund recognised the urgency for conservation measures in the Karoo biome and listed this action as a world conservation priority.

A public consultation process was followed to decide on the new name for the park, culminating in the choice of Camdeboo National Park. The name comes from the Khoi word !Xamdeboo, 'green valley'.

== Gallery ==
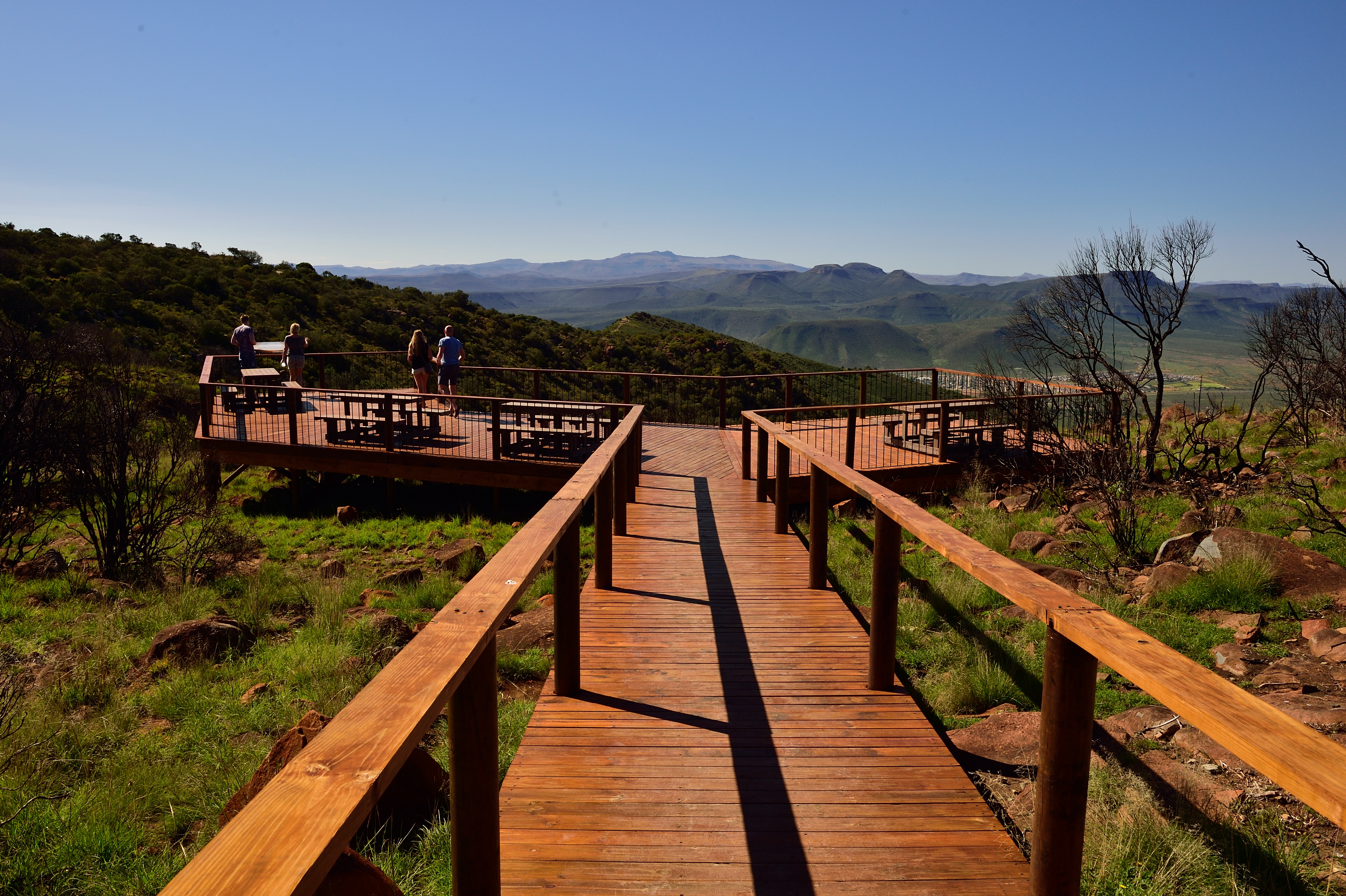
Viewpoint

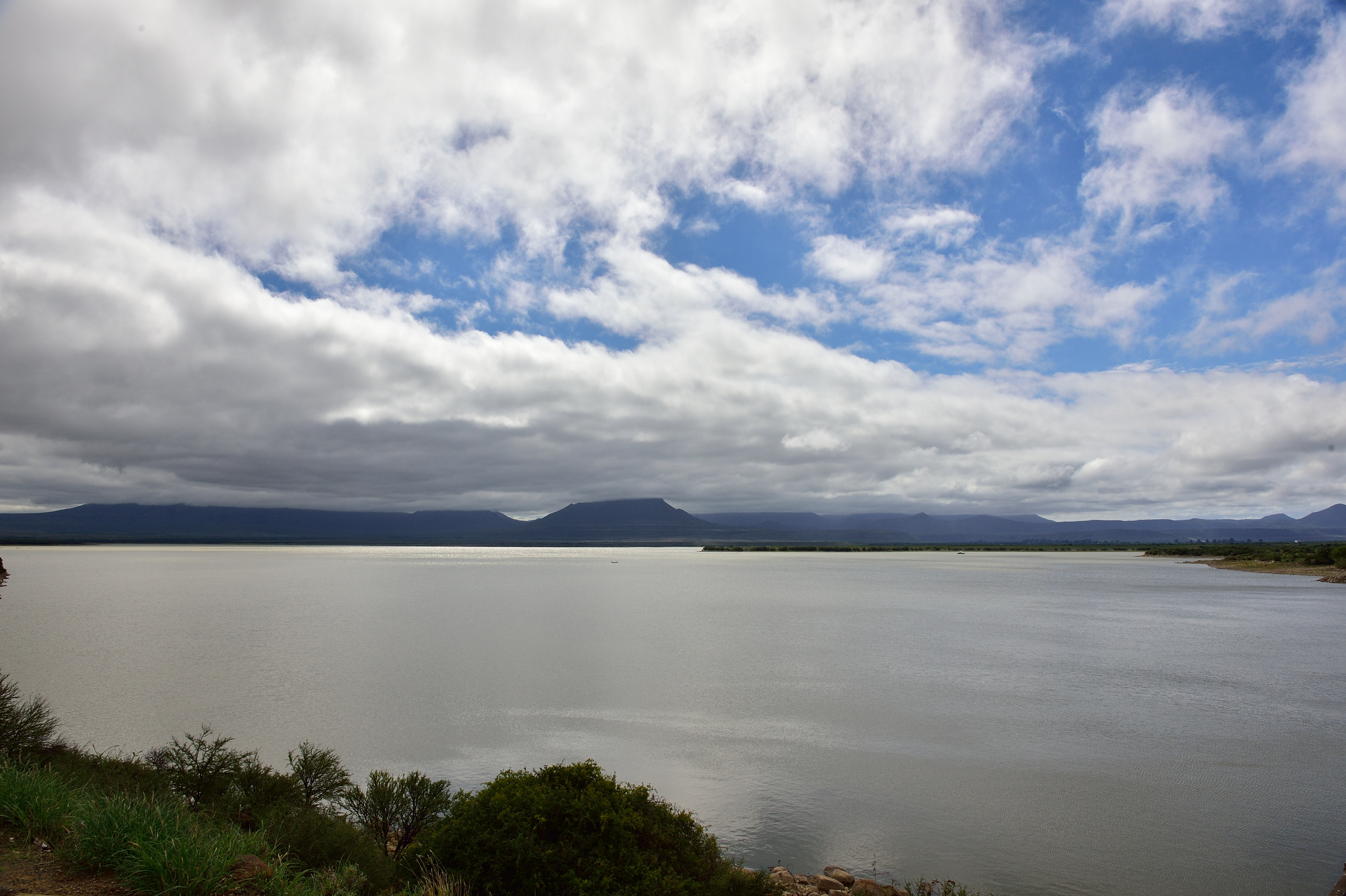
Banks of the Nqweba Dam

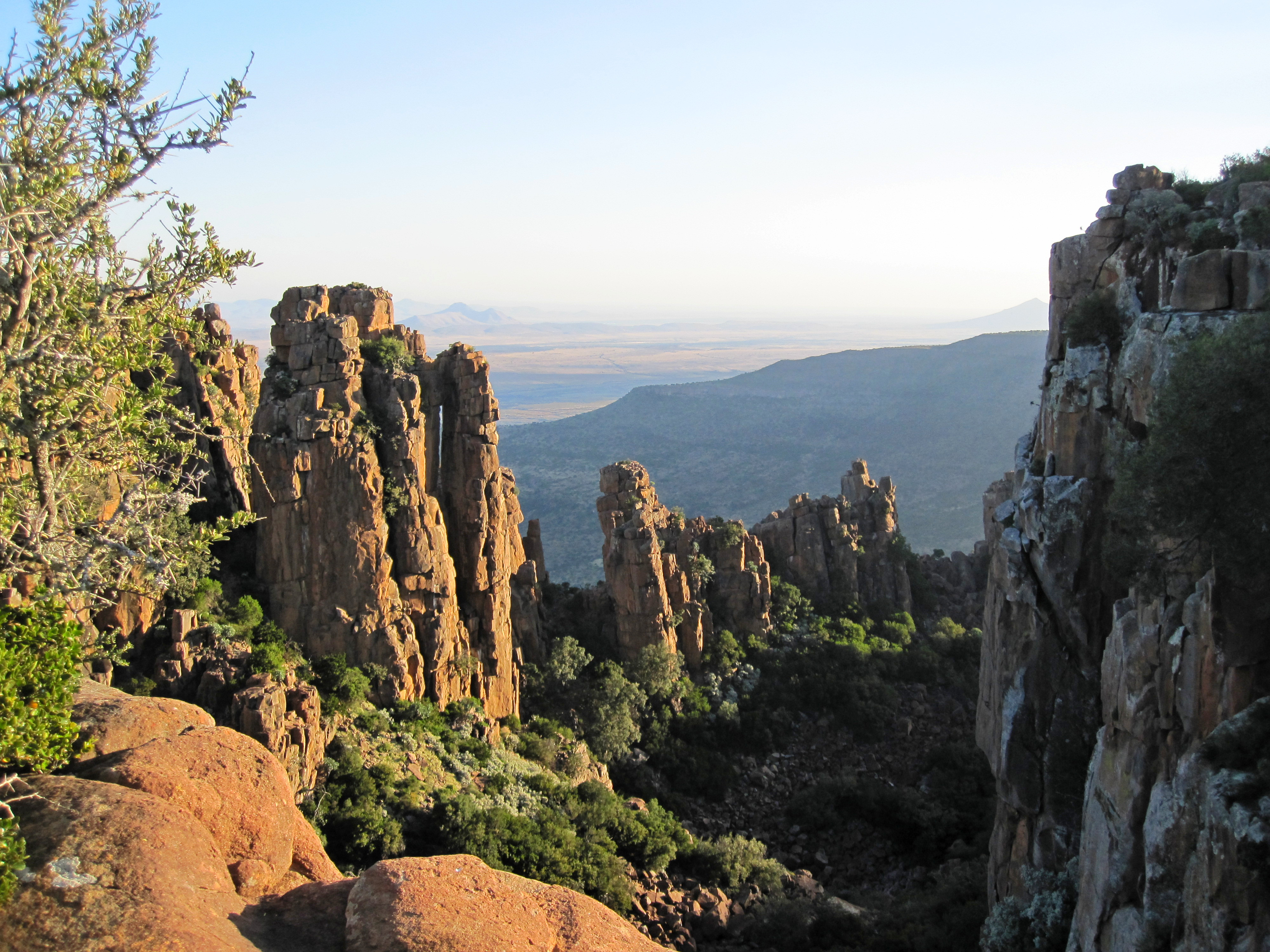
Valley of Desolation

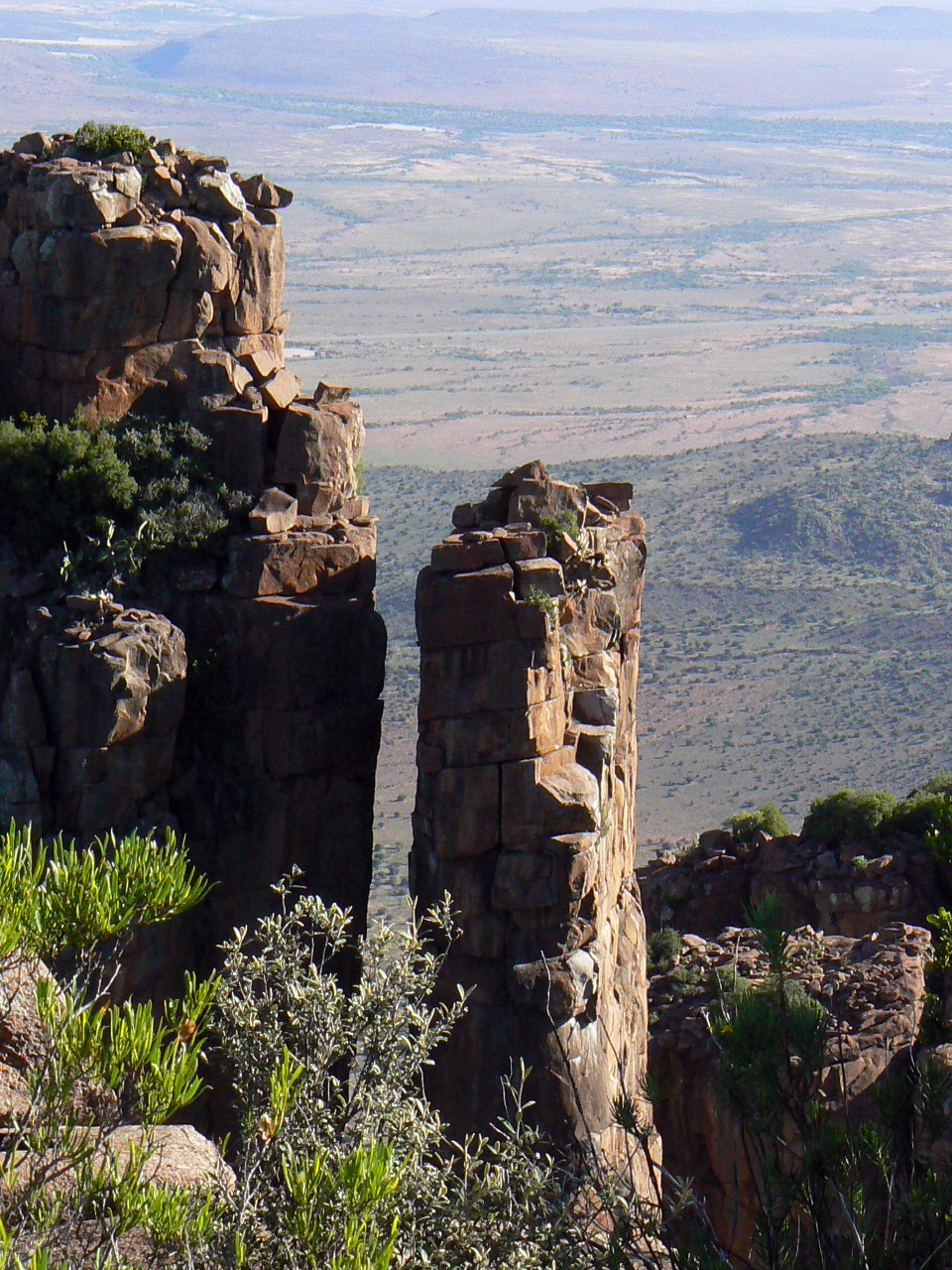
Free-standing pillar in the valley.

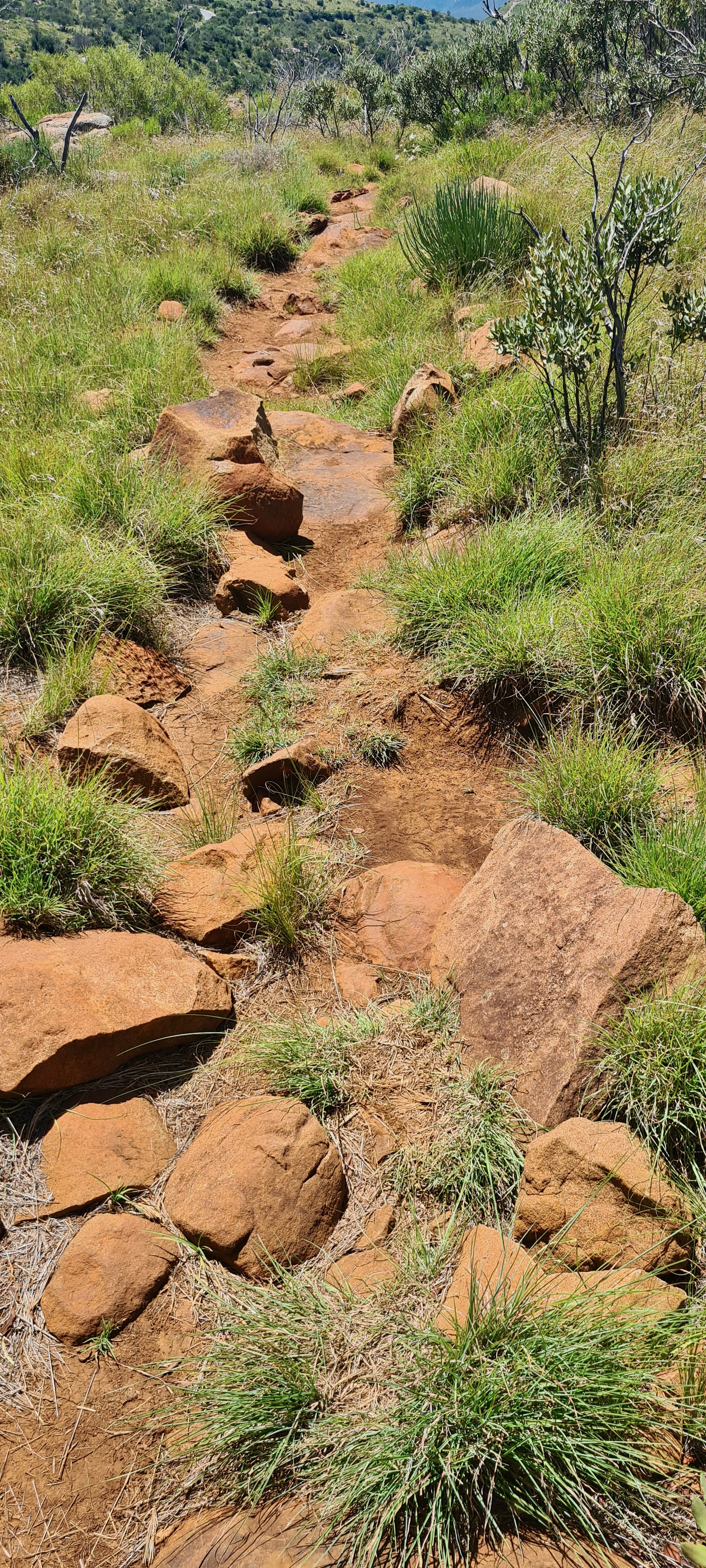
Crag Lizard Trail
