= Warren Masemola =

South African actor (born 1983)

- Born: Montloana Warren Masemola; 18 May 1983 (age 43); Garankuwa, Gauteng, South Africa
- Other name: Shona
- Occupation: Actor
- Years active: 2005–present
- Notable work: Scandal!
- Spouse: Kguagelo Masemola (m. 2017)

Montloana Warren Masemola (born 18 May 1983) is a South African actor popularly known for portraying Lentswe Mokethi on the soap opera Scandal! and Alex Khadzi on House of Zwide.

== Life and career ==
=== Early life and education ===
Montloana Warren Masemola was born on 18 May 1983, in Garankuwa, Gauteng. Masemola relocated to Soshanguve, where he was raised. He completed his matric in 2000 at Tshwane Christian School, then headed to Newton, Johannesburg, for dance. He was enrolled at Moving into Dance, an art school, where he studied for a year before studying drama at the Market Theatre Laboratory, graduating in 2004 after 2 years of study.

=== 2008: Acting career beginnings ===
In 2008, Masemola joined the e.tv soap opera Scandal!, where he played Lentswe Mokethi, an art director. He then starred as Thokozani "Thoko" Chanel on the SABC 1 sitcom Ses'Top La. In 2010, he played the role of Tizozo on SABC 1's Intersexions, a drama series. He has also starred in other popular TV shows such as 90 Plein Street, The Republic, Ayeye, Heist, Ring of Lies, Saints and Sinners, The River, Tjovitjo, Vaya, and Single Galz & Single Guyz. Warren Masemola is now at HOZ (House Of Zwide) fashion e.tv soap which he started to make his first appearance in September 2022, playing the character of the famous glamouras Alex Khadzi who is on a huge battle fashion field with Vusi Kunene as Funani Zwide.

In 2024, Masemola became the winner of the second season of Masked Singer South Africa with his character, Giraffe. In 2026, he acted on a Netflix film called 180 as Lerumo.

== Awards and nominations ==
Year	Award Ceremony	Category	Nominated work	Result	Ref.
2015	SAFTAs / Golden Horn	Best Supporting Actor (TV Comedy)	Ses'Top La	Won	
2017	Africa Movie Academy Award	Best Supporting Actor		Nominated	
2017	SAFTAs	Best Supporting Actor (TV Soap)		Nominated	
2017	SAFTAs	Best Supporting Actor (TV Drama Series)		Won	
2018	SAFTAs	Best Supporting Actor (Feature Film)		Nominated	
2018	SAFTAs	Best Actor (TV Drama)		Won	
2018	SAFTAs	Best Supporting Actor (TV Comedy)		Nominated	
2019	SAFTAs	Best Supporting Actor (Telenovela)		Nominated	
2020	MVCA	Favourite Actor		Won	
2020	SAFTAs / Golden Horn	Best Supporting Actor (TV Comedy)	Single Galz	Won	
2020	SAFTAs / Golden Horn	Best Supporting Actor (Telenovela)	Ring of Lies	Nominated	
2020	SAFTAs / Golden Horn	Best Actor (TV Drama)	Tjovitjo	Nominated	
2023	SAFTAs / Golden Horn	Best Supporting Actor (TV Comedy)	Ses'Top La	Nominated	
