= Thembile Botman =

South African actor

- Born: Nkosi Thembile Botman; 10 June 1976 (age 49); South Africa
- Occupations: Actor, Businessman
- Years active: 2009–present
- Spouse: Nkuli Sibeko

Nkosi Thembile Botman (born 10 June 1976), is a South African actor and businessman.

== Personal life ==
Botman was born on 10 June 1976 in South Africa.

He is married to fellow actress Nkuli Sibeko.

== Career ==
In 2011, he joined with regular cast of the SABC1/SABC2 sitcom Abo Mzala, where he played the role "Mpho" in first three seasons until 2018. In the meantime, he appeared in the Mzansi Magic soap opera Zabalaza with role "Marcus" in 2013 and then in SABC1 musical drama series Loxion Lyric with the role "Hilton" in 2014. After that, he played the role "Shaka" in the eKasi+ comedy drama series uSkroef noSexy. In 2016, he joined with the Mzansi Magic supernatural series Igazi and played the role "Mkhokeli".

Apart from acting, he held fitness workshops across the country along with Vuyo Dabula which was started with an event at Khuma Stadium in Klerksdorp on March 24.

== Arrest ==
In 2019, he was arrested during a protest after a bread truck was looted by the protestors at the Orkney-Potchefstroom Road near Khuma. Then he was charged with bread theft. However in 2020, he escaped imprisonment after charges against him were withdrawn.

== Filmography ==
Year	Film	Role	Genre	Ref.
2006	City Ses'la	Ticket Man	TV series	
2006	Izoso Connexion	Man with Chicken	TV series	
2011	Abo Mzala	Mpho	TV series	
	Generations: The Legacy	Mr Tyali	TV series	
2013	Zabalaza	Marcus	TV series	
2014	Loxion Lyric	Hilton	TV series	
2014	uSkroef noSexy	Shaka	TV series	
2016	Igazi	Mkhokeli	TV series	
