= List of Metro-Goldwyn-Mayer films (2010–2019) =

The following is a list of films originally produced and/or distributed theatrically by Metro-Goldwyn-Mayer and released in the 2010s.

== 2010 ==
Release date	Title	Co-production with	Distributor	Notes
March 26, 2010	Hot Tub Time Machine	United Artists and New Crime Productions	MGM Distribution Co. (North America and select international territories); Lakeshore International (International)	
December 3, 2010	Spud	MGM Television, Rogue Star Films and BLM Productions	MGM Distribution Co. (North America); Nu Metro Films (South Africa)	

== 2011 ==
Release date	Title	Co-production with	Distributor	Notes
July 8, 2011	Zookeeper	Columbia Pictures, Hey Eddie Productions, Happy Madison Productions and Broken Road Productions	Sony Pictures Releasing	
December 20, 2011	The Girl with the Dragon Tattoo	Columbia Pictures, Scott Rudin Productions and Yellow Bird	Sony Pictures Releasing	

== 2012 ==
Release date	Title	Co-production with	Distributor	Notes
March 16, 2012	21 Jump Street	Columbia Pictures, Relativity Media, Original Film and Cannell Studios	Sony Pictures Releasing	
August 8, 2012	Hope Springs	Columbia Pictures, Mandate Pictures, Film 360 and Escape Artists	Sony Pictures Releasing (North America); Mandate International (International)	
November 2, 2012	Magic Mike	FilmNation Entertainment, Nick Wechsler Productions, Iron Horse Entertainment and Extension 765	MGM	Latin American distribution only
November 9, 2012	Skyfall	Columbia Pictures and Eon Productions	MGM (digital, home entertainment and television rights); Sony Pictures Releasing (theatrical rights); SF Studios (Scandinavia); Forum Film (Poland, Hungary, Romania, Bulgaria, Czech Republic, Slovakia and Israel); ZON Lusomundo (Portugal); Gulf Film (Middle East)	
November 21, 2012	Red Dawn	United Artists, FilmNation Entertainment and Contrafilm	FilmDistrict	uncredited
December 14, 2012	The Hobbit: An Unexpected Journey	New Line Cinema and WingNut Films	Warner Bros. Pictures (theatrical, home entertainment and domestic digital and television rights); MGM (international digital and television rights); SF Studios (Scandinavia); Forum Film (Poland, Hungary, Romania, Bulgaria and Israel); ZON Lusomundo (Portugal); Gulf Film (Middle East)	

== 2013 ==
Release date	Title	Co-production with	Distributor	Notes
January 25, 2013	Hansel & Gretel: Witch Hunters	MTV Films, Gary Sanchez Productions, and Babelsberg Studio	Paramount Pictures (theatrical, home entertainment and domestic digital and television rights); MGM (international digital and television rights); SF Studios (Scandinavia)	
March 28, 2013	G.I. Joe: Retaliation	Skydance Media, Hasbro Studios and Di Bonaventura Pictures	Paramount Pictures (theatrical, home entertainment and domestic digital and television rights); MGM (international digital and television rights)	
June 21, 2013	Spud 2: The Madness Continues	MGM Television and Rogue Star Films	MGM Distribution Co. (North America); Nu Metro Films (South Africa)	
September 20, 2013	Diana	MGM Television, Ecosse Films, Le Pacte, Film i Väst, Filmgate Films, Scope Pictures, and MP Film	MGM Distribution Co. (North America); Entertainment One (United Kingdom); Le Pacte (France); Svensk Filmindustri (Sweden, Finland and Norway); Cinéart (Belgium)	
October 4, 2013	Grace Unplugged	Orion Pictures, Roadside Attractions and Coram Deo Studios	Lionsgate	
October 18, 2013	Carrie	Screen Gems and Misher Films	MGM (digital, home entertainment and television rights); Sony Pictures Releasing (theatrical rights); SF Studios (Scandinavia); Forum Film (Poland, Hungary, Romania, Bulgaria, Czech Republic, Slovakia and Israel); ZON Lusomundo (Portugal); Gulf Film (Middle East)	
December 13, 2013	The Hobbit: The Desolation of Smaug	New Line Cinema and WingNut Films	Warner Bros. Pictures (theatrical, home entertainment and domestic digital and television rights); MGM (international digital and television rights); SF Studios (Scandinavia); Forum Film (Poland, Hungary, Romania, Bulgaria and Israel); ZON Lusomundo (Portugal); Gulf Film (Middle East)	

== 2014 ==
Release date	Title	Co-production with	Distributor	Notes
February 12, 2014	RoboCop	Columbia Pictures and Strike Entertainment	MGM (digital, home entertainment and television rights); Sony Pictures Releasing (theatrical rights); StudioCanal (United Kingdom, Ireland, France, Germany, Austria and Switzerland); SF Studios (Scandinavia); Forum Film (Poland, Hungary, Romania, Bulgaria, Czech Republic, Slovakia and Israel); ZON Lusomundo (Portugal); Gulf Film (Middle East)	
June 13, 2014	22 Jump Street	Columbia Pictures, LStar Capital, MRC, Original Film, Cannell Studios, Storyville, and 75 Year Plan Productions	Sony Pictures Releasing	
July 25, 2014	Hercules	Flynn Picture Company, RatPac-Dune Entertainment and Radical Studios	Paramount Pictures (theatrical and home entertainment rights); MGM (digital and television rights); SF Studios (Scandinavia); Forum Film (Poland, Hungary, Romania, Bulgaria, Czech Republic, Slovakia and Israel); NOS Audiovisuais (Portugal); Gulf Film (Middle East)	
August 22, 2014	If I Stay	New Line Cinema and Di Novi Pictures	MGM (digital, home entertainment and television rights); Warner Bros. Pictures (theatrical rights); SF Studios (Scandinavia); Forum Film (Poland, Hungary, Romania, Bulgaria, Czech Republic, Slovakia and Israel); NOS Audiovisuais (Portugal); Gulf Film (Middle East)	
October 14, 2014	The Town That Dreaded Sundown	Orion Pictures, Blumhouse Productions and Ryan Murphy Productions	Orion Pictures	
November 15, 2014	Spud 3: Learning to Fly	MGM Television and Rogue Star Films	MGM Distribution Co. (North America); Nu Metro Films (South Africa)	
December 4, 2014	Tell	Orion Pictures, Haven Entertainment, American Film Productions, Divide Pictures and Bron Studios	Orion Pictures	
December 17, 2014	The Hobbit: The Battle of the Five Armies	New Line Cinema and WingNut Films	Warner Bros. Pictures (theatrical, home entertainment and domestic digital and television rights); MGM (international digital and television rights); SF Studios (Scandinavia); Forum Film (Poland, Hungary, Romania, Bulgaria and Israel); NOS Audiovisuais (Portugal); Gulf Film (Middle East)	

== 2015 ==
Release date	Title	Co-production with	Distributor	Notes
January 22, 2015	We'll Never Have Paris	Bifrost Pictures, The Bridge Finance Company, E2B Capital, H3 Films, Marc Platt Productions, PalmStar Entertainment, K5 International and Dog Eared Pictures	Orion Pictures	North American distribution only
February 20, 2015	Hot Tub Time Machine 2	United Artists and Panay Films	Paramount Pictures (theatrical and home entertainment rights); MGM (digital and television rights); SF Studios (Scandinavia); Gulf Film (Middle East)	
March 13, 2015	Night Owls	Haven Entertainment and Pan & Scan Pictures	Orion Pictures; FilmBuff	distribution only
May 8, 2015	Hot Pursuit	New Line Cinema and Pacific Standard	Warner Bros. Pictures (theatrical and home entertainment rights); MGM (digital and television rights); SF Studios (Scandinavia); Forum Film (Poland, Hungary, Romania, Bulgaria, Czech Republic, Slovakia and Israel); NOS Audiovisuais (Portugal); Gulf Film (Middle East)	
May 8, 2015	Winning: The Racing Life of Paul Newman	Gearhead Films, Mollette and Sontalia	Orion Pictures; Filmbuff	distribution only
May 22, 2015	Poltergeist	Fox 2000 Pictures, Ghost House Pictures and Vertigo Entertainment	20th Century Fox (theatrical, home entertainment and domestic digital and television rights); MGM (international digital and television rights); SF Studios (Scandinavia); Forum Film (Poland, Hungary, Romania, Bulgaria, Czech Republic, Slovakia and Israel); NOS Audiovisuais (Portugal); Gulf Film (Middle East)	
June 19, 2015	Balls Out	Ralph Smyth Entertainment and Red Productions	Orion Pictures; MGM	North and Latin American distribution only
June 26, 2015	Max	Sunswept Entertainment	Warner Bros. Pictures (theatrical, home entertainment and domestic digital and television rights); MGM (international digital and television rights); SF Studios (Scandinavia); Gulf Film (Middle East)	
August 14, 2015	Fort Tilden	–	Orion Pictures	U.S. and Latin American distribution only
November 6, 2015	Spectre	Columbia Pictures and Eon Productions	MGM (digital, home entertainment and television rights); Sony Pictures Releasing (theatrical rights); SF Studios (Scandinavia); Forum Film (Poland, Hungary, Romania, Bulgaria, Czech Republic, Slovakia and Israel); NOS Audiovisuais (Portugal); Gulf Film (Middle East)	
November 25, 2015	Creed	New Line Cinema and Chartoff-Winkler Productions	Warner Bros. Pictures (theatrical and home entertainment rights); MGM (digital and television rights); SF Studios (Scandinavia); Forum Film (Poland, Hungary, Romania, Bulgaria, Czech Republic, Slovakia and Israel); NOS Audiovisuais (Portugal); Gulf Film (Middle East)	
December 4, 2015	The Wannabe	Electric Entertainment and Traction Media	Orion Pictures; Momentum Pictures	U.S. and select international distribution only

== 2016 ==
Release date	Title	Co-production with	Distributor	Notes
January 8, 2016	Diablo	Space Rock Studios	Orion Pictures; Momentum Pictures	distribution only
February 12, 2016	How to Be Single	New Line Cinema, RatPac Entertainment and Flower Films	Warner Bros. Pictures	
March 4, 2016	Ava's Possessions	ODD NY, Off Hollywood Pictures, Ravenous Films and Traction Media	Orion Pictures; Momentum Pictures	U.S. and select international distribution only
March 11, 2016	Pet	Magic Lantern and Revolver Picture Company	Orion Pictures; Samuel Goldwyn Films	U.S. distribution only
March 25, 2016	Jane Wants a Boyfriend	Copperline Creative	Orion Pictures; Filmbuff	distribution only
April 15, 2016	Barbershop: The Next Cut	New Line Cinema and Cube Vision	Warner Bros. Pictures (theatrical and home entertainment rights); MGM (digital and television rights); SF Studios (Scandinavia)	
May 20, 2016	Welcome to Happiness	Minutehand Pictures	Orion Pictures; Filmbuff	distribution only
June 3, 2016	Me Before You	New Line Cinema and Sunswept Entertainment	Warner Bros. Pictures (theatrical, home entertainment and domestic digital and television rights); MGM (international digital and television rights); SF Studios (Scandinavia); Forum Film (Poland, Hungary, Romania, Bulgaria, Czech Republic, Slovakia and Israel); NOS Audiovisuais (Portugal); Gulf Film (Middle East)	
June 17, 2016	No Stranger Than Love	Pangaea Pictures and Innis Lake Entertainment	Orion Pictures; Momentum Pictures	North American distribution only
July 1, 2016	Buddymoon	–	Orion Pictures; Gravitas Ventures	distribution only
July 15, 2016	Outlaws and Angels	No Remake Pictures, Burnt Pictures, Redwire Pictures, Avery Productions, Casadelic Pictures and New Golden Age Films	Orion Pictures; Momentum Pictures	distribution only
July 22, 2016	Don't Worry Baby	Manamarin and The Sight Group	Orion Pictures; FilmBuff	U.S. distribution only
August 19, 2016	Ben-Hur	Lightworkers Media and Sean Daniel Company	Paramount Pictures (theatrical and home entertainment rights); MGM (digital and television rights); SF Studios (Scandinavia); Forum Film (Poland, Hungary, Romania, Bulgaria, Czech Republic, Slovakia and Israel); NOS Audiovisuais (Portugal); Gulf Film (Middle East)	
September 23, 2016	The Magnificent Seven	Columbia Pictures, Village Roadshow Pictures, LStar Capital, Escape Artists and Pin High Productions	Sony Pictures Releasing (theatrical and home entertainment rights); MGM (digital and television rights); SF Studios (Scandinavia); Forum Film (Poland, Hungary, Romania, Bulgaria, Czech Republic, Slovakia and Israel); NOS Audiovisuais (Portugal); Gulf Film (Middle East)	
November 3, 2016	My Dead Boyfriend	Cohen Media Group	Orion Pictures; Momentum Pictures	U.S. and select international distribution only
November 4, 2016	Trash Fire	Circle of Confusion and Snowfort Pictures	Orion Pictures; Vertical Entertainment	distribution only
November 11, 2016	Dreamland	Beachwood Park Films and Tilt/Shift Films	Orion Pictures; Gunpowder & Sky	distribution only
December 1, 2016	Pocket Listing	Helios Productions and Mythmaker Productions	Orion Pictures; Momentum Pictures	distribution only
December 2, 2016	Run the Tide	1821 Pictures	Orion Pictures; Momentum Pictures	distribution only

== 2017 ==
Release date	Title	Co-production with	Distributor	Notes
February 3, 2017	Youth in Oregon	Sundial Pictures and Campfire	Orion Pictures; Samuel Goldwyn Films	distribution only
February 17, 2017	My Name Is Emily	Newgrange Pictures, Kennedy Films, Garage Film and Paradox	Orion Pictures; Monument Releasing	North and Latin American distribution only
March 17, 2017	The Belko Experiment	Orion Pictures and The Safran Company	Blumhouse Tilt	
May 5, 2017	Max 2: White House Hero	Orion Pictures and Sunswept Entertainment	Warner Bros. Home Entertainment	
May 19, 2017	Everything, Everything	Alloy Entertainment	Warner Bros. Pictures (theatrical, home entertainment and domestic digital and television rights); MGM (international digital and television rights); SF Studios (Scandinavia); Forum Film (Poland, Hungary, Romania, Bulgaria, Czech Republic, Slovakia and Israel); NOS Audiovisuais (Portugal); Gulf Film (Middle East)	
June 2, 2017	Past Life	Metro Communications, Artomas Communications, Ars Veritas Productions and Sunshine Films	Orion Pictures; Samuel Goldwyn Films	U.S. distribution only
July 14, 2017	Wish Upon	Orion Pictures and Busted Shark Productions	Broad Green Pictures	
August 24, 2017	Detroit	Annapurna Pictures, First Light Productions and Page 1	MGM	international distribution outside the U.K., Ireland, Australia, New Zealand, South Africa, France, Spain, Italy, the Benelux, the CIS, Japan and Korea only
September 29, 2017	The Sound	Hackybox Pictures, North Hollywood Films and WeatherVane Productions	Orion Pictures; Samuel Goldwyn Films	U.S. distribution only
October 25, 2017	God's Own Country	BFI, Creative England, Met Film Production, Shudder Films, Inflammable Films and Magic Bear Productions	Orion Pictures; Samuel Goldwyn Films	U.S. distribution only
October 27, 2017	Maya Dardel		Orion Pictures; Samuel Goldwyn Films	North American distribution only
November 10, 2017	The Price	Hacienda Motion Picture Company, Infinitum Productions, Ten on 5 Productions and Water's End Productions	Orion Pictures; Samuel Goldwyn Films	North American distribution only
November 17, 2017	Almost Friends	Let It Play and Animus Films	Orion Pictures; Gravitas Ventures	North American distribution only

== 2018 ==
Release date	Title	Co-production with	Distributor	Notes
February 23, 2018	Every Day	Orion Pictures, Likely Story, FilmWave, Scythia Films, and Silver Reel	Orion Pictures	
March 2, 2018	Death Wish	Cave 76	Mirror Releasing (United States); Entertainment One (Canada); Vertigo Releasing (United Kingdom and Ireland); Rialto Distribution (Australia and New Zealand); TF1 Studio and Paramount Pictures (France); Universum Film (Germany and Austria); Ascot Elite Entertainment Group (Switzerland); SF Studios (Scandinavia); Forum Film (Poland, Hungary, Romania, Bulgaria, Czech Republic, Slovakia and Israel); NOS Audiovisuais (Portugal); Phars Film (Middle East); Eagle Pictures (Italy); Times Media Films (South Africa); BF Distribution (Argentina); Imagem Filmes (Brazil); Dutch FilmWorks (Netherlands); Kinepolis Film Distribution (Belgium); Filmax (Spain); Myndform (Iceland); The Moments Entertainment (Turkey); Blitz (former Yugoslavia); Odeon (Greece and Cyprus); Multimedia Distribution (Ukraine); Carnival Motion Pictures (India); OctoArts Films (Philippines); Shaw Organisation (Singapore); Big Screen Entertainment Group (China); Showgate (Japan); The Coup Distribution (Korea)	
March 16, 2018	Tomb Raider	Square Enix and GK Films	Warner Bros. Pictures (theatrical and home entertainment rights); MGM (digital and television rights); SF Studios (Scandinavia); Forum Film (Poland, Hungary, Romania, Bulgaria, Czech Republic, Slovakia and Israel); NOS Audiovisuais (Portugal); Gulf Film (Middle East)	
March 23, 2018	Sherlock Gnomes	Paramount Animation and Rocket Pictures	Paramount Pictures (theatrical, home entertainment and domestic digital and television rights); MGM (international digital and television rights); SF Studios (Scandinavia); NOS Audiovisuais (Portugal); Gulf Film (Middle East); JL Vision Film (China)	
May 4, 2018	Overboard	Pantelion Films and 3Pas Studios	Lionsgate (United States); Renaissance Media (Canada); Vertigo Releasing (United Kingdom and Ireland); Rialto Distribution (Australia and New Zealand); Kinostar (Germany and Austria); SF Studios (Scandinavia); Forum Film (Poland, Hungary, Romania, Bulgaria, Czech Republic, Slovakia and Israel); NOS Audiovisuais (Portugal); Gulf Film (Middle East); Eagle Pictures (Italy); Times Media Films (South Africa); Dutch FilmWorks (Netherlands); Kinepolis Film Distribution (Belgium); Filmax (Spain); Myndform (Iceland); Blitz (former Yugoslavia); Odeon (Greece and Cyprus); Paradise Group (Russia); Multimedia Distribution (Ukraine); OctoArts Films (Philippines)	
August 29, 2018	Operation Finale	Automatik Entertainment	Mirror Releasing (North America); Netflix (International)	
October 5, 2018	A Star Is Born	Joint Effort, Gerber Pictures, Peters Entertainment and Live Nation Entertainment	Warner Bros. Pictures	credit only
October 19, 2018	Fahrenheit 11/9	Midwestern Films, Dog Eat Dog Films and State Run Films	MGM	U.K., Irish and Latin American distribution only
November 9, 2018	The Girl in the Spider's Web	Columbia Pictures, Scott Rudin Productions, Yellow Bird, The Cantillon Company, Regency Enterprises and Pascal Pictures	Sony Pictures Releasing	
November 21, 2018	Creed II	New Line Cinema and Chartoff-Winkler Productions	Warner Bros. Pictures (theatrical and home entertainment rights); MGM (digital and television rights); SF Studios (Scandinavia); Forum Film (Poland, Hungary, Romania, Bulgaria, Czech Republic, Slovakia and Israel); NOS Audiovisuais (Portugal); Gulf Film (Middle East); JL Vision Film (China)	
December 7, 2018	Anna and the Apocalypse	Orion Pictures, Blazing Griffin, Parkhouse Pictures and Creative Scotland	Mirror Releasing	North and Latin American distribution only
December 28, 2018	Vice	Annapurna Pictures, Gary Sanchez Productions and Plan B Entertainment	MGM	international distribution outside the U.K., Ireland, Australia, New Zealand, South Africa, France, Spain, Italy, the Benelux, the CIS, Japan and Korea only

== 2019 ==
Release date	Title	Co-production with	Distributor	Notes
February 8, 2019	The Prodigy	Orion Pictures and Vinson Films		
February 14, 2019	Fighting with My Family	Film4 Productions, Misher Films, Seven Bucks Productions, The Ink Factory and WWE Studios	Mirror Releasing (United States and digital and television rights); Universal Pictures (home entertainment and international theatrical rights); Lionsgate (United Kingdom and Ireland); SF Studios (Scandinavia); Forum Film (Poland, Hungary, Romania, Bulgaria, Czech Republic, Slovakia and Israel); NOS Audiovisuais (Portugal); Gulf Film (Middle East); Eagle Pictures (Italy); Empire Entertainment (South Africa)	distribution only
May 10, 2019	The Hustle	Pin High Productions and Camp Sugar Productions	United Artists Releasing (United States and digital and television rights); Universal Pictures (home entertainment and international theatrical rights); SF Studios (Scandinavia); Forum Film (Poland, Hungary, Romania, Bulgaria, Czech Republic, Slovakia and Israel; NOS Audiovisuais (Portugal); Gulf Film (Middle East); Eagle Pictures (Italy); Empire Entertainment (South Africa)	
May 24, 2019	Booksmart	Annapurna Pictures and Gloria Sanchez Productions	MGM	international distribution outside the U.K., Ireland, Australia, New Zealand, South Africa, France, Spain, Italy, the Benelux, the CIS, Japan and Korea only
May 17, 2019	The Sun is Also a Star	Alloy Entertainment	Warner Bros. Pictures (theatrical, home entertainment and domestic digital and television rights); MGM (international digital and television rights); Forum Film (Poland, Hungary, Romania, Bulgaria, Czech Republic, Slovakia and Israel); NOS Audiovisuais (Portugal); Gulf Film (Middle East)	
June 21, 2019	Child's Play	Orion Pictures, Bron Studios, Creative Wealth Media Finance and KatzSmith Productions	United Artists Releasing	
August 16, 2019	Where'd You Go, Bernadette	Annapurna Pictures, Color Force and Detour Filmproduction	MGM	international distribution outside the U.K., Ireland, Australia, New Zealand, South Africa, France, Spain, Italy, the Benelux, the CIS, Japan and Korea only
October 11, 2019	The Addams Family	Bron Studios, Creative Wealth Media Finance, Cinesite Studios, The Jackal Group, and BermanBraun	United Artists Releasing (United States and digital and television rights); Universal Pictures (home entertainment and international theatrical rights); SF Studios (Scandinavia); Forum Film (Poland, Hungary, Romania, Bulgaria, Czech Republic, Slovakia and Israel); NOS Audiovisuais (Portugal); Gulf Film (Middle East); Eagle Pictures (Italy); Empire Entertainment (South Africa)	

== See also ==
- Lists of Metro-Goldwyn-Mayer films
