= List of John Cleese performances =

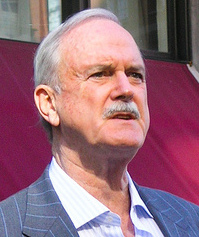
John Cleese in 2008

John Cleese is an English actor, comedian, producer, screenwriter and writer. He is known for his work on screen and stage. He was a member of the comedy sketch group Monty Python. This is a filmography of his work which consists of about 180 various roles.

== Film ==
Year	Title	Role	Notes
1968	Interlude	TV Publicist	
1968	The Bliss of Mrs. Blossom	Post Office Clerk	
1969	The Magic Christian	Mr. Dougdale	
1969	The Best House in London	Jones	Uncredited
1970	The Rise and Rise of Michael Rimmer	Pumer	Also writer
1971	And Now for Something Completely Different	Various Roles	Also writer
1971	The Statue	Harry	
1973	The Love Ban	Contraceptives Lecturer	
1974	Romance with a Double Bass	Musician Smychkov	Also writer
1975	Monty Python and the Holy Grail	Various Roles	Also writer
1976	Meetings, Bloody Meetings	Manager / Various Roles	Also writer
1977	The Strange Case of the End of Civilization as We Know It	Arthur Sherlock Holmes	Also writer
1979	Monty Python's Life of Brian	Various Roles	Also writer
1981	The Great Muppet Caper	Neville	Cameo
1981	Time Bandits	Gormless Robin Hood	
1982	Privates on Parade	Major Giles Flack	
1982	Monty Python Live at the Hollywood Bowl	Various Roles	Concert film; also writer
1983	Yellowbeard	Harvey "Blind" Pew	
1983	Monty Python's The Meaning of Life	Various Roles	Also writer
1985	Silverado	Sherriff Langston	
1986	Clockwise	Mr. Stimpson	
1988	A Fish Called Wanda	Barrister Archie Leach	Also writer and executive producer
1989	Erik the Viking	Halfdan The Black	
1989	The Big Picture	The Bartender	Cameo
1990	Bullseye!	Man On The Beach Who Looks Like John Cleese	Cameo
1991	An American Tail: Fievel Goes West	Cat R. Waul	Voice
1993	Splitting Heirs	Raoul P. Shadgrind	
1994	Mary Shelley's Frankenstein	Professor Waldman	
1994	The Jungle Book	Dr. Julius Plumford	
1994	The Swan Princess	Jean-Bob the Frog	Voice
1996	The Wind in the Willows	Mr. Toad's Lawyer	Cameo
1997	Fierce Creatures	Rollo Lee	Also writer and producer
1997	George of the Jungle	Ape	Voice
1998	In the Wild: Operation Lemur with John Cleese	The Narrator	Documentary
1999	The Out-of-Towners	Mr. Mersault	
1999	The World Is Not Enough	R	
2000	Isn't She Great	Henry Marcus	
2000	The Magic Pudding	Albert The Magic Pudding	Voice
2001	Quantum Project	Alexander Pentcho	
2001	Here's Looking at You: The Evolution of the Human Face	The Narrator	Documentary
2001	Rat Race	Donald P. Sinclair	
2001	Harry Potter and the Philosopher's Stone	Nearly Headless Nick	
2002	Harry Potter and the Chamber of Secrets	Nearly Headless Nick	
2002	Roberto Benigni's Pinocchio	The Talking Cricket	Voice; English dub
2002	Die Another Day	Q	
2002	The Adventures of Pluto Nash	James	
2003	Charlie's Angels: Full Throttle	Mr. Munday	
2003	Scorched	Charles Merchant	
2003	George of the Jungle 2	Ape	Voice
2004	Shrek 2	Harold	Voice
2004	Around the World in 80 Days	Grizzled Sergeant	
2005	Valiant	Mercury	Voice
2006	Charlotte's Web	Samuel the Sheep	Voice
2006	Man About Town	Dr. Primkin	
2006	L'Entente Cordiale	Lord Conrad	French film
2007	Shrek the Third	Harold	Voice
2008	Igor	Dr. Glickenstein	Voice
2008	The Day the Earth Stood Still	Dr. Karl Barnhardt	
2009	The Pink Panther 2	Chief-Inspector Charles Dreyfus	
2009	Planet 51	Professor Kipple	Voice
2010	Spud	"The Guv" Edly	
2010	Shrek Forever After	Harold	Voice
2011	Beethoven's Christmas Adventure	The Narrator	Voice
2011	The Big Year	Historical Montage Narrator	Voice
2011	Winnie the Pooh	The Narrator	Voice
2012	God Loves Caviar	McCormick	
2012	A Liar's Autobiography	David Frost / Various Roles	Voices
2013	The Last Impresario	Himself	Documentary
2013	The Croods	—N/a	Story credit
2013	Spud 2: The Madness Continues	"The Guv" Edly	
2013	Planes	Bulldog	Voice
2014	Spud 3: Learning to Fly	"The Guv" Edly	
2015	Absolutely Anything	Chief Alien	Voice
2016	Get Squirrely	Mr. Bellwood	Voice
2016	Albion: The Enchanted Stallion	General Eeder	
2016	Trolls	King Gristle Sr.	Voice
2018	Charming	The Fairy Godmother	Voice
2018	Elliot the Littlest Reindeer	Donner	Voice
2019	The Naked Wanderer	Brian King	
2019	Arctic Dogs	Doc Walrus	Voice
2020	The Very Excellent Mr. Dundee	John	
2021	Father Christmas Is Back	John Christmas	
2021	Clifford the Big Red Dog	Mr. Bridwell	
2022	Daddy Daughter Trip	Frank	
2023	Rally Road Racers	Archie Vainglorious	Voice
2023	The Palace	Arthur William Dallas III	
2023	The Martini Shot	Dr. Auyeung	

== Television ==
Year	Title	Role	Notes
1962–1963	That Was the Week That Was	—N/a	Writer
1966–1967	The Frost Report	Various Roles	28 episodes; also writer
1967	At Last the 1948 Show	Various Roles	2 seasons; also writer
1968	How to Irritate People	Various Roles	Television film; also writer
1968	The Avengers	Marcus Rugman	1 episode
1969–1974	Monty Python's Flying Circus	Various Roles	40 episodes; also co-creator and writer
1971, 1974	Sez Les	Various Roles	18 episodes
1972	Monty Python's Fliegender Zirkus	Various Roles	2 episodes; also co-creator and writer
1973	The Goodies	The Genie	Episode: "The Goodies and the Beanstalk"
1973	Comedy Playhouse	Sherlock Holmes	Episode: "Elementary, My Dear Watson"
1975–1979	Fawlty Towers	Basil Fawlty	12 episodes; also co-creator and writer
1977	The Muppet Show	Himself	Episode: "John Cleese"
1979	Ripping Yarns	Passer-By	Episode: "Golden Gordon"
1979	To Norway, Home of Giants	Norman Fearless	Television film
1979	Doctor Who	Art Gallery Visitor	Cameo; City of Death Part 4
1980	The Taming of the Shrew	Petruchio	Television film
1980	The Secret Policeman's Ball	Himself (Host)	Television special
1982	Whoops Apocalypse	Lacrobat	3 episodes
1987	Cheers	Dr. Simon Finch-Royce	Episode: "Simon Says"
1987	The Grand Knockout Tournament	Himself	Television special
1988	True Stories: Peace in our Time?	Neville Chamberlain	Television film
1993	Last of the Summer Wine	Neighbour	Episode: "Welcome to Earth"
1993	Dr. Seuss Video Classics	The Narrator (voice)	Episode: "Did I Ever Tell You How Lucky You Are?"
1998	Monty Python Live at Aspen	Himself	Television special
1998, 2001	3rd Rock from the Sun	Dr. Liam Neesam	4 episodes
1999	Casper & Mandrilaftalen	Various Roles	Episode #2.2
1999–2000	Mickey Mouse Works	The Narrator (voice)	4 episodes
2001	The Human Face	Himself (Host)	4 episodes; also writer
2002	Wednesday 9:30 (8:30 Central)	"Red" Lansing	12 episodes
2003–2004	Will & Grace	Lyle Finster	6 episodes
2004	Wine for the Confused	Himself (host)	Documentary; also writer
2008	Batteries Not Included	Himself (host)	6 episodes
2008	We Are Most Amused	Himself (host)	Television special
2010	Entourage	Himself	Episode: "Lose Yourself"
2012–2013	Whitney	Dr. Grant	2 episodes
2014	Over the Garden Wall	Quincy Endicott / Adelaide (voices)	2 episodes
2018–2019	Hold the Sunset (Note: Previously named Edith)	Phil	13 episodes
2018	Speechless	Martin	2 episodes
2023	The Dinosaur Hour	Himself (host)	8 episodes
2023	LOL: Last One Laughing	Himself	1 episode
2024	The Roast of John Cleese	Himself	Seven Network special

== Theatre ==
Year	Title	Role	Notes
1965	Half a Sixpence	Young Walsingham	Broadway production
2005	Spamalot	God (voice)	
2014	Monty Python Live (Mostly)	Various Roles	Also writer
2017	Bang Bang!	N/A	Writer, adapting Georges Feydeau's Monsieur Chasse!

== Video games ==
Year	Title	Voice role	Notes
1994	Monty Python's Complete Waste of Time	Performer	Video
1996	Monty Python & the Quest for the Holy Grail	Performer	Video
1997	Monty Python's The Meaning of Life	Performer	Video
1998	Starship Titanic	The Bomb	Credited as Kim Bread
2000	007 Racing	R	
2000	007: The World Is Not Enough (Nintendo 64)	R	
2000	007: The World Is Not Enough (PlayStation)	R	
2004	James Bond 007: Everything or Nothing	Q	
2004	Time Troopers	Special Agent Wormold	
2004	Trivial Pursuit: Unhinged	History	
2005	Jade Empire	Sir Roderick Ponce Von Fontlebottom the Magnificent Bastard	
2007	Shrek the Third	King Harold	
2010	Fable III	Jasper	
2012	Smart As	The Narrator	
2014	The Elder Scrolls Online	Sir Cadwell	
2015	The Elder Scrolls Online: Tamriel Unlimited	Sir Cadwell	
2016	The Elder Scrolls Online: Gold Edition	Sir Cadwell	
2016	Payday 2	The Butler (Aldstone)	
2017	Raid: World War II	Control	
2018	The Elder Scrolls Online: Summerset	Sir Cadwell	
2019	The Elder Scrolls Online: Elsweyr	Sir Cadwell	
2020	The Elder Scrolls Online: Greymoor	Sir Cadwell	
2021	The Elder Scrolls Online: Blackwood	Sir Cadwell	

== Radio credits ==
Year	Title
1964–1973	I'm Sorry, I'll Read That Again
1972	I'm Sorry I Haven't a Clue

== Discography ==
Year	Artist	Album	Role
2003	Mike Oldfield	Tubular Bells 2003	Master of Ceremonies

== Audiobooks ==
(list only includes audiobooks in which Cleese is sole reader, not those in which he is part of a cast)

Year	Title
1997	The Inferno of Dante
1999	The Screwtape Letters by C.S. Lewis
2006	Did I Ever Tell You How Lucky You Are? by Dr. Seuss
2012	The Comedy Greats by Russell Davies
2012	Tom Thumb
2016	So, Anyway... autobiography by John Cleese

== Television advertisements ==
Year	Title	Role
1970s	Royal Mail	Pirate / Sir Betty
1975	Texaco	Himself
1978	Accurist	Himself
1980–1982	Sony	Himself
1981	Giroblauw (Netherlands)	Interviewer
1982	Postbank (Netherlands)	Himself
1982	EAC Multilist (Australia)	Estate agent
1982	American Express	Himself
1980s	Compaq	Himself
1980s	Planters Pretzels (Australia)	Himself
1986	Maxwell House	Himself
1988	Talking Pages	Man who wants to marry Princess
1990–1991	Schweppes	Himself
1991–1994	Magnavox	Himself
1992–1993	Talking Pages	Colin
1993	Nestlé Milk Chocolate (Australia)	Himself
1993	Cellnet	Woman
1993–1995	Health Education Authority (Smoking Quitline)	Himself
1996	Norwich Union Direct	Himself
1996	Tele Danmark (Denmark)	Himself
1998	Tostitos	French chef
1998	Lexus	Himself, voice only
1998–1999	Sainsbury's	Himself
1999	Melba toast	Himself
1999	Artistdirect.com	Himself
2001	007: Agent Under Fire	R
2001–2008	Titleist	Ian MacCallister
2002	Little Tikes	Himself
2002	Heineken	Himself
2003	Westinghouse Unplugged vacuum cleaner	Himself
2005	Intel	Himself
2006	TBS	Himself
2006	TV Spielfilm (Germany)	Himself
2006–2008	Kaupþing (Iceland)	Himself
2008	Bank Zachodni WBK (Poland)	Himself
2009	Elgiganten (Sweden)	Himself
2009	Hashahar Ha'oleh (Israel)	Western general
2009	Accurist	Himself
2010	William Hill (Austria)	Himself
2010–2011	AA	Himself
2011	Dogtober (Australia)	Himself, voice only
2012	Czech Olympic Team (Czech Republic)	Himself
2012	DirecTV	Himself
2012	Canadian Club (Australia)	Himself, voice only
2015	Specsavers	Basil Fawlty
