= Alex McGregor (actress) =

South African actress (born 1993)

- Born: Alex Piara McGregor; 7 June 1993 (age 33); Cape Town, South Africa
- Education: University of Cape Town
- Occupation: Actress
- Years active: 2005–present

Alex Piara McGregor (born 7 June 1993) is a South African actress. She began her career as a child actress before gaining prominence through her role as Christine in the Spud films (2010–2014). Her work includes the films Impunity (2014) and Slumber Party Massacre (2021), the BBC docudrama The Gamechangers (2015), and the Syfy series Vagrant Queen (2020).

== Early life ==
McGregor grew up in Sea Point, Cape Town. She has two older sisters Tamara and Lauren, the latter of whom is an actress. McGregor was inspired to act when she watched her sister play Rizzo in a production of Grease and joined her drama rehearsal. Her cousins are the model sisters Kerry and Tracy McGregor. McGregor signed with Storm Models and Artistes Personal Management. She first appeared on screen in a commercial when she was 6, and made her television debut at age 11 in Charlie Jade.

== Personal life ==
In September 2024, McGregor became engaged to her longterm partner Bjorn Steinbach.

== Filmography ==
=== Film ===
Year	Title	Role	Notes
2010	Spud	Christine	Comedy/Drama
2013	Spud 2: The Madness Continues	Christine	Comedy
2013	House Party: Tonight's the Night	Morgan	Comedy
2014	Young Ones	Sooz	Action/Drama/Romance
2014	Sophia Grace and Rosie's Royal Adventure	Not Phyllis Bundt	Direct-to-video
2014	Impunity	Echo	Crime/Thriller
2014	Spud 3: Learning to Fly	Christine	Comedy
2017	The Dark Tower	Susan Delgado	Additional scene
2018	The Sound	Lia	Short film/Horror
2021	Slumber Party Massacre	Breanie	Horror
2024	Invasive	Jessica	Horror
2024	Killer Body Count	Tawny	Comedy/Horror

=== Television ===
Year	Title	Role	Notes
2005	Charlie Jade	Young Gemma	3 episodes
2008	Crusoe	Grace	2 episodes
2012	Infested!	Lauren Girard	Docuseries; episode: "Driven Insane"
2015	The Gamechangers	Bridjet	Television film
2016	Of Kings and Prophets	Sarah	Recurring role; 5 episodes
2016	Cape Town	Yvonne Stoffberg	Miniseries; 3 episodes
2017	Blood Drive	Karma	Recurring role; 4 episodes
2017	The Searchers	Fable Brooks	Pilot
2020	Vagrant Queen	Amae Rali	Main role
2022	Justice Served	Karabo Friedman	Main Role
