= Ben Voss =

South African comedian, actor and satirist

Benjamin Voss
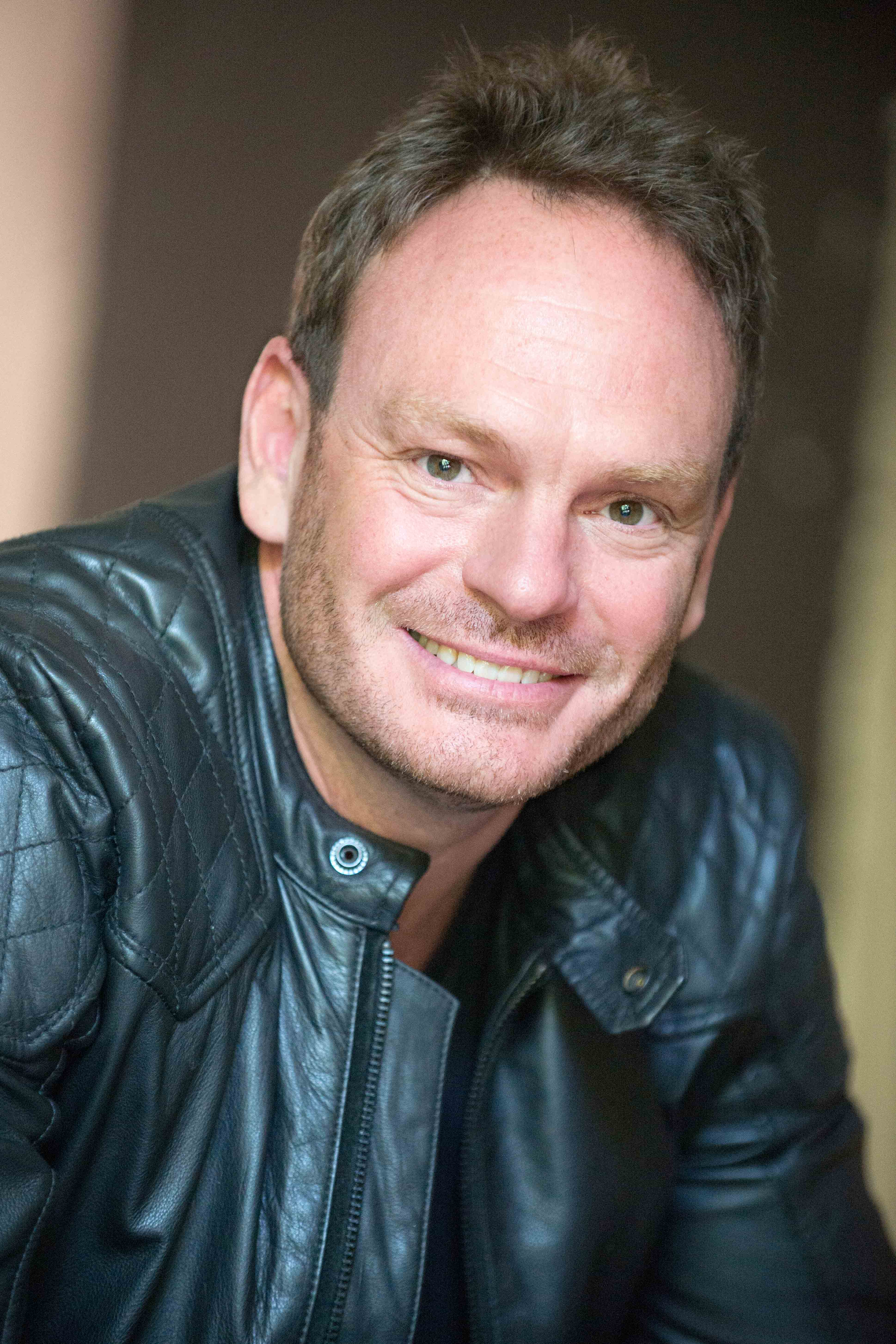
- Ben Voss
- Born: 3 May 1973 (age 53); Rhodesia
- Citizenship: South African
- Education: University of Natal, South Africa
- Known for: Beauty Ramapelepele
- Website: benvoss.co.za

Ben Voss (born 3 May 1973) is a South African comedian, actor and satirist. He has been a professional actor, playwright and producer since 1998. He has also starred in films alongside John Cleese and Troye Sivan and in the TV series Desert Rose on Mnet and Showmax.

== Early life and education ==
He was born in Rhodesia and educated in Natal, South Africa. He completed an honours degree in Mechanical Engineering at the University of Natal. He also has a post-graduate degree in Human Resources from the same institution. After a gap year in South East Asia he returned to Durban, South Africa to take up a post as an engineer in the paper industry.

== Performing arts career ==
In 1998 he gave up engineering and turned to acting. He performed in Shakespeare's Twelfth Night in 2001 and played the title role in Macbeth in 2002. He is a multiple Naledi Award and Fleur du Cap winner and nominee.

=== Stage ===
On stage Voss is primarily a satirist. Together with John van de Ruit (of Spud fame), he produced and performed the comedy skit shows Green Mamba and Black Mamba. Both won many of South Africa's major comedy and theatre awards and played in South Africa, Zimbabwe, Namibia, Botswana, Swaziland, Germany and the United Kingdom, with runs at the Wimbledon Theatre in London.

Voss uses comedy as commentary on life in post-apartheid South Africa. His shows, Beauty and the B.E.E. and Bend it like Beauty (commissioned by the Oval House Theatre in London) played in South Africa and abroad. His run at the Oval House Theatre in London was featured on BBC world news and he was commissioned to perform at events for the South African Soccer World Cup. Voss has also shared the stage with Pieter-Dirk Uys's "Evita" on his DVD release of Elections and Erections.

His one-man show Benny Bushwhacker played throughout southern Africa. In 2018 he played the Evil Queen in the pantomime stage show of Snow White, directed by Janice Honeyman, at the Joburg Theatre. In 2021 he was top billed, as one of the ugly sisters, alongside Desmond Dube in Janice Honeyman's Cinderella. In 2023 he played Captain Hook in the three-month season of Peter Pan. In 2024 he was awarded a star on Joburg Theatre's walk of fame.

=== Film ===
Voss's film credits include the Spud series of movies where Voss plays Mr. Lily, Spud's art teacher and under-14D/E rugby coach, alongside Troye Sivan and John Cleese.

He played the lead in Robert Fraser's Game and the supporting lead in Craig Friemond's drama Beyond the River in 2017.

=== Television ===
In 2022, Voss played a lead role in the MNET and Showmax production of Desert Rose which was released in 63 countries. In 2023 he appeared in the Emmy nominated Reyka -season 2.

== Awards ==
- Naledi Award – Best comedic performance
- Naledi Award – Best South African Script
- FNB Vita award – Best Supporting actor
- FNB Vita award – Best Actor
- Fleur du Cap award – Best Actor
- Three Ovation Awards – National arts festival
