= Kai Luke Brümmer =

South African actor (born 1993)

- Born: 17 February 1993 (age 33); Johannesburg, South Africa
- Other names: Kai Luke Brummer; Kai Brummer
- Education: University of Cape Town
- Occupation: Actor
- Years active: 2015–present

Kai Luke Brümmer (also stylised as Brummer; born 17 February 1993) is a South African actor. He is known for his role as Nicholas van der Swart in the film Moffie (2019). The Guardian named him one of the best new-and-up-comers at the 76th Venice Film Festival. On television, he appeared in the Viaplay series Professionals (2020–2022) and the M-Net series Desert Rose (2022).

== Early life ==
Brümmer was born in Johannesburg to parents Jacques and Natalie, and grew up in Henley on Klip. He was introduced to acting by his mother, who was a drama teacher.

He attended St John's College, Johannesburg. He graduated in 2016 with a Bachelor of Arts in Theatre & Performance with a distinction in Acting from the University of Cape Town.

Brümmer was briefly a ringmaster for the Boswell Wilkie Circus.

== Filmography ==
=== Film ===
Year	Title	Role	Notes
2017	Bring It On: Worldwide Cheersmack	Boy Cheerleader	
2019	Moffie	Nicholas van der Swart	
2020	"Master Harold"...and the Boys	Hally	Recording
2020	The Kissing Booth 2	Buddy	Netflix film
2022	Eraser: Reborn	Deputy Oltcheck	
2024	Touchdown	Pete	

=== Television ===
Year	Title	Role	Notes
2017	Origins: The Journey of Humankind	Soldier	Docudrama; 2 episodes
2018	Deutschland 83	US Army	Episode: "Ommegang"
2020	Vagrant Queen	Various	4 episodes
2020–2022	Professionals	Danny Corbo	Main role
2022	Abraham Lincoln	William Elkin	Episode: "The Railsplitter"
2022	Desert Rose	Eben Greyling	Main role
TBA	Bloodaxe		

== Stage ==
Year	Title	Role	Notes
2014	Mephisto	Sebastian Brückner	The Arena, Cape Town
2015	Trophy		Cape Town Fringe Festival
2017	The Native	Bruce Sifren	
2017	Immortal	The Drifter	Castle of Good Hope, Cape Town
2018	When Swallows Cry		Baxter Theatre Centre, Rondebosch; The Drama Factory, Cape Town
2018	Selwyn and Gabriel	Selwyn	Alexander Bar, Café and Theatre, Cape Town
2018	The Curious Incident of the Dog in the Night-Time	Christopher Boone	Pieter Toerien Theatre, Johannesburg
2020	"Master Harold"...and the Boys	Hally	Fugard Theatre, Cape Town
2024	Moffie	Nicholas van der Swart	Riverside Studios, London

== Awards and nominations ==
Year	Award	Category	Work	Result	Ref.
2018	BWW South Africa Awards	Best Actor in a Featured Role in a Play	Immortal	Nominated	
2019	Fleur du Cap Theatre Awards	Best Performance by a Lead Actor in a Play	The Curious Incident of the Dog in the Night-Time	Nominated	
2019	Naledi Theatre Awards	Best Lead Performance in a Play (Male)	The Curious Incident of the Dog in the Night-Time	Won	
2019	Naledi Theatre Awards	Best Breakthrough Performance	The Curious Incident of the Dog in the Night-Time	Nominated	
2022	CinEuphoria Awards	Best Actor – International	Moffie	Nominated	
2022	CinEuphoria Awards	Best Ensemble – International	Moffie	Nominated	
