= The Umbrella Men =

- Directed by: John Barker
- Written by: John Barker; Lev David; Philip Roberts
- Produced by: John Barker; Dan Jawitz; Thembalethu Mfebe; Joel Phiri; Tshepiso Chikapa Phiri
- Cinematography: Motheo Moeng
- Edited by: Saki Bergh
- Music by: Loukman Adams; Kyle Shepherd
- Production companies: Barking Rat; Known Associates Entertainment
- Release dates: 14 June 2022 (eVOD); 10 September 2022 (TIFF)
- Running time: 117 minutes
- Country: South Africa
- Languages: English; Afrikaans

The Umbrella Men is a 2022 South African crime comedy film directed by John Barker. It was released through eVOD in South Africa on 14 June 2022. It screened at the Toronto International Film Festival (TIFF) that September, where it competed in the Contemporary World Cinema category. It was awarded Best Film at London's Film Africa Fest.

== Cast ==
- Jaques de Silva as Jerome Adams
- Shamilla Miller as Keisha
- Keenan Arrison as Mortimer
- Bronté Snell as Mila
- Abduragman Adams as Tariq Cupido
- Omar Adams as Uncle Percy
- Irshaad Ally as the General
- June van Merch as Aunty Valerie
- Kagiso Lediga as Tendeka
- Joey Yusuf Rasdien as Tiger
- Dann Jaques Mouton as Loukman

== Production ==
John Barker first came up with the concept for The Umbrella Men over 10 years before the film would eventually be made into feature length. Set in Bo-Kaap, principal photography took place on location in Cape Town.

The sequel, The Umbrella Men: Escape From Robben Island in 2024.
