= Tamara Jozi =

South African actress and television personality (1956–2021)

- Born: Tamara Nokulunga Jozi; 12 December 1956; South Africa
- Died: 6 August 2021 (aged 64); South Africa
- Occupations: Actress, Television personality

Tamara Nokulunga Jozi (12 December 1956 – 6 August 2021) was a South African actress and television personality. She is best known for commercial advertisement "the Wimpy", where she keeps asking "Thabo, when are you getting married?".

== Personal life ==
She died on 6 August 2021 at the age of 64 from natural causes.

== Career ==
She was a household name in television, newspapers and billboard advertisements. Apart from appearing in many television commercials, she had a notable role in the soapie Soul City. Then she acted in the short film Secrets and Lies. Then she joined the e.tv soap opera Rhythm City and the SABC1 dramatization serial Society. In 2013, she joined the season 2 of SABC1 serial After 9. Apart from that, she also acted in the serials Gauteng Maboneng, Isibaya, Scandal!, and Lithapo.

Apart from television, she also acted in the feature film The Long Run in 2001 and the short film Die Soldaat in 2014. In 2014, she competed in an episode of the e.tv game show I Love South Africa. Her final television appearance came through the M-Net thriller serial Reyka where she played the role of "Bongi's grandmother".

== Filmography ==
Year	Film	Role	Genre	Ref.
2001	The Long Run	Suiker's Domestic Worker	Film	
2011	Soul City	Tunisia	TV series	
2011	Gauteng Maboneng	Koko	TV series	
2013	After 9		Film	
2013	Isibaya	Mazondi	TV series	
2014	Die Soldaat	Lettie	Short film	
2021	Reyka	Bongi's granny	TV series	
2020	Lithapo	Buhle	TV series	
	Secrets and Lies		Short film	
	Rhythm City		TV series	
	Society	MaGumede	TV series	
	Scandal!	Mam'Joyce	TV series	
