= Quizzical Pictures =

South African production company

- Founded: 1993
- Headquarters: 139 Greenway, Greenside, Randburg, 2034
- Key people: Harriet Gavshon (managing director)
- Products: Film production Television production
- Website: www.quizzical.co.za

Quizzical Pictures, formerly known as Curious Pictures until 2012, is a South African film and television production company based in the Johannesburg area.

The company was originally founded as Weekly Mail Television in 1993 and then Mail & Guardian Television. The company separated from the Mail & Guardian in 1999, becoming Curious Pictures. As to avoid confusion with the American production company of the same name, the company's name changed again in 2012 to Quizzical Pictures. In 2014, the studio moved to a warehouse facility in Randburg.

Dramas, comedies, and reality joints produced by Quizzical have garnered a number of awards and nominations, including at the SAFTAs, Africa Movie Academy Awards, the Rose d'Or, Peabody Award, and International Emmy Awards.

== Productions ==
=== Film ===
Year	Title	Director	Notes
2006	His Big White Self	Nick Broomfield	Documentary
2013	iNumber Number	Donovan Marsh	
2013	Nothing for Mahala	Rolie Nikiwe	
2017	The Lucky Specials	Reabetswe Rangaka	
2017	Beyond the River	Craig Freimond	

=== Television ===
Year	Title	Original network	Notes
1994–2015	Soul City	SABC1	Edutainment
2003–2006	Tsha Tsha	SABC1	
2005–2016	Hard Copy	SABC3	
2006–2009	The Lab	SABC3	
2006	Heartlines	SABC2	Anthology
2007–2021	Rhythm City	e.tv	
2009	Hopeville	SABC2	
2010	A Country Imagined	SABC2	Documentary series
2010–2012	4Play	e.tv	
2010–2012	Class Act	SABC1	Reality
2010–2013	Intersexions	SABC1	
2011–2012	Top Shayela	Vuzu	Reality
2012–present	MasterChef South Africa	M-Net	Reality
2013	Single Guyz	SABC1	
2014	Single Galz	SABC1	
2014	Tropika Island of Treasure	SABC1	Reality; season 6
2014–present	Swartwater	SABC2	
2015	Umlilo	e.tv	
2017	Shuga: Down South	MTV	Season 5
2017	Taryn & Sharon	SABC3	
2018–2019	Diamond City	SABC1	
2019	The Girl from St. Agnes	Showmax	
2020	Lithapo	SABC2	
2020	Shaina	ZBC TV	Television film
2021	Reyka	M-Net	
2022	Desert Rose	M-Net	
2022	Savage Beauty	Netflix	
2022	Paradys		
2024	White Lies	M-Net	
