= Rogue Star Films =

Rogue Star Films is an independent feature film company based in Cape Town, South Africa, owned by Ross Garland.

Rogue Star Films is the producer and distributor of Big Fellas, Confessions of a Gambler, and the film adaptation of the hit South African novel Spud.

== Films ==
- The Story of an African Farm (2004)
- U-Carmen eKhayelitsha (2005)
- Big Fellas (2007)
- Confessions of a Gambler (2008)
- Spud (2010)
- Spud 2: The Madness Continues (2013)
- Spud 3: Learning to Fly (2014)
