= Catching Feelings (film) =

- Theatrical release poster
- Directed by: Kagiso Lediga
- Written by: Kagiso Lediga
- Produced by: Kagiso Lediga; Tamsin Andersson; Ronnie Apteker; Luke Henkeman; Isaac Mogajane; John Volmink
- Starring: Kagiso Lediga; Pearl Thusi; Andrew Buckland; Akin Omotoso; Precious Makgaretsa; Kate Liquorish; Tessa Jubber; Loyiso Gola
- Cinematography: Motheo Moeng
- Edited by: Khulekani Zondi
- Music by: Bokani Dyer
- Production company: Diprente Films
- Distributed by: UIP South Africa; Ster-Kinekor; Netflix (International)
- Release dates: 18 June 2017 (LAFF); 9 March 2018 (South Africa)
- Running time: 124 minutes
- Country: South Africa
- Language: English

Catching Feelings is a 2017 South African romantic drama film written, co-produced and directed by Kagiso Lediga. It stars Lediga, Pearl Thusi, Andrew Buckland, Akin Omotoso, Precious Makgaretsa, Kate Liquorish, Tessa Jubber and Loyiso Gola. The film was released on 9 March 2018, by United International Pictures and Ster-Kinekor. The film was available to stream worldwide on 18 May 2018, by Netflix.

== Plot ==
The film follows the story of an "urbane young academic and his beautiful wife, as their lives get turned upside down when a celebrated and hedonistic older writer moves into their Johannesburg home with them".

== Cast ==
- Kagiso Lediga as Max Matsane
- Pearl Thusi as Samkelo
- Akin Omotoso as Joel
- Precious Makgaretsa as Lazola Yoko
- Andrew Buckland as Heiner Miller
- Zandile Tisani as Kabelo
- Kate Liquorish as Tabitha
- Tyson Cross as Miles
- Tessa Jubber as Nicole
- Loyiso Gola as Zweli

== Production ==
The film was shot in Cape Town and Johannesburg, South Africa, in 2016. It is dedicated to the memory of John Volmink, a South African filmmaker who died in 2017.

== Release ==
The film premiered at the 2017 Los Angeles Film Festival on 18 June 2017. The film was released on 9 March 2018 in South Africa. On 18 May 2018, the film was available to stream worldwide on Netflix.

== Reception ==
The film has received favorable reviews from critics. On the review aggregator website, Rotten Tomatoes, the film holds an approval rating of 100% based on 7 reviews, with a weighted average of 7.25/10.

Film critic Phumlani S. Langa of City Press South Africa gave the film four stars out of five, saying "Lediga and Thusi both deliver solid performances in this classy and stylish production. This is probably my favourite Thusi pic. [It] plays a little like a personal classic, [Woody Allen's] Midnight in Paris, without the fantasy aspect. Honestly, it's local and lekker."
