= Reyka (TV series) =

South African crime thriller television series

- Also known as: The Cane Field Killings
- Created by: Rohan Dickson
- Starring: Kim Engelbrecht; Iain Glen
- Country of origin: South Africa
- Original language: English
- No. of seasons: 1
- No. of episodes: 8

Production
- Executive producers: Rohan Dickson; Serena Cullen; Harriet Gavshon; Julie Hodge; Yolisa Phahle; Jan du Plessis
- Producers: Serena Cullen; Harriet Gavshon
- Running time: 47–52 minutes
- Production companies: Quizzical Pictures; Serena Cullen Productions

Original release
- Network: M-Net
- Release: 25 July 2021 – present

Reyka, released as The Cane Field Killings in some countries, is a South African crime thriller television series created and written by Rohan Dickson. It is an M-Net original production co-produced by Quizzical Pictures and Serena Cullen Productions for subscription television channel M-Net, released in July 2021. Reyka was also co-produced for international distribution by Fremantle.

The series received eight nominations at the 2022 South African Film and Television Awards, winning four, including Best Actress in a TV Drama for Kim Engelbrecht. It also received two 2022 International Emmy Award nominations for Best Drama and Best Performance by an Actress.

Reyka was renewed for a second season by M-Net in November 2022.

== Overview ==
The series alternates between Reyka's past and present. In 1994, when apartheid was ending, a 12-year old Reyka was abducted by Angus Speelman, who sexually assaulted her for four years. Reyka managed to escape at age 16, with her abductor finally caught and sentenced to prison.

Now as an adult, Reyka (Kim Engelbrecht), is a criminal profiler investigating a string of brutal murders in Kwa-Zulu Natal by a serial killer. She deals with her traumatic childhood, which somehow also helps her get into the minds of Africa's notorious criminals.

== Cast ==
- Kim Engelbrecht as Reyka Gama, an investigative psychologist and criminal profiler. She was abducted in her childhood.
- Gabrielle de Gama as Young Reyka
- Iain Glen as Angus Speelman, Scottish immigrant farmer. He and his wife abduct small children, on account of not being able to have their own. When the children reach a certain age, Speelman sees them as sexual beings.
- Nokuthula Ledwaba as Portia, Angus's wife. Mired in a complicated and dangerous relationship with him, her past is a mystery.
- Anna-Mart van der Merwe as Elsa Meyer, a journalist and adventure seeker. She is Reyka's mother. Reyka carries resentment, knowing that at some point, she gave up in searching for her, however they both work together to build a new relationship with each other.
- Hamilton Dlamini as Hector Zwane, a brigadier who is doggedly determined.
- Gerald Steyn as Tanner
- Mavuso Simelane as Samuel Zwane is a junior detective in the SAPS. He is proud, strong, and ambitious, a straight shooter determined to do everything by the book.
- Tamara Jozi as Bongi's granny
- Leeanda Reddy as Sewsunker, a forensic detective. She is the voice of reason in her team, always calm and methodical in her approach to her work.
- Thando Thabethe as Constable Nandi Cele. She is forthright and empathetic, acting as a moral compass for her colleagues.
- Desmond Dube as Pastor Ezekiel, a spiritual leader in his community. He is a showman and a seductive orator who uses his "gift of the gab" to attract people to his church.
- Kenneth Nkosi as Chief Msomi

== Episodes ==
No.	Title	Directed by	Written by	Original release date
1	"Episode 1"	Zee Ntuli	Rohan Dickson	25 July 2021
2	"Episode 2"	Unknown	Unknown	1 August 2021
3	"Episode 3"	Unknown	Unknown	8 August 2021
4	"Episode 4"	Unknown	Unknown	15 August 2021
5	"Episode 5"	Unknown	Unknown	22 August 2021
6	"Episode 6"	Unknown	Unknown	29 August 2021
7	"Episode 7"	Unknown	Unknown	5 September 2021
8	"Episode 8"	Unknown	Unknown	12 September 2021

== Production ==
It was announced in 2018 that M-Net and Fremantle would work together in creating the series. It was set to start production in early-2019.

On 9 December 2020, Kim Engelbrecht posted pictures of behind-the-scenes footage on Instagram, expressing her excitement for working on the set alongside Iain Glen.

In an interview with Independent Online, Managing director of Quizzical Pictures, Harriet Gavshon, says when she was approached by Rohan Dickson for the series, she was happy to share the production credits with Serena Cullen. She says “I read the outlines and loved it. Then we met the British producer, Serena Cullen, and we got on very well".

On 15 December 2020, M-Net and Fremantle announced the lead cast for the series.

Filming began on the taking place for 7 weeks, predominantly in the rural settlements of Stanger and Inanda, as well as in Johannesburg.

== Broadcast ==
The series premiered on 25 July 2021 on M-Net. The series had an international release via BritBox.

== Reception ==
=== Critical response ===
The first episode of Reyka was shown at the 60th Monte-Carlo Television Festival and received rave reviews.

South African reporter, Thinus Ferreira for News24, gave the series a rating of 3/5, comparing it to Prodigal Son and The Silence of the Lambs. He says the script by Rohan Dickson may likely be inspired by South African serial killer Thozamile Taki, known as the Sugarcane Killer. Thozamile was convicted with 19 life sentences on 19 January 2011 for the murders of 13 young women, 10 of whom were murdered in the sugarcane fields around Umzinto in 2007. He warns "some on-screen gruesomeness is par for the cause in a catch-the-killer crime drama. Reyka is possibly best watched with the lights on, and on bright, on a Sunday night".

=== Awards and nominations ===
Year	Award	Category	Nominee(s)	Result	Ref.
2022	South African Film and Television Awards	Best TV Drama	Reyka	Nominated	
2022	South African Film and Television Awards	Best Actress in a TV Drama	Kim Engelbrecht	Won	
2022	South African Film and Television Awards	Best Actor in a TV Drama	Hamilton Dlamini	Nominated	
2022	South African Film and Television Awards	Best Achievement in Scriptwriting – TV Drama	Rohan Dickson	Won	
2022	South African Film and Television Awards	Best Achievement in Directing – TV Drama	Catharine Cooke, Zwelesizwe Ntuli	Won	
2022	South African Film and Television Awards	Best Achievement in Editing – TV Drama	Melanie Sara Golden, Matthew Dylan Swanepoel	Nominated	
2022	South African Film and Television Awards	Best Achievement in Cinematography – TV Drama	Tom Marais	Won	
2022	South African Film and Television Awards	Best Achievement in Make-up and Hairstyling – TV Drama	Theola Booyens	Nominated	
2022	International Emmy Awards	Best Drama Series	Reyka	Nominated	
2022	International Emmy Awards	Best Actress	Kim Engelbrecht	Nominated	
