= The Middle Children =

The Middle Children is a collection of fourteen short stories written by South African writer Rayda Jacobs, based mostly on her experience living under apartheid and published in Canada in 1994. Through these short stories the reader learns about apartheid, exile, and living as a black person who can pass as white (referred to as middle children), as well as the struggles that come with it, through the main character's eyes.

== Plot ==
Many of the short stories in The Middle Children follow Sabah, who is mixed race, through various life experiences before and after her banishment to Canada. Not all the stories in this collection feature Sabah, but all the stories are centred around South African people and their lives as they experience racism and other hardships during apartheid. There are fourteen stories in total. The first story of the collection is also called The Middle Children and it describes the moment where Sabah, the focus of the stories, is discovered possessing a white card and is called into the criminal investigation office where she is told she will not be arrested alongside her card provider if she moves to Canada . Her father who is also a lawyer comes to defend her. It is revealed while her father is negotiating with the police that the only reason she obtained the white card was to get an education she otherwise would not have access to.

The Doekoem, Madula, and Masquerade, are all stories from Sabah's childhood in South Africa. Madula is centered around a moment in her childhood where her Paternal grandfather is setting up a traditional Muslim sacrifice of a cow in her backyard. She and other children are waiting in the barn on the property when one of the children claim that she is not really related to her grandfather because her grandfather is very dark and her father appears white. Sabah takes this very personally and gets into a fight with this girl. The Doekoem is centered around Sabah's experience growing up in her grandparents’ house. A woman named Patty who was always having problems with keeping the man she wants comes to get advice from Sabah's Grandmother. She goes along with them to visit a Wiseman called The Doekom who lives in a rundown house that doesn’t even have a bathroom. Masquerade is split up into two parts the first part is her describing her Grandfathers death and seeing his body as they cleaned it in the morgue and the second part describing an incident she had at a place called the Caliphas house where it is implied that she is going to have some sort of vaginal exam before she runs out.

Billie Can’t Poo, Don’t Mention it, and Make the Chicken Run are stories that feature Sabah after she has moved to Canada. Billie Can’t Poo is one of the more humorous stories told from the perspective of Sabah's Canadian friend Billie on a month-long visit to South Africa. She becomes constipated upon her arrival to South Africa. Sabah reveals this embarrassing fact to members of her family who all give her remedies. She finally goes at the worst moment when they are trapped on a narrow road on a mountain. She has inexplicable hysterics on the plane ride home from South Africa. In Don’t Mention It is about Sabah's mother on her first visit to Canada. Sabah is divorced from her husband at this point but cannot move back home because of her children. Her mother stays for two months and her visit impacts Sabah's children by getting to know a part of their ancestry. One instance when they go to a bulk store their grandmother steals a couple chocolate covered almonds. Sabah exclaims that she had always been told that stealing was wrong. Her mother however, sees it as sampling to buy them next time. This visit impacts Sabah's daughter the most as it allows her to see her mother in a different light after learning about her past. Make the Chicken Run is the fourteenth story and features an inner monologue from Sabah before she votes in Canada; she reflects on how her life has changed.

All the other short stories that don’t feature Sabah are stand-alone stories. The Starlights describes a group of men and their brief encounter with racism from a police officer . I Count the Bullets Sometimes follows the story of presumably wealthy black family the son, Nazeem who makes a white friend at the private school he goes to. He's family is at first polite with a noticeable tension only eased when the family realizes that Jeremy despite being white is less privileged than them in some ways. Boundaries features three sisters, the youngest of which passes for white. This story highlights jealousy and favouritism that can happen when the family has a passing child. This jealousy leads to the death of a man and an unknown fate for the youngest sister, who is still in a coma at the end of the story.

== Characters ==
- Sabah – A coloured South Afrikaner who is forced to move to Canada for having a white card. We read multiple stories from her childhood to her young adulthood until she is grown with children of her own. Through Sabah's perspective we learn about her specific experience of living in South Africa as a coloured person who passes for white.
- Billie – Sabah's friend from Canada. Experiences South Africa for the first time when she visits with Sabah.
- Mrs. Dollie – Sabah's mother. An eccentric woman. She's used to being poor so she hoards many things such as bits of food and used teabags.
- Mr. Solomon – Sabah's father. Lawyer.
- Riaaz – Sabah's brother
- Mrs. Abrahm's – Sabah's maternal grandmother
- Grandpa Doels- Sabah's Paternal Grandfather. He was Muslim. Had a close relationship with Sabah. Generous and selfless man always trying to help people out by giving them jobs.
- The Levy family – Nazeem(son), Ruby(daughter), Layla(daughter), Soraya(daughter), Mr & Mrs Levy. A well off coloured family in Cape town.
- Jeremy Vosloo- a young, white private school boy, friend of Nazeem. Although he is white in a racially divided country that values white people he is poor. His father is dead and his mother is not present in his life.
- Miles- Sabah's husband whom she meets in Canada. Sabah later divorces him.
- Rose- The eldest of three sisters from the short story Boundaries. Married at 18 years old, she is a housewife who enjoys taking her children to bible class
- Erica- The middle sister from Boundaries; she has not settled down with anybody and teaches school children as her profession. She was seeing a man named Lionel and hoped to marry him. Erica eventually hired a hitman after Lionel had an affair with Sandra. In a previous incident, Erica also poked holes in Sandra's condoms.
- Sandra- The youngest sister from Boundaries born with fair skin that allowed her to pass for white. Her skin, violet eyes, and silver hair made her the star of the family and she received special treatment from all her relatives. She grew up to be an attorney, causing more jealousy from her sister Erica. Sandra briefly dated Lionel before leaving him for somebody else, but became his mistress again after he started dating her sister Erica. This was not the first time she dated the same man as Erica. She remains in a coma throughout Boundaries, suffering from a traumatic brain injury at the hands of a hitman hired by Erica.
- Lionel- Lionel appears in Boundaries as a graduated archaeologist who briefly dated Sandra while in university. A year after Sandra dumped him, he began dating Erica instead. Upon seeing Sandra for the first time since their breakup he briefly asks about her life but leaves with Erica. The next day he invites Sandra over and the affair begins. Erica becomes aware of Lionel's affair on day one; ultimately Lionel is murdered by a hitman.

== Themes ==
=== Racism ===
The Middle Children has a central focus around the division between Black people and White people caused by apartheid. Attached to the theme of racism is the identity crisis faced by South Africa's mixed-race citizens, who can sometimes pass for white; this leads to its own set of problems including jealousy. Had there been no racism in South Africa Sabah would not needed the white card which got her arrested. The first story of the collection, also titled The Middle Children discusses the privileges that come with being white passing, such as being able to go to university or allowed to sit at the front of the train. This story also expresses the fear that comes with being caught pretending to be white.

=== Home ===
Jacobs revealed in an interview with Daniel W. Lehman that the polarities between home and exile was one of the themes of The Middle Children. Home is a major feature of The Middle Children as most of the stories are Sabah reflecting on home in South Africa, making a new home in Canada, or returning home to South Africa for a visit.

=== Family ===
In the same interview, Jacobs discusses her own family life and it is revealed that the short story in The Middle Children titled Masquerade (also the title of Jacobs’ personal memoir) was based on the relationships she shared with her grandparents. Strong family bonds are also shown in Billie Can’t Poo and Don’t Mention It, but family jealousy comes out in Boundaries and well as when Sabah shares that it was somebody in her own family who reported her white card.

== Reviews ==
The reviews on this collection are sparse however those that do exist praise Rayda Jacobs for her prose as well as the message of her stories. It is regarded as a valuable resource on the lived experiences of South African people particularly surrounding the issues of race and The Apartheid.
