= Impunity (film) =

2014 film

- Film poster
- Directed by: Jyoti Mistry
- Written by: Jyoti Mistry; Trish Malone
- Starring: Francis Chouler
- Release date: 6 September 2014 (TIFF)
- Running time: 85 minutes
- Country: South Africa
- Language: English

Impunity is a 2014 South African thriller film directed by Jyoti Mistry about a special investigator and a local detective who find themselves knee-deep in political corruption and conspiracy, while investigating the gruesome murder of a cabinet minister's daughter. It was screened in the Contemporary World Cinema section at the 2014 Toronto International Film Festival.

== Cast ==
- Vaneshran Arumugam
- Francis Chouler as Michael Kelly
- Desmond Dube
- Alex McGregor
- Bjorn Steinbach
