= Pearl Thusi =

South African actress (born 1988)

- Born: Sithembile Xola Pearl Thusi; 13 May 1988 (age 38); Kwa-Ndengezi, Kwazulu-Natal, South Africa
- Education: Pinetown Girls' High School University of the Witwatersrand
- Occupations: Actress; model; radio personality; television host; businesswoman
- Years active: 2003–present
- Known for: Queen Sono; Quantico; Bulletproof; Fistful of Vengeance; The No. 1 Ladies' Detective Agency
- Children: 2
- Website: www.pearlthusiofficial.com

Sithembile Xola Pearl Thusi (born 13 May 1988) is a South African actress, model, and presenter. She is known for her roles as Patricia Kopong in the BBC/HBO comedy-drama series The No. 1 Ladies' Detective Agency, Dayana Mampasi in the ABC thriller Quantico and Samkelo in the romance film Catching Feelings. In 2020, she starred in the title role of Netflix's first African original series, Queen Sono.

== Early life and education ==
Thusi is from townships of KwaNdengezi and Hammarsdale just outside Durban. She has two sisters. She attended Pinetown Girls' High School. She began her studies at the University of the Witwatersrand, but pulled out to make time for her career. In 2020, she resumed studies at the University of South Africa.

== Family and relationship ==
Thusi has two daughters. Her first daughter, Thando Mokwena, who is her biological daughter and an adopted child called Okuhlekonke Thusi.

== Career ==
Thusi is the host of Lip Sync Battle Africa on MTV and e.tv, as well as the talk show Moments, on EbonyLife TV. She has starred on the SABC 3 soap opera Isidingo, as Palesa Motaung, co-hosted Live Amp with DJ Warras and Luthando Shosha, and the SABC 1 celebrity gossip magazine show Real Goboza.

In 2009, Thusi starred as Patricia Kopong on the BBC/HBO comedy-drama The No. 1 Ladies' Detective Agency.

In 2015, Thusi co-starred as Dr. Nandi Montabu in Tremors 5: Bloodlines. She also appeared in a music video entitled "Pearl Thusi" by rapper Emtee.

In 2016, Thusi was cast as a series regular in the role of Dayana Mampasi on the second season of the ABC thriller series Quantico, opposite Priyanka Chopra. In the same year, Thusi was cast as Samkelo in the romantic drama film Catching Feelings. The film was released in theaters on 9 March 2018.

In 2017, Thusi starred as Brenda Riviera in the drama film Kalushi.

In 2018, Thusi became the new host of the third season of MTV Base's Behind the Story. In the same year, Thusi was cast in the lead role of Queen Sono on the Netflix crime drama series Queen Sono. The series premiered on 28 February 2020 and was widely acclaimed by critics, and Thusi's performance in particular was singled out for praise. In April 2020, the series was renewed by Netflix for a second season. However, on 26 November 2020, it was reported that Netflix has cancelled the series because of the production challenges brought on by the COVID-19 pandemic. On 15 December 2020, She became a co-host of 1st KZN Entertainment Awards alongside Somizi Mhlongo.

In February 2021, Thusi was cast as Zama Zulu in the Netflix film Fistful of Vengeance. It was released on 17 February 2022.

== Filmography ==
=== Film ===
Year	Title	Role
2015	Tremors 5: Bloodlines	Dr. Nandi Montabu
2015	Einfach Rosa: Wolken über Kapstadt	Nandi
2017	Catching Feelings	Samkelo
2017	Kalushi: The Story of Solomon Mahlangu	Brenda Riviera
2018	The Scorpion King: Book of Souls	Tala
2020	Bulletproof 2	Joanna "Jo" Schmidt
2022	Fistful of Vengeance	Zama Zulu

=== Television ===
Year	Title	Role
2009	The No. 1 Ladies' Detective Agency	Patricia Kopong
2011-2012	Zone 14	Samkelisiwe
2011–2016	Live Amp	Co-host
2012	Real Goboza	Co-host
2013	Isidingo	Palesa Motaung
2013	Tropika Island of Treasure	Host
2015	Moments	Co-host
2016–2017	Lip Sync Battle Africa	Co-host
2016–2017	Quantico	Dayana Mampasi
2018–present	Behind the Story	Host
2020	Queen Sono	Queen Sono
2020	1st KZN Entertainment Awards	Co-host
2023	Kizazi Moto: Generation Fire	Maadi (voice)
2024- Present	The Real Black Pearl	Herself/Reality Show
