= John van de Ruit =

South African actor and writer (born 1975)

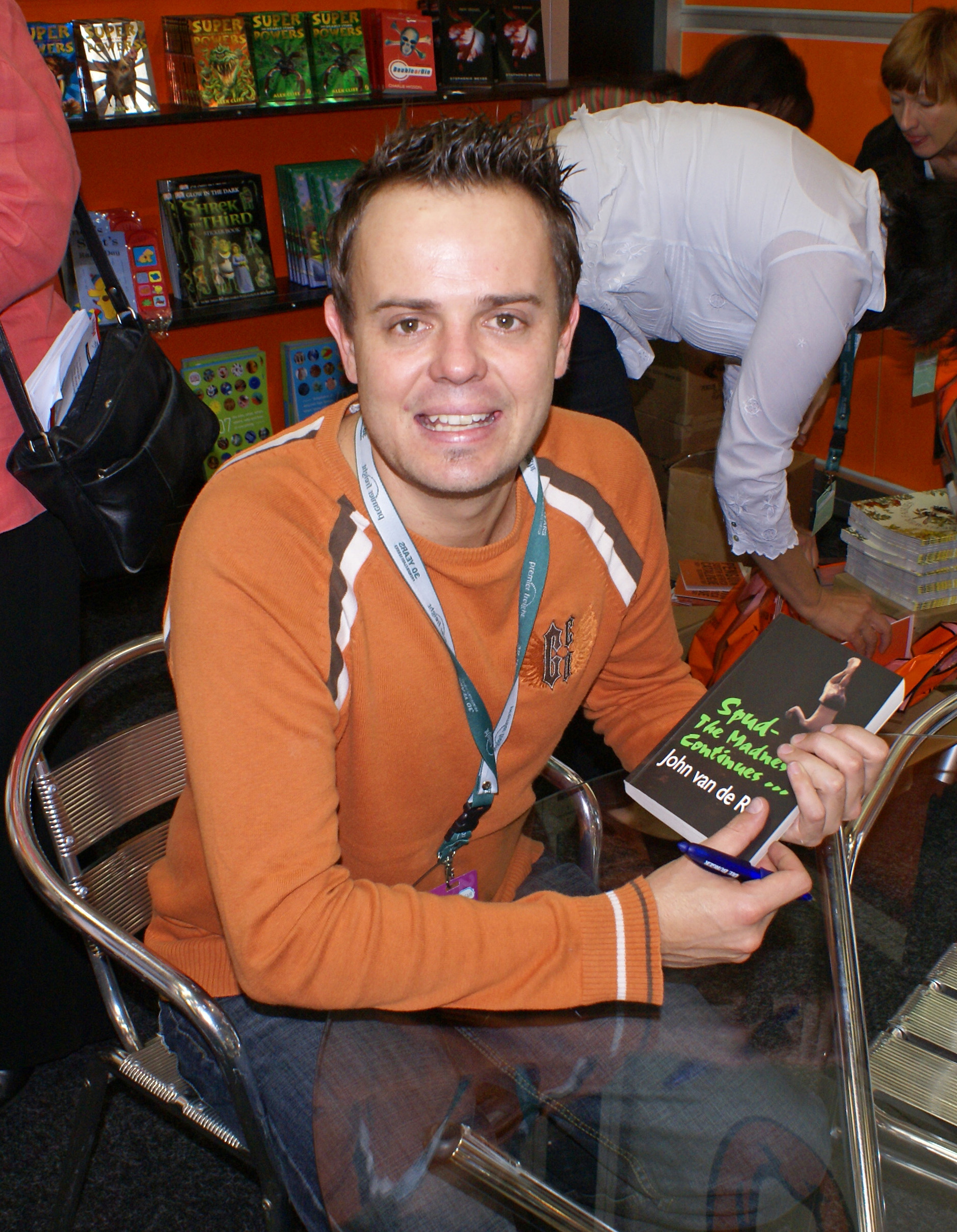
- van de Ruit in 2007, holding his book, Spud - The Madness Continues
- Born: John Howard van de Ruit; 20 April 1975 (age 51); Durban, KwaZulu-Natal, South Africa
- Other name: Howard
- Citizenship: South Africa
- Education: Masters Degree in Arts
- Occupations: Writer, playwright, author, actor
- Years active: 2005-(as a writer)
- Known for: Spud series, Green Mamba(Play)

John Howard van de Ruit (born 20 April 1975) is a South African novelist, actor, playwright and producer. He has been a professional actor, phere he stayed in Founders House and from where he matriculated in 1993. He then went on to complete a master's degree in Drama and Performance at the then University of Natal.

He is best known for his collaboration with Ben Voss on the satirical sketch show Green Mamba which has toured extensively throughout Southern Africa since 2002. His first novel was published in 2005 by Penguin, entitled Spud. The book was a runaway success in South Africa. It won the 2006 Bookseller's Choice Award. The sequel Spud - The Madness Continues... was released in mid-2007. The third book Spud - Learning to Fly was released on 10 June 2009. The first book Spud has also been recorded as an audio book, read by the author. The 4th book Spud: Exit, Pursued by a Bear was released in 2012 on the 4th of August.

Following the sale of the rights to film producer Ross Garland, the film Spud - the Movie was shot between March and April 2010, and released on 3 December 2010. Van der Ruit portrays the teacher, Mr Lennox, in a cameo role.
