= Jyoti Mistry =

South African film director

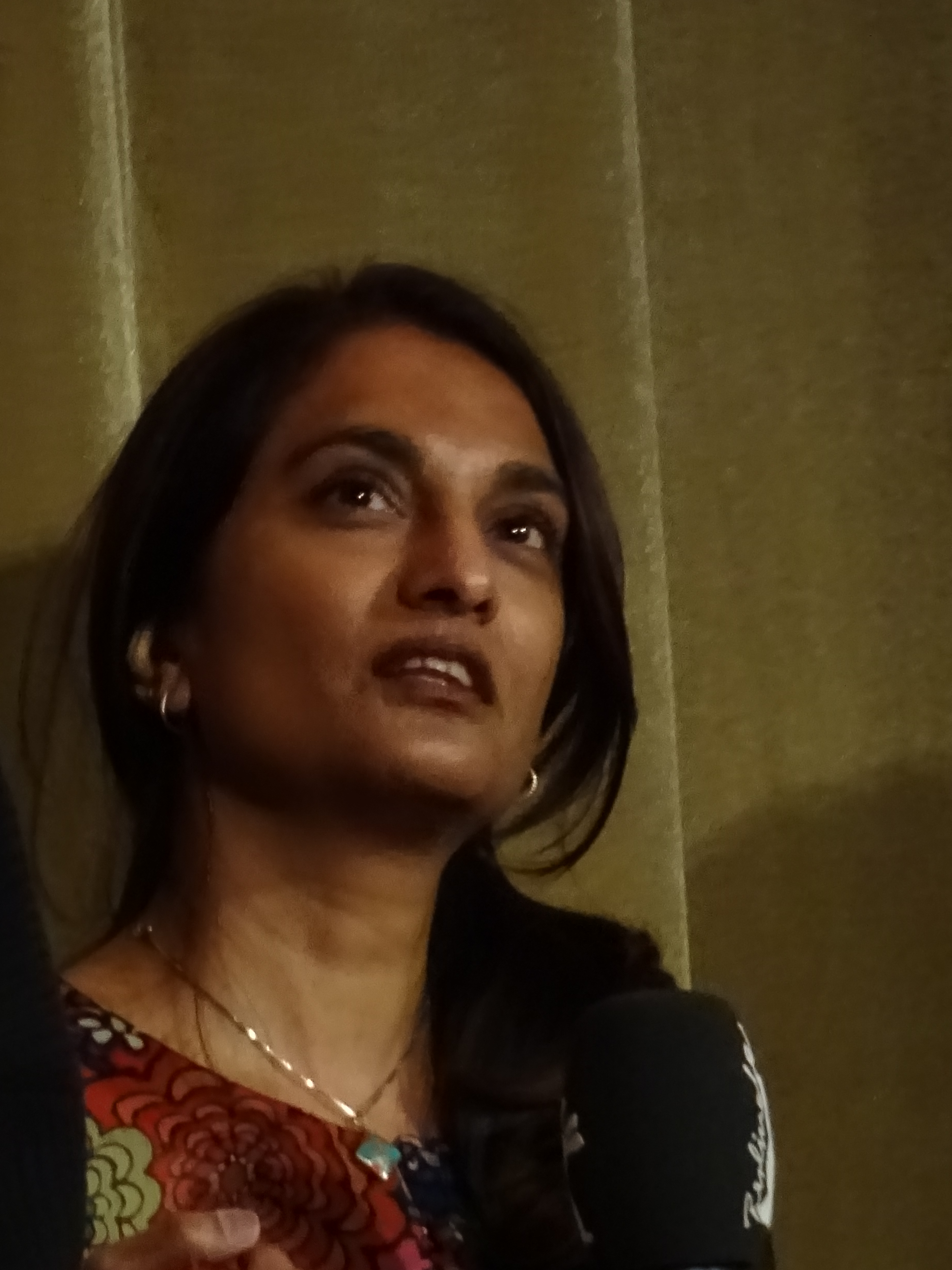
- Mistry in 2020
- Born: 1970 (age 55–56); Durban, South Africa
- Education: University of the Witwatersrand, Honours degree in Comparative Literature; New York University, Masters in Cinema Studies with a Certificate in Culture and Media; PhD in Cinema Studies
- Known for: film directing, installation art and scholarly writing/teaching
- Awards: Association of International Film Schools Teaching Award (2016)

Jyoti Mistry (born 1970) is a South African film director, installation artist, teacher and scholar of Indian ancestry. Her films explore the complexity of racial identity, multiculturalism and gender in modern South Africa through a decolonised lens.

== Biography ==
Mistry was born in Durban, South Africa in 1970.

She achieved a degree in Comparative Literature at the University of the Witwatersrand in South Africa and holds MA and PhD degrees in Cinema Studies from New York University in the United States.

Mistry has been artist in residence at the Netherlands Film Academy in Amsterdam, Netherlands; the California College of the Arts in San Francisco, US; and the Sune Jonsson Centre for documentary photography at the Västerbottens Museum, Sweden. Her works have featured in international exhibitions and galleries including in the AFROPOLIS exhibition, Cologne, Germany; at the Museum der Moderne, Salzburg, Germany; at the Kunsthalle, Wien, Austria; and at the Galerie Nationale du Jeu de Paume, Paris, France.

Her films have premiered at international film festivals, including Toronto, Winterthur, Rotterdam and Durban. She had won awards for her filmmaking at the Hamburg International Short Film Festival and at the Ann Arbor Film Festival, as well as being a member of the Official Competition jury at the 42nd Göthenburg International Film Festival (GIFF) in 2019.

Mistry edited the "Film as Research Tool: Practice and Pedagogy" special issue of the Journal of African Cinema (2018) and with Lizelle Bisschoff was a guest editor of the "decolonising film education" special issue of the Film Education Journal (2022). She has contributed articles to the International Journal of Film and Media Arts and has written film reviews for The Criterion Collection and Eurozine. She has also written on the politics and economics of "Nollywood" and co-edited with Antje Schuhmann the collection of essays Gaze Regimes: Film and Feminisms in Africa (2015).

Mistry has taught at the University of the Witwatersrand, Johannesburg, South Africa; New York University, US; the University of Vienna, Austria; Arcada University of Applied Science in Helsinki. Findland; and at the ALLE Arts School at the University of Addis Ababa, Ethiopia. She was awarded the Association of International Film Schools Teaching Award in 2016.

From 2017 to 2020 she was the principal researcher on the BRICS (Brazil, Russia, India, China, South Africa) cross cultural research project that explored image-making. In 2023, her short film Cause of Death (2020) was screened at an event titled "Science, Body, Anatomy" at the Tate Modern in London.

As of 2025, Mistry is Professor in film at the Valand Academy of the University of Gothenburg, Sweden, and is the editor in chief of the Platform of Artistic Research in Sweden (PARSE).

== Filmography ==
- Yoni (1997)
- We Remember Differently (2005)
- I Mike What I Like (2006), a spoken word film based on a screenplay
- Le loeuf sur le toit (2010), premiered at the Durban International Film Festival
- 09:21:25 (2011)
- Impunity (2014)
- When I Grow Up I Want to Be a Black Man (2017)
- Cause of Death (2020), premiered at the Berlinale International Film Festival and was awarded Best International Short Film at the Hamburg International Short Film Festival and the Austrian Short Film Award
- Loving in Between (2023), was awarded the No. 1 African Film Award at the Ann Arbor Film Festival
