= Desert Rose (TV series) =

South African television series

- Directed by: Cindy Lee
- Opening theme: "Desert Rose" by Neil Sandilands, Tracey-Lee Oliver
- Country of origin: South Africa
- Original language: English
- No. of seasons: 1
- No. of episodes: 8

Production
- Executive producers: Rohan Dickson; Harriet Gavshon; Neil Sandilands
- Producer: JP Potgieter
- Cinematography: Devin Toselli
- Editor: Natalie Varoy
- Running time: 45–60 minutes
- Production company: Quizzical Pictures

Original release
- Network: M-Net
- Release: 2 June – 21 July 2022

Desert Rose is a South African crime thriller television series developed by Quizzical Pictures. Distributed by MultiChoice, the series premiered on M-Net on 2 June 2022.

== Cast ==
- Neil Sandilands as Freddy Greyling
- Kai Luke Brümmer as Eben Greyling
- Tinarie van Wyk-Loots as Rosie Greyling
- Brendon Daniels as Piet Panga
- Amalia Uys as Jana Greyling
- Christia Visser as Ishara Greyling
- Inge Beckmann as Ilse Greyling
- Craig Urbani as Bill Thorne
- Tarryn Lamb as Layla Williams
- Roeline Daneel as Suzanne van As
- Danny Ross as Hugo Heinz
- Daniah de Villiers as Lucy Greyling
- Ben Voss as Eugene van As
- Tracey-Lee Oliver as Ella Vaalbooi
- Melt Sieberhagen as Bertus van Rooyen
- David Viviers as Johnny Kritzinger
- Candice van Litsenborgh as Esme Smit

== Episodes ==
No.	Title	Directed by	Written by	Original release date
1	"Episode 1"	Cindy Lee	Unknown	2 June 2022
2	"Episode 2"	Cindy Lee	Unknown	9 June 2022
3	"Episode 3"	Cindy Lee	Unknown	16 June 2022
4	"Episode 4"	Cindy Lee	Unknown	23 June 2022
5	"Episode 5"	Cindy Lee	Unknown	30 June 2022
6	"Episode 6"	Cindy Lee	Unknown	7 July 2022
7	"Episode 7"	Cindy Lee	Unknown	14 July 2022
8	"Episode 8"	Cindy Lee	Unknown	21 July 2022

== Production ==
The series was first announced in August 2021, with Rohan Dickson attached as show runner and Cindy Lee attached as director. The announced cast were Neil Sandilands, Tinarie van Wyk-Loots, Kai Luke Brümmer, Amalia Uys, Christia Visser, Brendon Daniels, Inge Beckmann, Craig Urbani, Tarryn Lamb, Roeline Daneel, and Danny Ross. Other cast members include Daniah de Villiers, Ben Voss, Tracey-Lee Oliver, Melt Sieberhagen, Candice van Litsenborgh and David Viviers.
