= Adriyan Rae =

American actress

- Born: October 7, 1994 (age 32); Seaford, Delaware, U.S.
- Education: University of the Sciences
- Occupation: Actress
- Years active: 2015–present
- Known for: Vagrant Queen; Chicago Fire
- Children: 1

Adriyan Rae is an American actress known for her role as Elida in the short-lived Syfy drama Vagrant Queen and as Gianna Mackey in the NBC drama Chicago Fire.

== Early life and education ==
Rae was born on October 7, 1994, in Seaford, Delaware and raised by her single mother; she is of Black American, German, Native American, and Venezuelan descent. She was part of a AAU Junior Olympic Games team in track and field and field hockey. She graduated from the University of the Sciences in Philadelphia with degrees in physician assistant studies and medical laboratory science; she has also obtained a professional certification in the latter field.

== Career ==
After moving to Atlanta, Rae began her acting career, appearing in a number of television series since 2016. In 2019, she was cast in the leading role of Elida in the SyFy science fiction drama Vagrant Queen, which ran from March 27, to June 4, 2020.

In 2020, Rae began co-starring in the NBC drama Chicago Fire as Gianna Mackey, the new paramedic on Ambulance 61. She left the series after nine episodes due to undisclosed private reasons.

== Filmography ==
=== Film ===
Year	Title	Role	Notes	Ref.
2017	Burning Sands	Candy		
2018	Superfly	Candice Simmons		

=== Television ===
Year(s)	Title	Role	Notes	Ref.
2015	Fatal Attraction	Sunday Proctor's Friend	1 episode	
2015	The Real Housewives of Atlanta	Herself	Brief appearance; Episode: "Housewife Interrupted"	
2018, 2022	Atlanta	Candice	Guest appearance (season 2 and 3); 2 episodes	
2018	Star	Tammi	Episode: "After the Set, It's the Afterparty"	
2018	Brockmire	Yvonne	3 episodes (uncredited in two)	
2019	American Soul	Pearl Madigan	Episode: "68 B.C."	
2019	Light as a Feather	Peri Boudreaux	Main cast (season 2); 15 episodes	
2020	Vagrant Queen	Elida	Lead role; 10 episodes	
2020–2021	Chicago Fire	Gianna Mackey	Main cast (season 9); 9 episodes	
2021–2023	The Game	Brittany Pitts	Main cast	
2024–2025	Poppa's House	Lola	2 episodes	
2025–	Forever	Brittany (Keisha's cousin)	Recurring cast; 6 episodes	

=== Video games ===
Year	Title	Role	Notes	Ref.
2025	South of Midnight	Hazel	Voice and performance capture	
