= Kim Engelbrecht =

South African actress

- Born: Kim Suzanne Engelbrecht; 20 June 1980 (age 46); Cape Town, South Africa
- Citizenship: South African
- Years active: 1994–present
- Notable work: Eye in the Sky; Dominion
- Awards: 2010 South African Film and Television Awards for Best Supporting Actress

Kim Suzanne Engelbrecht (born 20 June 1980) is a South African actress best known for her roles as Lolly in Isidingo, Sgt. Noma Banks on Dominion (2014–2015), Marlize DeVoe on The Flash (2017–18), and the titular character in Reyka (2021). She has two South African Film and Television Awards as well as a nomination for an International Emmy Award.

== Career ==
Engelbrecht presented a local youth television programme called Take5 in the 1990s. Much of Engelbrecht's work is localised in Johannesburg. She had a starring role in the South African film Bunny Chow, directed by John Barker.

She got her first big break at the age of 12 when she landed the lead role of Sara in an Italian production, Sarahsara, in which she played the role of a 12-year-old girl of Sudanese descent who swims from the Isle of Capri to Napoli in Italy.

Engelbrecht starred as Marlize DeVoe in the fourth season (2017–2018) of The Flash. In an interview with Kyle Zeeman of the Sunday Times, she said:

"It was amazing working with actors like Grant Gustin (who plays The Flash) and Neil Sandilands, who is also a South African. I am coming into a show that is the biggest on its network and is already on its fourth season. It has a huge fan base and that comes with a huge amount of pressure. I understand that it is a big show. That it is a big deal (for South Africa) and I just really want to do well."

== Filmography ==
=== Film ===
Year	Title	Role	Notes
1994	Sarahsara	Sarah	
2004	Boy Called Twist	Nancy	
2005	The Flyer	Mickey	
2006	Bunny Chow	Kim	
2013	Death Race 3: Inferno	Kelly O'Donnell	Direct-to-video
2014	Konfetti	Bianca Beekman	
2015	Eye in the Sky	Lucy Galvez	
2017	Dating Game Killer	Joanne	

=== Television ===
Year	Title	Role	Notes
1998	Isidingo	Lolly van Onselen	
2012	Rugby Motors	Leona	
2013	Wie is de Mol?	Herself	
2013	Mad Dogs	Greta	1 episode
2013	Geraamtes in die Kas	Aesha Abrahams	
2014	SAF3	Becca Connors	4 episodes
2014–2015	Dominion	Sgt Noma Banks	Main role
2017	Deadly Leaks 2	Layla	Television film
2017–2018	The Flash	Marlize DeVoe	Season 4 (15 episodes)
2021	Bulletproof	Megan	3 episodes
2021	Reyka	Reyka Gama	Lead role
2022	Raised By Wolves	Decima	5 episodes

== Awards and nominations ==
Year	Award	Category	Work	Result	Ref.
2010	South African Film and Television Awards	Best Supporting Actress in a Soap	Isidingo	Won	
2013	South African Film and Television Awards	Best Actress in a Soap	Isidingo	Nominated	
2022	South African Film and Television Awards	Best Actress in a TV Drama	Reyka	Won	
2022	International Emmy Awards	Best Actress	Reyka	Nominated	
