= Bunny Chow (film) =

- Directed by: John Barker
- Written by: John Barker; David Kibuuka; Joey Rasdien; Salah Sabiti
- Produced by: John Barker; Leanne Callanan; Isaac Kaminsky; Kagiso Lediga
- Starring: David Kibuuka; Keren Neumann; Kim Engelbrecht; Kagiso Lediga; Joey Rasdien; Jason Cope
- Cinematography: Zeno Petersen
- Edited by: Sakie Bergh
- Music by: Joel Assaizky
- Distributed by: Deviant Selling
- Release date: 11 September 2006 (Toronto International Film Festival)
- Running time: 95 minutes
- Country: South Africa
- Language: English

Bunny Chow (also billed as Bunny Chow Know Thyself) is a South African comedy film by John Barker, partnered by MTV. It premiered on 7 September 2006 at the Toronto International Film Festival.

== Synopsis ==
Bunny Chow follows the weekend journey of four stand-up comedians, who embark on a road trip to Oppikoppi, South Africa's biggest annual rock festival. The four slip out of their normal lives for a few days with hopes of mass debauchery, drugs, rampant sex, true love and conquering the rock stages with their comedy, but they get a bit more than what they bargained for.

== Cast ==
- David Kibuuka
- Kim Engelbrecht
- Kagiso Lediga
- Joey Yusuf Rasdien
- Jason Cope

== Awards ==
- Las Palmas de Gran Canaria 2007
- Sithengi 2006
- FCAT 2008

== Release ==
The movie was released March 21, 2008 in the United Kingdom and 19 May 2009 on DVD. The Movie has a score of 17% on Rotten Tomatoes.
