= Jason Cope =

South African actor

- Born: United Kingdom
- Other names: Benoit Franc
- Occupation: Actor
- Notable work: Mermaids: The Body Found, Dredd

Jason Cope is a British and South African actor. He starred and played multiple roles in the 2009 Academy Award-nominated science fiction film District 9.

== Career ==
In 2004, Cope played a variety of roles on the second season of the SABC1 comedy show The Pure Monate Show. In 2008, he played the character of Howard Weaver in the MNet miniseries Ella Blue. The title character of the miniseries was portrayed by actress Nathalie Blott, who would go on to costar with Cope in the film District 9. Since 2010, he has also played a "Field Reporter" on eTV's satirical news show Late Nite News with Loyiso Gola.

In the 2009 film District 9, Cope played a variety of characters including the alien Christopher Johnson, created entirely through CGI using Cope's motion captured performance. This process creates a character modeled on the performance of an actor or actress, allowing for on-camera performances including interaction with the other cast members. He also played the character Grey Bradnam, one of the narrators of the film, and provided the majority of the background voice work in the film, including the cameraman Trent. In a deleted scene of the movie, Cope also played a doctor at a clinic visited by the film's protagonist, who was seeking to have his arm amputated due to being infected with alien DNA. The scene is featured as part of the movie's DVD "extras."

In 2010, he also had a costarring role in the South African-produced film Spud, opposite veteran actor John Cleese.

In 2012, Cope had a minor role in DREDD 3D as one of the thugs killed during the film's introduction sequence. In 2015, he played a Tetravaal Lead Mechanic in Neill Blomkamp's science-fiction film Chappie.

== Filmography ==
- 2013: Spud 2: The Madness Continues — Sparerib
- 2013: Dredd — Zwirner
- 2012: Mermaids: The Body Found (TV documentary) — Dr. Rodney Webster
- 2011: Spoon — Conway
- 2010: Spud — Sparerib / Mr. Wilson
- 2009: District 9 — Grey Bradnam / Christopher Johnson
- 2008: Doomsday — Wall guard
- 2008: Ella Blue (TV series) — Howard Weaver
- 2007: Big Fellas — Fabio / Wimpie
- 2007: Flood — Young survivor
- 2006: Bunny Chow — Cope
- 2006: Alive in Joburg — UN Official / alien
