= Wonder Boy for President =

- Directed by: John Barker
- Written by: Camilo Saloojee; Chris Steenkamp; Kagiso Lediga; Saki Bergh; John Barker
- Starring: Kagiso Lediga; John Vlismas; Tony Miyambo; Ntosh Madlingozi
- Cinematography: Graham Boonzaaier
- Edited by: Saki Bergh
- Music by: Joel Assaizky; Alun Richards
- Production company: Barking Rat Films
- Release date: July 29, 2016
- Running time: 87 minutes
- Country: South Africa
- Language: English
- Budget: R500 000
- Box office: R345 000

Wonder Boy for President is a 2016 South-African mockumentary directed by John Barker. The world premiere took place 17 June 2016 at the Durban International Film Festival.

== Plot ==
The movie describes a young man from South Africa who is influenced by a group of corrupt people to run for president.

== Cast ==
- Kagiso Lediga
- Tony Miyambo
- Ntosh Madlingozi
- Thishiwe Ziqubu
- Zabalaza Sicelakuye Mchunu
- Lara Lipschitz
- David Kibuuka
- John Vlismas
- Loyiso Gola
- Mary Twala
- Bryan van Niekerk
- Akin Omotoso
- John Barker
- Tshepo Mogale
- Christopher Steenkamp
