= Cassette (South African band) =

South African rock band

- Genres: Rock
- Labels: Sony BMG EMI
- Members: Nathan Waywell; Jane Breetzke; Jon Savage; Andrew Wessels

Cassette is a South African rock band.

The band won the South African Music Awards in the Best Rock Album category in 2007 for their debut album Welcome Back To Earth. They were also nominated for two other categories, including the Best Group category. The group was nominated for the Best Live Performer category at the 2008 MTV Africa Music Awards. Cassette has collaborated with Mahotella Queens and Vusi Mahlasela among other great South African artists. They have also supported some international artists including Pink, Evanescence, Eagle-Eye Cherry and BLØF. They were the opening act for the 46664 Concert in December 2007. The group has toured Europe and were the first South African rock band to visit Japan in January 2008. They were the subject of the documentary Cassette: Who Do You Trust? (2012) by South African film maker John Barker.
