= Sven Ruygrok =

South African actor

- Born: 1991 (age 34–35); Johannesburg, South Africa
- Occupation: Actor
- Years active: 2010–present

Sven Ruygrok (born 1991) is a South African actor, best known for his role as Rambo in the Spud trilogy.

== Life and career ==
Sven Ruygrok was born in Johannesburg, South Africa, and began appearing in Kellogg's commercials at the age of fifteen. In 2009, he earned a diploma in dramatic arts from Beaulieu College. During adolescence, he also practiced artistic gymnastics and earned Junior National colours. However, his gymnastics aspirations were cut short by a knee injury in his final year of school.

In 2010, he started studying at the University of Cape Town and, simultaneously, obtained the role of Rambo in the film Spud, alongside John Cleese and Troye Sivan. He reprised this role in the sequels Spud 2: The Madness Continues (2013) and Spud 3: Learning to Fly (2014).

From 2011 to 2012, Ruygrok had a recurring role in the TV series Beaver Falls. He later appeared in the films A Cinderella Story: If the Shoe Fits (2016) and Bring It On: Worldwide Cheersmack (2017). In 2023, he joined the cast of the Netflix series One Piece in the role of Cabaji.

In 2025, he starred as Fuzz in the television film Star Trek: Section 31.

== Filmography ==
=== Film ===
Year	Title	Role	Notes
2010	Spud	Robert "Rambo" Black	Film debut
2013	Zulu	David Epkeen	
2013	Spud 2: The Madness Continues	Robert "Rambo" Black	
2013	House Party: Tonight's the Night	Simon	
2014	Alien Outpost	Frankie Forello	
2014	Spud 3: Learning to Fly	Robert "Rambo" Black	
2016	A Cinderella Story: If the Shoe Fits	Eddie	
2017	Bring It On: Worldwide Cheersmack	Jeff	
2018	Samson	Orum	
2018	Order of the Dragon	Marcos	Television film
2019	Critters Attack!	Upper classman	Television film
2020	The Empty Man	Acolyte	
2021	Good Life	Nikos	
2022	Eraser: Reborn	Mr. Chetty	
2023	Breathing In	Brand	
2024	Just Now Jeffrey	Sergeant	
2024	The Shakedown	Johan Fourie	
2025	Star Trek: Section 31	Fuzz	Television film

=== Television ===
Year	Title	Role	Notes
2011–2012	Beaver Falls	G-Dog	12 episodes
2013–2014	Bluestone 42	Tim	2 episodes
2016	Of Kings and Prophets	Elder's son	Episode "Little Lower Than the Angels"
2016	Jamillah and Aladdin	Prince Bashier	Episode "Genie Inspector"
2021	Around the World in 80 Days	Bank clerk	Episode 5
2022	Abraham Lincoln	George McClellan	Episode "A President at War"
2022	Pulse	Dom	6 episodes
2022	Theodore Roosevelt	Kermit Roosevelt	Episode "The Great Adventure"
2023	Warrior	Carter	Episode "A Soft Heart Won't Do You No Favors"
2023–present	One Piece	Cabaji	3 episodes
2024	Binnelanders	Stewart	12 episodes
