= John Barker (filmmaker) =

South African filmmaker

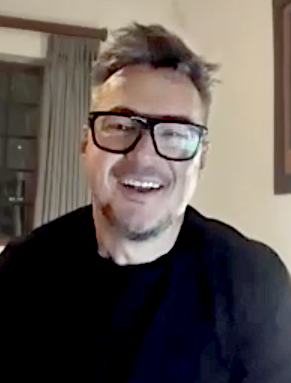
- Barker in 2022
- Occupation: filmmaker
- Father: Clive Barker
- Relatives: Steve Barker (cousin)

John Barker is a South African filmmaker based in Johannesburg. He gained prominence through his feature directorial debut Bunny Chow (2006), which screened at the Toronto International Film Festival (TIFF). His other films include Spud 3: Learning to Fly (2014), Wonder Boy for President (2015), and The Umbrella Men (2022).

== Early life ==
Barker was born to parents Clive Barker (Bafana Bafana coach) and Yvonne. During the 2010 FIFA World Cup in South Africa, Barker made a documentary Soccer: South of the Umbilo about his childhood growing up in the southern suburbs of Durban, which produced many soccer players and coaches including his father.

== Career ==
Barker wrote, directed and produced South Africa's first music mockumentary Blu Cheez. He next directed the music documentary Kwaito Generals produced by Kutloano Skosana of Black Rage, which focused on the stars who were at the forefront of the Kwaito movement of the late nineties and early 2000s. During this time he joined The Pure Monate Show. He directed sketches in season one and directed and co-wrote sketches for the second season.

Barker then wrote, produced and directed Bunny Chow, which employed a retro scripting technique with the actors improvising their dialogue to communicate the outlined script written by Barker, David Kibuuka, Kagiso Lediga, Joey Rasdien and editor Saki Bergh. Barker next directed Spud 3: Learning to Fly with Troye Sivan, John Cleese and Caspar Lee. Wonder Boy for President is his second retro scripted film with many of his collaborators from Bunny Chow; the film is a satirical look at South African politics. Barker later completed The Umbrella Men, selected to screen at the 2022 Toronto International Film Festival.. The sequel, 'The Umbrella Men: Escape from Robben Islan' was officially selected to screen at The Toronto International festival in 2023. John recently completed the six-part documentary series 'Class of '96: Rise of a Nation (previously known as Bafana the Boys). The series focuses on his father Clive Barker the coach of the unforgettable 1996 team which won AFCON 96 and qualified for South Africa's first World Cup appearance in 1998.

== Work ==
- The Pure Monate Show (2002)
- Channel O (2000 - 2003)
- Blu Cheez (2003)
- Kwaito Generals (2003)
- Bunny Chow (2006)
- Cassette: Who do you Trust (2007) documentary on South African band Cassette.
- Soccer: South of the Umbilo (2010)
- 31 Million Reasons (2011)
- Spud 3: Learning to Fly (2014)
- Wonder Boy for President (2015)
- The Umbrella Men (2022)
- The Umbrella Men: Escape from Robben Island (2024)
- Class of '96: Rise of a Nation (2026)
