= Spud (novel) =

2005 novel by John van de Ruit

- First (South African) edition
- Author: John van de Ruit
- Original title: Spud
- Translator: John van de Ruit
- Cover artist: Farell Grehan
- Language: English
- Subject: Boarding school life
- Genre: Novel
- Publisher: Penguin
- Publication date: 2005
- Publication place: South Africa
- Media type: Print (Paperback)
- Pages: 389pp
- ISBN: 978-0-14-302484-2
- OCLC: 87375897
- Followed by: Spud - The madness continues Spud - Learning to Fly; Spud - Exit, Pursued by a Bear

Spud is a 2005 novel by South African author, actor, playwright and producer, John van de Ruit. It is a comedic story about life in a boarding school through the diary of John 'Spud' Milton and the "crazy eight" - eight boys in Spud's year and house at school. The diary also follows Spud's family life.

A sequel, titled Spud: The Madness Continues, was released in mid-2007. It details Spud's second year of boarding school and trip to England paid by Wombat, his crazy grandmother.

In June 2009, the third book in the series was released, titled Spud: Learning to Fly. This book details Spud's third year at a school.

The fourth book in the series, detailing Spud's Matric year, was released August 2012, under the title Spud: Exit, Pursued by a Bear.

The fifth and final book was released in November 2024, under the title Spud: The Reunion.

After commercial success in South Africa and winning the 2006 Booksellers award, Spud was released in North America in 2007.

== Film adaptation ==
A film adaptation, directed by Donovan Marsh, was released in South Africa on 3 December 2010. The film stars South African-born Australian actor Troye Sivan as Spud and with John Cleese as The Guv. The film was a success in South Africa, topping the box office. The film was later nominated for six South African Film and Television Awards, including Best Feature Film and Best Actor in a Feature Film (Troye Sivan).

The sequel, Spud 2: The Madness Continues was released in 2013. A third film, Spud 3: Learning to Fly, was released in 2014.
