= Kagiso Lediga =

South African actor (born 1978)

- Born: 6 May 1978 (age 47); South Africa
- Occupations: Actor, comedian, filmmaker, writer
- Known for: Queen Sono, Catching Feelings, Bunny Chow, Pure Monate Show, The Bantu Hour

Kagiso Lediga (born 6 May 1978) is a South African actor, comedian, filmmaker and writer. He is the creator and executive producer of the Netflix crime drama Queen Sono which was released on 28 February 2020. Lediga has written and directed noteworthy television comedies including the cult classic The Pure Monate Show, Late Nite News with Loyiso Gola, and the Bantu Hour. He has played leading roles in the films Bunny Chow, Wonder Boy for President and Catching Feelings.

== Career ==
In 2017, Lediga co-produced, directed and starred in the romantic drama film Catching Feelings. On 10 December 2018, Lediga was announced as the creator and one of the executive producers of the Netflix crime drama series Queen Sono. Queen Sono was released on 28 February 2020 to positive reviews. In April 2020, the series was renewed by Netflix for a second season. However, on 26 November 2020, it was reported that Netflix has cancelled the series because of the production challenges brought on by the COVID-19 pandemic.

== Filmography ==
Year	Film	Genre	Role	Notes
2013	Mary and Martha	Drama	Kumi	
2015	Tell Me Sweet Something	Comedy	Katlego	Actor
2016	Wonder Boy for President	Comedy	Wonder Boy	Actor, Writer
2017	Catching Feelings	Drama	Max Matsane	Actor, director, writer
2017	Wizard	Drama		Director
2024	Mufasa: The Lion King	Drama	Young Rafiki	Voice Actor

Year	Television	Genre	Role	Notes
1997	The Phat Joe Show			
2004	Pure Monate Show		Actor	
2015	The Bantu Hour		Presenter, actor	
2020	Queen Sono	Crime drama	Creator, executive producer, director, writer	Netflix

== Awards ==
Year	Association	Category	Nominated work	Result	Ref.
2014	South African Film and Television Awards	Best Director of a TV Comedy	Late Nite News with Loyiso Gola	Nominated	
2014	South African Film and Television Awards	Best Writing Team of a TV Comedy	Late Nite News with Loyiso Gola	Nominated	
2015	South African Film and Television Awards	Best Achievement in Scriptwriting -TV Comedy	Late Nite News with Loyiso Gola	Nominated	
2015	South African Film and Television Awards	Best Achievement in Directing – TV Comedy	Late Nite News with Loyiso Gola	Nominated	
