= Vagrant Queen =

2020 Syfy TV series

- Genre: Science fiction; Space Western
- Created by: Jem Garrard
- Based on: Vagrant Queen by: Magdalene Visaggio; Jason Smith
- Starring: Adriyan Rae; Tim Rozon; Alex McGregor
- Country of origin: United States
- Original language: English
- No. of seasons: 1
- No. of episodes: 10

Production
- Executive producers: Lance Samuels; Daniel Iron; F. J. DeSanto; Damian Wassel; Dan March
- Production company: Blue Ice Pictures

Original release
- Network: Syfy
- Release: March 27 – June 4, 2020

Vagrant Queen is an American science fiction television series that premiered on Syfy on March 27, 2020. The series, co-produced by Blue Ice Pictures, is based on the Vault comic book series written by Magdalene Visaggio and illustrated by Jason Smith. In June 2020, the series was canceled after one season.

== Premise ==
Elida has built a life as a scavenger and outlaw, but when an old frenemy, Isaac, turns up with news about her long-lost mother, she is forced to return to her broken kingdom with Isaac and Amae in hopes of staging a rescue before a deadly childhood foe, Commander Lazaro, finds them.

== Cast ==
=== Main ===
- Adriyan Rae as Elida (aka. Eldaya) Al-Feyr
- Tim Rozon as Isaac Stelling
- Alex McGregor as Amae Rali

=== Recurring ===
- Bonnie Mbuli as Xevelyn
- Colin Moss as Hath
- Paul du Toit as Commander Ori Lazaro, later Grand Supreme Leader
- Steven John Ward as Chaz Rali
- Leon Clingman as Dengar
- Jennifer Steyn as Ihred

== Episodes ==
No.	Title	Directed by	Written by	Original release date	U.S. viewers (millions)
1	"A Royal Ass-Kicking"	Jem Garrard	Jem Garrard	March 27, 2020	0.375
Former queen Elida is cornered by her nemesis. An old friend comes to her aid, delivering big news.
2	"Yippee Ki Yay"	Jem Garrard	Jem Garrard	April 3, 2020	0.310
The team are forced to stop for repairs, but the cannibals who inhabit the planet have other plans
3	"Nobody's Queen"	Danishka Esterhazy	Mika Collins	April 10, 2020	0.208
Elida deals with the life she left behind. Isaac and Amae find themselves in dangerous territory.
4	"In a Sticky Spot"	Danishka Esterhazy	Mariko Tamaki	April 23, 2020 (Note: Released on digital marketplaces such as Amazon Prime Video and iTunes on April 17, 2020.)	0.182
A stealth mission through the Republic border becomes a fight for survival as Lazaro closes in.
5	"Temple of Doom"	Natalie Haarhoff & Cindy Lee	Jem Garrard	April 30, 2020	0.168
The team arrive on Wix to unexpected revelations. Betrayal leads to a bloody showdown.
6	"Requiem for the Republic"	Natalie Haarhoff & Cindy Lee	Mika Collins	May 7, 2020	0.208
The team must fix their ship while avoiding the dangers of Wix. Lazaro begins his ascent to power.
7	"Sunshine Express Yourself"	Jem Garrard	Mariko Tamaki	May 14, 2020	0.189
Elida leaves the team to take a scav job while Isaac and Amae battle hijackers on board a train.
8	"No Clue"	Jem Garrard	Mika Collins & Mariko Tamaki	May 21, 2020	0.155
Adrift in space, the team find themselves in the middle of a very strange murder mystery.
9	"All Old Things Must Pass – Part 1"	Jem Garrard	Jem Garrard	May 28, 2020	0.229
The team arrive on Arriopa to take down Lazaro. A face from the past unexpectedly returns.
10	"All Old Things Must Pass – Part 2"	Jem Garrard	Jem Garrard	June 4, 2020	0.215
Arriopa is in chaos. Elida makes a final push to stop Lazaro, but a shocking new threat arises.

== Production ==
On May 17, 2019, it was announced that Syfy had given a straight-to-series order to adapt the comic book series Vagrant Queen. Blue Ice Pictures produced the TV series with F. J. DeSanto & Damian Wassel of Vault Comics. Jem Garrard served as showrunner and also directed certain episodes as well as Danishka Esterhazy. Writers for the show included Jem Garrard, Mariko Tamaki, and Mika Collins, with Gerrard having written about a third of the episodes.

=== Casting ===
On May 17, 2019, Adriyan Rae was cast as Elida, Tim Rozon as Isaac, and Paul du Toit as Commander Lazaro. On February 14, 2020, Alex McGregor was revealed to be Amae in the show.

=== Filming ===
On May 17, 2019, principal photography was set for July 2019 in Cape Town, South Africa.

== Release ==
On September 23, 2019, Syfy released the first teaser trailer for the series. On February 14, 2020, Syfy released key art for the series and set the premiere date for March 27, 2020.

The series premiered on March 27, 2020 and was scheduled air its run on Fridays at 10 p.m. (ET), but the April 17 episode was preempted and moved to April 23 (Thursday) at 11 p.m. — possibly indicating that the network began burning off the remaining episodes ahead of cancellation. On June 26, Syfy confirmed the cancellation of the series after one season due to low ratings.

== Home media ==
Vagrant Queen was released on Blu-ray and DVD by Dazzler Media on July 13, 2020 for Region 2. Other versions were released for the French market, an alternate UK version and various streaming services.
