= Zee Ntuli =

South African film director

- Citizenship: South African
- Occupation: filmmaker
- Known for: Bomlambo (Those Of The Water)

Zee Ntuli is a South African filmmaker.

Ntuli's directorial debut was Bomlambo (Those Of The Water) (2013), shown at the Clermont-Ferrand International Short Film Festival. Hard To Get (2014) was a romantic thriller, "a story about falling in love and how scary it can be to trust a stranger". The film opened the 2014 Durban International Film Festival, and was shown at the BFI London Film Festival.

Filmography
Film	Year	Writers	Producers
Hard To Get	2014	Zee Ntuli and TT Sibizi	Helena Spring and Junaid Ahmed
South Africa Factory	2016	Alejandro Fadel, Sheetal Magan, Isabel Mayer, Zamo Mkhwanazi, Martin Morganfeld, Samantha Nell, Zee Nthuli, Michael Wahrmann	

Television	Year
Mashika Shika	2012
Room 9	2012
Those Who Can't	2015
Reyka	2021
