= Ed Jordan =

- Born: Edward Paul Jordan; 2 March 1969; Johannesburg
- Citizenship: South Africa
- Occupation(s): musician, composer, singer-songwriter, actor, TV and radio presenter

Ed Jordan (born Edward Paul Jordan, 2 March 1969, Johannesburg) is a South African musician, composer, singer-songwriter, actor, TV and radio presenter. His most recent work was for Spud the Movie starring John Cleese, where he wrote and produced the orchestral score and the theme songs as working as music supervisor on the film. Jordan is known in South Africa for his pop rock songs and ballads, presenting the TV show Deal Or No Deal and for his Beautiful Creatures children's brand, which he co-founded in 2004.

The Beautiful Creatures Musical is currently on stage at Montecasino. Jordan provided music for two episodes of the Wild at Heart. He has also released The Best of Ed Jordan compilation album for Christmas 2011.

== Music ==
During the 1990s, Jordan wrote and played keyboard for South African acts, Wendy Oldfield, T.K., the Rasta Rebels and Mango Groove. He has also supported Bryan Ferry, Hootie and the Blowfish, Crowded House and Ronan Keating on their South African tours. Following the success of Jordan's TV program "The Wedding Show", he released his fourth solo album, For Always featuring the hit single "Goddess". Tonight was Jordan's fifth studio album.
