= Rayda Jacobs =

South African writer and filmmaker (1947–2024)

- Born: 6 March 1947; Cape Town, South Africa
- Died: 29 October 2024 (aged 77); Toronto, Ontario, Canada
- Occupations: Filmmaker; writer
- Children: 2

Rayda Jacobs (6 March 1947 – 29 October 2024) was a South African writer and filmmaker.

== Life and career ==
Jacobs was born in Diep River, Cape Town, on 6 March 1947. She began writing at a young age. In 1968, she moved to Toronto, Canada. She married there, had two children and later divorced. Her first book The Middle Children, a collection of short stories, was published in Canada in 1994. Jacobs returned to South Africa the following year. Her novel Eyes of the Sky, published in 1996, received the Herman Charles Bosman Prize for English fiction.

She wrote a series of feature articles for the Cape Times and hosted radio programs. She also produced and directed documentaries for television, including God Has Many Names and Portrait of Muslim Women.

Jacobs died in Toronto, Ontario, on 29 October 2024, at the age of 77.

== Selected works ==
- The Slave Book, novel (1998)
- Sachs Street, novel (2001)
- Confessions of a Gambler, novel (2003), received the Sunday Times Fiction Prize and the Herman Charles Bosman Prize, adapted for film
