= Ross Garland =

South African film producer, cricket player

- Born: June 26, 1974 (age 52)
- Citizenship: South Africa
- Education: Durban High School, University of Oxford
- Occupation: film producer

Ross Garland (born June 26, 1974) is a South African film producer and founder of the production company Rogue Star Films. He has produced films including Confessions of a Gambler, Big Fellas, U-Carmen eKhayelitsha, and Spud. He won the Golden Bear for Best Film at the Berlin International Film Festival in 2005.

He attended Durban High School and studied at the University of Oxford, Brasenose College, as a Rhodes Scholar, and has degrees in Drama, Psychology and Law. He played first-class cricket in 12 matches for Oxford University Cricket Club.

After spending time in New York, USA in 2001, he returned to his native South Africa, where he worked as an Advocate at the Cape Bar, in Cape Town, South Africa until relocating to Australia in 2016 where he currently resides.
