= Spud 3: Learning to Fly =

- Film poster
- Directed by: John Barker
- Written by: John van de Ruit
- Based on: Spud: Learning to Fly by John van de Ruit
- Produced by: Ross Garland
- Starring: Troye Sivan; John Cleese; Caspar Lee
- Cinematography: Willie Nel
- Edited by: Megan Gill
- Music by: Jon Savage; Jane Breetzke
- Production companies: MGM Television; Rogue Star Films
- Distributed by: Metro-Goldwyn-Mayer; Nu Metro Cinemas
- Release date: 15 November 2014
- Running time: 89 minutes
- Country: South Africa
- Language: English

Spud 3: Learning to Fly is a 2014 South African comedy film written by John van de Ruit, directed by John Barker and starring Troye Sivan, John Cleese and Caspar Lee. It is the second sequel to the 2010 film Spud following Spud 2: The Madness Continues (2013). It is based on van de Ruit's novel Spud - Learning to Fly.

== Plot ==
In 1992 South Africa, sixteen-year-old John "Spud" Milton (Troye Sivan) spends his third year at the elite boarding school, is reunited with his classmates, the Crazy Eight, and is introduced to their new member, "Garlic". They are also introduced to the new acting headmaster, the "New Glock".

The new housemaster, Mr. Richardson, nicknamed "Viking", informs Spud that his scholarship could be taken away because of his poor academic record. He also tells him to in order to keep his scholarship, he must prove his very own worthiness. And lastly, he informs him and the other Crazy Eight members that three new school prefects will be chosen to lead the school next year. But Rambo refuses to go along with the idea and tells Spud that he’s either with the Crazy Eight or against them.

Later, Spud informs the Guv about his scholarship being taken away, so he tells him to fight as hard as he can in order to win it back; in addition, the Guv introduces him to a new librarian. Spud's name is added to the confirmation classes list, and he regretfully informs Rambo that he's breaking the pact.

Spud spends a weekend at a camp with his girlfriend Debbie, only to break up with her later that night. When he returns home the following day, his mother informs him that his father is having an affair with a new neighbor named Amber. Later that night, Spud is paid a visit by his uncle Frank, who informs him that his father has gone missing, so they find him and take him home.

The Guv informs Spud that he has been spying on the librarian for weeks. Later, he and the other members of the Crazy Eight audition for a school play titled A Midsummer Night's Dream.

During the third team, the Crazy Eight, along with Viking, are attending a speech at the St. Catherine's School for Girls when Spud, his father and Uncle Frank cause trouble by crashing their car into a flagpole. Spud and the other Crazy Eight members are later quarantined from school by the headmistress Ms. Owen, nicknamed "Bulldog".

One night, Christine quietly leads Spud and his friends, except for Rambo and Simon, out of the school and into a nearby building to have some fun, but when the alarm goes off, they make their escape, only to be caught at the last minute by Viking and Bulldog. The next day, Christine is grounded.

While performing in the school's play, Spud is publicly humiliated, so he and his friends sabotage the entire show by short-circuiting the controls and scaring the entire audience away, which causes Viking to be sent to the hospital after having a heart attack. Rambo and Simon blame Spud and his friends for ruining the school play and declare that the Crazy Eight are done, this time for good.

During the summer holidays, Spud shows his father divorce papers, which were given to him by his mother. Spud's father reminds him to tell his mother to give them to him on Friday. A few nights later, Spud's father declares the grand opening of Frank's Bar and Grill, and gives thanks to both his son Spud and his beloved wife, who he finally reconciles with. Debbie also reconciles with Spud, and they celebrate by having drinks together.

During final term, Viking returns to the school and dismisses the charges of sabotage, arson and disrespect in Shakespeare. Later on, the Guv reminds Spud about his scholarship and tells him to say some very important stuff at the election speech.

At the speech, Spud tells everyone the entire story about his scholarship, how he broke the pact with the Crazy Eight, and how he wanted to prove his worthiness. He also tells them that the reason why he wanted to stay is because it's his friends that make them who they are, not the achievements.

At the election, the New Glock announces the new prefects: Larson House, Chris Roach, Simon Brown, Robert Black and John Milton. Spud is not only congratulated by his classmates on becoming the new prefect, but is also awarded the Albert T. Entwistle memorial scholarship by the New Glock. In the end, Spud remarks, "I can't explain it, other than to say it's a warped universal law. Desire something too much, and it plays games with your heart. But walk away from what you love, and you find out what's inside you, what sets you free."

== Cast ==
- Troye Sivan as Spud
- John Cleese as The Guv
- Caspar Lee as Garlic
- Sven Ruygrok as Rambo
- Blessing Xaba as Fatty
- Genna Blair as Mermaid
- Travis Hornsby as Boggo
- Aaron McIlroy as Spud's Dad
- Graham Weir as Mr "Viking" Richardson

== Production ==
The film was shot in Cape Town.

== Release ==
The film was released 15 November 2014 in South Africa. Grossing $327,791 theatrically.

== Reception ==
Radio Times awarded the film two stars out of five.
