= Confessions of a Gambler =

2007 South African drama

- Directed by: Rayda Jacobs
- Written by: Rayda Jacobs
- Starring: Rayda Jacobs
- Release dates: 14 December 2007
- Country: South Africa
- Language: English

Confessions of a Gambler is a 2007 South African drama by Rayda Jacobs, who directed, wrote, and had a leading role in the film. It was also co-directed by Amanda Lane. Based on a true story, the plot revolves around a Muslim woman on the brink of ludomania after learning of her son's diagnosis with AIDS. The book on which it is based won The Sunday Times Fiction Prize in 2004. In the 3rd edition of the South African Film and Television Awards, the film was nominated in many categories and won the golden horn for best film score.
