= Spud 2: The Madness Continues =

2013 South African comedy film

- Film poster
- Directed by: Donovan Marsh
- Written by: Donovan Marsh
- Based on: Spud: The Madness Continues by John van de Ruit
- Produced by: Ross Garland
- Starring: John Cleese; Troye Sivan
- Cinematography: Lance Gewer
- Edited by: Megan Gill
- Music by: Ed Jordan
- Production companies: MGM Television; Rogue Star Films
- Distributed by: Metro-Goldwyn-Mayer; Nu Metro Cinemas
- Release dates: 6 June 2013 (Seattle); 21 June 2013 (South Africa)
- Running time: 91 minutes
- Country: South Africa
- Language: English

Spud 2: The Madness Continues is a 2013 South African comedy film written and directed by Donovan Marsh and starring Troye Sivan and John Cleese. It is the sequel to the 2010 film Spud.

== Plot ==
In 1991 South Africa, fifteen-year-old John "Spud" Milton (Troye Sivan) spends his second year at the elite boarding school and is reunited with his classmates, the Crazy Eight. They not only face expulsion from Mr. Wilson, nicknamed "Sparerib", but are also bullied by three prefects, who are named Greg Anderson, Guy Emberton and "Death Breath".

The Crazy Eight forge weekend passes, sneak quietly out of the school and make enough money to win a hot dog eating competition at a farm show. The following day, when the Glock learns about the hot dog competition, via a newspaper article, he not only bans Spud and company from going to the Midlands Festival, but also puts them on final warning.

The Crazy Eight conspire to get rid of Sparerib and the prefects once and for all. One night, while Sparerib is out buying cigarettes, they go over to his house and make a videotape of Rambo and Mrs. Wilson, Sparerib's wife, nicknamed "Eve". When Sparerib returns, Spud and his friends quietly make their escape while Rambo gets thrown out of the house by Eve.

The next day, Spud learns that the Guv has been offered early retirement by the Glock, and convinces him to stay at school for as long as possible. Later, Spud and his team go into the forest and take refuge in a hideaway while declaring war against Sparerib and the prefects. During the war, they are forced by Sparerib and the prefects to audition for a school play titled "Noah's Ark".

One night, during a house social, Mad Dog forces another group of bullies, otherwise known as the "Normal Seven", to humiliate a group of school girls and scare them away. He is placed on absolute final warning by the Glock the following day and threatened with expulsion.

During silly season, Sparerib and the prefects sneak into the forest, expose the hideout of the Crazy Eight, and force Spud to admit everything that he has written in his diary. The following morning, the Glock expels Rambo and Mad Dog from school and places the remaining members of the Crazy Eight not only on absolute final warning, but also on a three-week suspension.

When Spud sees a flyer of the Midlands Festival, he comes up with a crazy plan to get Rambo back and get revenge on Sparerib and the prefects. First, he leaves Sparerib a copy of the tape of Rambo and Eve; he then convinces the Guv to take him and the remaining members of the Crazy Eight on a field trip to the Midlands Festival to win another hot dog eating competition.

When Sparerib watches the tape of Rambo and Eve and finds out about Spud and company at the Midlands Festival, he tracks them down and prepares to have them expelled. But Spud gains the upper hand by starting a food fight which finally puts Sparerib and the prefects in a very dangerous and difficult position.

A very furious Glock places the former prefects on absolute final warning and strips them of their privileges, then prepares to have Spud and the remaining members of the Crazy Eight expelled. But the Guv intervenes and convinces him to change his mind. He reveals to him the truth about Sparerib threatening to expel Spud and his friends from school and shows him the copy of the tape of Rambo and Eve as evidence.

The Glock finally allows Spud and his friends to stay at school and convinces them to keep the Rambo and Eve tape a secret. He then turns to Sparerib and fires him from school as housemaster. Rambo is finally reunited with Spud and company. They are awarded for their success and honor. In the end, Spud remarks, "We may not have earned a place on our Honors Board in the Great Hall. We proudly carved our names to the mad history of our school."

== Cast ==
- Troye Sivan as Spud
- John Cleese as The Guv
- Jason Cope as Sparerib
- Jeremy Crutchley as The Glock
- Sven Ruygrok as Rambo
- Josh Goddard as Mad Dog
- Travis Hornsby as Boggo
- Harold Hendricks as Death Breath
- Byron Langley as Simon
- Tanit Phoenix as Eve
- Charlbi Dean Kriek as Amanda
- Aaron McIlroy as Spud's Dad
- Julie Summers as Spud's Mom
- Blessing Xaba as Fatty

== Reception ==
Radio Times awarded the film two stars out of five.
