= Michael Moore (offensive lineman) =

American football player (born 1976)

Mookie Moore
No. 66, 67
- Position: Guard

Personal information
- Born: November 1, 1976 (age 50); Fayette, Alabama, U.S.
- Listed height: 6 ft 4 in (1.93 m)
- Listed weight: 318 lb (144 kg)

Career information
- High school: Fayette County (AL)
- College: Alabama; Troy State
- NFL draft: 2000: 4th round, 129th overall pick

Career history
- Washington Redskins (2000); Denver Broncos (2001–2002); Frankfurt Galaxy (2003); Atlanta Falcons (2003–2004); Green Bay Packers (2006)*
- * Offseason or practice squad member only
- Stats at Pro Football Reference

Michael Kenneth "Mookie" Moore (born November 1, 1976) is an American former professional football player who was a guard in the National Football League (NFL). He played college football for the Alabama Crimson Tide and Troy Trojans.

== Football career ==
Moore played college football at the University of Alabama and Troy State University. He was selected in the fourth round of the 2000 NFL draft. Moore played for the National Football League (NFL) teams of Washington Redskins and the Atlanta Falcons.

== Personal life ==
Moore is the brother of Devin Moore, a death row convict of the Strickland v. Sony case. He became a member of Phi Beta Sigma fraternity through the Theta Delta chapter at the University of Alabama.
