= The Gamechangers =

2015 British docudrama

- Title card
- Genre: Docudrama
- Written by: James Wood
- Directed by: Owen Harris
- Starring: Daniel Radcliffe; Bill Paxton; Ian Keir Attard; Mark Wienman; Joe Dempsie; Fiona Ramsay
- Theme music composer: Vince Pope
- Composer: Vince Pope
- Country of origin: United Kingdom
- Original language: English

Production
- Executive producer: Mark Hedgecoe
- Producer: Jim Spencer
- Production locations: South Africa, New York, London
- Running time: 90 minutes

Original release
- Network: BBC Two
- Release: 15 September 2015

The Gamechangers is a 2015 British docudrama produced by the BBC. The programme is an unauthorised depiction of the controversies caused by Grand Theft Auto, a successful video game series, as various attempts were made to halt the production of the games.

Directed by Owen Harris and written by James Wood, the film centres on the legal feud between Rockstar Games president Sam Houser (Daniel Radcliffe) and Florida attorney Jack Thompson (Bill Paxton) over the video games and the debate regarding the psychological effects of violent video games.

It is based on the book Jacked: The Outlaw Story of Grand Theft Auto by David Kushner. It was one of the nine programmes launched under the BBC's Make it Digital season in September 2015 and was co-produced by The Open University.

== Synopsis ==
On October 27, 2002, a year after the release of Grand Theft Auto III, the American gaming company Rockstar Games releases Grand Theft Auto: Vice City, which immediately shatters sales records, with 1 million units sold within 24 hours, and is universally acclaimed for its authenticity, scale and gameplay.

Inspired by the success of the game, the heads of Rockstar, brothers Sam and Dan Houser, immediately begin planning and researching for another, even larger and more elaborate game, one that moves away from Vice City's crime movie origins and bases its premise on the war between African-American street gangs in South Central Los Angeles during the early 90s.

The following June, however, 18-year-old Devin Moore, a persistent player of Vice City, shoots dead three people at a police station in Fayette, Alabama before he steals a cop car. His case catches the eye of conservative Florida-based attorney Jack Thompson who, upon questioning Devin in prison and playing the game for himself, theorises that the game's violent content and alleged glamorisation of criminal activity may have been the primary cause for his rampage.

Thompson gathers together some expert analysis of the effects of violent images on human brains and the use of violent video games in the military before he files a lawsuit against Rockstar Games and its publisher Take-Two Interactive, seeking damages on behalf of the families of the murdered personnel. This immediately earns him and his family the ire of the game's fans who start vandalising their house and making threatening phone calls.

Because of Thompson's outspokenness, unprofessional conduct and violation of court protocol, such as appearing on television to discuss the case in detail, comparing the game to Michael Bay's Pearl Harbor and sending aggressive emails to the defendants, he is taken off the case, which is immediately thrown out on the basis that none of the remaining claimants had ever met Devin, despite claiming to be discussing his motivation. Thompson is outraged and, to make matters worse, Rockstar's law firm Blank Rome decides to start legal proceedings to have him disbarred for his conduct.

Although Rockstar Games is in the clear, Sam is left feeling frustrated, believing that modern parents, politicians and lawyers like Thompson are blaming him, his company and the games in place of acknowledging their own failings in raising their children properly and preventing them from getting involved in criminal activity. His frustration and stress soon boils over into his work life, where his new game, along with several others that the company is working on (Bully and Manhunt 2) is already six months behind schedule, and he begins to overwork his producer and friend Jamie King while becoming irritable with his staff. Eventually, Grand Theft Auto: San Andreas is released on October 26, 2004, almost exactly two years after Vice City. The game is met with almost as much acclaim as its predecessor with its customisable character being the main focus for praise.

In June 2005, a modder in the Netherlands, Patrick Wildenborg, discovers a minigame within the coding of the original files which features a crude sex scene between the protagonist Carl Johnson (CJ) and his girlfriend. The scene was something that Sam had initially wanted to include in the game but had eventually been forced to drop to retain the game's "M" rating with the ESRB, although he had left the code for the scene on the disc because of his concern that removing it would potentially affect the rest of the game and push its already overdue release date back.

Patrick makes the mod publicly known on YouTube, provoking outrage and, in turn, causing the ESRB to change the game's rating to "AO", resulting in most mainstream retailers in the United States pulling the game from their shelves. Seeing this, Thompson is inspired to restart his campaign against Rockstar, organising a protest outside their New York headquarters. He is soon summoned to meet with then-Senator Hillary Clinton who likewise wishes to change the law regarding the sale of violent video games to minors.

Sam is forced to testify before the FTC to explain how the mod made it onto the final copy of the game while at the same time Thompson is brought before a disciplinary hearing by the Florida Bar regarding his earlier actions. Ultimately, Rockstar settles their case, and Thompson is disbarred.

A relieved Sam soon wanders the streets at night, imagining the environment around him becoming that of a Grand Theft Auto game as the film ends.

== Cast ==
- Daniel Radcliffe as Sam Houser, co-founder and president of Rockstar Games
- Bill Paxton as Jack Thompson
- Ian Keir Attard as Dan Houser, VP of creative at Rockstar Games
- Mark Weinman as Terry Donovan, VP of marketing at Rockstar Games
- Joe Dempsie as Jamie King, VP of development at Rockstar Games
- Fiona Ramsay as Patricia Thompson
- Alex McGregor as Bridjet
- Shannon Esra as Jen Kolbe, head of the publishing team at Rockstar Games
- Nick Boraine as Doug Lowenstein, president of the Entertainment Software Association
- Jenna Dover as Pat Vance
- Thabo Rametsi as Devin Moore
- Gideon Lombard as Patrick Wildenborg, a Dutch modder who rose to fame after uncovering the 'Hot Coffee' minigame within the code of GTA San Andreas
- Stephen Jennings as Lieutenant Colonel Dave Grossman

== Controversy ==
In May 2015, Rockstar filed a lawsuit against the BBC for trademark infringement, stating that they had no involvement with the development of the film and had unsuccessfully tried to contact the BBC to resolve the matter.

== Reception ==
IGN awarded it a score of 4.5 out of 10, saying "The story of GTA is a great one that deserves to be told, but Gamechangers barely scratches the surface." Benji Wilson of The Telegraph awarded it 4 stars out of 5 and stated that "Radcliffe is excellent" and particularly praised the Alabama shooting scene for it having a similar perspective to games like Grand Theft Auto.
