= Thabo Rametsi =

South African actor (born 1988)

- Born: Thabo Andrew Rametsi II; 17 July 1988 (age 38); Umlazi, South Africa
- Occupation: Actor
- Years active: 2004–present

Thabo Andrew Rametsi II (born 17 July 1988) is a South African actor and producer. He is best known for his roles in The Giver, The Gamechangers and Kalushi: The Story of Solomon Mahlangu.

== Personal life ==
He was born on 17 July 1988 in Umlazi, KwaZulu-Natal, South Africa. He later moved to Kempton Park and studied at Norkem Park Primary School and later attended to Norkem Park High School. During school times, he developed his skills of acting, and acted in several television commercials and plays. He later graduated with a degree in law at UNISA.

In January 2019, he was allegedly brutalised by a group of Johannesburg's Community Policing Forum (CPF) members.

== Career ==
In 2010, he made his acting debut with the SABC1 acting competition series Class Act. Then in 2011, he played the role 'David' in the television series Wild at Heart. In 2012, he made cinema debut with Fanie Fourie's Lobola and played the role 'Motlatsi. He also appeared on television serials such as High Rollers as orphan 'Muzi Khuzwayo' in 2013.

In 2014, he made a guest role in an episode of the popular international television series Homeland. Then he acted in the television movie The Gamechangers and played the role of serial killer 'Devin Moore' alongside renowned international actors Daniel Radcliffe and Bill Paxton. In 2016, he became famous with the feature film Kalushi: The Story of Solomon Mahlangu, which was based on a true story. In the film, he played the lead role 'Solomon Kalushi Mahlangu', who was executed by the apartheid government at the age of 23. In September 2016, he won the Best Actor Award for this role at the inaugural BRICS Film Festival in India.

In 2017, he played the role investigative reporter 'Tebogo Ramolang' in the fourth season of the television series Hard Copy.

== Filmography ==
Year	Film	Role	Genre	Ref.
2011	Wild at Heart	David	TV series	
2013	Fanie Fourie's Lobola	Motlatsi	Film	
2014	The Giver	Robbie	Film	
2014	Homeland	Private Bryce	TV series	
2014	Hard Copy	Tebogo Ramolang	TV series	
2015	The Gamechangers	Devin Moore	TV movie	
2016	Kalushi: The Story of Solomon Mahlangu	Solomon	Film	
2017	Madiba	Justice - Teen	TV mini-series	
2018	The Looming Tower	Officer Mburu	TV mini-series	
2018	Emoyeni	Bonga	TV mini-series	
2019	Shadow	Colin	TV series	
2019	2064		Film	
2020	The Flat Tires	Thabo	TV series	
2022	Amandla	Nkosana	Film	
2022	Silverton Siege	Calvin Khumalo	Film	
TBA	The Road Home †	Hugh Masekela	Film; filming	
