= Theta Delta =

Theta Delta or theta-delta (Greek: ΘΔ) may refer to:

- Theta Delta Chi, American collegiate social fraternity
- Theta Delta Sigma, American gender-inclusive multicultural collegiate fraternity
- Theta-delta, a symbol of the therian subculture
