= Hard Copy (South African TV series) =

- title card
- Genre: Drama
- Created by: Anton Harber; Malcolm Purkey; Jann Turner
- Written by: Darrel Bristow-Bovey (seasons 1–3)
- Country of origin: South Africa
- Original language: English
- No. of seasons: 4

Production
- Production location: South Africa
- Running time: 45 minutes
- Production company: Quizzical Pictures

Original release
- Network: SABC3
- Release: 23 February 2005 – 3 October 2016

Hard Copy is a South African television drama series created by Anton Harber, Malcolm Purkey and Jann Turner which follows the fortunes of the staff of a fictional newspaper which - due to the economic pressures of the times - finds itself on the media cusp between delivering news and sensationalism, before changing identity completely in Season 3 and becoming a tabloid.

== Plot ==
This is the life of the staff and owners of The Bulletin, a South African newspaper that finds itself on the media cusp between delivering news and sensationalism. When editors and their journalists find themselves publishing hard copy the dilemmas, intrigues and moments of hysteria they face are varied, vast and inevitable.

== Cast ==
Character	Portrayed by	Appearances			
Character	Portrayed by	Season 1	Season 2	Season 3	Season 4 Netflix Season 1
Main characters
Joe Dlamini	James Ngcobo	Main			
Dorothy Wilcox	Fiona Ramsay	Main	Main	Main	
Thabane "Cyril" Mkwane	Lindelani Buthelezi	Main	Main		
Ivan Ferris	Martin Le Maitre	Main	Main	Main	
Benny Jacobs	Jody Abrahams	Main	Main	Main	Main
Rocky Coetzee	Neels van Jaarsveld	Main			
Mandy le Roux	Kira Wilkinson	Main	Main		
Dinki Dube	Portia Gumede	Main			
Grant Fletcher	Darren Maule	Main	Main		
Xolani Modise	John Matshikiza		Main	Main	
Kim Smollen	Shannon Esra			Main	
Prince Modise	Buyile Mdladlaas			Main	
Khanya Langa	Masasa Mbangeni				Main
Jana Brink	Nicola Hanekom				Main
Leah Gumede	Nokuthula Ledwaba				Main
Steven Mhlanga	Dini Nondumo				Main
C.J. Swart	Armand Aucamp				Main
Trevor "Biggy T" Dlamini	Denzel Edgar				Main
Tebogo Ramolang	Thabo Rametsi				Main

== Episodes ==
Series	Episodes	Originally released
1	13	3 February 2005
2	13	12 October 2005
3	13	20 September 2006
4	13	3 October 2016

== Broadcast ==
The series was added to SABC3 streaming service Netflix season 1, 24 November 2020.
