= Waqt =

Waqt may refer to:

- The time schedule for Muslim prayers, see Salat times
- Waqt (1965 film), a 1965 film directed by Yash Chopra
- Waqt: The Race Against Time, a 2005 film directed by Vipul Amrutlal Shah and starring Amitabh Bachchan
- Waqt News, Pakistani news channel
- WAQT, former call letters of radio station WZBQ in Carrollton, Kentucky
