= Arthur Gavshon =

South African journalist (1916 - 1995)

- Born: Arthur Leslie Gavshon; 28 August 1916; Johannesburg, South Africa
- Died: 24 July 1995 (aged 78); London, United Kingdom
- Education: Pretoria Boys High School
- Occupation: Journalist
- Spouse: Audrey Ross
- Children: 3 daughters
- Relatives: Anton Harber

Arthur Leslie Gavshon (28 August 1916 – 24 July 1995) was a London-based South African journalist. He was a reporter for the Associated Press, and the author of three books of investigative journalism.

== Early life ==
Arthur Gavshon was born on 28 August 1916 in Johannesburg, South Africa. His parents were Lithuanian Jewish refugees.

Gavshon was educated at the Pretoria Boys High School.

== Career ==
Gavshon began his career at Express, a newspaper based in Johannesburg. He was also the associate editor of Libertas, a magazine opposed to the National Party's non-interventionist policy during World War II. After serving in the South African Army in Italy and North Africa during the war, he joined the Associated Press in 1945. He was the AP's London correspondent from 1947 to 1960, and later worked in Washington, D.C. as well as the AP's European correspondent. He retired in 1981.

Gavshon was the author of three books of investigative journalism. He was a critic of apartheid.

== Personal life and death ==
Gavshon married Audrey Ross in Hampstead, London in 1954. He was related to journalist Anton Harber. They had three daughters, Laura T Gavshon in 1955, Helena K Gavshon in 1957, and Evelyn A Gavshon in 1960. He died on 24 July 1995 in London.

== Selected works ==
- Gavshon, Arthur (1962). The Last Days of Dag Hammarskjold. New York: Walker and Company. OCLC 1373025.
- Gavshon, Arthur (1981). Crisis in Africa: Battleground of East and West. London, U.K.: Penguin Books. ISBN 9780140222395. OCLC 164625522.
- Gavshon, Arthur; Rice, Desmond (1984). The sinking of the Belgrano. Sevenoaks, U.K.: Hodder & Stoughton. OCLC 954576683.
