= Shannon Esra =

South African actress

- Born: Shannon Esrechowitz; 1 February 1984 (age 42); Johannesburg, South Africa
- Education: University of the Witwatersrand
- Occupation: Actress
- Years active: 2000–present
- Known for: Salaam-e-Ishq; The Queen; The River; Lioness

Shannon Esra (née Esrechowitz; born 1 February 1984) is a South African actress. She is known for playing the lawyer Sandra Stein in the drama series The Queen and The River and Samantha Hugo in the series Lioness. Esra is among the first Caucasian actresses to play a lead role in Bollywood in the film Salaam-e-Ishq.

== Early life ==
=== Early life and career beginning ===
Esra had her first "taste" of acting at age 4, narrating at a nursery school Purim concert. She later did impersonations of Elvis Presley at local talent contests.

Esra did her first professional acting at the age of 16, when she appeared in the film I Dreamed of Africa (starring Kim Basinger), playing a character named Siri. She later studied Dramatic Arts at the University of the Witwatersrand receiving her BA (Hons) Degree in 2003.

She won a Naledi Theatre Award for Best Performance by a Newcomer/Breakthrough (Female), in Dorothy Ann Gould's theatre production Japes for her portrayal of Neets. She also received a Fleur du Cap nomination for this role.

Other stage productions include the three-woman comedy Six Inches (2018) written and directed by Kristy Suttner, as well as the cabaret Homebound in 2004.

== Career ==
=== Television appearance ===
Esra made history in Bollywood with her portrayal of Stephanie in the film Salaam-e-Ishq: A Tribute to Love by being one of the first Caucasian actresses in a lead role. Dying her hair blonde and speaking in an American accent, Esra plays an American who travels to India to stop her boyfriend (played by Kushal Punjabi) from marrying. After reaching India, she met Raju, a taxi driver (played by Govinda) who comes to her assistance and she eventually falls in love with Raju.

In 2005 she guest-starred alongside Eric Stoltz, playing his estranged and embittered ex-wife, in the Sci Fi Channel's miniseries The Triangle. She also played the romantic lead Katie in Darrell Roodt's film about rugby, Number 10.

In 2005 Esra played the lead role of Caz O’Donough, an undercover police officer, in the gritty South African psychological thriller / police drama Snitch. Caz is a 20-year-old single mother, finding out that the father of her daughter, Lawrence Carter, is a member of a mafia-style crime family that her "tough cop" father Chisel, has been trying to bring down.

She appeared in Tim Greene's multiple South African Film & Television Award-winning newsroom drama Hard Copy, as the ambitious investigative journalist Kim Smollen. Kim is a Jewish girl in her mid-20s who started working as the entertainment reporter at the hard edged newspaper The Bulletin. In the third season Kim is given the opportunity for "serious" reporting, at the now re-invented sleazy tabloid The Bullet.

Between 2021 and 2023, she has starred in two seasons as Samantha Hugo in the South African crime drama series Lioness.

== Filmography ==
=== Films ===
Year	Title	Role	Notes
2000	I Dreamed of Africa	Siri	American film
2006	Number 10	Katie	
2007	Salaam-e-Ishq	Stephanie	Indian Hindi-language film
2011	2ND Take	'Movie' Lindsey	
2015	The Gamechangers	Jen Kolbe	BBC docudrama
2021	The Ground Under	Jessica 'Jess' Stuckman	
2023	Do Your Worst	Sondra	

=== Television ===
Year	Title	Role	Notes
2003	Yizo Yizo 3	Robbery Daughter	
2004	Isidingo	Yvette Meyer	
2004	Snitch	Caz O’Donough	
2005	The Triangle	Sally	TV miniseries, Sci Fi Channel
2006–2007	Hard Copy	Kim Smollen	TV series, season 2, 3
2007–2008	Life Is Wild	Lauren	Recurring, on The CW series
2008	Wild at Heart	Angie	Season 3
2008	The Lab	Samantha Mazur	Season 2
2010	Miss Behave	Rachel	
2015–2017	Isidingo	Angelique Scott	
2017–2021	The Queen	Sandra Stein	Season 2 - 6
2018–2022	The River	Sandra Stein	Season 1 - 5
2019	The Throne	Sandra Stein	Season 1
2020 - 2021	Gomora	Sandra Stein	Season 1 - 2
2021 - 2022	Legacy	Sandra Stein	Season 1 - 2
2020	Still Breathing	Candice Burton	
2021–present	Lioness	Samatha Hugo	Main role

== Personal life ==
Esra lives in Sandton with her parents and younger brother. She is a "closet fan" of competitive ping-pong competitions.
