= WRTR =

- Brookwood, Alabama; United States
- Broadcast area: Tuscaloosa metropolitan area
- Frequency: 105.9 MHz
- Branding: Talk Radio 105.9

Programming
- Format: Conservative talk
- Affiliations: Fox News Radio; Premiere Networks

Ownership
- Owner: iHeartMedia, Inc.; (iHM Licenses, LLC)
- Sister stations: WACT, WTXT, WZBQ

History
- First air date: June 1, 1966
- Former call signs: WACT-FM (1966–1997)
- Former frequencies: 105.5 MHz (1966–2005)
- Call sign meaning: "Roll Tide Roll"

Technical information
- Licensing authority: FCC
- Facility ID: 48645
- Class: C3
- ERP: 25,000 watts
- HAAT: 82 meters (269 ft)
- Transmitter coordinates: 33°14′17″N 87°29′06″W

Links
- Public license information: Public file; LMS
- Webcast: Listen live (via iHeartRadio)
- Website: talkradio1059.iheart.com

WRTR (105.9 FM, "Talk Radio 105.9") is a commercial radio station licensed to Brookwood, Alabama, United States, and serving the Tuscaloosa metropolitan area. Owned by iHeartMedia, Inc. via iHM Licenses, LLC., it features a conservative talk format. Studios are located on 11th Street in Downtown Tuscaloosa.

WRTR's transmitter is located on Hammer Avenue in Holt, Alabama.

== History ==
The station signed on the air on June 1, 1966, as WACT-FM, the sister station to WACT 1420 AM. Its city of license was Tuscaloosa and it broadcast at 105.5 MHz. It was only powered at 1,500 watts, a fraction of its current output.

At first, WACT-FM mostly simulcast the AM station's country music format. It later started airing its own automated country sound. While WACT 1420 AM was a full-service country station, with news, sports and DJs, WACT-FM concentrated on more music and less chatter.

The station changed to the current WRTR on March 31, 1997. The call letters stand for "Roll Tide Roll", which refers to the Crimson Tide, the nickname for University of Alabama sports teams. WRTR played album rock and was known as "Tuscaloosa's Rock Station." In mornings, it carried The Bob and Tom Show, based in Indianapolis. Popular DJ Joe Elvis hosted afternoon drive time beginning in 2002. The Wild Bill Show was heard every weeknight.

Former logo

In 2000, WRTR and WACT were acquired by San Antonio-based Clear Channel Communications, a forerunner to current owner iHeartMedia. On May 4, 2009, WRTR changed its format to all-talk, simulcasting WACT 1420. The two stations were branded as "Talk Radio 105.9". Then in October 2012, WACT 1420 flipped to comedy radio. That left WRTR 105.9 as an FM talk station, no longer simulcast with 1420 AM.

== Programming ==
WRTR's schedule consists of nationally syndicated conservative talk shows, with a simulcast of Jeff Tyson's morning show from WERC-FM in Birmingham.
