= The Road Home (upcoming film) =

- Directed by: Bill Condon
- Written by: Michael Bronner
- Story by: Michael Bronner; Zakes Mda
- Produced by: Laura Bickford; Michael Bronner; Anant Singh; Greg Yolen
- Starring: Thabo Rametsi; Cynthia Erivo; Guy Pearce; Johnny Flynn; John Legend
- Production company: StudioCanal
- Budget: $25 million

The Road Home is an upcoming biographical drama film directed by Bill Condon.

== Premise ==
Exiled from his native South Africa, trumpeter Hugh Masekela (Rametsi) is pulled between two worlds when the Anti-Apartheid Movement, led by his mentor fierce anti-apartheid advocate Archbishop Trevor Huddleston (Pearce), launches a boycott against Hugh’s friend Paul Simon, over his township music-inspired album “Graceland”, accusing Simon of violating the United Nations’ Cultural Boycott. Splitting from his mentor, Masekela, who sees music as a powerful weapon in the struggle, joins forces with fellow exile and lifelong collaborator, powerhouse vocalist Miriam ‘Mama Africa’ Makeba (Erivo), to create the Graceland band – a super group designed to bring South Africa’s voice to the world. Featuring the exhilarating music of Masekela, Makeba, and Paul Simon, this is a story of defiance, sacrifice, and the resilience of the human spirit.

== Cast ==
- Thabo Rametsi as Hugh Masekela
- Cynthia Erivo as Miriam Makeba
- Guy Pearce as Trevor Huddleston
- Johnny Flynn as Paul Simon
- John Legend as Harry Belafonte

== Production ==
Bill Condon was announced to be directing The Road Home in April 2026, with Thabo Rametsi, Cynthia Erivo, and Guy Pearce to star. Johnny Flynn joined the cast in May, with John Legend joining in July.

Production began in South Africa in July 2026.
