= Nokuthula Mavuso =

South African actress

Nokuthula Ledwaba
- Born: Nokuthula Ledwaba; 1982 (age 43–44); Soweto, South Africa
- Occupation: Actress
- Years active: 2002–present
- Children: 2
- Parents: Mavuso (father); Grace Vilakazi Ledwaba (mother)

Nokuthula Ledwaba Mavuso (born 1982) is a South African actress. She is best known for her roles in the popular serials Rhythm City and The River.

== Personal life ==
She was born in 1982 in Mofolo area in Soweto, South Africa. Her mother gave birth to her at a very young age. Her father latest died 33 years ago when her mother was still pregnant. Having had children at a young age, her mother had a difficult time raising them. Therefore, she handed her over to her aunt. Then she grew up in Soshanguve, Northern Pretoria with her aunt. After becoming a teen girl, she got to know about her family as well as her father named Mavuso. Then she went to see her mother and lived with her. However, her mother died in September 2015.

== Career ==
She began her career at the age of nineteen where she did a lot of children's and educational theatre productions that toured South Africa and the UK. Her first role was in the show Wild Child Lu. Then she acted in the popular television serials Rhythm City in 2007 where she played the popular role of 'Tshidi Khuse'. In 2009, she was nominated as the Best Supporting Actress during the 3rd South African Film and Television Awards (SAFTAs).

In 2018, she was invited to act in the television series The River. In the series, she played the role of 'Angelina' and continued to play the role in first and second seasons of the show. Apart from these popular television serials, she has acted in the series Abomama as 'Mapule' and on Ambitions as 'Thembi'. She also played supportive roles in the serials Hard Copy, Backstage, Umlilo and Scandal!. In the remake of original 1977 version of American mini-series Roots, Nokuthula played a lead role as 'Kunta Kinte's mother'.

In the e.tv drama series Umlilo, she starred the role as 'Dumile', a city girl born and raised in Soweto who is the second wife in a polygamous marriage.

== Filmography ==
- Hard Copy as Leah Gumede
- Umlilo as Dumile Simelane / Dumile
- Roots as Binta Kinte
- Mandela: Long Walk to Freedom as Courthouse Young Woman
- Mary and Martha as Micaela
- Rhythm City as Tshidi Khuse
- The River as Angelina
- Abomama as Mapule
- Ambitions as Thembi
- Reyka as Portia
- Lioness as Amo Twala
