= Fiona Ramsay =

South African actress and speaker

- Born: Fiona Ramsay; Johannesburg, South Africa
- Education: St Mary's school
- Alma mater: University of Cape Town
- Occupations: Actress, Voice over artist, MC, Speaker
- Years active: 1991–present

Fiona Ramsay is a South African actress, voice over artist, MC and speaker. Ramsay is best known for the roles in the television serials such as; Black Sails, Hard Copy, Heartlines and Scandal!. Apart from that, she is also a vocal consultant, dialogue coach and motivational speaker on Communication Skills and Development.

== Personal life ==
Ramsay was born in Johannesburg, South Africa. She went to St Mary's school. She graduated from the University of Cape Town (UCT). She is also a lecturer at the University of the Witwatersrand.

== Career ==
After graduated from UCT, she founded the Troupe Theatre Company. Through the company, she involved in many theatre productions across the country such as: East and Total Eclipse. Then she performed in the plays Going To St Ives, The Real Thing, Summit Conference, The Book Club, My Brilliant Divorce, Ladies & Gentleman and Shakespeare and Honour. In 2005, she directed the tribute play Barney's Women to commemorate the former Artistic Director and founder of the Market Theatre. Then in 2006, she directed the theatre musical play Gugu Mzimba - The Spirit of Gerard Sekoto which received critics acclaim.

Later she received the Durban award for Best Director for her stage play Nunsense. Meanwhile, she moved to United Kingdom and performed in the plays such as: Arcadia produced by Tom Stoppard for the Royal National Theatre with the role "Lady Croom & Hannah" and then played the role "Lady Macbeth" in the Shakespearean play Macbeth. During this period, she got the opportunity to appear in UK television, where she played the role of "villain" in the serial Supply And Demand, as "a teacher" in Element Of Doubt and as a "tough magistrate" in The Bill.

As a radio artist, she hosted the radio arts programs such as; Art Of The Matter & Cultural Exchange and the literature program Between The Covers on SAfm. Apart from that, she founded the Speakeasy Vocal Academy where she teaches vocal empowerment training in business, corporate and the arts sectors. Then she worked as a dialect coach American actors like Tim Robbins and Derek Luke for a film shot in South Africa. In the meantime, she joined with many international film ventures such as: Borderline, Country Of My Skull, Stander, Red Dust and Catch A Fire.

In South African television, she acted as the "Dorothy Wilcox" in SABC3 drama Hard Copy in 2005. She continued to play the role in all three seasons of the show. In 2006, she made a supportive role of "Andrea Bland" in the SABC2 education anthology series Heartlines. In 2010, she joined with the SABC2 drama series The Mating Game and played the role of "Veronica". Other than them, she also appeared in the serials: Hapgood, Stolen Lives, Arende III, Sterk Skemer and Sorted. In 2013, she played the role of "Helen" in the e.tv soap opera Scandal!. Then in 2014, she joined with the international mystery thriller serial Black Sails to play the role "Mrs. Mapleton". She played the role in the first four seasons of the show. In the meantime, she also appeared in the fourth season of Showtime thriller Homeland with the role "Dr. Helen Byatt".

In the preceding years, she appeared in many television serials including; Abo Mzala, The Mayor, It's OK We're Family, Taryn & Sharon, Diamond City and Queen Sono. In 2021, she joined with three serials: as "Denise" in season two of M-Net telenovela Legacy, as "Charlotte Lawson" in M-Net miniseries Lioness and as "Cathleen Tyrone" in another M-Net thriller Reyka.

== Filmography ==
| Year | Film | Role | Genre | Ref. |
|---|---|---|---|---|
| 1999 | Sterk Skemer | Ellen | TV series | |
| 2005 | Sorted | Fiona Ramsay | TV series | |
| 2005 | Hard Copy | Dorothy Wilcox | TV series | |
| 2006 | Heartlines | Andrea Bland | TV series | |
| 2008 | Jacob's Cross | Terry Taylor | TV series | |
| | Scandal! | Helen | TV series | |
| 2010 | The Mating Game | Veronica | TV series | |
| 2014 | Black Sails | Mrs. Mapleton | TV series | |
| 2014 | Dominion | Senator Romero | TV series | |
| 2014 | Homeland | Dr. Helen Byatt | TV series | |
| 2015 | Abo Mzala | Rachel | TV series | |
| 2015 | The Mayor | Lucinda le Roux | TV series | |
| 2015 | The Gamechangers | Patricia Thompson | Movie | |
| 2017 | It's OK We're Family | Fiona Ramsay | TV series | |
| 2017 | Taryn & Sharon | Sandy | TV series | |
| 2018 | Diamond City | Moeder | TV series | |
| 2018 | Maze Runner: The Death Cure | Board Member | Film | |
| 2018 | Table Manners | Annette | Film | |
| 2020 | Queen Sono | Guest role | TV series | |
| 2020 | Bulletproof 2 | Pernilla | Film | |
| 2021 | The Watch | Jocasta Wiggs | TV series | |
| 2021 | Legacy | Denise | TV series | |
| 2021 | Lioness | Charlotte Lawson | TV series | |
| 2021 | Reyka | Cathleen Tyrone | TV series | |
