= WACT =

- Tuscaloosa, Alabama; United States
- Frequency: 1420 kHz (HD Radio)
- Branding: 96.9 My FM

Programming
- Format: Adult contemporary

Ownership
- Owner: iHeartMedia, Inc.; (iHM Licenses, LLC)
- Sister stations: WRTR, WTXT, WZBQ

History
- First air date: September 1958
- Former call signs: WACT (1958–2008); WENN (2008–2009)
- Call sign meaning: Alabama Crimson Tide

Technical information
- Licensing authority: FCC
- Facility ID: 48643
- Class: D
- Power: 5,000 watts (day); 108 watts (night)
- Transmitter coordinates: 33°10′30″N 87°33′18″W
- Translator: 96.9 W245BR (Tuscaloosa)

Links
- Public license information: Public file; LMS
- Webcast: Listen live (via iHeartRadio)
- Website: 969myfm.iheart.com

WACT (1420 AM, "96.9 My FM") is a commercial radio station licensed to Tuscaloosa, Alabama, United States. The station, founded in 1958, is currently owned by iHeartMedia, Inc. and the license is held by iHM Licenses, LLC.

== History ==
WACT signed on the air in 1958 as an AM only, but in 1964 added 105.5 WACT FM. Clyde Price founded the stations under New South Radio, Inc. He owned and worked on-air WACT until his retirement in 1993. He was relieved as morning man by his oldest son Wally Price, who has been a personality in Tuscaloosa radio since the early 1970s. Price began his career at WKUL in Cullman, AL. He graduated from the University of Alabama School of Communication in 1952. WACT AM/FM was family-owned for forty years.

Known as WACT for 50 years from September 1958 to September 2008, the station was assigned the call letters WENN by the Federal Communications Commission on September 18, 2008. The station aired a sports format as "1420 The Tusk".

The WACT callsign was restored on February 25, 2009. This change accompanied a change to a news/talk format and rebranding as "News Radio 1420".

On October 29, 2012 WACT changed their format to comedy, branded as "Comedy 1420".

On August 11, 2014 WACT changed their format to urban gospel, branded as "Hallelujah 1420".

In March 2015 WACT changed their format to adult contemporary, branded as "96.9 My FM" (simulcast on FM translator W245BR 96.9 FM Tuscaloosa).

== Programming ==
WACT broadcasts an adult contemporary format. WACT also broadcasts games of the Atlanta Braves, from that Major League Baseball team's region-wide radio network.

Notable former weekday programs included a local morning show hosted by Steve Shannon and Leah Brandon as well as a regional afternoon talk show hosted by Dominick Brascia. Syndicated programming on WACT once included shows hosted by Rick and Bubba, Michael Savage, Clark Howard, and Phil Hendrie.

On April 5, 2018, MYFM started airing nationally syndicated, The Kidd Kraddick Morning Show.
