= WZBQ =

Radio station in Carrollton–Tuscaloosa, Alabama

Coordinates: 33.219°N 88.096°W

- Carrollton, Alabama; United States
- Broadcast area: Tuscaloosa, Alabama; Columbus–Starkville, Mississippi
- Frequency: 94.1 MHz
- Branding: 94.1 ZBQ

Programming
- Format: Top 40 (CHR)
- Affiliations: Premiere Networks

Ownership
- Owner: iHeartMedia; (iHM Licenses, LLC)
- Sister stations: WACT, WRTR, WTXT

History
- First air date: February 1, 1970; 56 years ago
- Former call signs: WRAG-FM (CP, 1966–1970); WWAG (1969–1973); WAQT (1973–1990); WCKO (1990-1995)

Technical information
- Licensing authority: FCC
- Facility ID: 70264
- Class: C0
- ERP: 100,000 watts
- HAAT: 307 meters (1,007 ft)

Links
- Public license information: Public file; LMS
- Webcast: Listen Live
- Website: 941zbq.iheart.com

WZBQ (94.1 FM, "94.1 ZBQ") is a Top 40 (CHR) music formatted radio station licensed to Carrollton, Alabama, with studios located in Tuscaloosa. The station is owned by iHeartMedia.

WZBQ serves west-central Alabama and most of east-central Mississippi with an ERP of 98,000 Watts, broadcasting at 94.1 MHz. The station was formerly the Tuscaloosa FM affiliate of the Alabama Crimson Tide football network. Cities in WZBQ's primary coverage area include Tuscaloosa, Carrollton, Aliceville and Fayette in Alabama and Columbus and Starkville in Mississippi.

== History ==
The station signed on as WWAG on February 1, 1970. In 1973, the station changed call letters to WAQT, then in 1990 to WCKO. The station took the oldies format and call letters of Z-102 (102.5 FM) in Jasper when that station began targeting the Birmingham market in 1987. In 1988, the station switched formats and adopted its current Top 40 programming. The very popular nationally syndicated morning show "Steve & DC" became partners at WZBQ-FM in the late 1980s. They were later syndicated to WZBQ from their base in St. Louis, Mo. Popular Birmingham DJ Coyote J Calhoun (WERC 1974-1979) was hired from WQUE FM New Orleans to do 7pm to 12 midnight.
