= Professionals (TV series) =

2020 action series

- Original poster
- Genre: Action
- Based on: Soldiers of Fortune
- Developed by: Jeff Most & Michael Colleary
- Starring: Tom Welling; Brendan Fraser; Elena Anaya; Ken Duken; Lisa Loven Kongsli; August Wittgenstein; Saïd Taghmaoui
- Music by: Kormac
- Countries of origin: South Africa; Ireland
- Original language: English
- No. of seasons: 1
- No. of episodes: 10

Production
- Executive producers: Jeff Most; Michael Colleary; Tristan Orpen Lynch; Michael Auret; Howard Cohen; Eric d’Arbeloff; Jennifer Berman; Herbert L. Kloiber; Thomas Augsberger; Cosima von Spreti; Daniel Wagner; Maxim Korostyshevsky; Bharat Nalluri; Fredrik Ljungberg; Brendan Fraser; Tom Welling; Elena Anaya
- Producers: Katy Most; Lwazi Manzi; Aoife O'Sullivan
- Cinematography: Tom Marais; David Johnson; Michael Swan
- Editors: Danny Saphire; Nicholas Costaras; Jeremy Briers; Carmen Freemantle
- Camera setup: Single-camera
- Running time: 48 minutes
- Production companies: Most Media; Subotica; Spier Films; Roadside Attractions; Jeff Most Productions; High Bridge Production; Leonine Holding; Viaplay

Original release
- Network: Viaplay
- Release: 23 November – 21 December 2020

Professionals is an action television series starring Tom Welling and Brendan Fraser. It is an international production and is based on the 2012 film Soldiers of Fortune. The first season was commissioned by Viaplay. A second season is planned, with the showrunners looking for a new network to pick up the show.

== Premise ==
The series follows Captain Vincent Corbo, a mercenary and former intelligence officer, who is hired by billionaire futurist Peter Swann and his medical visionary fiancee Grace Davila to investigate the suspected sabotage of his advanced medical satellite. Corbo along with his team of security professionals discovers a conspiracy involving corporate rivals, corrupt government officials, and a shadowy crime syndicate to destroy Swann and take control of his tech business.

== Cast and characters ==
- Tom Welling as Vincent Corbo, a mercenary and former intelligence officer
- Brendan Fraser as Peter Swann, a billionaire futurist controlling a large tech empire who hires Corbo
- Elena Anaya as Graciela "Grace" Davila, a visionary medical expert and fiancee of Swann
- Ken Duken as Kurt Neumann, a rogue Europol agent with a vendetta against Corbo
- Saïd Taghmaoui as Tarik Basari
- Lisa Loven Kongsli as Zora Swann
- August Wittgenstein as Luther Bruhn
- Tanya van Graan as Romy Brandt
- Danielle Ryan as Sophia Elias
- Kai Luke Brümmer as Danny Corbo
- Stevel Marc as Tyler "Trig" Raines
- Nic Rasenti as Jack "Hacksaw" Smythe
- Jazzara Jaslyn as Jane Swann

== Episodes ==
No.	Title	Directed by	Written by	Original release date
1	"Snipe Hunt"	Bharat Nalluri	Story by : Jeff Most & Michael Colleary; Teleplay by : Michael Colleary	23 November 2020
2	"Entanglements"	Bharat Nalluri	Michael Colleary	23 November 2020
3	"The Knives of Friends"	Bharat Nalluri	Michael Colleary	30 November 2020
4	"Vectors"	Thabang Moleya	Christian O'Reilly	30 November 2020
5	"Process of Elimination"	Thabang Moleya	Paul Walker	7 December 2020
6	"Hot Zone"	Oliver Schmitz	Rohan Dickson	7 December 2020
7	"The Hunted"	Oliver Schmitz	Rohan Dickson	14 December 2020
8	"The Alamo"	Oliver Schmitz	Rohan Dickson	14 December 2020
9	"Deep Fake"	Ciaran Donnelly	Rohan Dickson	21 December 2020
10	"Swan Song"	Ciaran Donnelly	Paul Walker	21 December 2020

== Production ==
The series was created by Jeff Most and Michael Colleary, and is loosely based on the 2012 film Soldiers of Fortune. Each season is intended to star Tom Welling as Vincent Corbo protecting a new client, with the first season's client being Peter Swann who is portrayed by Brendan Fraser.

The first season was commissioned by Viaplay who announced it in May 2019, and was co-produced by Most Media, Subotica, Spier Films Production, Roadside Attractions, Jeff Most Productions, Highbridge Production, Leonine Holding (then Tele München Group) and Viaplay.

The series began filming in late May 2019 in South Africa and Ireland under Leonine Holding and wrapped up in September 2020. It was released on 23 November 2020.

The first season was acquired by The CW for broadcasting in the United States, but it passed on renewing the show for a second season. The showrunners have stated that they are looking for another outlet to pick up the show.

== International broadcast ==
The series was acquired for broadcast in the United States in September 2021 by The CW and premiered on 11 October 2022 and ended in December 2022. The show was quietly cancelled in June 2023 due to low ratings and a shift in the network's strategy amongst its acquisition by Nexstar. Nexstar has stated that they will greenlight more unscripted productions going forward into the future. Jeff Most responded to the cancellation saying that he's hopeful that another network will pickup the series, and that they're currently working on the second season and are pitching the series to other networks and shopping it around.
