= WTXT =

Coordinates: 33.3215°N 87.7747°W

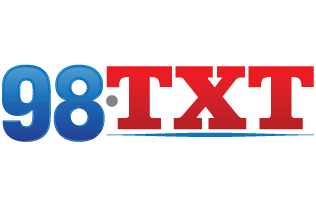
- Fayette, Alabama; United States
- Broadcast area: Tuscaloosa metropolitan area
- Frequency: 98.1 MHz (HD Radio)
- Branding: 98 TXT

Programming
- Format: Country
- Subchannels: HD2: 92.1 The Possum (Classic Country); HD3: 96.1 The Blessing (Southern Gospel)
- Affiliations: Premiere Networks

Ownership
- Owner: iHeartMedia, Inc.; (iHM Licenses, LLC)
- Sister stations: WACT, WRTR, WZBQ

History
- First air date: January 29, 1977
- Former call signs: WVEL (CP, 1972–1977); WHKW (1977–1989)

Technical information
- Licensing authority: FCC
- Facility ID: 68418
- Class: C1
- ERP: 100,000 watts
- HAAT: 274 meters (899 ft)
- Translators: HD2: 92.1 W221DB (Tuscaloosa); HD3: 96.1 W241BT (Tuscaloosa)

Links
- Public license information: Public file; LMS
- Webcast: Listen live (via iHeartRadio)
- Website: 98txt.iheart.com; www.thepossum.com (HD2); 961theblessing.com (HD3)

WTXT (98.1 FM, "98 TXT") is a commercial radio station licensed to Fayette, Alabama, and serving the Tuscaloosa metropolitan area and west-central Alabama. It airs a country music format and is owned by iHeartMedia, Inc. The studios and offices are on 11th Avenue, off Interstate 359 in Tuscaloosa.

WTXT is a Class C1 station. It has an effective radiated power (ERP) of 100,000 watts, the maximum for most FM stations. The transmitter is off Boyd Road near Columbus Creek in Echola. WTXT broadcasts using HD Radio technology. Its HD2 subchannel airs a classic country format known as "The Possum." The HD3 subchannel plays Southern gospel music. They feed FM translators at 92.1 MHz and 96.1 MHz respectively.

== History ==
In the early 1970s, broadcaster Harlon Kenneth Watts sought to build a new FM station in Fayette and applied for a construction permit from the Federal Communications Commission (FCC). While it was still under construction, it was given the call sign WVEL. It signed on the air on January 29, 1977. It used the call letters WHKW, representing Watts' initials.

During the 1980s, the format was Top 40 hits. Watts served as the president and general manager. WHKW was Tuscaloosa's affiliate for the Rick Dees Weekly Top 40. The station's Top 40 format lasted more than a decade.

In the early 1990s, the call sign changed to WTXT and a country music format was adopted. In August 2000, the station was acquired by San Antonio-based Clear Channel Communications, a forerunner to today's iHeartMedia.

In 2006, WTXT added the Big D and Bubba morning show from WYNK-FM in Baton Rouge. The station also had Wild Bill Seckbach hosting afternoons. In 2014, The Bobby Bones Show from Nashville was added to the lineup, replacing Big D and Bubba.

On April 27, 2011, following severe weather known as the 2011 Super Outbreak, WTXT's 860 foot (260 m) broadcast tower in Echola was destroyed. That forced the station to broadcast with a reduced signal. In the Fall of 2012, WTXT returned to full-power from a new tower at the same site.

WTXT's primary coverage area includes Tuscaloosa, Fayette, and Aliceville in Alabama and Columbus, Starkville and West Point in Mississippi. The station's signal extends into the western suburbs of Birmingham (e.g., Bessemer, Fairfield, Hueytown).

== Previous logos ==
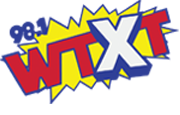
