= Jimmy Lee Sudduth =

American painter and musician (1910–2007)

- Born: March 10, 1910; Caines Ridge, Alabama
- Died: September 2, 2007 (aged 97); Fayette, Alabama
- Known for: Painting
- Movement: Modern Art
- Awards: 2005 Alabama Governor's Award

Jimmy Lee Sudduth (March 10, 1910 – September 2, 2007) was a prominent artist and blues musician from Fayette, Alabama, U.S.

== Biography ==
=== Early life ===
Jimmy Lee Sudduth was born on March 10, 1910. He was raised on a farm at Caines Ridge, near Fayette, Alabama. He began making art as a child, surrounding the porch of his parents' house with hand-carved wooden dolls and drawing in the dirt or on tree trunks outside. As his talents became known in the community he began collecting pigments from earth, rocks plants, foodstuffs, and industrial products for use in his finger paintings. He used his fingers because "they never wore out." His numerous works were typically executed on found surfaces such as plywood, doors, and boards from demolished buildings. He experimented with mixing his pigments with various binders to make them adhere better, including syrup, sugar, soft drinks, and caulk.

=== Career ===
His first public art exhibition was held in 1968 at Stillman College in Tuscaloosa. A 1971 exhibition in his hometown of Fayette earned regional attention and, beginning that year, he became a featured artist at the annual Kentuck Festival of the Arts in Northport, Alabama. In 1976, he was invited to play harmonica and exhibit some of his paintings at the Smithsonian Institution's Bicentennial Festival of American Folk Life. He appeared on the Today Show and 60 Minutes in 1980. He was honored with the Alabama Arts Award in 1995 and served as an artist-in-residence at the New Orleans Museum of Art. His work is featured in many collections, including the Smithsonian American Art Museum, the High Museum of Art, the Pérez Art Museum Miami, the Corcoran Gallery, the Speed Art Museum, the Birmingham Museum of Art and the House of Blues.

He was one of the early masters of southern art. He was an active member of his community, and his work, though idiosyncratic, is firmly grounded in the African American culture of the rural South. He drew his subject matter from the world around him: people he knew (and celebrities), architecture, farm scenes, machinery, flowers, and animals of the woods and barnyard. Very rarely, he portrayed a religious figure such as Christ, Moses, or John the Baptist.

Although it is commonly believed that Sudduth's early paintings were executed exclusively in mud and found pigments, such as motor oil or plant juices, in fact, his earliest known paintings contain large amounts of house paint. As his fame grew, dealers advised Sudduth on ways to make his works more permanent and more colorful, and by the 1990s, no longer able to collect his own materials, he began using commercially sold acrylic paints, applied with sponge brushes onto wood panels prepared with a flat black ground.

=== Death ===
Having resisted leaving his home as long as he could, Sudduth spent his last year at the Fayette Nursing Home. He died at the Fayette Medical Center on September 2, 2007, at the age of 97.

== Exhibitions (selection) ==
- Montgomery Museum of Fine Arts, Montgomery, Alabama. Jan 15 - Mar 27, 2005, curated by Susan Mitchell Crawley
- What Carried Us Over: Gifts from the Gordon W. Bailey Collection. Sep 13, 2019 - Apr 19, 2020. Pérez Art Museum Miami, FL.
- "Self-Made: A Century of Inventing Artists". American Folk Art Museum. April 10, 2026–September 13, 2026
