= Jazzara Jaslyn =

South African actress

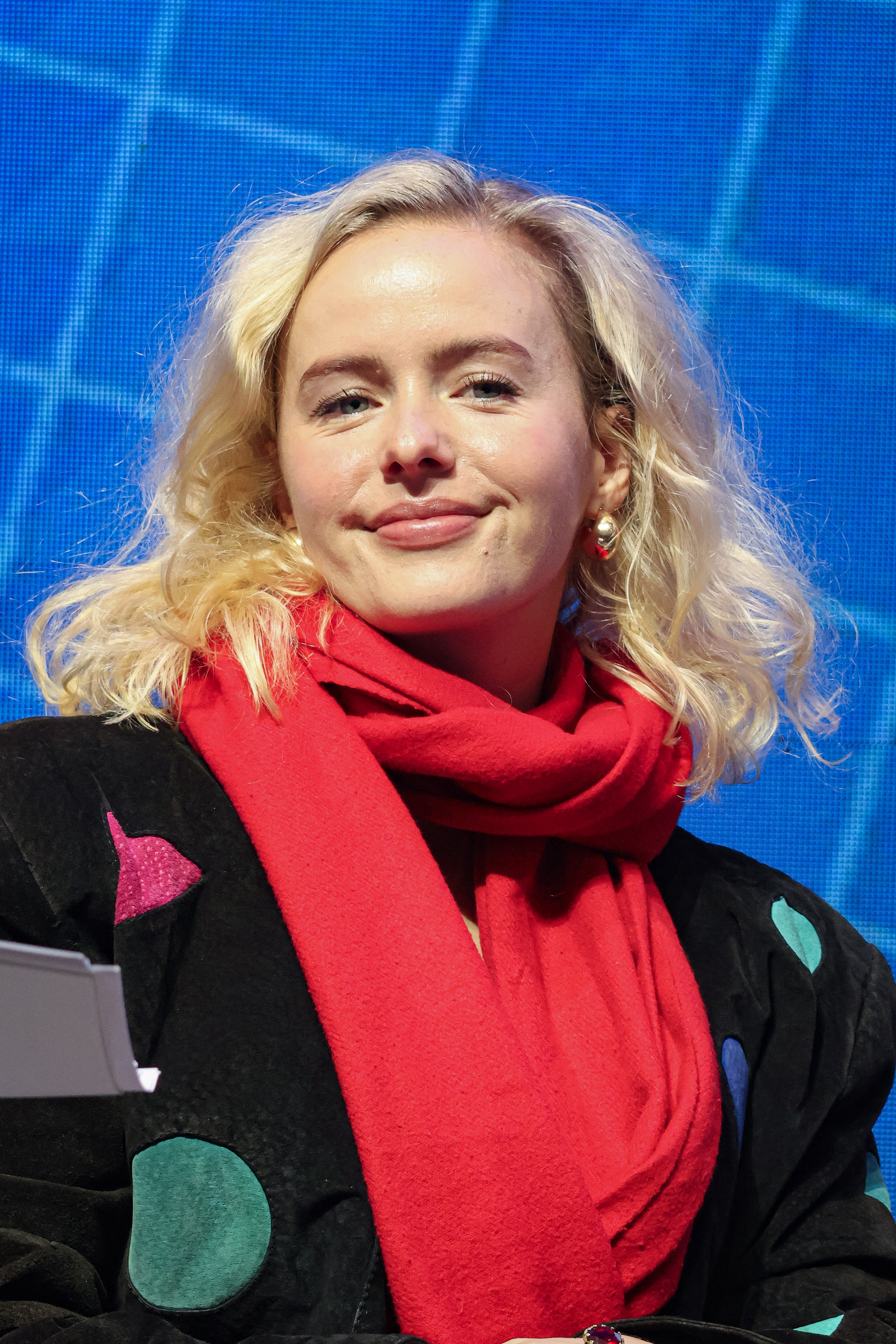
- Jaslyn in 2026
- Born: 8 November 1991 (age 34); Cape Town, South Africa
- Other name: Jazzara Pienaar
- Education: University of Cape Town
- Years active: 2010–present

Jazzara Pienaar (born 8 November 1991), also known as Jazzara Jaslyn, is a South African actress. On television, she is known for her roles in the M-Net series League of Glory (2010) and Lioness (2021–2023), the Viaplay series Professionals (2020), the Max series Warrior (2023) and the Netflix series One Piece (2026).

== Early life ==
Jaslyn was born in Cape Town, South Africa. She became interested in acting due to her mother taking her to a children's show. She initially intended to become an archaeologist before pursuing acting professionally. She graduated from the University of Cape Town with a Bachelor of Arts (BA) Honours in Theatre and Performance.

== Career ==
One of her earliest roles was playing Olympia in the musical teen film A Cinderella Story: If the Shoe Fits She had a recurring role on the action series Professionals portraying Jane Swann. She had a main role as Miranda Hugo in the M-Net crime drama series Lioness. She portrayed Eliza Pendleton in season 3 of the martial arts crime series Warrior. She played the antogonist Miss Valentine in the Netflix series One Piece. Outside of acting Jaslyn is also a director and her debut short film A Knowing received nine international awards. She followed this up with another film called Strange Dance released in 2026.

== Filmography ==
=== Film ===
Year	Title	Role	Notes
2014	Keys, Money, Phone	Alison	Short
2016	A Cinderella Story: If the Shoe Fits	Olympia	
2018	Nobody Dies	Jogging Mom	
2019	This Country Is Lonely	Artist	Short
2023	Girl You Know It's True	Charlene	
2024	A Family Affair	Jessica	Short
2024	A Knowing	Aella	Short
2025	London Calling	Darya	

=== Television ===
Year	Title	Role	Notes
2010	League of Glory	Alison Grant	11 episodes
2017	Origins: The Journey of Humankind	Bar Maid Daphne	Episode: "The Power of Money"
2018	Castle & Castle	Jessica	Episode: "#1.1"
2018	Welcome to Murdertown	Shelly Nagel	Episode: "Buried Deep"
2020–2022	Professionals	Jane Swann	10 episodes
2021–2023	Lioness	Miranda Hugo	11 episodes
2023	FDR	Alice Roosevelt	Episode: "Nothing to Fear"
2023	Warrior	Eliza Pendleton	5 episodes
2026	One Piece	Miss Valentine	4 episodes
