= Curt Porter =

American football player (born 1988)

No. 77
- Position: Offensive tackle / guard

Personal information
- Born: July 11, 1988 (age 38); Fayette, Alabama
- Listed height: 6 ft 7 in (2.01 m)
- Listed weight: 290 lb (132 kg)

Career information
- College: Jacksonville State
- NFL draft: 2011: undrafted

Career history
- Denver Broncos (2011)*
- * Offseason or practice squad member only

Awards and highlights
- All-OVC 2nd Team (2009); All-OVC 1st Team (2010)
- Stats at Pro Football Reference

Curt Porter (born July 11, 1988, in Fayette, Alabama) was an American football guard in the National Football League for the Denver Broncos. He played college football at Jacksonville State, where he was named first-team all-American for the NCAA Division I Football Championship Subdivision by the Associated Press.

In high school Porter played for head coach Waldon Tucker.
