= Salaam-e-Ishq =

2007 Indian film by Nikkhil Advani

- Directed by: Nikhil Advani
- Screenplay by: Nikhil Advani; Saurabh Shukla; Suresh Nair
- Dialogues by: Rahul Awate
- Story by: Nikhil Advani
- Produced by: Mukesh Talreja; Sunil Manchanda
- Starring: Anil Kapoor; Juhi Chawla; Govinda; Shannon Esra; Salman Khan; Priyanka Chopra; Akshaye Khanna; Ayesha Takia; John Abraham; Vidya Balan; Sohail Khan; Isha Koppikar
- Cinematography: Piyush Shah
- Edited by: Aarti Bajaj
- Music by: Shankar–Ehsaan–Loy
- Production companies: Eros International; MAD Entertainment; Orion Pictures
- Distributed by: Eros International
- Release date: 25 January 2007
- Running time: 224 minutes
- Country: India
- Language: Hindi
- Budget: ₹43 crore
- Box office: ₹52.24 crore

Salaam-e-Ishq (transl. Salute To Love) also known as Salaam-e-Ishq: A Tribute To Love, is a 2007 Indian Hindi-language romantic drama film directed by Nikkhil Advani, marking his second directorial venture after Kal Ho Naa Ho (2003). An unofficial remake of Love Actually (2003), the film features an ensemble cast of Anil Kapoor, Govinda, Salman Khan, Juhi Chawla, Akshaye Khanna, John Abraham, Priyanka Chopra, Vidya Balan, Ayesha Takia, Shannon Esra, Sohail Khan and Isha Koppikar. It weaves six love stories together and follows the relationships of the people within it.

Principal photography began in 2004 and concluded in 2006. The film was released on 25 January 2007 and became the first ever Hindi film to be screened digitally. It received mixed reviews from critics with praise towards the cast performances, but criticism for its length.

== Plot ==
=== Story 1: Rahul & Kamini ===
Born in Dehradun, temperamental and ambitious Kamna changes her name to Kamini Ranawat, hires Babu as her manager, and becomes one of the most sought-after heroines in Bollywood. As a publicity stunt to change her image from item queen and to get the attention of filmmaker Karan Johar, she says that she is in love with a man named Rahul. In London, a man saying that he is Rahul Saxena poses as her childhood sweetheart and future husband. Kamna has to play along or she will not get the film deal she was looking for with Johar. This results in a dilemma for her as Rahul reveals that he loved her back when she was Kamna, and she has to choose between her career and Rahul. Kamna initially chooses her career but soon realizes that she is in love with Rahul when she cannot stop thinking about him. Kamna turns down Johar's movie offer and hunts down Rahul at Gia Bakshi and Shiven Dungarpur's wedding, where she proposes to him. Rahul and Kamini accept their love for each other and reunite.

=== Story 2: Raju & Stephanie ===
Raju is a taxi driver who comes to the assistance of a white woman Stephanie, who is frantically trying to hunt down her lover Rohit Chaddha. While Raju drives her around all of Northern India searching for Rohit, he falls in love with her and drops her off to the venue where Rohit is getting ready to marry Gia. However, it turns out that Rohit does not want to marry Stephanie because he wants to marry an Indian girl and tells her to get lost. Raju slaps Rohit across the face and confesses his love for Stephanie. Stephanie confesses her love for Raju, and the couple unites.

=== Story 3: Gia & Shiven ===
Gia Bakshi lives with her father Col. Bakshi and is in love with Shiven. Both are to get married shortly, but Shiven starts to get cold feet thanks to a few misleading words about marriage from his friend Juggy. He decides to disappear from her life, leaving Bakshi with no alternative but to arrange Gia's marriage with Rohit Chaddha. However, Shiven remains heartbroken and cannot stop thinking about Gia. While driving one day, he accidentally hits Tehzeeb Hussain, who is walking on the road, and helps her reunite with Ashutosh Raina. As he sees the pair reunite, he realizes that he cannot let Gia go. He rushes to her wedding with Rohit and stops the wedding, professing his love for Gia. Shiven and Gia get married.

=== Story 4: Seema, Vinay, and Anjali ===
Gia's sister Seema, who lives in London, has been married to Vinay Malhotra for 15 years, and they have two children. Vinay sees his life as boring and dull until a woman named Anjali comes into his life. The two start to meet and begin an affair, but while preparing to travel to India for Gia's marriage, Seema finds out about Vinay's affair, leaving her heartbroken. Vinay is left to choose between Seema and Anjali. He chooses Seema and runs to the airport as she is leaving for India with their children. Vinay apologizes to Seema, and the couple reunites.

=== Story 5: Ashutosh & Tehzeeb ===
Ashutosh is a Hindu but falls in love and marries Tehzeeb, who is Muslim, much to the chagrin of his father, who will not have anything to do with him. Tehzeeb is a TV news reporter; while travelling on an inaugural train route, the train derails. Tehzeeb survives but loses her memory and is unable to recall who Ashutosh is – and may end up leaving him and returning to her parents' home. Ashutosh takes Tehzeeb to his parents' house where they first met so that Tehzeeb can restore her memories, but he must deal with his father in order to help her. Tehzeeb is overwhelmed and runs away. She is accidentally hit by Shiven's car. Shiven calls Ashutosh, and they bring Tehzeeb to Shiven's house to rest. When Tehzeeb wakes up, she wants to leave Ashutosh and go to her family's house because she is tired of seeing him sad when she is unable to remember who he is. Ashutosh tells her that even if she cannot remember their past, the couple can form new memories together. He also tells her that without her, he has no present or future and that whatever the future brings, the couple will be able to face together. Tehzeeb and Ashutosh then reunite and resume their life together. A few years later, they are back to being the loving couple that they were before Tehzeeb's accident.

=== Story 6: Ramdayal & Phoolwati ===
Ramdayal weds attractive Phoolwati and would like to spend some intimate moments with her, but comical circumstances prevent him from doing so. On the day they get married, Ram accidentally sets the room on fire, thus ruining his and Phoolwati's first night. One night, Ram gets kicked out of a brothel when five kids see him kissing Phoolwati. Ram and Phoolwati hide in a car but get injured when the car crashes into a house. Then, while travelling together on a train, they see the train getting inside a tunnel . During this time the interior of the train remains very dark. So they take advantage of this darkness and finally enjoy some romantic time together.

== Cast ==
- Anil Kapoor as Vinay Malhotra
- Juhi Chawla as Seema Bakshi Malhotra
- Govinda as Raju
- Shannon Esra as Stephanie
- Salman Khan as Rahul "Raul" Saxena
- Priyanka Chopra as Kamini "Kamna" Ranawat
- Akshaye Khanna as Shiven Dungarpur
- Ayesha Takia as Gia Bakshi
- John Abraham as Ashutosh "Ashu" Raina
- Vidya Balan as Tehzeeb Hussain Raina
- Sohail Khan as Ram Dayal
- Isha Koppikar as Phoolwati
- Anjana Sukhani as Anjali Kapoor
- Kushal Punjabi as Rohit Chaddha
- Vishal Malhotra as Juggy
- Kamini Khanna as Pammi, Rohit's mother
- Prem Chopra as Colonel Bakshi, Seema's father.
- Arun Bakshi as Satpal
- Mangala Kerke as Mrs. Bakshi, Seema's mother.
- Atul Parchure as Sukhi
- Saurabh Shukla as Dotcom Paaji
- Vrajesh Hirjee as Prem
- Manoj Pahwa as Mr. Chaddha
- Viju Khote as Amar
- Tinnu Anand as Babu
- K. K. Raina as Tehzeeb's father
- Anang Desai as Mr. Raina, Ashutosh's father
- Amitabh Bachchan as himself (special appearance)
- Karan Johar as himself (cameo appearance)

== Production ==
=== Development ===
Salaam-e-Ishq marks Nikhil Advani's second directorial venture. It was the unofficial remake of Hollywood film Love Actually. While the original had ten stories, the film had only six love stories. Vikram Phadnis worked for about two years and designed around 800 costumes for all the on-screen characters, from the actors to the background dancers.

=== Casting ===
The film featured an ensemble cast of Anil Kapoor, Juhi Chawla, Salman Khan, Priyanka Chopra, Akshaye Khanna, Ayesha Takia, John Abraham, Vidya Balan, Govinda, Shannon Esra, Sohail Khan and Isha Koppikar. The film marked Shannon Esra's Hindi film debut.

=== Filming ===
Principal photography began in 2004 and concluded in November 2006. Since the plot involves various interlinked stories, the film was shot in various Indian locations of Rishikesh, Delhi, Agra, Jaipur, and Hyderabad along with foreign locations such as London, Australia and Sri Lanka.

== Soundtrack ==
Salaam-e-Ishq: A Tribute To Love

Soundtrack album by Shankar–Ehsaan–Loy
- Released: 24 October 2006 (India)
- Genre: Film soundtrack
- Length: 39:47
- Label: T-Series
- Producer: Shankar–Ehsaan–Loy

Shankar–Ehsaan–Loy chronology
Marigold (2007)	Salaam-e-Ishq: A Tribute To Love (2006)	Johnny Gaddaar (2007)

The music of the film was released in 2006 at Grand Hyatt, Mumbai by T-Series. It features 7 songs composed by Shankar–Ehsaan–Loy with lyrics written by Sameer. This is the second film of Advani together with the trio. Their first venture Kal Ho Naa Ho (2003) had earned Shankar–Ehsaan–Loy the National Film Award for Best Music Direction. This soundtrack consisted of 7 tracks. The track "Babuji" from Aar Paar (1954) was remastered and used for the album.

Actor Akshaye Khanna who plays Shiven in the film commented on the music, saying, "Salaam-E-Ishq has the best music I have heard in the last 10 years. The album is outstanding. It is definitely Shankar-Ehsaan-Loy's best work till today. It has very unique sounds, and Sameer's lyrics are also fabulous. It is not the type which will become obsolete after a point of time. You will want to pull out its CD even after 15 years and listen to the music." Anil Kapoor, who plays Vinay, too echoed the same sentiments, saying the album was best to come out of Bollywood in a long time.

Track list
No.	Title	Singer(s)	Length
1.	"Dil Kya Kare"	Adnan Sami	5:27
2.	"Salaam-E-Ishq"	Sonu Nigam, Shreya Ghoshal, Kunal Ganjawala, Sadhana Sargam, Shankar Mahadevan	7:04
3.	"Mera Dil"	Shaan, Nihira Joshi	6:57
4.	"Tenu Leke"	Sonu Nigam, Mahalakshmi Iyer, Wajid Khan, Iqbal, Afzal	4:36
5.	"Saiyaan Re"	Shankar Mahadevan, Shilpa Rao, Loy Mendonsa	5:24
6.	"Babuji"	Nihira Joshi	3:23
7.	"Ya Rabba"	Kailash Kher	6:56
Total length:			39:47

=== Critical reception ===
Professional ratings
Review scores
Source	Rating
Bollywood Hungama	4/5 stars
Rediff.com	4.5/5 stars

The album was met with positive reviews from music critics. Sukanya Verma of Rediff in her 4.5 star review, remarked, "Salaam-e-Ishq is a well-designed, wholesome soundtrack with emphasis on melody, beat and innovation. Featuring 7 individual tracks, no sad versions or technically-damaged retakes. It is 7 out of 7! The musical trio succeed in getting the perfect score." Joginder Tuteja of Bollywood Hungama too gave the album a positive review, stating, "Each of the songs of Salaam-E-Ishq boasts of high quality music. There are some new sounds interspersed with the kind of music that goes well with the Bollywood scheme of things and the final result is something that is going to stay with you for many more months to come." Glamsham remarked, "The musical trio has infused different musical beats, style and concepts with élan in tracks in 'Dil Kya Kare' and 'Saiyaan Re' and has entertained with the title track. Hear it for different musical flavors and you will feel the versatility of this high-profile album and the musical flamboyance of the musical trio."

=== Charts and sales ===
According to the Indian trade website Box Office India, with around 16,50,000 units sold, this film's soundtrack album was the year's fourth highest-selling. Rediff.com called it a "delightful soundtrack helmed by the efficient troika of Shankar-Ehsaan-Loy." Filmfare added the title song in its list of "Top 5 star studded Hindi songs".

== Release ==
Salaam-e-Ishq was released on 25 January 2007. It became the first ever Hindi film to be screened digitally.

== Reception ==
=== Critical response ===
Salaam-e-Ishq received mixed reviews from critics. Sukanya Verma of Rediff.com noted, "Even if Advani's execution is a letdown, most of the cast its job really well. If only Salaam-E-Ishq had got its priority right. It is an ode to mediocrity, not love or cinema." Taran Adarsh of Bollywood Hungama gave 1.5 out of 5 stars and wrote, "It has one major ace - its massive star cast, which has translated into tremendous hype. But the deficiencies outweigh everything - disjointed script, abstract style of narrating the story and excessive length." Rajeev Masand noted, "Apart from its daunting length and those holes in the script, there’s much to enjoy in Advani’s film, including the cast's performances. But entertainment it delivers in reasonable doses."

Namrata Joshi of Outlook India gave 2 out of 5 stars and wrote, "Watching 3 hours and 40 minutes long film is like going to a typical North Indian wedding banquet with loads on the menu. But not one dish catches your fancy and you actually return home hungry." Khalid Mohamed of Hindustan Times gave 2 out of 5 stars and stated, "Possibly one of the most higgledy-piggledy written scripts in recent times, Advani’s compendium effort features a dozen odd characters whom you wish you never ever meet in a stuck elevator."

=== Box office ===
The film collected approximately ₹52.24 crore at the box-office, and was declared as a Box office Average .

== Awards and nominations ==
Stardust Awards

- Breakthrough Performance – Female - Anjana Sukhani
