= Lioness (South African TV series) =

- Created by: Ilse van Hemert
- Country of origin: South Africa
- Original language: English
- No. of seasons: 2
- No. of episodes: 20

Production
- Executive producers: Wikus du Toit; Jan du Plessis; Yolisa Phahle; Allan Sperling; Kaye Ann Williams
- Producer: Ilse Van Hemert
- Production company: Ochre Moving Pictures

Original release
- Network: M-Net
- Release: 28 January 2021 – present

Lioness is a South African crime drama television series created by Ilse van Hemert and developed by Ochre Moving Pictures. It premiered on 28 January 2021 on M-Net.

Lead actress Shannon Esra was nominated for Best Actress in a Television Drama at the 2022 South African Film and Television Awards. In December 2022, it was announced Lioness had been renewed for a second season, which premiered on 26 January 2023.

== Cast ==
=== Main ===
- Shannon Esra as Samantha Hugo
- Natasha Sutherland as Megan Hugo
- Gerald Steyn as Anton Marais
- Nokuthula Mavuso as Amo Twala
- Frank Rautenbach as Jason Hugo
- Jazzara Jaslyn as Miranda Hugo
- Jacques Bessenger as Adrian Hugo
- Terrence Ngwila as Sifiso Twala
- Avianah Abrahams as Caitlyn Hugo
  - Melania Camilla Niemand as Young Caitlyn
- Fiona Ramsay as Charlotte Lawson
- Joshua Eady as Liam Hugo
  - Caleb Payne as Young Liam
- Ilana Cilliers as Yvette Smith
- Evan Hengst as Brian Sutton

=== Recurring and guest ===
- Pulane Rampoana as Bonolo Mahlaba
- Jack Devnarain as Howard Chetty
- Paige Bonnin as Felicity
- Sanli Jooste as Emma Marais
- Ditebogo Ledwaba as Lesedi Twala
  - Kutlwano Sibekwane as Young Lesedi Twala
- Xolani Xaba as Scelo Twala
- Cynthia Makhubela as Mary
- Emily Mokhupi as Hlubi
- Sofia Cicoria as Lulu
- Jock Kleynhans as Jake
- Sammy T as Abe
- Joshua Crerar as Louis Marais
- Ashton Mitchell as Rory
- Moira McKie as Erica Sutton
- Jone-Lee Abrahams as Candy
- Carla Classen as Bianca Curtis

== Episodes ==
=== Series overview ===
Series	Episodes	Originally released	
Series	Episodes	First released	Last released
1	10	28 January 2021	1 April 2021
2	10	26 January 2023	30 March 2023

=== Season 1 (2021) ===
No. overall	No. in season	Title	Directed by	Written by	Original release date
1	1	"Episode 1"	Jozua Malherbe & Morné du Toit	Ilse van Hemert, Mitzi Booysen & Thomas Hall	28 January 2021
Forty-four-year old Samantha Hugo emerges from prison, determined to reunite with her long-lost children, 24-year-old Miranda, 21-year-old Liam, and 11-year-old Caitlyn, but her efforts are unexpectedly sabotaged. Eight years before, someone is spying on the Hugo family.
2	2	"Episode 2"	Jozua Malherbe & Morné du Toit	Ilse van Hemert, Mitzi Booysen & Thomas Hall	4 February 2021
Sam finds out the priority crimes unit is about to tear her family apart, forcing her to choose between love and her children. In the future, Sam is excited to hear Liam is returning from Cape Town, but their encounter has an unexpected outcome. Sam demands a meeting with Caitlyn, but behind the scenes, Megan is a puppet master at work to keep Caitlyn for herself.
3	3	"Episode 3"	Jozua Malherbe & Morné du Toit	Mitzi Booysen, Rosalind Butler & Trish Malone	11 February 2021
Sam gets shocking news about her missing husband, and she must face the music alone. When Sam follows Liam into the Jo'burg CBD, she discovers her son is in the clutches of a drug dealer, and she must rely on the skills she learned in prison to try and save him.
4	4	"Episode 4"	Jozua Malherbe & Morné du Toit	Mitzi Booysen, Rosalind Butler & Trish Malone	18 February 2021
Charlotte and Sam have a huge fight over something Charlotte had given the pesky tabloid journalist, and Jason makes a disturbing declaration. Sam ambushes her one-time lover but then sees something on the news that turns her world upside down.
5	5	"Episode 5"	Jozua Malherbe & Morné du Toit	Mitzi Booysen & Trish Malone	25 February 2021
Sam is on a mission to uncover the truth behind the news clip she saw and confronts the three people who are the most likely to have answers. Liam has a nightmare about something he witnessed as a boy. Sam gatecrashes her daughter's wedding when she uncovers who benefitted most from Adrian's death.
6	6	"Episode 6"	Jozua Malherbe & Morné du Toit	Mitzi Booysen & Rosalind Butler	4 March 2021
Sifiso discovers dodgy transactions in Hugo Investments books while Adrian begs for his brother's help. In the present, Sam corners the tabloid journo when she makes the front page with a story that enrages her family. While Miranda is on honeymoon, she is shocked to discover Brian's double life. Sam drowns her sorrows in a seedy hotel. What about her parole?
7	7	"Episode 7"	Jozua Malherbe & Morné du Toit	Mitzi Booysen & Rosalind Butler	11 March 2021
Sam must kidnap her daughter from a bully and makes good on an ominous warning she recently gave him. Lesedi hears her parents in conflict over her dad's involvement in the death of Liam's father. As Liam works through withdrawal symptoms, his memory about the night of his father's funeral starts to return.
8	8	"Episode 8"	Jozua Malherbe & Morné du Toit	Thomas Hall & Rosalind Butler	18 March 2021
Amo convinces Sifiso to come clean to Sam, but it's only when she sees the police report that the puzzle pieces fall into place. Armed with the information she was looking for, Sam asks Bonolo to help her get a 4x4 and a gun. Meanwhile, Miranda discovers a disturbing secret about someone she has known all her life. Meg teams up with Brian to get rid of Sam.
9	9	"Episode 9"	Jozua Malherbe & Morné du Toit	Thomas Hall & Rosalind Butler	25 March 2021
Sam finds the proof of what she was looking for, but bringing it back to Jo'burg is easier said than done. Moreover, back home, a deadly surprise is waiting for her.
10	10	"Episode 10"	Jozua Malherbe & Morné du Toit	Mitzi Booysen & Ilse van Hemert	1 April 2021
A family court case takes place in a high-rise hotel in Sandton, bringing a man face to face with his past. Samantha as prosecutor and judge, delivers her sentence. Meanwhile, Caitlyn is trapped in a smoke-filled room, and Sam has déjà vu, remembering her toddler's curtains on fire eight years before. As Sam rushes to save her daughter, the man she sentenced ends up on the roof, facing a gun in the hand of her outraged, traumatized son.

=== Season 2 (2023) ===
No. overall	No. in season	Title	Directed by	Written by	Original release date
11	1	"Episode 1"	Ilse van Hemert	Thomas Hall	26 January 2023
After the chaotic events eighteen months ago that involved burying a body, faking a death, kidnapping, and so much more, Sam faces a judicial panel about to rule on her fate.
12	2	"Episode 2"	Ilse van Hemert	Rosalind Butler & Ilse van Hemert	2 February 2023
The Hugo siblings are surprised by Sam's response to Jason's offer. Sam goes to see Anton in prison, and he shares with her what he has discovered about Jason. As she exits, Sam encounters an old enemy.
13	3	"Episode 3"	Ilse van Hemert & Rolie Nikiwe	David Gordon	9 February 2023
Sam spells out her plan to her family. As they leave NGO, someone with a grudge against Sam is waiting to make a move. After an encounter with a stranger, Megan starts to connect the dots and confronts Jason.
14	4	"Episode 4"	Rolie Nikiwe	Thomas Hall	16 February 2023
Bianca wants to meet the Hawk, who was the investigator in her husband's fraud case. Anton urgently summons Sam, but Sam is caught up in the fallout of Caitlyn's teacher drama, as Megan's role is revealed.
15	5	"Episode 5"	Rolie Nikiwe	Rosalind Butler & Mitzi Booysen	23 February 2023
A potential investor in Second Chance charms Sam while Lesedi probes Liam about his secret missions that involve violence. Max gets information from Anton in prison, and Sam makes a huge sacrifice for her youngest child.
16	6	"Episode 6"	Ilse van Hemert & Rolie Nikiwe	David Gordon	2 March 2023
Miranda realizes how dysfunctional her family has become, while Liam's past connection with Kevin is revealed. With Lesedi's help, Sam tracks Liam and Bonolo, who are caught in a gang war.
17	7	"Episode 7"	Rolie Nikiwe	Rosalind Butler & David Gordon	9 March 2023
Max cons his way into the sanatorium and confronts Yvette. Jason works to get Meghan back onside, while it is revealed just how far he was prepared to go to escape from his financial woes a year before.
18	8	"Episode 8"	Ilse van Hemert	Rosalind Butler & David Gordon	16 March 2023
Jason discovers how dangerous his opponent is, but can't reach Liam to stop the mission. Sam is horrified when she realizes what Liam set off to do, and Caitlyn overhears Jason commissioning a hit.
19	9	"Episode 9"	Ilse van Hemert	David Gordon	23 March 2023
Caitlyn goes into hiding, and Jason comes clean to Megan, desperate for her support. Amo and Sifiso must save Kevin's life, but can't find him, as Sam is in an abandoned underground station fighting for survival.
20	10	"Episode 10"	Ilse van Hemert	Thomas Hall & Ilse van Hemert	30 March 2023
Sam makes a huge sacrifice to save her family from the secret they buried 18 months ago. New information comes to light when Yvette makes a surprising confession.

== Production ==
On 8 January 2021, M-Net revealed the cast of Lioness; Shannon Esra would lead the series alongside Jacques Bessenger, Nokuthula Mavuso, Frank Rautenbach, Gerald Steyn, Joshua Eady, Fiona Ramsay, Natasha Sutherland, and Terrence Ngwila.

Vinette Ebrahim, Carl Beukes, Theo Landey, and Ayden Croy joined the cast of Lioness for its second season. Principal photography for the second season wrapped in May 2022.

== Release ==
Fugitive scored a deal with MultiChoice to present Lioness at the MIPCOM in Cannes. Arrested Industries secured the rights to the series.
