= Anton Harber =

South African professor of journalism (born 1958)

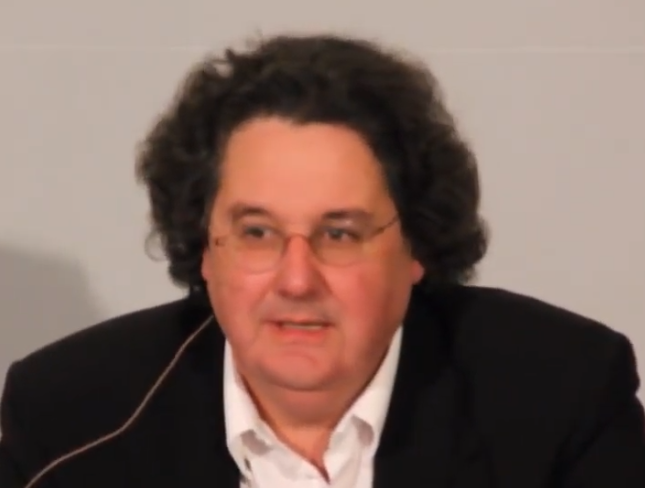
- Harber in 2010
- Born: 27 October 1958 (age 67); Durban, South Africa
- Education: University of the Witwatersrand
- Occupation: Journalist
- Spouse: Harriet Gavshon
- Relatives: Arthur Gavshon

Anton Harber (born 27 October 1958) is a South African journalist. He is executive director of the Campaign for Free Expression, director of the Henry Nxumalo Foundation an adjunct professor of journalism at the University of the Witwatersrand, and the co-editor or author of five books.

== Early life ==
Harber was born on October 27, 1958, in Durban, South Africa. He went to Carmel College, Durban, and graduated from the University of the Witwatersrand.

== Career ==
Harber started his career at the Springs Advertiser and worked at the Sunday Post, the Sowetan and Rand Daily Mail newspapers. He was political reporter on the Rand Daily Mail when it was closed in 1985. He was a founding co-editor of the Weekly Mail, later known as the Mail & Guardian, 1985-1997. He was then chief executive officer of Kagiso Broadcasting (Pty) Ltd and executive director of Kagiso Media Ltd. He left to form internet company BIG Media (Pty) Ltd.

Harber was appointed to the Caxton Chair of Journalism at his alma mater, the University of the Witwatersrand, as an adjunct professor. In this capacity, he launched the African Investigative Journalism Conference (formerly the Power Reporting Conference) since 2007, and hosted the 10th Global Investigative Journalism Conference in Johannesburg in 2017. In March 2016, he became the editor-in-chief of eNCA for a period of 18 months.

In 2021, he founded the Campaign for Free Expression, a non-profit dedicated to defending and enabling free expression for all in southern Africa. Harber also runs the Henry Nxumalo Foundation NPC, which provides support to investigative journalists.

Harber was chair of the South African Conference of Editors in 1991, the chair of the National Association of Broadcasters in 1998, and the chair of the Freedom of Expression Institute in 2010. He serves on the board of directors of the Global Investigative Journalism Network and the Centre for Collaborative Investigative Journalism (CCIJ).

He is the co-editor of three books about HIV/AIDS and investigative journalism in South Africa, and the author of Diepsloot (2011) and So, or the Record: Behind the headlines in an era of state capture (2020).

Harber was awarded the Missouri Medal of Honour in 1992 and the Pringle Award for Press Freedom in 1987.

== Personal life ==
Harber is married to Harriet Gavshon, a television producer and they have two children. He is related to the late investigative journalist Arthur Gavshon.

== Works ==
- Harber, A.; Palitza, K.; Ridgard, N.; Struthers, eds. (2010). What is Left Unsaid: Reporting the South African HIV Epidemic. Auckland Park, South Africa: Jacana Media. ISBN 9781920196257. OCLC 1017457773.
- Harber, Anton; Renn, Margaret, eds. (2010). Troublemakers: The Best of South Africa's Investigative Journalism. Auckland Park, South Africa: Jacana Media. ISBN 9781770098930. OCLC 794905854.
- Harber, Anton (2011). Diepsloot. Johannesburg, South Africa: Jonathan Ball. ISBN 9781868424214. OCLC 707332972.
- Harber, A (2017). Southern African Muckraking - 300 years of investigative journalism that shaped the region. Jacana. ISBN 978-1-4314-2782-6
- Harber, A. (2020). So, for the Record: Behind the headlines in an era of state capture. Jonathan Ball. ISBN 978-1-77619-068-3
