= Strickland v. Sony =

2005 American court case

- Court: Alabama
- Full case name: Strickland v. Sony
- Decided: 2010

Court membership
- Judge sitting: James Moore

Strickland v. Sony was an American court case that focused on whether violent video games played a role in the 2003 shooting of three police employees in Fayette, Alabama. In August 2005, attorney Jack Thompson filed the lawsuit against Sony. This case has been part of the debate over to what extent violent video games play a part in real-life violence.

== Background ==
Devin Moore

Devin Moore was convicted in 2005 for the 2003 murder of two police officers and a police dispatcher as he was being detained for driving an allegedly stolen car. He grabbed one officer's .45 caliber pistol and killed all three before fleeing the station in a police cruiser he stole from the station. He was caught the same day and sentenced to death by lethal injection in 2005.

== Case ==
In March 2005, Thompson announced he was filing a lawsuit on behalf of the families of two of the three victims in Fayette, Alabama. He was also featured in a 60 Minutes special on the case.

On November 1, 2005, Thompson sent an email to various websites commenting on the opening day of the civil trial. In it, he compared Sony and Take-Two Interactive's sale of the Grand Theft Auto video game to Imperial Japan's attack on Pearl Harbor during World War II. According to Thompson, certain regional governments in Japan had prevented the sale of the Grand Theft Auto games to minors, though Sony continued to sell the game where its sale was not restricted in Japan and abroad (Microsoft is doing the same for its own video game console). Thompson also compared the distribution of violent games to the distribution of pornography.

On November 4, 2005, Sony's defense team submitted a motion to have Thompson removed from the case, stating that Thompson would "turn the courtroom into a circus". On November 7, 2005, Thompson withdrew from the case. On November 9, 2005, the video game designer Warren Spector lashed out at Thompson for taking his comments out of context, saying "Take two or three things, from different contexts, mash them together and you can mislead people pretty dramatically."

On March 29, 2006, the Alabama Supreme Court upheld Judge James Moore's ruling against the dismissal of the case. Law firm Blank Rome, representing the defendants, had previously attempted unsuccessfully to have the suit dismissed during the pre-trial since it argued that the defendants had a right under the First Amendment to sell mature games to minors. At the time of the sale, there was no law preventing such a sale. Thompson called the ruling "exciting" because "no one has ever before survived a motion to dismiss." At the same time, the Alabama Supreme Court agreed to hear arguments as to whether the Fayette County Court had the jurisdiction to preside over the case at all.

On July 29, 2009, the court granted summary judgement to Take-Two.

== Alabama license revoked ==
On November 18, 2005, Judge Moore rejected Thompson's request to withdraw, and instead revoked his pro hac vice admission (a temporary license to practice in a given jurisdiction), in an 18-page decision. Thompson claimed the judge had "absolutely no authority" in preventing him from withdrawing from the case, and that therefore the court's decision to kick him off the case was a "legal nullity". He accused the court of punishing him for "aggressively telling the truth" while it "looked the other way when Blank Rome elegantly told those lies."

Judge Moore also referred this matter to the Alabama State Bar for "appropriate action", remarking, among other things that "Mr. Thompson's actions before this Court suggest that he is unable to conduct himself in a manner befitting practice in this state."

Thompson alluded that the "fixer" was local lawyer Clatus Junkin, although Junkin denied he had any influence over any judges, or that he had made such a comment, as he was "not that dumb [...] or foolish enough to imply that [he] could [influence Judge Moore]." He also declined Thompson's request to join the plaintiffs' team, citing disagreements over Thompson's demands of complete control of any contact with the news media. Judge Moore noted that even though he had banned comments on the case outside the courtroom, Thompson had issued seven different communications between the start of the case and the day he revoked Thompson's pro hac vice. After being thrown off the case, Thompson requested that Judge Moore recuse himself from the case. Moore ignored him, stating "I can't consider it because he's no longer practicing in the state of Alabama. If some other lawyer in the case asks me to recuse myself, I'll consider it in court." Judge Moore forbade Thompson from "[communicating] with the court or the judge" or he "would be held in contempt of court."
