= Theta Delta Sigma =

American gender-inclusive multicultural collegiate fraternity

- ΘΔΣ
- Founded: April 15, 2001 (25 years ago); University at Buffalo, SUNY
- Type: Social
- Affiliation: Independent
- Status: Active
- Emphasis: Multicultural
- Scope: National
- Motto: "Make diversity the rule instead of the exception"
- Colors: Light Blue and Night Blue
- Symbol: Paw Print
- Flower: Orchid
- Jewel: Moonstone
- Mascot: Wolf
- Philanthropy: Disadvantaged youth
- Chapters: 9
- Colonies: 5
- Nicknames: TDS, Thetas, The Pack
- Headquarters: 421 Eighth Avenue; New York City, New York 10001; United States
- Website: thetadeltasigma.org

Theta Delta Sigma Society, Inc. (ΘΔΣ) is a national gender inclusive multicultural fraternal organization founded in 2001 at the University at Buffalo (SUNY). Theta Delta Sigma is a non-partisan and non-sectarian organization that has been "a partner in the values-based fraternal movement".

== History ==
Theta Delta Sigma Society was established at the State University of New York, Buffalo on April 15, 2001, and recognized by the university as an official and organizing group on campus the same semester.

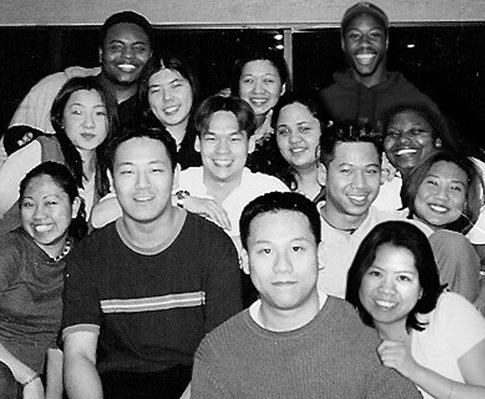
Theta Delta Sigma founders, 2001

The fourteen founders of Theta Delta Sigma Society were:

- Jamel Catoe
- Ritchie Chavez
- Kimberly Cheng
- Gilbert Chu
- Yvonne Gong
- Michael Liu
- Cecilia Mejia
- Brian Phillips
- Naudeya Richards
- Melissa Tang
- Joey Tsao
- Iris Wangpataravanich
- Jim Wong
- Judy Wong

The society was formed as a mixed-gender group that celebrates multiculturalism. Its members are referred to as the Transcendent Siblings, although some individuals may prefer brother or sister.

On March 23, 2003, Theta Delta Sigma was recognized under the laws of the State of New York as a non-profit organization as Theta Delta Sigma Society, Incorporated. The society has grown beyond the University at Buffalo to include entities across several states.

== Symbols ==
The society's motto is "Make diversity the rule instead of the exception." Its colors are light blue and night blue. Its symbols are the wolf and the paw print, giving it the nickname The Pack. Other nicknames are TDS and Thetas.

== Activities ==
=== Public service ===
Since its inception, the society has emphasized public service, including charity, advocacy, relief, education, and service.

The society's first service commitment was a volunteer babysitting program that provided low-income families with a free and dependable babysitter. This service has been discontinued; however, Theta Delta Sigma continues to be involved in the lives of youth through association with Big Brothers Big Sisters of America, Boys & Girls Clubs of America, Make-A-Wish Foundation, Toys for Tots, UNICEF, and Variety Club International

For one weekend each spring, all chapters and colonies hold concurrent service projects built around service to disadvantaged youth.

=== Educational development ===
The Collegiate Officer Leadership Academy focuses on the educational development of chapter officers and individuals looking to take on more responsibility in their chapter. Theta Delta Sigma partners with the Phi Mu Women's Fraternity for National Ritual Celebration Week, an annual initiative to encourage members of fraternities and sororities to reflect on the ritual that makes each organization unique.

=== Chapter programming ===
Held annually in the fall semester, Days of Diversity is a week of educational programs and service projects designed to increase diversity awareness and educate the community about multiculturalism.

Each chapter is responsible for organizing ThetaWeek events. ThetaWeek, typically held in conjunction with Founders' Day, events include leadership training, community service, diversity education, and social events designed to bring together the communities in which the chapters serve.

== Chapters ==
=== Undergraduate chapters ===
| Chapter | Charter date and range | Institution | Location | Status | Ref. |
|---|---|---|---|---|---|
| Alpha | April 15, 2001 | University at Buffalo | Buffalo, New York | Inactive | |
| Beta | April 11, 2004 | Stony Brook University | Stony Brook, New York | Inactive | |
| Gamma | May 1, 2005 | Trinity College | Hartford, Connecticut | Inactive | |
| Delta | April 27, 2008 | Adelphi University | Garden City, New York | Inactive | |
| Epsilon | February 28, 2010 | City University of New York | New York City, New York | Inactive | |
| Zeta | March 21, 2010 | Slippery Rock University | Slippery Rock Pennsylvania | Inactive | |
| Eta | April 25, 2010 | Virginia Tech | Blacksburg, Virginia | Inactive | |
| Theta | July 12, 2011 | | | Memorial | |
| Iota | April 21, 2013 | Widener University | Chester, Pennsylvania | Inactive | (Note: Founded as the Pride Associate chapter.) |
| Cohesion Associate | March 28, 2015 | University of Hartford | West Hartford, Connecticut | Inactive | |
| Aspire Associate | November 14, 2015 | University of Vermont | Burlington, Vermont | Inactive | |
| Vortex Associate | November 14, 2015 | University of Connecticut | Storrs, Connecticut | Inactive | |
| Plus Associate | April 23, 2016 | Montclair State University | Montclair, New Jersey | Inactive | |
| Beacon Associate | June 17, 2017 | Rhode Island College | Providence, Rhode Island | Inactive | |

=== Alumni and professional chapters ===
| Chapter | Charter date and range | Location | Status | Ref. |
|---|---|---|---|---|
| Alpha Theta | December 8, 2016 | New York Metropolitan Area | Active | |
| Beta Theta | June 4, 2017 | Greater Philadelphia, Pennsylvania | Active | |

== See also ==
- Cultural interest fraternities and sororities
