= Fayette, Alabama =

City in and county seat of Fayette County, Alabama

- City
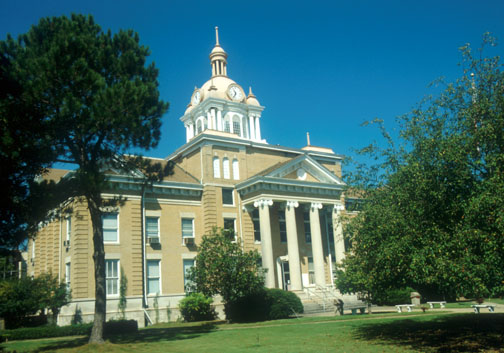
- Fayette County Courthouse in Fayette

- Flag Logo
- Interactive map of Fayette, Alabama
- Location within Alabama Location within the United States
- Coordinates: 33.6942°N 87.8312°W
- Country: United States
- State: Alabama
- County: Fayette
- Founded: 1821
- Incorporated: January 15, 1821

Government
  - Type: Mayor–council
  - Mayor: Rod Northam

Area
  - Total: 8.632 sq mi (22.357 km^{2})
  - Land: 8.549 sq mi (22.143 km^{2})
  - Water: 0.082 sq mi (0.212 km^{2}) 0.95%
- Elevation: 381 ft (116 m)

Population (2020)
  - Total: 4,285
  - Estimate (2024): 4,080
  - Density: 501.2/sq mi (193.5/km^{2})
- Time zone: UTC−6 (Central (CST))
  - Summer (DST): UTC−5 (CDT)
- ZIP Code: 35555
- Area code(s): 205 and 659
- FIPS code: 01-25840
- GNIS feature ID: 2403599
- Website: fayetteal.org

Fayette is a city in and the county seat of Fayette County, Alabama, United States. The population was 4,285 at the 2020 census, and was estimated at 4,080 in 2024.

== History ==
Originally known as "La Fayette", it incorporated on January 15, 1821. When Fayette County was created in 1824, the town's name was officially changed to "Fayette Court House", though it was also known as "Fayetteville", which was the name shown on maps and on the U.S. Census in 1880 and 1890. It was officially shortened to "Fayette" in 1898.

In 1928, Victor and Lucy Patterson began manufacturing Golden Eagle Syrup in Fayette. The syrup is still produced locally in a manufacturing facility in downtown Fayette.

== Geography ==
According to the United States Census Bureau, the city has a total area of 8.632 square miles (22.36 km^{2}), of which 8.550 square miles (22.14 km^{2}) is land and 0.082 square miles (0.21 km^{2}) (0.95%) is water.

=== Climate ===
The climate in this area is characterized by hot, humid summers and generally mild to cool winters. According to the Köppen Climate Classification system, Fayette has a humid subtropical climate, abbreviated "Cfa" on climate maps.

Climate data for Fayette, Alabama, 1991–2020 normals, extremes 1892–2011
| Month | Jan | Feb | Mar | Apr | May | Jun | Jul | Aug | Sep | Oct | Nov | Dec | Year |
|---|---|---|---|---|---|---|---|---|---|---|---|---|---|
| Record high °F (°C) | 84 (29) | 85 (29) | 91 (33) | 99 (37) | 101 (38) | 105 (41) | 110 (43) | 106 (41) | 106 (41) | 97 (36) | 87 (31) | 86 (30) | 110 (43) |
| Mean maximum °F (°C) | 72.0 (22.2) | 76.1 (24.5) | 82.9 (28.3) | 87.3 (30.7) | 91.4 (33.0) | 96.4 (35.8) | 99.0 (37.2) | 98.4 (36.9) | 94.6 (34.8) | 88.0 (31.1) | 80.2 (26.8) | 72.6 (22.6) | 100.1 (37.8) |
| Mean daily maximum °F (°C) | 54.6 (12.6) | 59.3 (15.2) | 67.9 (19.9) | 75.8 (24.3) | 82.8 (28.2) | 89.1 (31.7) | 91.8 (33.2) | 90.9 (32.7) | 86.5 (30.3) | 76.5 (24.7) | 65.2 (18.4) | 57.1 (13.9) | 74.8 (23.8) |
| Daily mean °F (°C) | 44.5 (6.9) | 48.3 (9.1) | 55.5 (13.1) | 62.9 (17.2) | 70.8 (21.6) | 78.0 (25.6) | 81.3 (27.4) | 80.0 (26.7) | 74.9 (23.8) | 63.9 (17.7) | 53.0 (11.7) | 46.8 (8.2) | 63.3 (17.4) |
| Mean daily minimum °F (°C) | 34.4 (1.3) | 37.2 (2.9) | 43.1 (6.2) | 50.0 (10.0) | 58.9 (14.9) | 67.0 (19.4) | 70.7 (21.5) | 69.2 (20.7) | 63.3 (17.4) | 51.3 (10.7) | 40.9 (4.9) | 36.5 (2.5) | 51.9 (11.0) |
| Mean minimum °F (°C) | 15.6 (−9.1) | 18.5 (−7.5) | 24.5 (−4.2) | 32.6 (0.3) | 42.9 (6.1) | 54.7 (12.6) | 61.8 (16.6) | 60.6 (15.9) | 45.8 (7.7) | 32.3 (0.2) | 24.8 (−4.0) | 18.5 (−7.5) | 12.0 (−11.1) |
| Record low °F (°C) | −5 (−21) | 0 (−18) | 8 (−13) | 25 (−4) | 32 (0) | 41 (5) | 49 (9) | 49 (9) | 33 (1) | 21 (−6) | 6 (−14) | −1 (−18) | −5 (−21) |
| Average precipitation inches (mm) | 5.45 (138) | 5.45 (138) | 5.30 (135) | 5.81 (148) | 3.95 (100) | 5.20 (132) | 4.88 (124) | 4.01 (102) | 3.33 (85) | 3.49 (89) | 4.28 (109) | 5.73 (146) | 56.88 (1,446) |
| Average snowfall inches (cm) | 0.2 (0.51) | 0.0 (0.0) | 0.0 (0.0) | 0.0 (0.0) | 0.0 (0.0) | 0.0 (0.0) | 0.0 (0.0) | 0.0 (0.0) | 0.0 (0.0) | 0.0 (0.0) | 0.0 (0.0) | 0.1 (0.25) | 0.3 (0.76) |
| Average precipitation days (≥ 0.01 in) | 10.8 | 10.4 | 10.1 | 8.1 | 7.6 | 9.9 | 9.5 | 9.1 | 6.3 | 7.1 | 8.7 | 9.6 | 107.2 |
| Average snowy days (≥ 0.1 in) | 0.2 | 0.0 | 0.0 | 0.0 | 0.0 | 0.0 | 0.0 | 0.0 | 0.0 | 0.0 | 0.0 | 0.0 | 0.2 |
Source 1: NOAA
Source 2: National Weather Service (mean maxima/minima 1981–2010)

== Demographics ==
Historical population
| Census | Pop. | Note | %± |
|---|---|---|---|
| 1880 | 180 | | — |
| 1900 | 452 | | — |
| 1910 | 636 | | 40.7% |
| 1920 | 1,741 | | 173.7% |
| 1930 | 2,109 | | 21.1% |
| 1940 | 2,668 | | 26.5% |
| 1950 | 3,707 | | 38.9% |
| 1960 | 4,227 | | 14.0% |
| 1970 | 4,568 | | 8.1% |
| 1980 | 5,287 | | 15.7% |
| 1990 | 4,909 | | −7.1% |
| 2000 | 4,922 | | 0.3% |
| 2010 | 4,619 | | −6.2% |
| 2020 | 4,285 | | −7.2% |
| 2024 (est.) | 4,080 | | −4.8% |
U.S. Decennial Census; 2020 Census

According to realtor website Zillow, the average price of a home as of March 31, 2026, in Fayette is $139,298.

As of the 2024 American Community Survey, there were 1,580 estimated households in Fayette with an average of 2.46 persons per household. The city has a median household income of $36,473. Approximately 42.0% of the city's population lives at or below the poverty line. Fayette has an estimated 35.4% employment rate, with 18.7% of the population holding a bachelor's degree or higher and 89.4% holding a high school diploma. There were 2,188 housing units at an average density of 255.91 per square mile (98.8/km^{2}).

The top five reported languages (people were allowed to report up to two languages, thus the figures will generally add to more than 100%) were English (100.0%), Spanish (0.0%), Indo-European (0.0%), Asian and Pacific Islander (0.0%), and Other (0.0%).

The median age in the city was 36.5 years.

=== Racial and ethnic composition ===
Fayette city, Alabama – Racial and ethnic composition Note: the US Census treats Hispanic/Latino as an ethnic category. This table excludes Latinos from the racial categories and assigns them to a separate category. Hispanics/Latinos may be of any race.
| Race / Ethnicity (NH = Non-Hispanic) | Pop 1980 | Pop 1990 | Pop 2000 | Pop 2010 | Pop 2020 | % 1980 | % 1990 | % 2000 | % 2010 | % 2020 |
|---|---|---|---|---|---|---|---|---|---|---|
| White alone (NH) | 4,175 | 3,776 | 3,684 | 3,364 | 2,877 | 78.97% | 76.92% | 74.85% | 72.83% | 67.14% |
| Black or African American alone (NH) | 1,074 | 1,072 | 1,148 | 1,118 | 1,057 | 20.31% | 21.84% | 23.32% | 24.20% | 24.67% |
| Native American or Alaska Native alone (NH) | 0 | 2 | 6 | 9 | 14 | 0.00% | 0.04% | 0.12% | 0.19% | 0.33% |
| Asian alone (NH) | 9 | 5 | 14 | 16 | 27 | 0.17% | 0.10% | 0.28% | 0.35% | 0.63% |
| Native Hawaiian or Pacific Islander alone (NH) | x | x | 0 | 0 | 0 | x | x | 0.00% | 0.00% | 0.00% |
| Other race alone (NH) | 5 | 0 | 0 | 0 | 5 | 0.09% | 0.00% | 0.00% | 0.00% | 0.12% |
| Mixed race or Multiracial (NH) | x | x | 23 | 46 | 165 | x | x | 0.47% | 1.00% | 3.85% |
| Hispanic or Latino (any race) | 24 | 54 | 47 | 66 | 140 | 0.45% | 1.10% | 0.95% | 1.43% | 3.27% |
| Total | 5,287 | 4,909 | 4,922 | 4,619 | 4,285 | 100.00% | 100.00% | 100.00% | 100.00% | 100.00% |

=== 2020 census ===
As of the 2020 census, there were 4,285 people, 1,796 households, and 1,058 families residing in the city. The population density was 501.17 inhabitants per square mile (193.5/km^{2}). There were 2,095 housing units at an average density of 245.03 per square mile (94.6/km^{2}). The racial makeup of the city was 68.66% White, 24.88% African American, 0.70% Native American, 0.63% Asian, 0.02% Pacific Islander, 0.65% from some other races and 4.46% from two or more races. Hispanic or Latino people of any race were 3.27% of the population.

The median age was 44.4 years. 21.0% of residents were under the age of 18 and 24.3% of residents were 65 years of age or older. For every 100 females there were 86.5 males, and for every 100 females age 18 and over there were 80.9 males age 18 and over.

0.0% of residents lived in urban areas, while 100.0% lived in rural areas.

There were 1,796 households out of which 28.2% had children under the age of 18 living in them. Of all households, 37.4% were married-couple households, 18.5% were households with a male householder and no spouse or partner present, and 40.0% were households with a female householder and no spouse or partner present. About 37.3% of all households were made up of individuals and 18.9% had someone living alone who was 65 years of age or older.

There were 2,095 housing units, of which 14.3% were vacant. The homeowner vacancy rate was 4.2% and the rental vacancy rate was 10.1%.

=== 2010 census ===
As of the 2010 census, there were 4,619 people, 1,924 households, and 1,206 families residing in the city. The population density was 540.23 inhabitants per square mile (208.6/km^{2}). There were 2,239 housing units at an average density of 261.87 per square mile (101.1/km^{2}). The racial makeup of the city was 73.39% White, 24.27% African American, 0.26% Native American, 0.35% Asian, 0.00% Pacific Islander, 0.56% from some other races and 1.17% from two or more races. Hispanic or Latino people of any race were 1.43% of the population.

There were 1,924 households out of which 26.5% had children under the age of 18 living with them, 40.8% were married couples living together, 18.2% had a female householder with no husband present, and 37.3% were non-families. 32.8% of households were one person and 14.0% were one person aged 65 or older. The average household size was 2.27 and the average family size was 2.88.

The age distribution was 22.9% under the age of 18, 9.6% from 18 to 24, 23.0% from 25 to 44, 25.6% from 45 to 64, and 18.9% 65 or older. The median age was 40.2 years. For every 100 females, there were 88.6 males. For every 100 females age 18 and over, there were 88.6 males.

The median household income was $31,705 and the median family income was $41,905. Males had a median income of $34,271 versus $27,500 for females. The per capita income for the city was $16,602. About 15.4% of families and 20.4% of the population were below the poverty line, including 23.2% of those under age 18 and 15.9% of those age 65 or over.

=== 2000 census ===
As of the 2000 census, there were 4,922 people, 2,092 households, and 1,303 families residing in the city. The population density was 575.11 inhabitants per square mile (222.1/km^{2}). There were 2,336 housing units at an average density of 272.95 per square mile (105.4/km^{2}). The racial makeup of the city was 75.34% White, 23.38% African American, 0.12% Native American, 0.28% Asian, 0.00% Pacific Islander, 0.30% from some other races and 0.57% from two or more races. Hispanic or Latino people of any race were 0.95% of the population.

There were 2,092 households out of which 26.9% had children under the age of 18 living with them, 45.2% were married couples living together, 14.2% had a female householder with no husband present, and 37.7% were non-families. 35.5% of all households were made up of individuals and 19.0% had someone living alone who was 65 years of age or older. The average household size was 2.20 and the average family size was 2.85.

In the city the population was spread out with 21.4% under the age of 18, 9.0% from 18 to 24, 24.2% from 25 to 44, 23.9% from 45 to 64, and 21.6% who were 65 years of age or older. The median age was 42 years. For every 100 females there were 81.4 males. For every 100 females age 18 and over, there were 75.7 males.

The median income for a household in the city was $25,714, and the median income for a family was $36,589. Males had a median income of $29,857 versus $21,899 for females. The per capita income for the city was $15,553. 18.0% of the population and 12.5% of families were below the poverty line. Out of the total people living in poverty, 21.2% were under the age of 18 and 22.9% were 65 or older.

== Parks and recreation ==
- Fayette Aquatic Center

== Government ==
Fayette is organized in a mayor-council form of city government, with a mayor elected citywide and five council members elected from districts.

== Education ==
Bevill State Community College has a location in Fayette.

== Media ==
- The Times-Record
- The Alabama News Wire
- WLDX Big Cat and WTXT radio stations

== Notable people ==
- John H. Bankhead, member of the United States House of Representatives and United States Senate
- Mike Davis, Detroit Mercy Titans men's basketball head coach
- Aaron Fultz, former pitcher for the San Francisco Giants
- Ronnie McCollum, professional basketball player
- Devin Moore, convict who sparked a controversy leading to the court case Strickland v. Sony
- Michael Moore, NFL player
- Charly "Carlos" Palmer, American fine artist
- Curt Porter, former offensive guard for the Denver Broncos
- Dexter Roberts, country singer; finished in seventh place on the thirteenth season of American Idol
- William Russell Smith, former mayor of Tuscaloosa, U.S. Congressman for the 4th District of Alabama, and member of the Confederate Congress
- Jimmy Lee Sudduth, outsider artist and blues musician
