= Devin Moore (murderer) =

American murderer (born 1985)

Devin Darnell Moore (born Devin Darnell Thompson on May 15, 1985) is an American convicted murderer who killed two law enforcement officers and a dispatcher at a police station in Fayette, Alabama on June 7th, 2003. Moore had been arrested for car theft and gained control of his arresting officer's service pistol. He was captured shortly afterward in Mississippi after fleeing in a stolen police cruiser.

The shooting sparked a controversy regarding violent video games, as Moore was quoted as saying "Life is a video game. Everybody's got to die sometime" during his arrest, with Moore's defense later arguing that Moore was not guilty by reason of serious mental defect. They asserted that his repeated playing of the video game Grand Theft Auto: Vice City had incited his shooting spree and that he was suffering from post-traumatic stress disorder following parental abuse by his father. The controversial video game theory was highlighted in an episode of the news magazine television series 60 Minutes on March 4, 2005.

Moore was convicted on October 9, 2005, and was sentenced to death by lethal injection. As of October 2026, he remained on death row and was appealing his sentence.

== Background ==
Devin Moore was born to Kenneth Moore and Gloria Thompson. Kenneth Moore ran a janitorial business, and met Thompson when she was fifteen years old, while babysitting his other children from a previous marriage. Moore has five older half-siblings, including Mookie Moore, a former National Football League player. Moore grew up in Covin, Alabama, briefly attending an alternative school in Walker County for a year. Between the ages of 7 and 16, he lived with his father due to his mother's substance abuse, also spending some time at foster homes. He moved to Jasper, Alabama in the tenth grade to live with his mother.

Moore graduated from high school in spring 2003 and had enlisted in the U.S. Air Force, being due for entry by the end of summer. Moore had prior contact with law enforcement for selling drugs and car theft, but had no criminal record due to being underage at the time, having turned 18 three weeks before the shooting.

== Fayette police killings ==
In the morning of June 7, 2003, at around 3:00 a.m., Moore was arrested on suspicion of driving a stolen Toyota Camry following a traffic check in Fayette County, Alabama and taken to Fayette's police station, at the time staffed by three members of the Fayette Police Department. At the station, Moore was charged with receiving stolen property, telling his mother in his jail phone call that he had bought the car from a "crackhead" in Jasper, after Moore offered him $500. During the booking process, Moore's fingerprints and a mug shot were taken. During this time, report came in that a dry cleaner, near to where Moore had received the car, had been burglarized, with clothes stolen. Moore later admitted to both the car theft and laundry burglary, as well as several other break-ins committed in Jasper during the same night. As a shoeprint was recovered at the scene, arresting officer Arnold Strickland also removed one of Moore's shoes to match the soles, unlocking Moore's handcuffs in the process.

At approximately 5:30 a.m., Moore attacked Strickland and managed to grab the officer's service weapon, a .40 caliber Glock pistol. After killing Strickland with two gunshots, Moore exited the booking office into the hallway, where he encountered officer James Crump, who had run to the scene after hearing the gunfire. Moore shot Crump three times and proceeded to go to the station's communications room. Outside the door, Moore killed unarmed dispatcher Leslie "Ace" Mealer, who was kneeling with his hands on the floor, by shooting him five times through a glass window. The shooting lasted less than a minute and all three men died from gunshot wounds to the head.

Moore initially exited through the front exit, but re-entered the station through the adjoining fire department, later stating he wanted to retrieve one of his shoes he had left behind. According to Moore, he only wanted to retrieve the shoe because he "paid $85 for [the shoes] and they looked good" and "didn't want to throw them out".Upon his third re-entry through the fire department, he ran into two fire fighters, telling them "something bad happened up front". Moore and one of the firemen went into the police station, and when the fire fighter left Moore alone to look for a phone upon discovering the bodies, Moore stole Strickland's keys and fled the scene in a stolen police cruiser. An ambulance arrived at around 6 a.m. and confirmed the deaths of both officers and the dispatcher.

The firefighters provided a description of the escape vehicle. Moore was arrested at 9:00 a.m. in Lowndes County, Mississippi. According to the Associated Press, after his recapture he said, "Life is a video game. Everybody's got to die sometime."

Once in custody, Moore quickly confessed and signed a written three-page letter containing his version of events. In a two-hour interrogation with Alabama Bureau of Investigation agent Johnny Tubbs, Moore admitted he shot the men because he didn't want to go to jail. Moore initially asked to be shot and that he was distracted by the "smell of death". Moore alleged that Strickland had acted "nasty" towards him and told Moore that he could receive a jail sentence of up to three years. According to Moore, his original plan was to take Strickland's gun and threaten Strickland into handcuffing himself to Crump, but he instead opened fire when Strickland started screaming. Moore stated that he didn't attack the fire fighters because he didn't see them as a threat and that he had hoped that police would kill him upon his arrest in Mississippi. Moore reportedly only showed emotion when told that he would not be able to join the military due to the murders. According to Tubbs, he never made any mention of video games.

=== Victims ===
Arnold Gunther Strickland, aged 55, was an officer for the Fayette Police Department since 2000. He was previously a police officer with several departments around western Alabama since at least 1980.

James Eddie Crump, aged 40, was a corporal for the Fayette Police Department since 2000. He graduated Tuscaloosa Law Enforcement Academy in 1994 and previously worked as an officer in his hometown of Hamilton, Alabama.

Leslie Franklin "Ace" Mealer, aged 38, was a dispatcher for the Fayette Police Department since 1988. He was also a dispatcher for the Sheriff's Department and 911 call centre of Fayette County, as well as a Reserve Deputy for the Fayette County Sheriff’s Department and a Reserve Officer for the Berry Police Department.

Remembrances for the shooting were held in 2004, 2013 and 2023.

== Legal proceedings ==
Moore's trial took place over the course of four weeks in summer 2005, under Judge James Moore. He entered a not guilty plea. Moore's attorney Jim Standridge, contended that Moore had PTSD and that could not differentiate between reality and imagination at the time of the crimes. Standridge argued that, as a child, Moore had been emotionally and physically abused by his father. Standridge later stated that media misrepresented his arguments and that he did not attempt to prove that the Grand Theft Auto video game had led to the shootings. Instead, the defense focused on Moore's alleged post-traumatic stress disorder and a potential state of dissociation that could have resulted in Moore engaging in "repetitive behavior", which in Moore's case would have included playing Grand Theft Auto.

Moore's defense stated that his father was physically abusive and forced his sons to perform manual labor from an early age. The claim was supported by his older half-brother Adam, Adam Moore's wife, and an aunt. Some of Moore's relatives also claimed that he frequently "zoned out" from reality while several of his teachers did not notice any abnormal behavior, including during an examination by school counselors in spring 2003, a few months before the shootings. Kenneth Moore and some family friends denied the allegations, with Kenneth being vocal during later media interviews about his son's previous behavioral issues, which included harassment of female classmates and carrying a knife to school.

Psychologists Charles Nevels and Marianne Rosenzweig testified that Moore met all criteria for post-traumatic stress disorder and that they believed that Moore was in a dissociative state during the murders. Another psychologist, Brent Willis, agreed that Moore had PTSD, but stated that Moore was aware of his actions, as he showed a clear recollection of the crime during questioning and deliberately exaggerated emotional problems, which Rosenzweig acknowledged in her own tests. Judge Moore dismissed the argument that Moore was unaware of his actions due to PTSD, citing that no conclusive evidence had been presented in the testiomny.

On August 9, 2005, after just over an hour of deliberation by the jury, Moore was convicted of three counts of capital murder. On October 9, 2005, he was sentenced to death by lethal injection. As of November 2018, Moore was incarcerated at Holman Correctional Facility. Moore appealed the conviction, but on February 17, 2012, the Alabama Court of Criminal Appeals upheld Moore's conviction in a 5–0 decision. The case was automatically appealed to the Alabama Supreme Court, and can then be appealed to the Supreme Court of the United States. Alabama Supreme Court denied certiorari in 2014. In April 2015, Moore filed for post conviction relief, which was dismissed in June 2016. The 24th Alabama Circuit Court ordered a summary dismissal of the relief petition in July 2017.

== See also ==
- List of death row inmates in the United States
- The Gamechangers
