= Boarding school =

School where some or all people live on campus

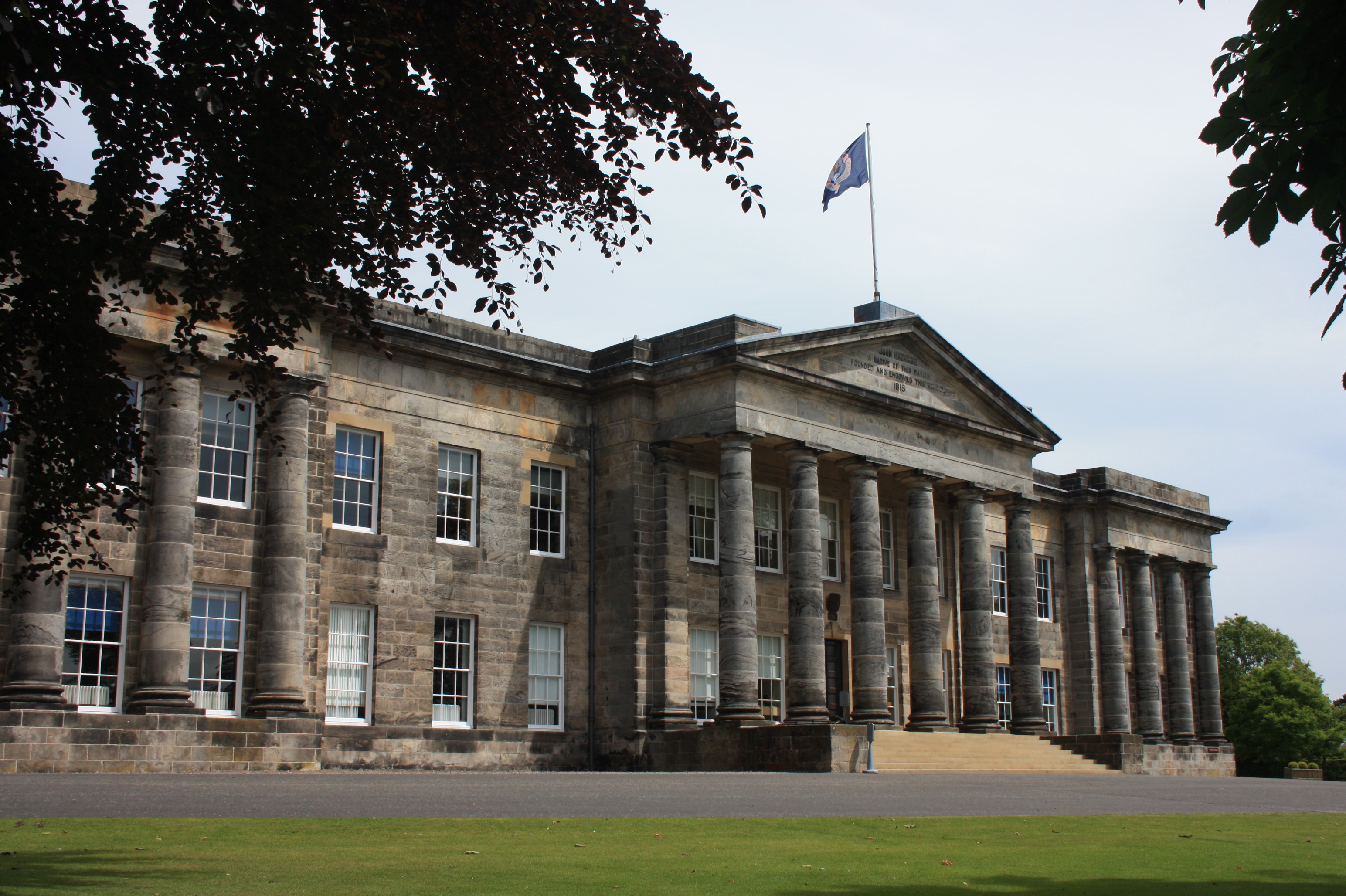
Dollar Academy, a boarding school in Scotland

A boarding school is a school where pupils live within premises while being given formal instruction. The word "boarding" is used in the sense of "room and board", i.e. lodging and meals. They have existed for centuries, and now extend across many countries. Their functioning, codes of conduct, and ethos vary greatly. Pupils in boarding schools study and live during the school year with their fellows, housemasters and housemistresses (also called matrons). Some boarding schools also have day pupils who attend the institution during the day and return home in the evenings.

Pupils who board at the school are called boarders, or day pupils if they don't board. Pupils may be enrolled for one to twelve years or more in boarding school. There are several types of boarders depending on the intervals at which they visit their family. Full-term boarders visit their homes at the end of an academic year, semester boarders visit their homes at the end of an academic term, weekly boarders visit their homes at weekends. There are also semi-boarders who attend a boarding school in the school hours for formal instruction and activities but return home by the end of the day. In some cultures, boarders spend the majority of their childhood and adolescent life away from their families.

Boarding schools are relatively more prevalent in the United Kingdom, Switzerland, India, Russia, China, and parts of Africa. These countries begin boarding schools at a very early age and for a longer span of time. Boarding schools are less prevalent in Europe and the U.S., where it is mostly seen for grades seven or nine through grade twelve—the high school years. Some are for either boys or girls, while others are co-educational. The United Kingdom has a long tradition of boarding school education, and the term public school has an elitist association. There are also some state boarding schools, many of which serve children from remote areas.

In some societies and cultures, boarding schools are the most privileged educational option (such as Eton and Winchester in the U.K., which have educated several prime ministers), whereas in other contexts, they serve as places to segregate children deemed a problem to their parents or wider society.

The United States and Canada forcibly assimilated indigenous children in the Canadian Indian residential school system and American Indian boarding school institutions. Some functioned essentially as orphanages, e.g. the G.I. Rossolimo Boarding School Number 49 in Russia. Tens of millions of rural children are educated at boarding schools in China. Therapeutic boarding schools offer treatment for psychological difficulties. Military academies provide strict discipline. Education for children with special needs has a long association with boarding; see, for example, deaf education and Council of Schools and Services for the Blind. Some boarding schools offer an immersion into democratic education, such as Summerhill School. Others are international, such as the United World Colleges.

== Description ==
=== Typical characteristics ===
The term boarding school often refers to classic British boarding schools and many boarding schools around the world which are modeled on these.

==== House system ====
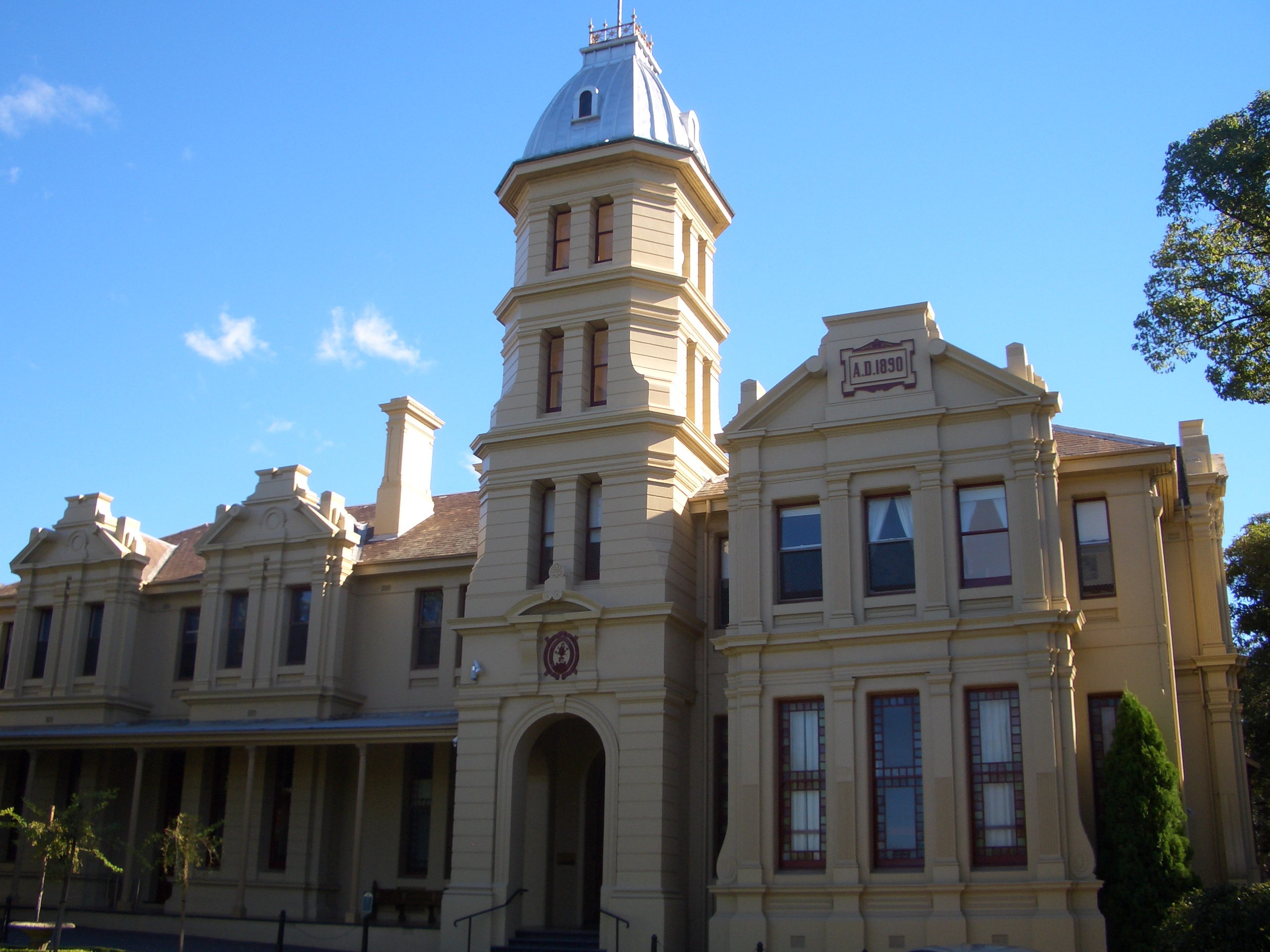
Boarding house of the Presbyterian Ladies' College, Sydney, New South Wales

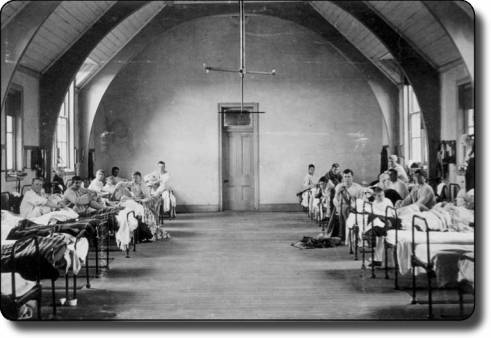
Dormitory at The Armidale School, Australia, 1898

A typical boarding school has several separate residential houses, either within the school grounds or in the surrounding area.

A number of senior teaching staff are appointed as housemasters, housemistresses, dorm parents, prefects, or residential advisors, each of whom takes quasi-parental responsibility (in loco parentis) for anywhere from 5 to 80 students resident in their house or dormitory at all times, but particularly outside school hours. Each house may be assisted in the domestic management of the house by a housekeeper often known in U.K. or Commonwealth countries as matron, and by a house tutor for academic matters, often providing staff of each gender. In the U.S., boarding schools often have a resident family that lives in the dorm, known as dorm parents. They often have janitorial staff for maintenance and housekeeping, but typically do not have tutors associated with an individual dorm. Nevertheless, older students are often less supervised by staff, and a system of monitors or prefects gives limited authority to senior students. Houses readily develop distinctive characters, and a healthy rivalry between houses is often encouraged in sport.

Houses or dorms usually include study-bedrooms or dormitories, a dining room or refectory where students take meals at fixed times, a library and possibly study carrels where students can do their homework. Houses may also have common rooms for television and relaxation and kitchens for snacks, and occasionally storage facilities for bicycles or other sports equipment. Some facilities may be shared between several houses or dorms.

In some schools, each house has students of all ages, in which case there is usually a prefect system, which gives older students some privileges and some responsibility for the welfare of the younger ones. In others, separate houses accommodate the needs of different years or classes. In some schools, day students are assigned to a dorm or house for social activities and sports purposes.

Most school dormitories have an "in your room by" and a "lights out" time for students depending on their age, when they are required to prepare for bed, after which no talking is permitted. Such rules may be difficult to enforce; students may often try to break them, for example by using their laptop computers or going to another student's room to talk or play computer games. International students may take advantage of the time difference between countries (e.g. 7 or 8 hours between China and the U.K.) to contact friends or family. Students sharing study rooms are less likely to disturb others and may be given more latitude.

==== Other facilities ====
As well as the usual academic facilities such as classrooms, halls, libraries, and laboratories, boarding schools often provide a wide variety of facilities for extracurricular activities such as music rooms, gymnasiums, sports fields and school grounds, boats, squash courts, swimming pools, cinemas, and theaters. A school chapel is often found on site. Day students often stay on after school to use these facilities. Many North American boarding schools are located in beautiful rural environments and have a combination of architectural styles that vary from modern to hundreds of years old.

Food quality can vary from school to school, but most boarding schools offer diverse menu choices for many kinds of dietary restrictions and preferences. Some boarding schools have a dress code for specific meals like dinner or for specific days of the week. Students are generally free to eat with friends, teammates, as well as with faculty and coaches. Extra curricular activities groups, e.g. the French Club, may have meetings and meals together. The Dining Hall often serves as a central place where lessons and learning can continue between students and teachers or other faculty mentors or coaches. Some schools welcome day students to attend breakfast and dinner, in addition to the standard lunch, while others charge a fee.

Many boarding schools have an on-campus school store or snack hall where additional food and school supplies can be purchased; they may also have a student recreational center where food can be purchased during specified hours.

Boarding schools also have infirmary, a small room with first aid or other emergencies medical aid.

==== Time ====
Students generally need permission to go outside defined school bounds; they may be allowed to travel off-campus at certain times.

Depending on country and context, boarding schools generally offer one or more options: full (students stay at the school full-time), weekly (students stay in the school from Monday through Friday, then return home for the weekend), or on a flexible schedule (students choose when to board, e.g. during exam week).

Each student has an individual timetable, which in the early years allows little discretion. Boarders and day students are taught together in school hours and in most cases continue beyond the school day to include sports, clubs and societies, or excursions.

British boarding schools have three terms a year, approximately twelve weeks each, with a few days' half-term holidays during which students are expected to go home or at least away from school. There may be several exeats, or weekends, in each half of the term when students may go home or away (e.g. international students may stay with their appointed guardians, or with a host family). Boarding students nowadays often go to school within easy traveling distance of their homes, and so may see their families frequently; e.g. families are encouraged to come and support school sports teams playing at home against other schools, or for school performances in music, drama, or theatre. It is recommended that international boarding school students have an appointed educational guardian.

Some boarding schools allow only boarding students, while others have both boarding students and day students who go home at the end of the school day. Day students are sometimes known as day boys or day girls. Some schools welcome day students to attend breakfast and dinner, while others charge a fee. For schools that have designated study hours or quiet hours in the evenings, students on campus (including day students) are usually required to observe the same "quiet" rules (such as no television, students must stay in their rooms, library or study hall, etc.). Schools that have both boarding and day students sometimes describe themselves as semi-boarding schools or day boarding schools. Some schools also have students who board during the week but go home on weekends: these are known as weekly boarders, quasi-boarders, or five-day boarders.

=== Other forms of boarding schools ===
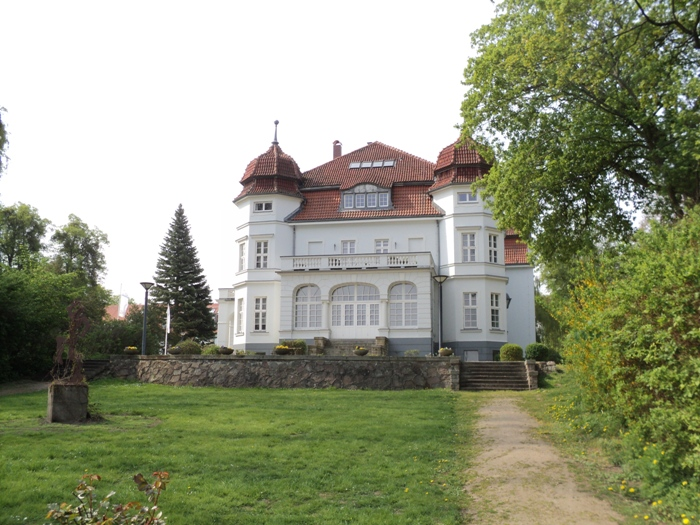
Schloss Torgelow, a Gymnasium boarding school in Germany, that leads to the Abitur exams

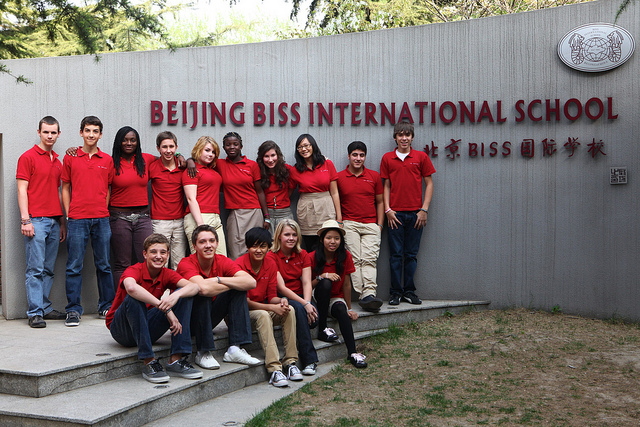
Traveling boarding schools, like THINK Global School, partner with an IB school in each country they visit.

Boarding schools are residential schools; however, not all residential schools are "classic" boarding schools. Other forms of residential schools include:

- Therapeutic boarding schools are tuition-based, out-of-home placements that combine therapy and education for children, usually teenagers, with emotional, behavioral, substance abuse, or learning disabilities.
- Traveling boarding schools, such as Think Global School, are two-year high school programs (grades 11–12) that immerse the students in a new country each term. Traveling boarding schools partner with a host school within the country to provide the living and educational facilities.
- Sailing boarding schools, such as A+ World Academy, are high schools based on ships that sail around the world and combine high school education with travel, and personal development. Classes typically take place both on board and in some of the ports they visit.
- Outdoor boarding schools, which teach students independence and self-reliance through survival style camp outs and other outdoor activities.
- Residential education programs, which provide a stable and supportive environment for at-risk children.
- Residential schools for students with special educational needs, who may or may not be disabled
- Semester schools, which complement a student's secondary education by providing a one semester residential experience with a central focusing curricular theme—which may appeal to students and families uninterested in a longer residential education experience
- Specialist schools focused on a particular academic discipline, such as the public North Carolina School of Science and Mathematics or the private Interlochen Arts Academy.
- The Israeli youth villages, where children stay and are educated in a commune, but also have everyday contact with their parents at specified hours.
- Public boarding schools, which are operated by public school districts. In the U.S., general-attendance public boarding schools were once numerous in rural areas, but are extremely rare today. As of the 2013–2014 school year, the SEED Foundation administered public charter boarding schools in Washington, D.C., and Baltimore, Maryland. One rural public boarding school is Crane Union High School in Crane, Oregon. Around two-thirds of its more than 80 students, mostly children from remote ranches, board during the school week in order to save a one-way commute of up to 240 kilometres (150 mi) across Harney County.
- Ranch school, once common in the western United States, incorporating aspects of the "dude ranch" (Guest ranch)

=== Applicable regulations ===
In the U.K., most boarding schools are independent schools, which are not subject to the national curriculum or other educational regulations applicable to state schools. Nevertheless, there are some regulations, primarily for health and safety purposes, as well as the general law. The Department for Children, Schools and Families, in conjunction with the Department of Health of the United Kingdom, has prescribed guidelines for boarding schools, called the National Boarding Standards.

One example of regulations covered within the National Boarding Standards are those for the minimum floor area or living space required for each student and other aspects of basic facilities. The minimum floor area of a dormitory accommodating two or more students is defined as the number of students sleeping in the dormitory multiplied by 4.2 m^{2}, plus 1.2 m^{2}. A minimum distance of 0.9 m should also be maintained between any two beds in a dormitory, bedroom, or cubicle. In case students are provided with a cubicle, then each student must be provided with a window and a floor area of 5.0 m^{2} at the least. A bedroom for a single student should be at least of the floor area of 6.0 m^{2}. Boarding schools must provide a total floor area of at least 2.3 m^{2} living accommodation for every boarder. This should also be incorporated with at least one bathtub or shower for every ten students.

== History ==
Boarding schools manifest themselves in different ways in different societies. For example, in some societies children enter at an earlier age than in others. In some societies, a tradition has developed in which families send their children to the same boarding school for generations. One observation that appears to apply globally is that a significantly larger number of boys than girls attend boarding school and for a longer span of time. The practice of sending children, particularly boys, to other families or to schools so that they could learn together is of very long-standing, recorded in classical literature and in U.K. records going back over 1,000 years.

In Europe, a practice developed by early medieval times of sending boys to be taught by literate clergymen, either in monasteries or as pages in great households. The King's School, Canterbury, arguably the world's oldest boarding school, dates its foundation from the development of the monastery school in around 597 AD. The author of the Croyland Chronicle recalls being tested on his grammar by Edward the Confessor's wife Queen Editha in the abbey cloisters as a Westminster schoolboy, in around the 1050s. Monastic schools as such were generally dissolved with the monasteries themselves under Henry VIII, although Westminster School was specifically preserved by the King's letters patent, and it seems likely that most schools were immediately replaced. Winchester College founded by Bishop William of Wykeham in 1382 and Oswestry School founded by David Holbache in 1407 are the oldest boarding schools in continuous operation.

=== United Kingdom ===
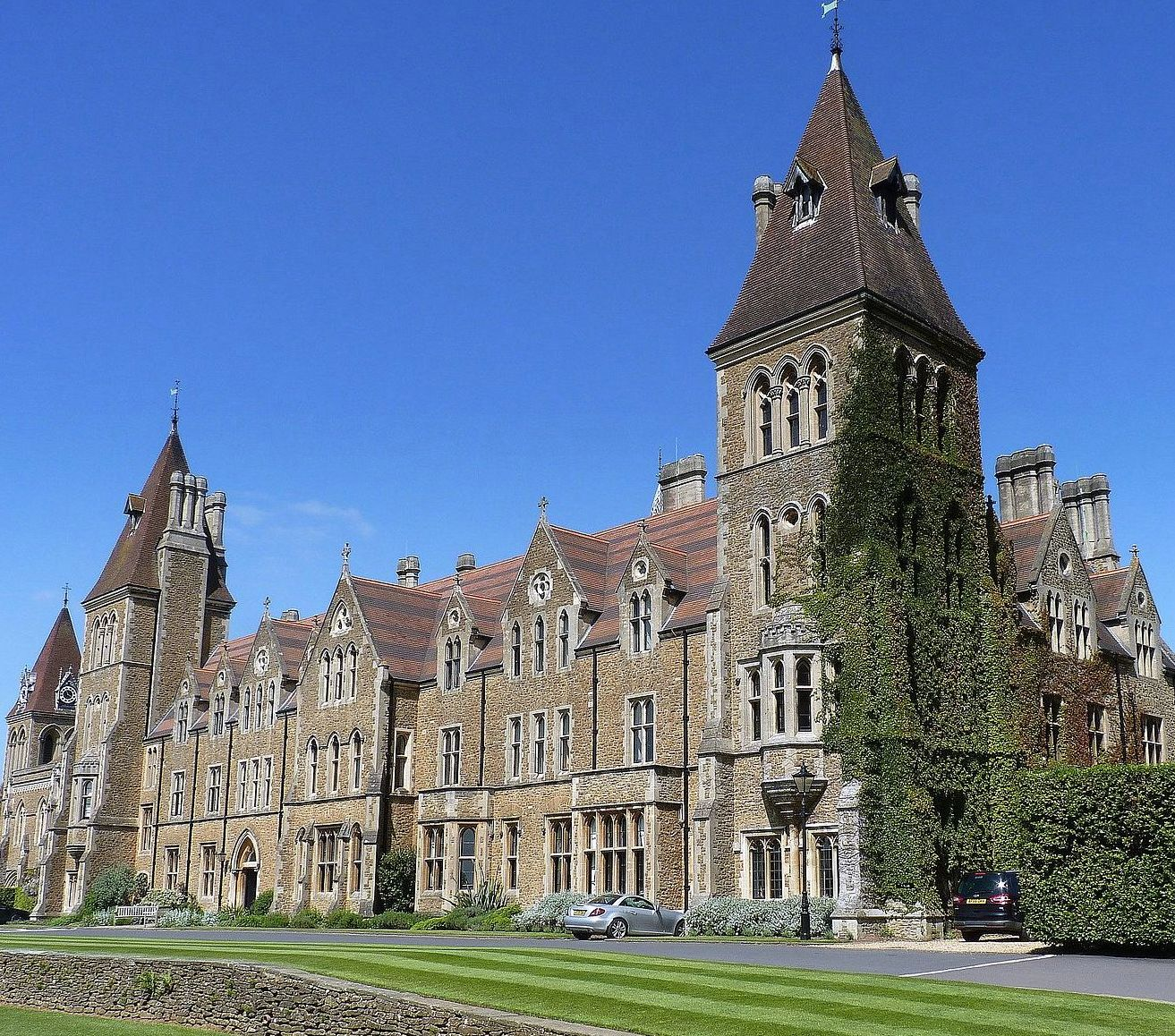
Charterhouse School

Boarding schools in Britain started in medieval times when boys were sent to be educated by literate clerics at a monastery or noble household. In the 12th century, the Pope ordered all Benedictine monasteries such as Westminster to provide charity schools, and many public schools started when such schools attracted paying students. These public schools reflected the collegiate universities of Oxford and Cambridge, as in many ways they still do, and were accordingly staffed almost entirely by clergymen until the 19th century. Private tuition at home remained the norm for aristocratic families, and for girls in particular, but after the 16th century, it was increasingly accepted that adolescents of any rank might best be educated collectively. The institution has thus adapted itself to changing social circumstances over 1,000 years.

Boarding preparatory schools tend to reflect the public schools they feed. They often have a more or less official tie to particular schools.

The classic British boarding school became highly popular during the colonial expansion of the British Empire. British colonial administrators abroad could ensure that their children were brought up in British culture at public schools at home in the U.K., and local rulers were offered the same education for their sons. More junior expatriates would send their children to local British-run schools, which would also admit selected local children who might travel from considerable distances. The boarding schools, which inculcated their own values, became an effective way to encourage local people to share British ideals, and so help the British achieve their imperial goals.

One of the reasons sometimes stated for sending children to boarding schools is to develop wider horizons than their family can provide. A boarding school a family has attended for generations may define the culture parents aspire to for their children. Equally, by choosing a fashionable boarding school, parents may aspire to better their children by enabling them to mix on equal terms with children of the upper classes. However, such stated reasons may conceal other reasons for sending a child away from home. These might apply to children who are considered too disobedient or underachieving, children from families with divorced spouses, and children to whom the parents do not much relate. These reasons are rarely explicitly stated, though the child might be aware of them.

In 1998, there were 772 private-sector boarding schools in the United Kingdom with over 100,000 children attending them all across the country. They are an important factor in the British class system. About one percent of British children are sent to boarding schools. Also in Britain children as young as 5 to 9 years of age are sent to boarding schools.

=== United States ===
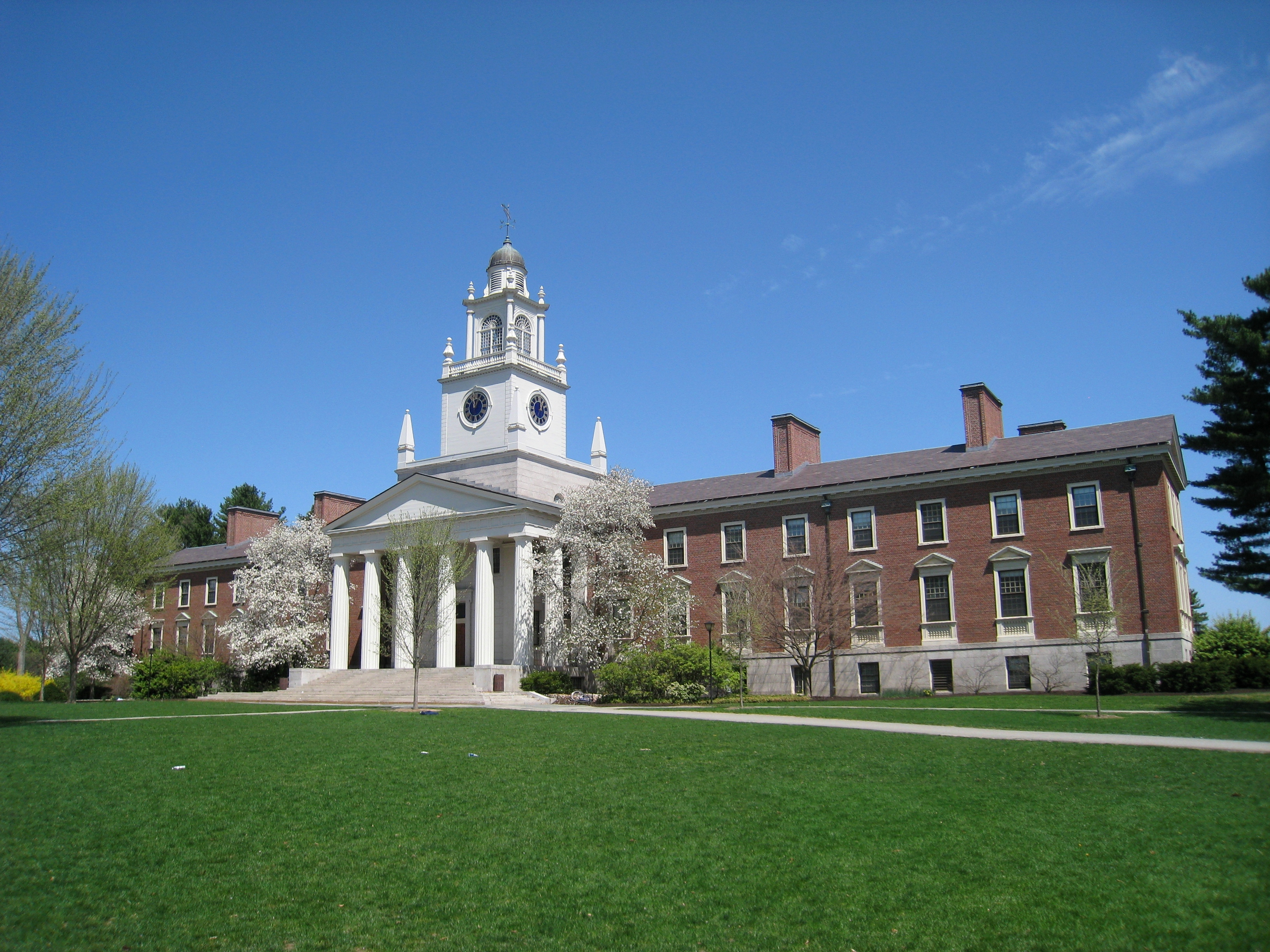
Phillips Academy Andover, MA

Before the advent of universal public education in the United States, boarding school was often the only secondary school option for students in rural New England communities. Some states, especially Massachusetts, sponsored and subsidized semi-public boarding schools, often called "academies," to educate students from the surrounding rural areas. Some of the oldest remaining academies include West Nottingham Academy (est. 1744), Linden Hall (est. 1756), The Governor's Academy (est. 1763), Phillips Academy (est. 1778), and Phillips Exeter Academy (est. 1781).

The market for semi-public academies narrowed in the second half of the nineteenth century as local governments began establishing free, public secondary day schools. Some academies joined the public school system, and others shut down. Towards the turn of the twentieth century, a new generation of boarding schools was established. These schools generally followed the British public school model and focused on preparing students aged roughly 14–18 for college entrance examinations. Because of their college-preparatory approach, they were dubbed prep schools, although most American prep schools educate only day students. At the turn of the twenty-first century, 0.5% of U.S. school children attended boarding schools, about half the percentage of British children.

In recent years, various governments have established public boarding schools. Some provide additional resources for academically promising students, like the North Carolina School of Science and Mathematics (est. 1980). Others provide a more focused environment for students from at-risk backgrounds.

Boarding schools for students below the age of 13 are called junior boarding schools, and are relatively uncommon. The oldest junior boarding school is the Fay School in Southborough, Massachusetts (est. 1866).

==== Native American schools ====
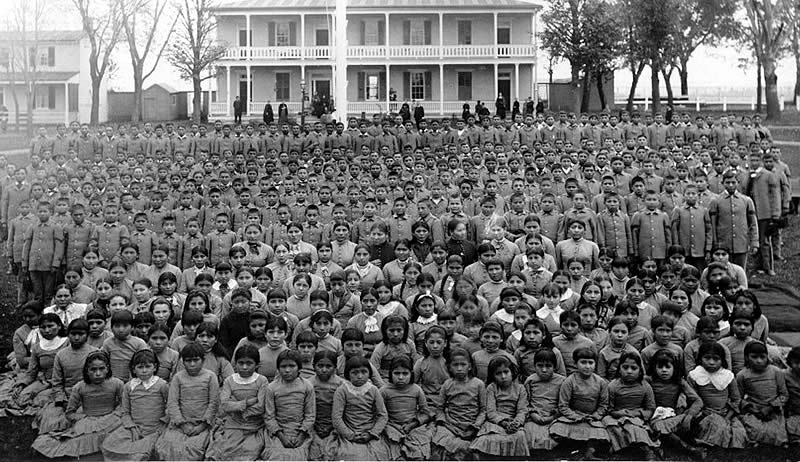
Students at Carlisle Indian Industrial School, Pennsylvania (c. 1900)

In the late 19th century, the United States government undertook a policy of educating Native American youth in the ways of the dominant Western culture so that Native Americans might then be able to assimilate into Western society. At these boarding schools, managed and regulated by the government, Native American students were subjected to a number of tactics to prepare them for life outside their reservation homes.

In accordance with the assimilation methods used at the boarding schools, the education that the Native American children received at these institutions centered on the dominant society's construction of gender norms and ideals. Thus boys and girls were separated in almost every activity and their interactions were strictly regulated along the lines of Victorian ideals. In addition, the instruction that the children received reflected the roles and duties that they were to assume once outside the reservation. Thus girls were taught skills that could be used in the home, such as "sewing, cooking, canning, ironing, child care, and cleaning" (Adams 150). Native American boys in the boarding schools were taught the importance of an agricultural lifestyle, with an emphasis on raising livestock and agricultural skills like "plowing and planting, field irrigation, the care of stock, and the maintenance of fruit orchards" (Adams 149). These ideas of domesticity were in stark contrast to those existing in native communities and on reservations: many indigenous societies were based on a matrilineal system where the women's lineage was honored and the women's place in society respected in different ways. For example, women in native society held powerful roles in their own communities, undertaking tasks that Western society deemed only appropriate for men: indigenous women could be leaders, healers, and farmers.

While the Native American children were exposed to and were likely to adopt some of the ideals set out by the whites operating these boarding schools, many resisted and rejected the gender norms that were being imposed upon them.

=== Canada ===
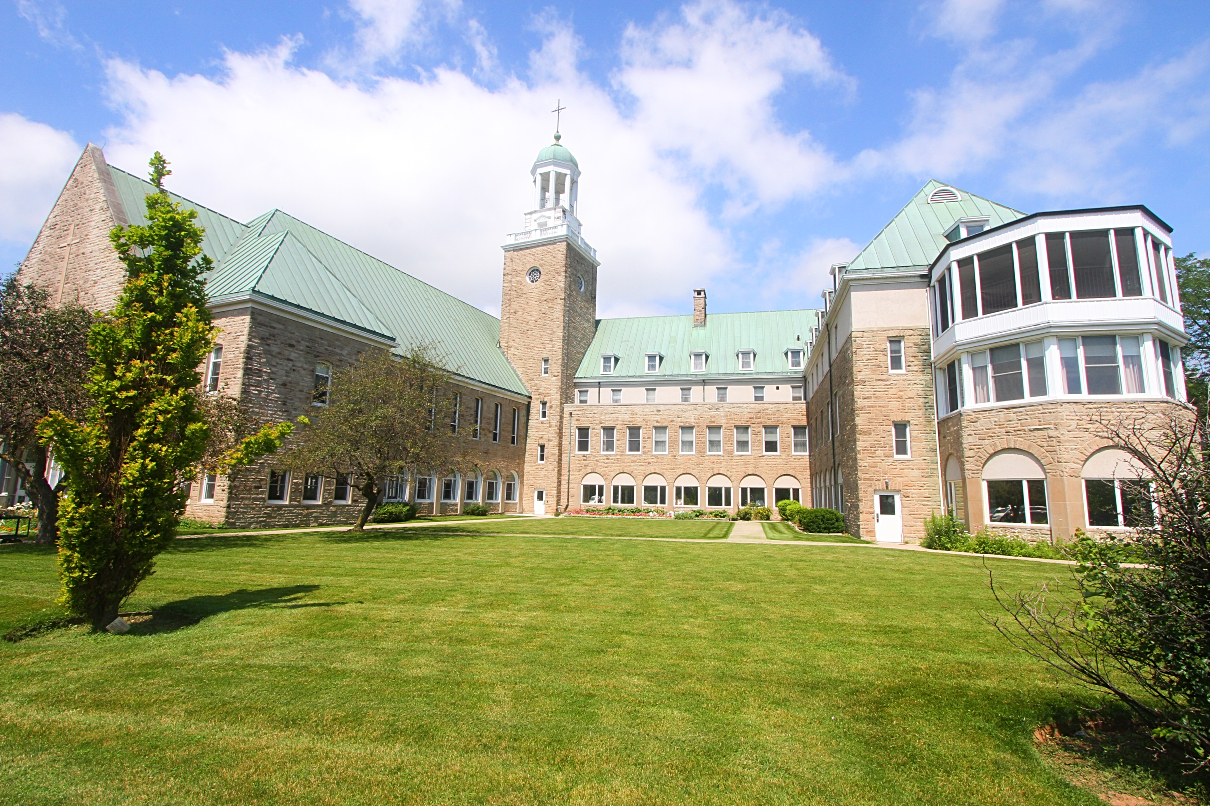
Columbia International College, Hamilton, Ontario

In Canada, the largest independent boarding school is Columbia International College, with an enrollment of 1,700 students from all over the world. Robert Land Academy in Wellandport, Ontario is Canada's only private military-style boarding school for boys in Grades 6 through 12.

=== Other Commonwealth countries ===
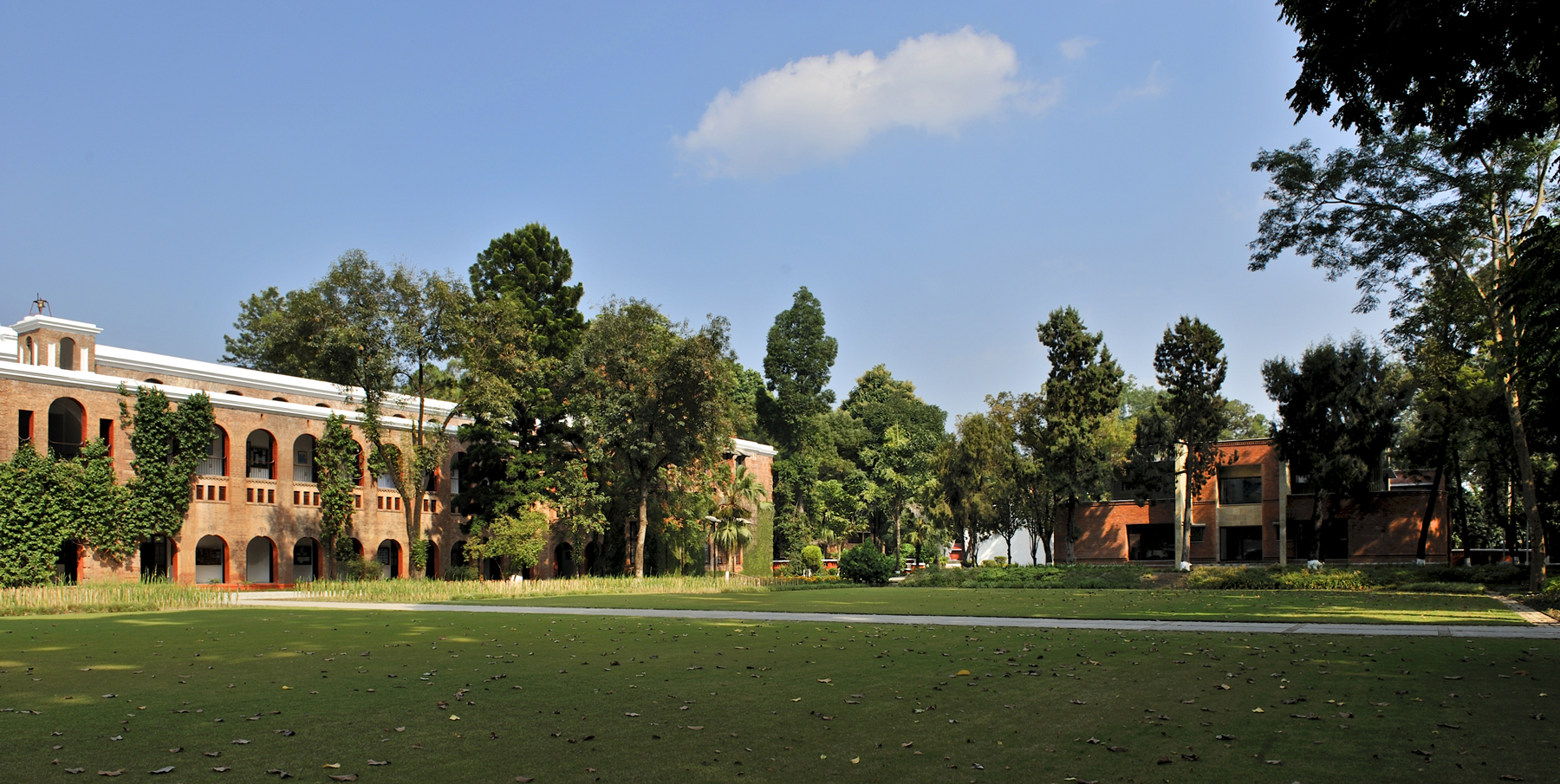
The Doon School, Dehradun, India

Most societies around the world decline to make boarding schools the preferred option for the upbringing of their children. However, boarding schools are one of the aspirational modes of education in some former British colonies or Commonwealth countries like India, Pakistan, Nigeria, and other former African colonies of Great Britain. For instance, in Ghana the majority of the secondary schools are boarding. In some countries, such as New Zealand and Sri Lanka, a number of state schools have boarding facilities. These state boarding schools are frequently traditional single-sex state schools, whose ethos is much like that of their independent counterparts. Furthermore, the proportion of boarders at these schools is often much lower than at independent boarding schools, typically around 10%.

=== Russia and former Soviet Union ===
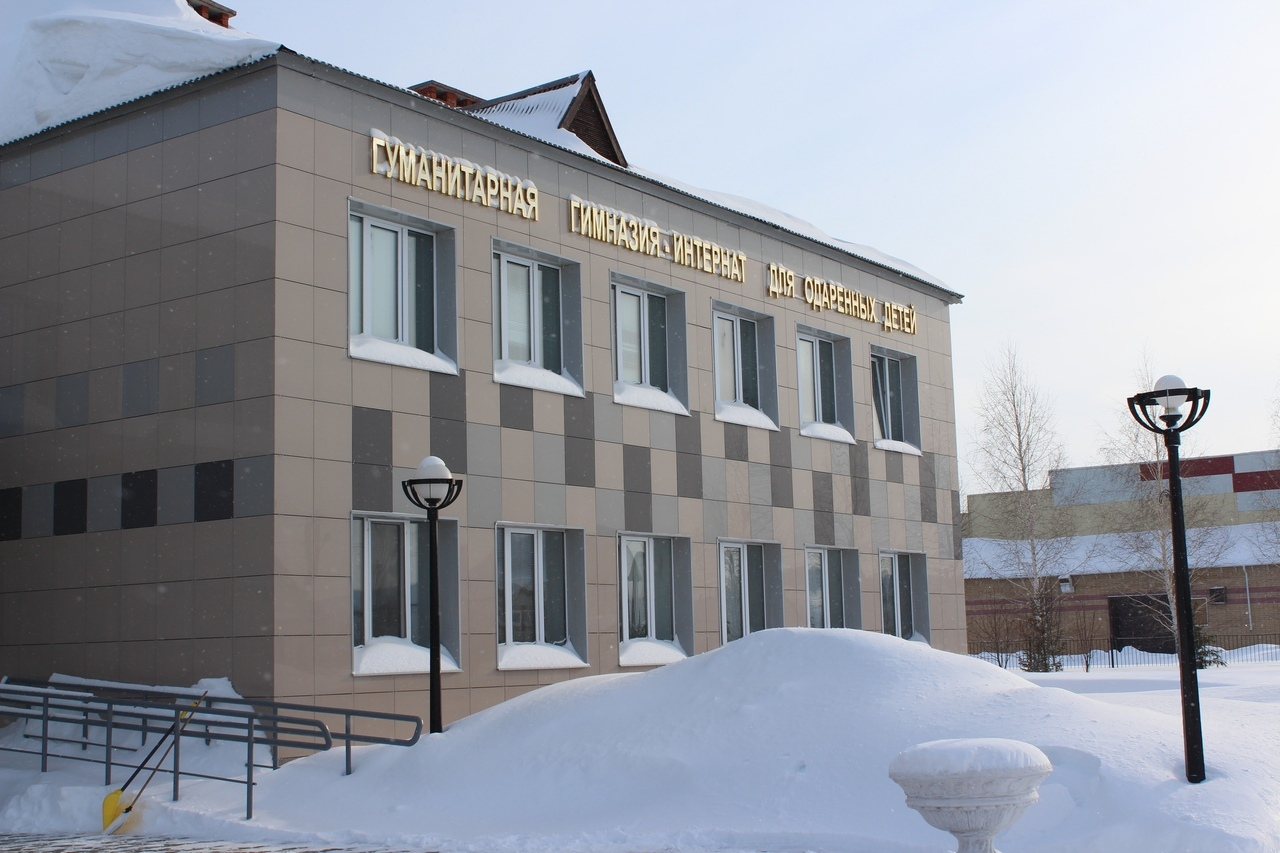
Boarding School of Humanities, Aktanysh

In the former Soviet Union these schools were sometimes known as Internat-schools (Russian: Школа-интернат) (from Latin: school-internat). They varied in their organization. Some schools were a type of specialized schools with a specific focus in a particular field or fields such as mathematics, physics, language, science, sports, etc. For example, in the 1960s Soviet official established a new type of boarding school, an AESC - Advanced educational scientific center (Russian: СУНЦ - Специализированный учебно-научный центр) (SESC - Specialized Educational and Scientific Center). Those schools were parts of some major universities and prepared students to study there. Now, only a few exist in Russia - in Moscow, Novosibirsk, and Yekaterinburg, though several boarding schools still operate in former Soviet republics, and even some new ones are being opened (e.g. MSU Gymnasium in Moscow, Russia, or Nazarbayev schools all over Kazakhstan). Other schools were associated with orphanages after which all children enrolled in Internat-school automatically. Also, separate boarding schools were established for children with disabilities (schools for the blind, deaf, and others). General schools offered "extended stay" programs (Russian: Группа продленного дня) featuring cheap meals for children and preventing them from coming home too early before parents were back from work (education in the Soviet Union was free). In post-Soviet countries, the concept of boarding school differs from country to country.

=== Switzerland ===
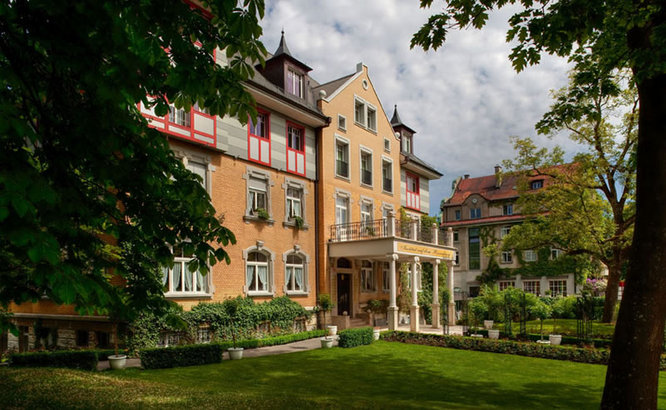
Institut auf dem Rosenberg

The Swiss government developed a strategy of fostering private boarding schools for foreign students as a business integral to the country's economy. Their boarding schools offer instruction in several major languages and have a large number of quality facilities organized through the Swiss Federation of Private Schools. In 2015, a Swiss boarding school named A+ World Academy was established on the Norwegian Tall Ship Fullriggeren Sørlandet. Some of the most expensive boarding schools in the world include the Swiss schools Institut auf dem Rosenberg, Institut Le Rosey, Beau Soleil, Collège du Léman, Collège Champittet and Leysin American School.

=== Japan ===
In Japan, there are several international boarding schools operated by private institution. Notable examples of privately-run institutions include NUCB International College and Hallow International School. These boarding schools are affiliated with various educational boards, such as the IB (International Baccalaureate), A-Level, and Article 1 of the Japanese School Education Law. English is predominantly used as the primary medium of instruction in these institutions.

=== China ===
As of 2015 there were about 100,000 boarding schools in rural areas of Mainland China, with about 33 million children living in them. In China some children are sent to boarding schools at 2 years of age. The majority of boarding schools are in western China, which generally is not as wealthy as eastern and central China. Many migrant workers and farmers send their children to boarding schools.

=== India ===
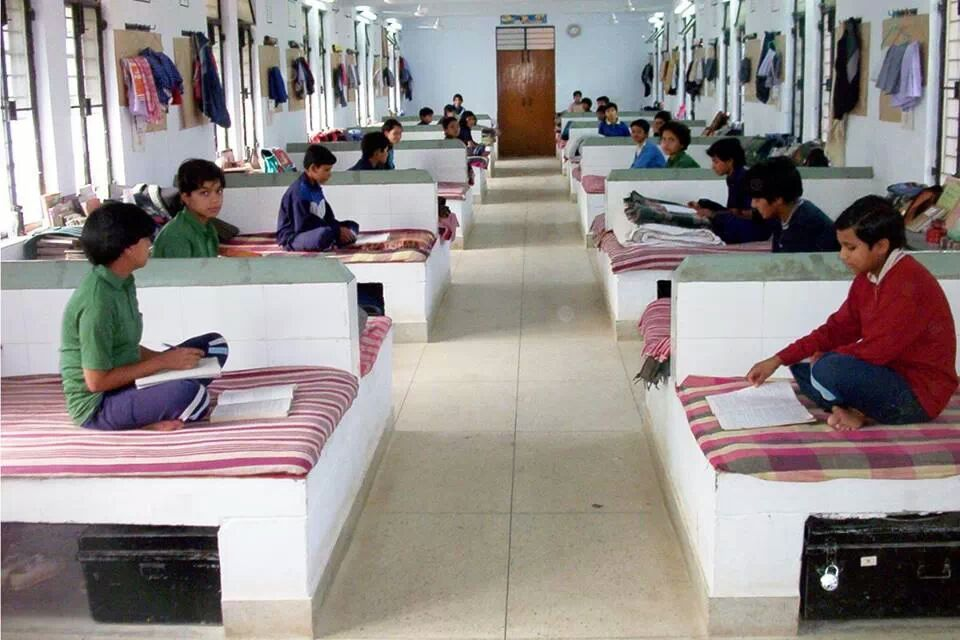
Boarder students at Jawahar Navodaya Vidyalaya, Barabanki

In India, there exists a variety of boarding schools, which are operated by both private entities and governmental bodies at the state and central levels. Some notable examples government run institute include are Jawahar Navodaya Vidyalaya, Ekalavya Model Residential School, and Ashram Schools. Boarding schools in India are affiliated with various educational boards such as CBSE, ICSE, IB, NIOS, and AISSCE. Those institutions predominantly use English as the primary medium of instruction.

== Sociological issues ==
Some elite university-preparatory boarding schools for students from age 13 to 18 are seen by sociologists as centers of socialization for the next generation of the political upper class and reproduces an elitist class system. This attracts families who value power and hierarchy for the socialization of their family members. These families share a sense of entitlement to social class or hierarchy and power.

Boarding schools are seen by certain families as centres of socialization where students mingle with others of similar social hierarchy to form what is called an old boy network. Elite boarding school students are brought up with the assumption that they are meant to control society. Significant numbers of them enter the political upper class of society or join the financial elite in fields such as international banking and venture capital. Elite boarding school socialization causes students to internalize a strong sense of entitlement and social control or hierarchy. This form of socialization is called "deep structure socialization" by Peter Cookson & Caroline Hodges (1985). This refers to the way in which boarding schools not only manage to control the students' physical lives but also their emotional lives.

Boarding school establishment involves control of behavior regarding several aspects of life including what is appropriate and/or acceptable which adolescents would consider as intrusive. This boarding school socialization is carried over well after leaving school and into their dealings with the social world. Thus it causes boarding school students to adhere to the values of the elite social class which they come from or which they aspire to be part of. Nick Duffell, author of Wounded Leaders: British elitism and the Entitlement Illusion – A Psychohistory, states that the education of the elite in the British boarding school system leaves the nation with "a cadre of leaders who perpetuate a culture of elitism, bullying and misogyny affecting the whole of society". According to Peter W Cookson Jr (2009), the elitist tradition of preparatory boarding schools has declined due to the development of modern economy and the political rise of the liberal west coast of the United States of America.

=== Socialization of role control and gender stratification ===
The boarding school socialization of control and hierarchy develops deep rooted and strong adherence to social roles and rigid gender stratification. In one studied school the social pressure for conformity was so severe that several students abused performance drugs like Adderall and Ritalin for both academic performance and to lose weight. The distinct and hierarchical nature of socialization in boarding school culture becomes very obvious in the manner students sit together and form cliques, especially in the refectory, or dining hall. This leads to pervasive form of explicit and implicit bullying, and excessive competition between cliques and between individuals. The rigid gender stratification and role control is displayed in the boys forming cliques on the basis of wealth and social background, and the girls overtly accepting that they would marry only for money, while choosing only rich or affluent males as boyfriends. Students are not able to display much sensitivity and emotional response and are unable to have closer relationships except on a superficial and politically correct level, engaging in social behaviour that would make them seem appropriate and rank high in social hierarchy. This affects their perceptions of gender and social roles later in life.

== Psychological issues ==
The aspect of boarding school life with its round the clock habitation of students with each other in the same environment, involved in studying, sleeping, and socializing can lead to pressures and stress in boarding school life. This is manifested in the form of hypercompetitiveness, use of recreational or illegal drugs and psychological depression that at times may manifest in suicide or its attempt. Studies show that about 90% of boarding school students acknowledge that living in a total institution, like boarding school, has a significant impact and changed their perception and interaction with social relationships.

=== Total institution and child displacement ===
It is claimed that children may be sent to boarding schools to be given more opportunities than their families can provide. However, that involves spending significant parts of one's early life in what may be seen as a total institution and possibly experiencing social detachment, as suggested by social-psychologist Erving Goffman. This may involve long-term separation from one's parents and culture, leading to the experience of homesickness and emotional abandonment and may give rise to a phenomenon known as the "third culture kid", or TCK.

The celebrated British classicist and poet, Robert Graves (1895–1985), who attended six different preparatory schools at a young age during the early 20th century, wrote:

Preparatory schoolboys live in a world completely dissociated from home life. They have a different vocabulary, a different moral system, even different voices. On their return to school from the holidays the change-over from home-self to school-self is almost instantaneous, whereas the reverse process takes a fortnight at least. A preparatory schoolboy, when caught off his guard, will call his mother 'Please, matron,' and always addresses any male relative or friend of the family as 'Sir', like a master. I used to do it. School life becomes the reality, and home life the illusion. In England, parents of the governing classes virtually lose any intimate touch with their children from about the age of eight, and any attempts on their part to insinuate home feeling into school life are resented.

— Robert Graves

Some modern philosophies of education, such as constructivism and new methods of music training for children including Orff Schulwerk and the Suzuki method, make the everyday interaction of the child and parent an integral part of training and education. In children, separation involves maternal deprivation. The European Union–Canada project "Child Welfare Across Borders" (2003), an international venture on child development, considers boarding schools as one form of permanent displacement of the child. This view reflects a new outlook towards education and child growth in the wake of more scientific understanding of the human brain and cognitive development.

Data have not yet been tabulated regarding the statistical ratio of boys to girls that matriculate boarding schools, the total number of children in a given population in boarding schools by country, the average age across populations when children are sent to boarding schools, and the average length of education (in years) for boarding school students. There is also little evidence or research about the complete circumstances or complete set of reasons about sending kids to boarding schools.

=== Boarding school syndrome ===
The term boarding school syndrome was coined by psychotherapist Joy Schaverien in 2011. It is used to identify a set of lasting psychological problems that are observable in adults who, as children, were sent away to boarding schools at an early age.

Children sent away to school at an early age suffer the sudden and often irrevocable loss of their primary attachments; for many this constitutes a significant trauma. Bullying and sexual abuse, by staff or other children, may follow and so new attachment figures may become unsafe. In order to adapt to the system, a defensive and protective encapsulation of the self may be acquired; the true identity of the person then remains hidden. This pattern distorts intimate relationships and may continue into adult life. The significance of this may go unnoticed in psychotherapy. It is proposed that one reason for this may be that the transference and, especially the breaks in psychotherapy, replay, for the patient, the childhood experience between the school and home. Observations from clinical practice are substantiated by published testimonies, including those from established psychoanalysts who were themselves, early boarders.

Scharverien's observations are echoed by a boarding schoolboy, George Monbiot, who goes so far as to attribute some dysfunctionalities of the U.K. government to boarding schools. British psychotherapist Nick Duffell refers to adults who have gone through boarding school separation as "boarding school survivors". He has described some of these individuals as exhibiting behaviors such as a sense of detachment from any relationships, workaholism, compulsive behavior, and a penchant to control.

== In popular culture ==
=== Books ===
Boarding schools and their surrounding settings and situations became in the late Victorian period a genre in British literature with its own identifiable conventions. (Typically, protagonists find themselves occasionally having to break school rules for honorable reasons the reader can identify with and might get severely punished when caught – but usually, they do not embark on a total rebellion against the school as a system.)

Notable examples of the school story include:

- Sarah Fielding's The Governess, or The Little Female Academy (1749)
- Charles Dickens's serialised novel Nicholas Nickleby (1838)
- Charlotte Brontë's novels Jane Eyre (1847) and Villette (1853)
- Thomas Hughes's novel Tom Brown's Schooldays (1857)
- Frederic W. Farrar's Eric, or, Little by Little (1858), a particularly religious and moralistic treatment of the theme
- L. T. Meade's A World of Girls (1886) and dozens more girls school stories
- O Ateneu (1888), written by the Brazilian Raul Pompeia and dealing openly with the issue of homosexuality in the boarding school
- Frances Hodgson Burnett's serial Sara Crewe: or what Happened at Miss Minchin's (1887), revised and expanded as A Little Princess (1905)
- Stalky & Co. by Rudyard Kipling
- Greyfriars School, created by Charles Hamilton (writing as Frank Richards) in 1910 in the first of what became 1,670 stories, many featuring Billy Bunter.
- George Orwell's essay "Boys' Weeklies" suggested in 1940 that Frank Richards created a taste for public schools stories in readers who could never have attended public schools
- Boy by Roald Dahl
- Dozens of boys' school novels by Gunby Hadath (1871–1954)
- Elinor Brent-Dyer's Chalet School series of about sixty children's novels (1925–1970)
- Erich Kästner's The Flying Classroom (Das Fliegende Klassenzimmer) (1933) is a conspicuous non-British example.
- James Hilton's novel Goodbye, Mr. Chips (1934) centers on a teacher, rather than on the students
- Ludwig Bemelmans' Madeline series of children's picture books (1939–present)
- Agatha Christie's Cat Among the Pigeons (1959), involving a murder at a boarding school for girls
- Penelope Farmer's Charlotte Sometimes (1969)
- In Jill Murphy's The Worst Witch stories (from 1974), the traditional boarding school themes are explored in a fantasy school that teaches magic.
- Dianna Wynne Jones's novel Witch Week (1982) features Larwood House where magic is not taught —its use is a capital crime— but many students grow into magic powers
- J. K. Rowling's Harry Potter series (1997–2007) features Hogwarts School of Witchcraft and Wizardry
- Jenny Nimmo's Children of the Red King series (2002–2009) features magically endowed children at Bloor Academy, which most students leave on weekends
- Libba Bray's Gemma Doyle Trilogy, volumes one and two (2003, 2006), features a girl's discovery of magical capabilities and realms
- Enid Blyton's Malory Towers, St Clare's and Naughtiest Girl series
- John van de Ruit's Spud book and movie series, that take place at a school based on Michaelhouse
- Jilly Cooper's 2006 novel Wicked! as well as her journalism, including in Jolly Super

The setting has also been featured in notable North American fiction:

- J.D. Salinger's novel The Catcher in the Rye (1951)
- John Knowles's novels A Separate Peace (1959) and Peace Breaks Out (1981)
- Robert Cormier's young adult novel The Chocolate War (1974)
- David Foster Wallace's novel Infinite Jest (1996)
- Edward Kay's science fiction novel STAR Academy (2009)
- John Green's 2006 young adult novel Looking for Alaska

There is also a huge boarding-school genre literature, mostly uncollected, in British comics and serials from the 1900s to the 1980s.

The subgenre of books and films set in a military or naval academy has many similarities with the above.

=== Films and television ===
- Tom Brown's Schooldays (1916)
- Mädchen in Uniform (1931)
- Goodbye, Mr. Chips (1939)
- Tom Brown's Schooldays (1940)
- A Yank at Eton (1942)
- The Guinea Pig (1948)
- The Happiest Days of Your Life (1950)
- The Browning Version (1951)
- Tom Brown's Schooldays (1951)
- The Belles of St. Trinian's (1954)
- Blue Murder at St Trinian's (1957)
- The Pure Hell of St Trinian's (1960)
- The Children's Hour (1961)
- Les amitiés particulières (1964)
- The Great St Trinian's Train Robbery (1966)
- The Trouble with Angels (1966)
- Young Törless (1966)
- Hasta el viento tiene miedo (1968)
- If.... (1968)
- Goodbye, Mr. Chips (1969)
- Tom Brown's Schooldays (1971)
- Candy Candy (1976)
- You Are Not Alone (1978)
- The Facts of Life (1979–1988)
- The Wildcats of St Trinian's (1980)
- Taps (1981)
- Pink Floyd – The Wall (1982)
- Class (1983)
- Another Country (1984)
- The Chocolate War (1988)
- Dead Poets Society (1989)
- The Power of One (1992)
- Scent of a Woman (1992)
- School Ties (1992)
- The Browning Version (1994)
- A Little Princess (1995)
- Boys (1996)
- Ponette (1996)
- Madeline (1998)
- Young Americans (2000)
- Lost and Delirious (2001)
- Harry Potter and the Philosopher's Stone (2001)
- Harry Potter and the Chamber of Secrets (2002)
- Cadet Kelly (2002)
- The Wild Thornberrys Movie (2002)
- The Emperor's Club (2002)
- Rebelde Way (2002–2004)
- Strange Days at Blake Holsey High (2002–2006)
- That'll Teach 'Em (2003–2006)
- Code Lyoko (2003–2007)
- Harry Potter and the Prisoner of Azkaban (2004)
- Yu-Gi-Oh! GX (2004–2008)
- Winx Club (2004–2019)
- Les Choristes (2004)
- La Mala Educación (2004)
- Harry Potter and the Goblet of Fire (2005)
- Zoey 101 (2005–2008)
- She's the Man (2006)
- Hanazakarino Kimitachihe (2006)
- 5ive Girls (2006)
- Four Eyes! (2006)
- Loving Annabelle (2006)
- Harry Potter and the Order of the Phoenix (2007)
- El Internado (2007–2010)
- St Trinian's (2007)
- Hanazakari no Kimitachi e (2007)
- Taare Zameen Par (2007)
- Wild Child (2008)
- Prom Wars (2008)
- Harry Potter and the Half-Blood Prince (2009)
- Archer (2009–2023)
- Cracks (2009)
- Tanner Hall (2009)
- St Trinian's 2: The Legend of Fritton's Gold (2009)
- Harry Potter and the Deathly Hallows – Part 1 (2010)
- Spud (2010)
- Harry Potter and the Deathly Hallows – Part 2 (2011)
- The Moth Diaries (2011)
- Barbie: Princess Charm School (2011)
- House of Anubis (2011–2013)
- Our Fires Still Burn (2013)
- Ever After High (2013–2016)
- Descendants (2015)
- Descendants: School of Secrets (2015)
- Descendants: Wicked World (2015–2017)
- DC Super Hero Girls (2015–2018)
- My Hero Academia (2016)
- Descendants 2 (2017)
- Legacies (2018–2022)
- Descendants 3 (2019)
- Descendants: The Royal Wedding (2021)
- Fate: The Winx Saga (2021–2022)
- The Boarding School: Las Cumbres (2021–2023)
- Young Royals (2021–2024)
- Pokémon Horizons: The Series (2023–present)
- Descendants: The Rise of Red (2024)

=== Video games ===
- Final Fantasy VIII (1999)
- Bully (2006)
- The Sims 3 (2009)
- Katawa Shoujo (2012)
- Life Is Strange (2015)
- Fire Emblem: Three Houses (2019)
- The Walking Dead: Final Season (2018)

== See also ==
- List of boarding schools
