= A Separate Peace (film) =

1972 film by Larry Peerce

- Theatrical release poster
- Directed by: Larry Peerce
- Written by: John Knowles; Fred Segal
- Based on: A Separate Peace by John Knowles
- Produced by: Robert A. Goldston; Otto Plaschkes
- Starring: John Heyl; Parker Stevenson
- Narrated by: Parker Stevenson
- Cinematography: Frank Stanley
- Edited by: John C. Howard
- Music by: Charles Fox
- Distributed by: Paramount Pictures
- Release date: September 27, 1972
- Running time: 104 minutes
- Country: United States
- Language: English
- Box office: $1,250,000 (US/ Canada rentals)

A Separate Peace is a 1972 American drama film directed by Larry Peerce. It was adapted by John Knowles and Fred Segal (brother of actor George Segal) from Knowles's best-selling novel, about the conflicted friendship of two boarding-school students. The film stars Parker Stevenson and John Heyl.

== Plot summary ==
During the summer of 1942, 16-year-old Gene Forrester attends The Devon School, a private boarding school in New Hampshire. His roommate is Phineas (nicknamed "Finny"), a free-spirited and cheerful nonconformist who is loved by everyone he meets. Gene, an introvert, tries to stifle his growing envy of Finny's athletic skill, natural popularity, and, above all, innate goodness, but he cannot control his feelings.

Unable to bear the knowledge that Finny is a better person, while they are both standing on a tree branch preparing for a double jump into the water, Gene apparently shakes the branch, causing Finny to fall to the ground and break his leg. This permanently disables him. After the incident, Gene meets with Finny and attempts to confess but then realizes that Finny desperately needs the illusion of friendship and that he must boost his fallen friend's self-confidence.

Finny returns for the winter semester; refuses to accept the wartime influences permeating Devon; and, though his own athletic career is finished, starts to train Gene for the Olympics. Finny continues to be resistant to the fact that a war is raging in the world until another student, "Leper" Lepellier, returns absent without leave and corroborates the horrible stories that are only now beginning to be relayed via a first-person narrative.

Another student, the judiciously minded Brinker Hadley, instigates an inquiry into Finny's accident and convenes a kangaroo court of fellow students. During this hearing, Leper reveals the truth about what happened, as he had been looking up from under the tree as Gene allegedly jostled the branch. Finny becomes angry and emotional, and in his effort to escape the tribunal, he falls down the stairs and breaks the same leg.

The second disaster has a curious healing effect on both boys, and when Gene visits Finny in the infirmary, they reconcile. Finny accepts the fact that Gene never meant to hurt him, and Gene reveals his belief that Finny would have been emotionally unfit for war anyway. During a second procedure on his leg, bone marrow enters Finny's bloodstream, travels to his heart, and kills him. The surgeon tells a shell-shocked Gene "there are risks, always risks", and the surviving boy realizes that part of him has died with his best friend.

== Cast ==
- John Heyl as Finny
- Parker Stevenson as Gene
- William Roerick as Mr. Patchwithers
- Peter Brush as Leper
- Victor Bevine as Brinker
- Scott Bradbury as Chet
- John E.A. Mackenzie as Bobby
- Mark Trefethen as John
- Frank Wilich Jr. as Quackenbush
- Elizabeth B. Brewster as Mrs. Patchwithers
- Edward Echols as Mr. Ludsbury
- Don Schultz as Dr. Stanpole
- Paul Sadler as Naval Officer

== Reception ==
Vincent Canby of The New York Times wrote:

Larry Peerce's film version of A Separate Peace is so good and true in small, subsidiary details of costume, music, weather and such that the ultimate banality of what it's all about is just that much more apparent, and just that much more difficult to accept without seeming unnecessarily ill-tempered [...] Peerce is very good with his almost completely nonprofessional cast, especially with John Heyl, a stocky, handsome young man whose face reflects the profound cheerfulness of someone who will never grow old. Parker Stevenson has the more difficult role (perhaps an impossible one) and I'm not sure I'd have had much idea of what was going on in his mind had I not read the book. As he displayed in Goodbye, Columbus, Peerce has a positive talent not only for period detail, but also for knowing when and how to cut around and away from the performances of non-actors so that Heyl, Stevenson and a large proportion of the Exeter student body manage to come up trumps.

Film historian Leonard Maltin denounced the picture in his annual Movie and Video Guide: "Supposedly sensitive story of two roommates in a 1940s prep school, taken from John Knowles' overrated novel, is enough to make anyone gag. Story is morbid, acting amateurish, and direction has no feeling at all for the period. A total bummer." giving it his lowest rating of "BOMB."

Steven H. Scheuer's Movies on TV guide said of the film: "Director Larry Peerce has fashioned a strangely arch, listless film...the '40s atmosphere is well done, but Peerce seems as afraid of closeness and commitment as his protagonists."

The film received glowingly-positive reviews from William Wolf in Cue magazine, Wanda Hale in the New York Daily News, and Rex Reed (who at the time was also writing for the Daily News). Reed called it "one of the best films about youth ever made" and added, "I have seen it three times, and I dare say I have a few visits left in me." On the review aggregator website Rotten Tomatoes, 60% of 5 critics' reviews are positive.
