= David Hackett =

American government official (1926–2011)

David Low Hackett (November 12, 1926 – April 23, 2011) was an American official born in Dedham, Massachusetts.

== Biography ==
Hackett served in the United States Army in Europe during World War II. He attended McGill University, completing a B.A. in 1950.

He was appointed by President John F. Kennedy to head the President's Committee on Juvenile Delinquency and Youth Crime. Later, Hackett headed a study group for the establishment of a domestic peace corps organization, which later became AmeriCorps Vista. A friend of Robert F. Kennedy, Hackett assisted with Kennedy's presidential campaign in 1968.

Hackett lived in Bethesda, Maryland. He was the inspiration for the character Phineas in A Separate Peace by John Knowles. "It's clear that Phineas' house was 848 High Street," across from the Dedham Common.
