= Peace Breaks Out =

1981 novel by John Knowles

- Cover to a recent paperback edition
- Author: John Knowles
- Language: English
- Genre: Novel
- Publisher: Bantam Books
- Publication date: March 1981
- Publication place: United States
- Media type: Print (hardback & paperback)
- Pages: 178 pp (paperback edition)
- ISBN: 0-03-056908-7 (hardback edition) & ISBN 0-553-27574-7 (paperback edition)
- OCLC: 6555306
- Dewey Decimal: 813/.54 19
- LC Class: PS3561.N68 P4
- Preceded by: A Separate Peace

Peace Breaks Out (1981) is a novel by American author John Knowles, better known for A Separate Peace (1959). Both books share the setting of the Devon preparatory school.

== Plot ==
The book follows the story of Pete Hallam as he returns to the school and becomes a history teacher as well as a coach. It is a story of the aftermath of World War II and the loss of innocence of young men.

It starts by Pete Hallam returning, war-torn and emotionally scarred, to the school from which he graduated. He is now a teacher at Devon School and detects a subtle but deep hate between two members of the class in the first session alone.

== Characters ==
- Pete Hallam – the school teacher and main character. He is an alumnus of Devon.
- Wexford – a troublemaker who stops at nothing to go through with his vengeful plans.
- Eric Hochschwender – rival of Wexford, he often provokes and annoys him.
- Rob Willis – Hochschwender's roommate.
- Nick Blackburn – A lively, popular boy.
- Tug Blackburn – Nick's brother.
- Cotty Donaldson – Tug's roommate.
- Joan Hallam – Pete's ex-wife.

== Reception ==
Paul Merkoski wrote in The Press of Atlantic City that the novel is "written with elegant simplicity", and that Knowles is still a "master of tight writing, and his characters are still drawn with light brush strokes that permeate a carefully structured plot". But, Merkoski goes on to say that this novel is "less riveting and generally less effective", than the prequel A Separate Peace. His final thoughts are the book will "delight and entertain young readers", but that it "does not speak to adult readers".

In his review for the Greensboro News and Record, William Moore writes that the novel "has a good quick-paced plot, leading to a shocking ending", and that it has "adequate if unbrilliant characterization and a rather obvious, simplistic philosophy of human nature". He says that readers who are interested in "schooling", will find this sequel "good reading".

Robert Merritt's review in the Richmond Times-Dispatch was critical of the book, saying; it has "absolutely no subtlety", and that the "characterizations are set up with signposts: each character clearly labeled as good, bad or misunderstood". He complained that the "plot is so much an obvious attempt to follow the outline of the earlier success as to be embarrassing, and the resulting predictability is simply too much". He opines that Knowles "speaks with a big voice, but he seems to have forgotten the basics of a good story".

Diane Cole said in The Baltimore Sun that she thought while the novel "does not achieve its predecessor's heights, it is pleasing, disturbing and very good indeed". In her view, she says Knowles has still "built a sturdy structure", and she ranks it "just below" The Catcher in the Rye and A Good School.

Pittsburgh Post-Gazettes Marilyn Uricchio didn't like the book at all, she stated that it is a "sparsely-written novel" and it "lacks the freshness of A Separate Peace, so much so that at times it becomes repetitive, almost stale". She argues that Knowles uses descriptors "of the day, the sky, the air with maddening regularity as transitional devices, and their detailed abundance turns them into lyrical weather reports". She also complained that the "dialogue appears too tame for young men of any generation; his characters don't even know to use obscenities". She finishes her review by saying the "result is often hollow and contrived".

== See also ==
- Coming of age
- List of coming-of-age stories
