= G.I. Rossolimo Boarding School Number 49 =

Boarding school in Moscow

SBEI Boarding School Number 49 G. I. Rossolimo for Orphans with Delayed Mental Development
- ГБУ "ЦССВ им. Г. И. Россолимо»
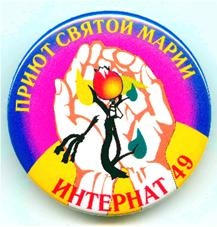
- Former names: (ЦССВ им. Г.И.Россолимо) Центр содействия семейного воспитания имени Г.И.Россолимо
- Motto: "Мы разные – в этом наше богатство, мы вместе – это наша сила"
- Motto in English: "We are different – this is our wealth, we are together – this is our strength"
- Established: Russian Empire, 1873
- Director: Turina Tatiana Alexandrovna
- Students: 110
- Undergraduates: 110
- Location: Moscow, Eastern Administrative Okrug (EAO), Russia; 55°42′56″N 37°54′37″E
- Language: Russian, English
- Website: cssv-rossolimo.ru

G.I. Rossolimo Boarding School No. 49 is a boarding school for orphans with mental disabilities, located in Moscow. Founded in 1873, initially known as the St. Mary's Shelter (Russian: Убежище Святой Марии, romanized: Ubyezhishchye Svatoy Mariy), served as a center for research in child psychopathology under the direction of G.I. Rossolimo. It was named for him in 1928.

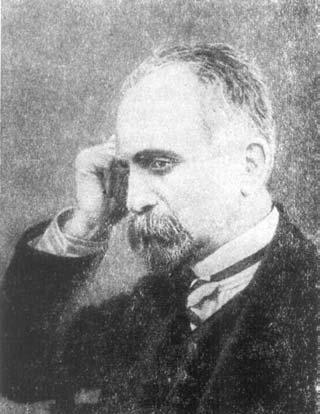
Grigory Ivanovich Rossolimo (1840–1928)

== History ==
=== During the Russian Empire ===
St. Mary's Shelter was founded in 1873 through the efforts of a well-known philanthropist and pediatrician Varvara Evgrafovna Chertovaya (1805–1903), and N.A.Tolskogo (1832–1891), a professor at a Moscow University. The shelter accepted children as young as the age of five who had dementia, epilepsy, and blindness. The number of children was gradually increasing and by 1907 had reached 62. The institution was a charity organisation and was supported by private donations.

In 1909, a neuropathologist who focused on defects in children, Grigory Ivanovich Rossolimo (1860–1928) became the chief organizer of the developmental and pedagogical process. Under his leadership, the orphans were divided into two groups. The first group, composed of intellectually disabled children, was under the supervision of a caretaker and several nurses. Upon reaching 18 years of age the children from this group were further divided among specialised psychiatric hospitals. Children with other intellectual disabilities were put in the second group, where they would receive a specialized educational program developed by Rossolimo. The basis of the programme was manufacturing, although other subjects were included. In addition, the shelter studied the nervous systems of the child-patients. It also conducted psychological research. The activity of Rossolimo at the shelter was highly praised by the renowned physician and educator V.P. Kaschenko.

=== During the Soviet Union ===
After the October Revolution, the shelter came under direct management by the state and was converted into an orphanage, under the name "Children's Home No. 13" (Russian: детский дом № 13, romanized: Dyetskii Dom Nomer Trinadtset). From 1925 to 1952, the new director V.P. Knyazeva worked to maintain the pre-revolutionary traditions and achievements. In 1928, the institution was named after Grigory Ivanovich Rossolimo.

During WWII, the children attending the school were evacuated to Bashkortostan, although the school was re-opened in Moscow by 1945.

In 1949, the orphanage moved from the center of Moscow to Izmailovo, into a two-story building with bedrooms and other facilities (the intent was that the children would study in a regular school). In 1976, the orphanage officially became into a G.I. Rossolimo Specialised Boarding School No. 50 for children with intellectual disabilities.

=== After the Soviet Union ===
In 1996, the institution was again reorganized and renamed as the "№ 49 G.I.Rossolimo Boarding School for Orphaned children with Intellectual Disabilities". The old school building gradually fell into disrepair. In 2007 a new complex consisting of three residential buildings, school buildings, administrative block, a sports complex and a medical center, connected by a glass gallery, was built.

== Present ==
The current director of the school is Russian teacher T.A.Tyurina (Russian: Тю́рина Татьяна Александровна). The activities of the teaching staff the school are aimed at effectively teaching children (after the end of 9th grade students are usually issued certificates of basic general education), improving social skills, strengthening their health, and creating a favorable atmosphere for their development, as well as performing medical and educational diagnoses and the research of further effective methods in their pedagogical and medical work. School staff collaborate with scientists from the Department of Defectology MPGU. The school further engages in support of former students to help the graduates to adapt to the modern world.
