= Legion (1998 film) =

1998 American television film

- Written by: Patrick Highsmith; Evan Spiliotopoulos
- Directed by: Jon Hess
- Starring: Parker Stevenson; Terry Farrell; Corey Feldman; Rick Springfield
- Country of origin: United States
- Original language: English

Production
- Producer: Avi Nesher
- Running time: 97 minutes
- Production companies: Conquistador Entertainment; Mahagonny Pictures; The Kushner-Locke Company

Original release
- Release: April 18, 1998

Legion is a 1998 horror television film directed by Jon Hess (aka John Daniel Hess and Jon Daniel Hess) with screenplay by Patrick Highsmith and Evan Spiliotopoulos. It was produced by Avi Nesher for Mahagonny Pictures and Conquistador Entertainment Inc. and aired first on April 18, 1998.

The film stars Terry Farrell (best known for her performances in the television series Star Trek: Deep Space Nine and Becker), Corey Feldman, Rick Springfield and Trevor Goddard.

Nesher is also known for his screenplay Doppelganger (1993) and as director of the HBO films Savage and Mercenary (both 1996).

== Plot ==
The story is set in the year 2036 and revolves around a special forces team led by Major Agatha Doyle (Farrell) formed from death-row prisoners and their ensuing mission.

Captain Aldrich is a former war hero convicted and on death row who is offered the chance at a pardon if he will join the team and undertake their mission to infiltrate an enemy facility. Once they have gained access to the base they are confused by the apparent lack of resistance and upon further inspection they find their enemies bodies piled up in a storeroom. Their state of mind is weakened when they are attacked and some of them are killed without seeing the perpetrator. After finding a computer disk holding information they listen to the account given by the enemy team commander about how events unfolded leading to their enemies demise. Finally it dawns on them that the unknown killer that picked their enemies off one by one is now stalking them. The surviving members of Doyle's team have to try to destroy the demon enemy before it destroys them.

== Cast ==
- Parker Stevenson as Captain Aldrich
- Terry Farrell as Major Agatha Doyle
- Corey Feldman as Siegal
- Rick Springfield as Corporal Ryan
- Troy Donahue as General Flemming
- Audie England as Doctor Jones
- Trevor Goddard as Cutter
