= NUCB International College =

Coordinates: 35°09′03″N 137°05′43″E

- Nisshin, Aichi Prefecture; 470-0193; Japan

Information
- Type: Private boarding school
- Motto: Education for Life and Leadership
- Founded: 1935/4/1
- Founder: Nagoya University of Commerce & Business
- Educational authority: MEXT
- School code: D123310000561(MEXT) 061928(IB)
- Principal: Robert Chaytor
- Faculty: 29
- Grades: Pre-IB year, IB1&2
- Age range: 15-18
- Education system: Full Boarding IB
- Language: English, Japanese
- Website: ic.nucba.ac.jp

NUCB International College, located at Nisshin City, Aichi Prefecture, Japan, is a private boarding school. The school implements leadership education using the case method. It follows a September admission system, with English as the primary language of instruction.

The school is accredited by the Ministry of Education, Culture, Sports, Science and Technology (MEXT) to offer two qualifications: the Japanese high school certificate (as an "Article 1" school) and the International Baccalaureate Diploma Program (IBDP). It is affiliated with Nagoya International Junior and Senior High School, which operates as a day school.

== Overview ==
As part of Aichi's Startup project, the school received approval from Aichi Prefecture on April 1, 2022, to be established as an “Article 1” school, with the aim of providing international high school education to students.

Classes at the school are limited to 25 students, promoting interactive learning and closer teacher-student interaction. The faculty includes members from various countries, and many hold advanced degrees in their respective fields, according to the school’s faculty records. The school employs the case method of education, a participant centered learning approach that encourages critical thinking and group discussions across various subjects.

== High school program ==
The school offers a dual diploma program, allowing students to earn both a Japanese high school diploma and an International Baccalaureate Diploma (IBDP). The Pre-IB year (Grade10) prepares students for the academic rigor of the IBDP, which spans Grades11&12. Students study both the Japanese national curriculum and the IBDP subjects, developing research skills, analytical abilities, and self-management skills. The school also offers a Summer Camp and a Bridging Program, which prepares students for the school’s academic structure.

== International diversity ==
The student body represents a diverse range of nationalities, reflecting the school's international focus. As of 2024, students from 23 countries are enrolled.

== Full-boarding education ==
The school operates a co-educational International House, employing a residential management system that includes a House Director and House Supervisors. Each floor of the residence hall has themed living areas equipped with common facilities such as washrooms, a dining hall, a study room, laundry facilities, and a prayer room. The dormitory is divided by gender, with separate floors for male and female students, and security measures are in place.

The dormitory is designed to house students in a communal living environment with facilities for studying, dining, and socializing. In 2023, the International House was awarded the Good Design Award by the Japan Institute of Design Promotion, recognizing its design and functionality.

== Sport facilities ==
Campus is equipped with a variety of sports facilities, such as tennis courts, a golf range, and areas for traditional Japanese archery.
