= A Separate Peace =

1959 novel by John Knowles

- First edition
- Author: John Knowles
- Language: English
- Genre: Realism
- Publisher: Secker & Warburg
- Publication date: 1959
- Publication place: United States
- Media type: Print (hardback and paperback)
- Pages: 236
- ISBN: 978-0-7432-5397-0

A Separate Peace is a coming-of-age novel by John Knowles, published in 1959. Based on his earlier short story "Phineas", published in the May 1956 issue of Cosmopolitan, it was Knowles's first published novel and became his best-known work. Set against the backdrop of World War II, A Separate Peace explores morality, patriotism, and loss of innocence through its narrator, Gene Forrester, in his relationship with classmate and friend Phineas.

== Plot summary ==
Fifteen years after graduation, Gene Forrester returns to his old prep school, Devon (a potential reflection of Knowles's real-life alma mater, Phillips Exeter Academy), to visit two places he regards as "fearful sites": a flight of stairs, and a big tree by the river. He first examines the stairs, noticing they are made of marble. When he examines the tree, he begins to reflect upon memories of his time as a student at Devon. This opens the reader into the rest of the novel, which follows Gene's life from the summer of 1942 to the summer of 1943. World War II is raging and has a prominent effect on the story's plot and characters.

In 1942, Gene is 16 and living at Devon with his best friend and roommate, Phineas (nicknamed Finny). Despite being opposites in personality, Gene and Finny are surprisingly close friends. Gene's quiet, introverted, intellectual personality is a foil for Finny's extroverted, carefree athleticism. One of Finny's ideas during their "gypsy summer" of 1942 is to create a "Super Suicide Society of the Summer Session", with Gene and himself as charter members. Finny creates a rite of initiation by having members jump into the Devon River from a large, tall tree. At one point, both Gene and Finny are in the tree. Gene nearly falls, but Finny grabs him, saving his life and creating resentment. Gene is even more resentful of how often Finny breaks rules and gets off easy, both because of his charm and because the school staff is too occupied with the war effort to notice or care.

Gene and Finny's friendship goes through a period of one-sided rivalry during which Gene strives to outdo Finny academically, as he believes Finny is trying to outdo him athletically. The rivalry begins with Gene's envy toward Finny. It climaxes and ends when, as Finny and Gene are about to jump from the tree, Gene impulsively jounces the limb they are on. Finny falls and shatters his leg, which permanently disables him. Finny learns that he will never again be able to compete in sports, which he loves.

Finny's "accident" inspires Gene to think more like his friend and become a better person, free of envy. The rest of the story revolves around Gene's attempts to come to grips with who he is, why he shook the branch, and how he will proceed. Gene feels so guilty that he eventually tells Finny he caused the fall. At first, Finny does not believe Gene, but then comes to feel extremely hurt.

World War II soon occupies the boys' time, with fellow student Brinker Hadley rallying the boys to help the war effort. Gene's quiet friend Leper Lepellier joins the Ski Troops, but chooses to go AWOL after learning he is about to be discharged from the military under Section 8 for being unable to sleep and suffering hallucinations during basic training. Having a Section 8 discharge on his record would have rendered him unhireable in the eyes of the public, with Leper saying it would have him "screwed for life", and a dishonorable discharge would be better.

During a meeting of the Golden Fleece Debating Society, Brinker sets up a show trial of sorts and, based on Gene's shaking of the branch, accuses Gene of trying to kill Finny. Faced with the evidence, Finny leaves shamefully before Gene's deed is confirmed. On his way out, Finny falls down a flight of stairs (the same ones Gene visited at the beginning of the novel) and re-breaks his injured leg. Finny at first dismisses Gene's attempts to apologize, but soon realizes the "accident" was impulsive and not premeditated or based on anger. The two forgive each other.

The next day, Finny dies during surgery to set the bone when bone marrow enters his bloodstream.

After they graduate, Gene and Brinker enlist in the Navy and the Coast Guard. Gene observes that many people lash out at others to protect themselves from their own insecurities. The only person he knew who did not do that was Finny, the only person Gene knew to be truly honest and the only person he knew never to have an internal war to fight. Back in the present, an older Gene muses on peace, war, and enemies.

== Characters ==
- Gene Forrester: A Separate Peace is told from Gene's point of view. He focuses on and succeeds at academics. He envies his roommate and best friend Finny's graceful, easy athleticism and social prowess but also admires these very features. Gene is from "three states from Texas;” being somewhat unaccustomed to Northeastern culture, he is an outsider of sorts at Devon. Gene shakes a branch which causes his best friend, Finny, to fall from a tree and break his leg, but it is ambiguous whether the move is deliberate or not.
- Phineas (Finny): Gene's friend and roommate; an incorrigible, good-natured, carefree, athletic, daredevil type. In Gene's opinion, Finny can never leave anything well enough alone and can always get away with anything. He always sees the best in others, seeks internal fulfilment free of accolades, and shapes the world around himself to fit his desires. He is a prodigious athlete, who succeeds in every sport until his leg is shattered in his fall from the tree. Phineas was based on David Hackett and that the house in the book was 848 High Street in Dedham, Massachusetts.
- Brinker Hadley: Brinker is a classmate and friend of Gene and Finny. He ceaselessly strives for order during the Winter Session at Devon. Brinker wants to get to the bottom of Finny's accident, but it is unclear if he intended for the investigation to be a practical joke. He organizes the "midnight trial" to confront and to accuse Gene of causing Finny's accident. During the questioning of Finny by Brinker, Finny changes the story to make Gene appear innocent of his actions in the tree. Finny cites Lepellier as an unreachable witness. Brinker ultimately reconciles with Gene, who appears to forgive him both for his part in Finny's injury and for the trial. Brinker was based on Knowles' Phillips Exeter Academy classmate and friend Gore Vidal.
- Elwin "Leper" Lepellier: Leper is Finny and Gene's friend and a key member of the Super Suicide Society of the Summer Session. He is the first student in his class to enlist in the military. Late in the novel, Leper enlists in the Ski Troops, but goes AWOL to avoid a Section 8 discharge. He is a witness at Gene's "trial" and testifies that he saw someone jounce the limb when Finny fell but does not state who did it because he hates Brinker and thinks it is a trap.

== Themes, motifs and symbols ==
A Separate Peace contains many themes, motifs and symbols, which occur throughout the book. Some of them are present throughout the book, like the tree Finny falls off and the presence and significance of sport. Other themes exist as part of Gene's consciousness and his relationship with Finny, such as the threat of codependency and the creation of inner enemies. In addition, there are many ambiguous factors that remain unresolved, such as the reliability of Gene as a narrator and whether Gene was responsible for the fall.

=== Co-dependency and identity ===
The central relationship between Gene and Finny is a model of codependency. After the fall, the two become reliant on each other for fulfilment. Gene's submissive nature leads to his lacking a strong identity without Finny. Finny, with his free, sport-loving spirit, can only be fulfilled by experiencing the sport through Gene after the fall. That is furthered by the characters' notion that World War II is merely a conspiracy, which creates a private illusion in which both Finny and Gene can exist together. Towards the end of the book, after Finny's death, Gene notes that he feels Finny's funeral is his own, as so much of his identity rests upon Finny.

=== Athletics and blitzball ===
Athletics comprise a key part of Finny's personality. He views them as an expression of achievement and believes there are no winners or losers. That is epitomized by Finny's breaking of the school swimming record, which he does not feel the need to publicise, and Blitzball, a game that Finny spontaneously invents that has no winners or losers, which Finny excels at as it requires pure athleticism rather than focusing on defeat of opponents.

=== Summer and Winter Sessions ===
The Summer Session at Devon School is defined by freedom, lack of rules and little academic study. This symbolises innocence and youth, which is "lost" when Finny falls from the tree, giving lead to the Winter Session. The Winter Session is defined as the polar opposite of the Summer Session: tight rules, rigorous study, little freedom and a cold and unforgiving atmosphere. The Sessions represent the shift from carefree youth to adulthood and maturity, a theme that occurs throughout the novel.

=== Finny's fall ===
Finny's fall from the tree marks the climax of the novel. It is both a literal and a symbolic fall. The literal fall has a knock-on effect of no sports for Finny, which leads to a loss of independence and identity. The symbolic fall represents a fall from innocence and from youth, and the beginning of the end of Finny and Gene's friendship. The fall can be interpreted as having biblical allusions; like Adam and Eve, Finny and Gene existed in a carefree, idyllic setting, epitomized by innocence (like Eden), which is tainted by a force of darkness (the snake or Gene's growing resentment) and then is shattered by a fall from innocence (the fall from the tree).

=== Implied homoerotic undertones ===
Various parties have asserted that the novel implies homoeroticism between Gene and Finny, including those who endorse a queer reading of the novel and those who condemn homosexuality as immoral. For example, the book was challenged in the Vernon-Verona-Sherill, NY School District (1980) as a "filthy, trashy sex novel" despite having no substantial female characters and describing no sexual activity.

Though frequently taught in US high schools, curricula related to A Separate Peace typically ignore a possible homoerotic reading in favor of engaging with the book as a historical novel or coming-of-age story. Knowles denied any such intentions, stating in a 1987 newspaper interview:

Freud said any strong relationship between two men contains a homoerotic element... If so, in this case, both characters are totally unaware of it. It would have changed everything, it wouldn't have been the same story. In that time and place, my characters would have behaved totally differently... If there had been homoeroticism between Phineas and Gene, I would have put it in the book, I assure you. It simply wasn't there.

== Adaptations ==
The novel has been adapted into two films of the same name. The first, starring Parker Stevenson as Gene and John Heyl as Finny, with a screenplay by Fred Segal and John Knowles, was released in 1972. The second, directed by Peter Yates, with a screenplay by Wendy Kesselman, was released in 2004.

== Awards and honors ==
- 1960 New York Times bestseller (Fiction)
- 1961 William Faulkner Foundation Award, inaugural winner
- 1961 National Book Award finalist (Fiction)
