= Parker Stevenson =

American actor (born 1952)

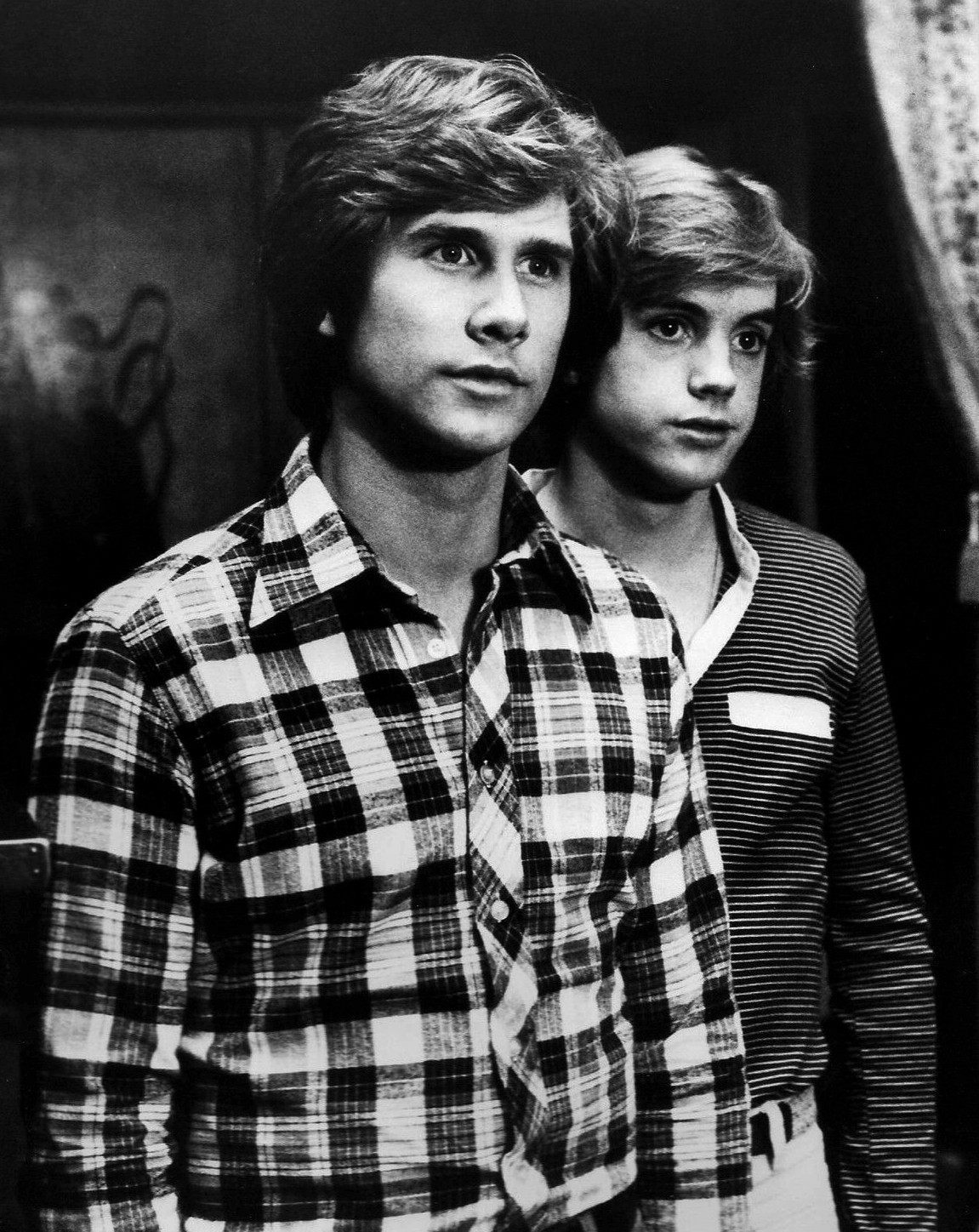
- Stevenson (left) with Shaun Cassidy as The Hardy Boys in 1977
- Born: Richard Stevenson Parker Jr. June 4, 1952 (age 74); Philadelphia, Pennsylvania, U.S.
- Education: Brooks School
- Alma mater: Princeton University
- Occupation: Actor
- Years active: 1972–present
- Known for: The Hardy Boys/Nancy Drew Mysteries; Baywatch
- Spouses: Kirstie Alley (m. 1983; div. 1997); Lisa Schoen (m. 2018)
- Children: 2

Richard Stevenson Parker Jr. (born June 4, 1952), known professionally as Parker Stevenson, is an American actor best known for playing Frank Hardy in the 1970s series The Hardy Boys and Craig Pomeroy on the 1990s series Baywatch.

== Early life ==
Parker Stevenson was born on the Main Line of Philadelphia, on June 4, 1952, as Richard Stevenson Parker Jr., one of two sons of Richard Stevenson Parker Sr., an investment advisor, and Sarah Meade, an actress who worked on Broadway and in television commercials. Meade took him to a filming session when he was five years old, which resulted in him making two small television appearances. The elder Parker moved his family to Rye, New York and disapproved of the whole business. Richard Jr. appeared in a few plays at Brooks Preparatory School, but initially had no intention of becoming an actor and wanted to be an architect.

== Career ==
Stevenson's first notable screen appearance was a starring role in the 1972 movie A Separate Peace, credited as Parker Stevenson. After graduating from Brooks School and Princeton University, where he studied architecture, he moved to Hollywood and landed a supporting role opposite Sam Elliott in the 1976 film Lifeguard.

Stevenson became well known from starring with teen heartthrob Shaun Cassidy in The Hardy Boys/Nancy Drew Mysteries series, produced by Glen A. Larson's production company through MCA-Universal Television (now NBCUniversal) under license from the Stratemeyer Publication Syndicate, from 1977 to 1979 on ABC. In 1983, he co-starred in the movie Stroker Ace as Stroker Ace (Burt Reynolds)'s brash race-car driving nemesis, Aubrey James. The film was a critical and financial failure.

In 1986, Stevenson starred as Billy Hazard in the television miniseries North and South. He co-starred with then-wife Kirstie Alley, who portrayed his sister Virgilia Hazard. He starred on the short-lived 1988 series Probe in the lead role of Austin James. He was part of the original cast of Baywatch in the 1989 season, returning for the syndicated 1997 and 1998 seasons. He had a recurring role as Steve McMillan, a computer tycoon on Melrose Place during the second season. He starred in the 1998 horror film Legion. In 2014, he had a guest role on the Western/mystery series Longmire.

Stevenson has been a photographer since he was young; his work can be found at his photography website.

From 2017 to 2020, he starred on Greenhouse Academy as Louis Osmond, Academy Director.

== Personal life ==
Stevenson married his first wife, actress Kirstie Alley, on December 22, 1983, and they divorced in 1997. They adopted two children: a son in 1992 and a daughter in 1995.

Stevenson married celebrity chef Lisa Schoen on September 29, 2018, at Demetria Vineyards in Los Olivos, California.

== Filmography ==
Film
Year	Title	Role	Notes
1972	A Separate Peace	Gene Forrester	
1974	Our Time	Michael Brooks	Alternative title: Death of Her Innocence
1976	Lifeguard	Chris Randall	
1983	Stroker Ace	Aubrey James	
1985	Stitches	Bobby Stevens	
1995	Not of This Earth	Officer Jack Sherbourne	
2008	Loaded	Ben Ryan	
2014	McTaggart's Fortune	Richard Heywood	
2015	Perfect Disguise	General William Tecumseh Sherman	
2015	His Secret Family	Detective Daniel Sharpson	
2016	The War Riders	General Sherman	
2016	Hidden Truth	Sheriff Underwood	
2018	Mistrust	Brandon McKellan	
2019	American Confederate	General Sherman	
2021	Last Call in the Dog House	Simon	
Television
Year	Title	Role	Notes
1974	Gunsmoke	Steven	Episode: "To Ride a Yeller Horse"
1976	The Streets of San Francisco	Andy Horvath	Episode: "The Drop"
1977–1979	The Hardy Boys/Nancy Drew Mysteries	Frank Hardy	Main role (46 episodes)
1978	Donny & Marie	Himself	Episode: "3.16"
1981	This House Possessed	Gary Straihorn	Television film
1983	The Love Boat	Bill Watkins/Matt Stevens	3 episodes
1983	Shooting Stars	Bill O'Keefe	Television film pilot
1984	Hotel	Michael	Episode: "Confrontations"
1984–1985	Falcon Crest	Joel McCarthy	11 episodes
1985	Rockhopper	Nick Larabee	Television film
1985	Alfred Hitchcock Presents	Lance Richards	Episode: "Method Actor"
1985	Murder, She Wrote	Michael Digby	Episode: "Sticks and Stones"
1986	North and South	Billy Hazard	Miniseries
1986	That Secret Sunday	Scott Dennis	Television film
1987	Matlock	Dr. Philip Eagen	Episode: "The Author"
1987	The Hitchhiker	Brett	Episode: "Best Shot"
1987	Shades of Love: The Rose Cafe	Josh	Television film
1988	Mission: Impossible	Champ Foster	Episode: "The Haunting"
1988	Alfred Hitchcock Presents	Clark Taylor	Episode: "Prosecutor"
1988	Probe	Austin James	Main role (8 episodes)
1989	The Cover Girl and the Cop	Cable Hayward	Television film, uncredited
1989	Baywatch: Panic at Malibu Pier	Craig Pomeroy	Television film pilot
1989	Caddie Woodlawn	Uncle Edmund Grey	Television film
1989–1999	Baywatch	Craig Pomeroy	Main cast (28 episodes)
1990	All the Rivers Run II	Cyrus P. James	Television film
1991	Flesh 'n' Blood	Jeffrey Hazelwood	Episode: "Tall, Dark and Wanted in Four States"
1992	Blossom	Jim/Scott Alexander	Episode: "Hot for Teacher"
1992	Are You Lonesome Tonight?	Mat Henderson	Television film
1992	Shadow of a Stranger	Ted Clinton	Television film
1993	Melrose Place	Steve McMillan	6 episodes
1993	Official Denial	Paul Corliss	Television film
1994	Burke's Law	Ted Cranshaw	Episode: "Who Killed Good Time Charlie?"
1998	Legion	Captain Aldrich	Television film
1999	Avalon: Beyond the Abyss	Commander John Alden	Television film; also executive producer
2000	Batman Beyond	Paxton Powers	Voice, episode: "King's Ransom"
2001	Trapped	Oliver Sloan	Television film
2002	Judging Amy	Andrew Pickeral	Episode: "Who Shot Dick?"
2002	The District	Mr. Skols	Episode: "Convictions"
2003	Terror Peak	Kevin Fraser	Television film
2005–2006	Hunter Hunted	Narrator	9 episodes
2010	Legend of the Seeker	The Margrave	Episode: "Princess"
2014	Longmire	Welles VanBlarcom	Episode: "Reports of My Death"
2015	Win, Lose or Love	Mike Canton	Television film
2015	A Christmas Reunion	Don Dupree	Television film
2016	The Perfect Daughter	Bruce Cahill	Television film
2016	Bull	Gavin Everton	Episode: "Just Tell the Truth"
2017	My Christmas Prince	Jim Logan	Television film
2017–2020	Greenhouse Academy	Louis Osmond	Main cast (40 episodes)
