= John Knowles =

American novelist

- Knowles photographed for Esquire Magazine on the 25th anniversary for "A Separate Peace", March 1985
- Born: September 16, 1926; Fairmont, West Virginia, U.S.
- Died: November 29, 2001 (aged 75); Fort Lauderdale, Florida, U.S.
- Education: Yale University; Phillips Exeter Academy
- Occupation: Writer
- Known for: Peace Breaks Out (1981); A Separate Peace (1959)
- Awards: William Faulkner Foundation Award (1961) Rosenthal Award of the National Institute of Arts and Letters.

John Knowles (/noʊlz/; September 16, 1926 – November 29, 2001) was an American novelist best known for A Separate Peace (1959).

== Biography ==
Knowles was born on September 16, 1926, in Fairmont, West Virginia, the son of James M. Knowles, a purchasing agent from Lowell, Massachusetts, and Mary Beatrice Shea Knowles from Concord, New Hampshire. His father was a coal company executive, which earned an income that afforded the family a comfortable living. As a youth, Knowles would remark that he could write just as well as the stories from The Saturday Evening Post.

Knowles attended St. Peter's High School in Fairmont from 1938 to 1940, before he continued at Phillips Exeter Academy in Exeter, New Hampshire, and graduated in 1945. Following his time at Phillips Exeter, Knowles spent eight months serving in the US Army Air Forces at the end of World War II.

Knowles graduated from Yale University as a member of the class of 1949. At Yale, Knowles contributed stories to campus humor magazine The Yale Record and served on the board of the Yale Daily News during his sophomore, junior, and senior years, notably as editorial secretary during his senior year. He was a record-holding varsity swimmer during his sophomore year.

Early in his career, Knowles wrote for the Hartford Courant and was assistant editor for Holiday magazine. With encouragement from Thornton Wilder, he concurrently began writing novels.

Knowles died on November 29, 2001, near Fort Lauderdale, Florida.

== A Separate Peace ==
A Separate Peace was first published in London by Secker and Warburg in 1959. Published in New York in 1960 by Macmillan, it is his most celebrated work.

The novel is based upon Knowles's experiences at Phillips Exeter Academy. The Devon School, the book's setting, is a thinly veiled fictionalization of Exeter, with both campus and town easily recognizable. Although the plot is not autobiographical, elements of the novel stem from personal experience, including Knowles's membership in a secret society and his suffering a foot injury while he jumped from a tree during society exercises. In his essay "A Special Time, A Special Place," Knowles wrote, "The only elements in A Separate Peace which were not in that summer were anger, violence, and hatred. There was only friendship, athleticism, and loyalty."

The secondary character Finny (Phineas) is the friend of the main character Gene. Knowles has stated that he modeled Finny on David Hackett from Milton Academy, whom he met when both attended a summer session at Phillips Exeter Academy. Hackett was a friend of Robert F. Kennedy under whom he later served in the US Justice Department. A student, Phineas Sprague, lived in the same dormitory as Knowles during the summer session of 1943 and may have inspired the character's name.

In his memoir Palimpsest, Gore Vidal acknowledged that he and Knowles simultaneously attended Phillips Exeter Academy, though Vidal was two years ahead of Knowles. Vidal stated that Knowles told him the character Brinker was based on him. "We have been friends for many years now," Vidal said, "and I admire the novel that he based on our school days, A Separate Peace."

== Awards ==
Knowles won the PEN/Faulkner Award for Fiction and the Rosenthal Award of the National Institute of Arts and Letters.

== Selected works ==
- "A Turn with the Sun" (short story), Story: The Magazine of the Short Story, Number 4, 1953
- "Phineas" (short story), Cosmopolitan, May, 1956
- A Separate Peace (novel), London, Secker & Warburg, 1959; New York, Macmillan Co., 1960
- Morning in Antibes (novel), New York, Macmillan, 1962
- Double Vision; American Thoughts Abroad, New York, Macmillan, 1964
- Indian Summer, New York, Random House, 1966
- Phineas. Six Stories, New York, Random House, 1968
- The Paragon (novel), New York, Random House, 1971
- "Rapture of the Deep" (short story), 1972
- Spreading Fires, New York, Random House, 1974
- A Vein of Riches, Boston, Little Brown, 1978
- Peace Breaks Out (novel), New York, Holt, Rinehart and Winston, 1981
- A Stolen Past, New York, Holt, Rinehart and Winston, 1983
- The Private Life of Axie Reed, New York : John Knowles, 1986
- A Special Time, A Special Place, Exeter Bulletin, 1995 (autobiographical note on internet)
