= Meetings, Bloody Meetings =

1976 British comedy movie starring John Cleese

Meetings, Bloody Meetings is a 1976 British comedy training film that stars John Cleese as a bumbling middle manager. The film was written by John Cleese and Antony Jay, and was produced by Cleese's production company Video Arts. It was followed by More Bloody Meetings.

Video Arts released an updated version of the film in 2012 with British comedian Will Smith starring as the central character in charge of a meeting. John Cleese is the judge in the dream sequence in the new version.

== Summary of correct meeting method from the film ==
1. Plan - precise objectives and list subjects
2. Inform - everyone must know what, why and goals.
3. Prepare - logical sequence of items and time allocation
4. Structure and control - evidence, interpretation then action. Stop jumping ahead or cycling back
5. Summarize and record - decisions recorded and actions assigned
