= More Bloody Meetings =

More Bloody Meetings is a 1984 British comedy training film that stars John Cleese as a bumbling middle manager. The film was directed by Charles Crichton and written by Antony Jay. It is a followup to Meetings, Bloody Meetings. It was produced by Cleese's production company Video Arts.
