= John Cleese =

English comedian and actor (born 1939)

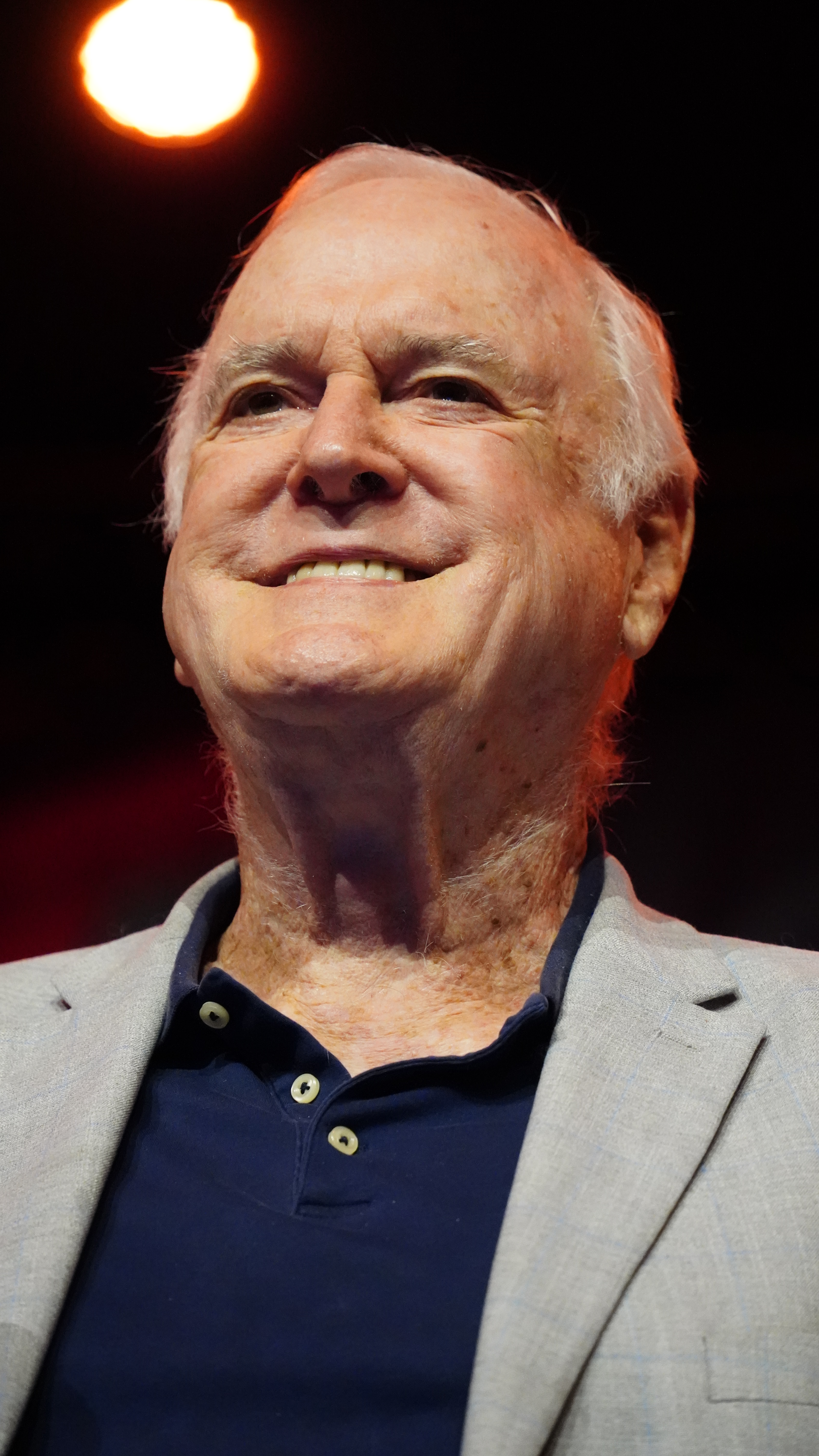
- Cleese in 2026
- Born: John Marwood Cleese; 27 October 1939 (age 87); Weston-super-Mare, Somerset, England
- Education: University of Cambridge
- Occupations: Actor; comedian; screenwriter; producer; televsion presenter
- Years active: 1961–present
- Spouses: Connie Booth (m. 1968; div. 1978) Barbara Trentham (m. 1981; div. 1990) Alyce Eichelberger (m. 1992; div. 2008) Jennifer Wade (m. 2012)
- Children: 2
- Website: johncleese.com

John Marwood Cleese (/ˈkliːz/ KLEEZ; born 27 October 1939) is an English actor, comedian, screenwriter, producer, and television presenter. Emerging from the Cambridge Footlights in the 1960s, he first achieved success at the Edinburgh Festival Fringe and as a scriptwriter and performer on The Frost Report (1966–1967). In the late 1960s, he cofounded Monty Python, the comedy troupe that created the surreal sketch comedy series Monty Python's Flying Circus (1969–1974). Along with his Python costars Graham Chapman, Terry Gilliam, Eric Idle, Terry Jones and Michael Palin, Cleese starred in the films Monty Python and the Holy Grail (1975), Life of Brian (1979), and The Meaning of Life (1983).

Cleese and his first wife Connie Booth cowrote the television sitcom Fawlty Towers (1975–1979), in which he starred as hotel owner Basil Fawlty, which earned him the 1980 British Academy Television Award for Best Entertainment Performance. In 2000, the show topped the BFI TV 100, and in a 2001 Channel 4 poll, Basil was ranked second on its list of the 100 Greatest TV Characters.

Cleese wrote and starred in the heist comedy film A Fish Called Wanda (1988), for which he received Academy Award, British Academy Film Award, and Golden Globe award nominations, and its quasi-sequel Fierce Creatures (1997). He has also starred in Time Bandits (1981), Silverado (1985), Clockwise (1986), Mary Shelley's Frankenstein (1994), George of the Jungle (1997), Rat Race (2001), Charlie's Angels: Full Throttle (2003), and The Day the Earth Stood Still (2008). His prominent franchise film roles include R and Q in the James Bond films The World Is Not Enough (1999) and Die Another Day (2002), Nearly Headless Nick in Harry Potter and the Philosopher's Stone (2001) and Harry Potter and the Chamber of Secrets (2002), and the last three Shrek films (2004–2010). He received a Primetime Emmy Award for Outstanding Guest Actor in a Comedy Series for Cheers (1987) and was nominated for 3rd Rock from the Sun (1998) and Will & Grace (2004).

Cleese has specialised in political and religious satire, dark humour, sketch comedy, and surreal humour. He was ranked the second best comedian ever in a 2005 Channel 4 poll of fellow comedians. He cofounded Video Arts, a production company making entertaining training films as well as The Secret Policeman's Ball benefit shows to raise funds for the human rights organisation Amnesty International. Formerly a staunch supporter of the Liberal Democrats, in 1999, he turned down an offer from the party to nominate him for a life peerage.

== Early life and education ==
John Marwood Cleese was born on 27 October 1939 in Weston-super-Mare, Somerset, England, the only child of Reginald Francis Cleese (1893–1972), an insurance salesman, and his wife Muriel Evelyn (née Cross, 1899–2000), the daughter of an auctioneer. His family's surname was originally Cheese, but his father had thought it was embarrassing and used the name Cleese when he enlisted in the Army during the First World War; he changed it officially by deed poll in 1923. Cleese's grandfather, John E. Cheese, was a solicitor's clerk in Bristol. As a child, Cleese supported Bristol City Football Club and Somerset County Cricket Club. Cleese was educated at St Peter's Preparatory School, paid for by money his mother had inherited, where he received a prize for English and did well at cricket and boxing. When he was 13, he was awarded an exhibition at Clifton College, a public school in Bristol. By that age, he was more than 6 feet (1.83 m) tall.

The biggest influence was The Goon Show. Kids were devoted to it. It was written by Spike Milligan. It also had Peter Sellers in it, who of course is the greatest voice man of all time. In the morning, we'd be at school and we'd discuss the whole thing and rehash the jokes and talk about it. We were obsessed with it.

— Cleese on his greatest comedic influence growing up, 1950s BBC Radio comedy The Goon Show.

Cleese allegedly defaced the school grounds, as a prank, by painting footprints to suggest that the statue of Field Marshal Earl Haig had left its plinth and gone to the toilet. Cleese played cricket in the First XI and did well academically, passing eight O-Levels and three A-levels in mathematics, physics and chemistry. In his autobiography So, Anyway, he says that discovering, aged 17, he had not been made a house prefect by his housemaster affected his outlook: "It was not fair and therefore it was unworthy of my respect... I believe that this moment changed my perspective on the world."

Cleese could not go straight to the University of Cambridge, as the ending of National Service meant there were twice the usual number of applicants for places, so he returned to his prep school for two years to teach science, English, geography, history, and Latin (he drew on his Latin teaching experience later for a scene in Monty Python's Life of Brian, in which he corrects Brian's badly written Latin graffiti). He then took up a place he had won at Downing College, Cambridge, to read law. He also joined the Cambridge Footlights. He recalled that he went to the Cambridge Guildhall, where each university society had a stall, and went up to the Footlights stall, where he was asked if he could sing or dance. He replied "no" as he was not allowed to sing at his school because he was so bad, and if there was anything worse than his singing, it was his dancing. He was then asked "Well, what do you do?" to which he replied, "I make people laugh."

At the Footlights theatrical club, Cleese spent a lot of time with Tim Brooke-Taylor and Bill Oddie and met his future writing partner Graham Chapman. Cleese wrote extra material for the 1961 Footlights Revue I Thought I Saw It Move, and was registrar for the Footlights Club during 1962. He was also in the cast of the 1962 Footlights Revue Double Take! Cleese graduated from Cambridge in 1963 with an upper second. Despite his successes on The Frost Report, his father sent him cuttings from The Daily Telegraph offering management jobs in places such as Marks & Spencer.

== Career ==
=== 1963–1968: Pre-Python ===
Cleese was a scriptwriter, as well as a cast member, for the 1963 Footlights Revue A Clump of Plinths. The revue was so successful at the Edinburgh Festival Fringe that it was renamed Cambridge Circus and taken to the West End in London and then on a tour of New Zealand and Broadway, with the cast also appearing in some of the revue's sketches on The Ed Sullivan Show in October 1964.

After Cambridge Circus, Cleese briefly stayed in America, performing on and off-Broadway. While performing in the musical Half a Sixpence, Cleese met future Python Terry Gilliam as well as American actress Connie Booth, whom he married on 20 February 1968. At their wedding at a Unitarian church in Manhattan, the couple attempted to ensure an absence of any theistic language. "The only moment of disappointment", Cleese recalled, "came at the very end of the service when I discovered that I'd failed to excise one particular mention of the word 'God'." Later, Booth became a writing partner. Cleese was soon offered work as a writer with BBC Radio, where he worked on several programmes, most notably as a sketch writer for The Dick Emery Show. The success of the Footlights Revue led to the recording of a short series of half-hour radio programmes, called I'm Sorry, I'll Read That Again, which were so popular that the BBC commissioned a regular series with the same title that ran from 1965 to 1974. Cleese returned to Britain and joined the cast. In many episodes, he is credited as "John Otto Cleese" (according to Jem Roberts, this may have been due to the embarrassment of his actual middle name, "Marwood").

Also in 1965, Cleese and Chapman began writing on The Frost Report. The writing staff chosen for the programme consisted of a number of writers and performers who went on to make names for themselves in comedy. They included co-performers from I'm Sorry, I'll Read That Again and future Goodies Bill Oddie and Tim Brooke-Taylor, and also Frank Muir, Barry Cryer, Marty Feldman, Ronnie Barker, Ronnie Corbett, and Dick Vosburgh and future Python members Eric Idle, Terry Jones, and Michael Palin. While working on The Frost Report, the future Pythons developed the writing styles that would make their collaboration significant. Cleese's and Chapman's sketches often involved authority figures, some of whom were performed by Cleese, while Jones and Palin were both infatuated with filmed scenes that opened with idyllic countryside panoramas. Idle was one of those charged with writing David Frost's monologue. During this period Cleese met and befriended influential British comedian Peter Cook, eventually collaborating with Cook on several projects and forming a close friendship that lasted until Cook's death in 1995.

It was as a performer on The Frost Report that Cleese achieved his breakthrough on British television as a comedy actor, appearing as the tall, upper class patrician figure in the classic "Class" sketch (screened on 7 April 1966), contrasting comically in a line-up with the shorter, middle class Ronnie Barker and the even shorter, working class Ronnie Corbett. The British Film Institute commented, "Its twinning of height and social position, combined with a minimal script, created a classic TV moment." The series was so popular that in 1966 Cleese and Chapman were invited to work as writers and performers with Brooke-Taylor and Feldman on At Last the 1948 Show, during which time the "Four Yorkshiremen sketch" was written by all four writers/performers (the "Four Yorkshiremen" sketch is now better known as a Monty Python sketch).

Cleese and Chapman also wrote episodes for the first series of Doctor in the House (and later Cleese wrote six episodes of Doctor at Large on his own in 1971). These series were successful, and in 1969 Cleese and Chapman were offered their very own series. However, owing to Chapman's alcoholism, Cleese found himself bearing an increasing workload in the partnership and was, therefore, unenthusiastic about doing a series with just the two of them. He had found working with Palin on The Frost Report an enjoyable experience and invited him to join the series. Palin had previously been working on Do Not Adjust Your Set with Idle and Jones, with Terry Gilliam creating the animations. The four of them had, on the back of the success of Do Not Adjust Your Set, been offered a series for Thames Television, which they were waiting to begin when Cleese's offer arrived. Palin agreed to work with Cleese and Chapman in the meantime, bringing with him Gilliam, Jones, and Idle.

=== 1969–1983: Monty Python ===
Monty Python's Flying Circus ran for four series from October 1969 to December 1974 on BBC Television, though Cleese quit the show after the third. Cleese's two primary characterisations were as a sophisticate and a loony. He portrayed the former as a series of announcers, TV show hosts, and government officials (for example, "The Ministry of Silly Walks"). The latter is perhaps best represented in the "Cheese Shop" and by Cleese's Mr Praline character, the man with a dead Norwegian Blue parrot and a menagerie of other animals all named "Eric". He was also known for his working class "Sergeant Major" character, who worked as a Police Sergeant, Roman Centurion, etc. Cleese also appeared during some abrupt scene changes as a radio commentator (usually outfitted in a dinner suit) where, in a rather pompous manner, he would make the formal and determined announcement "And now for something completely different", which later became the title of the first Monty Python film.

Partnership with Graham Chapman

He was the greatest sounding board I've ever had. If Graham thought something was funny, then it almost certainly was funny. You cannot believe how invaluable that is.

— Cleese on Chapman in The Pythons Autobiography by The Pythons (2003).

Along with Gilliam's animations, Cleese's work with Graham Chapman provided Python with its darkest and angriest moments, and many of his characters display the seething suppressed rage that later characterised his portrayal of Basil Fawlty.

Unlike Palin and Jones, Cleese and Chapman wrote together in the same room; Cleese claims that their writing partnership involved him doing most of the work, while Chapman sat back, not speaking for long periods before suddenly coming out with an idea that often elevated the sketch to a new level. A classic example of this is the "Dead Parrot sketch", envisaged by Cleese as a satire on poor customer service, which was originally to have involved a broken toaster and later a broken car (this version was actually performed and broadcast on the pre-Python special How to Irritate People). It was Chapman's suggestion to change the faulty item into a dead parrot, and he also suggested that the parrot be specifically a "Norwegian Blue", giving the sketch a surreal air which made it far more memorable.

Their humour often involved ordinary people in ordinary situations behaving absurdly for no obvious reason. Like Chapman, Cleese's poker face, clipped middle-class accent, and intimidating height allowed him to appear convincingly as a variety of authority figures, such as policemen, detectives, Nazi officers or government officials, which he then proceeded to undermine. In the "Ministry of Silly Walks" sketch (written by Palin and Jones), for example, Cleese exploits his stature as the crane-legged civil servant performing a grotesquely elaborate walk to his office. On the Silly Walks sketch, Ben Beaumont-Thomas in The Guardian writes, "Cleese is utterly deadpan as he takes the stereotypical bowler-hatted political drone and ruthlessly skewers him. All the self-importance, bureaucratic inefficiency and laughable circuitousness of Whitehall is summed up in one balletic extension of his slender leg."

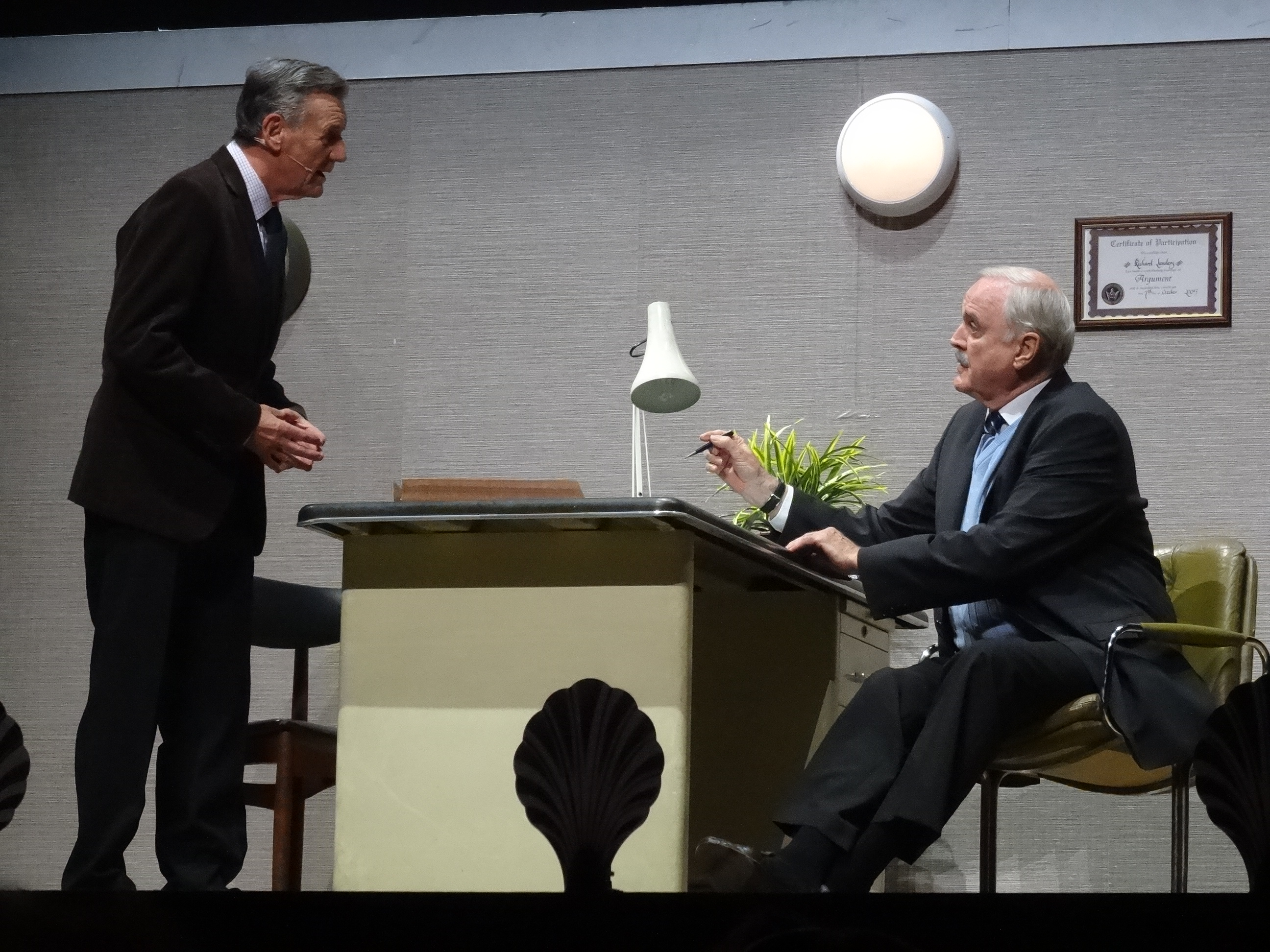
"Argument Clinic" sketch with Palin (standing) at Monty Python Live (Mostly), in 2014

Chapman and Cleese also specialised in sketches wherein two characters conducted highly articulate arguments over completely arbitrary subjects, such as in the "cheese shop", the "dead parrot" sketch and "Argument Clinic", where Cleese plays a stone-faced bureaucrat employed to sit behind a desk and engage people in pointless, trivial bickering. All of these roles were opposite Palin (who Cleese often claims is his favourite Python to work with)—the comic contrast between the towering Cleese's crazed aggression and the shorter Palin's shuffling inoffensiveness is a common feature in the series. Occasionally, the typical Cleese–Palin dynamic is reversed, as in "Fish Licence", wherein Palin plays the bureaucrat with whom Cleese is trying to work.

Though Flying Circus lasted four series, by the start of series 3, Cleese was growing tired of dealing with Chapman's alcoholism. He felt, too, that the show's scripts had declined in quality. For these reasons, he became restless and decided to move on. Though he stayed for the third series, he officially left the group before the fourth season. Cleese received a credit on three episodes of the fourth series which used material from these sessions, though he was officially unconnected with the fourth series. He remained friendly with the group, and all six began writing Monty Python and the Holy Grail. Much of his work on Holy Grail remains widely quoted, including the Black Knight scene. Cleese returned to the troupe to co-write and co-star in two further Monty Python films, Monty Python's Life of Brian and Monty Python's The Meaning of Life. His attack on Roman rule in Life of Brian–when he asks "What have the Romans ever done for us?", before being met with a string of benefits including sanitation, roads and public order–was ranked the seventh funniest line in film in a 2002 poll. Since the last Python film (Meaning of Life in 1983) Cleese has participated in various live performances with the group over the years.

=== 1970–1979: Fawlty Towers ===
From 1970 to 1973, Cleese served as rector of the University of St Andrews. His election proved a milestone for the university, revolutionising and modernising the post. For instance, the rector was traditionally entitled to appoint an "assessor", a deputy to sit in his place at important meetings in his absence. Cleese changed this into a position for a student, elected across campus by the student body, resulting in direct access and representation for the student body.

Around this time, Cleese worked with comedian Les Dawson on his sketch/stand-up show Sez Les. The differences between the two physically (the tall, lean Cleese and the short, stout Dawson) and socially (the public school and Cambridge-educated Cleese vs. the working class, self-educated Mancunian Dawson) were marked, but both worked well together from series 8 onwards until the series ended in 1976.

Cleese appeared on a single, "Superspike", with Bill Oddie and a group of UK athletes, billed the "Superspike Squad", to fund the latter's attendance at the 1976 Summer Olympics in Montreal.

Cleese starred in the low-budget spoof of the Sherlock Holmes detective series The Strange Case of the End of Civilization as We Know It (1977) as the grandson of the world's greatest consulting detective. In December 1977, Cleese appeared as a guest star on The Muppet Show. Ranked one of the best guest stars to appear on the show, Cleese was a fan of The Muppet Show and co-wrote much of the episode. In it he is "kidnapped" before the show begins, complains about the number of pigs, and gets roped into doing a closing number with Kermit the Frog, Sweetums, pigs, chickens and monsters. Cleese also made a cameo appearance in their 1981 film The Great Muppet Caper and won the TV Times award for Funniest Man on TV – 1978–79. In 1979, he starred in a TV special, To Norway, Home of Giants, produced by Johnny Bergh.

Throughout the 1970s, Cleese also produced and acted in a number of successful business training films, including Meetings, Bloody Meetings, and More Bloody Meetings. These were produced by his company Video Arts.

Fawlty Towers

Cleese achieved greater prominence in the United Kingdom as the neurotic hotel manager Basil Fawlty in the two series of Fawlty Towers, first broadcast 1975 and 1979, which he co-wrote with his wife Connie Booth. The series won three BAFTA awards when produced, and in 2000 it topped the British Film Institute's list of the 100 Greatest British Television Programmes. In a 2001 poll conducted by Channel 4 Basil Fawlty was ranked second (behind Homer Simpson) on their list of the 100 Greatest TV Characters. The series also featured Prunella Scales as Basil's acerbic wife Sybil, Andrew Sachs as the much abused Spanish waiter Manuel, and Booth as waitress Polly, the series' voice of sanity. Cleese based Basil Fawlty on a real person, Donald Sinclair, whom he had encountered in 1970 while the Monty Python team were staying at the Gleneagles Hotel in Torquay while filming inserts for their television series. Reportedly, Cleese was inspired by Sinclair's mantra, "I could run this hotel just fine if it weren't for the guests." He later described Sinclair as "the most wonderfully rude man I have ever met", although Sinclair's widow has said her husband was totally misrepresented in the series. During the Pythons' stay, Sinclair allegedly threw Idle's briefcase out of the hotel "in case it contained a bomb", complained about Gilliam's "American" table manners, and threw a bus timetable at another guest after he dared to ask the time of the next bus to town.

The first series was screened from 19 September 1975 on BBC 2, initially to poor reviews, but gained momentum when repeated on BBC 1 the following year. Despite this, a second series did not air until 1979, by which time Cleese's marriage to Booth had ended, but they revived their collaboration for the second series. Fawlty Towers consisted of two seasons, each of only six episodes; Cleese and Booth both maintain that this was to avoid compromising the quality of the series. The popularity of Fawlty Towers has endured, and in addition to featuring high in greatest-ever television show polls it is often rebroadcast. In a 2002 poll, Basil's "don't mention the war" comment (said to the waitress Polly about the German guests) was ranked the second funniest line in television.

=== 1980–1999 ===
During the 1980s and 1990s, Cleese focused on film, though he did work with Peter Cook in his one-off TV special Peter Cook and Co. in 1980. In the same year, Cleese played Petruchio, in Shakespeare's The Taming of the Shrew in the BBC Television Shakespeare series. In 1981 he appeared in the Terry Gilliam-directed Time Bandits as Robin Hood. He also participated in Monty Python Live at the Hollywood Bowl (filmed 1980, released 1982) and starred in The Secret Policeman's Ball for Amnesty International. In 1985, Cleese had a small dramatic role as a sheriff in the American Western Silverado, which had an all-star cast that included Kevin Kline, with whom he starred in A Fish Called Wanda three years later. In 1986, he starred in the British comedy film Clockwise as an uptight school headmaster obsessed with punctuality and constantly getting into trouble during a journey to speak at the Headmasters' Conference. Written by Michael Frayn, the film was successful in the UK but not in the United States. It earned Cleese the 1987 Peter Sellers Award For Comedy at the Evening Standard British Film Awards.

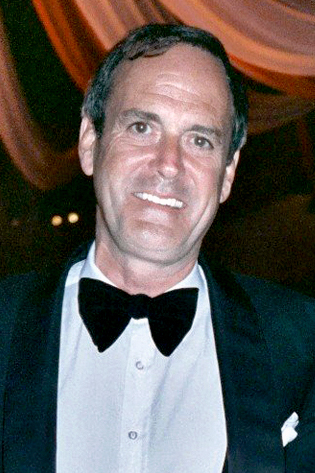
Cleese appearing at the 61st Academy Awards in March 1989

In 1988, Cleese wrote and starred in A Fish Called Wanda as the lead, Archie Leach, along with Jamie Lee Curtis, Kevin Kline, and Michael Palin. Wanda was a commercial and critical success, becoming one of the top ten films of the year at the US box office, and Cleese was nominated for an Academy Award for his script. Kline won the Oscar for his portrayal of bumbling, violent, narcissistic ex-CIA agent Otto West in the film.

From 1988 to 1992, Cleese appeared in numerous television commercials for Schweppes Ginger Ale. Between 1992 and 1994, he also appeared in some television commercials for Magnavox.

Fellow Python Graham Chapman died in 1989, a day before the 20th anniversary of the first broadcast of Flying Circus, with Jones commenting that it was "the worst case of party-pooping in all history." Cleese gave a eulogy at Chapman's memorial service.

Cleese later played a supporting role in Kenneth Branagh's adaptation of Mary Shelley's Frankenstein (1994) alongside Branagh himself and Robert De Niro. With Robin Skynner, the English psychiatrist, Cleese wrote two books on relationships: Families and How to Survive Them and Life and How to Survive It. The books are presented as a dialogue between Skynner and Cleese.

The follow-up to A Fish Called Wanda, Fierce Creatures—which again starred Cleese alongside Kevin Kline, Jamie Lee Curtis, and Michael Palin—was released in 1997, but was greeted with mixed reception by critics and audiences. Cleese has since often stated that making the second film had been a mistake. When asked by his friend, director and restaurant critic Michael Winner, what he would do differently if he could live his life again, Cleese responded, "I wouldn't have married Alyce Faye Eichelberger and I wouldn't have made Fierce Creatures."

In 1999, Cleese appeared in the James Bond film The World Is Not Enough as Q's assistant, referred to by Bond as "R". In 2002, when Cleese reprised his role in Die Another Day, the character was promoted, making Cleese the new quartermaster (Q) of MI6. In 2004, Cleese was featured as Q in the video game James Bond 007: Everything or Nothing, featuring his likeness and voice. Cleese did not appear in the subsequent Bond films, Casino Royale, Quantum of Solace and Skyfall; in the latter film, Ben Whishaw was cast in the role of Q.

=== 2000–2009 ===
Cleese is Provost's visiting professor at Cornell University, after having been Andrew D. White Professor-at-Large from 1999 to 2006. He makes occasional well-received appearances on the Cornell campus. In 2001, Cleese was cast in the comedy Rat Race as the eccentric hotel owner Donald P. Sinclair, the name of the Torquay hotel owner on whom he had based the character of Basil Fawlty. That year he appeared as Nearly Headless Nick in the first Harry Potter film: Harry Potter and the Philosopher's Stone (2001), a role he would reprise in Harry Potter and the Chamber of Secrets (2002). In 2002, Cleese made a cameo appearance in the film The Adventures of Pluto Nash, in which he played "James", a computerised chauffeur of a hover car stolen by Pluto Nash (played by Eddie Murphy). The vehicle is subsequently destroyed in a chase, leaving the chauffeur stranded in a remote place on the moon. In 2003, Cleese appeared as Lyle Finster on the American sitcom Will & Grace. His character's daughter, Lorraine, was played by Minnie Driver. In the series, Lyle Finster briefly marries Karen Walker (Megan Mullally). In 2004, Cleese was credited as co-writer of a DC Comics graphic novel titled Superman: True Brit. Part of DC's "Elseworlds" line of imaginary stories, True Brit, mostly written by Kim Howard Johnson, suggests what might have happened had Superman's rocket ship landed on a farm in Britain, not America.

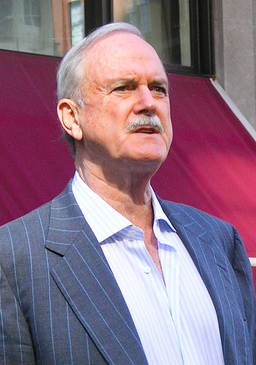
Cleese in 2008

From 10 November to 9 December 2005, Cleese toured New Zealand with his stage show John Cleese—His Life, Times and Current Medical Problems. Cleese described it as "a one-man show with several people in it, which pushes the envelope of acceptable behaviour in new and disgusting ways". The show was developed in New York City with William Goldman and includes Cleese's daughter Camilla as a writer and actor (the shows were directed by Australian Bille Brown). His assistant of many years, Garry Scott-Irvine, also appeared and was listed as a co-producer. The show then played in universities in California and Arizona from 10 January to 25 March 2006 under the title Seven Ways to Skin an Ocelot. His voice can be downloaded for directional guidance purposes as a downloadable option on some personal GPS-navigation device models by company TomTom.

In a 2005 poll of comedians and comedy insiders, The Comedians' Comedian, Cleese was voted second to Peter Cook. In 2006, Cleese hosted a television special of football's greatest kicks, goals, saves, bloopers, plays, and penalties, as well as football's influence on culture (including the Monty Python sketch "Philosophy Football"), featuring interviews with pop culture icons Dave Stewart, Dennis Hopper, and Henry Kissinger, as well as eminent footballers, including Pelé, Mia Hamm, and Thierry Henry. The Art of Soccer with John Cleese was released in North America on DVD in January 2009 by BFS Entertainment & Multimedia. Also in 2006, Cleese released the song "Don't Mention the World Cup".

Cleese lent his voice to the BioWare video game Jade Empire. His role was that of an "outlander" named Sir Roderick Ponce von Fontlebottom the Magnificent Bastard, stranded in the Imperial City of the Jade Empire. His character is essentially a British colonialist stereotype who refers to the people of the Jade Empire as "savages in need of enlightenment". His armour has the design of a fork stuck in a piece of cheese. In 2007, Cleese appeared in ads for Titleist as a golf course designer named "Ian MacCallister", who represents "Golf Designers Against Distance". Also in 2007, he was involved in filming of the sequel to The Pink Panther, titled The Pink Panther 2, with Steve Martin and Aishwarya Rai.

Cleese collaborated with Los Angeles Guitar Quartet member William Kanengiser in 2008 on the text to the performance piece "The Ingenious Gentleman of La Mancha". Cleese, as narrator, and the LAGQ premiered the work in Santa Barbara. The year 2008 also saw reports of Cleese working on a musical version of A Fish Called Wanda with his daughter Camilla.

At the end of March 2009, Cleese published his first article as "Contributing Editor" to The Spectator: "The real reason I had to join The Spectator". Cleese has also hosted comedy galas at the Montreal Just for Laughs comedy festival in 2006, and again in 2009. Towards the end of 2009 and into 2010, Cleese appeared in a series of television adverts for the Norwegian electric goods shop chain Elkjøp. In March 2010 it was announced that Cleese would be playing Jasper in the video game Fable III.

In 2009 and 2010, Cleese toured Scandinavia and the US with his Alimony Tour Year One and Year Two. In May 2010, it was announced that this tour, set for May 2011, would extend to the UK (his first tour there). The show is dubbed the "Alimony Tour" in reference to the financial implications of Cleese's divorce. The UK tour started in Cambridge on 3 May, visiting Birmingham, Nottingham, Salford, York, Liverpool, Leeds, Glasgow, Edinburgh, Oxford, Bristol and Bath (the Alimony Tour DVD was recorded on 2 July, the final Bath date). Later in 2011 John took his Alimony Tour to South Africa. He played Cape Town on the 21 & 22 October before moving over to Johannesburg, where he played from 25 to 30 October. In January 2012 he took his one-man show to Australia, starting in Perth on 22 January and throughout the next four months visited Adelaide, Brisbane, Gold Coast, Newcastle, New South Wales, Melbourne, Sydney, and finished up during April in Canberra.

=== 2010–present ===
In 2010, Cleese appeared in advertisements for The Automobile Association and for the Canadian insurance company Pacific Blue Cross.

In 2012, Cleese was cast in Hunting Elephants, a heist film comedy by Israeli filmmaker Reshef Levi. Cleese had to quit just prior to filming due to heart trouble and was replaced by Patrick Stewart. He also took a voice acting role in the 2012 video game Smart As..., where he played the narrator. Between September and October 2013, Cleese embarked on his first-ever cross-Canada comedy tour. Entitled "John Cleese: Last Time to See Me Before I Die tour", he visited Halifax, Ottawa, Toronto, Edmonton, Calgary, Victoria and finished in Vancouver, performing to mostly sold-out venues. Cleese returned to the stage in Dubai in November 2013, where he performed to a sold-out theatre.

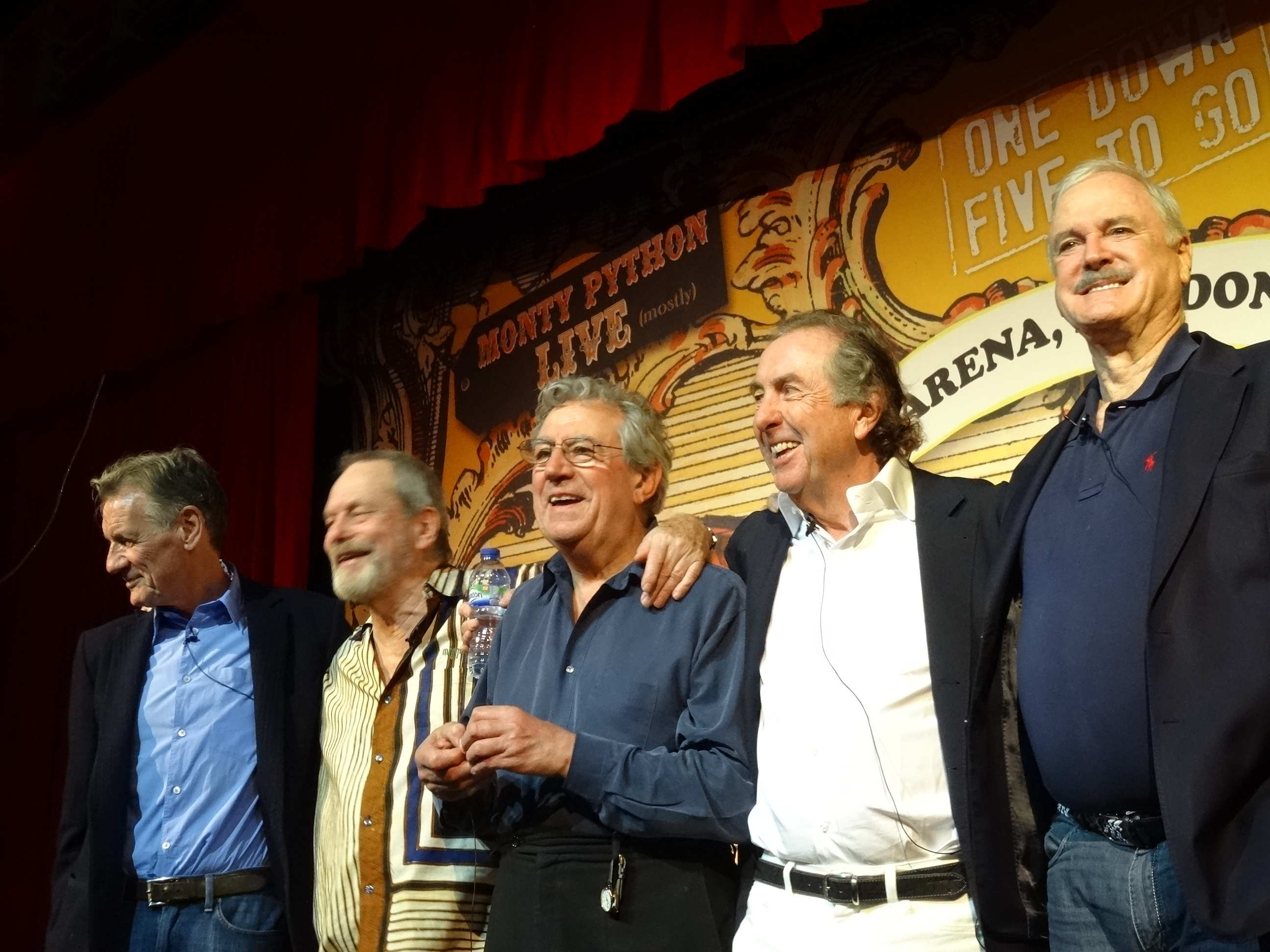
Cleese (right) with the rest of Monty Python on stage at the O_{2} Arena, London, in July 2014

Cleese was interviewed and appears as himself in filmmaker Gracie Otto's 2013 documentary film The Last Impresario, about Cleese's longtime friend and colleague Michael White. White produced Monty Python and the Holy Grail and Cleese's pre-Python comedy production Cambridge Circus. At a comic press conference in November 2013, Cleese and other surviving members of the Monty Python comedy group announced a reuniting performance to be held in July 2014.

Cleese joined with Eric Idle in 2015 and 2016 for a tour of North America, Canada and the ANZUS nations, "John Cleese & Eric Idle: Together Again At Last ... For The Very First Time", playing small theatres and including interaction with audiences as well as sketches and reminisces. In a Reddit interview, Cleese expressed regret that he had turned down the role played by Robin Williams in The Birdcage, the butler played by Anthony Hopkins in The Remains of the Day, and the bishop played by Peter Cook in The Princess Bride.

In 2017, Cleese wrote Bang Bang!, a new adaptation of Georges Feydeau's French play Monsieur Chasse!, for the Mercury Theatre, Colchester, before making its American premiere at the Shadowland Stages in Ellenville, New York, in 2018 followed by touring the UK in spring 2020.

In 2021, Cleese cancelled an appearance at the Cambridge Union Society after learning that art historian Andrew Graham-Dixon had been blacklisted by the union for impersonating Adolf Hitler. His visit to the university was intended to be part of a documentary on wokeism. Cleese said he was "blacklisting myself before someone else does".

In 2023, Cleese starred in Roman Polanski's black comedy film The Palace. In October, he starting presenting a new show on GB News, The Dinosaur Hour, which aired on Sunday evenings.

== Style of humour ==
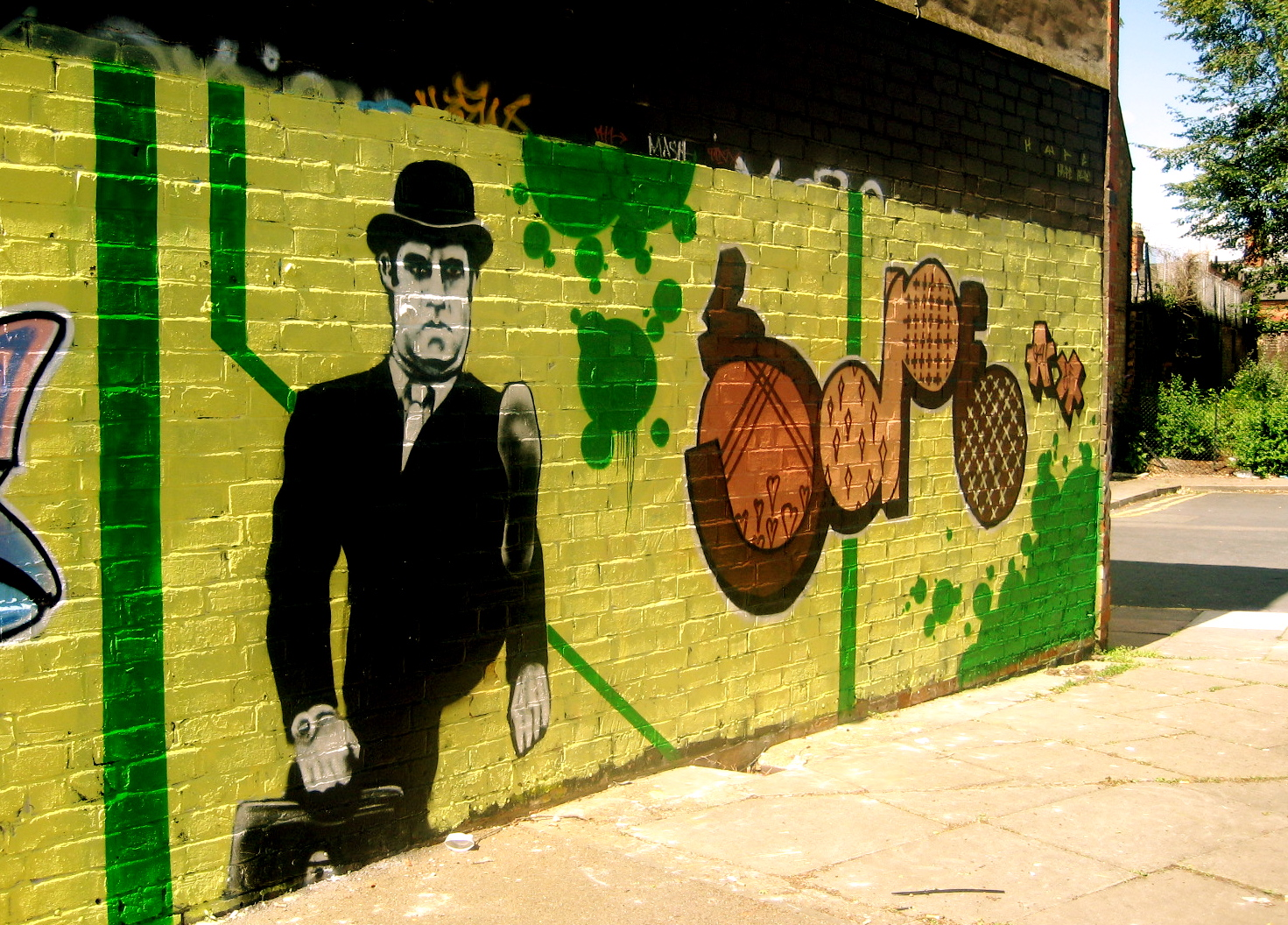
Graffiti of Cleese in "The Ministry of Silly Walks" sketch in Monty Python—Leicester, 2007

Cleese has specialised in political and religious satire, dark humour, sketch comedy, and surreal humour. In his Alimony Tour Cleese explained the origin of his fondness for dark humour, the only thing that he inherited from his mother. Examples of it are the "Dead Parrot sketch", "The Kipper and the Corpse" episode of Fawlty Towers, his clip for the 1992 BBC2 mockumentary "A Question of Taste", the Undertakers sketch, and his eulogy at Graham Chapman's memorial service which included the line, "Good riddance to him, the freeloading bastard! I hope he fries." On his attitude to life he states, "I can take almost nothing seriously".

Cleese has criticised political correctness, wokeism and cancel culture, saying that despite initial good intentions to "not be mean to people", they have become "a sort of indulgence of the most over-sensitive people in your culture, the people who are most easily upset [...] if you have to keep thinking which words you can use and which you can't, then that will stifle creativity." According to Cleese, "The main thing is to realise that words depend on their context [...] PC people simply don't understand this business about context because they tend to be very literal-minded", and that he imagined a "woke joke [...] might be heart-warming but it's not going to be very funny." He has also argued that political correctness and wokeism are a threat to humour, creativity, and freedom of thought and speech.

In 2020, following a controversy over the content of the Fawlty Towers episode "The Germans", Cleese criticised the BBC, saying "The BBC is now run by a mixture of marketing people and petty bureaucrats. It used to have a large sprinkling of people who'd actually made programmes. Not any more. So BBC decisions are made by persons whose main concern is not losing their jobs... That's why they're so cowardly and gutless and contemptible." He likened the style of humour in Fawlty Towers to the representation of Alf Garnett from another BBC sitcom, Till Death Us Do Part, saying "We laughed at Alf's reactionary views. Thus we discredited them, by laughing at him. Of course, there were people—very stupid people—who said 'Thank God someone is saying these things at last'. We laughed at these people too. Now they're taking decisions about BBC comedy."

== Activism and politics ==
Amnesty first started doing these fund-raising shows in 1976. The instigation came from John Cleese who wanted to help out. And he did it in the only way he knew how. Which was to put on a show with what he described as "a few friends". Who of course transpired to be his colleagues in Monty Python and other luminaries of British comedy.

— Martin Lewis, co-founder of The Secret Policeman's Ball, on Cleese instigating the benefit show.

Cleese (and the other members of Python) have contributed their services to charitable endeavours and causes—sometimes as an ensemble, at other times as individuals. The cause that has been the most frequent and consistent beneficiary has been the human rights work of Amnesty International via the Secret Policeman's Ball benefit shows. The idea of the Ball was conceived by Cleese, with Huffington Post stating "in 1976 he 'friended' the then-struggling Amnesty International (according to Martin Lewis, the very notion of Human Rights was then not the domain of hipsters and students, but just of foreign-policy wonks) first with a cheque signed 'J. Cleese' — and then by rounding up 'a few friends' to put on a show." Many musicians have publicly attributed their activism—and the organisation of their own benefit events—to the inspiration of the work in this field of Cleese and the rest of Python, such as Bob Geldof (one of the organisers of Live Aid), U2, Pete Townshend, and Sting. On the impact of the Ball on Geldof, Sting states, "he took the 'Ball' and ran with it."

Talking to Der Spiegel in 2015, Cleese expressed a critical view on what he saw as a plutocracy that was unhealthily developing control of the governance of the First World's societies, stating that he had reached a point when he "saw that our existence here is absolutely hopeless. I see the rich have got a stranglehold on us. If somebody had said that to me when I was 20, I would have regarded him as a left-wing loony."

Cleese is opposed to cancel culture. In 2020, he criticised the BBC's removal of the Fawlty Towers episode "The Germans" from the UKTV streaming service after protests following the murder of George Floyd, stating that the programme was mocking prejudice with its use of a character who uttered racial slurs. UKTV later restored the episode with a disclaimer about its content.

In 2025, Cleese shared antisemitic conspiracy theories on social media, for which he apologised, but cancelled all of his performances in Jerusalem and Tel Aviv. Cleese said he took the decision following safety advice. Alon Yurik Productions, the Israeli promoter, said that Cleese had "succumbed to threats" from the Boycott, Divestment and Sanctions (BDS) organisation.

In 2026, Cleese showed support for the 2025–2026 Iranian protests, and accused the BBC of bias towards the Iranian regime.

=== British politics ===
Cleese was a long-standing supporter of the Liberal Democrats and before that was a supporter of the original SDP after its formation in 1981. During the 1987 general election he recorded a party political broadcast for the SDP–Liberal Alliance and advocated proportional representation. Cleese subsequently appeared in broadcasts for the Liberal Democrats in the 1997 general election and narrated a radio election broadcast for the party during the 2001 general election. In 2022, he spoke at the conference of the revival Social Democratic Party.

Cleese declined a life peerage for political services in 1999. Paddy Ashdown, the outgoing leader of the Liberal Democrats, had put forward the suggestion shortly before stepping down, with the idea that Cleese would take the party whip and sit as a working peer, but the actor quipped that he "realised this involved being in England in the winter and I thought that was too much of a price to pay." Cleese had also declined a CBE title in 1996 as he thought they were "silly". In 2026, he ruled out any future acceptance of honours, stating that "I don't need that sort of validation. It's enough for me to know ... that I've helped [people] through difficult times by making them laugh".

In 2011, Cleese declared his appreciation for the coalition government between the Conservatives and Liberal Democrats. He described himself as "slightly left-of-centre" but criticised the previous Labour government, saying Gordon Brown "lacked emotional intelligence and was never a leader", and reiterated his support for proportional representation.

In 2014, Cleese expressed political interest in the UK Independence Party (UKIP), saying he was in doubt as to whether he was prepared to vote for it, but he was attracted to its challenge to the established political order and the radicalism of its policies on the UK's membership of the European Union (EU). He expressed support for immigration, but also concern about the integration of immigrants into British culture.

In 2016, Cleese publicly supported Brexit in the referendum on leaving the European Union. He tweeted: "If I thought there was any chance of major reform in the EU, I'd vote to stay in. But there isn't. Sad." Cleese said that "EU bureaucrats" had taken away "any trace of democratic accountability" and suggested they should "give up the euro, introduce accountability."

In July 2018, Cleese said that he was leaving the UK to relocate to the Caribbean island of Nevis, partly over frustration around the standard of the Brexit debate, including "dreadful lies" by "the right" and "scare tactics" by David Cameron and George Osborne, as well as a lack of reform regarding the press and the electoral system. He relocated to Nevis on 1 November 2018.

In May 2019, Cleese said that London was no longer an English city and that "virtually all my friends from abroad have confirmed my observation. So there must be some truth in it... I note also that London was the UK city that voted most strongly to remain in the EU". London Mayor Sadiq Khan remarked that Cleese "sound[s] like he's in character as Basil Fawlty. Londoners know that our diversity is our greatest strength. We are proudly the English capital, a European city and a global hub". In response, Cleese said he believed that the "calmer, more polite, more humorous, less tabloid, and less money-oriented" Englishness of his upbringing was being replaced. He was accused of xenophobia by Caspar Salmon of The Independent, and Dalia Gebrial wrote for The Washington Post that Cleese's worldview relied "on an approach to citizenship and national-belonging that is both ahistorical and racist" and that "London has never been a purely 'English' city in the way Cleese means."

Writing on X in 2026, Cleese described Khan as a "silly little man" and stated that "traditional British values are under attack from Muslim belief systems", but denied allegations that he was Islamophobic, stating that the term is "emotionally loaded" in order to suggest that criticism of Islam is irrational; he clarified that he considers himself an "Islamosceptic". He answered "no" to a post asking whether Islam may be considered a part of modern British identity, and stated that some immigrant cultures "have no respect for British traditions and intend to completely replace them".

In February 2026, The Guardian reported that Cleese had "given approving signals" for Rupert Lowe's new party, Restore Britain. In July, he said he trusted Lowe more than any other party leader. He also published posts opposing mass immigration, supporting Piddington's independence referendum in response to the housing of asylum seekers in the village, and shared AI-generated videos depicting migrants negatively; The New World suggested that Cleese did not appear to be aware that the videos were not real.

=== American politics ===
In 2008, Cleese expressed support for Barack Obama and his presidential candidacy, offering his services as a speech writer. He was an outspoken critic of Republican Vice-Presidential candidate Sarah Palin, saying that "Michael Palin is no longer the funniest Palin". The same year, he wrote a satirical poem about Fox News commentator Sean Hannity for Countdown with Keith Olbermann.

During Republican nominee Donald Trump's 2016 campaign for the US presidency, Cleese described him as "a narcissist, with no attention span, who doesn't have clear ideas about anything and makes it all up as he goes along". He had previously described the leadership of the Republican Party as "the most cynical, most disgracefully immoral people I've ever come across in a Western civilisation".

=== Anti-smoking campaign ===
In 1992, the Health Education Authority recruited Cleese—an ex-smoker—to star in a series of anti-smoking public service announcements (PSAs) on British television, which took the form of sketches rife with morbid humour about smoking and were designed to encourage adult smokers to quit. In a controlled study of regions of central and northern England (one region received no intervention) the PSAs were broadcast in two regions, and one region received both the PSAs, plus locally organised anti-tobacco campaigning. The study found:

After 18 months, 9.8% of successfully re-interviewed smokers had stopped and 4.3% of ex-smokers had relapsed. [...] There was no evidence of an extra effect of the local tobacco control network when combined with TV media [...] Applying these results to a typical population where 28% smoke and 28% are ex-smokers, and where there would be an equal number of quitters and relapsers over an 18 month period without the campaign, suggests that the campaign would reduce smoking prevalence by about 1.2%.

== Personal life ==
Cleese met the American actress and writer Connie Booth in the US and they married in 1968. In 1971, Booth gave birth to their only child, Cynthia Cleese, who went on to appear with her father in his films A Fish Called Wanda and Fierce Creatures. With Booth, Cleese wrote the scripts for and co-starred in both series of Fawlty Towers, although the two were actually divorced before the second series was finished and aired. Cleese and Booth are said to have remained close friends since. Cleese has two grandchildren through Cynthia's marriage to American filmmaker Ed Solomon. Cleese married American actress Barbara Trentham in 1981. Their daughter Camilla, Cleese's second child, was born in 1984. He and Trentham divorced in 1990. During this time, Cleese emigrated to Los Angeles.

In 1992, Cleese married American psychotherapist, author, and talk radio host Alyce Faye Eichelberger. They divorced in 2008; the divorce settlement left Eichelberger with £12 million in finance and assets, including £600,000 a year for seven years. Cleese said, "What I find so unfair is that if we both died today, her children would get much more than mine ... I got off lightly. Think what I'd have had to pay Alyce if she had contributed anything to the relationship—such as children, or a conversation".

Less than a year later, Cleese returned to the UK, where he has property in London and a home on the Royal Crescent in Bath, Somerset. In August 2012, Cleese married English jewelry designer and former model Jennifer Wade in a ceremony on the Caribbean island of Mustique.

In an interview in 2014, Cleese blamed his mother, who lived to the age of 101, for his problems in relationships with women, saying: "My ingrained habit of walking on eggshells when dealing with my mother dominated my romantic liaisons for many years." Cleese said that he had spent "a large part of my life in some form of therapy" over his relationships with women. He has received treatment for depression.

In March 2015, in an interview with Der Spiegel, he was asked if he was religious. Cleese stated that he did not think much of organised religion and said he was not committed to "anything except the vague feeling that there is something more going on than the materialist reductionist people think".

Cleese has a passion for lemurs. Following the 1997 comedy film Fierce Creatures, in which a ring-tailed lemur played a key role, he hosted the 1998 BBC documentary In the Wild: Operation Lemur with John Cleese, which tracked the progress of a reintroduction of black-and-white ruffed lemurs back into the Betampona Reserve in Madagascar. The project had been partly funded by Cleese's donation of the proceeds from the London premiere of Fierce Creatures. Cleese said: "I adore lemurs. They're extremely gentle, well-mannered, pretty and yet great fun."

The Bemaraha woolly lemur (Avahi cleesei), also known as Cleese's woolly lemur, is native to western Madagascar. The scientist who discovered the species named it after Cleese, mainly because of Cleese's fondness for lemurs and his efforts at protecting and preserving them. The species was first discovered in 1990 by a team of scientists from the University of Zurich led by Urs Thalmann but was not formally described as a species until 11 November 2005.

== Awards and nominations ==
Year	Association	Category	Nominated work	Result
1988	Academy Award	Original Screenplay	A Fish Called Wanda	Nominated
1988	Golden Globe Award	Best Actor in a Motion Picture – Comedy of Musical	A Fish Called Wanda	Nominated
1988	BAFTA Film Award	Best Actor in a Leading Role	A Fish Called Wanda	Won
1988	BAFTA Film Award	Best Original Screenplay	A Fish Called Wanda	Nominated
1970	BAFTA Television Award	Best Light Entertainment Performance	Monty Python's Flying Circus	Nominated
1971	BAFTA Television Award	Best Light Entertainment Performance	Monty Python's Flying Circus	Nominated
1973	BAFTA Television Award	Best Light Entertainment Performance	Monty Python's Flying Circus	Nominated
1976	BAFTA Television Award	Best Light Entertainment Performance	Fawlty Towers	Nominated
1980	BAFTA Television Award	Best Light Entertainment Performance	Fawlty Towers	Won
1987	Emmy Awards	Outstanding Guest Actor in a Comedy Series	Cheers	Won
1998	Emmy Awards	Outstanding Guest Actor in a Comedy Series	3rd Rock from the Sun	Nominated
2002	Emmy Awards	Outstanding Non-Fiction Special	The Human Face	Nominated
2004	Emmy Awards	Outstanding Guest Actor in a Comedy Series	Will & Grace	Nominated
1976	Grammy Awards	Best Comedy Album	The Monty Python Matching Tie and Handkerchief	Nominated
1981	Grammy Awards	Best Comedy Album	Monty Python's Contractual Obligation Album	Nominated
1984	Grammy Awards	Best Comedy Album	Monty Python's The Meaning of Life	Nominated
1989	Grammy Awards	Best Spoken Word Album	The Screwtape Letters	Nominated
1994	Grammy Awards	Best Spoken Word Album for Children	Did I Ever Tell You How Lucky You Are?	Nominated

== Honours and tributes ==
- A species of lemur, the Bemaraha woolly lemur (Avahi cleesei), has been named in his honour. Cleese has mentioned this in television interviews. Also, there is a mention of this honour in New Scientist magazine—and Cleese's response to it.
- An asteroid, 9618 Johncleese, is named in his honour.
- A municipal rubbish heap 45 metres (148 ft) high that has been named Mt Cleese at the Awapuni landfill just outside Palmerston North after he dubbed the city "suicide capital of New Zealand" after a stay there in 2005.

=== Scholastic ===
University degrees

Location	Date	School	Degree
England	1963	Downing College, Cambridge	Law

Chancellor, visitor, governor, rector, and fellowships

Location	Date	School	Position
Scotland	1970–1973	University of St Andrews	Rector

Honorary degrees

Location	Date	School	Degree
Scotland	1971	University of St Andrews	Doctorate
California, United States	1999	Pomona College	Doctor of Letters (D.Litt.)
England	28 June 2016	University of Bath	Doctor of Clinical Psychology
England	17 September 2016	Open University	Doctor of the University (D. Univ)

== Published works ==
- The Rectorial Address of John Cleese, Epam, 1971, 8 pages
- The Human Face (with Brian Bates) (DK Publishing Inc., 2001, ISBN 978-0-7894-7836-8)
- Foreword for Time and the Soul, Jacob Needleman, 2003, ISBN 1-57675-251-8 (paperback)
- Superman: True Brit, DC Comics, 2004, ISBN 9781845760120
- So, Anyway... Crown Archetype. 2014. ISBN 978-0-385-34824-9. Memoir.
- Professor at Large: The Cornell Years. Cornell University Press. 2018. ISBN 978-1-5017-1657-7.
- Creativity: A Short and Cheerful Guide, 2020, Crown, ISBN 978-0385348270
- The Golden Skits of Wing-commander Muriel Volestrangler, F.R.H.S. and Bar. Methuen. 1984. ISBN 978-0413415608.

=== Dialogues ===
- Families and How to Survive Them, w/Robin Skynner, 1983. ISBN 0-413-52640-2 (hardcover), ISBN 0-19-520466-2 (paperback)
- Life and How to Survive It, w/Robin Skynner, 1993. ISBN 0-413-66030-3 (hardcover), ISBN 0-393-31472-3 (paperback)

== See also ==
- List of people who have declined a British honour

Preceded by Desmond Llewelyn	Q (James Bond films); 2001–2002	Succeeded by Ben Whishaw (2012)

Academic offices
Preceded by Learie Nicholas Constantine, Baron Constantine, Kt.	Rector of the University of St Andrews; 1970–1973	Succeeded by Alan Coren
