= Alyce Cleese =

American psychotherapist

- Born: Alyce Faye McBride; October 28, 1944 (age 81); Frederick, Oklahoma, U.S.
- Occupations: Psychotherapist; author; talk radio host
- Years active: 1966–present
- Spouses: Dave Eichelberger (m. 1966; div. 1975) John Cleese (m. 1992; div. 2008)

Alyce Faye Eichelberger Cleese (née McBride; born October 28, 1944) is an American psychotherapist, author, and talk radio host. She was married to golfer Dave Eichelberger and later to actor-comedian John Cleese.

== Education ==
McBride received her bachelor's degree from Oklahoma State University in 1966. While at Oklahoma State, she served as "queen" of Willard Hall before it was transformed from a women's dormitory into its current role as the site of the university's college of education. She continued her studies at Baylor University, earning master's degrees in educational psychology and in vocational and educational counseling. She then moved to London, where she studied the psychoanalysis of children under Anna Freud, working with disturbed children from disadvantaged backgrounds at The Hampstead Clinic (established by Freud in 1952), and receiving a postgraduate qualification, the Diploma in the Maladjusted Child, from the University of London Institute of Education.

== Career ==
Eichelberger worked as a psychotherapist for more than three decades. She is the co-author (with Brian Bates) of How to Manage Your Mother: Understanding the Most Difficult, Complicated, and Fascinating Relationship in Your Life and she sits on the board of trustees of the Esalen Institute. She is on the American board of the National Theatre for London and the board of the Shakespeare Society for New York. She is a visiting senior tutor at Massachusetts General Hospital.

== Honors ==
She was honored by Harvard University for her work in psychotherapy, and was inducted into the Oklahoma State University College of Education hall of fame in 2007.

== Marriage to John Cleese and divorce ==
After divorcing Dave Eichelberger (with whom she had two sons), she met actor John Cleese in 1990 and they married in 1992. They divorced in 2008, though details of the $20 million divorce settlement only became public knowledge in August 2009. She was represented by Fiona Shackleton.
