= Knut Aunbu =

Norwegian television producer

- Born: September 4, 1943; Oslo, Norway
- Died: August 16, 2016 (aged 72); Oslo, Norway
- Occupation: Television producer

Knut Per Aunbu (September 4, 1943 – August 16, 2016) was a Norwegian writer, film scriptwriter, and producer at NRK.

Aubnu was born in Oslo. He started his career at NRK in 1967 and remained there until his retirement in 2011. In the course of his 44-year career with NRK, he wrote and produced a series of television broadcasts and programs, including the films HurRah (1971), Toget (1977), and To Norway, Home of Giants (1979), as well as the mini-series Major von Knarren (1971). He was also the host of the entertainment program Show-Show in 1974, and he served as the commentator for the Eurovision Song Contest for NRK in 1980 and 1981.

Aunbu began his NRK career as technical manager and then worked his way up. Among other things, he worked as a recording manager, presenter, production and transmission manager, and editorial manager. He also became the channel manager for NRK1 in 2000, and he served as a program editor at NRK until he retired.

He died in August 2016.
