= To Norway, Home of Giants =

- Based on: an idea by Marit and Knut Aunbu
- Written by: Knut Aunbu; Johnny Bergh; Bjørn Sand; Erik Søby
- Directed by: Johnny Bergh; Bjørn Sand
- Starring: John Cleese
- Country of origin: Norway
- Original language: English

Production
- Producer: Tordis Mørkved Aavatsmark
- Cinematography: Erik Hauan
- Editor: Kjell Andersen
- Running time: 27 minutes

Original release
- Network: Norsk rikskringkasting
- Release: 1979

To Norway, Home of Giants (Norwegian: For Norge, Kiæmpers Fødeland) was the Norwegian contribution to the 1979 Rose d'Or in Montreux, where it won two prizes. The short comedy film was directed by Johnny Bergh and Bjørn Sand. The script was written by Knut Aunbu, Johnny Bergh, Bjørn Sand, and Erik Søby.

The film was a mock report from Norway, presented by the English reporter Norman Fearless (John Cleese). The film premiered on May 5, 1979.

== Cast ==
- John Cleese
- Øivind Blunck
- Ingeborg Cook
- Jon Eikemo
- Per Jansen
- Jorunn Kjellsby
- Aud Schønemann
- Sverre Wilberg
