= Life and How to Survive It =

Book by Robin Skynner and John Cleese

- Author: Robin Skynner, John Cleese
- Language: English
- Publisher: Random House
- Publication date: 2011
- ISBN: 978-1446490716

Life and How To Survive It is a self-help psychology book written by the therapist Robin Skynner and the comedian John Cleese. The book is written in a question and answer form, with Cleese asking questions about relationships, and his therapist Skynner answering them. It is the sequel to Families and How to Survive Them.

The book aims to answer questions both psychologically and sociologically about why the world is the way it is and how this affects individuals. The narrative takes the reader on a journey into hidden consciousness and tries to explain why and how relationships do or do not work. Concepts such as the three parts of the human psyche (Id, ego and super-ego) are explored.

At one stage in the book, Skynner describes his experiences with LSD as part of a research project and the effect that they had on his subsequent consciousness, particularly in terms of understanding a spiritual dimension of life and the interconnectedness of all phenomena within it - a sense that echoes much of the descriptions of mystical experiences collated in William James's Varieties of Religious Experience.
