= Johnny Bergh =

Norwegian television producer (1934–2014)

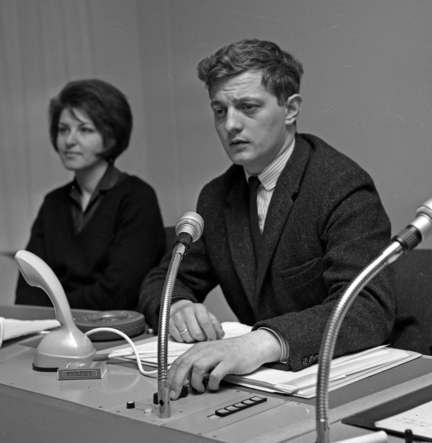
- Bergh in the control room for a TV broadcast in the 1960s, from the Centralteatret in Oslo, Norway.
- Born: Johnny Odd Berg; May 6, 1934; Austrheim Municipality, Norway
- Died: December 23, 2014 (aged 80); Bærum Municipality, Norway
- Occupation(s): TV producer, director, scriptwriter, TV host, actor
- Spouse: Bitte Monn-Iversen (1982—2014)

Johnny Odd Bergh (May 6, 1934 – December 23, 2014) was a Norwegian producer, scriptwriter and director. He was a key player in the development of Norwegian television, and one of the most influential people in Norwegian entertainment until the mid 90s.

== Biography ==
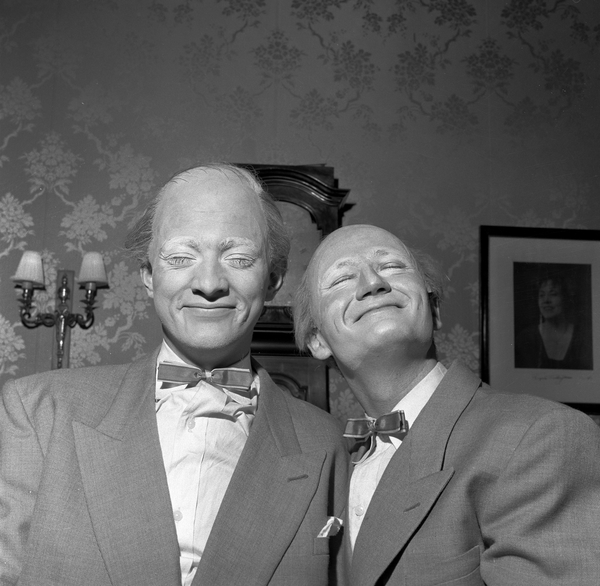
Actors Johnny Bergh and Tom Tellefsen while performing at The National Theatre in Oslo in 1958.

Bergh started his career as a jazz musician and comedy actor in Bergen, and studied acting at the Norwegian National Academy of Theatre. In 1958 he was recruited to the Norwegian Broadcasting Corporation - two years before regular television broadcasts started in Norway - as employee number 12. After just a few years he became a prominent director and producer. As one of the first TV workers in Norway, Bergh worked for the first years with everything from the Nobel Peace Prize and the news to theatre and large studio shows. It was however entertainment that would become his speciality.

During his career he produced several thousand TV programs. The shows went on to become benchmark productions for Norwegian entertainment, and many want on for many seasons, some still being in production. Programs include: Lørdagskveld med Erik Bye (talkshow), Kontrapunkt (quiz show), Momarkedet (live variety show), Kvitt eller dobbelt (Norwegian version of The $64,000 Question), Ta sjansen (annual event), Dette er ditt liv (Norwegian version of This Is Your Life), Nyttårsshow (variety show), OL-show (Olympic variety show), Spellemannprisen (Norwegian music awards) and Melodi Grand Prix (Eurovision Song Contest).

He was the responsible national producer for the Nordic collaborative Nordvision broadcasts in the early days of Norwegian television. Bergh also directed concerts with international artists such as Ella Fitzgerald, Duke Ellington, Bill Evans, Jim Reeves and Otis Redding. From 1986 til 1990, Bergh was the editorial director at the NRK's entertainment department.

Bergh had a close professional and personal relationship with TV hosts like Erik Bye, Knut Bjørnsen, Erik Diesen and Harald Tusberg, and produced and developed several shows with all of them. He gave Norwegian entertainment personalities like Harald Heide-Steen jr., Roald Øyen and Stein Roger Bull their first jobs in television and launched Dan Børge Akerø as an entertainment name. He also got to work with international artists like Julie Andrews, Bing Crosby, Johnny Weissmuller, Josephine Baker, Ken Curtis, Danny Kaye, The Delta Rhythm Boys, Marty Feldman, Donna Summer, Tina Turner, ABBA and Cliff Richards.

Bergh won six times in Rose D'Or in Montreux with different comedy shows. Among these prize winning productions are To Norway, Home of Giants, starring John Cleese, which won two awards. Productions by Johnny Bergh got over 30% of the places when the Norwegian paper Dagbladet awarded the best Norwegian TV entertainment ever in 2010.

Bergh has had a strong influence as a role model, mentor and creator of TV as a visual medium. He was the first in Norway who could tell a story with living images on TV. Through his work he created a school for producing that made the foundation of the professional level of production in Norway today.

== Personal life ==
Bergh was married to the TV producer Bitte Monn-Iversen, daughter of composer and producer Egil Monn-Iversen and singer, comedian and actor Sølvi Wang, and died on December 23, 2014, at the age of 80.
