= Families and How to Survive Them =

Book by John Cleese and Robin Skynner

Families and How To Survive Them
- Author: John Cleese and Robin Skynner
- Language: English
- Media type: Print (Hardback & Paperback)

Families and How to Survive Them is a bestselling self-help book co-authored by the psychiatrist and psychotherapist Robin Skynner and the comedian John Cleese. It was first published in 1983, and is illustrated throughout by the cartoonist J. B. Handelsman. The book takes the form of a series of dialogues between Skynner, playing the role of therapist, and Cleese, who adopts the role of inquisitive lay person.

The book was also serialised as a six-part radio series for the UK BBC station BBC Radio 4, with each episode being 30 minutes long. This was also in the form of a convivial conversation between Cleese and Skynner and following the same structure as the book, albeit in an abridged form. It was subsequently released on Compact Cassette and Compact Disc in a slightly modified form.

Its sequel is Life and How to Survive It.

== Synopsis ==
The book is a description and analysis of how and why we fall in love, how we develop from babies to adolescents to adults, and how during this development we so often become "stuck" in childlike behaviour, and how all these things are influenced by previous generations in our families. The authors themselves have said that the aim of the book was "to make intelligible and accessible the psychological aspects of how families behave and function, what makes some work and others fail, and how families can move up the scale towards greater health and happiness".

The motivation behind it was to "make available to the general public, in a way that was easy to absorb, those aspects of psychological knowledge we had found most helpful ourselves towards making life more understandable, meaningful, and enjoyable".

Families and How to Survive Them may be said to have arisen from two sources – an earlier book, One Flesh, Separate Persons: Principles of Family and Marital Therapy (1976) by Skynner, and work carried out by Skynner at the Institute of Family Therapy in London in the 1970s. Cleese, who attended a lengthy course of group therapy at the institute in the mid seventies, was so impressed by what he experienced that, motivated by a desire to spread what lay behind the therapy to a wider audience, proposed to Skynner that they write a book summarising and outlining the principles involved.

== Chapters ==
- Chapter 1: Why Did I Have to Marry You?
- Chapter 2: I'm God, and Let's Leave it Like That – In the extensive further reading section at the end of the book, Skynner acknowledges that this chapter "depends heavily on the ideas of Melanie Klein, founder of The English School of Psychoanalysis".
- Chapter 3: The Astonishing Stuffed Rabbit
- Chapter 4: Who's in Charge Here?
- Chapter 5: What are You Two Doing in There?
