= Oklahoma State University College of Education =

Coordinates: 36.1215°N 97.0710°W

The Oklahoma State University College of Education (COE) serves more than 3000 students within 29 graduate and undergraduate programs at Oklahoma State University in Stillwater, Oklahoma as well as Tulsa, Oklahoma. The College of Education consists of three schools with diverse students.

== School of Applied Health and Educational Psychology ==
The School of Applied Health and Educational Psychology (SAHEP) cultivates the development, integration and application of knowledge, theory, skills and experiences to promote social, physical, psychological, educational, and environmental health. SAHEP is composed of eight program areas:

- Athletic Training
- Counseling Psychology
- Counseling (Community & School)
- Educational Psychology
- Health Promotion
- Leisure Studies (LSM & TR)
- Physical Education
- School Psychology

== School of Teaching and Curriculum Leadership ==
=== STCL Undergraduate Programs ===
- Elementary Education
- K-12 Education (art, foreign language)
- Occupational Education Studies
- Reading Education
- Secondary Education
- Special Education

=== STCL Masters of Science Programs ===
- Curriculum Studies
- Elementary, Middle, Secondary, & K12 Education
- Occupational Education Studies
- Reading/Literacy
- Library Media Specialist
- Special Education

=== STCL Doctor of Philosophy (Ph.D.) in Education ===
- Curriculum Studies
- Occupational Education Studies
- Professional Education Studies
- Social Foundations of Education

== School of Educational Foundations, Leadership and Aviation ==
The School of Educational Foundations, Leadership and Aviation offers Advanced Degree in Aviation, Educational Leadership, Research Evaluation and Social Foundations. The Aviation program also offers bachelor's degrees in Professional Pilot and Aviation Management.

- Aviation and Space Education
- Educational Leader
- Research, Evaluation, Measurements & Statistics
- Social Foundations
- Educational Technology
