= Robin Skynner =

British psychiatrist

Robin Skynner (16 August 1922 in Cornwall–24 September 2000 in Islington, London) was a psychiatric pioneer and innovator in treating mental illness.

As a young man during World War II, Skynner was a Royal Air Force (RAF) pilot who flew the Mosquito twin-engined fighter bomber, and the destruction he had to take part in drew him to psychiatry. Trained in group analysis and working as child psychiatrist and family therapist, he employed group-analytic principles in that therapeutic modality. He was a teacher and practitioner of psychotherapy with individuals, groups, families, couples, and institutions, as well as a prolific writer.

== Early life ==
Born on 16 August 1922 at Charlestown, St Austell, Cornwall, Skynner was the eldest of five boys. He was educated at St Austell County School and at Blundell's School, after which, at 18, he volunteered for the Royal Air Force, and was selected as a prospective bomber pilot. The destruction and slaughter he had to participate in adversely affected him, an experience that, for a variety of complex reasons, drew him to psychiatry as an eventual vocation.

== Career ==
After demobilisation from RAF service, Skynner enrolled as a student at University College Hospital and qualified MB, BS (Lond) in 1952. He then began his psychiatric training. In 1957, he passed the Diploma of Psychological Medicine. In 1971, he was elected MRCPsych, proceeding FRCPsych in 1976. He was successively the Director of the Woodberry Down Child Guidance Unit, Physician-in Charge of the Queen Elizabeth Hospital for Children, Senior Tutor in Psychotherapy at the Institute of Psychiatry and Honorary Associate Consultant at the Maudsley Hospital.

Dr S.H. Foulkes, a psychoanalyst and psychiatrist, was one of the founders of group analysis in Britain, a group approach developed out of Foulkes' treatment of war victims in Northfield Hospital, Birmingham. Foulkes was a pioneer and quickly attracted the attention of others keen to change the way mental health patients were dealt with. Skynner was intrigued by Foulkes and by the early stages of the therapeutic community movement, which was gathering strength. He became Foulkes' pupil and later his patient in a group. Robin Skynner would readily admit he needed treatment himself.

In 1959, together with fellow disciples of Dr. Foulkes, Skynner founded the Group Analytic Practice, which specialises in group, family and marital therapy. A logical development was the emergence of the Institute of Group Analysis for the specific purpose of giving training in group therapy. However, it was Skynner himself who, in 1977, founded the Institute of Family Therapy and chaired it for the next two years.

Skynner subsequently worked with adults and children of an unusually wide range of socio-economic status, from the poorest districts of the East End of London to private practice. His chief interest was the practice and teaching of psychotherapy, with individuals, groups, families, couples and institutions. The important posts he successfully filled were senior tutor (psychotherapy) at the Institute of Psychiatry, honorary assistant consultant psychiatrist at Bethlem Royal and Maudsley Hospital and physician in charge of the Department of Psychiatry at Queen Elizabeth Hospital for Children, London.

== Family life ==
Skynner married twice: from 1948 to 1959 to Geraldine Foley; then, in 1959, he married Prudence Fawcett, who died in 1987.

== Death ==
He is buried alongside Prudence in Highgate Cemetery London. He is survived by a son, a daughter and four grandchildren.

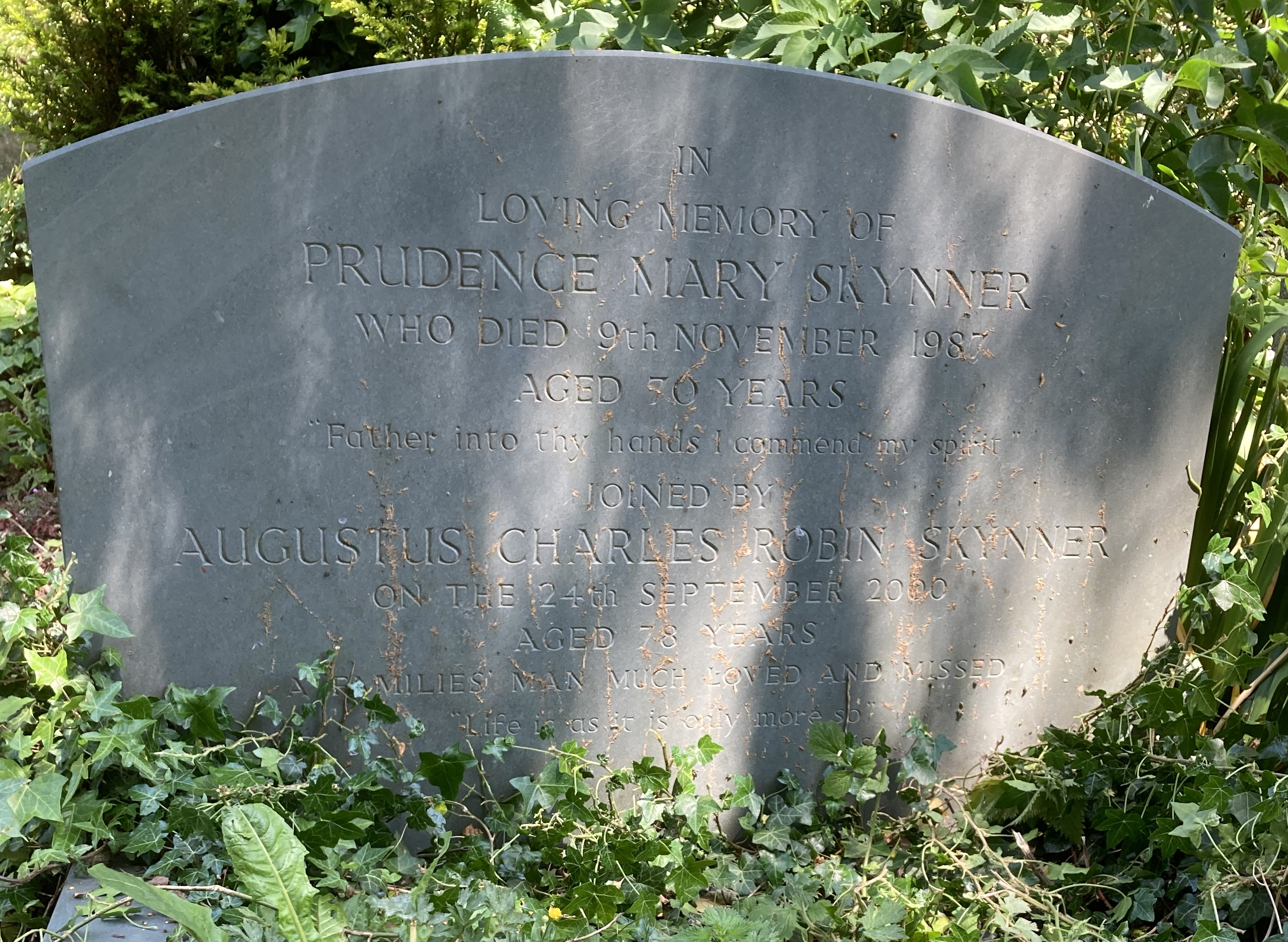
Grave of Robin Skynner in Highgate Cemetery

== Therapeutic techniques ==
Skynner emphasised three main principles in family therapy:

1. The importance of facilitating communication within the family.
2. The need for a clear authority structure or familial hierarchy.
3. The centrality of individual developmental life-stages in the family problems.

Using transference and countertransference as therapeutic tools, he worked to change family power structures so as to increase order and clarity, and encouraged the taking back of psychological projections to avoid the scapegoating and delinquency of the projections' carrier.

== Works ==
=== Books ===
- One Flesh: Separate Persons, Principles of Family and Marital Psychotherapy (1976)
- Explorations with Families: Group-Analysis and Family Therapy (1987)
- Institutes and How to Survive Them: Mental Health Training and Consultation (1989)
- Family Matters (1995)
- Families and How to Survive Them (1983)
- Life and How to Survive It (1993)

=== Articles ===
- Skynner, A. C. (1984). Group analysis and family therapy. International Journal of Group Psychotherapy; 34: 215-224.

== See also ==
- Salvador Minuchin
