= Video Arts =

UK producer of soft-skills training programmes

Video Arts Ltd
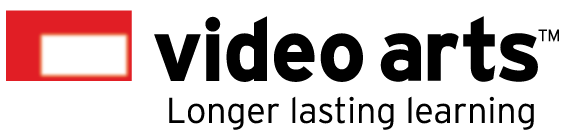
- Type: Subsidiary
- Industry: Video production eLearning
- Genre: Comedy; Learning; Soft Skills; Training
- Founded: 1972; 54 years ago
- Founder: John Cleese; Sir Antony Jay
- Headquarters: London, United Kingdom
- Parent: Tinopolis (2007–present)
- Website: videoarts.com

Video Arts Ltd is a British video production company which produces and sells soft-skills training programmes, e-learning courses and learning platforms. Video Arts also distributes third-party titles.

== Overview ==
The company was founded in 1972 by John Cleese, Sir Antony Jay and a group of other television professionals.

Video Arts uses humour to make learning points more memorable. Its slogan is a quote from John Cleese: “People learn nothing when they’re asleep, and very little when they’re bored".

Video Arts' productions include;

- Meetings, Bloody Meetings (John Cleese, Will Smith)
- Can You Spare a Moment (John Cleese, Ricky Gervais)
- The Balance Sheet Barrier (John Cleese, Ronnie Corbett, later version with Dawn French)
- Jamie's School Dinners: Managing Change (Jamie Oliver)
- Pass It On (Rob Brydon, Will Smith)
- The Ultimate Stress Show (Olivia Colman)
- Performance Review: Every Appraisee's Dream (Hugh Laurie)
- The Art of Selling (Sheridan Smith)
- Behavioural Interviewing (James Nesbitt, Rebecca Front, Kris Marshall)
- Assert Yourself (Kris Marshall, Mark Heap)
- Mr. Kershaw's Dream System (Rowan Atkinson)
- Performance Review: Code Red (Sharon Horgan, Jim Howick, David Schaal),
- Successful Selling (Kevin Bishop, James Lance, Simon Greenall)
- Sell It To Me (Robert Lindsay)
- 30 Ways to Make More Time (James Nesbitt)
- Presentation is Everything (Mathew Horne)
- The Unorganized Manager (John Cleese, James Bolam)

As well as corporate training videos, the company produced the comedy series Fairly Secret Army for Channel 4.
