= Massacre (franchise) =

- Banner utilized on releases of films
- Distributed by: New Concorde; Syfy
- Running time: 392 minutes
- Country: United States
- Language: English

The Massacre films are three interconnected series of slasher films executive-produced by Roger Corman: the Slumber Party Massacre series (1982–1990), the Sorority House Massacre series (1986–1990) and the Cheerleader Massacre series (2003–2011), distributed by New World Pictures and New Concorde. The series also features the standalone film Sharkansas Women's Prison Massacre (2015), and the reboot film Slumber Party Massacre (2021).

All three of the original Slumber Party Massacre films, and the first Sorority House Massacre film, were given limited theatrical releases, while Sorority House Massacre II and III, and both Cheerleader Massacre films were released direct-to-video, and the 2021 reboot released to the Syfy network. The franchise is notable for being primarily directed by women, who direct every Slumber Party Massacre film and the first Sorority House Massacre film.

== Background ==
The title Massacre Collection was utilized in the marketing of the DVD releases of the films, and was not a part of their theatrical or initial home video releases. The films, the first six of which were each produced by Roger Corman, were marketed as an analogous series based on their related content as well as the inclusion of "massacre" in their respective titles.

The Slumber Party Massacre series has the distinction of being the first horror film series in history whose films were exclusively written and directed by women, in addition to the first spin-off film forming the Sorority House Massacre sub-series.

== Film series ==
=== Slumber Party Massacre series ===
Year	Title	Director	Massacre Collection release	
Year	Title	Director	Date	Format
1982	The Slumber Party Massacre	Amy Holden Jones	September 17, 2002; July 22, 2003	Standalone DVD; Double feature DVD
1987	Slumber Party Massacre II	Deborah Brock	September 17, 2002; July 22, 2003	Standalone DVD; Double feature DVD
1990	Slumber Party Massacre III	Sally Mattison	September 17, 2002	Standalone DVD
2021	Slumber Party Massacre	Danishka Esterhazy	October 16, 2021	Syfy

Between 2000 and 2003, the first two films were each released twice on DVD by New Concorde, while the third film was released once. These releases featured the Massacre Collection banner. In 2010, all three of the Slumber Party Massacre films were released as a triple feature DVD by Shout! Factory as part of the company's Roger Corman's Cult Classics DVD series.

Shout! Factory released The Slumber Party Massacre on Blu-ray for the first time in March 2014, and on January 17, 2017, Slumber Party Massacre II and III were released as a double feature Blu-ray, also by Shout! Factory. None of these releases featured the Massacre Collection epithet that the New Concorde DVD releases had.

Shout! Factory released a limited edition of the first film on Blu-ray in January 2020, featuring new extras and a steelbook.

A remake, directed by Danishka Esterhazy and simply titled Slumber Party Massacre, premiered on Syfy in 2021.

=== Sorority House Massacre series ===
Year	Title	Director	Massacre Collection release	
Year	Title	Director	Date	Format
1986	Sorority House Massacre	Carol Frank	September 17, 2002; July 22, 2003; June 22, 2004	Standalone DVD; Double feature DVD
1990	Sorority House Massacre II	Jim Wynorski	September 17, 2002; July 22, 2003; June 22, 2004	Standalone DVD; Double feature DVD
1990	Sorority House Massacre III: Hard to Die	Jim Wynorski	September 17, 2002; July 22, 2003; June 22, 2004	Standalone DVD; Double feature DVD
N/A	Sorority House Massacre: The Final Exam	Jim Wynorski	N/A	N/A

Between 2000 and 2004, like the Slumber Party Massacre series, New Concorde released the first two films twice on DVD, while the third film was released once. Sorority House Massacre was released on Blu-ray for the first time on November 3, 2014, by Scorpion Releasing. This release was limited to 1,200 copies. As of February 2025, Sorority House Massacre II and III have not been given a Blu-ray release.

As a result of the DVD release success, fourth Sorority House Massacre film began production in 2001 and wrapped principal photography in February 2002, subtitled Final Exam in August. The film was scheduled for release in 2007 on DVD under a new title, The Legacy, but Roger Corman's Concorde Pictures closed up shop and the film was never released. In March 2015, Jim Wynorski released a poster for the film on his official Facebook page with the title Sorority House Massacre: The Final Exam; of February 2025, it is unknown as to whether or not the film will ever be released, although Sam Phillips reprised her role from the film in Cheerleader Massacre, a direct sequel to The Slumber Party Massacre.

=== Cheerleader Massacre series ===
Year	Title	Director	Massacre Collection release	
Year	Title	Director	Date	Format
2003	Cheerleader Massacre	Jim Wynorski	N/A	N/A
2011	Cheerleader Massacre 2	Brad Rushing	N/A	N/A

The film Cheerleader Massacre, directed by Jim Wynorski, is a semi-direct sequel to the first Slumber Party Massacre film, which itself was followed by a stand-alone sequel titled Cheerleader Massacre 2, directed by Brad Rushing. Cheerleader Massacre was released on DVD in 2003, while Cheerleader Massacre 2 has not been given a release in the United States. As of February 2025, neither film has been given a Blu-ray release.

== Stand-alone films ==
In 2015, Jim Wynorski directed a spin-off of the series, titled Sharkansas Women's Prison Massacre.

== Other media ==
A television series based on the Sorority House Massacre sub-series is in the works by Norman Reedus.

== Cast and characters ==
List indicators
- This table shows the principal characters and the actors who have portrayed them throughout the franchise.
- A dark grey cell indicates the character was not in the film, or that the character's presence in the film has not yet been announced.
- A ^{C} indicates a cameo appearance.
- A ^{P} indicates an appearance in onscreen photographs only.
- A ^{A} indicates an appearance in archival footage only.
- A ^{U} indicates an uncredited role.
- A ^{V} indicates a voice-only role.
- A ^{Y} indicates a younger version of the role.

Character	Slumber Party Massacre				Sorority House Massacre			Cheerleader Massacre		Sharkansas Women's Prison Massacre
Character	The Slumber Party Massacre	Slumber Party Massacre II	Slumber Party Massacre III	Slumber Party Massacre	Sorority House Massacre	Sorority House Massacre II	Sorority House Massacre III	Cheerleader Massacre	Cheerleader Massacre 2	Sharkansas Women's Prison Massacre
Character	1982	1987	1990	2021	1987	1990		2003	2011	2015
Russ Thorn Hockstatter 'The Driller Killer'	Michael Villella	Atanas Ilitch		Rob van Vuuren		Michael Villella^{A} (Note: Additionally, Melissa Moore and Gail Harris portray Hockstatter when his ghost possesses their characters.)	Michael Villella^{A}			
Trish Devereaux	Michele Michaels			Schelaine Bennett Masali Baduza^{Y}		Michele Michaels^{U}^{A}	Michele Michaels^{U}^{A}			
Valerie Bates	Robin Stille	Cindy Eilbacher				Robin Stille^{U}^{A}	Robin Stille^{U}^{A}			
Courtney Bates	Jennifer Meyers	Crystal Bernard				Jennifer Meyers^{U}^{A}	Jennifer Meyers^{U}^{A}			
Kim Clarke	Debra Deliso			Reem Koussa		Debra Deliso^{U}^{A}	Debra Deliso^{U}^{A}			
Diane	Gina Mari		Brandi Burkett	Larissa Crafford-Lazarus		Gina Mari^{U}^{A}	Lindsay Taylor			
Jackie Cassidy	Andree Honore		Keely Christian	Jane de Wet			Debra Dare			
Linda Dawn Grant	Brinke Stevens				Wendy Martel	Gail Harris	Gail Harris	Brinke Stevens		
Coach Rachel Jana	Pamela Roylance					Pamela Roylance^{U}^{A}	Pamela Roylance^{U}^{A}			
John Raden Minor	Jim Boyce				Vinnie Bilancio					Oscar de la Rosa
Pizza Boy / Pizza Girl	Aaron Lipstadt		Marta Kober							
Jeff	David Millbern	Scott Westmoreland								
Orville Ketchum						Peter Spellos	Peter Spellos			Chris De Christopher
Brad Plympton House Cop #1						Don Keehed^{C}	Don Keehed^{C}		Eric Acosta	
Jessica 'Tess'						Melissa Moore	Melissa Moore			
Sergeant Phyllis Shawlee						Toni Naples	Toni Naples			
Dr. Ed Newton						Mike Elliott	Forrest J Ackerman			
Candy Shayne						Bridget Carney	Bridget Carney			
Moving Man Cop in Lobby						Bob Sheridan^{C}	Bob Sheridan^{C}			
Messenger House Cop #2						James B. Rogers^{C}	James B. Rogers^{C}			
Director / Principal Mazlo							Jim Wynorski^{C}	Jim Wynorski^{C}		
Gary Jardine								David Summers	Charlie Solomon	
Kelly								Rikki Ray	Jasmine Waltz	
Dr. Carl Reinhardt									Don Margolin	John Callahan
Shannon Hastings									Leena Huff	Amy Holt
Neil	Joe Johnson									
David Contant	Rigg Kennedy									
Mary Telephone Repairwoman	Jean Vargas									
Mrs. Annette Devereaux	Anna Patton									
Mr. Devereaux	Howard Purgason									
Carpenter	Pam Canzano									
Paper Boy	Francis Menendez									
Pam	Amy Aquino^{U}									
Mrs. Bates	Mentioned	Jennifer Rhodes								
Officer Kreuger		Michael Delano			Patrick Fahey					
Officer Voorhies		Hamilton Mitchell			Bob Moore					
Amy		Kimberly McArthur								
Sheila Barrington		Juliette Cummins								
Matt Arbicost		Patrick Lowe								
Sally Burns		Heidi Kozak								
T.J.		Joel Hoffman								
Car Driver		Marshall LaPlante								
Mr. Damnkids		Don Daniel								
Lieutenant Mike Block			Garon Grigsby			Jürgen Baum	Jürgen Baum			Serafin Falcon
Sarah Mason			Devon Jenkin		Pamela Ross					Skye McDonald
Suzanne "Susie"			Maria Claire		Ivory Berry	Barbii				
Tom			David Kriegel						Geoff Wilson	
Deputy Frank Barnes			David Lawrence						Roddy Jessup	
Ken			Brittain Frye							
Morgan			M.K. Harris							
Duncan			David Greenlee							
Janine			Hope Marie Carlton							
Maria			Maria Ford							
Juliette			Lulu Wilson							
Detective Davis			Alexander Falk							
Officer O'Reilly			Wayne Grace							
The Weirdo			Yan Birch							
Uncle Billy			Ron Smith							
Dana Devereaux				Hannah Gonera						
Maeve				Frances Sholto-Douglas						
Breanie				Alex McGregor						
Alix				Mila Rayne						
Ashley				Reze-Tiana Wessels						
Kay Thorn				Jennifer Steyn						
John Raden Minor Jr.				Michael Lawrence Potter						
Chad				Arthur Falko						
Sean				Nathan Castle						
Matt				Eden Classens						
Guy #1				Richard White						
Guy #2				Braeden Buys						
Dave Contant Jr.				Richard Wright-Firth						
Laura 'Beth' Henkel					Angela O'Neill				Sara Kova	
Cindy					Susan Bollman				Angel Monroe	
Larry Bronkowski					Axel Roberts		Domonic Muir			
Tracy					Nicole Rio					
Bobby Henkel					John C. Russell					
Andy					Marcus Vaughter					
Craig					Joe Nassi					
Mrs. Lawrence					Mary Anne					
Dr. Lindsey					Gillian Frank					
Technician					Joseph Mansier					
Detective Gilbert					Fitzhough Huston					
Nurse					Marsha Carter					
Professor					Maureen Hawkes					
Night Orderly					Alan Eugster					
Teacher					Phyllis Frank					
Steve					Thomas R. Mustin					
Shop Owner					Ray Spinka					
Gas Station Woman					Hammer					
U-Hauler					Todd Darling					
U-Helper					Jon Hofferman					
Laura					Hillary Hollingsworth					
Cathy					Aimee Brooks					
Janet					Kara Joy					
Mother					Shirley Aldrige					
Father					Scott Martin					
Sorority Girl					Sandy Fury^{U}					
Hospital Orderly					Bob Ivy^{U}					
Kimberly						Stacia Zhivago				
Janey						Dana Bentley				
Cop in Rain						Gunnar Johnson				
Bartender						Eric Hoffman				
Abdul						Carlo Jonzi				
Schmabdul						Hassan Feffer				
Godfather						Emil Rochelle				
Satana						Shannon Wilsey				
Bouncer						Alex Tabrizi				
Newscaster						Kevin Tent				
Fifi Latour							Carolet Girard			
Agent							Eric Baum			
Helga							Amelia Sheridan			
Husband							Don Peterson			
Wife							D. Mason Keener			
Cameraman							Greg Lauoi			
Agent's Girlfriend							Cirsten Weldon			
CD Girl							Lucy Burnett			
Pedestrian							Ronald V. Borst			
Ms. Hendricks								Tamie Sheffield		
Parker Jameson								Charity Rahmer		
Angela Caruso								Erin Byron		
Buzzy								Lunk Johnson		
Sheriff Murdock								E. Eddie Edwards		
Officer Phillips								Samantha Phillips		
Deputy Adams								GiGi Erneta		
Tammy Rae								Diana Espin		
Debbie								Nikki Fritz		
Ryan								Tylo Tyler		
Mark								Brad Beck		
Shelley								Summer Williams		
Detective DeMarco								Melissa Brasselle		
Dina								Julie Corgill		
Berman								Steve Mitchell		
Deputy								Rob Sanchez		
Jeremiah McPherson								John Colton		
Kimble								James H. Foster		
Ambulance Driver								Jesse Miller		
Miss Connolly								Sarah Baker		
Marissa								Ashley Blanco		
Buzzy's First Flashback Girl								Julie K. Smith		
Buzzy's Second Flashback Girl								Regina Russell		
Buzzy's Third Flashback Girl								Dana Pine		
Anna									Julia Lehman	
Janice									Michele Boyd	
Sonya									Kari Ruth	
Lisa									Jaclyn Kerhulas	
Victoria									Ashley D. Walsh	
Hector									B.D. Friedman	
Emily									Tricia Hoffman	
Nikki									Kimmy Matich	
Monica									Laura Niles	
Jimmy									Kyle Kinane	
Helen									Tanaya Nicole	
Lindsay Hamilton									Jennifer Titus	
Cliff									Russ Taylor	
Ben									Michael Addison	
Jared									Edward Canossa	
Shawn									Brian Kubach	
Sheriff Jim Colson									Robert Donavan	
Anna's Father									Peter James	
Erica									Cathea Walters	
Casey									Audra Griffis	
Patty									Carly Banks	
Karen									Zoe Britton	
Wendy									Brooke Barnes	
Darren									Scott Rosa	
Hard Hat									Lou Houchin	
Dick									Dave McFarland	
Bloody Woman									Jenae Altschwager	
Mandy									Sabrina Maahs	
Mr. Gannon									Sean Quinn	
Deputy Moore									Billy Ray Orme	
Honey										Dominique Swain
Detective Kendra Patterson										Traci Lords
Michelle Alika										Christine Nguyen
Anita Conners										Cindy Lucas
Samantha Pines										Tabitha Marie
Detective Adam										Corey Landis
White-Haired Bandit										John Archer Lundgren
Sam										Steve Goldenberg
Fred										Robert Hummel
