= List of teen films =

Teen film is a film genre targeted at teenagers and young adults in which the plot is based upon the lives of teenagers and young adults, such as coming of age, first love, rebellion, conflict with parents, teen angst, and alienation and other topics and issues in the personal and professional lives of teenagers and young adults. Some of these films are targeted at adults as well as teenagers. Teen films have been a trope of the cinema industry that grew in popularity in the 1950s. At this time, the film industry saw a greater market for teens with more disposable income and therefore more money to spend on leisure activities, largely going to films. Because of the boom in teen viewers, drive-in movie theaters were also very popular. However, teen films have been produced since the dawn of the 20th century. Recently, online streaming services such as Netflix have created a resurgence in the "tween" and teenage-oriented film.

== Subgenres ==
=== Teen fantasy and science fiction ===
==== Franchises ====
- Star Wars (1977–present)
- The NeverEnding Story film series (1984–1994)
- The Karate Kid (1984–present)
- Back to the Future (1985–present)
- Bill & Ted (1989–present)
- Class of 1999 (1990) and Class of 1999 II: The Substitute (1994)
- Teenage Mutant Ninja Turtles (1990–present)
- Jumanji franchise (1995–present)
- Halloweentown (1998–2006)
- X-Men (2000–2020)
- Harry Potter film series (2001–2011)
- Shrek (2001–present)
- Spider-Man (2002–2007)
- The Chronicles of Narnia (2005–2010)
- Transformers (2007–present)
- The Twilight Saga (2008–2012)
- Marvel Cinematic Universe (2008–present)
- Kung Fu Panda (2008–present)
- Avatar film series (2009–present)
- Kick-Ass (2010) and Kick-Ass 2 (2013)
- Percy Jackson film series (2010–2013)
- How to Train Your Dragon (2010–2019)
- The Amazing Spider-Man (2012–2014)
- The Hunger Games film series (2012–present)
- The Divergent Series (2014–2016)
- Maze Runner film series (2014–2018)
- Fantastic Beasts (2016–2022)
- Sonic the Hedgehog film series (2020–present)

==== Stand-Alone ====
- The 5th Wave (2016)
- Aquamarine (2006)
- Bridge to Terabithia (2007)
- Casper (1995)
- Casper Meets Wendy (1998)
- Chronicle (2012)
- Clockstoppers (2002)
- Donnie Darko (2001)
- Don't Look Under the Bed (1999)
- Edward Scissorhands (1990)
- Ender's Game (2013)
- Ever After (1998)
- Ella Enchanted (2004)
- The Faculty (1998)
- Freaky Friday (2003)
- Girl vs. Monster (2012)
- The Giver (2014)
- Goosebumps (2015)
- Goosebumps 2: Haunted Halloween (2018)
- Hackers (1995)
- Herbie: Fully Loaded (2005)
- Hocus Pocus (1993)
- Hocus Pocus 2 (2022)
- The Host (2013)
- Love, Rosie (2014)
- Mighty Morphin Power Rangers: The Movie (1995)
- Miss Peregrine's Home for Peculiar Children (2016)
- Mamaboy (2017)
- The Mortal Instruments: City of Bones (2013)
- My Science Project (1985)
- Lemony Snicket's A Series of Unfortunate Events (2004)
- Pleasantville (1998)
- Power Rangers (2017)
- Project Almanac (2014)
- Race to Witch Mountain (2009)
- Ready Player One (2018)
- Ron's Gone Wrong (2021)
- Ruby Gillman, Teenage Kraken (2023)
- Scott Pilgrim vs. the World (2010)
- Small Soldiers (1998)
- Soul Snatcher (2020)
- Susie Q (1996)
- Stepsister from Planet Weird (2000)
- Tammy and the T-Rex (1994)
- Teen Witch (1989)
- Teen Wolf (1985)
- Teen Wolf Too (1987)
- Tomorrowland (2015)
- The Sorcerer's Apprentice (2010)
- The Ultimate Christmas Present (2000)
- Thunderbirds (2004)
- Voyagers (2021)
- WarGames (1983)
- WarGames: The Dead Code (2008)
- Weird Science (1985)
- Wish Upon a Star (1996)
- Zenon: Girl of the 21st Century (1999)
- Zenon: The Zequel (2001)
- Zenon: Z3 (2004)

=== Teen animated films ===
- Bebe's Kids (1992)
- Toy Story (1995)
- Beavis and Butt-Head Do America (1996)
- Toy Story 2 (1999)
- Titan A.E. (2000)
- Final Fantasy: The Spirits Within (2001)
- Treasure Planet (2002)
- 9 (2009)
- Toy Story 3 (2010)
- Epic (2013)
- Big Hero 6 (2014)
- Spider-Man: Into the Spider-Verse (2018)
- Abominable (2019)
- Ne Zha (2019)
- Toy Story 4 (2019)
- The Mitchells vs. the Machines (2021)
- Luca (2021)
- Ron's Gone Wrong (2021)
- Turning Red (2022)
- Beavis and Butt-Head Do the Universe (2022)
- Spider-Man: Across the Spider-Verse (2023)
- Nimona (2023)
- Ruby Gillman, Teenage Kraken (2023)
- KPop Demon Hunters (2025)
- Ne Zha 2 (2025)
- Goat (2026)
- Toy Story 5 (2026)
- Minions & Monsters (2026)
- Coyote vs. Acme (2026)
- Forgotten Island (2026)
- Wildwood (2026)
- Hexed (2026)
- The Angry Birds Movie 3 (2026)

=== Teen horror and horror-comedy ===
==== Franchises ====
- The Texas Chainsaw Massacre franchise (1974–2022)
- Black Christmas franchise (1974–2019)
- Carrie franchise (1976–2026)
- Halloween franchise (1978–2022)
- Piranha franchise (1978–2012)
- When a Stranger Calls franchise (1979–2006)
- Friday the 13th franchise (1980–present)
- Prom Night franchise (1980–2008)
- The Slumber Party Massacre (1982), Slumber Party Massacre II (1987), Slumber Party Massacre III (1990) and Slumber Party Massacre (2021)
- The Sleepaway Camp franchise (1983–2012)
- A Nightmare on Elm Street franchise (1984–2010)
- Children of the Corn franchise (1984–2020)
- Silent Night, Deadly Night franchise (1984–2012)
- Fright Night (1985), Fright Night Part 2 (1988), Fright Night (2011), and Fright Night 2: New Blood (2013)
- Return of the Living Dead franchise (1985–2005)
- Teen Wolf franchise (1985–2023)
- The Lost Boys franchise (1987–2010)
- Night of the Demons (1988), Night of the Demons 2 (1994), Night of the Demons 3 (1997), and Night of the Demons (2009)
- Scream franchise (1996–present)
- I Know What You Did Last Summer franchise (1997–2025)
- Urban Legend franchise (1998–present)
- Final Destination franchise (2000–present)
- Scary Movie franchise (2000–present)
- Ginger Snaps (2000), Ginger Snaps 2: Unleashed (2004) and Ginger Snaps Back: The Beginning (2004)
- Cabin Fever franchise (2002–2016)
- The Ring franchise (2002–2017)
- Wrong Turn franchise (2003–2021)
- Zombieland franchise (2009–2019)
- My Super Psycho Sweet 16 franchise (2009–2012)
- Fear Street franchise (2021–present)

==== Stand-alone ====
- American Vampire (1997)
- All Cheerleaders Die (2013)
- All the Boys Love Mandy Lane (2006)
- April Fools (2007)
- April Fool's Day (1986)
- April Fool's Day (2008)
- Babysitter Massacre (2013)
- Bad Reputation (2005)
- The Beast Within (1982)
- Bedeviled (2016)
- Black as Night (2021)
- The Blob (1958)
- The Blob (1988)
- Blood Night: The Legend of Mary Hatchet (2009)
- Bloody Murder (2000)
- Bloody Murder 2: Closing Camp (2003)
- Bodom (2016)
- Bring It On: Cheer or Die (2022)
- Buffy the Vampire Slayer (1992)
- The Burning (1981)
- The Cabin in the Woods (2012)
- The Covenant (2006)
- The Craft (1996)
- The Craft: Legacy (2020)
- The Crush (1993)
- Evil Toons (1992)
- Campfire Tales (1997)
- Camp Slaughter (2005)
- Cannibal Campout (1988)
- Cherry Falls (2000)
- Cheerleader Massacre (2003)
- Christine (1983)
- Cry Wolf (2005)
- Dance of the Dead (2008)
- Deadgirl (2008)
- Deadly Friend (1986)
- Deathgasm (2015)
- Death Note (2017)
- Disturbing Behavior (1998)
- Disturbia (2007)
- Dr. Chopper (2005)
- Embrace of the Vampire (2013)
- Fear (1996)
- The Final Girls (2015)
- Forget Me Not (2009)
- Freaky (2020)
- Friend Request (2016)
- Flowers in the Attic (1987)
- The Girl Next Door (2007)
- Gossip (2000)
- Graduation Day (1981)
- The Gallows (2015)
- The Glass House (2001)
- Happy Birthday to Me (1981)
- Happy Death Day (2017)
- Happy Death Day 2U (2019)
- Haunting on Fraternity Row (2018)
- The Haunting of Sorority Row (2007)
- Hell's Highway (2002)
- Hell Night (1982)
- Horror (2015)
- The Hollow (2004)
- The Hook of Woodland Heights (1990)
- The House on Sorority Row (1983)
- House of Wax (2005)
- The Howling: Reborn (2011)
- Idle Hands (1999)
- I Was a Teenage Frankenstein (1957)
- I Was a Teenage Werewolf (1957)
- Initiation (2020)
- The Invisible (2007)
- It (2017)
- It Follows (2014)
- Jeepers Creepers (2001)
- Jeepers Creepers 2 (2003)
- Jennifer's Body (2009)
- Lovers Lane (1999 film) (1999)
- The Haunting of Molly Hartley (2008)
- The Last House on the Left (1972)
- The Last House on the Left (2009)
- Link (1986)
- The Loved Ones (2009)
- Ma (2019)
- Maniacal (2003)
- Memorial Day (1999)
- Mom's Got a Date with a Vampire (2000)
- Mother, May I Sleep With Danger? (1996)
- Mr. Jingles (2006)
- Mirror, Mirror (1990)
- The Mutilator (1985)
- My Best Friend's Exorcism (2022)
- My Soul to Take (2010)
- My Sucky Teen Romance (2011)
- The New Mutants (2020)
- The Night Brings Charlie (1990)
- Nobody Gets Out Alive (2012)
- The Open House (2018)
- Ouija (2014)
- The Doll Master (2022)
- Psycho Beach Party (2000)
- The Prowler (1981)
- The Roommate (2011)
- Remember the Daze (2007)
- Queen of the Damned (2002)
- Run (2020)
- Scouts Guide to the Zombie Apocalypse (2015)
- Scream for Help (1984)
- See No Evil (2006)
- See No Evil 2 (2014)
- Shrunken Heads (1994)
- The Skulls (2000)
- Sledgehammer (1983)
- Slender Man (2018)
- The Sleeper (2012)
- There's Someone Inside Your House (2021)
- Sorority House Massacre (1986)
- Sorority Row (2009)
- Student Bodies (1981)
- Swimfan (2002)
- Teaching Mrs. Tingle (1999)
- Teen Wolf: The Movie (2023)
- Terror Toons (2002)
- Terror Train (1980)
- ThanksKilling (2008)
- The Town That Dreaded Sundown (1976)
- The Town That Dreaded Sundown (2014)
- Trailer Park of Terror (2008)
- Treehouse (2014)
- Trick or Treat (1986)
- Trick 'r Treat (2007)
- Truth or Dare (2018)
- Unfriended (2014)
- Unfriended: Dark Web (2018)
- Until Dawn (2025)
- Vamp (1986)
- Vampire Academy (2014)
- We Summon the Darkness (2019)
- Y2K (2024)

=== Teen musicals ===
==== Franchises ====
- A Cinderella Story film series (2004–2021)
- Camp Rock (2008), Camp Rock 2: The Final Jam (2010) and Camp Rock 3 (2026)
- Center Stage (2000), Center Stage: Turn It Up (2008) and Center Stage: On Pointe (2016)
- The Cheetah Girls (2003), The Cheetah Girls 2 (2006) and The Cheetah Girls: One World (2008)
- Descendants (2015), Descendants 2 (2017) and Descendants 3 (2019)
- Dirty Dancing (1987), Dirty Dancing: Havana Nights (2004) and Dirty Dancing (2017)
- Fame (1980) and Fame (2009)
- Footloose (1984) and Footloose (2011)
- Grease (1978) and Grease 2 (1982)
- Hairspray (1988) and Hairspray (2007)
- High School Musical (2006), High School Musical 2 (2007) and High School Musical 3: Senior Year (2008)
- Pitch Perfect (2012), Pitch Perfect 2 (2015) and Pitch Perfect 3 (2017)
- Teen Beach Movie (2013) and Teen Beach 2 (2015)
- Zombies (2018) and Zombies 2 (2020)
- West Side Story (1961) and West Side Story (2021)
- Valley Girl (1983) and Valley Girl (2020)

==== Stand-Alone ====
- Confessions of a Teenage Drama Queen (2004)
- Coyote Ugly (2000)
- Cry-Baby (1990)
- Flashdance (1983)
- Freaky Friday (2018)
- Hannah Montana: The Movie (2009)
- KPop Demon Hunters (2025)
- Sharpay's Fabulous Adventure (2011)
- Sing Street (2016)
- Spin (2021)
- Summer Forever (2015)
- The Prom (2020)
- Teen Spirit (2018)
- Downfalls High (2021)
- Dear Evan Hansen (2021)
- A Week Away (2021)
- Metal Lords (2022)
- Mean Girls (2024)

=== Teen comedy and teen drama ===
==== 1910s ====
- Hearts Adrift (1914)
- Rebecca of Sunnybrook Farm (1917)

==== 1920s ====
- The Flapper (1920)
- My Best Girl (1927)
- Coquette (1929)

==== 1930s ====
- Wild Boys of the Road (1933)
- Finishing School (1934)
- Reefer Madness (1936)
- A Family Affair (1937)
- You're Only Young Once (1937)
- Girls' School (1938)
- Judge Hardy's Children (1938)
- Out West with the Hardys (1938)
- Love Finds Andy Hardy (1938)
- Andy Hardy Gets Spring Fever (1939)
- Boys' Reformatory (1939)
- The Hardys Ride High (1939)
- Judge Hardy and Son (1939)
- The Wizard of Oz (1939)

==== 1940s ====
- Andy Hardy Meets Debutante (1940)
- Strike Up the Band (1940)
- Andy Hardy's Private Secretary (1941)
- Life Begins for Andy Hardy (1941)
- Andy Hardy's Double Life (1942)
- The Courtship of Andy Hardy (1942)
- Miss Annie Rooney (1942)
- Rudyard Kipling's Jungle Book (1942)
- Andy Hardy's Blonde Trouble (1944)
- Love Laughs at Andy Hardy (1946)
- The Blue Lagoon (1949)

==== 1950s ====
- Glen or Glenda (1953)
- The Wild One (1953)
- Blackboard Jungle (1955)
- Rebel Without a Cause (1955)
- The Girl Can't Help It (1956)
- Rock Around the Clock (1956)
- Rock, Rock, Rock (1956)
- Teenage Rebel (1956)
- April Love (1957)
- Attack of the Crab Monsters (1957)
- Don't Knock the Rock (1957)
- Jailhouse Rock (1957)
- Not of This Earth (1957)
- Sorority Girl (1957)
- Tammy and the Bachelor (1957)
- Teenage Doll (1957)
- A Bucket of Blood (1958)
- High School Confidential (1958)
- King Creole (1958)
- Blue Denim (1959)
- Gidget (1959)
- A Summer Place (1959)
- The Wasp Woman (1959)

==== 1960s ====
- Because They're Young (1960)
- The Virgin Spring (1960)
- Where the Boys Are (1960)
- The Explosive Generation (1961)
- Splendor in the Grass (1961)
- West Side Story (1961)
- Beach Party (1963)
- Bye Bye Birdie (1963)
- Bikini Beach (1964)
- A Hard Day's Night (1964)
- The Horror of Party Beach (1964)
- The Leather Boys (1964)
- Muscle Beach Party (1964)
- Pajama Party (1964)
- Ride the Wild Surf (1964)
- Surf Party (1964)
- Beach Blanket Bingo (1965)
- How to Stuff a Wild Bikini (1965)
- Rapture (1965)
- Wild on the Beach (1965)
- The Graduate (1967)
- The Love-Ins (1967)
- To Sir, with Love (1967)
- High School (1968)
- Romeo and Juliet (1968)
- Easy Rider (1969)
- Last Summer (1969)
- The Sterile Cuckoo (1969)
- The First Time (1969)

==== 1970s ====
- A Swedish Love Story (1970)
- Beyond the Valley of the Dolls (1970)
- Taste the Blood of Dracula (1970)
- Carnal Knowledge (1971)
- The Last Picture Show (1971)
- Summer of '42 (1971)
- To Find a Man (1972)
- Class of '44 (1973)
- American Graffiti (1973)
- The Harrad Experiment (1973)
- The Lords of Flatbush (1974)
- Our Time (1974)
- Cooley High (1975)*
- À nous les petites Anglaises (1976)
- Freaky Friday (1976)
- The Little Girl Who Lives Down the Lane (1976)
- Saturday Night Fever (1977)
- Big Wednesday (1978)
- I Wanna Hold Your Hand (1978)
- Ice Castles (1978)
- Lemon Popsicle (1978)
- National Lampoon's Animal House (1978)
- Rosie Dixon – Night Nurse (1978)
- Summer of My German Soldier (1978)
- Thank God It's Friday (1978)
- A Little Romance (1979)
- Boulevard Nights (1979)
- Breaking Away (1979)
- Meatballs (1979)
- More American Graffiti (1979)
- Over the Edge (1979)
- Quadrophenia (1979)
- Rock 'n' Roll High School (1979)
- Roller Boogie (1979)
- Skatetown, U.S.A. (1979)
- The Wanderers (1979)
- The Warriors (1979)

==== 1980s ====
- The Blue Lagoon (1980)
- La Boum (1980)
- Foxes (1980)
- The Hollywood Knights (1980)
- Little Darlings (1980)
- My Bodyguard (1980)
- Endless Love (1981)
- Private Lessons (1981)
- Gregory's Girl (1981)
- Class of 1984 (1982)
- Desperate Lives (1982)
- Fast Times at Ridgemont High (1982)
- Homework (1982)
- The Last American Virgin (1982)
- Porky's (1982)
- The Slumber Party Massacre (1982)
- Zapped! (1982)
- All The Right Moves (1983)
- Bad Boys (1983)
- Losin' It (1983)
- My Tutor (1983)
- The Outsiders (1983)
- Porky's II: The Next Day (1983)
- Private School (1983)
- Risky Business (1983)
- Rumble Fish (1983)
- Valley Girl (1983)
- Bad Manners (1984)
- Beat Street (1984)
- Firstborn (1984)
- The Flamingo Kid (1984)
- High Schools (1984)
- The Karate Kid (1984)
- Lovelines (1984)
- Red Dawn (1984)
- Revenge of the Nerds (1984)
- Sixteen Candles (1984)
- Where the Boys Are '84 (1984)
- The Wild Life (1984)
- Better Off Dead (1985)
- The Breakfast Club (1985)
- Girls Just Want to Have Fun (1985)
- The Goonies (1985)
- Heaven Help Us (1985)
- The Heavenly Kid (1985)
- Just One of the Guys (1985)
- The Legend of Billie Jean (1985)
- Mischief (1985)
- Porky's Revenge (1985)
- Real Genius (1985)
- St. Elmo's Fire (1985)
- Secret Admirer (1985)
- A Summer in a Sea Shell (1985)
- The Sure Thing (1985)
- Tomboy (1985)
- Tuff Turf (1985)
- Vision Quest (1985)
- Weird Science (1985)
- Young Sherlock Holmes (1985)
- The Boy Who Could Fly (1986)
- Ferris Bueller's Day Off (1986)
- Fire with Fire (1986)
- Hoosiers (1986)
- The Karate Kid Part II (1986)
- Labyrinth (1986)
- Lucas (1986)
- Peggy Sue Got Married (1986)
- Pretty in Pink (1986)
- River's Edge (1986)
- Stand by Me (1986)
- Welcome to 18 (1986)
- Wildcats (1986)
- The Allnighter (1987)
- Can't Buy Me Love (1987)
- Dirty Dancing (1987)
- Hiding Out (1987)
- Hunk (1987)
- Revenge of the Nerds II: Nerds in Paradise (1987)
- Some Kind of Wonderful (1987)
- Summer School (1987)
- Three for the Road (1987)
- Three O'Clock High (1987)
- The Year My Voice Broke (1987)
- Wish You Were Here (1987)
- Aloha Summer (1988)
- Fresh Horses (1988)
- For Keeps (1988)
- Heathers (1988)
- The In Crowd (1988)
- Johnny Be Good (1988)
- License to Drive (1988)
- Satisfaction (1988)
- Dead Poets Society (1989)
- Homework (1989)
- How I Got Into College (1989)
- The Karate Kid Part III (1989)
- Lean on Me (1989)
- The Rachel Papers (1989)
- Say Anything... (1989)
- Shag (1989)
- She's Out of Control (1989)
- Under the Boardwalk (1989)

==== 1990s ====
===== 1990–1994 =====
- The Book of Love (1990)
- Camp Cucamonga (1990)
- Cry-Baby (1990)
- Edward Scissorhands (1990)
- Getting Lucky (1990)
- House Party (1990)
- Home Alone (1990)
- Mermaids (1990)
- Metropolitan (1990)
- Zapped Again! (1990)
- Pump Up the Volume (1990)
- Welcome Home, Roxy Carmichael (1990)
- The Addams Family (1991)
- Boyz n the Hood (1991)
- Dream Machine (1991)
- Dogfight (1991)
- House Party 2 (1991)
- The Man in the Moon (1991)
- My Girl (1991)
- Mystery Date (1991)
- Return to the Blue Lagoon (1991)
- Don't Tell Mom the Babysitter's Dead (1991)
- Straight Out of Brooklyn (1991)
- Flirting (1991)
- Toy Soldiers (1991)
- Young Soul Rebels (1991)
- A River Runs Through It (1992)
- Class Act (1992)
- 3 Ninjas (1992)
- Encino Man (1992)
- Home Alone 2: Lost in New York (1992)
- Just Another Girl on the I.R.T. (1992)
- Newsies (1992)
- Poison Ivy (1992)
- School Ties (1992)
- Where the Day Takes You (1992)
- Zebrahead (1992)
- Airborne (1993)
- Anything for Love (1993)
- Addams Family Values (1993)
- Dazed and Confused (1993)
- Hocus Pocus (1993)
- Matinee (1993)
- Menace II Society (1993)
- My Boyfriend's Back (1993)
- Poetic Justice (1993)
- Rudy (1993)
- Sister Act 2: Back in the Habit (1993)
- The Crush (1993)
- This Boy's Life (1993)
- Totally F***ed Up (1993)
- What's Eating Gilbert Grape (1993)
- 3 Ninjas Kick Back (1994)
- Above the Rim (1994)
- Blank Check (1994)
- Camp Nowhere (1994)
- Heavenly Creatures (1994)
- Hoop Dreams (1994)
- House Party 3 (1994)
- My Girl 2 (1994)
- The Next Karate Kid (1994)
- S.F.W. (1994)
- The Stoned Age (1994)

===== 1995–1999 =====
- The Brady Bunch Movie (1995)
- Casper (1995)
- PCU (1995)
- Angus (1995)
- The Baby-Sitters Club (1995)
- Babe (1995)
- The Basketball Diaries (1995)
- Clueless (1995)
- Dangerous Minds (1995)
- The Doom Generation (1995)
- Empire Records (1995)
- Glory Daze (1995)
- Hackers (1995)
- Heavyweights (1995)
- The Incredibly True Adventure of Two Girls in Love (1995)
- Kids (1995)
- Mallrats (1995)
- Man of the House (1995)
- My Teacher's Wife (1995)
- Now and Then (1995)
- Sixty Million Dollar Man (1995)
- Tom and Huck (1995)
- Welcome to the Dollhouse (1995)
- Beautiful Thing (1996)
- D3: The Mighty Ducks (1996)
- Demolition High (1996)
- Flipper (1996)
- Fly Away Home (1996)
- Foxfire (1996)
- Girls Town (1996)
- High School High (1996)
- House Arrest (1996)
- Night of the Twisters (1996)
- Romeo + Juliet (1996)
- SubUrbia (1996)
- Sunset Park (1996)
- Susie Q (1996)
- The Substitute (1996)
- A Very Brady Sequel (1996)
- All Over Me (1997)
- Boogie Nights (1997)
- Born Into Exile (1997)
- The Boys Club (1997)
- Excess Baggage (1997)
- Good Burger (1997)
- Going All the Way (1997)
- Hurricane Streets (1997)
- Inventing the Abbotts (1997)
- Masterminds (1997)
- Nowhere (1997)
- Romy and Michele's High School Reunion (1997)
- Trojan War (1997)
- Spice World (1997)
- Wild America (1997)
- A Cool, Dry Place (1998)
- Buffalo '66 (1998)
- 54 (1998)
- The Adventures of Sebastian Cole (1998)
- Billboard Dad (1998)
- Brink! (1998)
- All I Wanna Do (1998)
- Can't Hardly Wait (1998)
- Dead Man on Campus (1998)
- Edge of Seventeen (1998)
- Ever After (1998)
- Get Real (1998)
- Girl (1998)
- Halloweentown (1998)
- I'll Be Home for Christmas (1998)
- My Date with the President's Daughter (1998)
- The Opposite of Sex (1998)
- Overnight Delivery (1998)
- The Parent Trap (1998)
- Pecker (1998)
- Pleasantville (1998)
- Rushmore (1998)
- SLC Punk! (1998)
- Starstruck (1998)
- Urban Legend (1998)
- Wild Things (1998)
- 10 Things I Hate About You (1999)
- American Beauty (1999)
- American Pie (1999)
- Anywhere But Here (1999)
- Body Shots (1999)
- Boys Don't Cry (1999)
- But I'm a Cheerleader (1999)
- Coming Soon (1999)
- Cruel Intentions (1999)
- Detroit Rock City (1999)
- Dick (1999)
- Don't Look Under the Bed (1999)
- Drive Me Crazy (1999)
- Drop Dead Gorgeous (1999)
- Election (1999)
- Genius (1999)
- Get Real (1999)
- Go (1999)
- Jawbreaker (1999)
- Light It Up (1999)
- Never Been Kissed (1999)
- October Sky (1999)
- Outside Providence (1999)
- Passport to Paris (1999)
- She's All That (1999)
- Smart House (1999)
- Superstar (1999)
- Tail Lights Fade (1999)
- Trippin' (1999)
- Varsity Blues (1999)
- The Virgin Suicides (1999)
- Virtual Sexuality (1999)

==== 2000s ====
===== 2000–2004 =====
- 100 Girls (2000)
- Almost Famous (2000)
- Boys and Girls (2000)
- Bring It On (2000)
- Center Stage (2000)
- Down to You (2000)
- Girlfight (2000)
- Here on Earth (2000)
- The In Crowd (2000)
- Life-Size (2000)
- Loser (2000)
- Love & Basketball (2000)
- The Other Me (2000)
- Quints (2000)
- Remember the Titans (2000)
- Rip Girls (2000)
- Road Trip (2000)
- Romeo Must Die (2000)
- Scary Movie (2000)
- Secret Cutting (2000)
- Seventeen Again (2000)
- The Smokers (2000)
- Whatever It Takes (2000)
- American Pie 2 (2001)
- Bully (2001)
- Crazy/Beautiful (2001)
- Get Over It (2001)
- Ghost World (2001)
- Halloweentown II: Kalabar's Revenge (2001)
- Happy Campers (2001)
- Harvard Man (2001)
- How High (2001)
- Holiday in the Sun (2001)
- House Party 4: Down to the Last Minute (2001)
- Josie and the Pussycats (2001)
- Legally Blonde (2001)
- Little Secrets (2001)
- L.I.E. (2001)
- Not Another Teen Movie (2001)
- O (2001)
- Prozac Nation (2001)
- The Princess Diaries (2001)
- Save the Last Dance (2001)
- Saving Silverman (2001)
- Sol Goode (2001)
- Sugar & Spice (2001)
- Summer Catch (2001)
- Wet Hot American Summer (2001)
- Valentine (2001)
- 40 Days and 40 Nights (2002)
- Cadet Kelly (2002)
- Cheats (2002)
- Crossroads (2002)
- Drumline (2002)
- Get a Clue (2002)
- Getting There (2002)
- Bend it Like Beckham (2002)
- Big Fat Liar (2002)
- Blue Crush (2002)
- Murder by Numbers (2002)
- Like Mike (2002)
- Lilja 4-ever (2002)
- The Hot Chick (2002)
- The New Guy (2002)
- Orange County (2002)
- Pumpkin (2002)
- Slackers (2002)
- Scooby-Doo (2002)
- Sorority Boys (2002)
- Tru Confessions (2002)
- The Red Sneakers (2002)
- A Walk to Remember (2002)
- When in Rome (2002)
- American Wedding (2003)
- Agent Cody Banks (2003)
- Cheaper by the Dozen (2003)
- Dumb and Dumberer: When Harry Met Lloyd (2003)
- Elephant (2003)
- Grind (2003)
- Holes (2003)
- How to Deal (2003)
- Legally Blonde 2: Red, White & Blonde (2003)
- Love Don't Cost a Thing (2003)
- My Boss's Daughter (2003)
- Thirteen (2003)
- The Challenge (2003)
- The Lizzie McGuire Movie (2003)
- Freaky Friday (2003)
- Peter Pan (2003)
- School of Rock (2003)
- What a Girl Wants (2003)
- Zero Day (2003)
- Agent Cody Banks 2: Destination London (2004)
- Bring It On Again (2004)
- Catch That Kid (2004)
- Chasing Liberty (2004)
- A Cinderella Story (2004)
- Christmas with the Kranks (2004)
- Dirty Dancing: Havana Nights (2004)
- EuroTrip (2004)
- Fat Albert (2004)
- First Daughter (2004)
- Friday Night Lights (2004)
- Halloweentown High (2004)
- The Girl Next Door (2004)
- Mean Girls (2004)
- Napoleon Dynamite (2004)
- New York Minute (2004)
- The Perfect Score (2004)
- The Princess Diaries 2: Royal Engagement (2004)
- Raise Your Voice (2004)
- Saved! (2004)
- Scooby-Doo 2: Monsters Unleashed (2004)
- Sleepover (2004)
- Speak (2004)
- 13 Going on 30 (2004)
- Wild Things 2 (2004)
- You Got Served (2004)

===== 2005–2009 =====
- American Pie Presents: Band Camp (2005)
- The Chumscrubber (2005)
- Coach Carter (2005)
- Cheaper by the Dozen 2 (2005)
- Dirty Deeds (2005)
- Havoc (2005)
- Ice Princess (2005)
- Just Friends (2005)
- Love Wrecked (2005)
- Pretty Persuasion (2005)
- Roll Bounce (2005)
- Romy and Michele: In the Beginning (2005)
- Spring Break Shark Attack (2005)
- The Perfect Man (2005)
- The Sisterhood of the Traveling Pants (2005)
- Sky High (2005)
- Thumbsucker (2005)
- Wild Things: Diamonds in the Rough (2005)
- Waiting... (2005)
- Accepted (2006)
- All You've Got (2006)
- Alpha Dog (2006)
- American Pie Presents: The Naked Mile (2006)
- ATL (2006)
- Bickford Shmeckler's Cool Ideas (2006)
- Brick (2006)
- Bring It On: All or Nothing (2006)
- Cow Belles (2006)
- Half Nelson (2006)
- Mini's First Time (2006)
- The Curiosity of Chance (2006)
- It's a Boy Girl Thing (2006)
- Hoot (2006)
- How to Eat Fried Worms (2006)
- John Tucker Must Die (2006)
- Kidulthood (2006)
- Like Mike 2: Streetball (2006)
- Material Girls (2006)
- Return to Halloweentown (2006)
- She's the Man (2006)
- Step Up (2006)
- Stick It (2006)
- American Pie Presents: Beta House (2007)
- An American Crime (2007)
- Bratz (2007)
- Bring It On: In It to Win It (2007)
- Charlie Bartlett (2007)
- Freedom Writers (2007)
- Juno (2007)
- Nancy Drew (2007)
- Rocket Science (2007)
- Stomp the Yard (2007)
- Super Sweet 16: The Movie (2007)
- Superbad (2007)
- Sydney White (2007)
- Adulthood (2008)
- American Teen (2008)
- Angus, Thongs and Perfect Snogging (2008)
- Assassination of a High School President (2008)
- The Class (2008)
- The Clique (2008)
- College (2008)
- College Road Trip (2008)
- Drillbit Taylor (2008)
- The House Bunny (2008)
- Fab Five: The Texas Cheerleader Scandal (2008)
- Never Back Down (2008)
- Nick and Norah's Infinite Playlist (2008)
- Picture This (2008)
- Sex Drive (2008)
- The Sisterhood of the Traveling Pants 2 (2008)
- Slumdog Millionaire (2008)
- Die Welle (The Wave) (2008)
- Step Up 2: The Streets (2008)
- Wild Child (2008)
- Zack and Miri Make a Porno (2008)
- 17 Again (2009)
- 18-Year-Old Virgin (2009)
- Adventureland (2009)
- American Pie Presents: The Book of Love (2009)
- Bandslam (2009)
- Bring It On: Fight to the Finish (2009)
- Dare (2009)
- An Education (2009)
- Fired Up! (2009)
- The French Kissers (2009)
- Genova (2009)
- I Love You, Beth Cooper (2009)
- The Lovely Bones (2009)
- Miss March (2009)
- Nowhere Boy (2009)
- Precious (2009)
- Porky's Pimpin' Pee Wee (2009)
- Samson and Delilah (2009)
- Sorority Wars (2009)
- Tanner Hall (2009)
- Whip It (2009)
- Wild Cherry (2009)

==== 2010s ====
===== 2010–2014 =====
- Alice in Wonderland (2010)
- 16 Wishes (2010)
- Talea (2013)
- The Boy Who Cried Werewolf (2010)
- Dirty Girl (2010)
- Easy A (2010)
- Flipped (2010)
- Frozen (2010)
- High School (2010)
- Ice Castles (2010)
- It's Kind of a Funny Story (2010)
- L'Animale (2018)
- The Last Song (2010)
- The Myth of the American Sleepover (2010)
- Triple Dog (2010)
- Starstruck (2010)
- Step Up 3D (2010)
- Altitude (2010)
- Submarine (2010)
- The Virginity Hit (2010)
- Wild Things: Foursome (2010)
- Abduction (2011)
- Attack the Block (2011)
- The Art of Getting By (2011)
- Soul Surfer (2011)
- Beastly (2011)
- Beneath the Darkness (2011)
- Chalet Girl (2011)
- Cyberbully (2011)
- I Am Number Four (2011)
- Geek Charming (2011)
- Like Crazy (2011)
- Mean Girls 2 (2011)
- Little Birds (2011)
- Born to Race (2011)
- Sucker Punch (2011)
- Pariah (2011)
- Prom (2011)
- American Reunion (2012)
- 21 Jump Street (2012)
- Blue Lagoon: The Awakening (2012)
- Call Girl (2012)
- Detention of the Dead (2012)
- Disconnect (2012)
- The First Time (2012)
- Frenemies (2012)
- Fun Size (2012)
- Ginger & Rosa (2012)
- Let it Shine (2012)
- LOL (2012)
- Mac & Devin Go to High School (2012)
- Now Is Good (2012)
- The Perks of Being a Wallflower (2012)
- Project X (2012)
- Radio Rebel (2012)
- Rags (2012)
- Snow White and the Huntsman (2012)
- Spring Breakers (2012)
- Step Up Revolution (2012)
- Student of the Year (2012)
- The Unspeakable Act (2012)
- We the Party (2012)
- Getaway (2013)
- The Frozen Ground (2013)
- Jinxed (2013)
- 21 and Over (2013)
- 23 Blast (2013)
- After the Dark (2013)
- As Cool As I Am (2013)
- Beautiful Creatures (2013)
- The Bling Ring (2013)
- G.B.F. (2013)
- Geography Club (2013)
- House Party: Tonight's the Night (2013)
- The Kings of Summer (2013)
- The Spectacular Now (2013)
- Struck by Lightning (2013)
- The To Do List (2013)
- Very Good Girls (2013)
- Warm Bodies (2013)
- The Way, Way Back (2013)
- Wetlands (2013)
- White Rabbit (2013)
- 22 Jump Street (2014)
- Affluenza (2014)
- Barely Lethal (2014)
- Behaving Badly (2014)
- Boyhood (2014)
- Cloud 9 (2014)
- Date and Switch (2014)
- Endless Love (2014)
- Step Up: All In (2014)
- The Fault in Our Stars (2014)
- How to Build a Better Boy (2014)
- If I Stay (2014)
- Neighbors (2014)
- Laggies (2014)
- Love, Rosie (2014)
- Dear White People (2014)
- Men, Women & Children (2014)
- Palo Alto (2014)
- School Dance (2014)
- Zapped (2014)

===== 2015–2019 =====
- Bad Hair Day (2015)
- Brotherly Love (2015)
- Closet Monster (2015)
- Cyberbully (2015)
- The Diary of a Teenage Girl (2015)
- Dope (2015)
- The Duff (2015)
- A Girl Like Her (2015)
- Invisible Sister (2015)
- Me & Earl & the Dying Girl (2015)
- Paper Towns (2015)
- Staten Island Summer (2015)
- Descendants (2015)
- Being Charlie (2015)
- The 5th Wave (2016)
- Adventures in Babysitting (2016)
- Be Somebody (2016)
- The Edge of Seventeen (2016)
- Everybody Wants Some!! (2016)
- The Fundamentals of Caring (2016)
- Handsome Devil (2016)
- I'm Not Ashamed (2016)
- Neighbors 2: Sorority Rising (2016)
- Nerve (2016)
- Middle School: The Worst Years of My Life (2016)
- Morris from America (2016)
- November Criminals (2016)
- The Outskirts (2016)
- Shovel Buddies (2016)
- Slash (2016)
- The Swap (2016)
- American Honey (2016)
- Max Steel (2016)
- Miss Stevens (2016)
- Moonlight (2016)
- The Land (2016)
- As You Are (2016)
- Good Kids (2016)
- Fallen (2016)
- Before I Fall (2017)
- Blame (2017)
- Bring It On: Worldwide Cheersmack (2017)
- Burning Sands (2017)
- Class Rank (2017)
- Coin Heist (2017)
- Deidra & Laney Rob a Train (2017)
- Descendants 2 (2017)
- Dirty Dancing (2017)
- Everything, Everything (2017)
- Fist Fight (2017)
- Hot Summer Nights (2017)
- Midnight Sun (2017)
- Modern Life Is Rubbish (2017)
- Power Rangers (2017)
- Sleight (2017)
- SPF-18 (2017)
- Super Dark Times (2017)
- The Outcasts (2017)
- The Space Between Us (2017)
- You Get Me (2017)
- F the Prom (2017)
- Lady Bird (2017)
- Call Me by Your Name (2017)
- Blockers (2018)
- Candy Jar (2018)
- When We First Met (2018)
- Dude (2018)
- Everyday (2018)
- First Match (2018)
- Love, Simon (2018)
- Eighth Grade (2018)
- Alex Strangelove (2018)
- The Hate U Give (2018)
- Mid90s (2018)
- Never Goin' Back (2018)
- To All the Boys I've Loved Before (2018)
- Reality High (2018)
- The Princess Switch (2018)
- The Kissing Booth (2018)
- Skate Kitchen (2018)
- Sierra Burgess Is a Loser (2018)
- Status Update (2018)
- Step Sisters (2018)
- After (2019)
- Back of the Net (2019)
- Beats (2019)
- Blue Story (2019)
- Five Feet Apart (2019)
- Hala (2019)
- Knives and Skin (2019)
- Nancy Drew and the Hidden Staircase (2019)
- Selah and the Spades (2019)
- Saving Zoë (2019)
- The Perfect Date (2019)
- Summer Night (2019)
- The Last Summer (2019)
- Descendants 3 (2019)
- Booksmart (2019)
- Dora and the Lost City of Gold (2019)
- Waves (2019)
- Let It Snow (2019)
- Student of the Year 2 (2019)
- Tall Girl (2019)
- The Cat and the Moon (2019)
- The Sun Is Also a Star (2019)

==== 2020s ====
- After We Collided (2020)
- American Pie Presents: Girls' Rules (2020)
- All the Bright Places (2020)
- To All the Boys: P.S. I Still Love You (2020)
- Banana Split (2020)
- Chemical Hearts (2020)
- Clouds (2020)
- CODA (2021)
- Coma (2022)
- Crush (2022)
- Stargirl (2020)
- Feel the Beat (2020)
- Life in a Year (2020)
- The Half of It (2020)
- The Kissing Booth 2 (2020)
- This Is the Year (2020)
- Premature (2020)
- Rocks (2020)
- Run Hide Fight (2020)
- Selah and the Spades (2020)
- Spontaneous (2020)
- The Way Back (2020)
- Unpregnant (2020)
- Words on Bathroom Walls (2020)
- Work It (2020)
- Yes, God, Yes (2020)
- A Week Away (2021)
- After We Fell (2021)
- Belfast (2021)
- Boogie (2021)
- Confessions of an Invisible Girl (2021)
- The Exchange (2021)
- The Fallout (2021)
- First Date (2021)
- He's All That (2021)
- The Kissing Booth 3 (2021)
- Licorice Pizza (2021)
- The Map of Tiny Perfect Things (2021)
- Moxie (2021)
- Plan B (2021)
- Ron's Gone Wrong (2021)
- Runt (2021)
- Time Is Up (2021)
- To All the Boys: Always and Forever (2021)
- The Ultimate Playlist of Noise (2021)
- After Ever Happy (2022)
- Along for the Ride (2022)
- Darby and the Dead (2022)
- Do Revenge (2022)
- Hollywood Stargirl (2022)
- Honor Society (2022)
- Hello, Goodbye, and Everything in Between (2022)
- Jane (2022)
- Mr. Harrigan's Phone (2022)
- Metal Lords (2022)
- On the Come Up (2022)
- Senior Year (2022)
- Sex Appeal (2022)
- Supercool (2021)
- Tall Girl 2 (2022)
- The In Between (2022)
- The Sky Is Everywhere (2022)
- Three Months (2022)
- Through My Window (2022)
- After Everything (2023)
- Bottoms (2023)
- Egghead & Twinkie (2023)
- Missing (2023)
- No Hard Feelings (2023)
- Please Don't Destroy: The Treasure of Foggy Mountain (2023)
- Ruby Gillman, Teenage Kraken (2023)
- Saltburn (2023)
- Shooting Stars (2023)
- You Are So Not Invited to My Bat Mitzvah (2023)
- Dìdi (2024)
- Don't Tell the Babysitter's Dead (2024)
- My Old Ass (2024)
- Rez Ball (2024)
- Turtles All the Way Down (2024)
- Freakier Friday (2025)
- Regretting You (2025)
- La Gradiva (2026)
- Pizza Movie (2026)

== See also ==
- Teen drama – List of teen dramas
- Teen magazine – List of teen magazines
- Teen pop
- Teen sitcom – List of teen sitcoms
