= Scream Queen Hot Tub Party =

- VHS cover art
- Directed by: Jim Wynorski (as "Arch Stanton"); Fred Olen Ray (as "Bill Carson")
- Written by: Jim Wynorski; Fred Olen Ray
- Produced by: Jim Wynorski; Fred Olen Ray
- Release date: 1991
- Country: United States
- Language: English

Scream Queen Hot Tub Party, known in the United Kingdom as Hollywood Scream Queen Hot Tub Party, is a 1991 American black comedy horror film directed by Jim Wynorski and Fred Olen Ray. The film stars actual scream queens Brinke Stevens and Michelle Bauer, along with Kelli Maroney.

== Plot ==
Five "scream queens" gather and exchange about their profession while having a hot bath...

== Cast ==
- Brinke Stevens as Herself
- Monique Gabrielle as Herself
- Kelli Maroney as Herself
- Michelle Bauer as Herself
- Roxanne Kernohan as Herself

== Production ==
Ray says the film was shot in one day:

Back in the day, sometimes you wanted to own something. All you did was work for other people, then you'd sit back and watch thousands of units move out and you never got a piece of it. You kept thinking the only difference between you and these guys was you couldn't afford to make a production. At that time, we were dating some of these girls. That's how they became partners in the show. I shot it in my house and we did it very cheaply, but it turned out to be quite successful. We never licensed it. We ran into somebody who had some kind of a connection at a magazine, and they were buying the VHSes and selling them through some ad in a magazine. It came to thousands and thousands of units. We never ever had to license that thing out to anybody. We did a license in the UK but in the United States, we shipped the VHSes ourselves and we never went through another company and it did very well. It was just a little nothing ... Roger Corman and everybody gave us permission to use a certain amount of minutes from films we had made for them, so we were able to pad it all out.

== Reception ==
A brief review in TV Guide said, "Prepare to scream and soak at the same time as a collection of clips from such slasher flicks as Sorority House Massacre 2, Tower of Terror, Slumber Party Massacre, and Hollywood Chainsaw Hookers are all combined into one brand-new fright fest that doesn't skimp on the skin. " A retrospective review at the time of the release of a DVD version stated bluntly, "There isn't much to review here. Do you like to see women naked? Do you like seeing clips from old films? Do you like films that don't overstay their welcome? This is the perfect film for you. There is plenty of nudity and the run time is short." This assessment is shared by various reviewers and commentators, including one who comments, "From a critical standpoint there’s really not a lot to say about Scream Queen Hot Tub Party. The title pretty much says it all. There are Scream Queens. They get into a hot tub. And they proceed to party."
