= Lunk =

A lunk, short for lunkhead, is a pejorative for a fool or idiot.

Lunk can also refer to:

In reality

- An arenavirus (LNKV).
- Lunk, a nickname for Steve Lundquist an Olympic swimmer
- A lunk alarm when Planet Fitness gymgoers make too much noise.
- Lunk, a breed of guinea pigs developed in Sweden.

In fiction

- Jim "Lunk" Austin, a character in Robotech.
- Lunk, an evil alien in PlayStation Move Heroes.
- Big Lunk, a role of played by Jody McCrea in Pajama Party.
- Lunk, an enemy in Bulletman.
- Lunk, a Frosticon in Mixels.
- Jim "Lunk" Austin, a maintenance mechanic in Genesis Climber MOSPEADA.
- Lunk Johnson, alias for Lenny Juliano in Cheerleader Massacre.
- Lunk, a role played by John DiMaggio in Generator Rex.
- Sgt. Lunk played by Noel Cravat in The 5,000 Fingers of Dr. T.
- Lunk, a character in Ribbit King.
- Lunk, a character in "Two of A Kind" episode in Catscratch.
- 'Lunk' Boxwell played by Mike Mazurki in He's a Cockeyed Wonder.
- Grubber (Lunk) voiced by Peter New in Powerpuff Girls Z
- Lunk Nelson, played by Christian Rub in Father's Son
- Lunk played by Enzo Junior in Preaching to the Perverted.
- Lunk voiced by Nolan North in Teenage Mutant Ninja Turtles (2012 TV series).
- Lunk, a Silversnow Knight in The Secrets of Droon.
- The Incredible Lunk, an episode of The Kwicky Koala Show.
- Wieb Lunk played by Brian Regan in episode "Spread Those Wings and Fly" of The Looney Tunes Show.
- Lunk, a character in Space Brat
- Lunk Johnson playing Buzzy in Massacre (franchise).
- Parson Calverton Lunk played by Spencer Charters in In Person.
- Felix Lunk played by Brooklyn Keller in The Fires of Conscience.
- Thing (Marvel Comics), also known as the Lunk, in normalman
- Hans Lünk played by Fritz Genschow in Street Music (1936 film).
- "Lunk's Awakening", an episode of The Cyanide & Happiness Show.
- Lunk, a character in Doglands.

== See also ==
- Lunkhead, a Japanese band
- List of DC Comics characters#Lunkhead, a DC comics character
