= Robin Stille =

American actress (1961–1996)

Robin Rochelle Stille
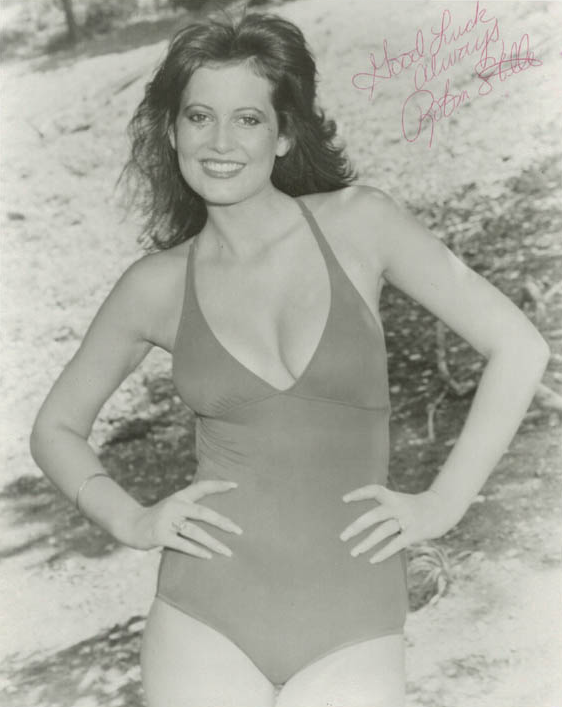
- Born: Robin Rochelle Stille; November 24, 1961; Philadelphia, Pennsylvania, U.S.
- Died: February 9, 1996 (aged 34); Burbank, California, U.S.
- Resting place: Rose Hills Memorial Park
- Other name: Robin Rochelle
- Occupation: Actress
- Years active: 1982–1996

Robin Rochelle Stille (November 24, 1961 – February 9, 1996) was an American actress best known for her roles in the 1982 slasher film The Slumber Party Massacre as final girl Valerie Bates and in the 1988 horror comedy Sorority Babes in the Slimeball Bowl-O-Rama as "Babs". She was sometimes credited as Robin Rochelle.

== Life and career ==
Stille was born in Philadelphia, Pennsylvania and eventually found her way to Hollywood after moving with her family as a child. After starring in The Slumber Party Massacre, she went on to star in the film Sorority Babes in the Slimeball Bowl-O-Rama as Babs Peterson. Some of her other roles include the 1987 films Vampire Nights and Winners Take All, as well as in an episode of Jake and the Fatman, and in the 1991 film American Ninja 4: The Annihilation.

Roles eventually became hard to come by for Stille, which, in addition to her drinking, reportedly led to her suicide in Burbank, California on February 9, 1996, at the age of 34. She was buried at Rose Hills Memorial Park in Whittier, California.

In the early 1980s Stille was a gift consultant for a chain of pet stores.

== Filmography ==
=== Film ===
Year	Film	Role	Notes
1982	The Slumber Party Massacre	Valerie Bates	
1983	The Being	Girl At Drive-In Theatre	Uncredited
1983	I'm Going to Be Famous	Actress On Stage	
1987	Winners Take All	Party Girl #3	
1987	Hungry for Your Love	Airline Passenger	Short
1988	Sorority Babes in the Slimeball Bowl-O-Rama	Barbara "Babs" Peterson	Credited as Robin Rochelle
1988	Vampire Knights	Tasar	Credited as Robin Rochelle
1990	Hard to Die	Sorority Girl	Archive Footage
1990	Sorority House Massacre II	Hockstatter's Neighbor	Archive Footage
1991	American Ninja 4: The Annihilation	Dr. Sarah	

=== Television ===
Year	Show	Role	Notes
1990	Jake and the Fatman	Coat Check Girl	1 Episode, God Bless the Child
1994	Joe Bob's Drive-In Theatre	Barbara "Babs" Peterson	1 Episode, Archive Footage
