= Sorority House Massacre II =

1990 film by Jim Wynorski

- Directed by: Jim Wynorski
- Written by: James B. Rogers; Bob Sheridan
- Produced by: Julie Corman (as "Shelley Stoker"); Jonathan Winfrey (co producer)
- Starring: Gail Harris; Melissa Moore; Dana Bentley; Mike Elliot; Stacia Zhivago; Barbii; Bridget Carney
- Cinematography: J.E. Bash; Jurgen Baum
- Edited by: Nina S. Eisenstein
- Music by: Chuck Cirino
- Distributed by: Concorde Pictures; New Horizon Home Video
- Release date: October 5, 1990
- Running time: 77 minutes
- Country: United States
- Language: English

Sorority House Massacre II (also known as Sorority House Massacre II: Nighty Nightmare) is a 1990 American slasher film directed by Jim Wynorski, featuring scream queens Melissa Ann Moore and Gail Harris (credited as Robyn Harris). It follows five sorority sisters who are stalked and murdered by an unknown assailant after purchasing a large house. Much like its predecessors, Sorority House Massacre II has received a cult following over the years.

It is a loose sequel to Sorority House Massacre, as well as Slumber Party Massacre, from which it recycles some footage. It was followed by Sorority House Massacre III: Hard to Die, which was a remake based on the same script as the second film.

== Plot ==
Five women, Linda, Jessica, Kimberly, Suzanne, and Janey, buy a new sorority house. They get it cheap because of the bloody incidents that took place five years earlier, committed by a murderer known as Hockstatter. They decide to stay in it for the night so they can meet the movers in the morning. Janey tells the group of the murders, putting them on edge. As it turns to night, a storm rolls in, and the girls meet their creepy new neighbor, Orville Ketchum, who recalls the night of the murders and how Hockstatter was defeated. He gives them the basement key before returning home. The girls decide to explore the basement and find Hockstatter's tools and a ouija board. Meanwhile, Lt. Mike Block and Sgt. Phyliss Shawlee set out to get to the Hockstatter house after they receive a disturbance call.

After showering, the group decides to use the Ouija board to contact Hockstatter. However, after the planchette mysteriously flies into the fireplace, they become too scared and go to bed. After Suzanne and Janey have an argument, Janey returns downstairs to drink the rest of the alcohol. However, she is attacked and killed with a hook by an unknown assailant.

Soon after, Suzanne goes downstairs to find Janey. She alerts the others of Janey's disappearance, and the group splits up to search. Suzanne goes up to the attic and accidentally stands on a bear trap before the killer slashes her to death. Meanwhile, Mike and Phyliss travel to a strip club to talk to Candy, a survivor of the Hockstatter massacre. Mike suspects Orville was involved in the crimes, but Candy cannot recall.

Linda, Jessica, and Kimberly go down to the basement to find the two missing girls. Just as they are about to give up, they find their bodies strung up on the ceiling. The girls run upstairs and arm themselves with knives before attempting to leave. They run into Orville and retreat back into the house. As they become more panicked, they realize they left the attic window open. They run upstairs to lock the window. As Kimberly sees wet footprints, she realizes that he has already gotten into the house and flees. Jessica goes after Kimberly, but Linda stays. Kimberly bumps into Orville and hides in a bathroom, but the killer gets in and murders her.

While Linda hides in the attic, Orville enters. She manages to stab him numerous times before choking him. She starts her way downstairs, but is attacked again by a still-alive Orville. She overpowers and drowns him in the toilet. She goes downstairs, and the phone rings. A woman asks for her husband, Hockstatter, then warns her that he is in the house and hangs up. Linda is lured into the basement by Jessica, who reveals herself to be the killer and has been possessed by Hockstatter. Jessica chases Linda upstairs, where the two fight before Orville reveals that he is still alive. Orville stabs Jessica, but she knocks him out before Linda manages to defeat Jessica, stabbing her in the neck.

The next morning, Mike arrives with police officers after the movers found the bodies. They find Linda still alive, but now possessed by Hockstatter. Orville wakes up and shoots Linda dead before the police officers shoot Orville. He, however, survives and is rushed to a hospital and later released after police could not pin the murders on him.

== Cast ==
- Gail Harris as Linda
- Melissa Moore as Jessica
- Stacia Zhivago as Kimberly
- Barbii as Suzanne
- Dana Bentley as Janey
- Jürgen Baum as Lieutenant Mike Block
- Toni Naples as Sergeant Phyllis Shawlee
- Mike Elliott as Eddie
- Bridget Carney as Candy
- Peter Spellos as Orville Ketchum
- Michael Villella as Hockstatter

== Production ==
=== Early draft ===
An early draft of the film was written by Mark Thomas McGee. McGee had written a book about Roger Corman and told Corman he wanted to write a film for him. Corman paid him to write Sorority House Massacre II, assigning Beverly Gray to work with him. McGee later said that Gray:

Was more of a critic than a collaborator. She’d tell me what she didn’t like, which was just about everything, but she never told me what she would like in its place. She spoke in generalities. Never specifics. My third draft was no closer to pleasing her than the first one had been. So when she asked for another rewrite I came to the conclusion that I would be writing Sorority House Massacre II for the rest of my life. Not knowing what else to do I called Roger to voice my concerns. I said that I was willing to do another draft but I needed more guidance than Beverly seemed willing to give me. He said that I had met my contractual obligation and sent me a check for my trouble. That script... was never produced.

=== Jim Wynorski ===
Roger Corman and his wife Julie were going away to Europe for a week. Jim Wynorski, who had made a number of films for the two, went to Julie with the idea of making a slasher film on the sets of Slumber Party Massacre 2 and Rock and Roll High School Forever which were both scheduled to be dismantled. Julie Corman put a hold on striking the sets and told Wynorski to make the film while they were gone without telling Roger.

Wynorski says: "I wrote the script in four days, cast it in two and started shooting the moment they left town. Roger only got wind of it after they returned".

The film was originally titled Jim Wynorski’s House of Babes then Nightie Nightmares but was ultimately called Sorority House Massacre 2. Wynorski had never seen the original.

The film was made in seven days. Wynorski says: "I was adding humor whenever possible and making sure there was plenty of nudity along the way. At first, the script ended when the cops arrived in the morning and found the Gail Harris character alive and holding the knife. I said to hell with that and continued on, bringing Orville back to life one more time to take care of business".

== Sequels ==
The film was followed by Sorority House Massacre III: Hard to Die in 1990, which used the same script slightly altered, seeing the return of the same creative team and several actors and actresses as different characters.

A fourth Sorority House Massacre film began production in 2001 and wrapped principal photography in February 2002. The film had changed the name to Final Exam in August. The film was scheduled for release in 2007 on DVD under another new title The Legacy, but Roger Corman's Concorde Pictures closed up shop and the film was never released. In March 2015, Jim Wynorski released a poster for the film on his official Facebook page with the title Sorority House Massacre: The Final Exam. As of December 2022, it is unknown as to whether or not the film will ever be released. Sam Phillips, who portrayed a fictionalised version of herself in the film, reprised her role in Cheerleader Massacre, a direct sequel to The Slumber Party Massacre.
