= Barely Legal (magazine) =

Pornographic magazine

- First issue, Sept. 1993
- Editor: Larry Flynt
- Categories: Pornographic men's
- Frequency: 13 / year
- Circulation: under 500,000
- First issue: September 1993
- Company: Larry Flynt Publications
- Country: US
- Based in: Los Angeles
- Language: English
- Website: www.barelylegal.com
- ISSN: 0149-4635

Barely Legal is an adult magazine targeted primarily at heterosexual men.

== Overview ==
The magazine features explicit photos of naked young women, all of whom are reportedly just over 18 years old. The models are selected and photographed to emphasize their youth. The pictorials do not feature simulated or hardcore sex with men; models either appear by themselves or in groups of two or more women. In each issue, one of the models is singled out as the "Barely Legal Teen Queen of the Month," whose pictorial includes the centerfold.

Each pictorial is accompanied by what purports to be a profile of or interview with the model, although a disclaimer in the fine print of each issue's indicia clearly states that this text is fiction and likely has little to no basis in reality. These profiles tend to pander to the readers' fantasies by portraying the models as somewhat naive and sexually inexperienced, but curious and eager to start satisfying their sexual appetites, especially with the older men who make up the main demographic of the magazine, now that they have reached the age of consent. In addition to the pictorials, most issues feature a letters column with responses (attributed to the models) to readers' comments about the magazine, a few reviews of "legal teen"-themed adult videos, and a sexually explicit short story written in the first person from the point of view of an 18-year-old woman, usually describing her experience of some sort of sexual awakening.

== Creation ==
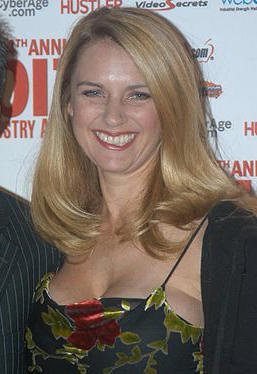
Gail Harris, creator of Barely Legal, at the 2005 XBIZ Awards

In 1988, Gail Harris, founder and CEO of Falcon Foto created, developed and produced from conception the first niche magazine, Barely Legal, for Larry Flynt Publications; it became one of Flynt's best-selling titles, second only to Hustler Magazine. The first issue of Barely Legal, the "Premiere Issue", was released in September 1993.

The launch of Barely Legal revolutionized the porn industry with at least 22 copycat titles appearing, as well as format changes in established publications and in the video medium.

Barely Legal is published 13 times per year by Larry Flynt Publications, and is sometimes marketed as Hustler Barely Legal. Hustler Video also produces a Barely Legal line of videos. Less frequently, LFP publishes Barely Legal Hardcore magazine, which depicts young women engaging in hardcore sex.

Gail Harris was featured as a centerfold model and on the front cover of the March 1986 issue of Hustler.
