= Sorority House Massacre =

1986 film

- Theatrical release poster
- Directed by: Carol Frank
- Written by: Carol Frank
- Produced by: Ron Diamond
- Starring: Angela O'Neill; Wendy Martel; Pamela Ross; Nicole Rio
- Cinematography: Marc Reshovsky
- Edited by: Jeff Wishengrad
- Music by: Michael Wetherwax
- Distributed by: Concorde Pictures
- Release date: October 10, 1986 (Pittsburgh)
- Running time: 74 minutes
- Country: United States
- Language: English

Sorority House Massacre is a 1986 American slasher film written and directed by Carol Frank, and starring Angela O'Neill, Wendy Martel, Pamela Ross, and Nicole Rio. It follows a sorority pledge who experiences déjà vu in the sorority house when a murderer begins killing the residents over Memorial Day weekend. It is the first film in the Sorority House Massacre trilogy, a spin-off of The Slumber Party Massacre trilogy and second film trilogy in Massacre franchise; like its predecessor, it was entirely written and directed by a woman.

The film was developed by Roger Corman's New Concorde Studios based on the prior commercial success of The Slumber Party Massacre (1982), and Frank, who had worked as a personal assistant to that film's director, was hired to write and direct the project. Shot in Los Angeles, Sorority House Massacre had its world premiere in Pittsburgh, Pennsylvania on October 10, 1986. It received a largely negative reception on release, often criticized for being "too similar" to Halloween (1978), while it has been retrospectively praised for its characters and feminist themes and went on to acquire a cult following.

It was followed by two sequels, Sorority House Massacre II and Sorority House Massacre III: Hard to Die (both 1990), directed by Jim Wynorski.

== Plot ==
When Beth was a little girl, her brother Bobby killed her whole family and attempted to kill her. He was caught and committed, and she grew up with a new family.

Years later, Beth goes to college, where she joins a sorority. Due to a memory lapse, she does not remember that the sorority house was her childhood home, but her memory soon returns. Meanwhile, Bobby senses her presence in the house and escapes the mental asylum to finish the job he couldn't complete. He steals a hunting knife in a hardware shop before killing the elderly owner.

As Beth settles into the sorority, many of the girls leave for the weekend, leaving only her, Linda, Sara, and Tracy in the house. As the girls enjoy having the house to themselves, Craig, Andy, and John come over. John tells the story of Beth's family murders, scaring her. She goes to bed and has a nightmare about her brother, becoming more scared. She remembers her brother hiding a knife in the fireplace, and when the group investigates, they find the knife. Realizing the time, Andy leaves in a rush, only to be confronted by Bobby and stabbed to death. Linda hypnotizes Beth, who recalls Bobby attacking her. Afterward, Tracy and Craig go outside to the tipi they set up earlier, while Linda and Sara go to bed. Bobby attacks Tracy and Craig, shredding the tipi with his knife. As they try to escape, Tracy is stabbed to death. Craig runs into the house and alerts Linda and Sara, who try to phone the police but find the lines have been cut. They attempt to warn Beth and John, but both have fallen asleep. As Bobby approaches them, Beth wakes and runs upstairs to the others, but John is murdered.

The survivors barricade themselves inside a room, before Craig escapes out the window down a safety ladder. While he holds it steady for Linda to climb down, Bobby stabs Craig to death before climbing up the ladder for Linda. Linda manages to get back through the window, and the others remove the ladder, causing Bobby to fall. Thinking he is dead, the girls try to escape the house, but upon discovering he is still alive, barricade themselves back into the room. However, Bobby comes in through the window, and they flee outside. They once more encounter Bobby, who manages to repeatedly stab Sara. Meanwhile, Bobby's search party realizes he will have gone to his old house and sends the police there.

Beth and Linda run down into the basement, where Beth finally realizes what happened to her when she was younger. When Bobby attacks them again, the girls run upstairs. Bobby corners Beth, but Linda manages to hit him with a shovel. Thinking he is dead, they begin to leave the house, but Bobby stabs Linda before attacking Beth, who overpowers him and stabs him in the neck, killing him. The police arrive. Beth is taken to the hospital, where she continues to have nightmares about her brother.

== Cast ==
- Angela O'Neill as Laura 'Beth' Henkel
- Wendy Martel as Linda Dawn Grant
- Pamela Ross as Sara Mason
- Nicole Rio as Tracy
- John C. Russell as Bobby Henkel
- Marcus Vaughter as Andy
- Vinnie Bilancio as John Raden Minor
- Joe Nassi as Craig
- Ivory Berry as Suzanne 'Susie'
- Mary Anne as Mrs. Lawrence
- Susan Bollman as Cindy
- Gillian Frank as Dr. Lindsey
- Joseph Mansier as Technician
- Axel Roberts as Larry Bronkowski
- Fitzhough Huston as Detective Gilbert
- Patrick Fahey as Officer Kreuger
- Bob Moore as Officer Voorhees

== Production ==
The film was directed by Carol Frank, and financed by Roger Corman's New Concorde studio based on the success of The Slumber Party Massacre (1982), on which Frank had served as director Amy Holden Jones's personal assistant.

== Release ==
The film was given a limited theatrical release in the United States by Concorde Pictures, having its world premiere in Pittsburgh on October 10, 1986. It later screened in Los Angeles in March 1987.

In the United Kingdom, the film was approved by the British Board of Film Classification in an extended cut running approximately 86 minutes in length.

=== Home media ===
The film was released on VHS on April 15, 1987, by Warner Home Video.

The film has been released twice on DVD in the United States by New Concorde Home Entertainment; once as a single film edition in 2000 and as a double feature release alongside sequel Sorority House Massacre II in 2003.

The film was remastered and released on Blu-ray in a limited 1,200 copy run through Scorpion Releasing in November 2014. On April 20, 2023, Scream Factory released a new special edition Blu-ray scanned from the original camera negative, which was limited to 1,500 units and made available through their online store. Along with the bonus materials contained on the Scorpion release, the disc also features newly commissioned interviews, as well as a video master-quality extended cut of the film that was originally released exclusively in the United Kingdom. Scream Factory announced via their official Facebook page that the Blu-ray edition was approximately 75% sold on April 25, after which it fully sold out the following day.

On April 8, 2025, Scream Factory reissued the film in a collector's edition 4K UHD and Blu-ray set.

== Reception ==
At the time of its release, the film drew numerous comparisons to John Carpenter's Halloween (1978).

In a retrospective review, Lee Gambin of ComingSoon.net praised the film for its characters, adding: "Frank is a smart filmmaker who builds upon the mapped-out murders by marrying them with a rich character design for each of Beth’s friends who cop it, and that is why the film succeeds in being a “dead teenager movie” with teenagers to care about and value."

Writer Jason Paul Collum notes in his book Assault of the Killer B's: Interviews with 20 Cult Film Actresses (2015) that the film visually features more in common with such films as Black Christmas (1974) and A Nightmare on Elm Street (1984), calling it "artistically directed" by Frank.

On the internet review aggregator Rotten Tomatoes, the film holds a 0% approval rating as of April 2023, based on five critical reviews.

== Legacy ==
In the years since its release, Sorority House Massacre has acquired a cult following and been praised for its cinematography and feminist themes.

In November 2020, Norman Reedus announced that he was developing a television series adaptation of the film in conjunction with Shout! Studios.

== Sources ==
- Armstrong, Kent Byron (2003). Slasher Films: An International Filmography, 1960 Through 2001. Jefferson, North Carolina: McFarland. ISBN 978-0-786-41462-8.
- Collum, Jason Paul (2015). Assault of the Killer B's: Interviews with 20 Cult Film Actresses. Jefferson, North Carolina: McFarland. ISBN 978-0-786-48041-8.
- Young, R. G. (2000). The Encyclopedia of Fantastic Film: Ali Baba to Zombies. New York City, New York: Applause Books. ISBN 978-1-557-83269-6.
