= The Zero Boys =

- Theatrical release poster
- Directed by: Nico Mastorakis
- Written by: Nico Mastorakis
- Produced by: Nico Mastorakis
- Starring: Daniel Hirsch; Kelli Maroney; Nicole Rio; Tom Shell
- Cinematography: Steven Shaw
- Edited by: George Rosenburg
- Music by: Stanley Myers; Hans Zimmer
- Production company: Omega Entertainment
- Distributed by: Splendid Film
- Release dates: July 26, 1986 (UK); December 17, 1986 (US)
- Running time: 89 min.
- Country: United States
- Language: English

The Zero Boys is a 1986 American action slasher film, written, produced and directed by Nico Mastorakis. It stars Daniel Hirsch, Kelli Maroney, Nicole Rio, Tom Shell and Joe Estevez. The film follows a group of paintballers on vacation at a remote wooded cabin, who encounter with a duo of serial killers.

Though the film had a theatrical release in some overseas territories, it was released direct-to-video in the United States, on December 17, 1986. It notably features one of the earliest film scores written by composer Hans Zimmer, in collaboration with Stanley Myers.

== Plot ==
Steve, Larry, and Rip are part of a paintball team known as "The Zero Boys". Fresh from a tournament win, the trio and their girlfriends take a leisure trip into the mountains, they stumble upon a gruesome massacre. Blood-chilling screams lead the group to a deserted cabin, where they gradually discover the horrors of the killings and the evil causing it. Now the Zero Boys, armed with real weapons of their own, must do what comes best: destroy the enemy.

== Cast ==
- Daniel Hirsch as Steve
- Kelli Maroney as Jamie
- Nicole Rio as Sue
- Tom Shell as Larry
- Jared Moses as "Rip"
- Crystal Carson as Trish
- Joe Estevez, Gary Jochimsen and Elise Turner as The Killers
- Stephen Kay as Soldier
- John Michaels as Casey
- Harry Donenfeld as Snake Man
- Trudy Adams as Secretary
- Steven Shaw as Coach

== Music ==
The Zero Boys is notable for featuring one of the earliest film scores written by Hans Zimmer, in collaboration with his mentor Stanley Myers. At the time, the two had recently founded the Lillie Yard recording studio in London, and worked mainly on independent and lower-budget films. The Zero Boys would be the first of four B-movies Zimmer and Myers scored for director Nico Mastorakis and studio Omega Entertainment, all produced between 1986 and 1987.

In 2021, the complete score was released on CD by Notefornote Music in a limited, 1,000-copy edition.

== Home media ==
The film was released on DVD by Simitar Video in 2000. It was subsequently re-released by Image Entertainment in 2003 and by Arrow Films on Blu-ray/DVD on April 26, 2016.
