= Michael Villella =

American film and television actor (1940–2024)

- Villella in The Slumber Party Massacre, 1982
- Born: April 8, 1940
- Died: November 23, 2024 (aged 84)
- Occupations: Film and television actor

Michael Villella (April 8, 1940 – November 23, 2024) was an American film and television actor. He was best known for playing the power drill-wielding serial killer Russ Thorn in the 1982 film The Slumber Party Massacre.

Villella died on November 23, 2024, at the age of 84.

== Partial filmography ==
- The Slumber Party Massacre (1982) – Russ Thorn
- Love Letters (1984) – Oliver's Client
- Gotham (1988) – Cop
- Wild Orchid (1989) – Elliot Costa
- Wild Orchid II: Two Shades of Blue (1991) – Man with Mona
