= Heidi Kozak =

Danish actress

- Born: Heidi Karin Kozak; June 22, 1963 (age 62); Copenhagen, Denmark
- Occupation: Actress
- Years active: 1987–2014
- Website: heidikozak.com

Heidi Karin Kozak (born June 22, 1963) is a Danish actress. She appeared in several late-1980s horror films, including Slumber Party Massacre II (1987), Friday the 13th Part VII: The New Blood (1988), and Society (1989). She appears in the behind-the-scenes documentary Sleepless Nights: Revisiting the Slumber Party Massacres. In the first season of Dr. Quinn, Medicine Woman, she had the supporting role of Emily Donovan. She left the series after becoming pregnant and choosing to focus on motherhood.

== Filmography ==
=== Film ===
Year	Film	Role	Notes
1987	Slumber Party Massacre II	Sally Burns	
1987	Cold Steel	Gang Girl	
1988	Friday the 13th Part VII: The New Blood	Sandra Casey	
1989	Society	Shauna	

=== Television ===
Year	Series	Role	Notes
1986	Child's Cry	Receptionist	Television film
1986	ABC Weekend Specials	The Maid	2 episodes; "The Mouse and the Motorcycle"
1987	Growing Pains	Bonnie	Episode: "Thank God It's Friday"
1987	Silver Spoons	Bonnie	Episode: "Educating Rick"
1987	The Twilight Zone	Adrienne	Episode: "Joy Ride"
1987	Jake and the Fatman	Lana	Episode: "Fatal Attraction"
1988	Matlock	Alice Wierman	Episode: "The Hucksters"
1989	Mama's Family	Terri Gebhardt	Episode: "Hate Thy Neighbor"
1993	Dr. Quinn, Medicine Woman	Emily Donovan	10 episodes
2003	Recipe for Disaster	Real Estate Agent	Television film
2014	Discord and Harmony	Deb	Episode: "You Think You Know Someone"
