= Melissa Moore (actress) =

American B-movie actress

- Occupations: Actress, model, horse trainer
- Years active: 1987–present

Melissa Moore is an American actress, model and horse trainer who starred in a number of B movies in the late 1980s to the mid-1990s.

== Personal life ==
Moore is the daughter of horse trainers Tom and Donna Moore. In 1996 she gave up full time acting and modeling and returned to her hometown in Kentucky to rejoin her family in American Saddlebred horse training.

== Filmography ==
Year	Title	Role	Notes
1987	Evil Spawn	Monica Roarke	a.k.a. Alien Within, Alive by Night, Deadly Sting and Metamorphosis (Australia)
1988	Bluegrass		TV movie, uncredited
1989	Scream Dream	Jamie Summers	
1989	Samurai Cop	Peggy	
1989	Caged Fury	Gloria	
1990	Vampire Cop	Melanie Roberts	
1990	Sorority House Massacre 2	Jessica	a.k.a. Night Frenzy and Nighty Nightmare
1990	The Invisible Maniac	Bunny	a.k.a. The Invisible Sex Maniac (US)
1990	Hard to Die	Tess	a.k.a. Sorority House Massacre 3 (US) & Tower of Terror
1990	Fatal Skies	Suzy	
1990	Repossessed	Bimbo Student	
1990	Vice Academy Part 2	Glaze	
1991	The Killing Zone	Tracy	a.k.a. Encuentro final (US)
1991	Shock Cinema Vol. 2	Herself	
1991	Scream Queen Hot Tub Party		Archive footage, uncredited
1992	Soulmates	Laura	a.k.a. Blood Love (UK) & Evil Lives (US)
1992	Mad at the Moon	Miss Saunders	
1992	Into the Sun	Female Sergeant	
1992	The Other Woman	Elysse	
1992	Consenting Adults	Trudy Seaton	
1992	Scream Queens Swimsuit Sensations	Herself	
1992	Invasion of the Scream Queens	Herself	
1992	Playboy: Sexy Lingerie IV	Herself	
1993	Savage Vengeance	Singer at bar	a.k.a. I Will Dance on Your Grave: Savage Vengeance (US)
1993	Da Vinci’s War	Fred	
1993	Angelfist	Lorda	
1994	The Feminine Touch	Tall Blonde	a.k.a. November Conspiracy
1994	One Man Army	Natalie Pierce	a.k.a. Kick & Fury
1994	Joe Bob's Drive-In Theater Episode #1	Herself	
1995	Stormswept	Dottie	
1995	Friendship’s Field	Jane	
1995	Compelling Evidence	Stephanie Roberts	
1995	Bikini Drive-In		Uncredited
1996	Face of Evil	Grad Student Tour Guide	TV movie
1996	A Loss of Innocence	Esther Bowen-Dorius	TV movie, a.k.a. The End of Eden (Australia)
1998	The Dark Side of Hollywood	Herself	
2000	Mortality	Melissa Moore II	
2003	Hellborn	Nurse Ryan	a.k.a. Asylum of the Damned (US)
2015	Samurai Cop 2: Deadly Vengeance	Peggy	
2016	Enter the Samurai	Herself	Documentary on the creation of Samurai Cop 2: Deadly Vengeance
2022	Puppet Master: Doktor Death	Gladys	
2024	A Country Music Christmas	Ginny Remington	
