= Slumber Party Massacre II =

1987 film

- Theatrical release poster
- Directed by: Deborah Brock
- Written by: Deborah Brock
- Produced by: Roger Corman; Deborah Brock; Don Daniel
- Starring: Crystal Bernard
- Cinematography: Thomas L. Callaway
- Edited by: William Flicker
- Music by: Richard Cox
- Distributed by: New Concorde
- Release date: October 16, 1987
- Running time: 75 minutes
- Country: United States
- Language: English
- Budget: $500,000
- Box office: $1.3 million

Slumber Party Massacre II is a 1987 American slasher film written and directed by Deborah Brock, and produced by Roger Corman. It is the second installment in the original Slumber Party Massacre trilogy, and stars Crystal Bernard, with Atanas Ilitch making his screen debut as the Driller Killer. Produced on a budget of $500,000 by Corman's New Concorde Pictures, principal photography began in June 1987 in Los Angeles under the working title Don't Let Go. The film follows Courtney, a character introduced in the previous film, as she and her friends are attacked by a supernatural killer with a power-drill guitar.

Slumber Party Massacre II grossed $1.3 million at the box office on a budget of $500,000. Despite largely negative reception, the film has attracted a small cult following among fans of the slasher genre.

A sequel, Slumber Party Massacre III, was released in 1990.

== Plot ==
Courtney Bates, who survived the events of the first film, is now a senior in high school. She invites her crush, Matt, to stay at a condominium with her and her friends, Amy, Sheila, and Sally, for her birthday weekend. Upon arriving, two of the girls' boyfriends, Jeff and T.J., show up at the house. That night, Courtney has a dream of the killer from the first film, who is now reincarnated as a greaser and armed with a drill bit guitar, and awakens on the kitchen floor. That day, her visions grow violent, but she is comforted when Matt arrives. Sally disappears, and the group is unable to find her, but she later returns to the house, having gone to the store.

Courtney and Matt are left alone. Matt surprises Courtney with a birthday cake, and the two begin to have sex. The killer suddenly appears and impales Matt through the chest before chasing Courtney downstairs, where he confronts the group, who have just returned. As the others escape, the killer impales Sally with the drill. Sheila and T.J. flee, while Courtney, Amy, and Jeff leave in Jeff's car. Jeff is impaled by the killer, and Courtney and Amy flee back to the house. Sheila and T.J. run to a nearby house for help, but the killer catches up to them and T.J. is killed. Sheila manages to return to the condominium before the killer murders her as well. Courtney and Amy escape, but the killer pursues them through a construction site, where Amy falls to her death. Courtney uses an oxyacetylene torch to light the killer on fire, finally killing him.

Sometime later, Courtney wakes up next to Matt, but he morphs into the killer. She then awakens inside a psychiatric ward and screams frantically as a drill bursts through the floor and the credits roll.

== Cast ==
- Crystal Bernard as Courtney Bates
- Kimberly McArthur as Amy
- Juliette Cummins as Sheila Barrington
- Patrick Lowe as Matt Arbicost
- Heidi Kozak as Sally Burns
- Joel Hoffman as T.J.
- Scott Westmoreland as Jeff
- Jennifer Rhodes as Mrs. Bates
- Cindy Eilbacher as Valerie Bates
- Michael Delano as Officer Kreuger
- Hamilton Mitchell as Officer Voorhies
- Atanas Ilitch as The Driller Killer

== Production ==
Filming of Slumber Party Massacre II took place in Los Angeles, California in June 1987 under the working title Don't Let Go. The budget was approximately $500,000.

== Release ==
=== Box office ===
The film was given a limited release theatrically in the United States by New Concorde on October 16, 1987, and grossed $1.3 million at the box office on a budget of $500,000.

=== Home media ===
It was subsequently released on VHS by Nelson Entertainment. The film has been released on DVD three times. The first release came from New Concorde Home Entertainment in September 2000. Extras included actor bios along with trailers for Slumber Party Massacre, Slumber Party Massacre II and Sorority House Massacre II. The company re-released the film on a double feature DVD alongside the original The Slumber Party Massacre in July 2003. These versions are both currently out of print. Shout! Factory released Slumber Party Massacre, Slumber Party Massacre II and Slumber Party Massacre III on a two-disc special edition DVD set in October 2010. A full-length documentary, Sleepless Nights: Revisiting the Slumber Party Massacres (2010), directed by Jason Paul Collum, accompanied the set. It has since been released on Blu-ray in a double feature with Slumber Party Massacre III.

The Shout! Factory release includes an extended, unrated version of the film, never before seen on home video. It was pieced together using three different sources by editor/director Dustin Ferguson.

== Reception ==
Leonard Klady of the LA Times compared the film's supernatural elements to A Nightmare on Elm Street (1984), adding: "Writer-director Deborah Brock simply fails to give her film style or wit. The grisly shenanigans are as inane and illogical as the rationale behind making this effort". TV Guide awarded the film 2/4 stars, noting that it follows in the "vaguely feminist tradition" of the first film, adding: "The rockabilly killer is probably the most entertaining slasher ever to grace the screen—sort of like Elvis Presley playing Norman Bates, complete with musical numbers".

In The Gorehound's Guide to Splatter Films of the 1980s, Scott Aaron Stine writes: "You can't get much more of an insufferable viewing experience than this slasher flick-cum-musical".
