= Peter Spellos =

American voice actor (1954–2023)

- Born: Peter Alexander Spellos; March 1, 1954
- Died: November 19, 2023 (aged 69)
- Occupation: Voice actor
- Years active: 1990–2023

Peter Alexander Spellos (March 1, 1954 – November 19, 2023) was an American voice actor. Spellos appeared in hundreds of films and television shows. He died from pancreatic cancer in Indianapolis, Indiana on November 19, 2023, at the age of 69.

== Notable roles ==
=== Animated Television Series ===
- BattleTech: The Animated Series – Captain Miles Hawkins
- Bureau of Alien Detectors – Moose Trengganu

=== Anime ===
- Black Jack – Mr. Brane
- Bleach – Koganehiko, Dordonii Alessandro del Socaccio
- Code Geass – Bartley Asprius
- Cowboy Bebop – Dr. Baucus (Episode 15)
- Digimon: Digital Monsters – Meramon, Whamon, Additional Voices
- Eagle Riders – Cyberon
- El-Hazard – Londs
- Ghost in the Shell: Stand Alone Complex – Niimi
- Gurren Lagann – Beastman (episode 13)
- Kikaider – Zadam
- Naruto – Hitode
- Outlaw Star – Gilliam
- Rave Master – Billy
- S-CRY-ed – Dred
- The Big O – Additional Voices
- Transformers: Robots in Disguise – Sky-Byte
- Trigun – Monev The Gale
- Wolf's Rain – Bartender

=== Live action ===
- American Dreams – Gus
- The Guyver – Ramsey
- ER – Trib Reporter
- Married... with Children – Elmo
- NewsRadio – Camera Man
- Lois and Clark: The New Adventures of Superman – Elroy Sykes

=== Movie roles ===
- Attack of the 60 Foot Centerfold – Vic Stryker
- Billy Frankenstein – Bloodstone
- Sexual Roulette – Stan
- Bound – Lou
- Cowboy Bebop: The Movie – Duvchenko, Queen
- Digimon: Island of the Lost Digimon – Grizzlymon
- Dinosaur Island – Turbo
- Panda! Go, Panda! – Ringmaster
- Glass Trap – Howard Brunel
- Hard to Die – Orville Ketchum
- Men in Black II – Captain Larry Bridgewater
- Possessed by the Night – Big Ed
- Agent Red – Colonel Korsky
- Sorority House Massacre II – Orville Ketchum
- In the Army Now – Mr. Quinn
- Yes Man – Security Guard (Hollywood Bowl)

=== Video games ===
- Seven Samurai 20XX – Rojie
