= Ribbit King =

- Developers: Infinity; Jamsworks
- Publisher: Bandai
- Artist: Yosuke Kihara
- Composer: Yūsuke Takahama
- Platforms: GameCube, PlayStation 2
- Release: GameCube: JP: 11 July 2003; NA: 8 June 2004; PAL: 3 September 2004; PlayStation 2: JP: 18 December 2003; NA: 8 June 2004; PAL: 3 September 2004
- Genre: Sports
- Modes: Single-player, multiplayer

Ribbit King is a 2003 sports video game developed by Infinity and Jamsworks and published by Bandai for the GameCube and PlayStation 2. The game is based on the fictional sport of Frolf (ケロフ), which is a golf-like game that is played with frogs. The frogs sit on catapults, which the player whacks with a hammer to send the frog flying into the air. It is the successor to Kero Kero King, released only in Japan in 2000 for the PlayStation.

== Gameplay ==
Players compete on five Frolf courses, each of which features four holes. The objective of the game is to earn the most points possible through a combination of landing the frog in the course's hole in the fewest strokes as well as having the frog engage with various stage elements, such as spheres that contain certain point amounts, flies that the frogs can swallow, and various events that require player input (such as a well-timed button press or fast control stick movements) to earn points. The player can also equip up to five power-ups, which they can expend during a match to give their frogs additional advantages, such as the power to swim through lava or an increase to the range in which they can eat a fly. Different frogs can also be unlocked for use, each of which has different properties. New frogs and power-ups can be purchased from defeated opponents or randomly from a gumball machine in the game's central hub. Defeating an opponent in the story unlocks them for use in the game's multiplayer mode; up to 11 playable characters can be unlocked, plus one additional character exclusive to each console. Additionally, the game features an achievement system in the form of special bottlecaps, which can be unlocked in an in-game gallery by completing specific objectives.

North American versions of Ribbit King come packaged with a bonus disc called Ribbit King Plus!, which is an assortment of 28 short CGI films about Scooter and his friends. These shorts are unlocked through progression in the main game.

The main character of Ribbit King is a young carpenter named Scooter. Scooter is trying to become the Frolf Champion—or the namesake 'Ribbit King'—and in doing so win the 'Super Ribbinite', a fuel source his planet needs in order to survive. Accompanying Scooter is Pickwick, a sentient picnic basket who acts his caddy and coach, while Frolf referee Sluggy oversees each of his matches. Scooter must face multiple opponents in the Frolf tournament, such as kung fu panda Pan-Pan, robotic penguin Sir Waddlelot, and video game playing ghosts Sparky and Whoosh.

== Ribbit King Plus! ==
Ribbit King Plus! is the bonus disc included with North American versions of the game, featuring unlockable short animations and requiring saved data on the memory card to be able to view the shorts. It was initially transmitted in Japan as a 30-episode series of shorts on the TV Tokyo weekday morning children's show Oha Suta from 16 June to 25 July 2003 to promote the game, under the title Kero Kero King DX Plus (ケロケロキング デラックス プラス), before being released on a separate DVD at around the same time as the Japanese PlayStation 2 version of the game; however, three of the shorts were dropped from the North American version for unknown reasons. Exclusive to the disc is a two-minute video titled "Special", a montage of the various cutscenes from the story mode set to the main title theme of the game.

=== Episodes ===
No.	Title	Original release date
1	"Frolf Intensive Training" "Kerofu Chō Tokkun" (ケロフ超特訓)	16 June 2003
2	"Ribbit King Band" "Za★Kerokin Bando" (ザ★ケロキンバンド)	17 June 2003
3	"Confession" "Kokuhaku" (告白)	18 June 2003
4	"Ribbit King Shopping" "Kerokin Shopin'" (ケロキンShopin')	19 June 2003
5	"Gone Fishing" "Fisshingu" (フィッシング)	20 June 2003
6	"Sluggy After Work" "Nurupon Afutā 5" (ぬるぽんアフター5)	23 June 2003
7	"Frolf Dance" "Kerofu Dansu" (ケロフダンス)	24 June 2003
8	"Fun with Hammers" "Akashiro Hanmā" (赤白ハンマー)	25 June 2003
9	"Ribbit King Shopping Part 2" "Kerokin Shopin'(2)" (ケロキンShopin'(2))	26 June 2003
10	"Frolf Beach Party!" "Samābīchi・Dandi" (サマービーチ・ダンディ)	27 June 2003
11	"Fast Food Surprise" (Note: Not included in Ribbit King Plus!) "Yatai Nite" (屋台にて)	30 June 2003
12	"Ribbit King Band Part 2" "Za★Kerokin Bando (2)" (ザ★ケロキンバンド(2))	1 July 2003
13	"Ultra Seed Grow" "Sodate! Tame!" (育て! タネ!)	2 July 2003
14	"The Secret of Sir Waddlelot" "Penginrobo no Himitsu" (ペンギンロボの秘密)	3 July 2003
15	"Princess Tippi's Siesta" "Tipi-hime no Siesuta" (ダルひめのシエスタ)	4 July 2003
16	"Frolf-Man to the Rescue" "Henshin! Kerofuman!" (変身! ケロフマン!)	7 July 2003
17	"Frog Work-Out!" "Kaeru Taisō!" (カエル体操!)	8 July 2003
18	"Frog Revolution!" "Kaeru Kaigi" (カエル会議)	9 July 2003
19	"Frolf Hip-Hop!" "Kerokin Ondo!" (ケロキン音頭!)	10 July 2003
20	"Ribbit King Shopping Part 3" "Kerokin Shopin'(3)" (ケロキンShopin'(3))	11 July 2003
21	"The Great King" "Idainaru Ōsama" (偉大なる王様)	14 July 2003
22	"TV Commercial" "Komāsharu" (コマーシャル)	15 July 2003
23	"The Frogs Strike Back" "Kaeru no Gyakushū" (カエルの逆襲)	16 July 2003
24	"Chomp's Big Date" "Ōguchi no Dēto" (オオグチのデート)	17 July 2003
25	"When We Were Kids" "Chicchai Koro" (ちっちゃい頃)	18 July 2003
26	"Fast Food Surprise Part 2" "Yatai Nite (2)" (屋台にて(2))	21 July 2003
27	"Ribbit King Band Live" "Za★Kerokin Raibu" (ザ★ケロキンライブ)	22 July 2003
28	"Fly Meeting" "Hae Kaigi" (ハエ会議)	23 July 2003
29	"Scooter Gets Serious" "Tsuki ni Chikaeba" (月にちかえば)	24 July 2003
30	"Farewell, Frolf Tour" "Tsuā Uchiage Party!" (ツアー打上げParty!)	25 July 2003

== Kero Kero King ==
Kero Kero King
- Developer: Amedio
- Publisher: Media Factory
- Artist: Yosuke Kihara
- Platform: PlayStation
- Release: JP: 10 December 2000
- Genre: Sports
- Modes: Single-player, multiplayer

Kero Kero King (ケロケロキング) is the predecessor to Ribbit King, developed by Amedio and published by Media Factory. It was released exclusively in Japan on December 10, 2000 for the PlayStation. All of the unique art in the game and in the many FMVs featured inside the game are done by Japanese illustrator Yosuke Kihara.

The gameplay follows a very similar formula as its sequel, as it is a golf based game but uses a frog instead of the ball, allowing you to tweak the direction and height of the frog while also collecting points throughout the courses. The frog is also able to jump off spider webs and jump to flies, adding variance to the gameplay. There are a total of 10 courses in the game, with each game taking 10 rounds to complete; the person with the highest score wins.

The story of Kero Kero King is summarized on its front cover as follows: ""Kerof" is the brand new exciting sports in the galaxy. The champion of the kerof is called "kerokeroking". But Nosukin, a little boy, is about to challenge him!!" The story also has Nosukin meeting many unique characters in games of kerof, which you can unlock and use in versus mode.

== Reception ==
Reception

Aggregate scores
Aggregator	Score
GameRankings	(PS2) 63.64% (GC) 63.07%
Metacritic	(GC) 60/100 (PS2) 58/100

Review scores
Publication	Score
Game Informer	7/10
GameSpot	5.9/10
GamesTM	6/10
IGN	5/10
NGC Magazine	45%
Nintendo Power	3.6/5
Official U.S. PlayStation Magazine	3/5
PlayStation: The Official Magazine	5/10
PSM3	22%
X-Play	3/5

The game received mixed reviews upon release. Aggregating review websites GameRankings and Metacritic gave the GameCube version 63.07% and 60/100 and the PlayStation 2 version 63.64% and 58/100. Former GameSpot journalist Ryan Davis gave the PlayStation 2 version 5.9 out of 10, saying that it focused more on the bizarre storyline than the gameplay, while Mary Jane Irwin of IGN gave the GameCube and the PlayStation 2 versions a score of five out of ten.

In Japan, Famitsu gave Kero Kero King a score of 30 out of 40.
