= Karen Mayo-Chandler =

British actress and model

- Born: 18 April 1958; Sutton, Surrey, U.K.
- Died: 11 July 2006 (aged 48); Long Beach, California, U.S.
- Other names: Lindsay Taylor, Karen Mayo
- Occupations: Actress, model

Karen Mayo-Chandler (18 April 1958 – 11 July 2006) was a British actress and model. She appeared in issues of Vogue and Harper's Bazaar magazines. After minor television and theatre appearances in the United Kingdom, she relocated to Los Angeles in 1982, and made her American television debut with a guest role on Bring 'Em Back Alive. She made sporadic appearances on television and in films, mostly in the exploitation and horror genres.

In the December 1989 issue of Playboy, she was featured in a nude photo layout and recounted her former relationship with actor Jack Nicholson.

Mayo-Chandler was diagnosed with breast cancer in 2005. She died of the disease on July 11, 2006, in Long Beach, California, at the age of 48.

== Selected filmography ==
- 1980 Strangers as Lucy Degas (1 episode)
- 1982 Bring 'Em Back Alive (1 episode)
- 1984 Down on Us as Sue Rigg
- 1984 Beverly Hills Cop as Maitland Receptionist
- 1985 Explorers as Starkiller's Girlfriend
- 1986 Hamburger: The Motion Picture as Dr. Gotbottom
- 1986 Nightmare Weekend as Sue (as Karen Mayo)
- 1988 Party Line as 'Sugar Lips'
- 1989 Africa Express
- 1989 Out of the Dark as Barbara
- 1990 Hard to Die as Diana (as Lindsay Taylor)
- 1992 976-EVIL 2: The Astral Factor as Laurie
- 1995 Columbo: Strange Bedfellows as Tiffany Keene
- 1997 Dark Planet as Alpha Female
- 1997 'Til There Was You as Awful Truth Woman
- 1997 Prince Valiant (as Karen Mayo Chandler)
