= The Slumber Party Massacre =

1982 film by Amy Jones

- Theatrical release poster
- Directed by: Amy Jones
- Written by: Rita Mae Brown
- Produced by: Amy Jones
- Starring: Michele Michaels; Robin Stille; Michael Villella; Andree Honore
- Cinematography: Steve Posey
- Edited by: Sean Foley
- Music by: Ralph Jones
- Production company: Santa Fe Productions
- Distributed by: New World Pictures
- Release dates: September 10, 1982 (Los Angeles); November 12, 1982 (New York City)
- Running time: 76 minutes
- Country: United States
- Language: English
- Budget: $220,000
- Box office: $3.6 million

The Slumber Party Massacre (also known as The Slumber Party Murders in the United Kingdom) is a 1982 American slasher film produced and directed by Amy Jones and written by Rita Mae Brown. It is the first installment in the Slumber Party Massacre series, and stars Michelle Michaels, Robin Stille, Michael Villella, and Andree Honore. The film follows a high school senior who gathers her friends for a slumber party, unaware that an escaped power drill-wielding killer is loose in the neighborhood.

The film was originally written by Brown as a parody of the slasher genre but was shot as a straightforward horror film instead. As a result, it contains more humor, both intended and unintended, than usual for the genre at the time.

The Slumber Party Massacre grossed $3.6 million at the box office on a budget of $220,000, and received mixed reviews from critics. Despite the reception, it has obtained a large cult following since its release. Two direct sequels, Slumber Party Massacre II and Slumber Party Massacre III, followed in 1987 and 1990, respectively, with a fourth film following in 2021. Two spin-off film series forming a wider Massacre franchise were also produced: the Sorority House Massacre trilogy (1986–1990), and the Cheerleader Massacre films (2003–2011), the first film of the latter series having been filmed as Slumber Party Massacre 4 before being renamed.

== Plot ==
In Venice, Los Angeles, Trish Deveraux, an 18-year-old high school senior, decides to throw a slumber party while her parents are away for the weekend, inviting her friends Kim, Jackie, and Diane. Trish's parents enlist their next-door neighbor, David Contant, to keep an eye on the girls. Trish throws away a bag of childhood toys, and shortly after she leaves for school, someone steals a doll from the garbage can. In the school parking lot, escaped serial killer Russ Thorn kills a telephone repairwoman in the back of her van. After basketball practice, Trish invites a new student, Valerie Bates, to the party, but Valerie declines, having overheard Diane's rude comments about her.

After school, one of their classmates, Linda, goes back into the school to retrieve a textbook from her locker, but gets locked inside. Russ ambushes and kills Linda using a power drill. As the party begins that night, the girls use marijuana and alcohol, while Valerie babysits her younger sister, Courtney, across the street. Two boys from school, Jeff and Neil, lurk outside Trish's house and spy on the girls while they change into their pajamas. Russ kills Mr. Contant outside with his power drill. When Trish finds her doll covered in blood and pinned to the side of the house with a cleaver, she and Diane go to check if the garage door is unlocked, unaware that Russ is hiding in the shadows.

When the electricity suddenly cuts out, the four girls go to the garage to check the fuse box and find Jeff and Neil hiding there. After the boys admit that they had removed some of the fuses as a prank, the girls bring them inside. Diane is visited by her boyfriend John, and as they make out in his car in the garage, he suggests going over to his house. Diane goes inside and tells Trish that she is leaving with John, but upon returning to the car, she finds John's decapitated body before Russ kills her. Courtney hears Diane's screams and becomes concerned.

While Kim is on the phone with Coach Rachel Jana, the girls answer the door and find the pizza delivery man with his eyeballs gouged out. Trish calls the police, but Russ cuts the telephone line. Having heard the girls' screams, Coach Jana calls Valerie, asking her to check on them, and decides to drive over to Trish's house. Jeff and Neil run out to seek help, but both boys are killed. Russ gains entry to the house and murders Jackie. Trish and Kim barricade themselves in Trish's bedroom, but Russ sneaks in through a window behind them and kills Kim while Trish hides in her parents' closet.

Valerie and Courtney enter the house to find Kim's body in the refrigerator and hide from Russ. Coach Jana arrives, and as she fends Russ off with a fire poker, Trish appears and stabs him with a knife before he disembowels Coach Jana with the drill. Valerie chases Russ outside with a machete, eventually severing his hand before slicing his abdomen. Russ falls into the swimming pool and sinks beneath the water, only to re-emerge moments later and attack them again, but Valerie finally kills him with the machete. Trish and Valerie break down in tears as Courtney looks on in shock.

== Cast ==
- Michelle Michaels (credited as Michele Michaels) as Trish Devereaux
- Robin Stille as Valerie Bates
- Michael Villella as Russ Thorn
- Debra Deliso as Kim Clarke
- Andree Honore as Jackie Cassidy
- Gina Mari as Diane
- Jennifer Meyers as Courtney Bates
- Joseph Alan Johnson (credited as Joe Johnson) as Neil
- David Millbern as Jeff
- Jim Boyce as John Raden Minor
- Pamela Roylance as Coach Rachel Jana
- Brinke Stevens as Linda Dawn Grant
- Rigg Kennedy (credited as Ryan Kennedy) as David Contant
- Jean Vargas as Mary, the telephone repairwoman
- Anna Patton as Mrs. Annette Devereaux
- Howard Purgason as Mr. Devereaux

== Production ==
=== Conception ===
Author and feminist activist Rita Mae Brown wrote the original screenplay, titled Sleepless Nights, as a parody of the slasher film. Producers repurposed Brown's script to make a "serious" slasher film against her wishes.

Amy Holden Jones, a film editor, wanted to direct and asked Frances Doel for advice. Doel gave Jones a number of scripts. Jones chose the script that would become The Slumber Party Massacre, then going by the title of Don't Open the Door, and decided to film the first three scenes. Her husband, cinematographer Michael Chapman, acquired equipment and film and hired actors from the University of California, Los Angeles, and they shot the scenes at their house over a weekend for $1,000. She showed the result to Roger Corman, who agreed to finance the film. Jones had to turn down a job editing Steven Spielberg's E.T. (1982) as a result. The soundtrack was composed on a Casio MT-40.

=== Filming ===
Filming began in the summer of 1981. The film was shot on location in Los Angeles, California, mainly in Venice.

== Release ==
=== Box office ===
Distributed by New World Pictures, the film premiered in Los Angeles on September 10, 1982, and was given a limited release in New York City on November 12. It grossed $3.6 million at the box office on an estimated budget of $220,000.

=== Critical response ===
The Slumber Party Massacre received mixed reviews from critics. Janet Maslin of The New York Times wrote of the film: "The Slumber Party Massacre is just the usual cavalcade of corpses, all of them dispatched by a maniac who wields a power drill. At the end of the movie, a woman who has miraculously survived the carnage breaks his drill in half. That's feminism for you, and symbolism too". Time Out gave the film a middling review, noting: "Despite the unlikely script credit for Rita Mae Brown, Jones's debut feature is little more than a Halloween clone, reliant on buckets of blood and sudden surprise rather than suspense." David Hinckley of the New York Daily News awarded the film 1.5 stars out of 4, noting that the performances are "uneven" and "the special effects are not special".

Variety's published review, however, praised the film: "Besides its obviously catchy title, Slumber Party Massacre is an entertaining terror thriller, with the switch that distaff filmmakers handle the 'young women in jeopardy' format." Dave Kehr of the Chicago Reader also gave the film a positive review, noting its even pacing and direction by Jones. Leonard Klady of the Los Angeles Times also noted the film's pacing, writing in a retrospective that the film boasted a "darkly humorous vision and a breathtaking pace".

Dale Schneck of The Morning Call deemed the film a "rousing thriller" that "delivers as many vicarious thrills as one could want from this sort of cinematic mayhem".

On the review aggregator website Rotten Tomatoes, 48% of 25 critics' reviews are positive, with an average rating of 4.9/10. Metacritic, which uses a weighted average, assigned the film a score of 51 out of 100, based on 8 critics, indicating "mixed or average" reviews. Despite the critical reception, the film has a large cult following among slasher fans.

=== Home media ===
It was released on VHS and Betamax by Embassy Home Entertainment in 1983.

The film has been released on DVD three times in North America. The first release came from New Concorde Home Entertainment in September 2000. The company subsequently re-released the film on a double feature DVD alongside Slumber Party Massacre II in July 2003. Both these versions are out of print. Shout! Factory released all three films in the series on a two-disc special edition DVD set in October 2010. It contained the full-length documentary Sleepless Nights: Revisiting the Slumber Party Massacres, reuniting cast and crew of the original trilogy and directed by Jason Paul Collum.

Shout! Factory, under their subsidiary label Scream Factory, released The Slumber Party Massacre on Blu-ray on March 18, 2014. The company later re-released the film on Blu-ray in a limited edition steelbook with new extras in January 2020, followed by a double-feature set on 4K UHD Blu-ray alongside Slumber Party Massacre II on February 21, 2023.

In the United Kingdom, the British Board of Film Classification (BBFC) re-titled the film The Slumber Party Murders, as the word "massacre" was felt to be too suggestive. In the UK, it has had two releases on DVD, with both editions containing no special features.

== Sequels ==
There have been two sequels to the film, Slumber Party Massacre II (1987) and Slumber Party Massacre III (1990). Jason Paul Collum directed the documentary Sleepless Nights: Revisiting the Slumber Party Massacres (2010). Other films in the Massacre film series includes a second trilogy: Sorority House Massacre (1986), Sorority House Massacre II: Nighty Nightmare (1990), and Sorority House Massacre III: Hard to Die (1990), and a third series: Cheerleader Massacre (2003) and Cheerleader Massacre 2 (2011), the former filmed as Slumber Party Massacre 4 before being renamed during post-production.

=== Re-imagining ===
Shout! Studios produced a stand-alone sequel/re-imagining of the film, with director Danishka Esterhazy and written by Suzanne Keilly.

The film premiered on Syfy on October 16, 2021.

== See also ==
- The Massacre Collection
- The Incredible Melting Man, another horror film written as a parody but filmed as a straightforward effort

== Sources ==
- Harper, Jim (2004). Legacy of Blood: A Comprehensive Guide to Slasher Movies. Critical Vision. ISBN 978-1-900-48639-2.
- Muir, John Kenneth (2012). Horror Films of the 1980s. Vol. 1. McFarland. ISBN 978-0-786-47298-7.
- Nashawaty, Chris (2013). Crab Monsters, Teenage Cavemen and Candy Stripe Nurses: Roger Corman: King of the B Movie. Harry N. Abarms. ISBN 978-1-419-70669-1.
- Shary, Timothy (2014). Generation Multiplex: The Image of Youth in American Cinema Since 1980. University of Texas Press. ISBN 978-0-292-75662-5.
