= Kelli Maroney =

American actress

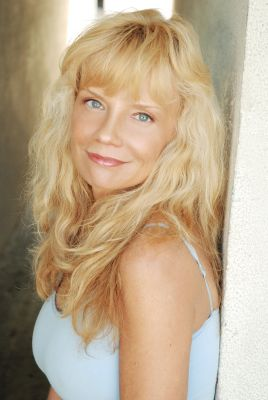
- Maroney in 2019
- Occupation: Actress
- Years active: 1979–present
- Known for: Fast Times at Ridgemont High; Night of the Comet; Chopping Mall; Ryan's Hope
- Website: www.kellimaroney.com

Kelli Maroney (born December 30, 1965) is an American film and television actress. She appeared in the films Fast Times at Ridgemont High (1982), Night of the Comet (1984), Chopping Mall (1986), The Zero Boys (1986) and Scream Queen Hot Tub Party (1991). Maroney also appeared on television in the soap operas Ryan's Hope and One Life to Live.

== Career ==
Maroney's film roles include cheerleader Cindy Carr in Fast Times at Ridgemont High (1982), Samantha Belmont in Night of the Comet (1984), Allison in Chopping Mall (1986), Jamie in The Zero Boys (1986), and Herself in Scream Queen Hot Tub Party (1991). Her daytime TV roles were as Kimberly Harris Beaulac on the soap opera Ryan's Hope (1979–1983) and Tina Lord on One Life to Live (1984–1985).

== Appearances ==
She has made numerous guest appearances on TV shows, among them True Blood, Family Feud, Simon & Simon, Murder, She Wrote, FBI: The Untold Stories, and Chicago Hope.

She was featured on the cover of People for a 1980 article titled: Torrid Teens on the Soaps (with actresses Genie Francis and Kristen Vigard).

Maroney appeared as a guest on the Playboy TV 2015 "So Sexy It's Scary" Halloween episode with Jeffrey Reddick and Lisa Wilcox.

She was a guest of and interviewed on Illeana Douglas's 2019 podcast "I Blame Dennis Hopper".

== Filmography ==
Film
Year	Title	Role	Notes
1982	Fast Times at Ridgemont High	Cindy Carr	
1983	Slayground	Jolene	
1984	Night of the Comet	Samantha "Sam" Belmont	
1986	Chopping Mall	Alison Parks	
1986	The Zero Boys	Jamie	
1987	Big Bad Mama II	Willie McClatchie	
1988	Not of This Earth	Nurse Oxford	
1989	Jaded	Jennifer	
1989	Transylvania Twist	Hannah	
1990	Hard to Die	Wife	
1991	Servants of Twilight	Sherry Ordway	
1991	Scream Queen Hot Tub Party	Herself	
1993	Midnight Witness	Devon	
1999	Sam and Mike	Co-Producer	Short film
2004	Audition	Brett	Short film
2011	Lip Service	Janice	
2019	In Search of Darkness	Herself	Documentary film
2019	Blowing Up Right Now	Ruth	
2020	Exorcism at 60,000 Feet	Ms. Jenkins	
2020	In Search of Darkness: Part II	Herself	Documentary film
2020	A Well Respected Man	Anita Padgett	Short film
2020	The Deep Ones	Ambrose Zadok	
2022	Staycation	Cynthia Oxford	
2022	Sorority Babes in the Slimeball Bowl-O-Rama 2	Auntie Snake	
TBD	Bridgette Wrona and the Whisper Creek Murders	Marlene Gatlin	

Television
Year	Title	Role	Notes
1979–1981,1982-83	Ryan's Hope	Kimberly Harris	319 episodes
1984	Celebrity	Josie	TV miniseries
1984	One Life to Live	Tina Lord	TV series
1986	Simon & Simon	Angela Fielding	Episode: "Eye of the Beholder"
1986	Murder, She Wrote	Cissy Barnes	Episode: "Menace, Anyone?"
1991	FBI: The Untold Stories	Bonnie Kelly	Episode: "Kill for Love"
1997	The Pretender	Reporter	Episode: "Dragon House: Part 1"
1997	Face Down	Merrie / Meredith	TV movie
1999	Chicago Hope	Grace McNeil	Episode: "Home Is Where the Heartache Is"
2008	True Blood	Televangelist	Episode: "Mine"
2010	Tim and Eric Awesome Show, Great Job!	Kelli	Episode: "Re-Animated"
2012	Gila	Deputy Wilma	Television film
