= Sorority House Massacre III: Hard to Die =

- Hard to Die VHS cover
- Directed by: Jim Wynorski
- Written by: Mark Thomas McGee; James B. Rogers
- Produced by: Jim Wynorski
- Starring: Gail Harris; Melissa Moore; Bridget Carney; Karen Mayo-Chandler; Peter Spellos; Debra Dare
- Cinematography: Jürgen Baum
- Music by: Chuck Cirino
- Production company: Miracle Pictures
- Distributed by: New Horizons Home Video
- Release date: 1990
- Running time: 77 minutes
- Country: United States
- Language: English

Sorority House Massacre III: Hard to Die (also known as Tower of Terror or simply Hard to Die) is a 1990 American slasher film written by Mark Thomas McGee and James B. Rogers, directed by Jim Wynorski, and starring Gail Harris and Melissa Moore. The film features a similar storyline and many of the same actresses from its predecessor, and Wynorski's previous film Sorority House Massacre II, of which Hard to Die is essentially a remake.

The film was released direct-to-video in 1990, but it was released theatrically in 1992 under the name Tower of Terror and received an NC-17 rating. A sequel, titled Sorority House Massacre: The Final Exam, wrapped production in February 2002, but remains an unreleased film to this day.

== Plot ==
A group of women are trapped in a deserted skyscraper, with a crazed killer at their heels.

== Cast ==
- Gail Harris as Linda Dawn Grant (credited as Robyn Harris)
- Karen Mayo-Chandler as Diana (credited as Lindsay Taylor)
- Deborah Dutch as Jackie Cassidy (credited as Debra Dare)
- Melissa Moore as Jessica "Tess"
- Bridget Carney as Candy Shayne
- Toni Naples as Sergeant Phyllis Shawlee (credited as Karen Chorak)
- Jürgen Baum as Lieutenant Mike Block
- Bob Sheridan as Cop In Lobby
- Monique Gabrielle as Fifi Latour (credited as Carolet Girard)
- Peter Spellos as Orville Ketchum
- Don Key as Brad Plympton
- Forrest J Ackerman as Dr. Ed Newton
- James B. Rogers as Messenger (credited as J.B. Rogers)
- Domonic Muir as Larry Bronkowski
- Eric Baum as Agent
- Amelia Sheridan as Helga
- Don Peterson as Husband
- Kelli Maroney as Wife (credited as D. Mason Keener)
- Greg Lauoi as Cameraman
- Cirsten Weldon as Agent's Girlfriend
- Ronald V. Borst as Pedestrian
- Jim Wynorski as Director (uncredited)

== Production ==
Jim Wynorski had made the previous film for Julie Corman, which was called Sorority House Massacre II. Corman's husband Roger wanted Wynorski to remake it, using the same story and cast. Wynorski says: "When Roger Corman saw what I did for his wife in just seven days, he wanted me to do the same for him".

Corman wanted to re-use the sets that had just been used for Corporate Affairs (1990), which consisted of a reception area and a few suites. According to Mark Thomas McGee, who was hired to work on the script:

This change in locale presented Jim and I with a problem—how to get the women out of their clothes and into their underwear. Try to imagine someone like David Lean or William Wyler wrestling with a dilemma like this. Not that women would ever run around in their underwear regardless of the location, but it was a little easier to swallow when they were in a sorority house. I asked Jim if it would be too much of a problem to redress the reception area to make it seem like we're on different levels of a high rise instead of a single level office. Jim liked that idea because it opened up all sorts of possibilities for us. It not only gave the ladies more room to run and hide from the killer, it also meant (and this was the genius of the stroke) that they could discover a lingerie company on another level. The sequence where these ladies become so excited when they discover these frilly and sexy undergarments (and just can't wait to try them on) is as ridiculous and infantile as anything you can imagine. But half-naked women is just about all that a film like this has to offer.

McGee said that he had a week to write a script. He spent five days going in a different direction, but then realised Corman genuinely wanted a true remake, and spent two days redrafting.

Wynorski says with the film: "I took Orville's hardships to even further extremes".

The film is alternatively known as Tower of Terror.

== Unreleased sequel ==
A fourth Sorority House Massacre film began production in 2001 and wrapped principal photography in February 2002. The film had changed the name to Final Exam in August. The film was scheduled for release in 2007 on DVD under another new title The Legacy, but Roger Corman's Concorde Pictures closed up shop and the film was never released. In March 2015, Jim Wynorski released a poster for the film on his official Facebook page with the title Sorority House Massacre: The Final Exam. As of December 2022, it is unknown as to whether or not the film will ever be released. Sam Phillips, who portrayed a fictionalised version of herself in the film, reprised her role in Cheerleader Massacre, a direct sequel to The Slumber Party Massacre.
