= Slumber Party Massacre III =

1990 film

- Theatrical release poster
- Directed by: Sally Mattison
- Written by: Catherine Cyran
- Produced by: Roger Corman; Catherine Cyran
- Starring: Keely Christian; Brittain Frye; M. K. Harris; David Greenlee; Hope Marie Carlton; Maria Ford
- Cinematography: Jürgen Baum
- Edited by: Tim Amyx
- Music by: Jamie Sheriff
- Distributed by: New Concorde
- Release date: September 7, 1990
- Running time: 87 minutes
- Country: United States
- Language: English
- Budget: $350,000
- Box office: $1.2 million (U.S.)

Slumber Party Massacre III (also known as Captive Women in the Philippines) is a 1990 American slasher film directed by Sally Mattison and written by Catherine Cyran. It is the third and final installment in the original Slumber Party Massacre trilogy, and stars Keely Christian, Brittain Frye, M.K. Harris, David Greenlee, Hope Marie Carlton and Maria Ford. The film follows a group of teenage girls in California, whose slumber party is crashed by a deranged killer.

Slumber Party Massacre III grossed $1.2 million at the box office on a budget of $350,000. Much like its predecessors, the film has developed a cult following, but is often considered the worst of the trilogy.

== Plot ==
A group of friends plays volleyball on a beach in Venice. Jackie, one of the group, is a high school senior throwing a slumber party that night, as her parents are out of town looking for a new house. When the friends leave the beach, one of the girls, Sarah, gets into her car and is brutally murdered by an unseen assailant in the backseat with a power drill. Jackie returns home to find her odd neighbor, Morgan, there, wanting to tour the house; he tells her he is considering purchasing the property once she and her family move.

That night, Jackie's friends, Diane, Maria, Juliette, Janine, and Susie, arrive for the party. Shortly after, three boys, Frank, Tom, and Michael, arrive and scare them. Jackie angrily tells the guys to leave. Frank and Tom go get something for the girls while Michael goes to apologize to them. Michael encounters a masked killer, who impales him with a "house for sale" sign post. After another boy, Duncan, bribes a pizza delivery girl into delivering the pizzas to the girls, she is chased and murdered by the same killer. The girls let Frank and Tom in the house, and Ken, Juliette's love interest, appears right behind them.

Upstairs, Juliette and Ken begin to have sex, but Ken is too drunk; he pleasures her orally instead. Ken leaves, and Juliette is electrocuted by an unseen assailant in the bathtub. Soon after, Maria finds Juliette's corpse in a closet. As Ken and Tom run to find help, they stop by a lumberyard to get weapons. Ken, revealing himself as the killer, proceeds to whack Tom with a sledgehammer, before slicing into his legs with a chainsaw. Ken goes to a van parked on the street where he has kept the bodies and a giant power drill. Inside, he examines a newspaper clipping regarding the suicide of his police officer uncle Billy, and recalls how he was sexually abused by him.

Back at the house, Ken barges in and kills both Duncan and Frank. Maria finds Tom's dead body before her, and Janine runs to the door, but Ken follows, and Maria flees. Janine jumps through the glass door, and Ken drills her in the back, killing her. Susie hides in an upstairs closet, but Ken attacks her and knocks her unconscious. Before he can kill her, Maria knocks him in the head with a lamp, and he chases her, Jackie, and Diane into the basement, where Jackie uses a spear gun to shoot him, and they run back upstairs. Susie regains consciousness and throws bleach in Ken's face, blinding him. He catches Maria and kills her as well. Jackie, Susie, and Diane manage to knock Ken unconscious with a mallet.

As the three contemplate what to do, Ken awakens and begins slashing Diane with a knife, killing her. Susie manages to pin Ken to the floor long enough for Jackie to viciously plunge the drill through his chest multiple times. After he dies, Jackie finds a photo in Ken's shirt pocket of him as a child with his uncle. Susie goes to answer the door when the police knock, and the credits roll.

== Cast ==
- Keely Christian as Jackie Cassidy
- Brittain Frye as Ken Whitehouse
- Michael Harris as Morgan (credited as M.K. Harris)
- David Greenlee as Duncan
- Brandi Burkett as Diane
- Hope Marie Carlton as Janine
- Maria Claire as Susie
- Maria Ford as Maria
- Garon Grigsby as Michael Block
- Devon Jenkin as Sarah Mason
- David Kriegel as Tom
- David Lawrence as Frank Barnes
- Lulu Wilson as Juliette
- Alexander Falk as Detective Davis
- Wayne Grace as Officer O'Reilly
- Yan Birch as Weirdo on Beach
- Ron Smith as Uncle Billy
- Marta Kober as the Pizza Girl

== Release ==
The film was given a limited release theatrically in the United States by Concorde Pictures in September 1990. It grossed $1,242,995 at the box office. It was subsequently released on VHS by New Horizons Home Video. In the Philippines, the film was released as Captive Women on January 17, 1992.

The film has been released on DVD two times. The first release came from New Concorde Home Entertainment in September 2000. Extras included actor bios along with trailers for Slumber Party Massacre, Slumber Party Massacre II and Sorority House Massacre II. Shout! Factory released Slumber Party Massacre, Slumber Party Massacre II and Slumber Party Massacre III on a two-disc special edition DVD set in October 2010. In 2018, it was released for the first time on Blu-ray in a double feature alongside Slumber Party Massacre II.

== Reception ==
In a contemporary review, Variety noted that the film "eschews the role-reversal aspects of Amy Jones' superior 1982 original". The review noted the film was poorly scripted, the "gore is plentiful but unimaginative", and that "by the final reel, when five full-bodied females are scurrying helplessly as the man wielding the phallic drill skewers them, even die-hard genre fans will be groaning in dismay".

Review aggregator website Rotten Tomatoes reports that 20% of five critics gave the film a positive review.

== Sources ==
- Prouty, Howard H., ed. (1994). Variety Television Reviews 1923-1992. Garland Publishing Inc. ISBN 0-8240-3796-0.
