= Sam Phillips (model) =

American actress, host, DJ, producer, and model (born 1966)

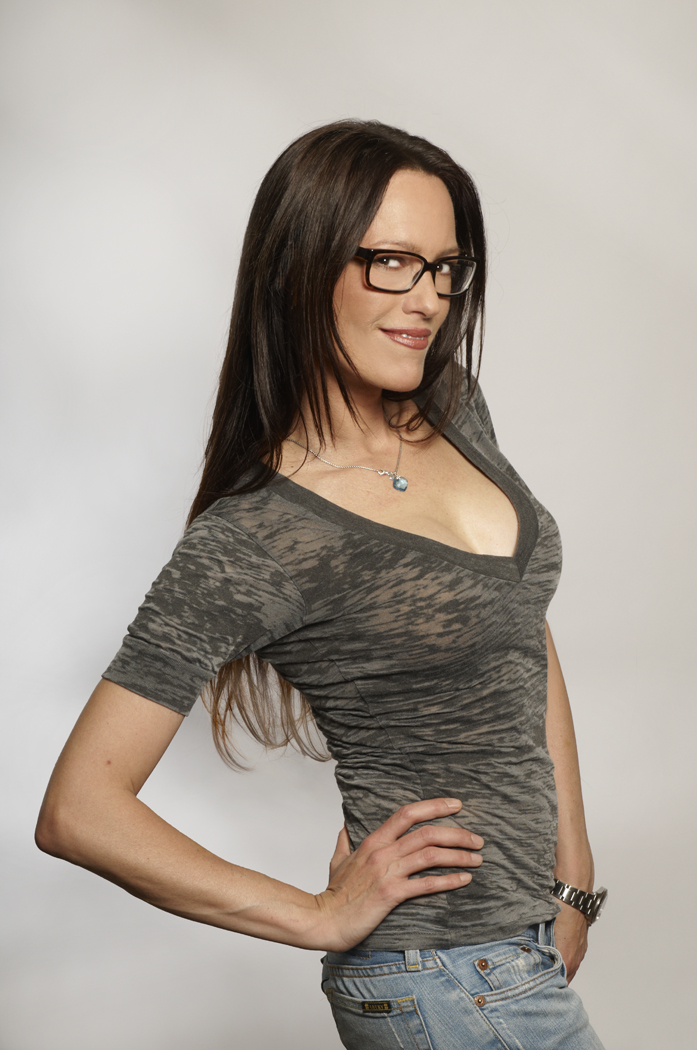
- Phillips in 2009
- Born: Samantha Phillips; February 25, 1966 (age 59); Savage, Maryland, U.S.
- Occupations: Radio DJ, model, actress, producer, talk-show host, TV host
- Height: 5 ft 9 in (1.75 m)
- Website: thesingleliferadioshow.com

Samantha Phillips (born February 25, 1966) is an American actress, talk-show host, reality TV host, radio DJ, producer, and model. She had an early role in the 1988 action-horror film Phantasm II. Currently, she is the host of a radio show called The Single Life.

== Career ==
=== Television and music videos ===
Phillips has appeared on numerous television shows, including CBS' The Late Late Show with Craig Kilborn, FX Network, The Howard Stern Show, The Joan Rivers Show, The Jenny Jones Show, The Maury Povich Show, Hard Copy, Inside Edition, Extra, Entertainment Tonight, Undateable (VH1), The Doctors (CBS), Red Eye (Fox News Channel), Strictly Sex with Dr. Drew (Discovery Health Channel), and HBO. She has also been cast in music videos, including ones for "Weird Al" Yankovic, Van Halen, Amy Grant, Mötley Crüe, Simply Red, Scorpions, The Doobie Brothers, Dave Koz, Iron Maiden and Alice Cooper, among others.

Between 1998 and 2001, Phillips was a reporter for Sexcetera on Playboy TV. In 2005, she hosted episodes of Xtreme Fakeovers. She was also a co-host of the syndicated daytime talk show Men Are from Mars, Women Are from Venus along with Cristina Ferrare, Bo Griffin, Drew Pinsky, and Rondell Sheridan replacing Cybill Shepherd.

=== Modeling ===
Phillips started working at an early age. After dropping out of school in the 10th grade, she started modeling. One of her more notable model castings was for a Jordache Jeans campaign in 1984 for the company's sponsorship of the 1984 Olympics in Los Angeles. Phillips was Penthouse Pet for June 1993.

=== Movies ===
She has appeared in movies such as Love Potion (1987), Deceit (1989), Phantasm II (1988), Angel 4: Undercover (1993), Sexual Malice (1994) and Fallen Angel (1997), Weekend at Bernie's II (1993), Spy Hard (1996) and Rescue Me (1993) and the N.Y. Independent Film Festival award winner, Just for the Time Being (2000) among other films. Phillips is also the producer of the Busty Cops series of movies (Busty Cops 1, Busty Cops 2, Alabama Jones and The Busty Crusade, Busty Cops Protect and Serve), and starred in Showtime's Hot Springs Hotel.

=== Radio (broadcast and internet) ===
In 2001 Phillips hosted Men Are From Mars, Women Are From Venus a national morning talk show. The concept was based on the best-seller by John Gray and set out to explore the innate differences between men and women, in front of a live audience.

Phillips hosted 97.1 The FM Talk Station/KLSX radio talk show "The Single Life," a show about navigating and surviving dating life in Los Angeles, from 2004 to 2009. After 97.1 The FM Talk Station/KLSX switched to a Top 40 format in February 2009, Phillips and her co-host Chris Leary branched out into different media. The Single Life TV show premiered on MavTV in May 2009, focusing on candid talk about sex and dating.

In June 2009, Phillips co-created HotTalkLA.com, an internet radio station, with Jack Sullivan, Ron Escarsega, and Rich Boerner. She is Hot Talk LA's Executive Producer and VP.

=== Writing ===
As of 2010, Phillips blogs for LA Weekly online in their After Dark LA section. Her blog The Single Life focuses on sex, dating and relationship advice. Phillips also blogs for DigN2it online.

== Filmography ==
- Sorority House Massacre: The Final Exam (unreleased) - Sam Phillips
- 2002 Cheerleader Massacre as Officer Phillips
- 2002 Treasure Hunt! as
- 2000 The Regina Pierce Affair as
- 1999 Passion's Obsession as
- 1997 Hot Springs Hotel as
- 1997 Fallen Angel as
- 1997 Moonbase as
- 1994 Angel 4: Undercover as
- 1994 The Dallas Connection as Samantha Maxx
- 1993 Sexual Malice as
- 1993 Weekend at Bernie's II as
- 1992 Rescue Me as Cherrie
- 1989 Deceit as Eve
- 1988 Phantasm II as Alchemy
- 1987 Love Potion as

== Personal life ==
Phillips was born in Savage, Maryland to a half-Russian father and a Scottish-Irish mother. When Phillips was young her family moved to Brooklyn, New York.
