= Cheerleader Massacre =

- DVD release cover
- Directed by: Jim Wynorski
- Written by: Lenny Juliano
- Produced by: Jason Hoffs
- Starring: Tamie Sheffield; Charity Rahmer; Erin Byron
- Cinematography: Chuck Cirino
- Edited by: Dean McKendrick
- Music by: Dan Savio
- Release date: March 25, 2003
- Running time: 85 minutes
- Country: United States
- Language: English
- Budget: $60,000 (estimated)

Cheerleader Massacre is a 2003 American B-movie slasher film directed by Jim Wynorski and written by Lenny Juliano. It is the seventh installment in the Massacre franchise and was originally meant to be a direct sequel to The Slumber Party Massacre (1982).

The film was produced by Roger Corman and lensed by Jim Wynorski. It was released direct-to-video on March 25, 2003, with special features including trailers, actor bios, audio commentaries, and a making of featurette.

== Plot ==
High school students Kelly and Gary are camping out at night, when an unseen assailant stabs Gary to death and impales Kelly with a hiking stick. The next day, the Bridgemont High cheerleading squad (Parker, Angela, Tammy, Shelley, and Dina) practice before leaving for an event in another town. In the locker room, Shelley mourns for their former teammate, Marissa, who died exactly one year ago. As the group is leaving, Dina goes back inside to get her purse and is killed. The others assume she took the bus and leave in a van with their coach, Ms. Hendricks, their driver, Buzzy, and students Mark and Ryan.

Bobcat County Sheriff Frank Murdock and Deputy Donna Adams are notified by the Fresno Police chief that serial killer Jeremiah MacPherson, who escaped from a mental hospital the day before, is thought to be moving in their direction. Meanwhile, a jogger, Debbie, is killed when someone cuts the ropes of the suspension bridge she is crossing. Murdock, Adams, and Officers Kimble and Phillips investigate Kelly and Gary's murder. Murdock and Adams then visit retired sheriff Monty Coltrain, who arrested MacPherson 20 years ago, to warn him of his escape. While there, they learn that Dina has been found gutted at the high school, which doesn't fit MacPherson's MO. When Phillips and Kimble see his jacket by the side of the road and stop to investigate, he ambushes and kills them both and steals their squad car. Murdock and Adams visit one of MacPherson's surviving victims, Linda, hoping her recollection of the attack will yield further clues. In a flashback, he attacks her in the high school with a large power drill and leaves her for dead.

The cheerleaders encounter a roadblock and are told they will have to take a detour, so Buzzy takes a shortcut through a snowy mountain pass. The van runs out of gas as the snowstorm worsens, and the group takes refuge in an empty vacation cabin. The Fresno Police chief's assistant, Melissa DeMarco, calls Sheriff Murdock and informs him that MacPherson called their station with Debbie's cell phone and left a voicemail implying that he is not acting alone. Deputy Adams receives word that the cheerleaders have gone missing, and she and Murdock leave to search for them.

MacPherson arrives at Monty's cabin in the stolen squad car. The two exchange gunfire, and MacPherson flees into the woods. Buzzy goes outside to investigate the gunshots but is distracted when he sees Tammy and Ryan having sex through a bedroom window. The killer sneaks up and kills him with an axe. Mark goes outside to look for Buzzy and is decapitated. The others discover his body and search the cabin for a gun. Ryan finds one, and he and Angela go for help. They become separated, and Ryan is strangled. Ms. Hendricks, Parker, Shelley, and Tammy go outside to look for the fuse box. Shelley finds it and is electrocuted when she touches it. Tammy is pulled into the crawlspace and stabbed repeatedly. Monty comes across Shelley's body while tracking MacPherson, and Ms. Hendricks and Parker ambush him and knock him unconscious, believing he is the killer. Angela shows up and confronts them at gunpoint, revealing that she killed the cheerleading squad to avenge Marissa's death. They manage to elude her, and Parker confesses to Ms. Hendricks that the cheerleaders slipped ecstasy in Marissa's drink at a party and filmed her making out with Angela. She tried to drive home while high and crashed her car over a bridge. They made a pact never to reveal the truth, and they used the video to blackmail Angela into going along with it.

Ms. Hendricks and Parker turn on the gas stove and throw a Molotov cocktail into the cabin as Angela enters it, blowing it up and killing her. The next morning, Deputy Adams talks to them in front of Monty's house as Sheriff Murdock sends Monty off in an ambulance. As it pulls away, the driver is revealed to be MacPherson.

== Cast ==
- Tamie Sheffield as Ms. Hendricks
- Charity Rahmer as Parker Jameson
- Erin Byron as Angela Caruso
- Lenny Juliano (credited as Lunk Johnson) as Buzzy
- Bill Langlois Monroe (credited as E. Eddie Edwards) as Sheriff Murdock
- Samantha Phillips as Officer Phillips. Phillips reprises her role from the unreleased Sorority House Massacre: The Final Exam.
- GiGi Erneta as Deputy Adams
- April Flowers (credited as Diana Espin) as Tammy Rae
- Nikki Fritz as Debbie
- Tylo Tyler as Ryan
- Brad Beck as Mark
- Summer Williams as Shelley
- Brinke Stevens as Linda
- Melissa Brasselle as Detective DeMarco
- Julie Lisandro (credited as Julie Corgill) as Dina
- Regina Banali (credited as Regina Russell) as Buzzy's Flashback Girl

== Production ==
The film was originally shot as Slumber Party Massacre 4 and contained various links to the first film, even having Brinke Stevens reprise her role as Linda Dawn Grant. However, production company New Concorde felt that there had been too many sequels to the Slumber Party series. The title was then changed to Cheerleader Massacre and character names, plus backstories, was altered so the film could become a standalone feature

== Sequel ==
The film was followed by a very loose sequel named Cheerleader Massacre 2 in 2011.
