= This Is How the World Ends (film) =

- Directed by: Robert dos Santos
- Written by: Robert dos Santos
- Produced by: Byron Davis; Suraya Sulliman
- Starring: Josh Kempen; Frances Sholto-Douglas; Sean Cameron Michael
- Edited by: Christopher-Lee Dos Santos
- Music by: Edward George King
- Release date: 2026
- Countries: United States; South Africa
- Language: English

This Is How The World Ends is a 2026 science fiction film directed by Robert dos Santos in his directorial debut, starring Josh Kempen, Frances Sholto-Douglas, and Sean Cameron Michael. The film follows Tom Freeman, played by Kempen, as he rushes against time to bring his sister home from the "last party" on earth, during the middle of a war between humans and machines. The film is being released as the first straight-to-VHS film in 20 years.

== Plot ==
When a war breaks out between humanity and the AI Machine States, the world is thrown into a state of confusion. With some believing that the war will blow over, others believe that these are humanity's final days. Believing that it is the end, Danni Freeman runs away to the last party on earth to enjoy her final moments alive. Learning of this, and believing the government reports that the war is being won, Danni's brother Tom gives chase after his sister to bring her back home against the backdrop of a world slowly descending into chaos.

== Cast ==
- Josh Kempen as Tom Freeman
- Frances Sholto-Douglas as Danni Freeman
- Sean Cameron Michael as Rick "The Broadcaster" Douglas

== Release ==
This Is How The World Ends is being released as the first straight-to-VHS film in approximately 20 years. The filmmakers have stated that the existential threat of AI to the creative industry, aligned with the existential threat of AI in the film, led them to release the film in a way that ran contrary to traditional digital releases seen in modern cinema. dos Santos hopes to also give the film a theatrical release.
