= Christopher-Lee Dos Santos =

South African film director and screenwriter

Christopher-lee dos Santos
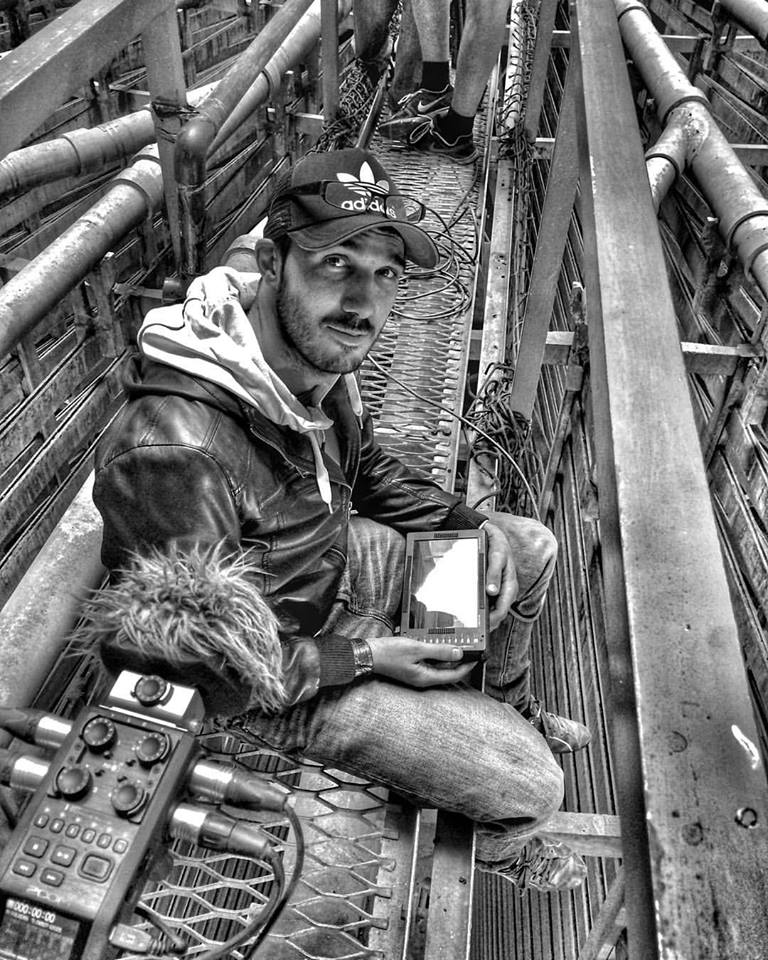
- Dos Santos on the set of Last Broken Darkness
- Born: 2 April 1984 (age 42); South Africa
- Occupation: Film Director
- Years active: 2009–present

Christopher-Lee dos Santos is a South African film director and screenwriter perhaps best known for the 2013 independent film Angel of the Skies.

== Education and early work ==
Dos Santos graduated in Honours from the African Film and Drama Academy (AFDA) in South Africa in 2008, majoring in directing and screenwriting and minoring in psychology and sociology. During his school years, dos Santos wrote and directed over 10 short films, and during his third year of studies, completely independent of his film school, he wrote and co-directed a 50+ minute short feature, Brothers in Arms, which aired on MNET in 2006. He also had early work as a set decorator on Neill Blomkamp's unfinished Halo (series), and in working on visual effects for such short films as In a Place Without Love.

Dos Santos was born in Johannesburg, South Africa in 1984. He is the brother of director Robert dos Santos.

== Career ==
In 2007, for his graduation student film, Dos Santos wrote and directed At Thy Call, an award-winning short film about ethnic tension and military discipline in the South African Defence Force. The student film was produced for R40 000 ($2400) and screened at the Cannes Film Festival in 2008, as well as screening at Cape Winelands Film Festival, Durban International Film Festival and Coal Stove Festival, where it won best Visual effects, Best Cinematography and best short film. Fidel Namisi went on to write "The grand finale was at Thy Call, by Chris Dos Santos (DS Films). Having screened another film of Chris's at Off the Shelf last year (the Coal Stove Award-winning Ortega Prospekt), At thy Call was a study in the development of the personal style of Chris as a filmmaker. If there is one word that could be used to describe Chris, it would have to be gutsy. Why else would a kid from AFDA make a historical war epic that explores racial tensions between Afrikaners and Englishmen during the border wars of the 1980s? Dos Santos has also directed various music videos in South Africa, including "Guinness" by the Sunday Punchers and "Turning in My Sleep" by Prime Circle. He has directed two international feature films, namely Angel of the Skies and Last. Broken. Darkness.

== Feature films ==
Dos Santos got his first short feature film (56 minutes) debut at the age of 22 when his independent film Brothers in Arms: 1978, was aired on the national broadcasting network M-Net in South Africa in 2006. Dos Santos wrote, co produced and directed the film with Dino Pappas, a long time friend and collaborator. Dos Santos was still in film school at the time of its completion. The film went on to win awards at the Apollo film festival and KKNK (Klein Karoo Nasionale Kunstefees) festival in Western Cape that same year.

=== Angel of the Skies ===
In 2011, at the age of 26, dos Santos directed Angel of the Skies, his first full-length independent feature film, which he also wrote. Angel of the Skies follows the story of South African Air Force pilot, Earl Kirk, played by Nicholas van der Bijl, who volunteers to fly for the British Royal Air Force during the Second World War. He and his diverse commonwealth bomber crew find themselves behind enemy lines when their stricken aircraft crash lands in Nazi occupied Europe. Hunted down by SS soldiers, led by Stutze (David James, District 9), their attempt to return home is challenged, and a story emerges to reveal the heart of friendship in the face of death.

The film was produced by Andrew MacDonald, and executive produced by Diony Kempen and dos Santos. The film was a joint co-production between Welela Studios and DS Films Entertainment, the latter being dos Santos' own production house. The cast included fellow AFDA film students Nic Van Der Bijl, Jason Glanville, Brad Backhouse, Andre Frauenstein, Ryan Dittman, Nic Rasenti and introduced Australian actress Lillie Claire and fellow Australian Adam Boys. dos Santos cast David James as the film's antagonist. The film was shot entirely in Gauteng, South Africa in 19 days, on Canon 7D HDSLR cameras with a budget of $30,000. The film took dos Santos four years to complete from when he first started writing in 2009 till completion in 2013. Due to the small budget, and being inspired by Robert Rodriguez' book, A Rebel Without a Crew, dos Santos taught himself 3d animation and visual effects during 2009 and 2010, thus enabling him to create the visual effects for the film himself. Filming of Angel of the Skies took place in August 2011 and was shot on locations such as the South African Air Force Museum, Air Force Base Swartkop and Cullinan area.

==== Release and reception ====
Angel of the Skies was picked up by Kaleidoscope Film Distribution in the United Kingdom in March 2013. The film was then shown at the Marché du Film at the 2013 Cannes Film Festival with Kaleidoscope acting as the films worldwide sales agent. Together, the film was successful in securing distribution in 27 international territories, a first for dos Santos. These territories include United Kingdom, United States of America, Canada, Brazil, Italy, Korea, Japan, Germany, Australia and most of Europe. The film never secured a release in South Africa, dos Santos' home territory.

Since the release of Angel of the Skies in 2013, dos Santos has been praised for his ability to make his projects look more expensive than they cost to produce. In an interview for Tonight's magazine IOL, dos Santos was asked by having achieved so much with a low budget, what advice he'd give aspiring film-makers. His response was “Don’t give up. Stick to your guns. People will say you can’t do it, but don’t listen to them. In fact, people told me I wouldn’t do it. I stuck through it and I believed in it, it took me four years and it does pay off. The film got international distribution. So it’s great that it’s playing worldwide.”

Angel of the Skies was released in Germany on DVD, Blu-ray and VOD (video on demand) on 19 November 2013 under the title "Wings of Honour" as well as being released in the United Kingdom on similar platforms on 4 November 2013 under the title "Battle for the Skies". The film was released under its proper title, Angel of the Skies, in the USA on 31 December 2013 through distributor eOne through DVD, Blu-ray, and various online platforms such as iTunes, Microsoft Store, and Netflix in Canada.

=== Last Broken Darkness ===
In March 2014, dos Santos began writing his 2nd feature film, titled Last Broken Darkness. Principal photography started a year later on May 6, 2015, for a period of 27 shooting days. The film was shot entirely in Johannesburg South Africa, and stars Sean Cameron Michael, Brandon Auret, Brendan Murray and introduces newcomer Suraya Rose Santos.

==== Awards ====
Last Broken Darkness first played to a public audience in February 2017 at the Boston Sci-Fi film festival, the oldest and longest running genre film festival of its kind, which screens over 100 genre films during the 10-day festival. The film was well received, winning two awards, namely best performance for Sean Cameron Michael and best screenplay for dos Santos.

In late 2017, at the SASC (South African Society of Cinematographers) awards dinner, the very prestigious Visible Spectrum award for best cinematography in a feature film, the highest accolade given by the SASC, was awarded to cinematographer William Collinson, for his exemplary work on Last Broken Darkness. Collinson worked extremely close with dos Santos during both pre production and production of the film, helping create the beautiful dystopian post apocalyptic world that dos Santos wanted his story to take place in.

=== Release ===
Last Broken Darkness was released in the United States on cinema and VOD platforms on October 29, 2021, through distributor Vertical Entertainment. The film also received worldwide release through Europe and Asia via VOD and online streaming platforms such as AppleTv, Google Play Store, Amazon Prime etc.

New York Times rated Last Broken Darkness as one of the top five films to stream upon its release in 2021.

== Filmography ==
Film
Year	Title	Type
2006	Brothers in Arms – 1978	Short feature
2006	Ortega Prospekt	Student short Film
2008	At Thy Call	Student Short Film
2011	Angel of the Skies	1st feature film
2015	Last Broken Darkness	2nd feature film

Music videos
Year	Band	Song title	Record label
2007	Changing Face	Forgiveness	Sting Music
2010	Evolver One	The World's Gone Crazy	David Gresham Records
2010	Evolver One	Stand	David Gresham Records
2010	Evolver One	Criminal	David Gresham Records
2010	Prime Circle	Turning in My Sleep	EMI
2011	Saving Silence	Somehow	David Gresham Records
2011	Splinter Town	Calling You	Independent
2011	Juje	My Need	Black Diamond Group
2012	Colombia's Finest	Gypsy Wand	Independent
2012	Sunday Punchers	Guinness	Independent
2013	LOSTLY	If Not You, Who?	Discovery World Label
2013	Lady Zee – EDIT	Can't Sing My Song	
2014	The Duchess	Right Beside Me	Independent
2014	The Duchess	Raising the Roof promo	Independent
2014	LOSTLY	No Direction Home	Discovery World Label
2015	Marno Van der Merwe	Huil Vir My	Eikonik Records
2015	Marno Van der Merwe	O my Liefde	Eikonik Records
