= Slumber Party Massacre (2021 film) =

2021 film by Danishka Esterhazy

- Promotional release poster
- Directed by: Danishka Esterhazy
- Written by: Suzanne Keilly
- Based on: The Slumber Party Massacre by Rita Mae Brown
- Produced by: Adam Friedlander; Samantha Levine; Tebogo Maila
- Starring: Hannah Gonera; Frances Sholto-Douglas; Alex McGregor; Mila Rayne; Reze-Tiana Wessels; Schelaine Bennett; Rob van Vuuren; Jennifer Steyn
- Cinematography: Trevor Calverly
- Edited by: David Trevail
- Music by: Andries Smit
- Production companies: Blue Ice Studios; Raven Banner Entertainment; Shout! Studios
- Distributed by: Shout! Factory
- Release dates: September 27, 2021 (Fantastic Fest); October 16, 2021 (Syfy)
- Running time: 86 minutes
- Countries: United States; South Africa
- Language: English

Slumber Party Massacre is a 2021 slasher film directed by Danishka Esterhazy and written by Suzanne Keilly. It is described as a "modern reimagining" of and stand-alone sequel to the original 1982 film The Slumber Party Massacre, and the fourth film released in the overall Massacre franchise. It stars Hannah Gonera, Frances Sholto-Douglas, Alex McGregor, Mila Rayne, Reze-Tiana Wessels with Schelaine Bennett, Rob van Vuuren and Jennifer Steyn. It follows a girls' slumber party which becomes a bloodbath when an escaped mental patient arrives with a power drill.

Shout! Studios announced a remake of the film to be helmed by director Danishka Esterhazy and written by Suzanne Keilly. Production began in Stellenbosch, South Africa in March 2021, with the cast being announced in April.

Slumber Party Massacre made its world premiere at the Fantastic Fest in Austin, Texas on September 27, 2021, and was released on Syfy Channel on October 16. The film received generally mixed reviews from critics, with praise for its feminist themes, gore and the performances of the cast, but criticism for its screenplay, character development and pacing.

== Plot ==
In 1993, Trish Devereaux is having a slumber party in a cabin in Holly Springs, California, with friends Jackie, Kim, and Diane. After arriving to confront Trish, her ex-boyfriend Chad looks through a window, sees the girls dancing, and begins to masturbate. Russ Thorn, a killer who uses a power drill, soon murders him. Russ then makes his way inside the cabin, killing Kim, Diane, and Jackie in the process. After getting drilled through her hand, Trish hits Russ with an oar, sending him inside the lake. It is believed that Russ drowned, but his body is never found.

In present-day L.A., Trish's daughter, Dana, is heading out for a girls' weekend with her best friends, Maeve, Breanie, and Ashley. En route, the girls learn that Maeve's younger sister, Alix, had stowed away. The girls reluctantly let Alix join them, as they are on their way to the house they rented. Their car breaks down in the renamed Jolly Springs. After seeing an ad for a cabin for rent that night, the girls talk to Kay, the owner of the general store and the cabin. Kay reluctantly lets the girls rent the cabin, but warns them to stay quiet and still. As the girls start dancing, Alix gets bored and goes out for a walk. She soon finds a truck in the middle of the road. Its owner is dead, and his eyes were drilled out. Alix returns to the cabin and recounts what she saw. The other girls then reveal to sport weapons such as knives and baseball bats. They know Russ Thorn is still alive and have set everything up in an attempt to bait him out and kill him once and for all after twenty more victims have fallen since Trish's encounter.

John and Matt, two guys from a cabin across the lake, then arrive. John is a fan of a crime podcast; he and his buddies have rented out the actual cabin where Russ Thorn killed Trish's friends. Noticing the weapons, Matt freaks out and leaves with John. Dana and Maeve realize that Russ could go after the guys. The guys return to the cabin and talk to Sean, Guy 1, and Guy 2. Guy 1 decides to go for a walk outside the cabin and sees Russ Thorn, who breaks out the drill and kills him. When the girls arrive at the guys' cabin, Russ turns off the lights and, during the chaos, murders Guy 2. Sean grabs his guitar while Matt and John grab the legs of their chairs and go after Russ, despite the girls' warning. As Dana encounters Russ, a chase leads to Sean getting drilled in the face. Russ follows Dana to her cabin and attempts a sneak attack, but is soon met by the girls, who kill him together.

The next morning, Matt is killed while taking a shower. Meanwhile, while the other girls attempt to call the police, Alix is forced to watch Russ's body, but begins to get violently ill from a tin of cookies gifted the night before. While attempting to fix Maeve's SUV, Ashley is murdered by Matt's killer. The others discover that Russ' body has disappeared and see Ashley's corpse, before being attacked by her assailant, who uses a nail gun. Breanie is killed by a nail to her eye.

As Dana looks for help, she is confronted by John, who thinks that she is responsible for Matt and Guy 1's deaths. Dana pleads with John to leave together to get help, but he ends up ditching her. Dana later finds Kay, who is revealed to be the one who killed Matt, Ashley, and Breanie. She is Russ Thorn's mother and seeks revenge. Kay goes after Dana, Maeve, and Alix, but Trish then arrives and starts a fight with her. Kay uses a blade against Trish's injured hand, but its nerves are completely damaged and she cannot feel pain. Dana gives Trish Russ' broken drill bit, which Trish uses to stab Kay. As Kay dies, Trish, Dana, Maeve, and Alix hug.

== Cast ==
- Hannah Gonera as Dana Devereaux
- Frances Sholto-Douglas as Maeve
- Alex McGregor as Breanie
- Mila Rayne as Alix
- Reze-Tiana Wessels as Ashley
- Schelaine Bennett as Trish Devereaux
  - Masali Baduza as young Trish Devereaux
- Rob van Vuuren as Russ Thorn
- Jane de Wet as Jackie Cassidy
- Reem Koussa as Kim Clarke
- Larissa Crafford-Lazarus as Diane
- Jennifer Steyn as Kay Thorn
- Michael Lawrence Potter as John
- Arthur Falko as Chad
- Nathan Castle as Sean
- Eden Classens as Matt
- Richard White as Guy #1
- Braeden Buys as Guy #2
- Richard Wright-Firth as Dave

== Production ==
Shout! Factory obtained the rights to 270 of Roger Corman's Concorde-New Horizons library titles and opted to remake The Slumber Party Massacre, hiring Danishka Esterhazy to direct the film with Suzanne Keilly hired to write the script. The cast was announced in April 2021 with Hannah Gonera, Frances Sholto-Douglas, Alex McGregor, Mila Rayne, and Reze-Tiana Wessels as the would-be victims.

Production began in Stellenbosch, South Africa in March and only took eighteen days to shoot. Director Danishka Esterhazy and writer Suzanne Keilly intended to make the remake true to the original intention of Rita Mae Brown's 1982 script, but "flip the script" on classic horror movie tropes. A fan of the original franchise, Esterhazy used establishing shots from the 1982 original film as well as give "easter eggs" in the form of the "goose lamp" from the original and Sean's guitar is that of the one used by the Driller Killer in Slumber Party Massacre II without the auger at the end of it.

Originally, co-star Rob van Vuuren auditioned for the mechanic Dave before being asked to read for the role of the "Driller Killer" Russ Thorn. As van Vuuren comes from a physical theater background, he prepared for the role by watching clips of Michael Villella in the original 1982 film as well as watch an interview with Villella about how he played Thorn. While he was praised for his take on Russ Thorn, van Vuuren admits all he did was to emulate Villella. Having seen the film on November 10 during its South African premiere, van Vuuren said he enjoyed the film and said he wants to do more horror films as a result of his experience with this film.

On July 5, at the Cannes Film Festival, Raven Banner unveiled the sales art, which reveals comedian Rob Van Vuuren as the killer Russ Thorn alongside Gonera, Sholto-Douglas, McGregor, Rayne, and Wessels.

== Release ==
The film made its world premiere at the Fantastic Fest in Austin, Texas on September 27, 2021. The film debuted on the Syfy Channel on October 16.

== Reception ==
On the review aggregator website Rotten Tomatoes, 100% of 19 critics' reviews are positive, with an average rating of 7.6/10. Trace Thurman of Bloody Disgusting calls the film "a welcome addition to this new wave of modern slashers". Leslie Felperin of The Guardian Weekly praises Esterhazy saying "Esterhazy and co have a few clever-ish tricks up their sleeves that invert viewer expectations". Aedan Juvet of Screen Rant said that the film was one of the most rewatchable horror films of 2021, writing "much like its predecessor, it has the potential to become a total cult classic".
