= Frances Sholto-Douglas =

South African actress

- Born: Frances Claire Sholto-Douglas; 16 May 1996 (age 30); Cape Town, South Africa
- Education: University of Cape Town
- Years active: 2015–present

Frances Claire Sholto-Douglas (born 16 May 1996) is a South African actress. Her films include Samson (2018), The Kissing Booth trilogy (2018–2021), Slumber Party Massacre (2021) and This Is How The World Ends (2026). On television, she is known for her roles in the film Dating Game Killer (2017) and the Netflix series Fatal Seduction (2023–).

== Early life ==
Sholto-Douglas was born in Cape Town. She has a sister Elsie. Sholto-Douglas trained in acting and dancing at the Cape Academy of Performing Arts before going on to graduate from the University of Cape Town with a degree in Theatre and Performance.

== Career ==
Sholto-Douglas played Lori Carter in the 2017 television film Dating Game Killer. The following year, she made her feature film debut with roles as Taren in Samson and Vivian in the Netflix teen film The Kissing Booth, the latter of which she had auditioned for in 2016. She would reprise her role as Vivian in The Kissing Booth sequels in 2020 and 2021 respectively. She also appeared in the BBC and Netflix miniseries Troy: Fall of a City and the Black Mirror episode "Rachel, Jack and Ashley Too".

In 2021, Sholto-Douglas appeared in the Slumber Party Massacre remake as Maeve. She starred opposite Bianca Oosthuizen in the Theatre Arts production of the play Earworm. In 2023, she began starring as Laura alongside Ngele Ramulondi in the 2023 series Fatal Seduction, also on Netflix. She also appeared in Delela at the Baxter Theatre Centre.

== Filmography ==
=== Film ===
| Year | Title | Role | Notes |
|---|---|---|---|
| 2018 | Samson | Taren | |
| 2018 | The Kissing Booth | Vivian | Netflix film |
| 2020 | The Kissing Booth 2 | Vivian | Netflix film |
| 2021 | The Kissing Booth 3 | Vivian | Netflix film |
| 2021 | Slumber Party Massacre | Maeve | |
| 2023 | Boy Kills World | Megan | |
| 2026 | This Is How The World Ends | Danni Freeman | |
| TBA | Just Now Jeffrey | Shireen | |

=== Television ===
| Year | Title | Role | Notes |
|---|---|---|---|
| 2016 | No Man Left Behind | Receptionist | Episode: "Colombia Vice" |
| 2016 | Killer Instinct with Chris Hansen | Sarah Krombach | Episode: "Kill or Be Killed" |
| 2017 | Blood Drive | Girl | 2 episodes |
| 2017 | Dating Game Killer | Lori Carter | Television film |
| 2018 | Troy: Fall of a City | Handmaiden | 3 episodes |
| 2018 | Order of the Dragon | Chiara Rostov | Television film |
| 2019 | Black Mirror | Carmen | Episode: "Rachel, Jack and Ashley Too" |
| 2021 | Grow | Melissa | 4 episodes |
| 2023–present | Fatal Seduction | Laura | Main role |
| TBA | Revelation Road | Keira | Upcoming |

== Stage ==
| Year | Title | Role | Notes |
|---|---|---|---|
| 2021–2022 | Earworm | | Theatre Arts, Cape Town |
| 2023 | Delela | | Baxter Theatre Centre, Cape Town |
