= Jennifer Steyn =

South African actress

- Born: 29 October 1961 (age 64); George, South Africa
- Education: University of Cape Town
- Occupation: Actress
- Years active: 1985–present

Jennifer Steyn (born 29 October 1961) is a South African actress. She is best known for the roles in the television serials such as; Madam & Eve, Jacob's Cross and Fallen.

== Personal life ==
Steyn was born on 29 October 1961 in George, South Africa. In 1983, she graduated from University of Cape Town (UCT) with a BA Performer's Diploma in Speech and Drama. She is married to the actor Nicky Rebelo

== Career ==
In 2000, she played the role "Tillie de Wet" in the serial Onder Draai die Duiwel Rond. Then she appeared in the serial Soul Buddyz with the role Arlene. In 2001, she joined with e.tv comedy satire Madam & Eve with the role "Marge". After popularity, she reprised her role in the second season as well. In 2005, she acted in the science fiction television series Charlie Jade with the role "Andrea Bridger". In 2006, she made the role "Bodine" in the SABC3 comedy serial Shado's.

In 2007, she appeared in the e.tv sports drama Shooting Stars with the role of "Marjorie Goldstein". In the next year, she made another supportive role of "Gloria" in the third season of M-Net drama Jacob's Cross. One of her major role in television came through the SABC1 comedy series Abo Mzala, where she played the role of "Mrs Fleming". She continued to play the role for three consecutive years until conclusion of third season in 2018. In the meantime, she got the opportunity to appear in the SABC1 drama serial Fallen with the role "Deborah Churchill".

Apart from them, she also appeared in numerous television serials and soapies such as; End of the Road, Jozi Streets, Justice for All, Jozi-H, The Human Family, The Principal, The Big Time, Clean Hands and Natural Rhythm. In the meantime, she made several notable appearances in the films across many genre such as: Cry the Beloved Country, Master Harold and the Boys, Gums and Noses, Goodbye Bafana, Red Dust, The Lovers, Merlin: The Return, Glory Glory, Pure Blood, Borderline, Duma, Free Fall, Windprints, Zimbabwe, Night Drive and Black Butterflies. In 2005, she acted in the Hollywood blockbuster adventure film Duma directed by Carroll Ballard. In 2007, Steyn was nominated for the Best Actress Award for her role in the film Goodbye Bafana at the South African Film and Television Awards. (SAFTA).

Apart from cinema and television, she performed in the South African theatre plays: The Fall of the House of Usher, Under Milkwood, Angels in America, Anthony and Cleopatra, Macbeth, King Lear, The Woman Who Cooked Her Husband, Old Boys and Green Man Fishing. For her role in the play Green Man Flashing, she was nominated for the Fleur du Cap for Best Actress and later for Dalro awards. Meanwhile, she also won the Fleur du Cap award for Best Actress for her role in British television play Blue Remembered Hills. As a voice-over artist, she rendered her voice for many television commercials for the brands; BMW, Exclusive Books, Land Rover, Stuttafords, MTN, FNB, Liberty life, Staysoft, and Edgars. In 2020, at the Fleur de Cap, she was nominated for Best Actress for The Goat or who is Sylvia and Best Supporting Actress for Aunty Merle it’s a Girl.

== Filmography ==
Year	Film	Role	Genre	Ref.
1992	No Hero	Kim Curtis	Film	
2000	Onder Draai die Duiwel Rond	Tillie de Wet	TV series	
2000	Soul Buddyz	Arlene	TV series	
2001	Madam & Eve	Marge	TV series	
2005	Charlie Jade	Andrea Bridger	TV series	
2005	Sorted	Guest role	TV series	
2006	Shado's	Bodine	TV series	
2007	Shooting Stars	Marjorie Goldstein	TV series	
2008	Jacob's Cross	Gloria	TV series	
2010	Home Affairs	Prof Edwards	TV series	
2011	Abo Mzala	Mrs Fleming	TV series	
2011	Fallen	Deborah Churchill	TV series	
2011	The Wild	Surgeon/Dr Winters	TV series	
2021	Slumber Party Massacre	Kay Thorn		
2022 - present	Recipes for Love and Murder	Hattie Wilson	TV series	
