= Dominika Jablonska =

Polish South African actress

- Born: Dominika Novak Jablonska; 20 August 1985 (age 41); Łódź, Poland
- Education: National School of the Arts; University of Cape Town
- Occupations: Actress, casting department
- Years active: 2006–present
- Height: 1.63 m (5 ft 4 in)
- Spouse: divorced (2016)

Dominika Novak Jablonska (born 20 August 1985) is a Polish-born South African actress. She is best known for roles in popular series and films such as Krakatoa: Volcano of Destruction, The Most Beautiful Day and Our Girl.

== Personal life ==
She was born on 20 August 1985 in Łódź, Poland. In 1990, her family emigrated to South Africa, where she completed her education at the National School of The Arts in 2003. In 2004 she accepted a scholarship to study a BSc in Health Sciences, however left after a year to return to dramatic arts. In 2009, she graduated with a BA in Theatre & Performance at the University of Cape Town.

== Career ==
In 2006, she made her acting debut in the BBC docu-drama, Krakatoa: Volcano of Destruction. In 2010, she landed the supporting lead of 'Julia Carvalho' in the South African television series League of Glory. She subsequently played featured roles in several BBC series such as; The Runaway, Wild at Heart and Our Girl. She also featured in films such as The Dating Game Killer (dir. Peter Medak) and The Last Face (dir. Sean Penn).

Alongside acting, she also has extensive behind-the-scenes experience as a commercials casting director and production assistant. She is credited as casting assistant in The Girl, Labyrinth and Flight of the Storks.

== Filmography ==
Year	Film	Role	Genre	Ref.
2006	Krakatoa: Volcano of Destruction	Elisabeth	TV movie	
2009	Diamonds	Denmont Maid	TV movie	
2010	League of Glory	Julia Carvalho	TV series	
2011	The Runaway	Maureen	TV mini-series	
2012	The Girl	Casting assistant	TV movie	
2012	Labyrinth	Casting assistant	TV mini-series	
2012	Wild at Heart	Beth	TV series	
2012	Dirty Laundry	Jill	Short film	
2013	Mary and Martha	Pilates Teacher	TV movie	
2013	Flight of the Storks	Casting assistant	TV mini-series	
2013	Vehicle 19	Casting assistant	Film	
2013	Zulu	Casting assistant	Film	
2014	Black Sails	Casting assistant	TV series	
2014	The Wrong Mans	FSB Analyst	TV series	
2014	Knysna	Debra	Film	
2016	The Most Beautiful Day	Nazi Fetish Girl	Film	
2016	The Last Face	News Reporter	Film	
2017	The Forgiven	Forensic Clerk	Film	
2017	The Dating Game Killer	Susan Babineau	TV movie	
2018	Our Girl	Clem	TV series	
