= Dating Game Killer (film) =

2017 biographical television film

- Written by: Darrell Fetty; Adam Freeman; Leslie Greif
- Directed by: Peter Medak
- Starring: Guillermo Díaz
- Composer: Ozzy Doniz
- Country of origin: United States
- Original language: English

Production
- Executive producers: Angela Bromstad; Darrell Fetty; Adam Freeman; Leslie Greif; Peter Medak
- Producer: Zaheer Goodman-Bhyat
- Cinematography: Trevor Michael Brown
- Editor: Martin Hunter
- Running time: 86 minutes
- Production companies: Thinkfactory Media; Light and Dark Films

Original release
- Network: Investigation Discovery
- Release: December 3, 2017

Dating Game Killer, also known as The Dating Game Killer, is a 2017 biographical television film about serial killer Rodney Alcala. It was directed by Peter Medak and broadcast on Investigation Discovery.

== Plot ==
The film tells the story of Rodney Alcala, a convicted serial killer believed to be responsible for over 130 murders. In 1971, he is caught after having raped and beaten 8-year-old Rosie Hoffman, but because her parents move her to Mexico, she does not testify at Alcala's trial, and he is charged only with assault. He is repeatedly charged with abusing girls, but his good behavior and kind manners gain him preferable treatment and light sentences. He is repeatedly declared reformed, enabling him to commit more murders. In 1978 he appeared on the television show The Dating Game in the midst of his killing spree.

Alcala is ultimately identified by a park ranger who saw him walking with a murder victim named Tammy Jensen days before her body was discovered at the same location. This eyewitness account provides police with the evidence they need to finally arrest Alcala. In his Seattle storage locker they find the earrings Tammy Jensen was wearing when she disappeared, and he is sentenced to death. This conviction is overturned in 1984 due to the prosecution's reference to Alcala's previous crimes causing bias in the jury, but he is retried and sentenced to death again in 1986. A change in the law allows his DNA to be collected in 2002, connecting him to further murders. In 2013, Alcala represents himself at trial, calling on himself for testimony and answering his own questions. Rosie Hoffman returns 42 years after her attack to finally testify against her attacker, and her testimony as well as the testimony of Tammy Jensen's mother Carol help sentence Alcala to death for five counts of abduction, murder, and special circumstances. In 2012 he pleaded guilty to two more murders in New York. In 2016 he was charged with the 1977 murder of a woman in Wyoming.

== Cast ==
- Guillermo Díaz as Rodney Alcala
- Robert Knepper as Detective Jim Hamell
- Carrie Preston as Carol Jensen
- Tanya van Graan as Shauna Bradshaw
- Matt Barr as Detective Ryan
- Kim Engelbrecht as Joanne
- Frances Sholto-Douglas as Lori Carter
- Meganne Young as Wendy Cade
- Daniah De Villiers as Tammy Jensen
- Deon Lotz as Camp Director Lee
- Camilla Wolfson as Helen Vogel
- Trix Vivier as Susan's Friend in Club
- Athena Strates as Camper Kaye
- Lee Raviv as Becky Wilkins
- Alma Martinez as Anna Alcala
- Byron Langley as Tyler
- Kate Liquorish as Judith O'Reilly
- Darrell Fetty as Donald Haines
- Mark Wijsman as Jury Foreman
- Lily Spangenberg as Young Rosie
- Dominika Jablonska as Susan Babineau
- Grant Ross as Superior Court Clerk
- Greg Parves as Park Ranger (as Greg Parvess)
- Gina Shmukler as Rosie Hoffman
- Jessica Dawson as Pamela
- Jamie Anders as Courtroom Attendee
- Taryn Uria as Sophie

== Production ==
This was the first original scripted film produced by Investigation Discovery.

== Reception ==
In a positive review for HuffPost, reviewer JR gave the film an A−, writing, "There was clearly a lot of time, discussion, and development about how to execute and deliver the story and it shows in the finished product right from the start." The reviewer went on to praise the acting, writing, "Guillermo Diaz and Carrie Preston deliver career best performances. Their courtroom scenes are so good, as a viewer you want to hit rewind and watch them again (I did three times). Carrie Preston should win the Emmy next September for Best Supporting Actress in a TV Movie or Miniseries. Guillermo should be recognized as well come Emmy time."
