= The Last Victims =

- Directed by: Maynard Kraak
- Written by: Sean Robert Daniels
- Story by: Sean Robert Daniels; Terwadkar Rajiv
- Produced by: Maynard Kraak; Terwadkar Rajiv
- Starring: Sean Cameron Michael; Kurt Egelhof; Wilson Dunster; Baby Cele; Gustav Gerdener; Ashish Gangapersad; Marno van der Merwe; Hayley Owen
- Cinematography: Meekaaeel Adam
- Edited by: Terwadkar Rajiv; Cohen Lorenzo Davids
- Music by: Geo Höhn
- Release dates: 8 February 2019 (Pan African Film Festival); 28 February 2020
- Running time: 125 minutes
- Country: South Africa
- Language: English

The Last Victims is a 2019 political drama film directed by Maynard Kraak. The film was filmed entirely on location in KwaZulu-Natal South Africa and world premiered at the Pan African Film Festival (PAFF) on 8 February 2019. The film then opened the Rapid Lion - South African International Film Festival at the historic Market Theater in Johannesburg, South Africa on 1 March 2019. It screened "in competition" with three nominations: Best Feature Film, Best Cinematography (Meekaaeel Adam) and Best Actor in a Leading Role (Sean Cameron Michael). The film was then selected at 40th Durban International Film Festival (DIFF), Durban South Africa. The film is now selected in competition at Knysna Film Festival, Knysna, South Africa & African Movie Academy Awards (AMAA) in Nigeria. The film is nominated in 3 different section at AMAA viz. Best Screenplay (Sean Robert Daniels), Best Editing (Terwadkar Rajiv & Cohen Lorenzo Davids) & Best Sound (Janno Muller).

== Plot ==
The film follows Dawid, a former member of South Africa's infamous C1 Counter Insurgency death squad, who must atone for his past when he helps one survivor Pravesh search for the bodies of a missing anti-apartheid cell. Unaware that as they hunt for answers, they too are being hunted.

"Notwithstanding that this film is based on real events, it is definitely a uniquely South African story because it’s about a fractured search for reconciliation in the face of a harrowing past that refuses to die out", says Rapid Lion festival director, Eric Miyeni,"It is a great metaphor for today’s South Africa".

== Main cast ==
- Sean Cameron Michael - Dawid
- Kurt Egelhof - Pravesh
- Marno van der Merwe - Young Dawid
- Ashish Gangapersad - Young Pravesh
- Grant Swanby - Warren
- Wilson Dunster - Francois
- Mark Mulder - Wouter
- Deon Coetzee - Viaan
- Kobus Van Heerden - Young Wouter
- Tumie Ngumla - Young Lwazi
- Baby Cele - Old Lwazi
- Kira Wilkinson - Alice
- Shelley Meskin - Martha
- Sasha Stroebel - Luzanne
- Caitlin Clerk - Phoebe
- Ferdinand Gernandt - De Beer
- Sam Phillips - TRC Committee Chair
- Charles Bouguenon - Young Warren

== Accolades ==
| Award | Date of ceremony | Category | Recipient(s) | Result | Ref. |
|---|---|---|---|---|---|
| RapidLion - The South African International Film Festival | 1 March 2019 | Best Actor | Sean Cameron Michael | Nominated | |
| RapidLion - The South African International Film Festival | 1 March 2019 | Best Cinematographer | Meekaaeel Adam | Nominated | |
| RapidLion - The South African International Film Festival | 1 March 2019 | Best of South Africa | Terwadkar Rajiv & Maynard Kraak | Nominated | |
| Knysna Film Festival | 30 October 2019 | Best Film Finalist | Terwadkar Rajiv & Maynard Kraak | Nominated | |
| Knysna Film Festival | 30 October 2019 | Best Supporting Actor | Kurt Egelhof | Won | |
| African Movie Academy Awards (AMAA) | 27 October 2019 | Best Screenplay | Sean Robert Daniels | Nominated | |
| African Movie Academy Awards (AMAA) | 27 October 2019 | Best Editing | Terwadkar Rajiv & Cohen Lorenzo Davids | Nominated | |
| African Movie Academy Awards (AMAA) | 27 October 2019 | Best Sound Design | Janno Muller | Nominated | |
| Uganda Film Festival | 1 December 2019 | Best International Feature Film | Terwadkar Rajiv & Maynard Kraak | Won | |
| South Film and Arts Academy Festival (SFAAF) | | Best Lead Actor | Sean Cameron Michael | Won | |
| South Film and Arts Academy Festival (SFAAF) | | Best Director in Feature Film | Maynard Kraak | Won | |
| South Film and Arts Academy Festival (SFAAF) | | Best Screenplay in Feature Film | Sean Robert Daniels | Won | |
| South Film and Arts Academy Festival (SFAAF) | | Best Supporting Actor in Feature Film | Marno van der Merwe | Won | |
| South Film and Arts Academy Festival (SFAAF) | | Best Sound Design in Feature Film | Janno Muller | Won | |
| South Film and Arts Academy Festival (SFAAF) | | Best Make up in a Feature Film | Cindi Jane Laird | Won | |
| South Film and Arts Academy Festival (SFAAF) | | Cinematography Honorable Mention in Feature Film | Meekaaeel Adam | Won | |
| South Film and Arts Academy Festival (SFAAF) | | Editing Honorable Mention in Feature Film | Terwadkar Rajiv & Cohen Lorenzo Davids | Won | |
| South Film and Arts Academy Festival (SFAAF) | | Production Honorable Mention In A Feature Film | Terwadkar Rajiv & Maynard Kraak | Won | |
| South Film and Arts Academy Festival (SFAAF) | | Feature Film of the Month | Terwadkar Rajiv & Maynard Kraak | Won | |
| South Film and Arts Academy Festival (SFAAF) | | Best Thriller Feature | Terwadkar Rajiv & Maynard Kraak | Won | |
| Five Continents International Film Festival (FCIFF) | 3 February 2020 | Best Thriller Film | Terwadkar Rajiv & Maynard Kraak | Won | |
| Five Continents International Film Festival (FCIFF) | 3 February 2020 | Best Make Up | Cindi Jane Laird | Won | |
| Five Continents International Film Festival (FCIFF) | 3 February 2020 | Special Mention Sound Design | Janno Muller | Won | |
| Five Continents International Film Festival (FCIFF) | 3 February 2020 | Best Screenplay | Sean Robert Daniels | Nominated | |
| International Screen Awards | | Best International Film | Terwadkar Rajiv & Maynard Kraak | Won | |
