= Street Trash (2024 film) =

- Directed by: Ryan Kruger
- Written by: Ryan Kruger; James C. Williamson
- Story by: Ryan Kruger
- Produced by: David Franciscus; Ryan Kruger; Matt Manjourides; Justin A. Martell
- Starring: Sean Cameron Michael; Donna Cormack-Thomson; Joe Vaz
- Cinematography: Fabian Vettiger
- Edited by: Stephen Du Plessis
- Music by: Ebenhaezer Smal
- Production companies: Not the Funeral Home; Protagonist Studios; Stage 5 Films
- Distributed by: Protagonist Studios; Cineverse (Note: Cineverse released with their Bloody Disgusting and Screambox labels.); Vinegar Syndrome
- Release date: October 17, 2024 (Los Angeles)
- Running time: 85 minutes
- Countries: South Africa; United States
- Languages: English; Afrikaans; Yiddish
- Budget: $1 million

Street Trash is a 2024 dark comedy horror film directed, written, and produced by Ryan Kruger. The film serves as a spiritual sequel to the 1987 film of the same name.

The film had its world premiere at the New Beverly Cinema at Los Angeles on October 17, 2024, followed by streaming on digital platforms on November 19, and on Screambox on December 27.

== Plot ==
In the year 2050, in Cape Town, South Africa, the government decides to wipe out the homeless community by unleashing a new brand of gas called "Tenafly Viper", named after the "Tenafly Viper" alcohol of the original film.

== Cast ==
- Sean Cameron Michael as Ronald
- Donna Cormack-Thomson as Alex
- Joe Vaz as Chef

== Production ==
The film was announced on August 8, 2023, and principal photography began on Cape Town, being shot on 35mm. Filming wrapped on August 19. Post-production concluded by August 2024.

== Release ==
On August 8, 2023, Cineverse acquired the film distribution rights to the film, with a release on Screambox slated for 2024. The film had its world premiere at the New Beverly Cinema at Los Angeles on October 17, 2024, and began streaming on digital platforms on November 19, and on Screambox on December 27. The film was released in cinemas across the UK on January 10, 2025, and on digital and Blu-ray on February 17. Vinegar Syndrome a limited edition Blu-Ray on February 25, 2025. The film was showcased at the International Film Festival Rotterdam on January 30, 2025, and was also shown at the Durban International Film Festival on July 19.

== Reception ==
On the review aggregator website Rotten Tomatoes, 60% of 10 critics' reviews are positive. Metacritic, which uses a weighted average, assigned the film a score of 50 out of 100, based on 4 critics, indicating "mixed or average" reviews. Leslie Felperin of The Guardian wrote in his review "Tedious stretches of vulgar banter are interspersed with equally dull interludes during which people melt. Then it finally gets resolved after 85 very long minutes". Michael Talbot-Haynes of Film Threat wrote "Has all the subversive vibrations from the original throbbing like neon. Sit back and get ready to melt into your chair". Brian Orndorf of Blu-ray.com wrote in his review "The update doesn’t match the ’87 endeavor, as Kruger struggles with uneven tone and weak humor throughout the offering, which only really comes alive when destroying bodies".
