= Josh Kempen =

- Born: Joshua Kempen; 8 June 1988 (age 38); Johannesburg, South Africa
- Genres: Alternative/Indie/Indie-pop
- Occupations: Singer-songwriter, actor, model
- Instrument: Guitar
- Years active: 2015–present
- Labels: Warner Music Africa; EMI Music Australia

Josh Kempen (born 3 November 1988) is a South African and Australian singer-songwriter, actor and model. In 2018, his album, The Morning Show, was nominated for a South African Music Award for Best Alternative Album.

Since 2024 he has been part of the indie-pop duo, Pamela, with Sarah Ellen.

== Early life and education ==
Kempen was born in Johannesburg in South Africa in 1988. He emigrated to Australia as a child with his parents. The first album he owned was by Sixto Rodriguez. He learned the guitar at the age of fifteen. After high school, he pursued a law degree and qualified as an attorney. He worked at Harvey Nossel Attorneys in Johannesburg. He also worked as a waiter in Lake Como in Italy.

In 2021, he graduated from the National Institute of Dramatic Art in Sydney with a Diploma of Stage and Screen Performance.

== Career ==
=== Music ===
Kempen was performing at Oppikoppi in South Africa, where Warner Music South Africa executives saw him perform and subsequently offered him a record deal. He has also performed at Splashy Fen, South Africa's longest-running music festival.

In 2015, he released his debut EP, The Midnight Ship and received a nomination for "Songwriter of the Year" from the Southern African Music Rights Organisation (SAMRO). He was selected as an "Artist to Watch in 2016" by Deezer ZA. In 2016, he performed at the Park Acoustics music festival held at the Voortrekker Monument in Pretoria.

His debut album, The Morning Show was released in 2017. It was preceded by the singles, "The River" and "Pistol". "The River" peaked at number 9 on the South African iTunes chart and at number 6 on the South African singles chart. In March 2017, he released his third single, "Leave Me if You Can". In 2018, the album was nominated at the South African Music Awards for "Best Alternative Album". In support of the album, he performed on Radio 702, South Africa's leading radio station. He also performed on television's Expresso Morning Show on the SABC. The album charted at number 3 on the iTunes albums chart. It was described by Apple Music’s editor as “an album rich with narrative lyricism and sincere, hard one perspective." Apple Music also chose Kempen as “Artist of the Month.”

In 2020, he released his second album, Oltramarino. It was preceded by the singles, "Need Some Company" feat. Soulphia Town and "Promises".

Since 2024, he has been part of the indie-pop duo, PAMELA, with Neighbours actress, Sarah Ellen.

=== Acting ===
In 2011, he had a minor role in the South African historical drama, Winnie Mandela, based on the life of Nelson Mandela's former wife, Winnie Mandela.

In 2024, he appeared in a recurring role in the second season of Paramount+ drama series, Last King of the Cross. The series is set in Sydney's Kings Cross and Oxford Street.

In 2024, he returned to South Africa to film the feature film This Is How the World Ends, directed by Robert dos Santos. The film is set during the AfrikaBurn festival in South Africa.

=== Modelling ===
As a model, Kempen is represented by Vivien's Model Management in Australia, and The Circle in South Africa. Among his campaigns, he filmed an advert for Audi in 2023.

== Discography ==
=== Solo studio albums ===
- The Morning Show (2017)
- Oltramarino (2020)

=== EPs ===
- The Midnight Ship (2015)

=== As a duo ===
- It’s Nice to See You Here (2026) by Pamela
