= Robert dos Santos =

Film director

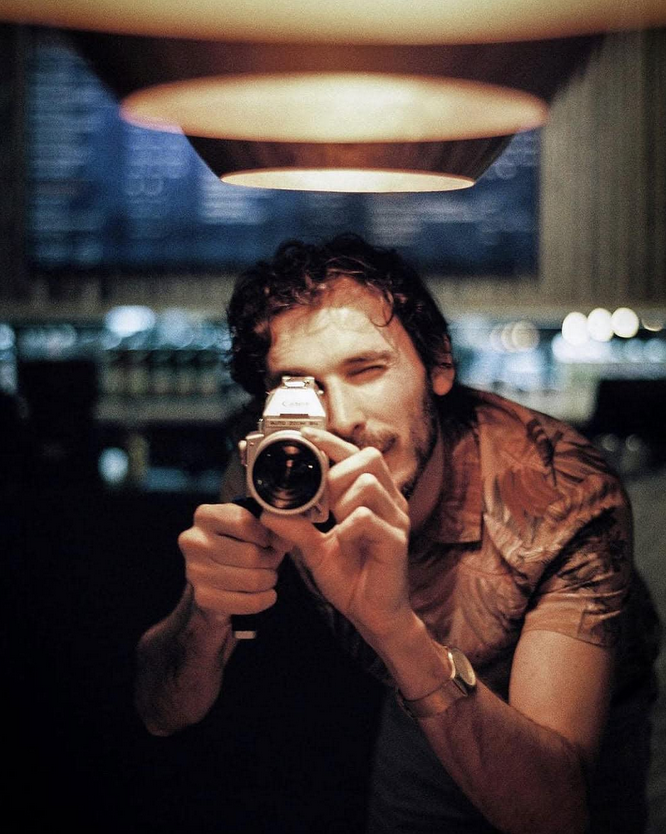
- Born: March 14, 1988 (age 38); Gauteng, South Africa
- Occupation: Director

Robert dos Santos (born 14 March 1988) is a South African-born Portuguese director. Dos Santos initially studied and practiced law before leaving the profession to pursue filmmaking.

== Personal life ==
Robert dos Santos was born in Johannesburg, South Africa. He initially studied philosophy and law before being admitted and practicing law as an Attorney of the Republic of South Africa before turning to directing. He is the brother of director Christopher-Lee dos Santos. He reportedly never attended film school.

== Career ==
Robert dos Santos left law and directed his first commercial, titled Light, which went on to be nominated for the BAFTA qualifying Aesthetica Awards. Dos Santos has directed numerous music videos for Warner Music Group and their artists.

His first narrative short film, titled A Moment, was shot using a specialized motion control camera rig to accommodate an unbroken continuous shot which required high speed camera movements and choreography.

In 2026, dos Santos made his feature directorial debut with This Is How The World Ends, released as the first direct-to-VHS film in 20 years.

=== Awards ===
Robert dos Santos has received over 30 award nominations worldwide including in the United States, United Kingdom, France, Germany, Croatia, South Africa, Brazil, and Australia. His first narrative short film, A Moment, won best film at the Los Angeles Film Awards. He received an honorable mention from the Hollywood New Directors in 2021.
