= Sean Cameron Michael =

South African actor (born 1969)

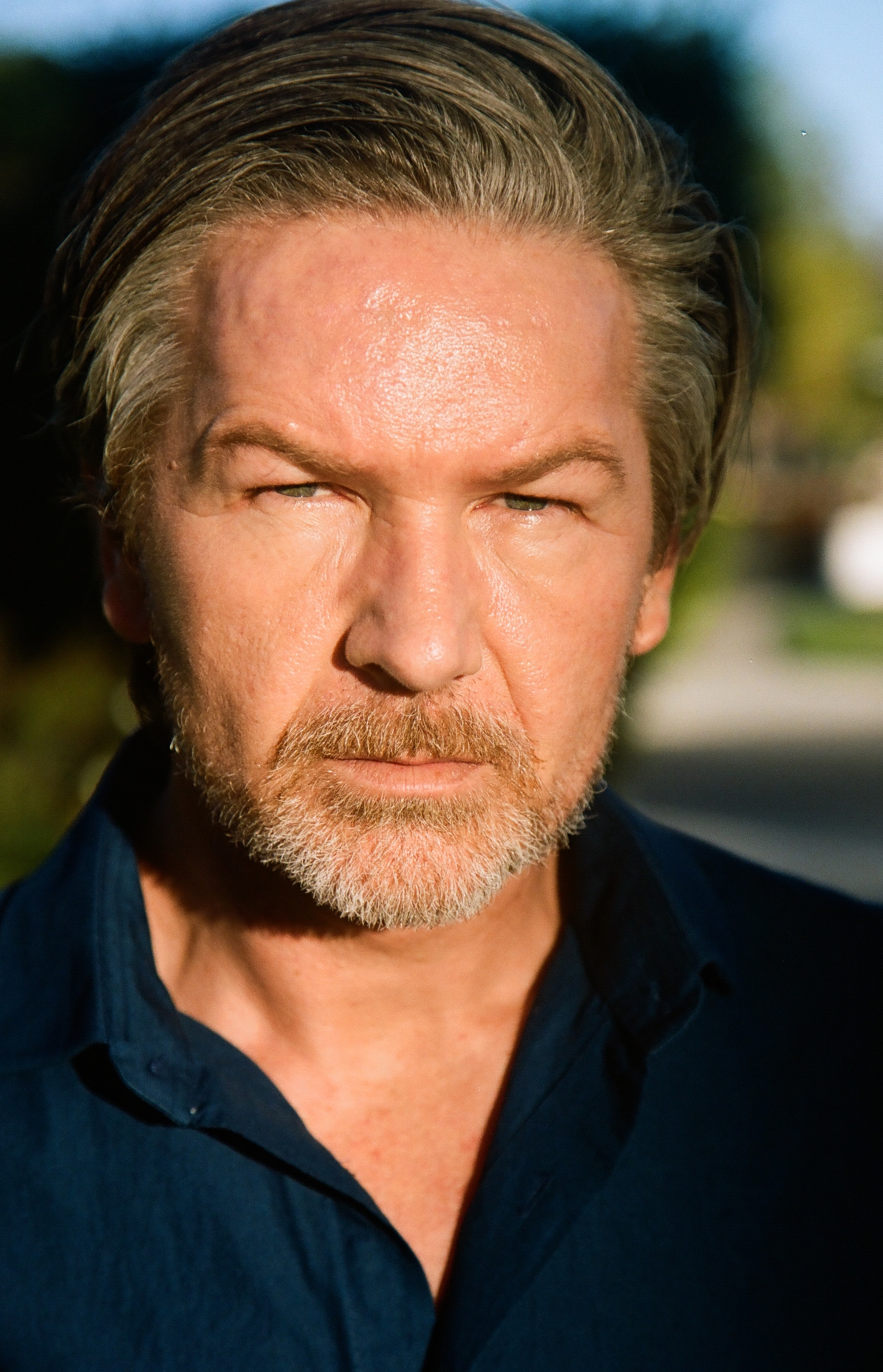
- Michael in 2017
- Born: 24 December 1969 (age 56); Cape Town, Western Cape, South Africa
- Education: Rita Maas-Phillips
- Occupation: Actor
- Years active: 1993–present
- Awards: SAFTA (2022)

Sean Cameron Michael (aka Sean C. Michael) (born 24 December 1969) is a South African actor, writer and singer. A native English speaker, he is also fluent in Afrikaans.

== Early life ==
Michael was born in Cape Town, South Africa. He became interested in acting at the age of 12, after appearing in several stage musicals.

While in school, he studied drama with RADA graduate Rita Maas-Phillips. After completing high school, Michael did his two years compulsory National Service as an infantryman in the South African Defence Force in Potchefstroom. After a number of part-time jobs (including being a waiter and a chef) he decided to become a full-time actor and singer.

== Career ==
Over the past three decades, Michael has performed in more than 130 international television series, shorts and feature films and recently received a 2022 SAFTA South African Film and Television Awards nomination as Best Supporting Actor in a Feature Film for his role as Ronald in Ryan Kruger's cult-hit Fried Barry. The SAFTAS is the South African equivalent of the American Oscars or British BAFTAS.

Michael began his career in 1993, playing the role of Thomas in an adaptation of The Gospel According to Matthew. In 1996, he had a recurring role as Brett on Egoli: Place of Gold, a long-running South African soap opera and was also a TV presenter and writer for SABC's "Teleschool" and "Tshisimane", a highlight being when he wrote and presented a TV special "TeleS in Space" where he interviewed NASA astronauts on the space shuttle Endeavor "live" via satellite as they orbited the Earth. It was the first time the new democratic South African flag had flown into space.

Michael's first significant American television role was in 2005 when he landed the support lead in Dean Devlin's mini-series The Triangle. Also, in 2008 he joined the cast of 24 playing French UN worker, Charles Solenz, in 24: Redemption. The New York Post singled out Michael's performance saying that his character "might be the most spineless, loathsome character ever created for this show."

In 2011, Michael portrayed the role of Thomas Edison in History Channel's series America: The Story of Us, scoring the highest viewership ratings in network history.

The following year, he played the lead in Animal Planet's TV special Mermaids: The Body Found, which scored the highest viewership ratings for the channel since 2003. He appeared in HBO's film The Girl and the Strike Back series. He also worked opposite Denzel Washington and Ryan Reynolds in Universal's Safe House. This was followed by working opposite Matt Damon and Morgan Freeman in Clint Eastwood's "Invictus". In 2013, he starred opposite the late Oscar winner William Hurt in BBC Films' Royal Television Society's film, The Challenger, about the space shuttle disaster. He then started work on season 1 of Black Sails. The show received several Emmy Awards. The second season premiered on 24 January 2015. Michael was considered for Emmy and SAG awards for his work on season one and two as series regular Richard Guthrie.

In 2015, he played the supporting role of Lester in the film The Salvation, for director Kristian Levring, and starring Mads Mikkelsen, Eva Green and Jonathan Pryce. The Danish western premiered at Cannes to a six-minute standing ovation.

In 2016, Michael guest starred in a number of US television shows, including Of Kings and Prophets (ABC), Criminal Minds: Beyond Borders (CBS) and Scorpion (CBS) in which he played the lead baddie, Shane Copley and once again was considered for an Emmy.

In 2017, he recurred as Russian diplomat Grigory Krukov in USA's hit conspiracy drama Shooter and as Old Man Heart in Syfy's Blood Drive

Michael also plays the lead role in the sci-fi short film "Tears in the Rain" which screened at the Boston SciFi Film Festival and won him the Jury and Audience Best Actor Award at the SciFi Underground Film Festival in Munich, Germany.

The actor was next seen as the main protagonist, Sam in director Christopher-Lee Dos Santos' indie feature "Last Broken Darkness". Michael won Best Performance by an Actor in a Feature Film for this role at the Boston SciFi Film Festival (2017).

In 2018, he guest starred as The Ghost (Connor) on CBS' MacGyver (2016 TV series) and was considered for an Emmy nomination for his portrayal.

Michael's next project was the political thriller The Last Victims for director Maynard Kraak. Its Hollywood premiere was at the Pan African Film Festival in February 2019, and then opened the Rapid Lion (South African International Film Festival) on 1 March 2019, where Michael was nominated for Best Actor in a Leading Role. Michael then went on to win Best Lead Actor in a Feature Film at the South Film and Arts Academy Festival in Chile.

In 2019 the busy actor played a recurring role on Deep State (TV series) on Fox and Epix as Colonel John Russell (opposite Walton Goggins), as well as "The Devil Speaks" and "Die Spreeus" for Kyknet. In 2020, he starred in the multi award-winning cult indie film Fried Barry and was nominated for a SAFTA Award (the South African equivalent of an Oscar) as Best Supporting Actor in a Feature Film. He then performed in "Triggered" (Samuel Goldwyn Films), The Last Days of American Crime (Netflix), "A Boere-Krismis" (Mnet), as well as "Vagrant Queen" (SyFy), "MariTeam" for Germany and "The Cars that made the World" (History).

In 2021 Michael was seen in the Netflix original feature "Angeliena" and guest starred in "Die Boekklub". He also starred in short films "Stay Safe" and "A Moment".

In 2022 he was seen opposite David Tennant in "Around the World in 80 Days" for the BBC and as a series regular in "Die Byl" for Kyknet (South Africa) and "Ludik" for Netflix.

Michael then recurred on Catch Me a Killer (TV series) on BritBox/Showmax as legendary FBI profiler Robert Ressler. He 2024 he played the lead in the 80's remake of the comedy / horror "Street Trash" which premiered at Quentin Tarantino's New Beverly Theater in Beverly Hills. This was followed by playing a lead in "Masinga - The Calling" premiering at the Pan African Film Festival in Los Angeles.

In 2026 he was seen as Commander Abner in "David: King of Israel" on FoxNation and opposite Ed Harris, Glen Powell and Margaret Qualley in A24 and Studio Canal's How to make a Killing released theatrically 20 February 2026. He also starred in Lifetime's "Angel in the Rubble" and as a lead in This is How the World Ends released theatrically in South Africa.

Michael serves as co-writer and executive producer in the Netflix Original feature "Collision".

He is attached as a lead in "Broken Brothers" and "Bloody Proposal", while two projects are currently in post-production "Spiral" and "A Bobby Thing".

== Filmography ==
=== Film ===
| Year | Title | Role | Notes |
|---|---|---|---|
| 1993 | The Gospel According to Matthew | Thomas | |
| 1994 | Woman of Desire | Waiter | Uncredited Role |
| 1996 | The Making of the Mahatma | Warder | |
| 1998 | Ernest in the Army | Soldier #3 | |
| 1999 | Pirates of the Plain | Shopping Network Announcer | |
| 2000 | Shark Attack 2 | News Anchor Man | Video |
| 2004 | Cape of Good Hope | Father Who Doesn't | |
| 2004 | Blast | Chopper Pilot | |
| 2005 | Mama Jack | Medic | |
| 2006 | Faith like Potatoes | Fergus Buchan | |
| 2007 | Confessions of a Gambler | Black Suit | |
| 2008 | Allan Quatermain and the Temple of Skulls | Allan Quatermain | Video |
| 2008 | The Making of 24: Redemption | Charles Solenz | Video Short |
| 2009 | Invictus | Springbok Equipment Manager | |
| 2009 | Albert Schweitzer | Sinclair | |
| 2010 | Themba | Dr. Max Taylor | |
| 2010 | Lost Boys: The Thirst | Ira Pinkus | Video |
| 2011 | Heart & Soul | Chris Bernard | Short |
| 2011 | Chiaroscuro | Doctor | Short |
| 2011 | There Are No Heroes | Agent HK | Short |
| 2012 | Safe House | Landlord | |
| 2012 | Heartbeat | Dr. Roberts | Short |
| 2013 | Death Race: Inferno | New Doctor | Video |
| 2013 | A Shot at the Big Time | Van Staden | Short |
| 2013 | Ross Jack: TV's in the Swimming Pool | Gangster | Short |
| 2013 | Jimmy in Pienk | Buk's Father | |
| 2013 | The Time Travelers | Ronald | Short |
| 2013 | Magic Bullet | Don | Short |
| 2013 | LCNVL: Dreamcatcher | Dreamcatcher | Short |
| 2014 | The Salvation | Lester | |
| 2014 | Prime Circle: Doors | Government Official | Short |
| 2016 | Sinner | The Intruder | Short |
| 2016 | The Weight of Wind | Nico | Short |
| 2016 | Lea to the Rescue | Ricardo Carvalho | |
| 2016 | Dis Koue Kos, Skat | Kobus | |
| 2017 | Tears in the Rain | John Kampff | Short |
| 2017 | Broken Darkness | Sam | |
| 2017 | The Mummy | Archaeologist | |
| 2017 | It's Complicated | Fairy Godmother | Short |
| 2019 | The Last Victims | Dawid | |
| 2020 | Fried Barry | Ronald | |
| 2020 | The Last Days of American Crime | Pete Slatery | |
| 2020 | Triggered | Mr. Peterson | |
| 2021 | Angeliena (Netflix) | Uber Driver | |
| 2021 | Stay Safe | Therapist | Short |
| 2021 | A Moment | Lead | Short |
| 2022 | Collision (Netflix) | Co-Writer / Executive Producer | |
| 2024 | Masinga | Jeremiah Mills | |
| 2024 | Boogieheads | The Voyeur | Short |
| 2024 | Spiral | Doctor | Short |
| 2024 | Street Trash | Ronald | Released |
| 2026 | This Is How The World Ends | Rick 'The Broadcaster' Douglas | Released |
| 2026 | How to Make a Killing | The Butler (Charles) | Released |
| 2026 | Angel in the Rubble | Frank Dougherty | Released |
| 2027 | A Bobby Thing | Supporting | Post-Prod |

=== Television ===
| Year | Title | Role | Notes |
|---|---|---|---|
| 1993 | Death in the Family | Warder | Guest Role: 1 episode |
| 1993 | Egoli: Place of Gold | Menasse's Disciple | Guest Role: 1 episode |
| 1996 | Egoli: Place of Gold | Brett | Guest Role: 7 episodes |
| 1996 | Rhodes | Messenger | Guest Role – 1 Episode |
| 1997 | The Adventures of Sinbad | Young Timur | Guest Role: 1 Episode |
| 1999 | CI5: The New Professionals | Male Officer | Guest Role: 1 Episode |
| 1999 | Fallen Angel | Doctor Antoine | TV movie |
| 2002 | Madam & Eve | Steven | Guest Role: 1 Episode |
| 2002 | Home Alone 4 | Cop | TV movie |
| 2002 | The Red Phone: Manhunt | Kathy's Father | TV movie |
| 2002 | Pavement | Uniform Cop 3 | TV movie |
| 2004 | This Life | Miles Stewart | Main role: 39 episodes (1 Season) |
| 2005 | Charlie Jade | Barry | Guest Role: 1 Episode |
| 2005 | Supernova | Customer #1 | TV movie |
| 2005 | Sci-Fi Inside: 'The Triangle' | Don Beatty | TV movie |
| 2005 | The Triangle | Don Beatty | Main role: 3 episodes (Mini Series) |
| 2006 | Operation Rainbow Warrior | New Zealand Journalist | TV movie |
| 2007 | To Be First | Orthopedic Surgeon | TV movie |
| 2008 | Ella Blue | Muller | South African Mini Series |
| 2008 | Shooting Stars | Jean-Pierre | South African Mini Series |
| 2008 | Crusoe | Nolan Moore | Guest Role: 1 Episode |
| 2008 | Special Forces Heroes | Ulrich Wegener | Documentary Series: 1 Episode |
| 2008 | 24 | Charles Solenz | TV movie |
| 2009 | Natalee Holloway | Paul Van Der Sloot | TV movie |
| 2010 | The Secret of the Whales | Journalist | TV movie |
| 2010 | America: The Story of Us | Thomas Edison | Documentary Series: 1 Episode |
| 2011 | Get Out Alive | Clifford Draper | Guest Role: 1 Episode |
| 2011 | Outcasts | Clark Johnson | Guest Role: 1 Episode |
| 2011 | Mermaids: The Body Found | McCormick | TV movie |
| 2011 | Beaver Falls | Uma's Dad | Guest Role: 1 Episode |
| 2012 | Infested! | Jeff Menning | Documentary Series: 1 Episode |
| 2012 | The Great British Story: A People's History | William Levett | Documentary Series: 1 Episode |
| 2012 | Strike Back | Dr. Vasiliev | Guest Role: 2 episodes |
| 2012 | The Girl | Robert Burks | TV movie: Uncredited Role |
| 2012 | Mankind: the Story of All of Us | Benjamin Latrobe Jr. | Documentary Series: 1 Episode |
| 2013 | The Challenger Disaster | Judson Lovingood | TV movie |
| 2013 | Banged Up Abroad | Detective Swainson | Documentary Series: 1 Episode |
| 2014 | When We Were Black | Detective | Main role: 6 episodes (season 2) |
| 2014–2015 | Black Sails | Richard Guthrie | Main role: 10 episodes (Seasons 1–2) |
| 2016 | Scorpion (TV series) | Shane Copley | Guest Role: 1 Episode |
| 2016 | Criminal Minds: Beyond Borders | Noah Coetzee | Guest Role: 1 Episode |
| 2016 | Of Kings and Prophets | Nabal | Guest Role: 2 episodes |
| 2017 | Blood Drive | Old Man Heart | Recurring Role: 8 episodes |
| 2016–2017 | Shooter | Grigory Krukov | Recurring Role: 4 episodes |
| 2017 | Origins: The Journey of Humankind | William Tyndale | Documentary Series: 1 Episode |
| 2018 | MacGyver | The Ghost / Conner | Guest Role: 1 Episode |
| 2019 | Die Spreeus (Kyknet) | Jeremy | Guest Role: 1 Episode |
| 2019 | Deep State (TV series) (Epix / Fox) | Colonel John Russell | Recurring Role: 3 episodes |
| 2020 | Vagrant Queen (SyFy) | Duke | Guest Role: 1 Episode |
| 2020 | MariTeam (ARD / W&B Television, Germany) | Milesh | Guest Role: 1 Episode |
| 2021 | The Cars that made the World | General Palmer | Guest Role: 2 episodes |
| 2021 | Die Boekklub (S3) | Richard | Guest Role: 1 Episode |
| 2021 | Die Byl (S3) | Harold Vermeer | Guest Role: 1 Episode |
| 2022 | Die Byl (S4) | Harold Vermeer | Series Regular: 10 episodes |
| 2022 | Ludik (Netflix) | Arend Brown | Series Regular: 6 episodes |
| 2023 | FDR (History) | Cordell Hull | Guest Role: 1 episode |
| 2024 | Catch Me a Killer (TV series) | Robert Ressler | Recurring: 2 episodes |
| 2024 | Die Byl (S5) | Harold Vermeer | Guest Role: 1 Episode |
| 2026 | David: King of Israel (S1) | Commander Abner | Recurring: 4 Episodes |
| 2026 | Suidooster | Dean Willoughby | Guest Role: 1 episode |
| 2027 | David: King of Israel (S2) | Commander Abner | Recurring: 4 Episodes |
