= Air Force Base Swartkop =

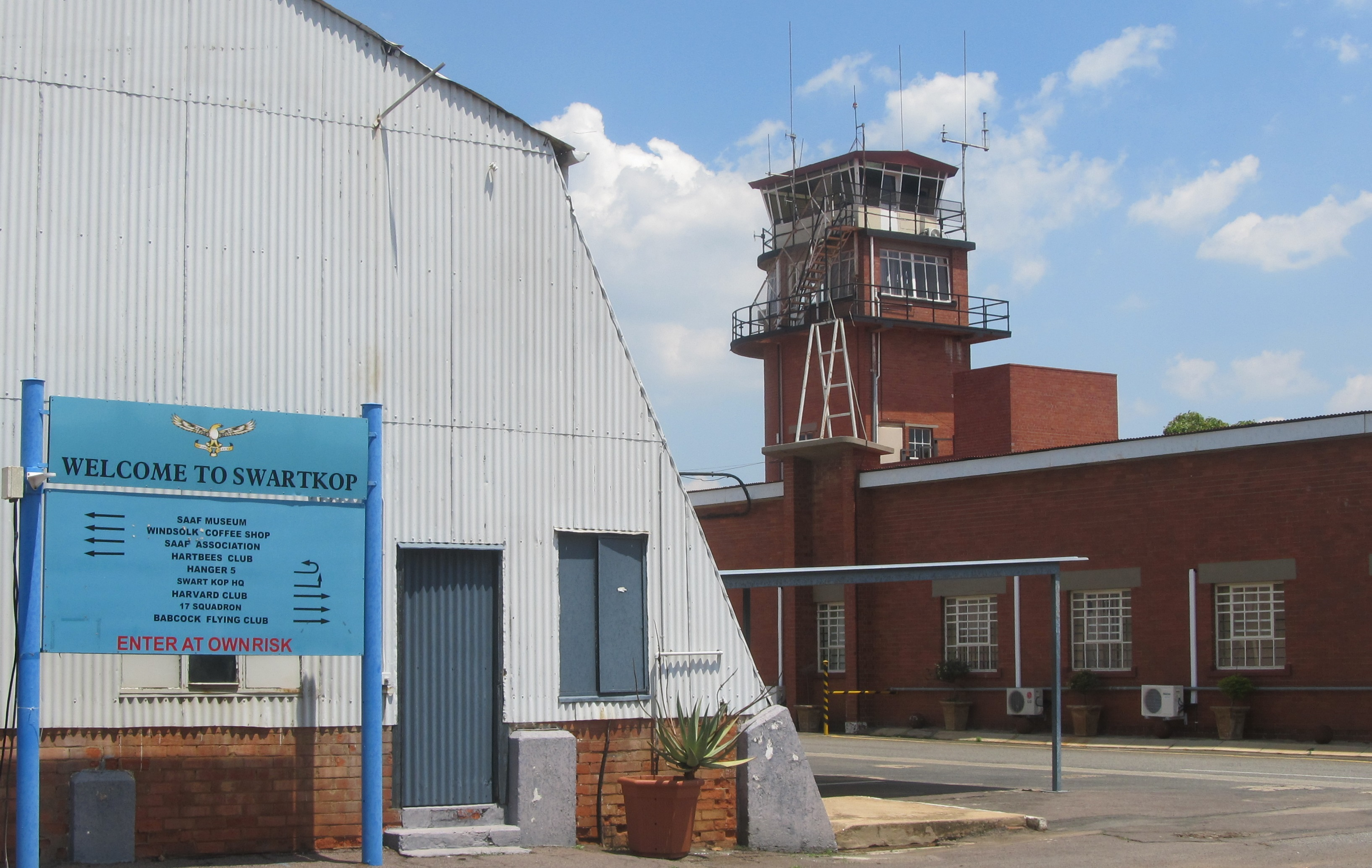
- Air Force Museum entrance featuring the welcome sign and air traffic control tower

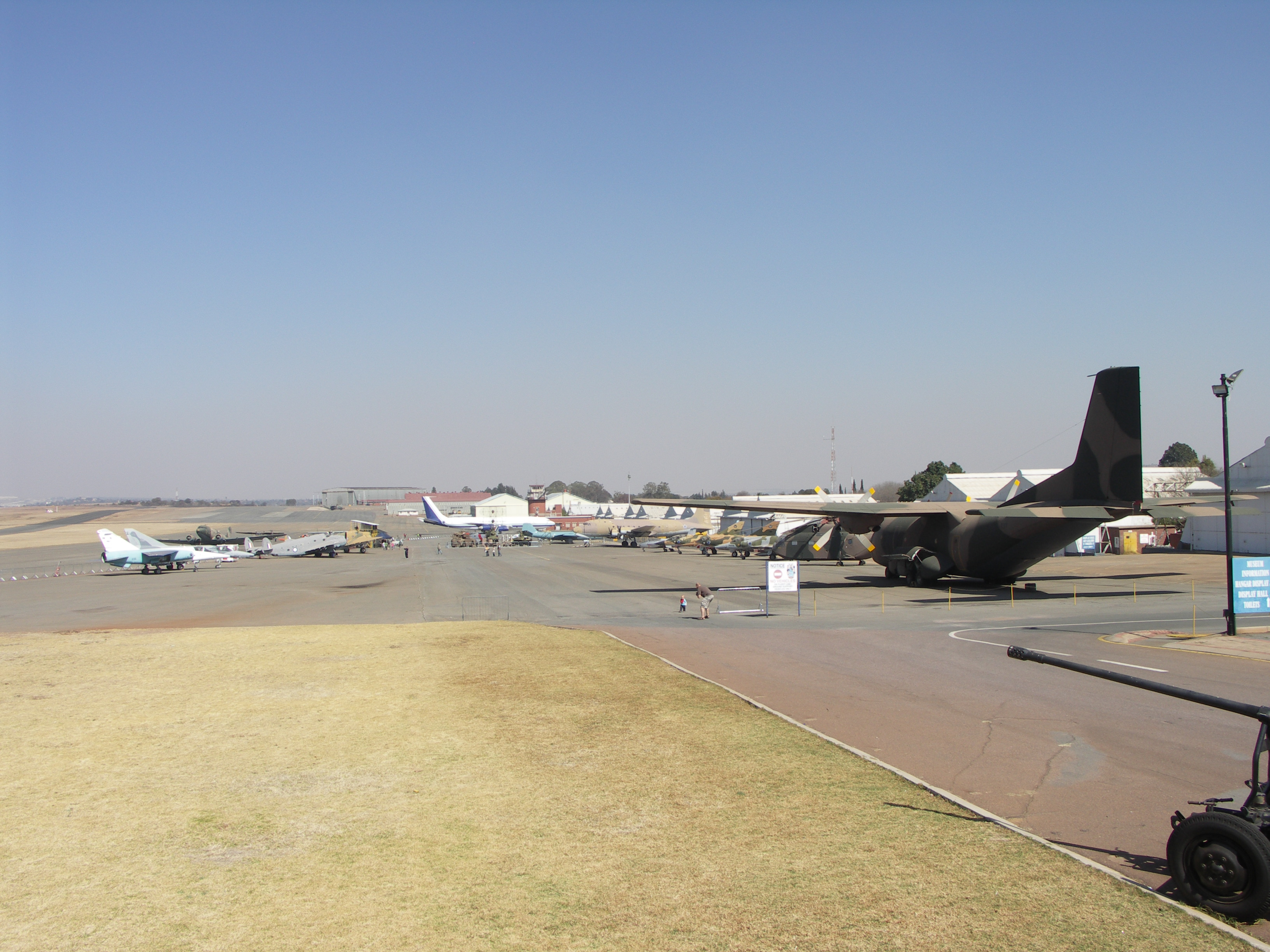
- Museum open day at AFB Swartkop
- IATA: none; ICAO: FASK

Summary
- Airport type: Military
- Operator: South African Air Force
- Location: Centurion, Tshwane, Gauteng, South Africa
- Elevation AMSL: 4,780 ft (1,460 m)
- Coordinates: 25°48′25″S 28°09′52″E

Map
- Location in Gauteng Province

Runways
Direction	Length		Surface
Direction	ft	m	Surface
02/20	6,520	1,987	Asphalt
06/24	6,589	2,008	Grass

Air Force Base Swartkop (ICAO: FASK) is South Africa's oldest air force base and houses the South African Air Force Museum. It is managed as part of AFB Waterkloof and houses one of the three branches of the South African Air Force Museum. The name of the air force base, Swartkop means Black hill in Afrikaans.

AFB Swartkop is located in the town Centurion (previously Verwoerdburg) in the Gauteng Province of South Africa, between Pretoria and Midrand, which is a part of the City of Tshwane Metropolitan Municipality.

== History ==
Air Force Station (AFS) Zwartkop was established in April 1921 after a private farm named Zwartkop was acquired by the Government in 1920. The Dutch spelling of Zwartkop was retained for the Air Force Station that was subsequently established there. On 1 April 1949, the Dutch spelling was dropped in favour of the Afrikaans spelling and resulted in Air Force Station Swartkop. The Air Force Station was upgraded to an Air Force Base on 1 February 1968. The name of the base reverted to the original "Zwartkop" in 2012.

The SAAF claims Swartkop is the second oldest air station in the world and the oldest operational air station in the world. Over the years many distinguished Squadrons have been based at Swartkop. This includes 26 Squadron SAAF which was formed there on 24 August 1942.

The Chief of the South African Air Force opened the relocated South African Air Force Museum at AFB Swartkop in 1993. The Air Force Base reverted to Air Force Station status in 1999. This decision was made by the South African Air Force to vacate the base and leave behind the South African Air Force Museum located there and to keep the Airfield as an extension of Air Force Base Waterkloof. The SAAF Museum Historic Flight has also moved to the airfield.

As of December 2013 the South African Air Force still hasn't vacated all operational units on the base. The South African Air Force Museum currently occupies the northern side of the base while 17 Squadron is housed at the southern side of the base.

In May 2023 the facility was redesignated a "mobile deployment wing".

== South African Air Force Memorial ==
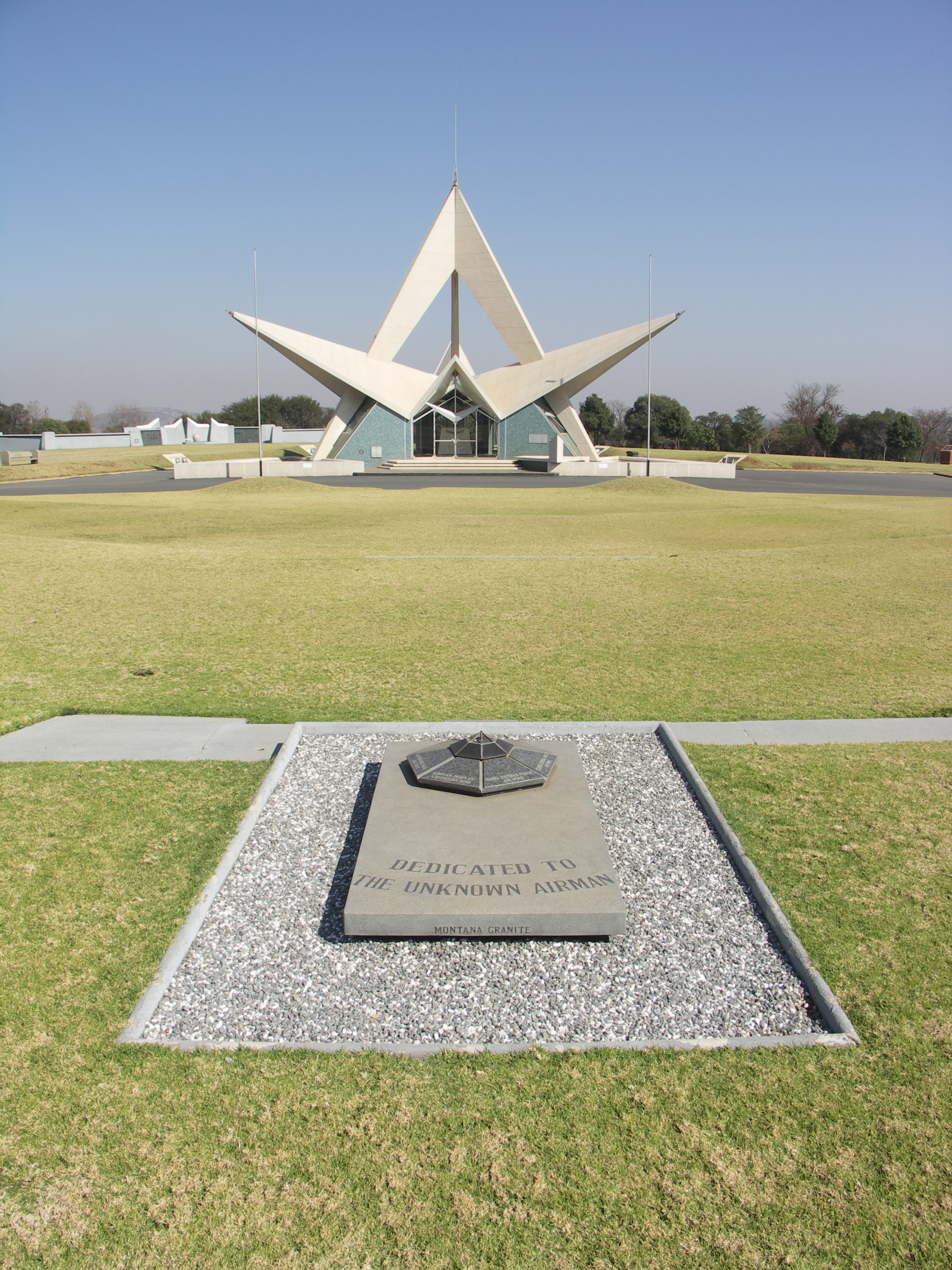
The SAAF Memorial at Swartkop, Pretoria

The South African Air Force Memorial is located at Swartkop. It contains a roll of honour of SAAF personnel who have been killed on duty as well as a memorial to personnel of all nations that died during the British Commonwealth Air Training Plan in South Africa.

== Gallery ==
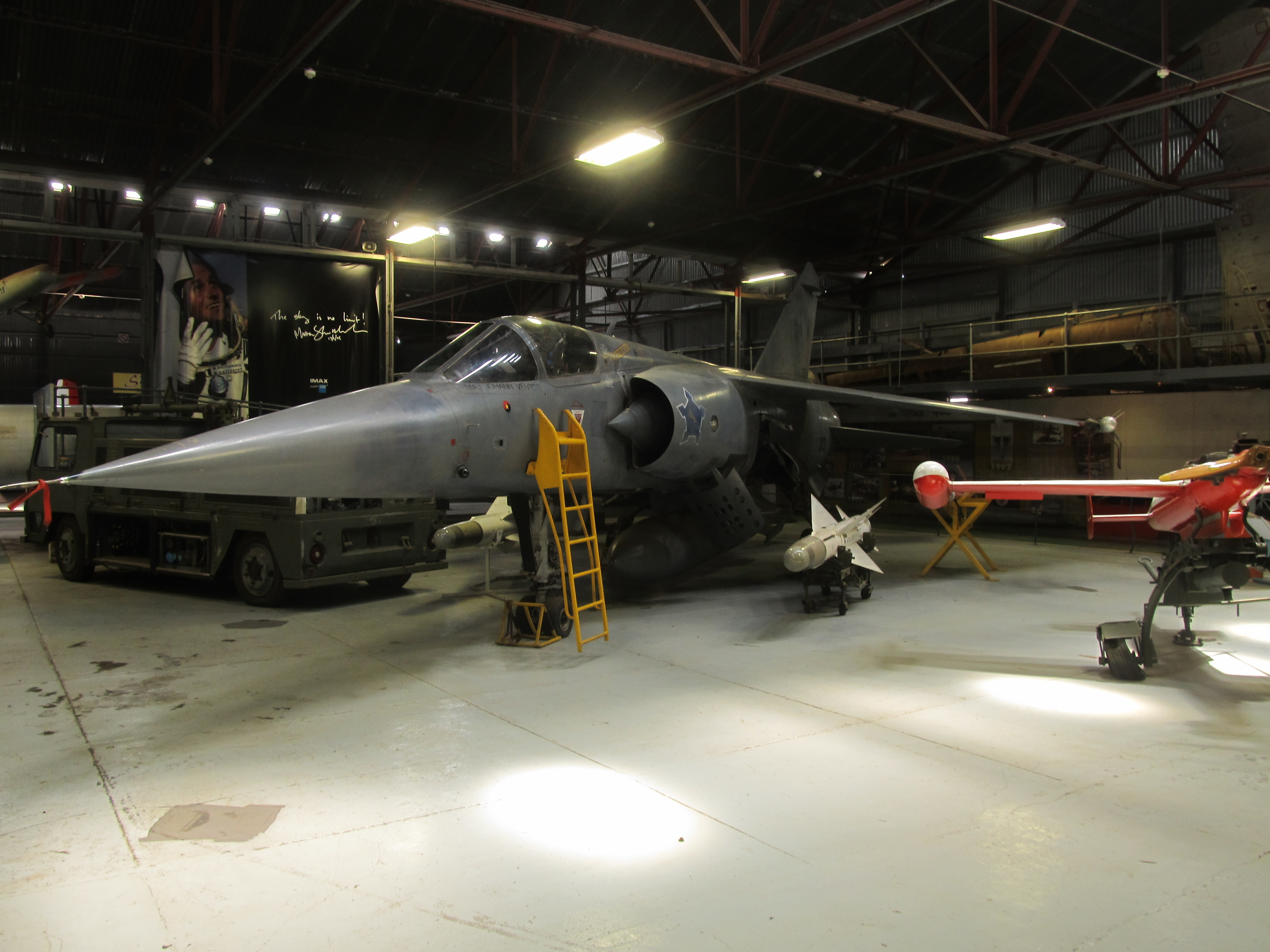
A SAAF Mirage F1 on static display as part of the South African Air Force Museum.

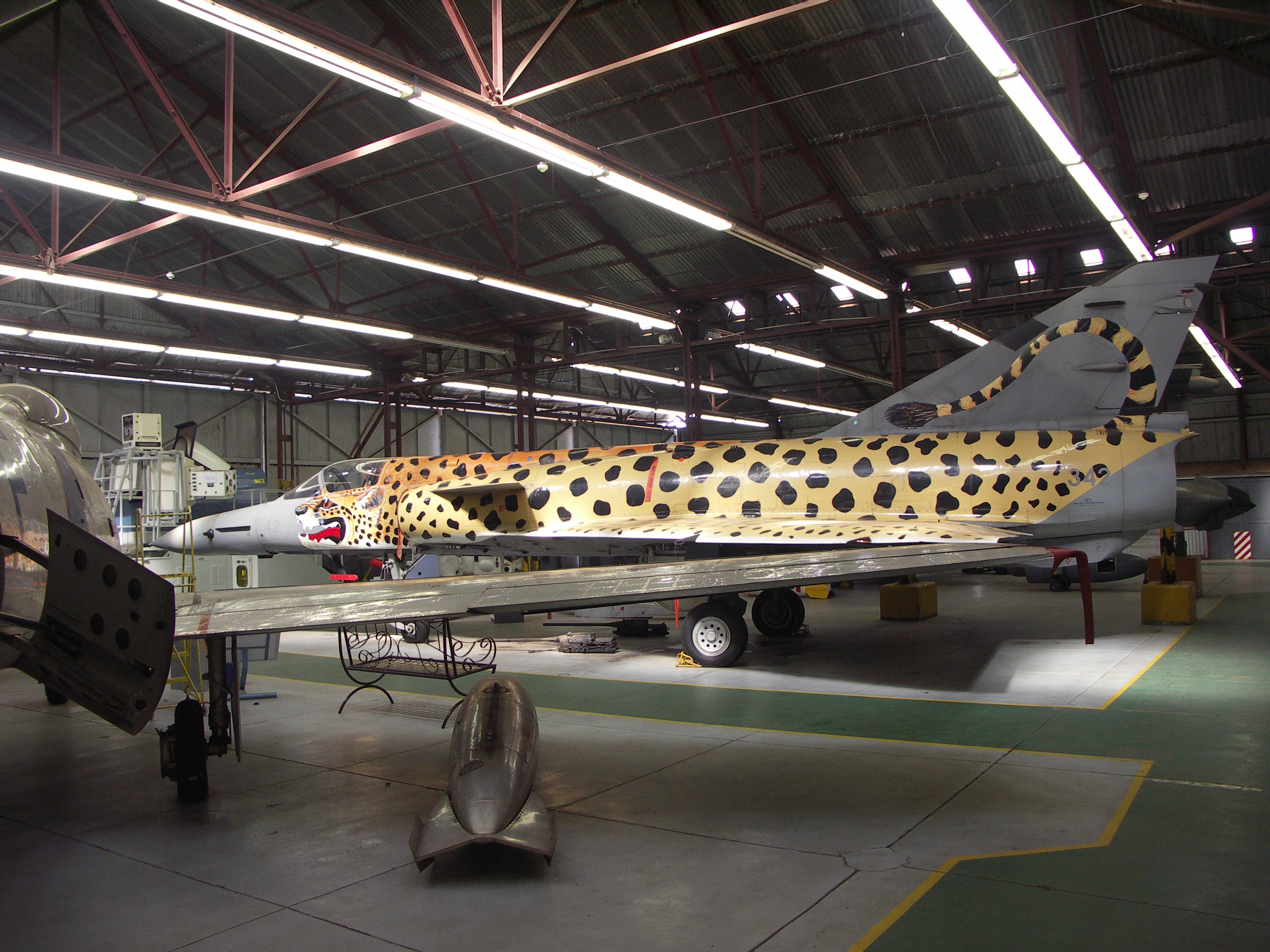
Cheetah C at the South African Air Force Museum.

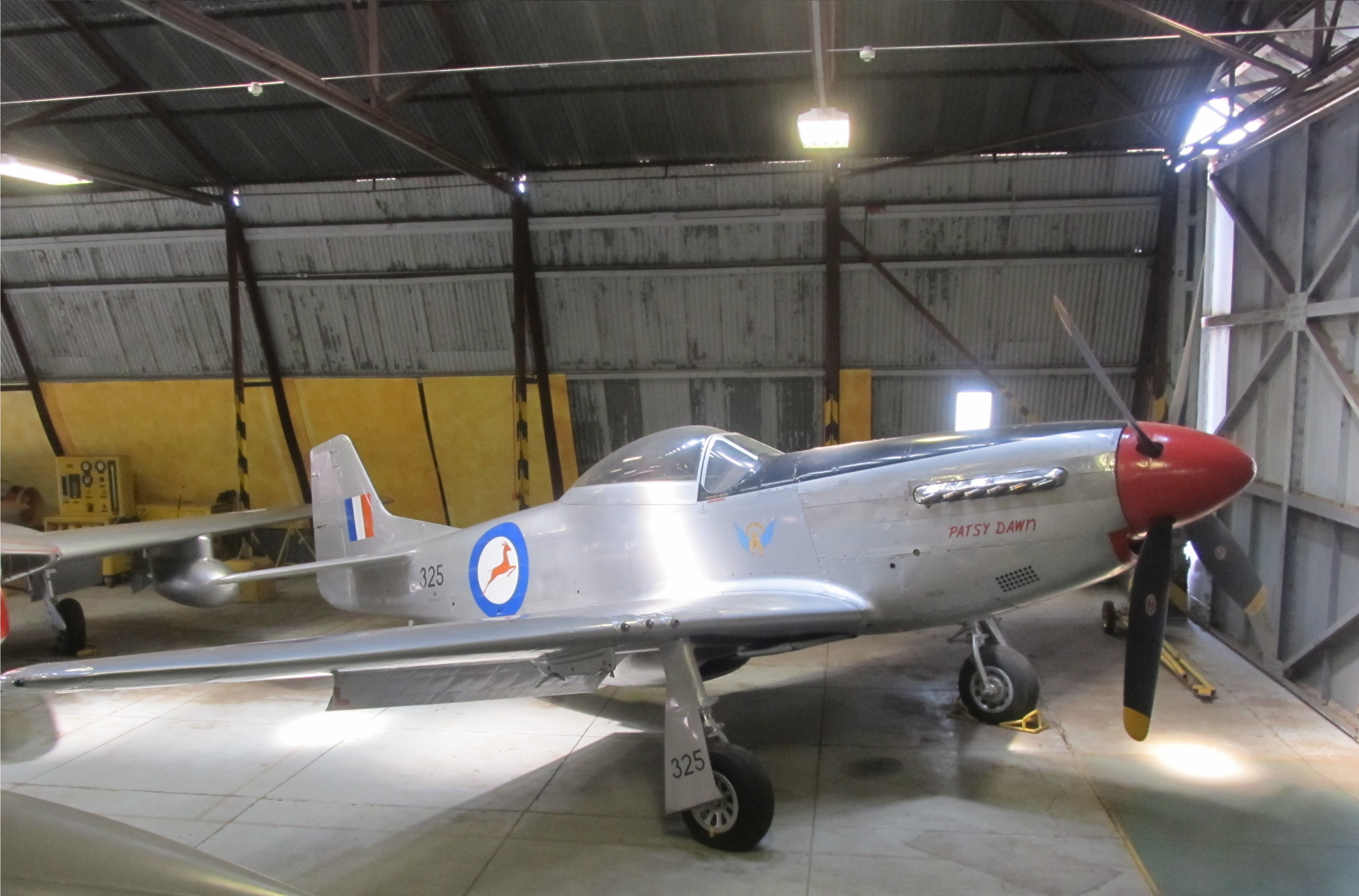
SAAF North American Mustang at the South African Air Force Museum.

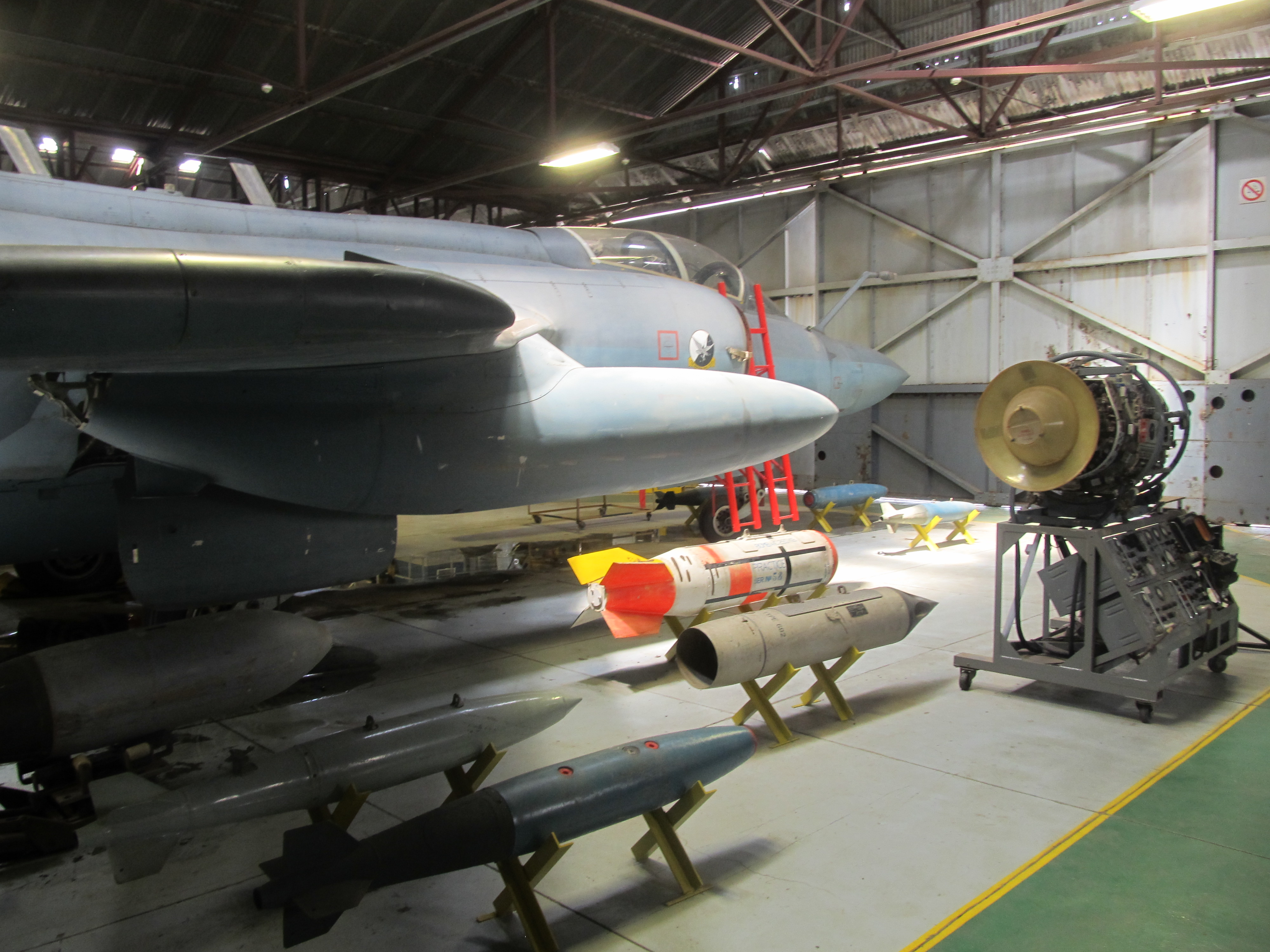
SAAF Blackburn Buccaneer on static display with munition loadout and its Blue Parrot radar system.

== See also ==
- South African Air Force
- South African Air Force Museum
- The Havard club of South Africa
