= South African Air Force Museum =

- Established: 26 October 1973
- Location: AFB Swartkop, Pretoria; AFB Ysterplaat, Cape Town; Chief Dawid Stuurman International Airport, Gqeberha South Africa
- Type: Aviation museum
- Website: http://www.saafmuseum.co.za/

SAAF Museum locations

The South African Air Force Museum houses exhibits and restores material related to the history of the South African Air Force. The museum is divided into three locations, AFB Swartkop outside Pretoria, AFB Ysterplaat in Cape Town and at Gqeberha's Chief Dawid Stuurman International Airport.

== Exhibits ==
=== AFB Swartkop ===
AFB Swartkop is home to the headquarters and largest of the three museum locations, occupying at least five hangars.

It contains a number of Dassault Mirage IIIs, Dassault Mirage F1s, Atlas Cheetahs and various other historical aircraft as well as aviation-related items on display such as ejection seats, uniforms, aircraft engines, aircraft weaponry and a Cheetah C flight simulator.

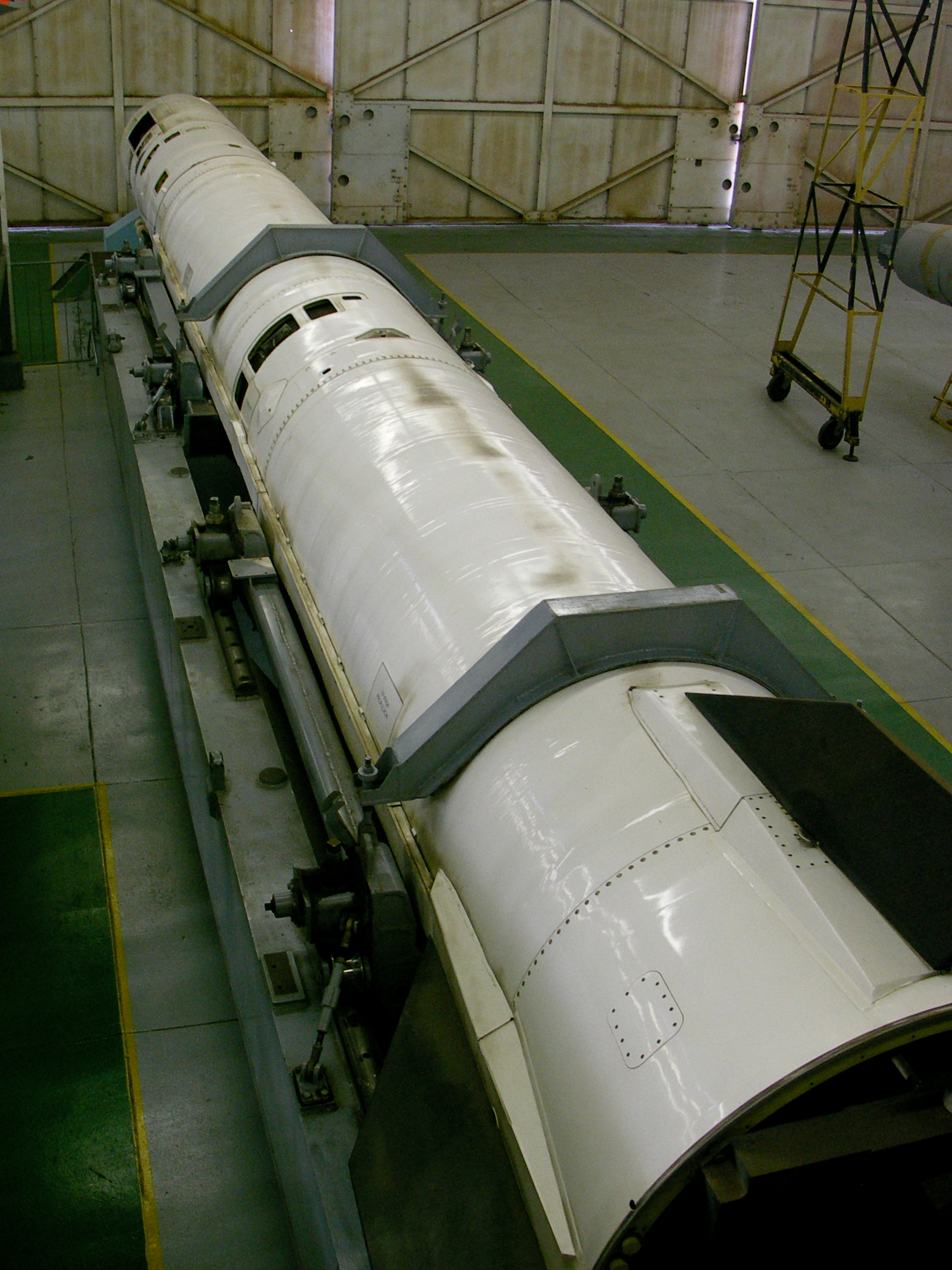
LEO deployment rocket at Swartkop

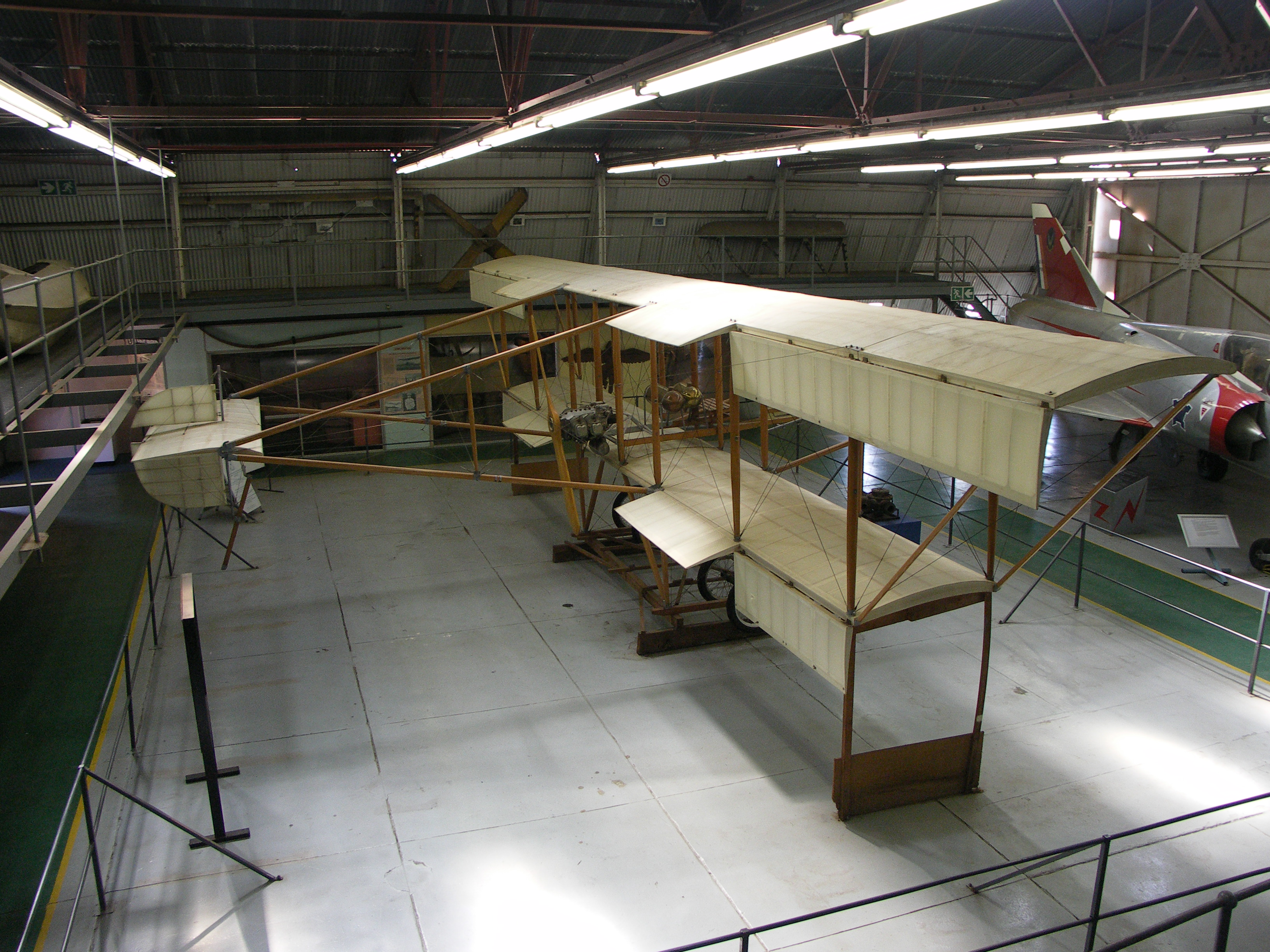
Replica Patterson Number 2 Biplane at Swartkop

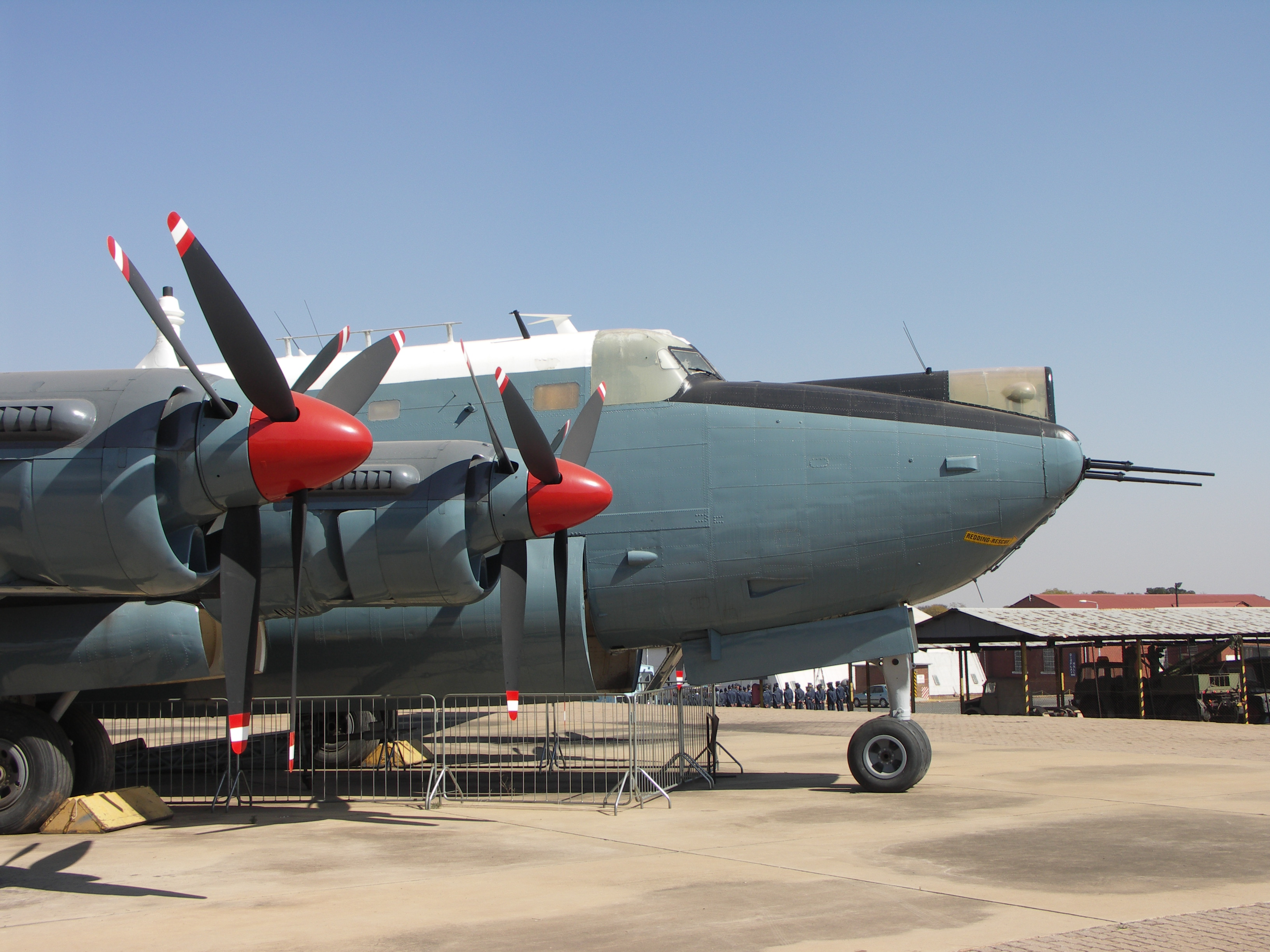
Avro Shackleton at Swartkop

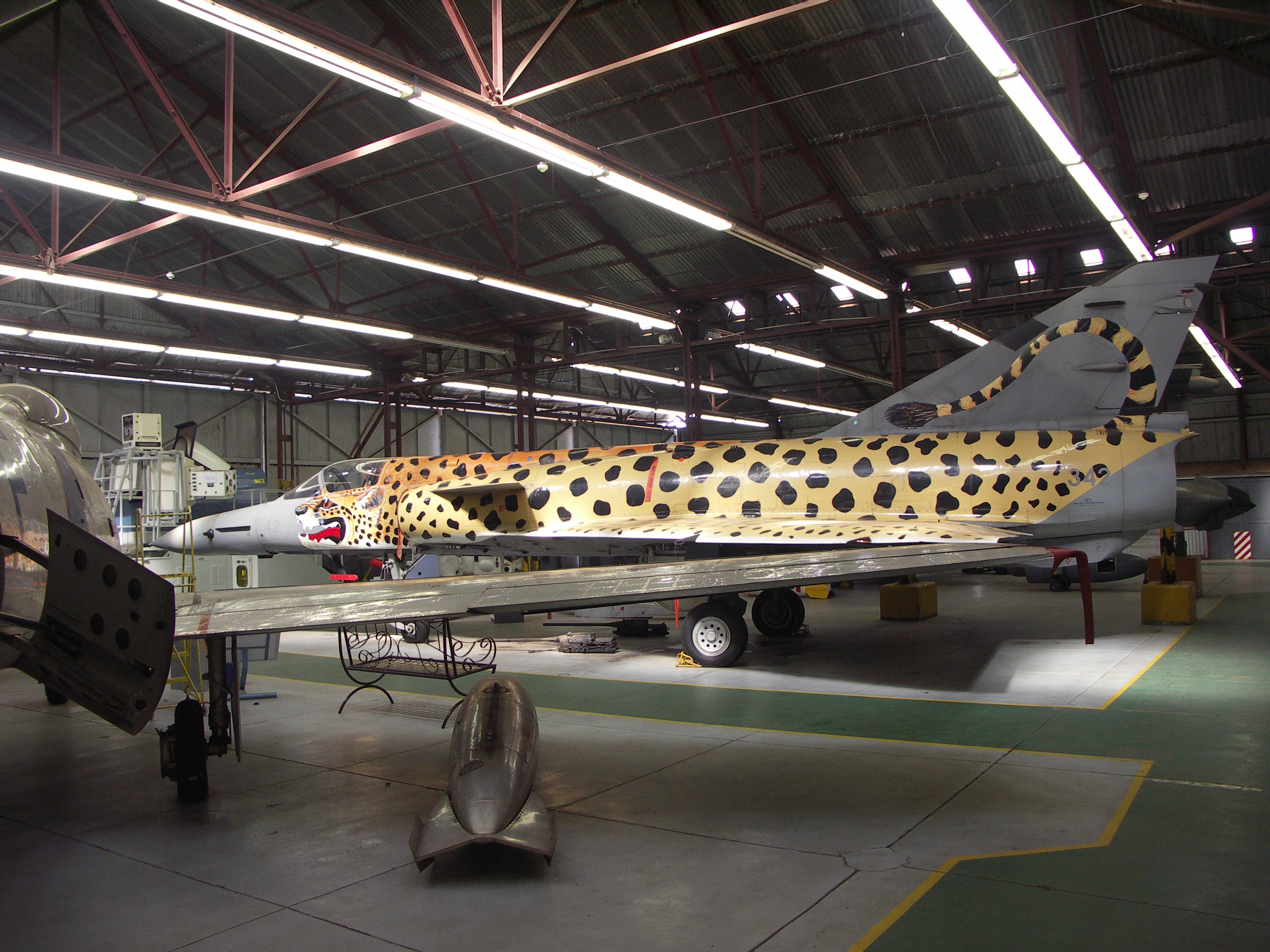
Cheetah C at Swartkop

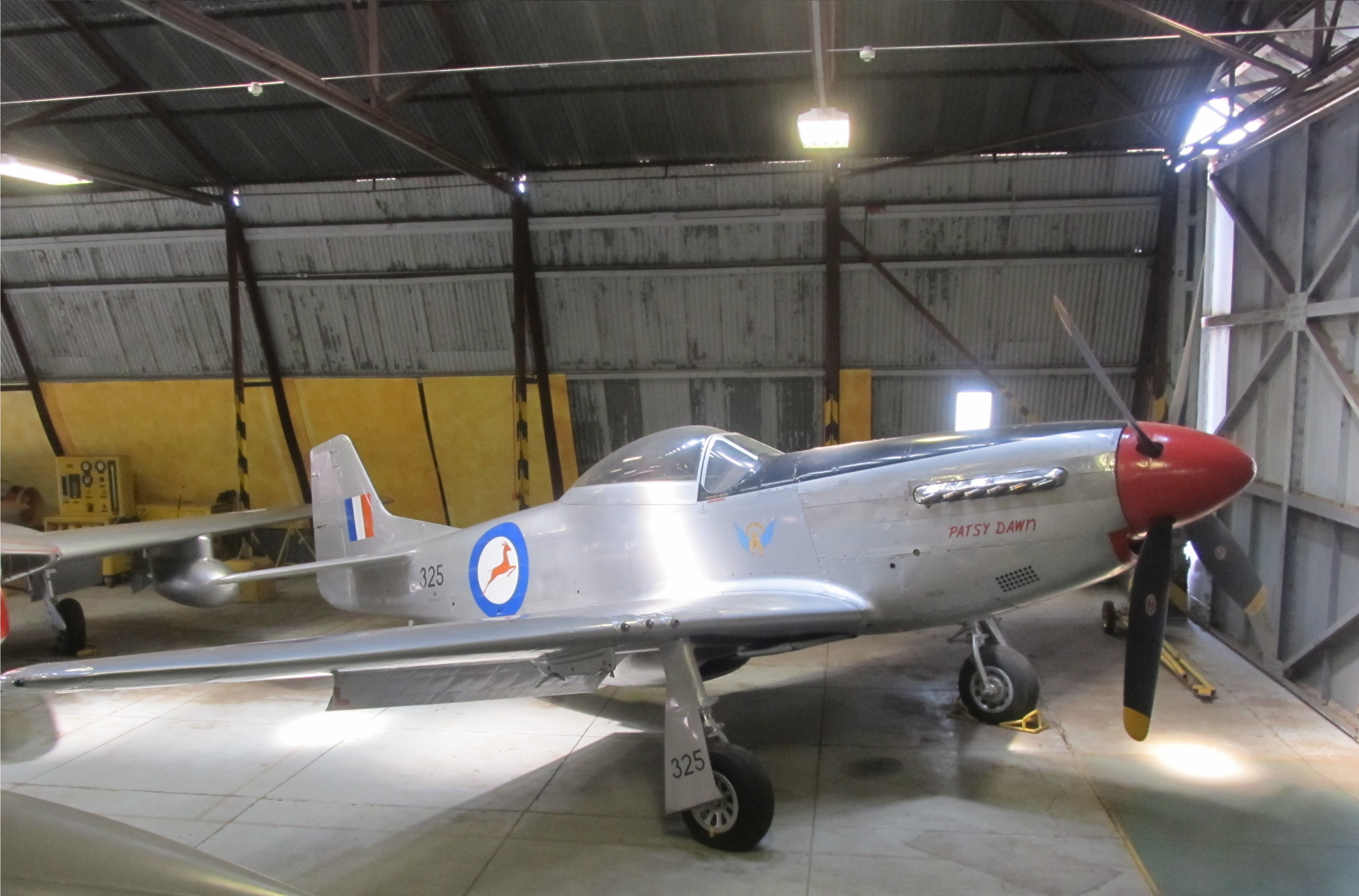
SAAF North American P-51 Mustang at Swartkop

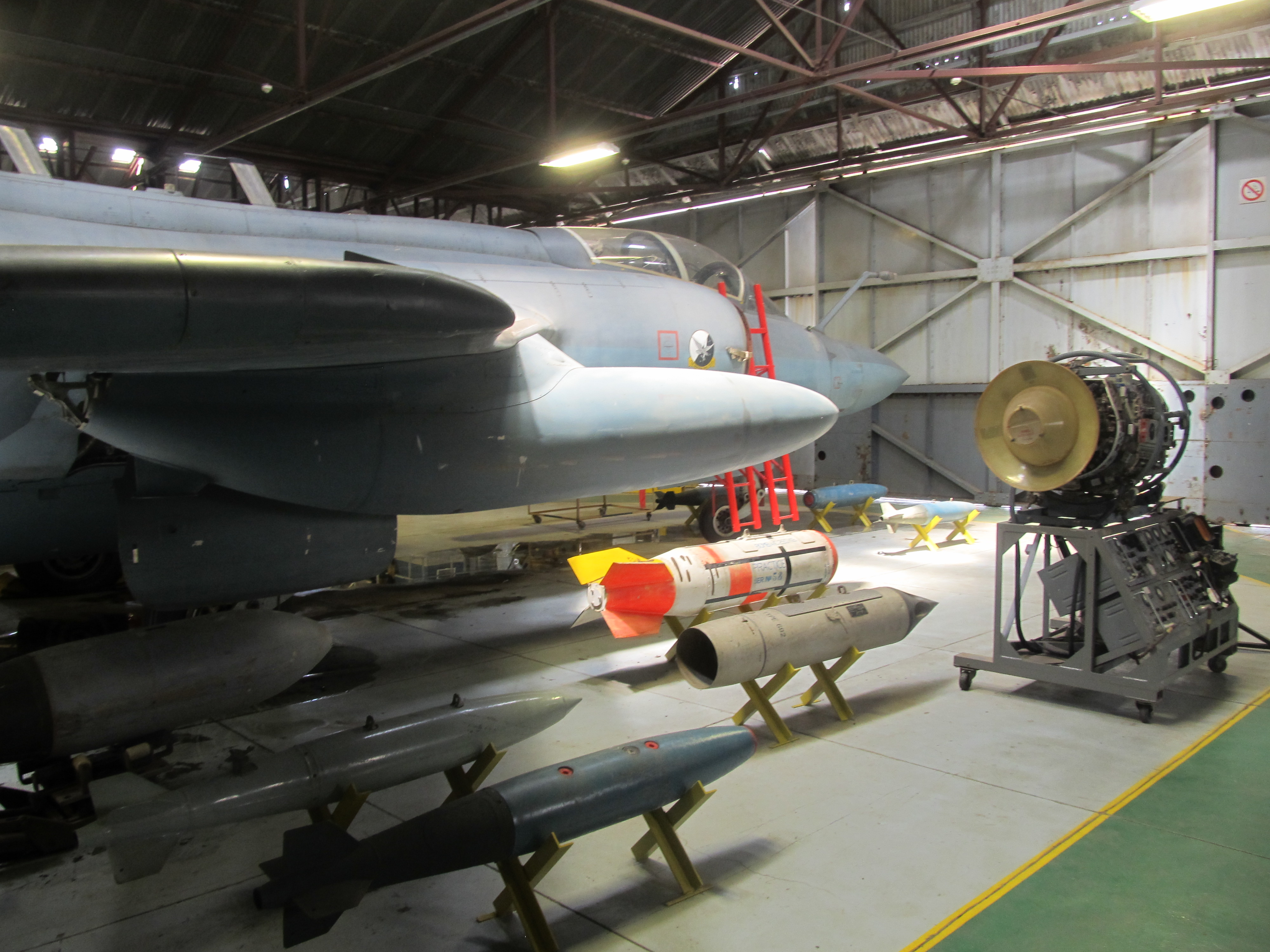
SAAF Blackburn Buccaneer on static display at Swartkop with munition loadout and its Blue Parrot radar system

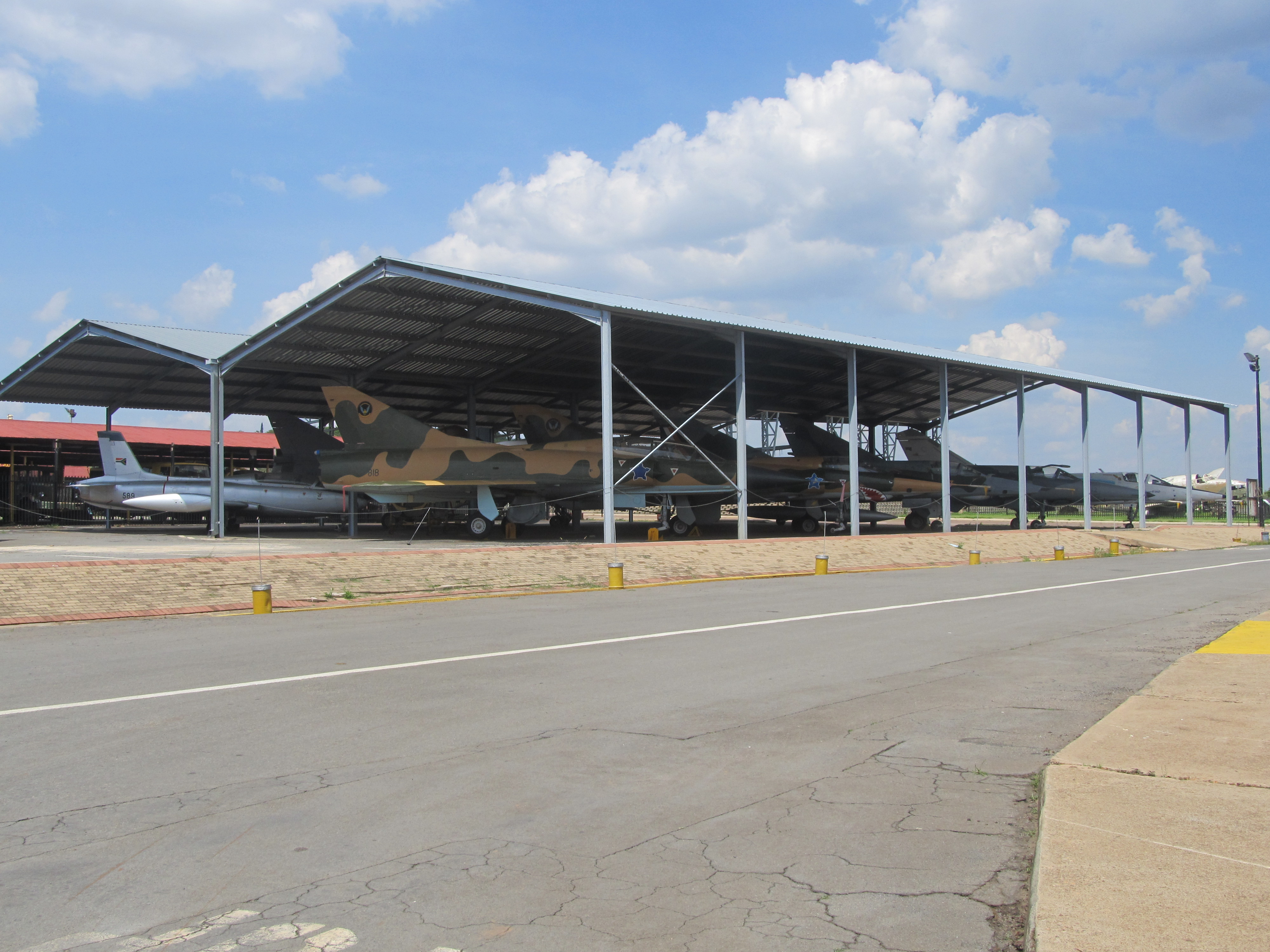
SAAF fighter aircraft on static display at Swartkop

Aircraft on display

- Aerospatiale Alouette III
- Aerospatiale Puma
- Aerospatiale Super Frelon
- Atlas Cheetah E
- Atlas Cheetah C
- Atlas Impala Mk.I
- Atlas Impala Mk.II
- Atlas XH-1 Alpha
- Avro Anson
- Avro Shackleton
- Blackburn Buccaneer
- Boeing 707
- Canadair CL-13
- de Havilland Hornet Moth
- de Havilland Vampire
- Douglas DC-4
- Dassault Mirage III BZ
- Dassault Mirage III CZ
- Dassault Mirage III RZ
- English Electric Canberra T Mk.4
- Fieseler Storch
- Lockheed Ventura
- Mirage F1 AZ
- North American Harvard
- North American Mustang
- Patchen Explorer
- Paterson Biplane
- Pilatus PC-7 Mk.II
- Westland Wasp

=== AFB Ysterplaat ===
AFB Ysterplaat is home to the last airworthy Avro Shackleton. The Shackleton has been grounded for several years already though, as there is no qualified aircrew and the remaining airframe hours are insufficient to train new crew, apart from the obvious concern of preservation of this historic aircraft.

The Douglas C-47 Dakota here, is the aircraft used in 1952 by the SAAF to help Professor J. L. B. Smith acquire a coelacanth fish specimen from the Comoros Islands.

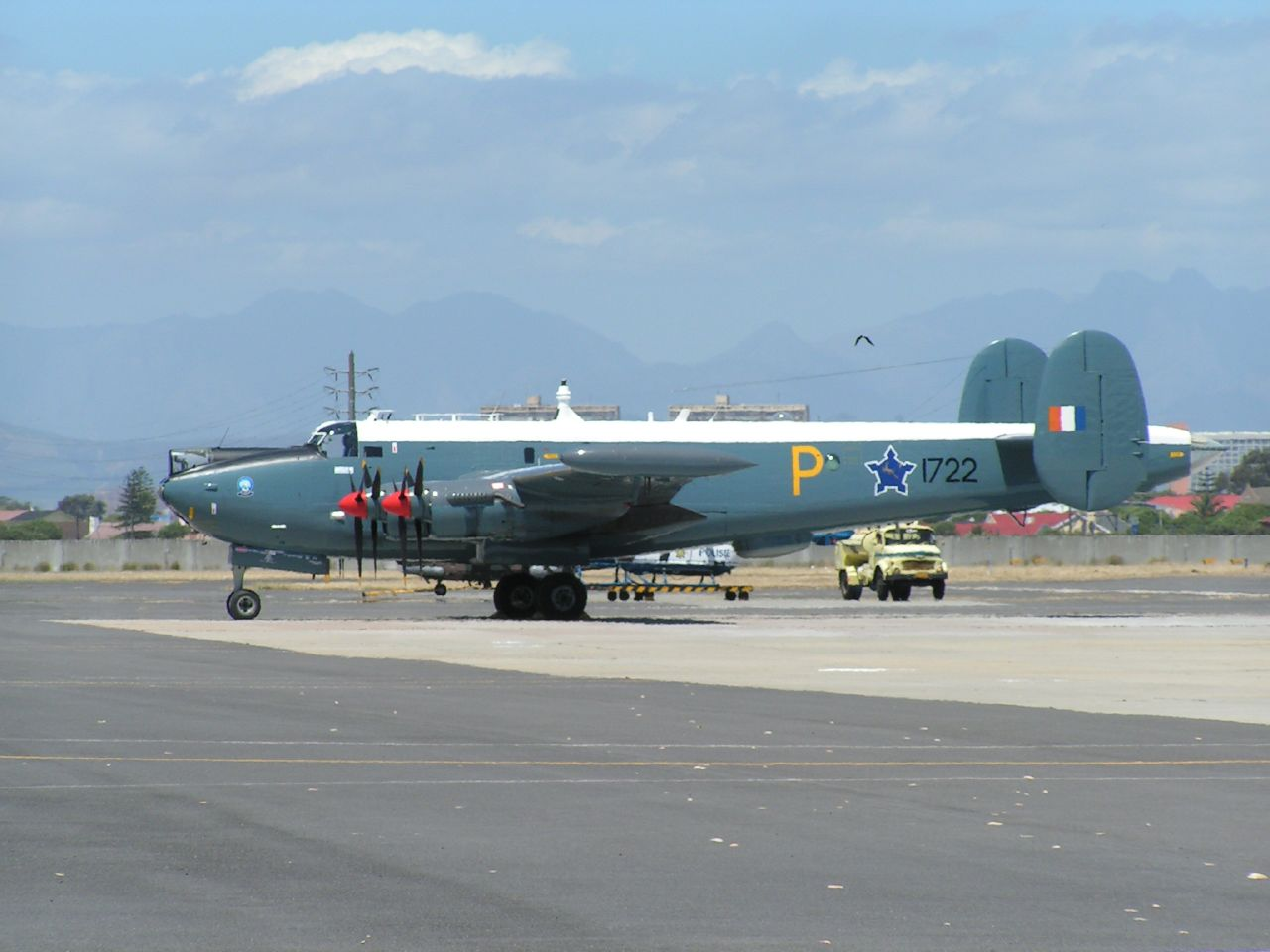
Shackleton 1722 at Ysterplaat

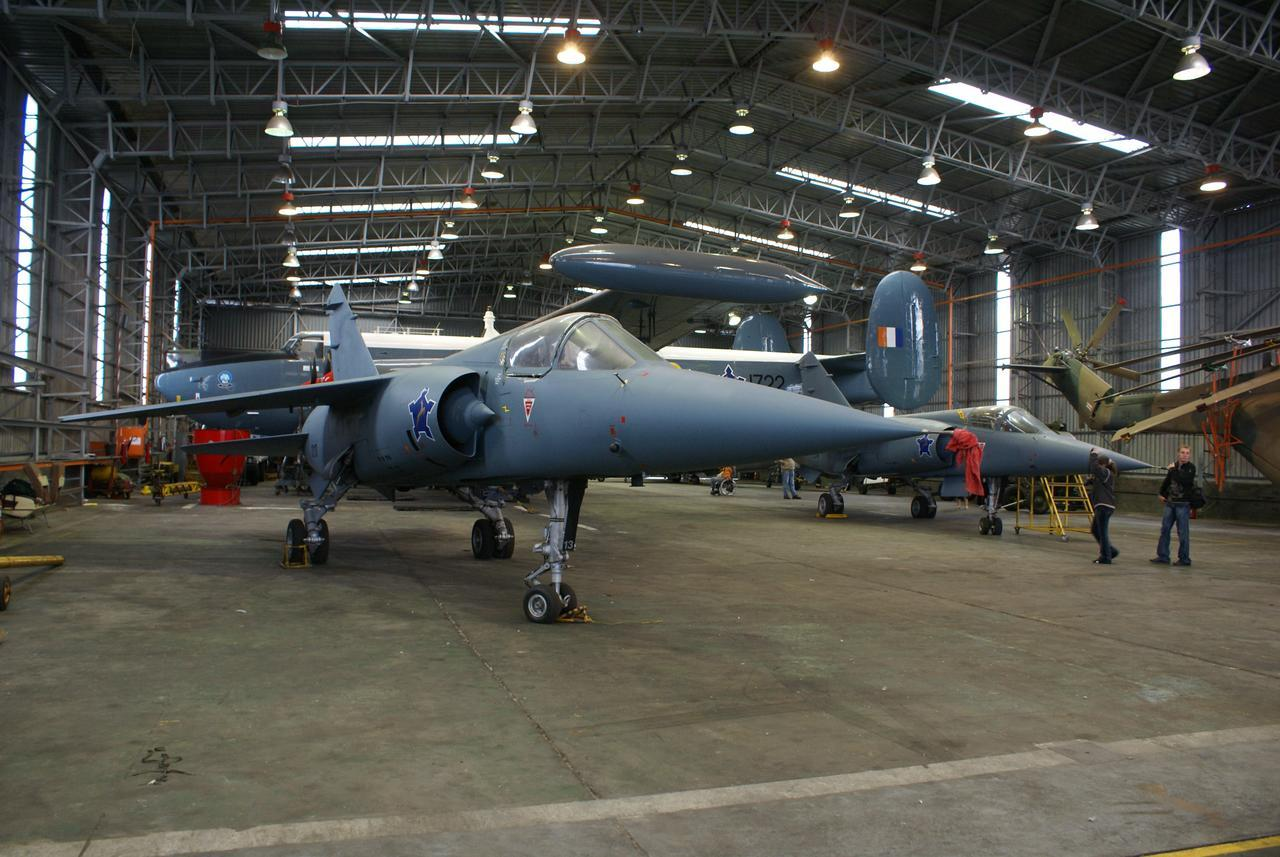
Mirage F1 at Ysterplaat

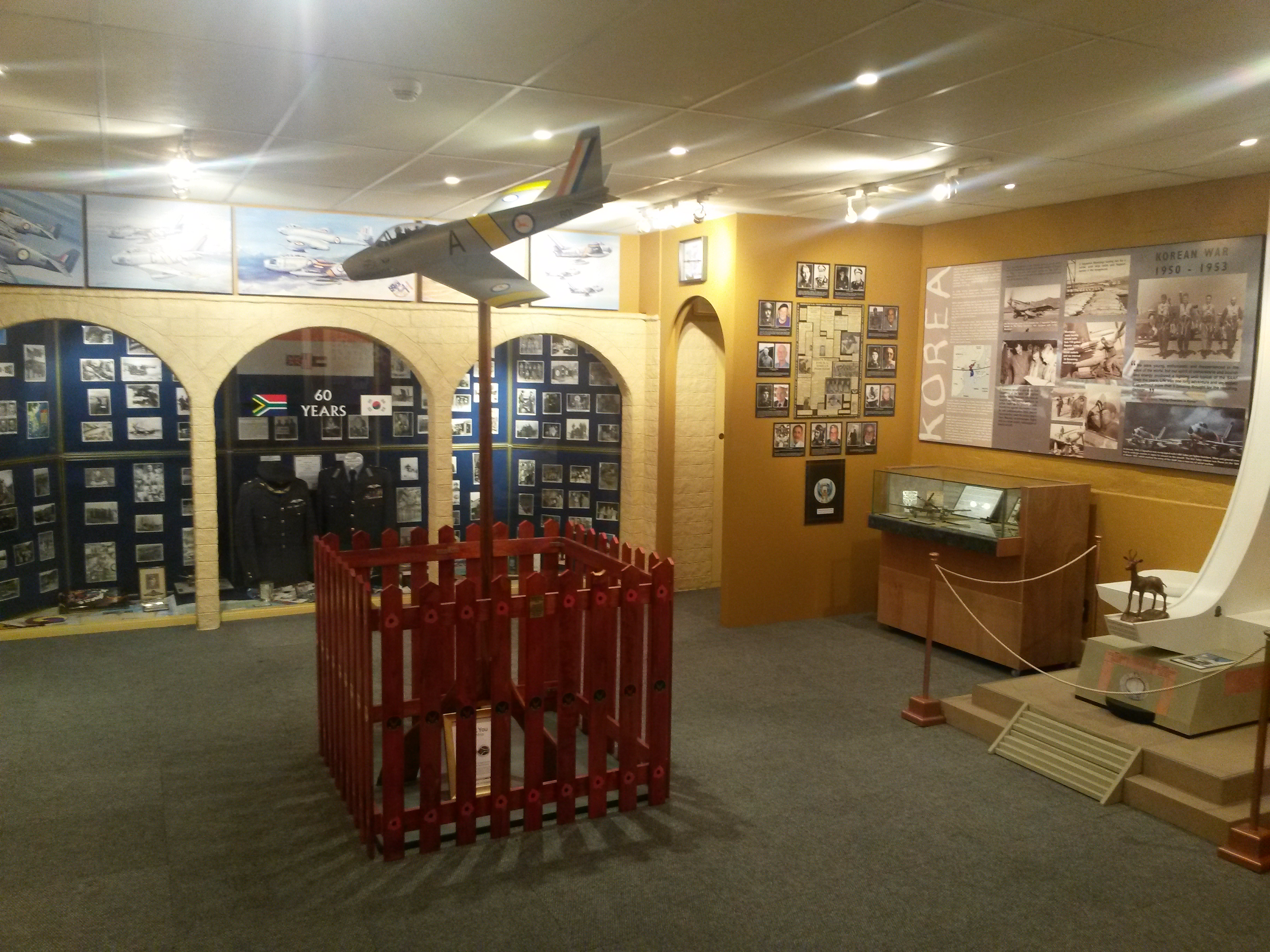
Display at Ysterplaat

Aircraft on display

- Aerospatiale Alouette III
- Aerospatiale Super Frelon
- Atlas Impala Mk.I
- Avro Shackleton
- Blackburn Buccaneer
- Canadair CL-13 Sabre
- Dassault Mirage F1 CZ
- Dassault Mirage III R2Z
- de Havilland Vampire
- Douglas C-47
- Lockheed Ventura
- North American Harvard
- Piaggio P.166
- Sikorsky S-55
- Westland Wasp

=== Gqeberha ===
There are few exhibits at the Chief Dawid Stuurman International Airport branch of the museum because of the limited hangar space available.

Static exhibits are housed in the original 42-Air School Air Gunnery Training Centre used during the Joint Air Training Scheme in World War II.

Aircraft on display

- Aerospatiale Alouette III
- Aerospatiale Puma
- Atlas Impala Mk.II
- Mirage F1 CZ
- North American Harvard
- de Havilland Vampire
- Westland Wasp
- Supermarine Spitfire 1:1 Scale model built out of wood.

Active restoration is being performed on a number of North American Harvards and there is a project to restore an Airspeed Oxford. One of the more unusual exhibits is a Jorg IV Skimmerfoil ground-effect craft.

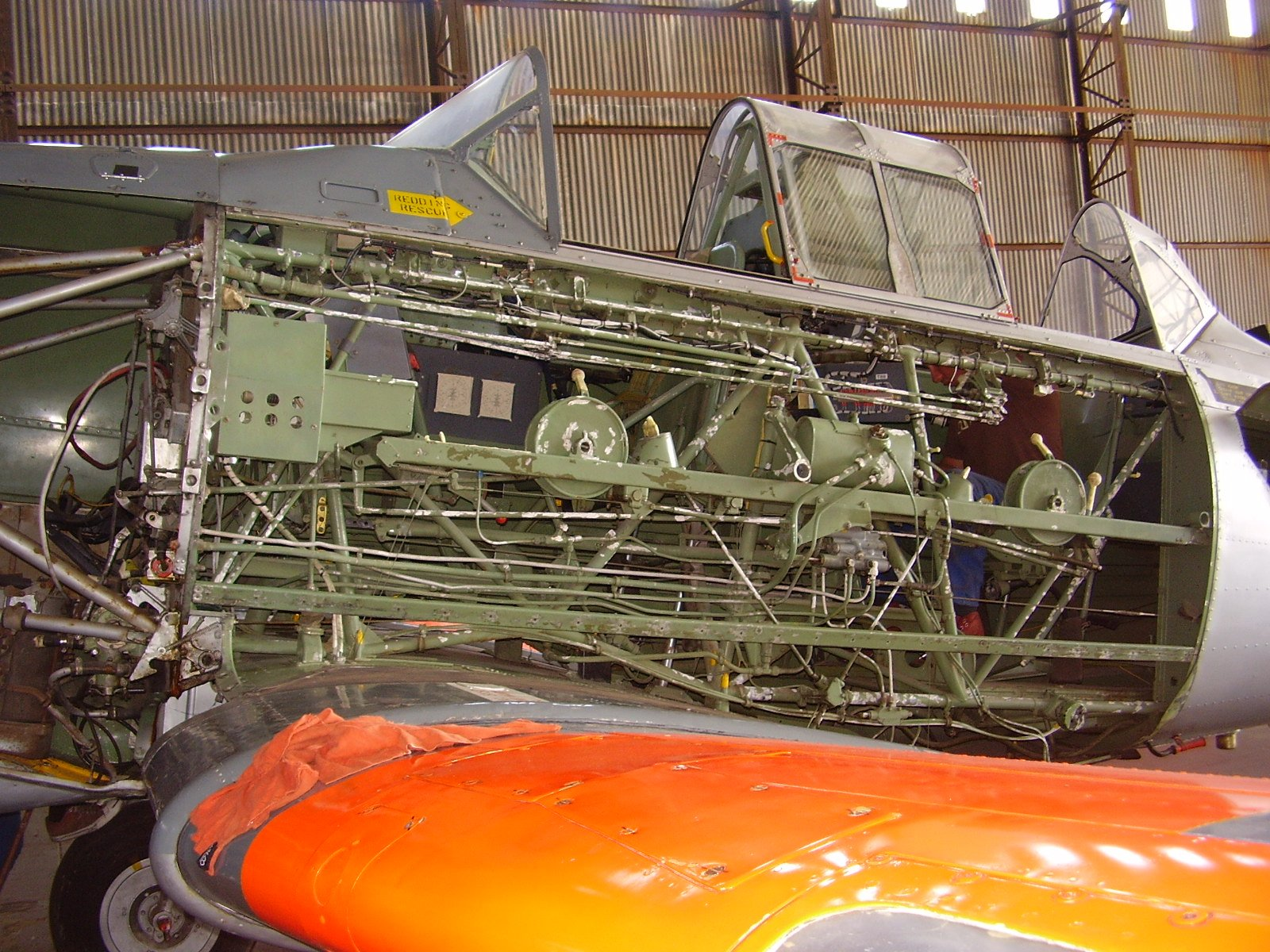
North American Harvard undergoing restoration

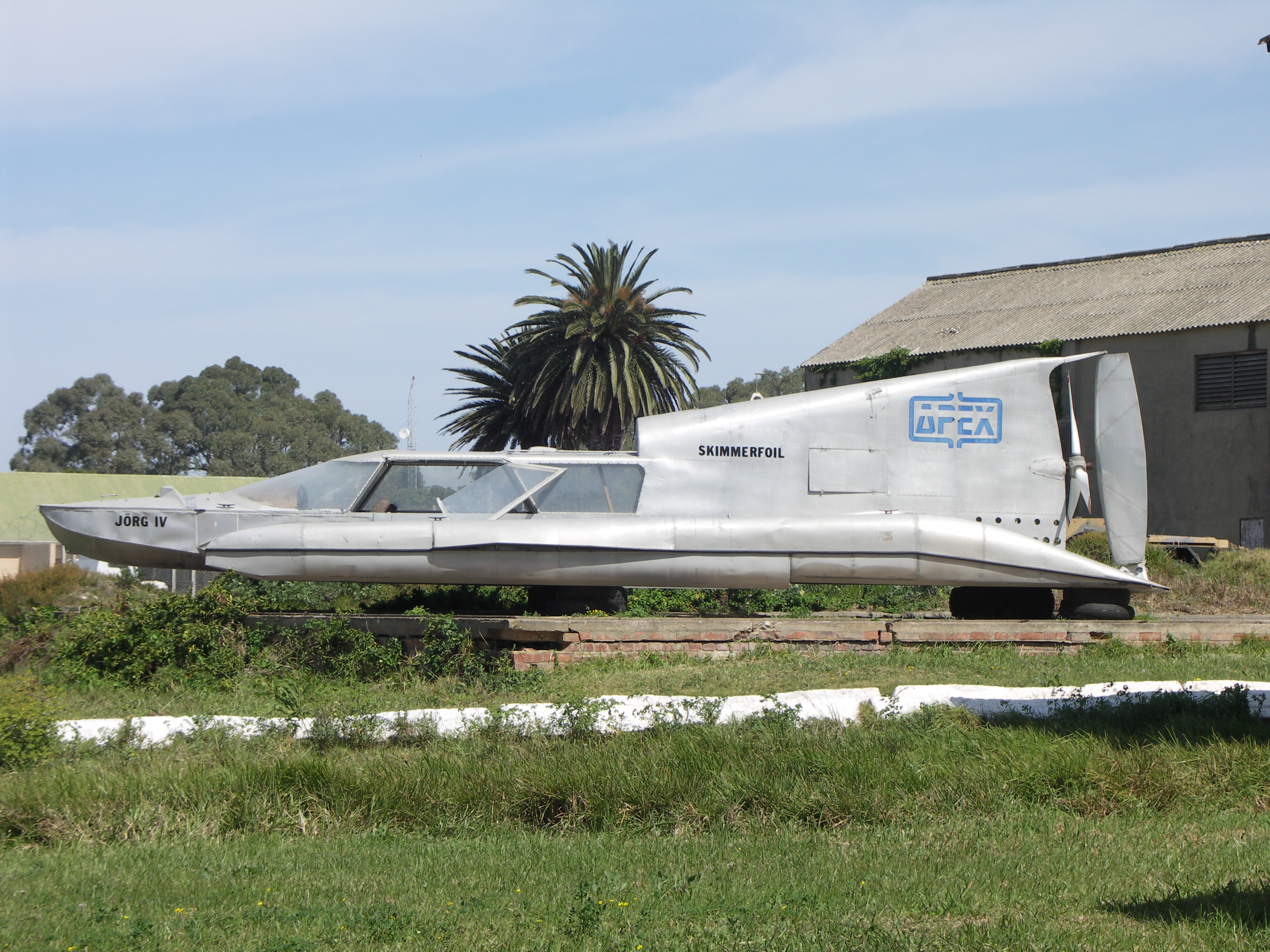
Skimmerfoil Jorg IV

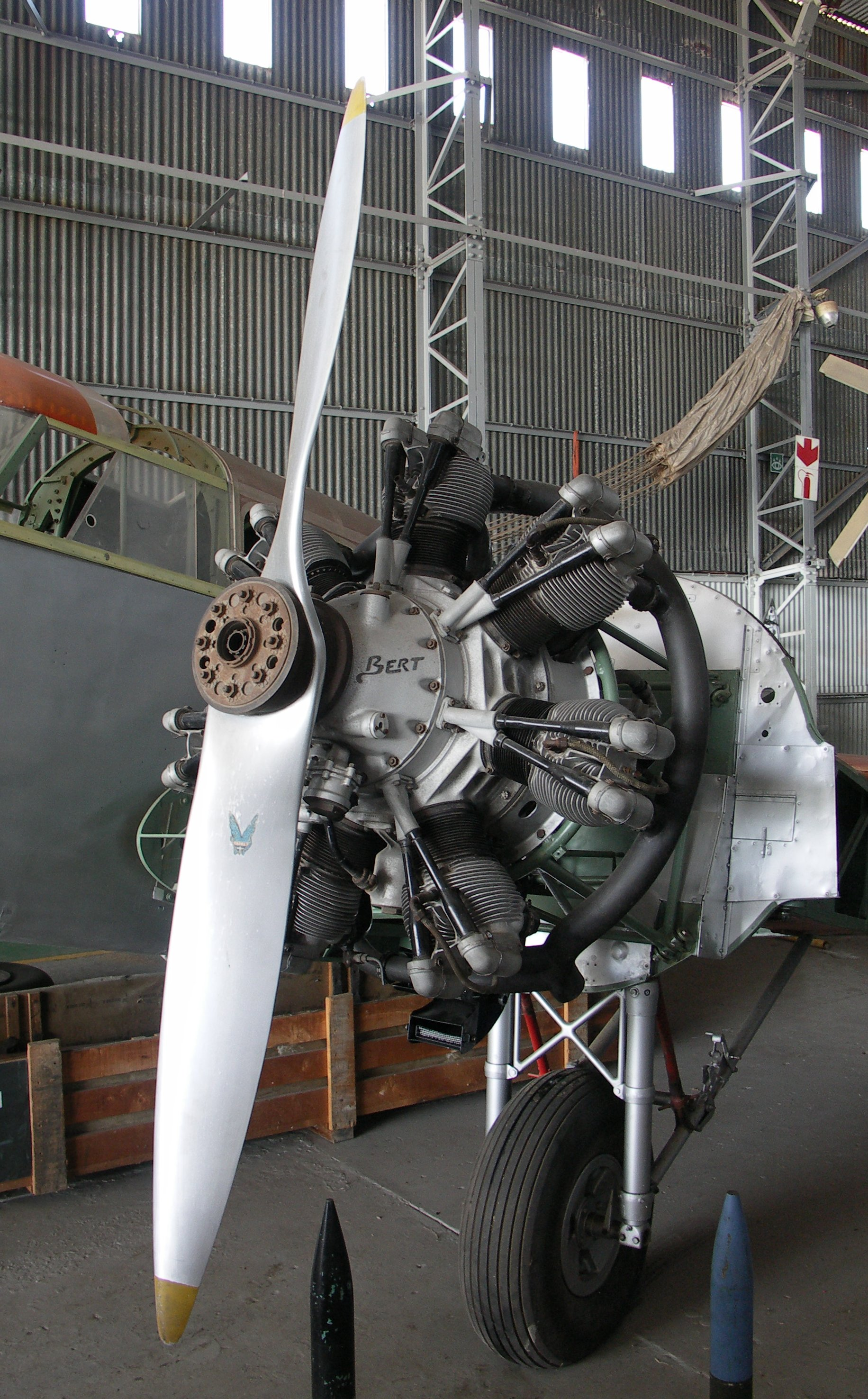
Airspeed Oxford restoration project

== See also ==
- List of aerospace museums
- Military history of South Africa
- South African Air Force
- South African National Museum of Military History
- South African Naval Museum
- AFB Swartkop
