= List of 48 Hour Film Project award winners =

This is a list of films that won awards at the American 48 Hour Film Festival.

Contents

2001 - 2002 - 2003 - 2004 - 2005 - 2006 - 2007 - 2008 - 2009 - 2010 - 2011 - 2012 - 2022 -

== 2001 ==
No awards were given for the festival's inaugural year.

== 2002 ==
The winners of the 2002 48 Hour Film Project were announced at Filmapalooza 2003, held at Goethe-Institut Washington in Washington, DC, in February 2003.

- Best Film - "White Bitch Down" by Boondogglers (United States) Atlanta, Georgia
  - Runner Up for Best Film: "Child Prodigies: Where Are They Now?" by Team Feckless (United States) Philadelphia, Pennsylvania

== 2003 ==
The winners of the 2003 48 Hour Film Project were announced at Filmapalooza 2004, held at the SXSW Film Festival in Austin, Texas, on March 13, 2004.

- Best Film - "Baggage" by Slapdash Films (United States) Los Angeles, California
  - First Runner Up for Best Film - "The Face: The Movie" by Cake (United States) Philadelphia, Pennsylvania
  - Second Runner Up for Best Film - "Special Crime Unit" by Lazy Racer Auckland, New Zealand

== 2004 ==
The winners of the 2004 48 Hour Film Project were announced at Filmapalooza 2005, held at the Cinequest Film Festival in San Jose, California, on March 12, 2005.

- Best Film - "Moved" by Nice Hat Productions (United States) Atlanta, Georgia
  - Runner Up for Best Film: "AndyMan" by Faceworker/Rupert Road (United Kingdom) Sheffield, England

== 2005 ==
The winners of the 2005 48 Hour Film Project were announced at Filmapalooza 2006, held at the Anno Domini in San Jose, California, on March 11, 2006.

- Best Film - "Mimes on the Prairie" by Team Last to Enter (United States) Des Moines, Iowa
  - First Runner Up for Best Film: "The Write Stuff" by ScatterShot (United States) San Francisco, California
  - Second Runner Up for Best Film: "Les Champignons de Paname" ("The Mushrooms of Paris") by Blue Turtles from Paris Paris, France
- Best Film from the Panasonic HD Filmmakers Showdown: "Multiverse" by WIT Films (United States) Washington, DC. The grand prize was an HVX200 HD camera.

== 2006 ==
The winners of the 2006 48 Hour Film Project were announced at Filmapalooza 2007, held at Sauce in Albuquerque, New Mexico, on March 10, 2007.

- Best Film - "Tooth and Nail" by Cinema Syndicate (United States) Portland, Oregon
  - First Runner Up for Best Film - "Manquer" by Milk (United States) Seattle, Washington
  - Second Runner Up for Best Film - "Maten al Payaso" by Afafas (United States) Miami, Florida
- Best Directing - "Caramba!" by Artnum Paris, France
- Best Acting - "Doughboy, Beware" by Biscuits and Gravy (United States) Los Angeles, California
- Best Script - "Tooth and Nail" by Cinema Syndicate (United States) Portland, Oregon
- Best Cinematography - "Manquer" by Milk (United States) Seattle, Washington
- Best Editing - "Stairwell C" by Vaughn Juares (United States) Minneapolis, Minnesota
- Best Film from the Fall Shootout - "Tipparinos" by Vaughn Juares (United States) Minneapolis, Minnesota
- Best Film from the Panasonic HD Filmmaker Showdown - "Maestro" by Bargain Basement Films (United States) Baltimore, Maryland

== 2007 ==
The winners of the 2007 48 Hour Film Project were announced at Filmapalooza 2008, held at Camera 12 in San Jose, California, on March 2, 2008.

- Best Film - "TimeCatcher" by No Budget Productions Tel Aviv, Israel
  - First Runner Up for Best Film - "Dòn" by La Lumiere Soudaine Rome, Italy
  - Second Runner Up for Best Film - "Sweetie" by Trifecta+ Entertainment (United States) Albuquerque, New Mexico
- Best Directing - "TimeCatcher" by No Budget Productions (United States) Tel Aviv, Israel
- Best Acting - "Dòn" by La Lumiere Soudaine Rome, Italy and "Sweetie" by Trifecta+ Entertainment (United States) Albuquerque, New Mexico (tie)
- Best Script - "TimeCatcher" by No Budget Productions Tel Aviv, Israel
- Best Cinematography - "Room 303" by Team KC Amsterdam, Netherlands
- Best Editing - "TimeCatcher" by No Budget Productions (United States) Tel Aviv, Israel
- Best Film from the Panasonic HD Filmmaker Showdown - "Lizzie Strata" by Integral Arts (United States) Washington, DC

== 2008 ==
The winners of the 2008 48 Hour Film Project were announced at Filmapalooza 2009, held at the Tower Theater in Miami, Florida, on March 14, 2009.

- Best Film - "Transfert" by FatCat Films Paris, France
  - First Runner Up for Best Film - "An Old Scam" by Ha'amoraim (United States) Tel Aviv, Israel
  - Second Runner Up for Best Film - "Aidan 5" by Jakson (United States) Columbus, Ohio
- Honorable Mention for Best Film: "Backwoods" by Studio Bib Simmons (United States) Milwaukee, Wisconsin
- Best Directing - "An Old Scam" by Ha'amoraim Tel Aviv, Israel
- Best Acting - "An Old Scam" by Ha'amoraim Tel Aviv, Israel
- Best Screenplay - "An Old Scam" by Ha'amoraim Tel Aviv, Israel
- Best Cinematography - "Transfert" by FatCat Films Paris, France
- Best Editing - "An Old Scam" by Ha'amoraim Tel Aviv, Israel
- Best Film from the International Shootout - "Buying Time" by Half Baked Melbourne, Australia. The grand prize was $1,000.
  - Runner Up for Best Film from the International Shootout - "A Darling Time in Vegas" by Vegaswood (United States) Las Vegas, Nevada
  - Second Runner Up for Best Film from the International Shootout - "Go Human" by Par-t-com Productions (United States) Los Angeles, California
- Best Film from the Panasonic HD Filmmaker Showdown - "Quillions" by More Where That Came From (United States) Denver, Colorado. The grand prize was a Panasonic HPX170 HD camera.

== 2009 ==
The winners of the 2009 48 Hour Film Project were announced at Filmapalooza 2010, held at the Las Vegas Hilton in Las Vegas, Nevada, on April 12, 2010. The grand prize for "Best Film" was $3,000.

- Best Film - "Nicht nur der Himmel ist blau" by Sharktankcleaners Berlin, Germany
  - Runner Up for Best Film - "The Grave Review" by Rascallion Media Group (United States) Minneapolis, Minnesota
  - Second Runner Up for Best Film - "Rationed" by Vegan Cannibal Productions (United States) Inland Empire, California
- Best Directing - "Regenmakers" by Stichting DuS Breda, Netherlands
- Best Writing - "Geen zin" by Zin in een film.nl Utrecht, Netherlands
  - Honorable Mention for Best Writing - "Don't Forget the Milk" by Wax Idiotical Films (United States) Providence, Rhode Island
- Best Acting - "11" by Blind Mice Athens, Greece
- Best Cinematography - "Piccadilly High Noon" by Liminal (United Kingdom) London, England
- Best Editing - "Ehsaas" by Time Travel Mumbai, India
- Best Special Effects - "Gwendolyn Dangerous and the Great Space Rescue" by Integral Arts (United States) Washington, D.C.
- Best Film from the International Shootout - "Prebloc" by Bande a part Paris, France
- Best Film from the Panasonic HD Filmmaker Showdown - "Who's the Fairest" by Rascallion Media Group (United States) Minneapolis, Minnesota. The grand prize was a Panasonic HD camera.

== 2010 ==
The winners of the 2010 48 Hour Film Project were announced at Filmapalooza 2011, held at the Tower Theater in Miami, Florida, on March 12, 2011. The grand prize for "Best Film" was $3,000.

- Best Film - "The Girl Is Mime" by Far From Home (United Kingdom) London, England.
  - First Runner Up for Best Film - "46 Miles" by Cinema Geeks (United States) Denver, Colorado
  - Second Runner Up for Best Film - "Casting Call" by Evolve Productions (United States) Los Angeles, California
- Best Directing - "The Girl Is Mime" by Far From Home (United Kingdom) London, England
  - Honorable Mention for Directing - "Gesti" by Gadoev Rome, Italy
- Best Writing - "46 Miles" by Cinema Geeks (United States) Denver, Colorado
  - Honorable Mention for Writing - "Casting Call" by Evolve Productions (United States) Los Angeles, California
- Best Acting - "Casting Call" by Evolve Productions (United States) Los Angeles, California
  - Honorable Mention for Acting - "The Girl Is Mime" by Far From Home (United Kingdom) London, England
- Best Cinematography - "The Girl Is Mime" by Far From Home (United Kingdom) London, England
  - Honorable Mention for Cinematography - "Gesti" by Gadoev Rome, Italy
- Best Editing - "Gesti" by Gadoev Rome, Italy
  - Honorable Mention for Editing - "Casting Call" by Evolve Productions (United States) Los Angeles, California

== 2011 ==
The winners of the 2011 48 Hour Film Project were announced at Filmapalooza 2012, held at the Taos Center for the Arts in Taos, New Mexico, on March 4, 2012. The grand prize for "Best Film" was $3,000.

- Best Film - "In Captivity" by Jpixx Films (United States) Hampton Roads, Virginia
  - Runner Up for Best Film - "My Darling, I'm So Sorry" by so36portraits Berlin, Germany
  - Second Runner Up for Best Film - "Canh Ba Ba" by Yeti Ho Chi Minh City, Vietnam
- Best Directing - "My Darling, I'm So Sorry" by so36portraits Berlin, Germany
  - Honorable Mention for Directing - "In Captivity" by Jpixx Films (United States) Hampton Roads, Virginia
- Best Writing - "My Darling, I'm So Sorry" by so36portraits Berlin, Germany
  - Honorable Mention for Writing - "Canh Ba Ba" by Yeti Ho Chi Minh City, Vietnam
- Best Acting (Ensemble) - "Casse gueule" by Collectif 109 Paris, France
- Best Acting (Individual) - Jason Perini in "A Little Bit Behind" by The Magnificent New South Wales, Australia
- Best Cinematography - "Page 23" by Arts, Houben & Van Den Boogaard Utrecht, Netherlands
- Best Editing - "In Captivity" by Jpixx Films (United States) Hampton Roads, Virginia
- Best Use of Line - "My Darling, I'm So Sorry" by so36portraits Berlin, Germany
- Best Special Effects - "In Captivity" by Jpixx Films (United States) Hampton Roads, Virginia
- Best Song - "Oh Drama" by White Poison Industries (United States) Des Moines, Iowa
- Best Graphics - "Page 23" by Arts, Houben & Van Den Boogaard Utrecht, Netherlands

== 2012 ==
The winners of the 2012 48 Hour Film Project were announced at Filmapalooza 2013, held at the TCL Chinese Theatre in Hollywood, California, on March 10, 2013.

- Best Film - "Jacques Serres" by Les Productions avec Volontiers - directors François Goetghebeur & Nicolas Lebrun Paris, France
  - First Runner Up for Best Film - "Les Dernières Marches" by Les Loups blancs Lyon, France
  - Second Runner Up for Best Film - "Past.Tense" by Bench Films Cape Town, South Africa
- Best Directing - "Jacques Serres" by Les Productions avec Volontiers - directors François Goetghebeur & Nicolas Lebrun Paris, France
- Best Writing - "Jacques Serres" by Les Productions avec Volontiers - directors François Goetghebeur & Nicolas Lebrun Paris, France
- Best Cinematography - "Les Dernières Marches" by Les Loups blancs Lyon, France and "Jacques Serres" by Les Productions avec Volontiers - directors François Goetghebeur & Nicolas Lebrun Paris, France (tie)
- Best Acting (Ensemble) - "Sorry" by Jeroen Houben Rotterdam, Netherlands
- Best Acting (Female Lead) - Katerina Pindejovà in "Main Course" by Laska Prague, Czech Republic
- Best Acting (Male Lead) - Doug Powell in "Welcome to the Neighborhood" by Star Wipe Films (United States) Baltimore, Maryland
- Best Choreography - "The Crossing" by B & C (United States) Los Angeles, California
- Best Graphics - "Eleven 0 One" by Stranger Studios (United States) Denver, Colorado
- Best Sound Design - "Advancing Age" by The Big Honkin' (United States) Washington, DC
- Best Musical - "GoodNewsBurningFire: The Musical" by Little Earth Productions (United Kingdom) Dundee, Scotland
- Best Editing - "Les Dernières Marches" by Les Loups blancs Lyon, France
  - Best Special Effects - "Until Death" by Flip Eleven Creative (United States) Milwaukee, Wisconsin
- Best Use of Line - "Where Sheep May Safely Graze" by Trinidad Mustache Films (United States) Albuquerque, New Mexico
- Best Use of Prop - "The Pillow-Case" by Guerilla Film Crew (United Arab Emirates) Dubai, UAE and "Main Course" by Laska Prague, Czech Republic
- Best Use of Character - "Welcome to the Neighborhood" by Star Wipe Films (United States) Baltimore, Maryland
- Best Music Video - "Past Scenes" by Facades with Woow Your Life Paris, France
- Best Song - "Shut the Door" by Songs of Aran with FMV Nijmegen, Netherlands

== 2021 ==
The winners of the 2021 48 Hour Film Project were announced at Rich Mix 2021, held at the Rich Mix cinema in London, UK, on November 27, 2021.

- Best Film - "I'm in Love with my Stalker" by Invisible Sword Productions - Director David John Jeffery (United Kingdom) London, UK
