= Taylor Zakhar Perez =

American actor (born 1991)

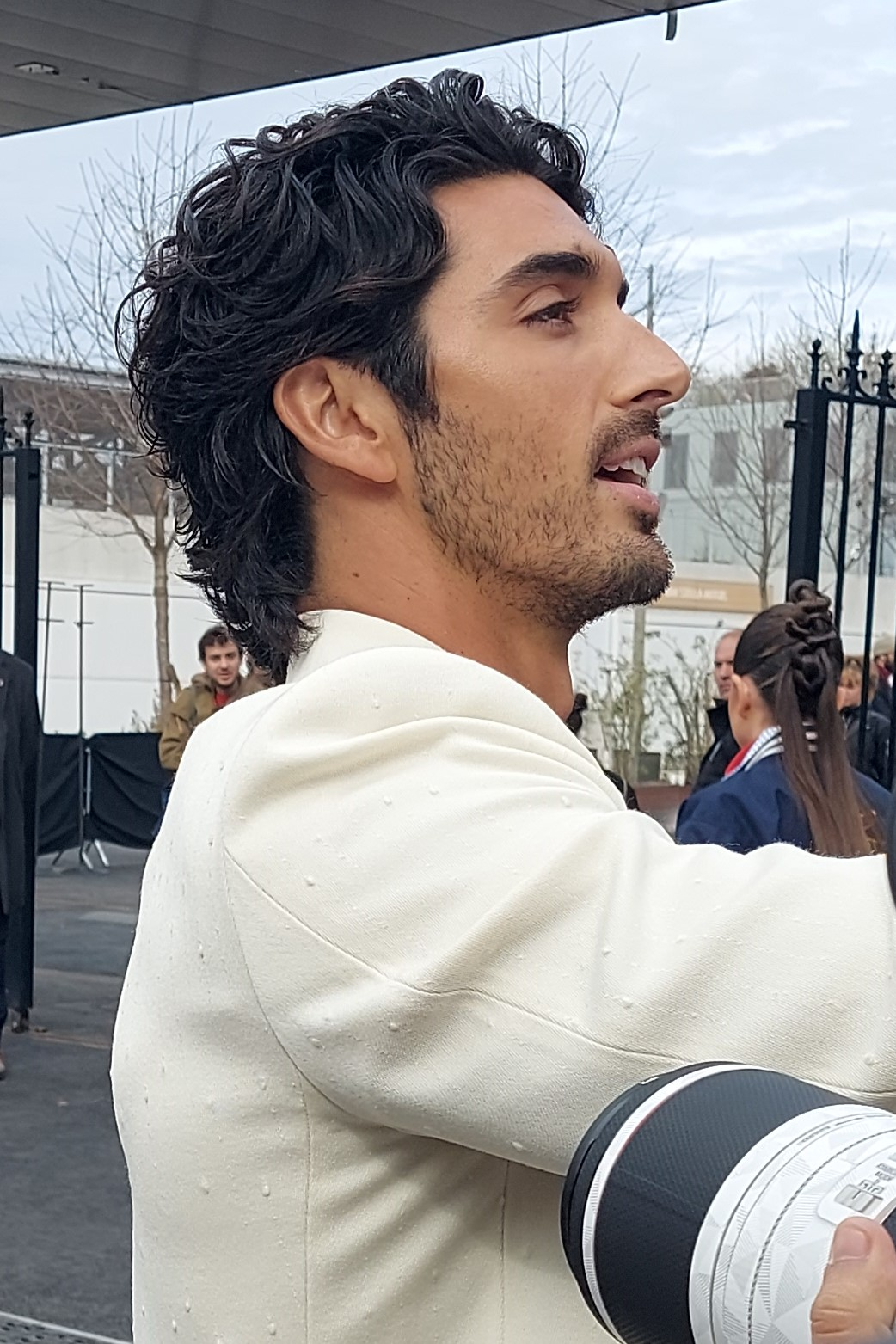
- Perez in 2025
- Born: Taylor James Zakhar; December 24, 1991 (age 34); Chicago, Illinois, U.S.
- Education: University of California, Los Angeles (BA)
- Occupation: Actor
- Years active: 2012–present

Taylor Zakhar Perez (born Taylor James Zakhar; December 24, 1991) is an American actor. He began his career by appearing in several series, before his breakthrough role in the romantic comedy films The Kissing Booth 2 (2020) and The Kissing Booth 3 (2021). Perez had a supporting role in the sex comedy series Minx (2022) and a starring role in the romantic comedy film Red, White & Royal Blue (2023).

== Early life ==
Perez was born in Chicago on December 24, 1991, and grew up in Chesterton, Indiana. He attended Chesterton High School and he has been a national level swimmer. Perez has a diverse ancestry, ranging from Mexican and Middle Eastern to Mediterranean. He is partially Croatian through his mother and partially Hungarian through his father.

His mother is an aesthetician and he is the sixth of eight children. Perez used to change tires at the family auto-body shop on weekends. When he received a swimming scholarship to Fordham University, he turned it down to attend UCLA, where he majored in Spanish culture and community and minored in film and television. Perez started off his acting career by performing at musicals in opera houses at an early age.

== Career ==
=== Beginnings and breakthrough (2012–2023) ===
After a series of television guest roles since 2012, Perez starred as Marco Valentin Peña in Netflix's The Kissing Booth 2 in 2020. For his role, he took choreography and guitar lessons. It became the most-streamed film on Netflix during its opening weekend. The series was the second most streamed during its second weekend, with Forbes noting it as "one of the most popular movies ever on the platform." In October that year, Netflix reported that 66 million households watched the film over its first four weeks of release.

At the start of the COVID-19 pandemic, Perez partnered with Variant Malibu, a 3D tech company to make face masks. They cut 90% of traditional manufacturing waste. He also designed masks with The Kissing Booth 2 co-stars Joel Courtney, Joey King, Meganne Young and Maisie Richardson-Sellers. The proceeds went to a Chicago organisation that helps disabled kids, adults and families with disabled kids in the Hispanic community. In 2021, Perez reprised the role of Marco Valentin Peña in The Kissing Booth 3.

In 2022, Perez starred in HBO Max's comedy series Minx as Shane Brody, a firefighter who becomes the frontrunner for debut-issue cover star of the first erotic magazine for women in Los Angeles. Talking about the challenges he faced playing the character, Perez said, "The biggest thing was grounding him, making him likable, and also playing against the line." Perez went on to star in gaming comedy film 1Up alongside Ruby Rose where he played Dustin.

In 2023, Perez starred in Amazon Prime Video's Red, White & Royal Blue as Alex Claremont-Diaz, the first son of the United States, opposite Nicholas Galitzine. The film was released on August 11. For the first three weeks after its release, it was the top watched film worldwide on the platform. The Observer's Wendy Ide praised the charisma of Perez and Galitzine and credited it for the film's appeal: "It turns out that watching two impossibly beautiful boys making cow eyes at each other might be just the escapist pulp we need right now." A sequel is in development.

=== 2024–present ===
In February 2024, Perez was appointed the ambassador for that year's SAG Awards ceremony. In March 2024, he signed with talent agency Paradigm. In April 2025, Perez voiced Johnny Stompanato in the Audible audio drama The Big Fix: A Jack Bergin Mystery.

== Other ventures ==
Perez has discussed environmental sustainability and Latin representation in the entertainment industry in interviews. He has participated in supply-chain visits with Eco-Age and The Woolmark Company, an Australian wool industry organization.

In January 2025, Perez was named global brand ambassador for Lacoste, and starred in their new underwear ad campaign.

== Filmography ==
=== Film ===
Year	Title	Role	Notes	Ref.
2014	Alpha House	Trent	Direct-to-video	
2020	The Kissing Booth 2	Marco Valentin Peña		
2021	The Kissing Booth 3	Marco Valentin Peña		
2022	1Up	Dustin		
2023	Red, White & Royal Blue	Alex Claremont-Diaz		
TBA	Red, White & Royal Wedding	Alex Claremont-Diaz	Post-production	

=== Television ===
Year	Title	Role	Notes	Ref.
2012	iCarly	Keith	Episode: "iGet Banned"	
2013	Suburgatory	Renaldo	Episode: "Chinese Chicken"	
2014	Awkward	Hot guy	Episode: "Auld Lang Party"	
2015	Young & Hungry	Benji Rodriguez	Episode: "Young & Oh Brother"	
2016	Code Black	Ari Stricks	Episode: "The Fifth Stage"	
2016	12 Deadly Days	Zac	Episode: "Singers Slaying"	
2016	Cruel Intentions	Mateo De La Vega	Unsold pilot	
2017	Embeds	Noah Torres	Main role	
2017	High Expectasians	Jonathan Price	Episode: "The Audition"	
2018	Scandal	Calvin	Episode: "Army of One"	
2022	Minx	Shane Brody	2 episodes	

=== Podcast ===
Year	Title	Role	Notes	Ref.
2025	The Big Fix: A Jack Bergin Mystery	Jonathan Stompanato	7 episodes	

== Awards and nominations ==
Year	Award	Category	Role	Result	Ref.
2024	Imagen Awards	Best Actor Comedy (Television)	Red, White & Royal Blue	Nominated	
