= Paul Becker =

Canadian choreographer

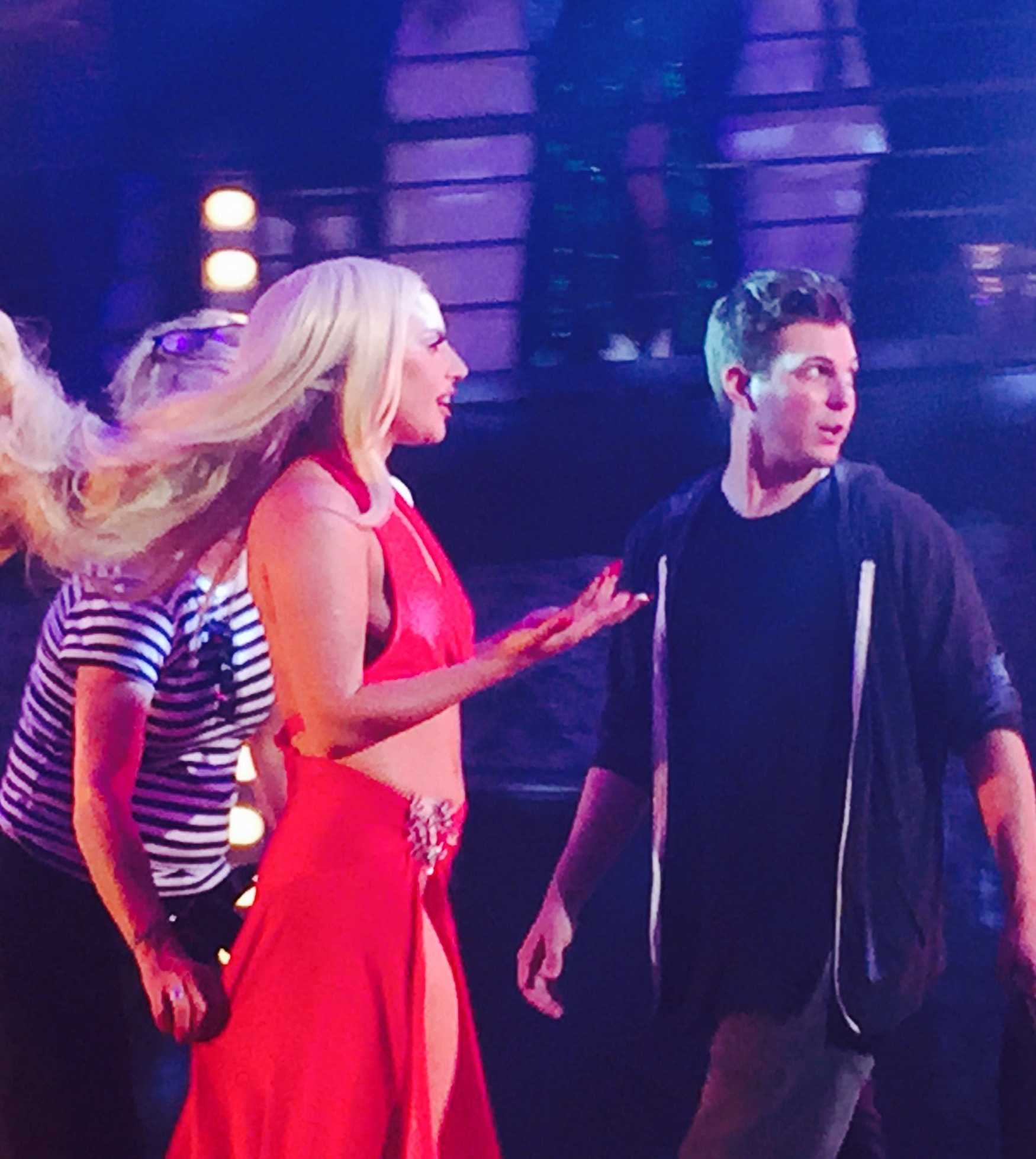
- Becker with Lady Gaga on the set of American Horror Story
- Born: Victoria, British Columbia, Canada
- Occupations: Choreographer, Dancer, Actor, Film Director
- Years active: 1997–present
- Awards: MTV Movie and TV 2021 "Best Musical Number" & Leo Award for Outstanding Choreography in a Motion Picture
- Website: www.paulbecker.ai

Paul Becker is a Canadian director, choreographer, writer, and producer. He is best known for directing, choreographing, co-executive producing, and writing the music for LEGO's Heartlake The Musical. He also created the creature movement for HBO's The Last of Us, and choreographed: Deadpool 2, Disney's Descendants, Mirror Mirror, Twilight, Disney Animation's Ralph Breaks the Internet, and The Kissing Booth, The Kissing Booth 2, The Kissing Booth 3, directing episodes of Julie and the Phantoms, and producing Canada's Got Talent.

== Life and career ==
Paul Becker is a choreographer, director, and producer. He was born in Victoria, British Columbia, and graduated from Spectrum Community School. Becker's career in the entertainment industry began as a dancer in the Academy Award-winning film "Chicago." This experience inspired him to pursue a career as a director and choreographer.

Becker has an extensive body of work in film and television, with over 300 projects to his credit. Some notable examples of his choreography include the 2019 Academy Award-nominated film Ralph Breaks the Internet for Disney Animation, the comedy film Good Boys, produced by Seth Rogan, Deadpool 2, Noelle (with Anna Kendrick and Shirley MacLaine, The Kissing Booth, The Kissing Booth 2, and The Kissing Booth 3, and the musical comedy A Week Away (Netflix). In addition to his work in the musical genre, Becker also served as the series movement choreographer for HBO's The Last of Us, creating and designing the movement for the "infected" and the "Clickers." He has also choreographed for the television shows A Series of Unfortunate Events (Netflix), "Riverdale" (CW Network), Seven seasons for Once Upon a Time, The Magicians, Disney's Prom Pact, Paramount's Honor Society, and American Horror Story: Hotel, among others.

In addition to his work in film and television, Becker has also choreographed music videos, including Michael Buble's "Haven't Met You Yet" and the Jonas Brothers' "Hannah Montana/Miley Cyrus: Best of Both Worlds" tour. He has also served as a judge and choreographer on the Canadian version of So You Think You Can Dance.

In 2015, Becker directed and choreographed the closing ceremonies for the Pan American Games. In addition to his work as a choreographer and director, Becker has also had a successful career as a producer. He served as the producer and creative director for Canada's Got Talent and co-produced the Inaugural Celebration for President Joe Biden. He has also produced Kristin Chenoweth's docu-series 1300 Miles to Broadway directed by Kenny Ortega, was the co-producer on The Disney Family SingaLong on ABC, and the country musical Something Here.

== Film and TV choreography credits ==
- The Last of Us (2023)
- Prom Pact (2023)
- Honor Society (2022)
- Ivy and Bean (2022)
- The Kissing Booth 3 (2021)
- Julie and the Phantoms (2020)
- Ralph Breaks the Internet.
- Deadpool 2 (2018)
- Overboard (2018)
- Dancing with the Stars Season 24
- Haters Back Off (TV series)
- A Series of Unfortunate Events
- American Horror Story HOTEL (2016)
- Once Upon a Time (TV series)
- Adventures in Babysitting (2016)
- Descendants (2015)
- The Twilight Saga: Breaking Dawn – Part 2 (2012)
- The Cabin In the Woods (2012)
- This Means War (2012)
- The Twilight Saga: Breaking Dawn – Part 1 (2011)
- Sucker Punch (2011)
- Diary of a Wimpy Kid: Rodrick Rules (2011)
- Hellcats (2010)
- Sorority Wars (2010)
- Diary of a Wimpy Kid (2010)
- A Muppets Christmas: Letters to Santa (2009)
- Scooby-Doo! The Mystery Begins (2009)
- Reaper (2008)
- The L Word (2008)
- Case 39 (2009)
- My Soul to Take (2009)
- So You Think You Can Dance Canada (2008)
- Vancouver Auditions (Judge)
- Caprica (TV series) (2008)
- Hannah Montana & Miley Cyrus: Best of Both Worlds Concert – The Jonas Brothers choreographer
- The Goods: Live Hard, Sell Hard (2009)
- Aliens in America (2008)
- College Road Trip (2008) – Associate Choreographer
- The Ellen DeGeneres Show (2008)
- American Music Awards (2007) - The Jonas Brothers choreographer
- Hot Rod (2007)
- Are We Done Yet? (2007)
- Talk to Me (2007)
- Code Name: The Cleaner (2007)
- Eragon (2006)
- Don Omar "King of Kings Concert" (2006)
- Deck the Halls (2006)
- Totally Awesome (2006)
- The Wicker Man (2006)
- The Obsession (2006)
- RV (2006)
- Are We There Yet? (2005)
- Tru Calling (2005)

== Acting appearances ==
- Legends of Tomorrow
- Twilight Breaking Dawn
- Muppets "Letters To Santa" (2009)
- Caprica (2008)
- Aliens in America (2008)
- Totally Awesome (2006)
- The Music Man (2003)
- Dark Angel (2002)

== Notable dance credits ==
- Rise of the Pink Ladies (2023)
- Once Upon a Mattress (2005)
- The Music Man (2003)
- Chicago (2002)
- Josie and the Pussycats (2001)
- Life or Something Like It (2001)
