= The Kissing Booth (film series) =

Film series

- Official film series logo
- Based on: The Kissing Booth novels by Beth Reekles
- Starring: Joey King; Jacob Elordi; Joel Courtney; Various actors (See detailed list below)
- Distributed by: Netflix
- Country: United States
- Language: English

The Kissing Booth film series consists of American teen-romantic comedy films developed and released as Netflix original films, exclusively for the streaming service. Based on the novels written by Beth Reekles, the plot centers around Rochelle "Elle" Evans, and the complications that arise when she begins dating her best friend's older brother. The series explores the teenage experiences of high school, popularity, dating, and friendship.

Although it was poorly received by critics, the series as a whole has seen success in its streaming numbers with audiences. Netflix officially identified it as one of its consistently most-viewed releases.

== Film ==
Film	U.S. release date	Directed by	Screenplay by	Produced by
The Kissing Booth	May 11, 2018	Vince Marcello	Vince Marcello	Ed Glauser, Vince Marcello, Michele Weisler & Andrew Cole-Bulgin
The Kissing Booth 2	July 24, 2020	Vince Marcello	Jay Arnold & Vince Marcello	Ed Glauser, Vince Marcello, Michele Weisler & Andrew Cole-Bulgin
The Kissing Booth 3	August 11, 2021	Vince Marcello	Jay Arnold & Vince Marcello	Ed Glauser, Vince Marcello, Michele Weisler & Andrew Cole-Bulgin

=== The Kissing Booth (2018) ===
Rochelle "Elle" Evans is a popular and outgoing student at her high school. Despite this, she has never been kissed. Together with her life-long best friend Lee, the pair plan a kissing booth event as a fundraiser for their school at a Spring Carnival fair. Elle has always had a secret crush on Lee's bad-boy older brother, named Noah. For years, she never acted on her feelings, since she and Lee had written rules about their friendship. One of those rules was to never date each other's family members. After sharing a kiss at the event, Elle and Noah begin a secret romantic relationship. When Lee finds out, there is a strain on the pair's friendship. After some time, their differences are overcome. Elle navigates the complexities of teenage-drama, while Noah prepares for Ivy League college experience at Harvard University. As he leaves, Elle realizes that though she doesn't know what the future holds, her romance with Noah will always be a part of her.

=== The Kissing Booth 2 (2020) ===
Elle begins her senior year of high school, while Noah is a freshman at Harvard. The couple navigate their lives, balancing full schedules of education and studies, and continuing their long-distance relationship. This is complicated as each of them find attraction elsewhere; Elle with a new student named Marco, and Noah with a British student named Chloe. Elle tags along with her best friend and his girlfriend named Rachel, as a third wheel on the couple's dates, only to unintentionally cause friction in their relationship. Noah meanwhile asks Elle to once again break one of her best friend rules with Lee, and wants her to move to attend college with him once she graduates high school. Lee however wants her to continue her schooling, with him at Berkeley. Noah realizes that his feelings for Chloe are only as a friend, while Marco tries to convince Elle that they have something more. Noah and Elle reconcile at her graduation. Elle receives letters from Harvard and Berkeley notifying her that she is accepted at both schools. She faces the difficult decision of choosing her best friend, or her love life with Noah.

=== The Kissing Booth 3 (2021) ===
After graduation, Elle struggles to choose between Berkeley and Harvard, while spending the summer at her childhood beach house with Noah, Lee, and Rachel. Struggles arise as tensions build with Noah and Marco, and Elle faces challenges with her father's new girlfriend, Linda. Following a fight with her father about his new girlfriend and breaking up with Noah due to concerns about her future, Elle ultimately realizes she needs to prioritize her own happiness. She applies to University of Southern California to study game design, reconciles with her father, and mends her friendships. Six years later, Elle is developing her own game, and after a chance reunion with Noah, they share a nostalgic motorcycle ride along the California coastline, hinting at a possible rekindled relationship and unresolved feelings.

== Cast and characters ==
List indicator

This section includes characters who will appear or have appeared in the franchise in main roles.

- An empty grey cell indicates the character was not in the film, or that the character's official presence has not yet been confirmed.

Character	Title		
Character	The Kissing Booth	The Kissing Booth 2	The Kissing Booth 3
Rochelle "Elle" Evans	Joey King	Joey King	Joey King
Noah Flynn	Jacob Elordi	Jacob Elordi	Jacob Elordi
Lee Flynn	Joel Courtney	Joel Courtney	Joel Courtney
Mike Evans	Stephen Jennings	Stephen Jennings	Stephen Jennings
Brad Evans	Carson White	Carson White	Carson White
Sara Flynn	Molly Ringwald	Molly Ringwald	Molly Ringwald
Mr. Flynn	Morné Visse	Morné Visse	Morné Visse
Rachel	Meganne Young	Meganne Young	Meganne Young
Marco Peña		Taylor Zakhar Perez	Taylor Zakhar Perez
Chloe Winthrop		Maisie Richardson-Sellers	Maisie Richardson-Sellers

== Additional crew and production details ==
Film	Crew/Detail					
Film	Composer	Cinematographer	Editor	Production companies	Distributing company	Running time
The Kissing Booth	Patrick Kirst	Anastas N. Michos	Paul Millspaugh	Netflix Original Films; Komixx Entertainment	Netflix	1hr 40mins
The Kissing Booth 2	Patrick Kirst	Anastas N. Michos	Paul Millspaugh	Clearblack Films; Netflix Original Films; Komixx Entertainment; Picture Loom Productions	Netflix	2hrs 11mins
The Kissing Booth 3	Patrick Kirst	Anastas N. Michos	Paul Millspaugh	Clearblack Films; Netflix Original Films; Komixx Entertainment; Picture Loom Productions	Netflix	1hr 53mins

== Reception ==
Film	Rotten Tomatoes	Metacritic
The Kissing Booth	15% (13 reviews)	—N/a
The Kissing Booth 2	27% (41 reviews)	39/100 (12 critics)
The Kissing Booth 3	25% (20 reviews)	36/100 (7 critics)
