= Meganne Young =

South African actress

- Born: 22 March 1990 (age 36); Cape Town, South Africa
- Education: CityVarsity; Guildford School of Acting
- Occupations: Actress, director, spokesperson
- Years active: 2010–present

Meganne Young (born 22 March 1990) is a South African actress and director. She is best known for her roles in The Kissing Booth franchise and the Starz series Black Sails.

== Early life ==
Young was born in Cape Town to a South African father and an Australian mother. She spent her childhood moving around, with stints in Nigeria, Switzerland, and Sri Lanka where she took the International Baccalaureate at the Overseas School of Colombo. She pursued at an Advanced Diploma in Acting at the CityVarsity Cape Town campus, completing in 2011, before going on to graduate from the Guildford School of Acting in England as a part-time distance learner in 2014.

== Career ==
Young began her career in theatre and short films, earning 48 Hour Film and Fleur du Cap Theatre Award nominations for her work. She appeared in the British film Eye in the Sky. She landed her first major onscreen role as Abigail Ashe in Starz series Black Sails. She also made guest appearances in season 14 of Supernatural and in Legends of Tomorrow.

In 2018, she landed the role of Rachel in the Netflix original film The Kissing Booth. Young went on to reprise her role in the films' sequels, The Kissing Booth 2 (2020) and The Kissing Booth 3 (2021).

== Filmography ==
=== Film ===
Year	Film	Role	Notes
2012	Past.Tense		
2014	The Giver	Bride	
2015	Eye in the Sky	Lizzy	
2017	Blood Drive	Anne	
2018	The Kissing Booth	Rachel	
2018	The Bull	Mare	Short film
2019	We Are Not Alone	Gina	Short film
2020	The Kissing Booth 2	Rachel	
2021	The Kissing Booth 3	Rachel	

=== Television ===
Year	Film	Role	Notes
2013	The Challenger Disaster	Michelle Feynman	TV movie
2015	Bluestone 42	Nurse	
2015	Black Sails	Abigail Ashe	
2015	Zum Teufel mit der Wahrheit	Actress	TV movie
2015	Saints & Strangers	Priscilla Mullins	Miniseries
2017	The Dating Game Killer	Wendy Cade	TV movie
2018	Supernatural	Lydia Crawford	
2018	Legends of Tomorrow	Zelda Fitzgerald	

== Stage ==
Year	Title	Role	Notes
2010	Lenny and the Wasteland	Newt	National Arts Festival
2012	A Tale of Horribleness	My	National Arts Festival
2012	Pocket Shots	Ashley	National Arts Festival

== Awards and nominations ==
Year	Award	Category	Work	Result	Ref.
2012	48 Hour Film Festival	Best Actress	Past.Tense	Nominated	
2014	Fleur du Cap Theatre Awards	Rosalie van der Gucht Prize for New Directors		Nominated	
