= Hilton Pelser =

South African actor

- Born: Cape Town, South Africa
- Occupation: Actor
- Years active: 2018–present

Hilton Pelser is a South African actor. On television, he is known for his roles in the Starz series Dangerous Liaisons (2022) and the M-Net series Devil's Peak (2023). His films include the Kissing Booth trilogy (2018–2021), Moffie (2019) and Glasshouse (2021).

== Early life and education ==
Hilton Pelser was born and raised in Cape Town.

He attended the Bishops Diocesan College. He developed an interest in acting at a young age through his older sister, who was a professor of drama at AFDA.

== Career ==
Pelser made his debut as Barry in the 2018 Netflix teen film The Kissing Booth, as it was filmed in Cape Town. He would go on to reprise his role in the film's 2020 and 2021 sequels.

He then played Sergeant Brand in Oliver Hermanus' film adaptation of André Carl van der Merwe's semi-autobiography Moffie, which premiered at the 76th Venice Film Festival. Pelser appeared in the back-to-back television films Home Affairs: A Christmas Tale and Home Affairs: A Love Story in 2020 and 2021 respectively.

This was followed by a role in Kelsey Egan's SAFTA-nominated post-apocalyptic film Glasshouse (2022). Pelser joined the main cast of the Starz adaptation of Dangerous Liaisons as Gabriel Carrè, which premiered in 2022. He plays detective Benny Griessel in the British-South African crime thriller Devil's Peak, adapted from the novel by Deon Meyer, which aired in 2023.

== Filmography ==
=== Film ===
Year	Title	Role	Notes
2018	The Kissing Booth	Barry	Netflix film
2019	Moffie	Sergeant Brand	
2020	The Kissing Booth 2	Barry	Netflix film
2021	The Kissing Booth 3	Barry	Netflix film
2021	Glasshouse	The Stranger	
2026	A Prayer for the Dying	Chase	
2026	The Smell of Apples	Johan	

=== Television ===
Year	Title	Role	Notes
2020	Home Affairs: A Christmas Tale	Justin	Television film
2021	Home Affairs: A Love Story	Pieter Williams	Television film
2022	Dangerous Liaisons	Gabriel Carrè	Main role
2023	Devil's Peak	Benny Griessel	Main role
