= François Goetghebeur =

French film director

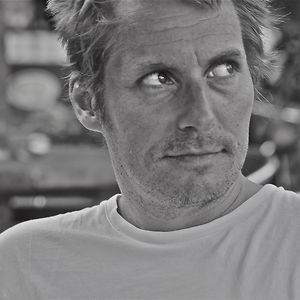
- Goetghebeur in 2010
- Born: 13 November 1974 (age 51)
- Occupations: Film director, photographer, art director

François Goetghebeur (born 13 November 1974) is a French film director, photographer and art director. He became known in the music world thanks to his work including music videos, recordings, documentaries and artists portraits.

== Early life ==
Goetghebeur is a native of Lille. He finished his education in the United States, where he studied business. He left to work as commercial in Spain from 1996 to 1997. After this experience, he worked as the CCO (chief communications officer) for a Swedish group before meeting LGM Production in 1999, where he worked in production before focusing his attention on directing.

== Career ==
In 2002, LGM Production gave him the editorial and artistic responsibility of important protests and demonstrations, for which he directed reports and institutional movies in Europe, Africa, the United States and Asia. At the same time, he was head of directing for the 'making of', teasers and documentaries for EuropaCorp, working alongside Pierre-Ange Le Pogam and Luc Besson, for whom he later worked with again, in particular as a cameraman on the implementation of "Arthur's and minimoys". His first short film was selected for the festival for the promotional film Méribel.

Starting in 2004, he introduced various series of documentaries ("musical Journeys" through all Europe for Mezzo, Tous Proprios for Discovery Channel, Guy Bedos for CALT, ...); directed several promotional films (for and with Pierre Palmade, Zinedine Zidane and even Adriana Karembeu); and he wrote and directed short programs of fiction bound for the Web ("A gesture for the environment" for the federation of "Caisses d'epargne," for example).

When LGM Production and France Télévision gave him the opportunity to film the Orchestra of Paris, managed by Christoph Eschenbach (for whom he later realized including all the Mahler symphonies), François focused his directing attention on the music, and in 2006, the concert film of Alain Chamfort "Impromptu in the Luxembourg Gardens" was nominated for Victoires de la Musique. "Carmina burana in the City" was selected by FIPA (International Festival of Audiovisual Programs), and he turned out the musical films in various forms: recordings of concerts, artist profiles, videos and documentaries.

Going from symphonic music to rap, jazz or rock, he has collaborated with many artists as diverse as Michel Legrand, Mathieu Chedid, Julien Clerc, Booba, Orelsan, Tryo, Oldelaf, Joey Starr, Selah Sue, Charlie Winston, Barbara Bonney, Alexandre Tharaud, Nolwenn Leroy, Hubert-Félix Thiéfaine, Dianne Reeves, Vincent Segal & Ballaké Sissoko, Jean-Claude Casadesus, Yannick Noah, Anne Sofie Von Otter and Jacques Audiard who worked with Francois as an advisor to direct the live singer Raphael.

Following the completion of the concert film "A Night in Versailles", his meeting with Vanessa Paradis influenced him to develop his work as a photographer. In addition to his personal research of photography, he quickly saw himself working on projects for various artists such as Raphael, Julien Clerc, Louis Chedid, Rohff, Nolwenn Leroy, Thomas Langman and Vanessa Paradis for whom he took photos during her 2010 tour.

Since 2010, he has returned to Morgan Production, working in different formats including "Victoires du jazz" (Victories of Jazz), "integral Chopin piano" by Pierre Arditi, and he has directed several documentaries including "Hellfest, metal told my mother," presented by Thomas VDB and "A Saint Laurent life" by Alain Chamfort. He also wrote several prime time television programs for France Television, including "Gala with the Union of Artists" in 2010, 2011 and 2012, the "Festival of Lorient Interceltique," and special evenings for artists like Maxime Le Forestier (San Francisco, La Maison Bleue (The Blue House). With Jean-Louis Aubert, he initiated the first episode of "Un Concert Unique" with France Television by combining concert, acoustical music and presenting an intimate portrait of an artist.

In 2012, he filmed his first opera in Orange Chorégies "Turandot" and his first ballet for the Opéra de Paris. He has participated in worldwide 48 Hour Film Project competition ("to make a film in 48 hours"), co-producing with Nicolas Lebrun. The film "The last role of Jacques Serres" won the prize for best film as well as the best image among the 113 presented to the Paris edition of 2012.

In 2013, the 51st Gala with the Union of Artists was aired during prime time on France 2, with a reported 4.2 million television viewers (16.8% of viewers), making it the most watched program of the evening. In 2014, he attended the Cannes Film Festival.

In 2016, he directed a music video for Johnny Hallyday's song "J'en parlerai au diable". This became Hallyday's final video before his death in 2017. The video has amassed more than 19 million views on YouTube. Since then, he has been working on a feature film made up of footage of Hallyday's final road trip, to be released in 2020.

In 2019, he directed Claudia Tagbo's one woman show for CSTAR. He continues to direct television special and concerts, as of 2019.

== Filmography ==
=== Documentaries ===
- 2002:
  - Michel Vaillant- Making of interactif (DVD & CANAL+) – (EuropaCorp)
  - 24H avec Mia Frye (DVD) – (EuropaCorp)
- 2003:
  - Le Transporteur – Making of (DVD) – (EuropaCorp)
  - Fanfan la Tulipe – Making of (DVD) – (EuropaCorp)
- 2004:
  - Voyage musical à Prague – "Le violon sous l'oreiller" (52'-MEZZO) – (LGM)
  - Voyage musical en Slovénie – "A chœur ouvert" (52'-MEZZO) – (LGM)
  - 24H avant la IXe – Dans les coulisses de l'Orchestre de Paris (France Télévision) – (LGM)
- 2005:
  - Voyage musical à Malte – "Pur Malte" (52'-MEZZO) – (LGM)
  - Voyage musical en Andalousie – "Sevilla"(52'-MEZZO) – (LGM)
  - Voyage musical en Lituanie -"Géré" (52'-MEZZO) – (LGM)
  - Jean-Claude Casadesus, Portrait d'un jeune homme – (LGM)
  - Jean-Claude Casadesus, Escapade à Prague – (LGM)
- 2006 :
  - Voyage musical en Sweden – Happy Swedish People (52'-MEZZO) – (LGM)
  - Voyage musical au Denmark – We were vikings (52'-MEZZO) – (LGM)
  - Taxi 3 – Making of (DVD) – (EuropaCorp)
  - Magali Leger – Cantatrice Nouvelle Génération (26') – (CLC)
  - Tous proprios / les combles (Discovery channel, NT1) – (KOPROD)
- 2007 :
  - Tous proprios / les lofts (Discovery channel, NT1) – (KOPROD)
  - Tous proprios / acheter un apart à Paris (Discovery channel, NT1) – (KOPROD)
  - Tous proprios Best of (Discovery channel, NT1) – (KOPROD)
  - "Bedos, c'est moi!" – Portrait (60') – Avec Jamel Debouze, Gad Elmaleh, Muriel Robin, Thierry Ardisson, Michel Drucker... – (CALT)
  - Epk & retrospective Yves St Laurent, Petit Palais
- 2010 :
  - Une vie Saint Laurent, Alain Chamfort – Epk & retrospective St Laurent Petit Palais – (TESSLAND)
  - D'une rive à l'autre: 9 documentaires – (PMP MORGANE)
  - Vanessa Paradis -Tournée été 2011 – (PMP MORGANE)
- 2011 :
  - Une journée avec Nolwenn Leroy (90', France 3) – (PMP MORGANE)
  - Une vie Saint Laurent – documentaire France 5 – (MORGANE)
  - Hellfest : le métal expliqué à ma mère (avec Thomas VDB) – (BLEU IROISE)
  - Maxime Le Forestier – C'est une maison bleue (France Télévision) – (BHD WORLD)
  - Julien Clerc, Fou, peut-être – documentaire (60')
  - Les victoires de la musique jazz (120', France Télévision) – (PMP MORGANE)
- 2012:
  - Sheila (France Télévision) – (PMP MORGANE)
  - Les Stentors – TF1 musique – (TF1 Musique)

=== Musical movies ===
- 2002 :
  - Masterclass à l'école normale de musique : Barbara Bonney – François-René Duchâble – Paul Badura-Skoda – (LGM)
- 2004 :
  - Orchestre de Paris, Christoph Eschenbach : Beethoven Ixe Symphonie & Rendering de Berio – (LGM)
  - Récitals au musée d'Orsay : José van Dam – Anne Sofie von Otter – (LGM)
  - Tété au zénith de Paris – (Dance hall)
- 2005:
  - CARMINA BURANA DANS LA VILLE (Jean-Philippe Sarcos) (FIPA) – (LGM)
  - Orchestre National de Lyon / Le concerto – St Saens, Haydn, Bartók – (CLC)
  - Alain Chamfort : Impromptu aux jardins du Luxembourg (nominé aux Victoires de la Musique) – (MARCASSIN)
  - Jean-Claude Casadesus Concert Anniversaire, Orchestre national de Lille – (LGM)
- 2006 :
  - Orchestre national de Lille – Jean-Claude CASADESUS – Tchaikovsky Thierry Escaich – (Cercle bleu)
- 2008:
  - Anne Gastinel (Symphonie de Brahms n°1) avec l'Orchestre National de Lyon) – (CLC)
  - Martha Argerich & Akiko Ebi – Récital piano à Lyon – (CLC)
  - Roger Muraro – Récital piano à Lyon – (CLC)
  - Turangalîla-Symphonie – Orchestre de Paris – Pleyel – (CLC)
  - Goran Bregović et son orchestre pour les mariages et les enterrements – Nuits de Fourvière – (GRAND ANGLE)
  - Le Trio Kadinsky (Harri Maki) Granada Festival : Alhambra – (Grand angle)
- 2009:
  - Granada 2009 Alhambra: London Haydn Quartet- Eric Hoeprich – (Grand angle)
  - Orchestre de Paris – intégrale des symphonies de MAHLER, Christoph Eschenbach (France télévision) – (LGM)
  - Orchestre de Paris – Symphonie MAHLER 5 – Pleyel – (LGM)
  - Orchestre de Paris – Symphonie MAHLER 4 – Pleyel – (LGM)
  - Orchestre de Paris – Symphonie MAHLER 3 – Pleyel – (LGM)
  - Orchestre de Paris – Symphonie MAHLER 7 – Pleyel – (LGM)
  - Quatuor Debussy à Lyon – (CLC)
  - Lilya Zilberstein – récital de piano à Lyon – (CLC)
  - Cantates de Bach – Ambronay 2009, la petite bande – (CLC)
  - Vincent Ségal & Ballaké Sissoko – KoraCello (Rhinojazz) – (CLC)
  - Stabat Mater de Pergolèse – Le banquet céleste à l'oratoire du Louvre – (CLC)
  - Krakow Festival 2009: Il Giardino Armonico – Fabio Biondi – (GRAND ANGLE)
  - DVD "Oldelaf en concert pour l'éternité" – (Roy Music)
  - Orchestre national de Lille (direct) – (3 Cafés Prod)
  - Kery James à l'Olympia – (PMP MORGANE)
  - Matthieu Chedid – Showcase Mister Mistere à la Cigale- (PMP MORGANE)
  - Rohff au Zénith de Paris – (PMP MORGANE)
  - Tryo : live à Bercy – (PMP MORGANE)
  - Michel Legrand – Concert symphonique (musique de films) – (LGM)
  - Michel Legrand -Big Band Jazz – Pleyel "Legrand Back In Paris" – (LGM)
- 2010:
  - Jean-Guihen Queyras & Michel Dalberto – Récital de piano à Lyon – (CLC)
  - Iddo Bar-Shaï – récital de piano à Lyon – (CLC)
  - Nicholas Angelich- récital de piano à Lyon – (CLC)
  - Éric Le Sage joue Schumann – récital de piano à Lyon – (CLC)
  - Week-end musique de chambre française à Pleyel – (CLC)
  - Dianne Reeves au Châtelet "My Living Room in Paris" – (GRAND ANGLE)
  - Krys à L'Elysée Montmartre – (GRAND ANGLE)
  - Real limit – Zénith de Paris – (GRAND ANGLE)
  - Bon Anniversaire M. Chopin / Intégrale Chopin (15heures 54minutes!!!) – (PMP MORGANE)
  - 49^{e} Gala de l'Union des artistes (primetime France) – (PMP MORGANE)
  - Christoph Eschenbach – Anniversaire 70 ans – MOZART 12 & 23 – (LGM)
  - Liat Cohen, une guitare à Prague – (GRAND ANGLE)
  - Amel Bent – Zénith de Paris – (GRAND ANGLE)
      - Le Printemps de Bourges 2010 :

      - BB Brunes (59'47") – (PMP MORGANE)
      - Eiffel – (PMP MORGANE)
      - Nada Surf – PMP MORGANE)
      - Pony Pony Run Run – (PMP MORGANE
      - Two Door Cinema Club – (PMP MORGANE)
      - Caravan Palace – (PMP MORGANE)

  - Vanessa Paradis – Une nuit à Versailles (CANAL+ & DVD) – (PMP MORGANE)
  - Vanessa Paradis Unplugged (en coulisses du Casino de Paris) – (PMP MORGANE)
  - 40^{e} festival interceltique de Lorient (PrimeTime France3) – (BLEU IROISE)
  - 113 au Bataclan – PMP MORGANE)
  - Raphaël par Jacques Audiard (conseiller artistique) – (ANGORA)
  - Alain Chamfort, clip À la droite de Dior – MAGE MUSIC – (TESSLAND)
- 2011 :
  - Oldelaf, clip "la tristitude" – (Roy Music)
  - Ben Mazué – 3 clips : "Mes monuments", "C'est léger", "Feeling high" (Sony – MOVIDA)
  - Oldelaf – Alhambra Paris – (AVP)
  - Nolwenn Leroy, Nuit bretonne (France 3) – (PMP MORGANE)
  - La Fouine Zénith de Paris – (PMP MORGANE)
  - Concert Budapest Orchestra, Pleyel – (CLC)
  - Oldelaf in concert – (CLC)
  - Festival Interceltique de Lorient (FIL) 2011 (Primetime France 3) – (PMP MORGANE)
  - Tri Yann: concert anniversary to Lorient – (PMP MORGANE)
  - Booba Live à Bercy – (PMP MORGANE)
  - Jean-Louis Aubert – Concert unique(France 2) (GRAND ANGLE – ANGORA)
  - Vanessa Paradis, Mathieu Chedid, Sean Lennon / Un monstre à Paris – Direct Trianon, 100 salles Pathé – (CHENELIERE PROD)
  - Le 50e Gala de l'union des artistes (Prime time France 2) – PMP MORGANE – (ANGORA)
  - Hubert-Félix Thiéfaine 'Homo Plebis Ultimae Tour' (DVD Sony MUSIC) – (PMP MORGANE)
  - Les prêtres Gloria (DVD TF1) – (TF1 PRODUCTION)
  - Les victoires de la musique Jazz (120', France Télévision) – (PMP MORGANE)
- 2012 :
  - Alan Stivell 1972–2012 : Concert anniversary à l'Olympia – (PMP MORGANE)
  - Le 51e Gala de l'union des artistes (Prime time France 2 ) – PMP MORGANE – (ANGORA)

=== Photo ===
- 2009 : Rohff au zénith Dress handkerchief CD of the live DVD
- 2010 : Vanessa Paradis : Photos of the tour for notebook CD / DVD and press – (Barclay – Universal)
- 2011 : Raphaël vu par Jacques Audiard – Photos CD/DVD – (EMI)
- 2011 : Julien Clerc – Fou, peut-être – Photos press studio – (EMI)
- 2011 : Julien Clerc – Julien Clerc – Photos tour – (Free Demo)

=== Shows and fictions ===
- Maïwenn – Le pois chiche au Café de la gare
- 2007 : Casino Lucien Barrière – Jour de chance (Les Chinois) – (PRIME TOUCH)
- 2008 : Un geste pour l'environnement: 52 épisodes (LCP) – (AIRBLOC)
- 2008 : Flamenka Nueva au casino de Paris – (2425 PROD)
- 2009 : Le prix de Lausanne en direct (Mezzo) – (prix de Lausanne)
- 2010 : Le cabaret new burlesque à la Nouvelle Eve (direct PARIS PREMIERE & DVD) – (ANAE)
- 2011 : Laurent Lafitte, comme ça se prononce (direct PARIS PREMIERE & DVD) – (ANAE)
- 2012 : Surenes cité danse 2011 – Opening & close (France 2) – (SOUFFLEURS DE VERT)

=== Corporate ===
- 2002 : internal movie – Coulisses Cannes 2002 – (EuropaCorp)
- 2004 : Conception, editorial staff and artistic direction for the national Federation of the public works and the group of public works COLAS – (LGM)
- 2007 : Colas Indonésie, Malaisie, Vietnam, Thaïlande -(Colas)
- 2007 : Casino Lucien Barrière – Jour de chance, interactive fiction -(PRIME TOUCH)
- 2009 : Canderel, Portraits -(2425 PROD)

=== Advertisements ===
- 2004 : FNTP "Un métier pour les hommes", "Les jeunes" – (LGM)
- 2006 : Imposture – Patrick Bouchitey- Teaser – (EuropaCorp)
- 2006 : St Hubert cholegram – (2425 PROD)
- 2006 : Saga St Hubert Omega 3 : 4 films – (2425 PROD)
- 2006 : Zinedine Zidane – Assurances GENERALI – (2425 PROD)
- 2006 : Adriana Karembeu – Aicha light (confiture)(Maroc) – (2425 PROD)
- 2006 : Colas Vegecol – (2425 PROD)
- 2007 : Paris fait sa comédie 2007 (M6) – (CALT)
- 2007 : Colas nanosoft – (LGM)
- 2008 : Paris fait sa comédie 2008 (M6) – (CALT)
- 2008 : Pub Pierre Palmade le comique (TF1) – (THEATRE FONTAINE)
- 2009 : Paris fait sa comédie 2009 (M6) – (CALT)
- 2011 : Pub Julien Clerc – Fou, peut-être (TF1) – (MAGALI FILM)
- 2012 : Pierre Palmade, Michèle Laroque Ils se re-aiment, – (TANGO) (TF1) AVP/Kinaime

=== Other ===
- Cameraman for Luc Besson, Arthur et les Minimoys (film) – (EuropaCorp)
- 2011 : Artistic adviser of Jacques Audiard for Raphaël live
- 2011 : Artistic direction and co-writing 5 titles album le monde est beau Oldelaf – (Roy Music)
