= Tom Sawyer & Huckleberry Finn =

- Official release poster
- Directed by: Jo Kastner
- Written by: Jo Kastner
- Based on: The Adventures of Tom Sawyer; Adventures of Huckleberry Finn by Mark Twain
- Produced by: Gabriel Georgiev; Jo Kastner
- Starring: Joel Courtney; Jake T. Austin; Katherine McNamara; Val Kilmer
- Cinematography: Lorenzo Senatore
- Edited by: Dávid Jancsó
- Music by: Róbert Gulya
- Production company: Cine-partners
- Distributed by: VMI Worldwide
- Release dates: October 23, 2014 (UAE); April 7, 2015 (United States)
- Running time: 90 minutes
- Country: United States
- Language: English

Tom Sawyer & Huckleberry Finn is a 2014 American comedy-drama/adventure film directed by Jo Kastner and starring Joel Courtney as Tom Sawyer, Jake T. Austin as Huckleberry Finn, Katherine McNamara as Becky Thatcher, Noah Munck as Ben Rogers, and with Val Kilmer as Mark Twain.

It is based on Mark Twain's novels The Adventures of Tom Sawyer (1876) and Adventures of Huckleberry Finn (1884). The film was released by VMI Worldwide.

== Plot summary ==
The adventure unfolds as Tom Sawyer and Huck Finn – Tom's friend from the streets – witness a murder in the graveyard. Tom and Huck flee to Jackson's Island and make a pact never to tell anyone about the incident. However, when the good-natured Muff Potter, who has been blamed for the murder, is sentenced to death by hanging, Tom attempts to break Muff out of jail, but it does not go as planned and Muff returns to jail. So Tom breaks his promise and returns to exonerate Muff Potter. Injun Joe, the actual murderer, makes a hasty exit from the courtroom during the trial. A short time later, Tom and Huck find references to a treasure and have to face Injun Joe again.

== Cast ==
- Joel Courtney as Tom Sawyer
- Jake T. Austin as Huckleberry Finn
- Katherine McNamara as Becky Tatcher
- Val Kilmer as Mark Twain
- Noah Munck as Ben Rogers
- Sewell Whitney as Defense Attorney
- Miles Mussenden as Jim
- Jackson Solley as Sid
- Sonja Kirchberger as Widow Douglas
- Christine Kaufmann as Aunt Polly
- Dan Van Husen as Windy
- Harry Anichkin as Judge Thatcher
- Nikola Dodov as Muff Potter

== Production ==
Tom Sawyer was filmed in Bulgaria in August 2011.
