= Don't Let Me Go (film) =

- Directed by: Giorgio Serafini
- Written by: Giorgio Serafini
- Produced by: Giuseppe Pedersoli
- Starring: Joel Courtney; Isabelle Fuhrman; Natalia Dyer; LaDon Drummond; Mariel Alliata Bronner; Trace Adkins; James LeGros; Peter Bogdanovich
- Cinematography: Erik Curtis
- Edited by: Jane Soon-Choi
- Music by: Riccardo Eberspacher
- Release date: April 6, 2013 (Brussels International Fantastic Film Festival)
- Running time: 96 minutes
- Country: United States
- Language: English

Don't Let Me Go (also titled The Healer and The Between) is a 2013 American fantasy horror film written and directed by Giorgio Serafini and starring Joel Courtney, Isabelle Fuhrman, James LeGros, and Peter Bogdanovich.

== Cast ==
- Joel Courtney as Nick Madsen
- Isabelle Fuhrman as Michelle
- James LeGros as Chris Madsen
- Peter Bogdanovich as Man
- Natalia Dyer as Banshee
- LaDon Drummond as Ella
- Mariel Alliata Bronner as Ghost Girl
- Trace Adkins as Driver

== Production ==
Filming occurred in North Carolina.
