= Kissing booth =

Festival or charity attraction where kisses are given in exchange for money

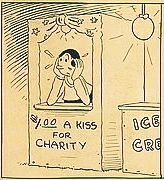
A kissing booth depicted in the 1921 comic "Something The Matter", in Thimble Theatre by E. C. Segar.

A kissing booth is an attraction, usually at a carnival, where the person running the booth kisses other people, often to raise funds for charity. There are newspaper articles dating back to at least the early 1900s advertising upcoming kissing booths and their "osculatory favors". A 1918 article from The Garden Island newspaper states, "All the horrors of war disappears for the man with a roll of bills at the Red Cross kissing booth -- that is 'till his wife sees him."

== Notable examples ==
In England during the 1700s, the Duchess of Devonshire was accused of operating a kissing booth during parliamentary elections.

=== "Hug a Homosexual" Booth ===
At a national convention of the American Library Association (ALA) in Dallas in 1971, LGBT equality campaigner Barbara Gittings staffed a kissing booth underneath the banner "Hug a Homosexual," with a "women only" side and a "men only" side. She hosted the booth with other members of the ALA's grassroots Task Force on Gay Liberation in an effort to raise awareness about the group.

When no one took advantage of it, she and Alma Routsong kissed in front of rolling television cameras. In describing its success, despite most of the reaction being negative, Gittings said, "We needed to get an audience. So we decided, let's show gay love live. We were offering free—mind you, free—same-sex kisses and hugs. Let me tell you, the aisles were mobbed, but no one came into the booth to get a free hug. So we hugged and kissed each other. It was shown twice on the evening news, once again in the morning. It put us on the map."

=== Recent examples ===
American musician Marnie Stern ran a kissing booth at some of her concerts in 2008.

== Popular culture ==
The 2018 movie The Kissing Booth has the title referencing a kissing booth and involves it as part of its plot. It got two sequels which turned it into The Kissing Booth film series.

== See also ==
- Dunk tank
- List of amusement rides
