= Photomarathon =

Timed photography competition with predetermined themes, no editing

A photomarathon is a photography competition in which participants must take a series of photographs on predetermined subjects in a set period of time, typically 12 to 24 hours. On most competitions, part of the rules is that photos should be handed in "straight out of camera" -with no post-editing or production allowed. Photos are typically judged using criteria that combine photographic technique and creativity in interpreting the theme.

There are over 74 competitions worldwide which use some variations of the rules above.

The photomarathon concept started in Madrid in 1985, before being taken up in Copenhagen, Denmark, where a competition has been taking place annually since 1989. In 2014 the Danish competition took place in Copenhagen and Aalborg, with separate competitions lasting 6, 12 and 24 hours, for both digital cameras and mobile phones. Since 2016, Photomarathon Sheffield has taken place in the city of Sheffield, UK, with a virtual edition in 2020 due to the pandemic.

== History ==
The photographic marathon is an idea generated by Eduardo Soto Perez, Antonio Bolivar Sanchez Cañete, who then were called Collective Cartela (along with Juan Antonio Manzano Aróstegui and Luis Alvarez Gallovich), in late 1983. In 1984, presented to the Youth Department of the City of Madrid (Spain), where Chema de Mingo and Chus Medrano considered the interest of its sponsorship to the cultural dynamism of the city. They obtained the support of Kodak Spain and Albacolor laboratories.

In 1985 they managed to launch the first edition in Madrid with a surprising success participation (2500 photographers). This competition would be quickly imitated in cities across Spain and many others around the world. The Collective Cartela itself organized 4 successive editions in Madrid. Also held in Santiago de Compostela (Spain) and later, with his partner, Antonio de Juana, in Lisbon (Portugal).

For 24 hours the photographers had to make 24 photographs with themes that were provided to them 4 by 4, at checkpoints that were performed every 4 hours. The first edition included 2512 participants, the film was in black and white. Participants should pass 6 dynamic controls plus the final film's collection point. This structure was established as a functional dynamics for subsequent editions. Several version came later, half marathons of 12 hours or even less were made.

Given the impossibility that existed in Spain to properly register an idea, Eduardo Soto Perez and Antonio Bolívar, now as the company Mil Millones, SA, they proceeded to register Photographic marathon at the Legal Deposit (M-28891-1986) being subsequently also registered in the Registry of Intellectual Property of Madrid with the number 02482. The idea triumphed and soon spread in cities across Spain and other countries, photographic marathons were and are still held in many cities. In 1987 a first Photo Marathon was held in New York, in Stockholm in 1988. In 1989 hold his first Copenhagen Photomarathon, following Berlin in 1998. Both events continue to organize annually.

Photomarathons and the European Month of Photography

In 2010 Photomarathons were first represented during the European Month of Photography, with a joint exhibition in Berlin, under the theme "Time travel". The exhibition was a retrospective of the 10 years of the Photomarathon in Berlin, and included the three winning series of Copenhagen and Cardiff photomarathons.

In 2012, the photomarathons in the cities of Copenhagen, Cardiff and Berlin shared the same topic, with the winning photographs in each city being exhibited in the others.

== Keys ==
One reason for the massive success of this contest was to combine photography and action: conducting urban photographic adventures.

The proposed themes stimulate the creativity of the participants (for example: "They come from abroad"), thousands of photographers concentrated in certain parts of the city in a precise moment (“Walking by Puerta del Sol at twelve o'clock when I decided to take a picture of the clock"), or filled parks with excited reporters trying to capture the image suggested ("Elf, a costumed character who must be locate and photograph in the Buen Retiro Park”).

This opened a new dimension to photographic competitions introducing ingenuity, spontaneity, active participation and creativity, and perseverance and physical and mental strength to complete 24 hours of the contest.

The photographers competed but also made friends, had fun and acquired a better knowledge of their city, museums, places and services. In addition the organization prepared in each control artistic and cultural activities (small plays of theater, exhibition of short films, musical performances, art exhibitions, participatory structures, mazes, swimming in a public pool at dawn, etc.) all that were organized exclusively for the photographers during the contest.

Some of the topics that were proposed along 4 editions held in Madrid: "Self Portrait," "Music, music, music", "News of the Day", "Sunrise in Madrid" "Morning Sport", "Nature, flora and fauna", "Madrid`s Cocidito", "Will jump to 12.00 from the top of the Torre de Madrid", "Stumble", "Untitled", "Farewell", etc.

The jury, choose among photographers and artists of renown (Ouka Lele, Miguel Trillo, Ciuco, Jorge Arranz, etc.) and, from the second edition on, incorporating the winners of the previous editions (Daniel Font, Amador Toril Jose Antonio Red, etc.). The awards were given at a mass party followed for an exhibition of photographs of the winners.

== Ancillary purposes ==
The photomarathon has also been used by some educationalists as a study aid.

== Photomarathon around the world ==
There are over 80 photomarathons held around the world in over 30 countries. The vast majority are throughout Europe, North America and South America. In Asia there is a competition in Yangon, Myanmar and since 2014 in Shenyang, China. In Africa a photomarathon is held in Nairobi, Kenya.

== See also ==
- 48 Hour Film Project
