= Liat Cohen =

Israeli-born French musician (born 1971)

Liat Cohen (Hebrew: לית כהן; born 17 October 1971) an Israeli-born French classical guitarist. Cohen is the recipient of concert diplomas and first prizes from the Schola Cantorum de Paris and the Conservatoire de Paris, a laureate of the École Normale de Musique de Paris, and the winner of international competitions in Rome and Paris. Cohen was the first classical guitarist to receive the Nadia and Lili Boulanger Prize awarded by the Foundation of France.

== Performances ==
Cohen has played at the Palais des beaux-arts (Brussels), Círculo de Bellas Artes (Madrid), Salle Cortot (Paris), the National Theatre of Costa Rica, the Opéra national de Montpellier, the Musée des Invalides (Paris), the Skirball Cultural Center (Los Angeles), The Palais des congrès de Lyon, the Jerusalem Theatre (Tel Aviv), and the Palazzo Barberini in Rome.

She has performed with leading orchestras and at festivals in the United States, Australia, Brazil, Peru, Mexico, Argentina, Costa Rica, Turkey, Sweden and Israel, many being broadcast live on national television and radio including Radio France, Israel Broadcasting Authority and the Australian Broadcasting Corporation.

== Reviews ==
The musicologist Yehoshua Hirshberg said that Cohen "...is a guitarist continuing the tradition begun by Andrés Segovia, of transforming the intimate guitar into a magnificent solo instrument, projecting over large concert auditoria while maintaining the warm and gentle nuances of the instrument".

French Guitarist magazine called her one of the most important guitarists in the world today, and Guitare magazine called her a "virtuoso of poignant, delicate sound".

== Albums ==
Cohen's first album was recorded with the Jerusalem Symphony Orchestra in 2001. It won a Critics Award for Interpretation and was selected as CD of the Year by American National Radio,

In 2003, Cohen transcribed and recorded works by J.S. Bach while artist in residence at the Mont St. Michel Abbey in France. This work culminated in a solo performance during the 20th European Cultural Heritage Day and an album published by Codaex France: Liat Cohen plays Bach at Mont St Michel. A week of national television coverage on the MEZZO Music Channel followed.

In 2005, Cohen recorded a classical and popular melody album, Latino Ladino, for Harmonia Mundi.

In 2007, Buda Music released the album Variations Ladino, with music from 15th century Spain to the present day, comprising solo and chamber pieces based on the Ladino tradition. Roten wrote of the album: "The acoustic result is savoured as an initiatory journey in which pleasure is paramount."

In 2009, Cohen, accompanied by the Talich Quartet, released a double album Virtuosi, and the album Concertos, both on the Warner Classics label.

In 2014, they released album Rio-Paris.
