= Beth Reekles =

Welsh author (born 1995)

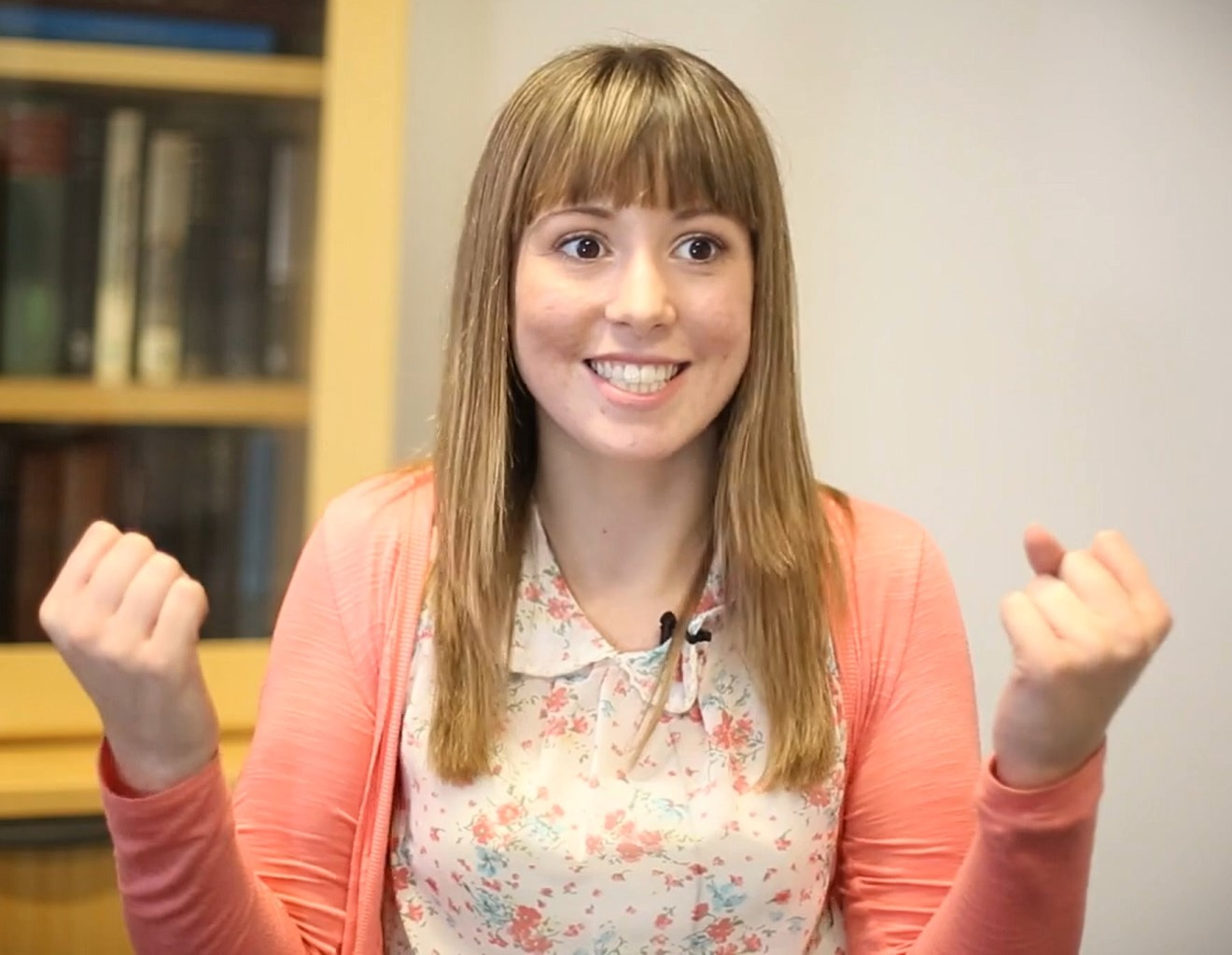
- Reeks talks about her interest in physics in 2013
- Born: Bethan Reeks; 7 June 1995 (age 31); Newport, Wales
- Education: Exeter University
- Writing career
- Notable works: The Kissing Booth (2012); Rolling Dice (2013); Out of Tune (2014); The Kissing Booth 2: Going the Distance (2020)
- Website: www.authorbethreekles.com

Bethan Reeks (born 7 June 1995), better known by her pen name Beth Reekles, is a Welsh author of young adult fiction.

== Biography ==
Beth Reekles was born on 7 June 1995 and grew up in Newport, Wales where she attended local primary school Mount Pleasant Primary and comprehensive Bassaleg School. She graduated from Exeter University with a degree in physics.

When Reekles was 15, having grown tired of stories of "vampires and werewolves", she wrote her first young adult novel, The Kissing Booth, publishing it chapter by chapter on Wattpad, a story sharing site. The novel was immensely popular, winning the Wattpad 2011 prize for Most Popular Teen Fiction, and when she was 17, she was offered a three-book contract by Penguin Random House. The Kissing Booth was published by Penguin Random House in 2012, followed by Rolling Dice and Out of Tune. A year later, she was named by Time magazine as one of "The 16 Most Influential Teens of 2013". She was named in The Times as one of the "Top 25 under 20 The new icons of a generation" in 2014.

The Kissing Booth was adapted for film, also titled The Kissing Booth, which premiered on Netflix in 2018. A sequel The Kissing Booth 2: Going the Distance was published in 2020 and a film adaptation, The Kissing Booth 2, premiered on Netflix the same year. A third film The Kissing Booth 3: One Last Time accompanied by a book was released on 11 August 2021. Reekles's first adult novel, Love, Locked Down, was published by Sphere Books in February 2022. Beth's novel Faking It was published on 2 February 2023.

== Major works ==
- The Kissing Booth (2012)
- Rolling Dice (2013)
- Out of Tune (2014)
- The Kissing Booth 2: Going the Distance (2020)
- The Kissing Booth 3: One Last Time (2021)
- Love, Locked Down (2022)
- Seven Days of You (2022)
