= The Kissing Booth 3 =

2021 film by Vince Marcello

- Promotional release poster
- Directed by: Vince Marcello
- Written by: Vince Marcello; Jay Arnold
- Based on: The Kissing Booth by Beth Reekles
- Produced by: Ed Glauser; Andrew Cole-Bulgin; Vince Marcello; Michele Weisler
- Starring: Joey King; Joel Courtney; Jacob Elordi; Taylor Zakhar Perez; Maisie Richardson-Sellers; Meganne Young; Molly Ringwald
- Cinematography: Anastas Michos
- Edited by: Paul Millspaugh
- Music by: Patrick Kirst
- Production companies: Picture Loom Productions; Clearblack Films; Komixx Entertainment
- Distributed by: Netflix
- Release date: August 11, 2021
- Running time: 113 minutes
- Country: United States
- Language: English

The Kissing Booth 3 is a 2021 American teen romantic comedy film directed by Vince Marcello and written by Marcello and Jay Arnold. The third and final installment in The Kissing Booth trilogy based on Beth Reekles' novel of the same name (after The Kissing Booth and The Kissing Booth 2), the film stars Joey King, Joel Courtney, Jacob Elordi, Taylor Zakhar Perez, Maisie Richardson-Sellers, Meganne Young and Molly Ringwald.

The film was released on Netflix on August 11, 2021. The film, like its predecessors, was met with negative reviews from critics.

== Plot ==
After a post-graduation road trip, Elle still has not decided between going to Berkeley or Harvard – although Noah is already looking for an off-campus apartment for them. When Noah and Lee's parents announce they are selling the beach house where they all spent their childhoods, Elle, Noah, Lee, and Lee's girlfriend, Rachel, spend the summer there to help prepare for the sale.

Lee shows Rachel his plans for them to see each other on holidays while going to colleges across the country from each other, while Elle is suddenly faced with Berkeley's deadline. Choosing to go to Harvard with Noah upsets Lee, so she promises to spend the summer doing their beach bucket list together.

Noah's friend Chloe – whom Elle once thought he was having an affair with – arrives at the beach house, while Marco (whom Elle kissed) gets a job in the area. During a day at the waterpark, Noah and Marco clash, prompting Noah to call Elle naive for not seeing that Marco still has feelings for her. Tensions escalate when she struggles to divide her time between the brothers. Simultaneously, Elle struggles with accepting her father's new girlfriend, Linda (also a friend of her late mom), fearing that she wants to replace her.

Encouraged by Chloe (who is coping with her parents' divorce) to talk to Elle, Noah makes up with her. Marco shows up at the Fourth of July party where he again fights with Noah and punches him, who refuses to retaliate. Marco admits to Elle he does still have feelings for her, but she rejects him. That night, Elle fights with her father over Linda, accusing him of only dating her for his own pride; in response, he angrily recounts the sacrifices he has made for her and her brother Brad and that she is not the only person who deserves to be loved.

Unaware that Noah saw her acceptance letter to Berkeley, Elle goes to find him at their spot. Worried she is only going to Harvard for him and that she will regret it, Noah breaks up with her. Heartbroken, Elle misses a bucket list with Lee to play Dance Dance Revolution. Arguing, Lee tells her that he has never mattered to her compared to Noah, while she tells him to grow up and that all of her decisions this summer have been about trying to make everybody else happy.

Noah and Lee's mother tells Elle she should start thinking about what she wants to do and choose a college based on that. Chloe and Elle talk about Noah while saying goodbye, with Rachel eavesdropping on their conversation. Having seen the issues Elle and Noah's relationship had, Rachel breaks up with Lee, though she hopes they will someday reunite.

Acknowledging how happy Brad is around her, Elle eventually understands and accepts Linda, reconciling with her father. Marco apologizes to her and they say their farewells amicably before she makes up with Lee. Elle realizes that she has spent so long maintaining her relationships with Noah and Lee that she has not worked out what makes her happy. Elle applies to University of Southern California to study game design. Inspired by her, Noah and Lee's mom decides not to sell the beach house.

Six years later, Elle is developing her own game and is back in town. She and Lee remain best friends, visiting the fated Kissing Booth at the Charity Fair and Carnival. Additionally, Lee and Rachel got back together and became engaged after college. Elle sees Noah for (presumably) the first time since their breakup there, where he reveals he has job offers at law firms in both LA and NYC. Noah suggests going on a motorcycle ride when he is back in town and Elle agrees. They part ways, but not before looking back at each other, suggesting a rekindle of their former relationship.

== Cast ==
- Joey King as Elle Evans
- Joel Courtney as Lee Flynn
- Jacob Elordi as Noah Flynn
- Taylor Zakhar Perez as Marco Valentin Peña
- Maisie Richardson-Sellers as Chloe Winthrop
- Meganne Young as Rachel
- Molly Ringwald as Mrs. Flynn
- Stephen Jennings as Mike Evans
- Chloe Williams as Joni Evans
- Morné Visser as Mr. Flynn
- Bianca Bosch as Olivia
- Zandile Madliwa as Gwyneth
- Camilla Wolfson as Mia
- Carson White as Brad Evans
- Judd Krok as Ollie
- Frances Sholto-Douglas as Vivian
- Evan Hengst as Miles
- Sanda Shandu as Randy
- Hilton Pelser as Barry
- Trent Rowe as Melvin
- Michelle Allen as Heather
- Joshua Eddy as Tuppen
- Nathan Lynn as Cameron
- Byron Langley as Warren
- Cameron Scott as Ashton
- Bianca Amato as Linda
- Daneel Van Der Walt as May

== Production ==
In July 2020, it was announced the third film had been secretly shot back-to-back with the second film in South Africa in 2019, with King, Elordi, Courtney, Perez, Richardson-Sellers and Young all reprising their roles. Marcello again directs from a screenplay he wrote alongside Jay Arnold.

== Release ==
The Kissing Booth 3 was released on August 11, 2021 on Netflix.

== Reception ==
On review aggregator Rotten Tomatoes, the film holds an approval rating of 25% based on 20 reviews, with an average rating of 3.6/10. Metacritic, which uses a weighted average, assigned the film a score of 36 out of 100, based on 8 critics, indicating "generally unfavorable" reviews.

The New York Times's Natalia Winkleman called The Kissing Booth 3 "a fitting, if bland finale." Kate Erbland from IndieWire gave the movie a grade of D+, criticizing the movie's characters and direction. She wrote: "King continues to breathe life into Elle, even when she's making ludicrous, immature decisions, while Elordi is reduced to looking mad and Courtney is saddled with some serious crying jags." She wrote that the series as a whole "could deliver a more adult, honest look at teenage lives, but it prefers to pull way back into chaste, wholly immature territory." Monica Castillo of RogerEbert.com gave the film 1.5/4 stars, writing: "To Marcello and co-writer Jay S. Arnold's credit, there are a handful of surprises that defy some of the more expected youthful rom-com tropes. But the rest is a lot of the same teenage romantic tribulations we've seen before."

Peter Debruge of Variety wrote: "there's plenty of fan service ... but also a late-arriving sense of identity that gives this junk-food sequel just enough nutritional value to help its young audiences reconsider how to determine their own post-high school priorities."
