= Joel Courtney =

American actor (born 1996)

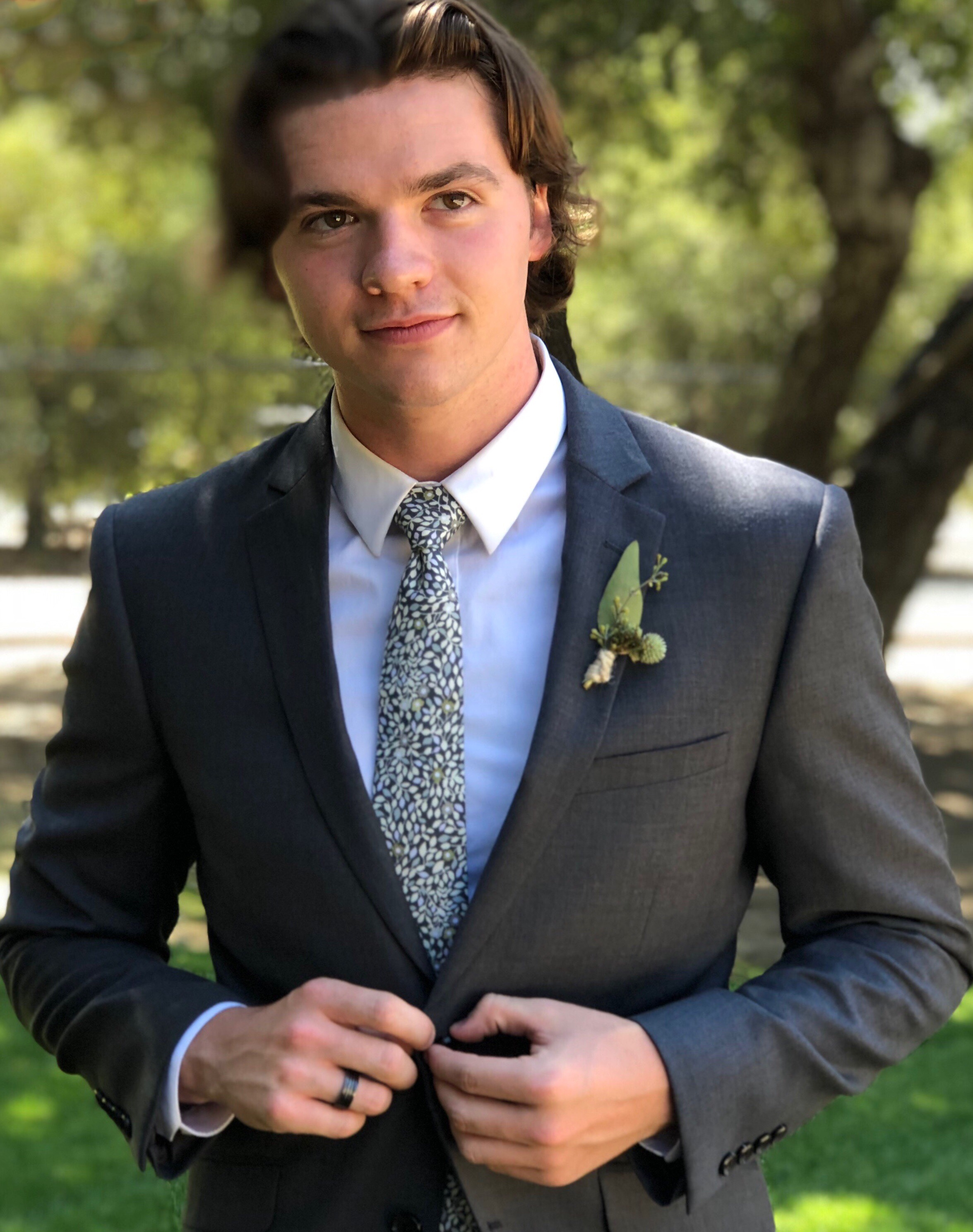
- Courtney in 2018
- Born: January 31, 1996 (age 30); Monterey, California, U.S.
- Occupation: Actor
- Years active: 2010–present
- Spouse: Mia Scholink (m. 2020)

Joel Courtney (born January 31, 1996) is an American actor known for his role in the 2011 film Super 8 and for his starring role in Netflix's The Kissing Booth film series.

== Early life and education ==
Courtney was born in Monterey, California, on January 31, 1996, and was raised in Moscow, Idaho, where he attended Logos School, a Classical Christian school. While still living in Idaho, Courtney took a trip to Los Angeles during the first week of his summer school break in 2010, where he hoped to be in a commercial and make $100.

== Career ==
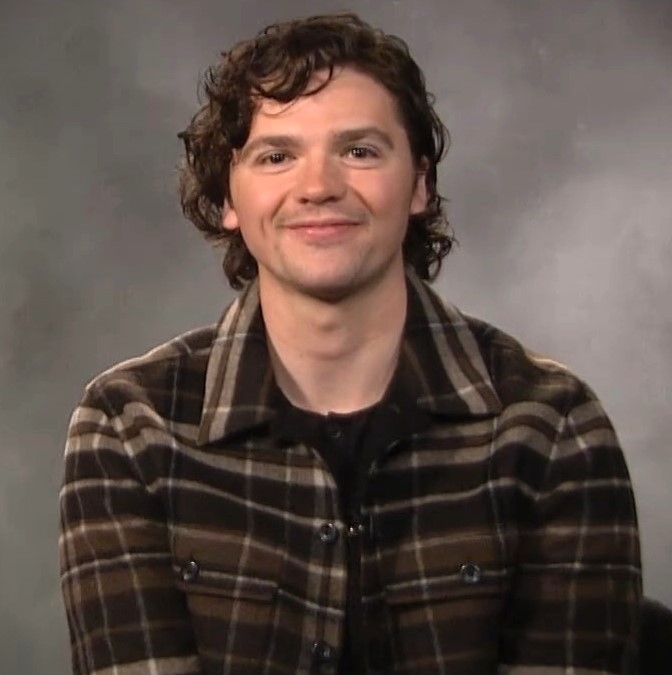
Courtney discusses Jesus Revolution in 2023

Casting director Patti Kalles advised Courtney to audition for Paramount Pictures' Super 8 (2011). After 11 callbacks, Courtney landed the starring role of Joe Lamb in the film. At the 2012 Saturn Awards, Courtney won the award for Best Performance by a Younger Actor.

In August 2011, Courtney filmed Tom Sawyer & Huckleberry Finn (2014) in Bulgaria, playing the part of Tom Sawyer.

In 2012, Courtney filmed the supernatural thriller Don't Let Me Go (2016), playing a disgruntled teen who joins his father on a camping trip only to have a run-in with otherworldly forces. That same year, he appeared in the Fox TV movie Rogue.

In November 2012, Courtney was cast in the Stephen King film Mercy, which was released direct-to-video in 2014.

In 2013, Courtney was cast in the direct-to-video indie films Dear Eleanor (2016) and Sins of our Youth (2016).

Courtney appeared in the lead ensemble of the CW Television Network series The Messengers, which was cancelled during its single 2014–15 season.

In 2016, Courtney had a one-episode role in the third season of Agents of S.H.I.E.L.D. as Nathaniel Malick.

Courtney played the lead in the indie project The River Thief (2016), directed by N. D. Wilson. In 2015, Courtney joined the cast of the indie film Replicate and, in 2016, joined the cast of the indie film F the Prom. In 2018, he starred in the Netflix film The Kissing Booth, a role he reprised in the film's 2020 sequel The Kissing Booth 2. Courtney also reprised his Kissing Booth role in the series' third film, The Kissing Booth 3, released in 2021.

In 2020, Courtney was cast in Lionsgate's Jesus Revolution, released in 2023.

== Personal life ==
On February 14, 2020, he proposed to his longtime girlfriend, Mia Scholink. He married Scholink on September 27, 2020.

Courtney's favorite book series are 100 Cupboards and Ashtown Burials, both by N. D. Wilson, who directed the 2016 film The River Thief, which Courtney starred in, and whose father, Doug Wilson, founded the school Courtney attended as a child.

== Filmography ==
=== Film ===
Year	Title	Role
2011	Super 8	Joe Lamb
2012	Spare Time Killers	Young Tony
2013	Don't Let Me Go	Nick Madsen
2014	Mercy	Buddy Bruckner
2014	Sins of Our Youth	David
2014	Tom Sawyer & Huckleberry Finn	Tom Sawyer
2016	Dear Eleanor	Billy Hobgood
2016	The River Thief	Diz
2017	F the Prom	Cole Reed
2018	Assimilate	Zach Henderson
2018	The Kissing Booth	Lee Flynn
2020	The Kissing Booth 2	Lee Flynn
2020	The Empty Man	Brandon Maibum
2021	The Kissing Booth 3	Lee Flynn
2022	Sick	Tyler Murphy
2023	Jesus Revolution	Greg Laurie
2024	Players	Little
2025	Soul on Fire	John O'Leary
2026	40 Dates and 40 Nights	Mason

=== Television ===
Year	Title	Role	Notes
2011	The Haunting Hour: The Series	John Westmore	Episodes: "Creature Feature (Part 1)" and "Creature Feature (Part 2)"
2012	Rogue	Griffin Jones	Television film
2015	The Messengers	Peter Moore	Main cast
2016	Agents of S.H.I.E.L.D.	Nathaniel Malick	Episode: "Paradise Lost"
2017	APB	Luke	Episode: "Daddy's Home"
2019	Double Dare	Himself	Contestant
2020	Group Chat with Annie & Jayden	Himself	Episode: "Would You Rather Kiss"
2026	The Rookie	Kevin Kelvin	Episode: "Fast Andy"

== Awards and nominations ==
Year	Award	Category	Work	Result
2011	Phoenix Film Critics Society Awards	Best Ensemble Acting	Super 8	Won
2011	Phoenix Film Critics Society Awards	Best Performance by a Youth in a Lead or Supporting Role - Male	Super 8	Nominated
2011	Teen Choice Awards	Choice Movie: Chemistry	Super 8	Nominated
2011	Teen Choice Awards	Choice Movie: Male Breakout Star	Super 8	Nominated
2012	BAM Awards	Best Performance by a Child Actor	Super 8	Nominated
2012	Coming of Age Awards	Best Newcomer	Super 8	Nominated
2012	Saturn Awards	Best Performance by a Young Actor	Super 8	Won
2012	YouReviewer Awards	Breakthrough Actor	Super 8	Nominated
2012	Young Artist Awards	Best Performance in a Feature Film - Leading Young Actor	Super 8	Nominated
2012	Young Artist Awards	Best Performance in a Feature Film - Young Ensemble Cast	Super 8	Nominated
2024	Movieguide Awards	Best Movie for Mature Audiences	Jesus Revolution	Won
2024	Movieguide Awards	Epiphany Prize for Most Inspiring Movie	Jesus Revolution	Nominated
