= The Kissing Booth 2 =

2020 film by Vince Marcello

- Promotional release poster
- Directed by: Vince Marcello
- Screenplay by: Vince Marcello; Jay Arnold
- Based on: The Kissing Booth by Beth Reekles
- Produced by: Ed Glauser; Andrew Cole-Bulgin; Vince Marcello; Michele Weisler
- Starring: Joey King; Joel Courtney; Jacob Elordi; Taylor Zakhar Perez; Maisie Richardson-Sellers; Meganne Young; Molly Ringwald
- Cinematography: Anastas Michos
- Edited by: Paul Millspaugh
- Music by: Patrick Kirst
- Production companies: Picture Loom Productions; Clearblack Films; Komixx Entertainment
- Distributed by: Netflix
- Release date: July 24, 2020
- Running time: 131 minutes
- Country: United States
- Language: English

The Kissing Booth 2 is a 2020 American teen romantic comedy film directed by Vince Marcello and written by Marcello and Jay Arnold. As a direct sequel to the 2018 film The Kissing Booth and the second installment in the Kissing Booth trilogy (itself based on The Kissing Booth books by Beth Reekles), the film stars Joey King, Joel Courtney and Jacob Elordi.

The film was released on July 24, 2020, by Netflix. Like its predecessor, the film received generally negative reviews from critics. A third installment was released on August 11, 2021.

== Plot ==
Elle's senior year begins with classmates gossiping that she and Noah are breaking up. This makes her fear elevate as Noah has befriended an attractive British girl named Chloe on Instagram.

Elle and Lee are planning the kissing booth again for the Charity Fair. So, he is trying to convince her to ask Marco Peña, the new transfer student dubbed the new "Noah Flynn," to be one of the kissers. Beating Marco on the dancing game, she forces him to participate in the booth.

Noah suggests Elle apply to Harvard, which clashes with her lifelong plan to study at University of California, Berkeley with Lee (where their moms met and became best friends). So, Elle does it secretly. Talking with her father about college tuition, Elle learns money is a problem, so decides to participate with Lee in a dance competition with a huge cash reward for first place.

Elle visits Noah in Boston, meeting his new friends and Chloe, making her even more insecure. Finding Chloe's earring under Noah's bed causes her to leave Boston early. Confronting Noah, he assures her nothing has happened between him and Chloe and asks her to trust him, though she is still skeptical.

Lee slips during one of their practice sessions (later revealed to be fake) so proposes that Marco become her dance partner, which she is not too happy about, but eventually does. As Marco and Elle start spending time together, they grow closer, and an attraction starts to develop between them.

Unbeknownst to Elle, Lee is having problems with Rachel, as Elle goes everywhere with them so does not give them alone time. After forgetting Rachel waiting at the movies, she asks Lee to talk with Elle, which he promises but never does. The Halloween Dance arrives, and Lee forgets to tell Rachel they changed costumes (Rachel was a marshmallow while Lee and Elle were going to be graham crackers making a s'more), further upsetting her. Elle shares a dance with Marco, almost kissing him but she stops the kiss when she realises that the OMG’s are watching and judging.

Lee finds Elle's application to Harvard in his car trunk, angering him. Elle and Marco excel at their competition performance, and she kisses him at the end of their dance, not knowing Noah was in the crowd, causing him to exit quickly.

At Thanksgiving dinner at the Flynn's, Noah brings Chloe, which upsets Elle. Lee then confronts her for not telling him about her application to Harvard and Rachel is also upset with her. When Rachel discovers Lee never spoke with Elle she leaves. When he catches up with her, Rachel breaks up with him. Elle unsuccessfully tries to convince Rachel to reconcile with Lee. She also returns the earring to Chloe, who confirms it is hers. Later on, Chloe confesses to Noah she had slept in his room one night when he was away so must have lost it then.

The carnival day arrives, and Lee and Rachel reconcile after being blindfolded and kiss at the kissing booth. Elle is also blindfolded and is approached by Marco, who wants to talk with her about their feelings. Although she admits they have chemistry, she tells him she loves Noah and goes looking for him at the airport.

At LAX, Chloe tells Elle that Noah went looking for her, and she finds him in the park where they first kissed. He confesses he was embarrassed as he initially was not doing as well at Harvard as he had hoped. Noah also wants a connection with Chloe like Elle has with Lee. They then make up.

A few months later Noah returns, and Elle, Lee, and Rachel graduate. Lee shares with Elle that he was accepted at Berkeley and asks if she received a response. She tells them she was waitlisted at both Berkeley and Harvard. When Elle opens both envelopes in her room, it turns out she was accepted to both universities, so she has to make a decision: go to Harvard with Noah or Berkeley with Lee.

== Cast ==
- Joey King as Elle Evans
- Joel Courtney as Lee Flynn
- Jacob Elordi as Noah Flynn
- Taylor Zakhar Perez as Marco Valentin Peña
- Maisie Richardson-Sellers as Chloe Winthrop
- Molly Ringwald as Mrs. Flynn
- Meganne Young as Rachel
- Stephen Jennings as Mike Evans
- Chloe Williams as Joni Evans
- Morné Visser as Mr. Flynn
- Bianca Bosch as Olivia
- Zandile Madliwa as Gwyneth
- Camilla Wolfson as Mia
- Carson White as Brad Evans
- Judd Krok as Ollie
- Frances Sholto-Douglas as Vivian
- Evan Hengst as Miles
- Sanda Shandu as Randy
- Hilton Pelser as Barry
- Trent Rowe as Melvin
- Michelle Allen as Heather
- Joshua Eddy as Tuppen
- Nathan Lynn as Cameron
- Byron Langley as Warren
- David Morin as Principal Morin

== Production ==
In February 2019, it was announced Joey King, Joel Courtney and Jacob Elordi would reprise their roles, with Vince Marcello directing from a screenplay he wrote alongside Jay Arnold, with Netflix distributing. In May 2019, Maisie Richardson-Sellers and Taylor Zakhar Perez joined the cast of the film, with Meganne Young, Carson White and Molly Ringwald reprising their roles.

Principal photography concluded in August 2019, taking place in South Africa.

== Release ==
=== Streaming ===
The film was released on July 24, 2020 on Netflix. It was the top-streamed film in its opening weekend, while the first film ranked third. It placed second in its sophomore weekend, with Forbes noting it as "one of the most popular movies ever on the platform." In October 2020, Netflix reported 66 million households watched the film over its first four weeks of release.

== Reception ==
=== Critical response ===
On review aggregator Rotten Tomatoes, the film holds an approval rating of 27% based on 41 reviews, with an average rating of 4.3/10. The website's critics consensus reads: "Joey King makes The Kissing Booth 2 better than it could have been, but this slapdash sequel will leave viewers puckering up for all the wrong reasons." On Metacritic, the film has a weighted average score of 39 out of 100, based on 12 critics, indicating "generally unfavorable" reviews.

IndieWire's Kate Erbland gave it a grade C+, and wrote: "While it offers some necessary growth for all of its characters, The Kissing Booth 2 can never resist looking and acting like dozens of other offerings of its genre ilk, unable to grow beyond basic complications and done-to-death dramas. And yet there are hints that its evolution has a few more tricks left to employ, its winking conclusion only one of them." Clarisse Loughrey of The Independent gave the film a score of 2 out of 5 stars, writing: "To The Kissing Booth 2’s credit, it’s not as aggressively problematic as its predecessor."

Adam Graham of The Detroit News gave the film a grade of B, writing that the film "is a sun-kissed fantasy with an appealing cast and a slick presentation that provides an easy escape, and that's OK, too." Robyn Bahr of The Hollywood Reporter wrote that the film "wades into the quagmire of what happens when the glow fades from a new relationship", and concluded: "As I might have said during my own high school days, The Kissing Booth 2 is “mad stupid,” but it’s still not as overtly slappable as Netflix’s other low-budget teen comedies."

== Sequel ==
The Kissing Booth 3 was released on Netflix worldwide on Wednesday, August 11, 2021 at 12am PT and 3am ET in the US.
