= The Kissing Booth =

2018 American teen romantic comedy film

- Promotional release poster
- Directed by: Vince Marcello
- Written by: Vince Marcello
- Based on: The Kissing Booth by Beth Reekles
- Produced by: Ed Glauser; Andrew Cole-Bulgin; Vince Marcello; Michele Weisler
- Starring: Joey King; Joel Courtney; Jacob Elordi; Meganne Young; Molly Ringwald
- Cinematography: Anastas Michos
- Edited by: Paul Millspaugh
- Music by: Patrick Kirst
- Production company: Komixx Entertainment
- Distributed by: Netflix
- Release date: May 11, 2018
- Running time: 105 minutes
- Country: United States
- Language: English

The Kissing Booth is a 2018 American teen romantic comedy film written and directed by Vince Marcello, based on the 2012 novel of the same name by Beth Reekles. It stars Joey King, Jacob Elordi, and Joel Courtney. The film follows Elle (King), a quirky, late blooming teenager whose budding romance with high school senior and bad boy Noah (Elordi) puts her lifelong friendship with Noah's younger brother Lee (Courtney) in jeopardy.

The Kissing Booth was released on Netflix on May 11, 2018, and was dubbed a commercial success by the service due to it being widely viewed by subscribers, leading to the eventual production of a trilogy of films. The film was largely panned by critics, who deemed its storyline and themes to be clichéd. A sequel, The Kissing Booth 2, was released on July 24, 2020, and the third film, The Kissing Booth 3, was released on August 11, 2021.

== Plot ==
In Los Angeles, Elle Evans and Lee Flynn have been best friends since birth. When she is 11, her mother becomes ill and dies three years later. Elle's secret crush on Lee's popular older brother Noah deepens, which she suppresses.

On the first day of her junior year in high school, Elle is forced to wear a too-small skirt. When fellow student Tuppen touches her inappropriately, Noah begins fighting with him. Tuppen, Noah, and Elle are given detention, where Tuppen apologizes. Elle later agrees to go on a date with him, but he stands her up, as Noah has warned everyone not to pursue her.

Elle and Lee propose having a kissing booth as a school fundraiser. At a party, she tells the popular OMG girls (Olivia, Mia, and Gwyneth) that Noah will be part of the booth, despite him having already refused to participate.

The kissing booth goes well until Noah is meant to participate but Lee takes his place, disappointing the girls. A classmate, Rachel, steps up to kiss him, and the two leave Elle to staff the booth. Annoyed with Elle, the OMG girls set her up to kiss an undesirable student. At the last second, the student waves Noah ahead. He kisses the blindfolded Elle, and when she realizes it is him, they kiss again in front of everyone.

Noah offers Elle a ride on his motorcycle, and rain forces them to take shelter in a gazebo. There, she kisses him, but then tells him she refuses to be just another sexual conquest. Hurt, Noah reveals he has feelings for her.

At a beach party, Warren tries to get a resistant Elle into a hot tub. Noah defends her, Warren taunts him, so Noah attacks him while Elle escapes. Noah catches up to her and gives her a ride home. He apologizes for his violent reaction to Warren's slight. They detour to the Hollywood Sign and have sex for the first time. There, they establish rules for their relationship, with the principal aim that Lee not find out they are together until Elle figures out how to tell him.

Noah swears Elle to secrecy when she discovers he has been accepted at Harvard University.

While helping Noah fix his motorcycle, Elle cuts her face. Lee finds Noah cleaning the wound and accuses him of hurting her. When Lee asks Elle if she and Noah are dating, she says they are not. After agreeing to tell Lee the truth, he walks in on them kissing.

Furious that Elle has broken an important friendship rule, Lee runs to his car, saying their friendship was the one thing his brother never had and that now he has nothing; he then drives off. Elle lashes out at Noah, blaming him for exposing their relationship, so he leaves on his motorcycle.

Noah risks not graduating by being absent from school for the next few weeks. Lee completely ignores Elle. Finally, she sees Lee at the arcade, where he invites her to dance with him, and they reconcile.

Elle goes to prom with Lee and Rachel, whom he is now dating. Huge black and white photographs adorn the walls of Memory Lane, a special prom exhibit, including the photos of the kissing booth. Noah emerges from the back, asking Elle to the stage and declaring his love for her publicly, but she runs away. He apologizes to Lee at home, telling him his feelings for Elle are serious despite the fact he is leaving for Harvard the next day.

At Elle and Lee's birthday costume party the next day, Elle confesses her love for Noah to Lee. He relents, wanting her to be happy and agreeing to help her find Noah. Driving Lee's car, Elle shares her feelings for Noah with "Lee", dressed in his Batman costume, only to discover it is Noah in disguise.

Elle and Noah spend the following weeks together before he leaves for college. Watching him go, she is unsure if their relationship will last, but she knows a part of her heart will always belong to him.

== Cast ==
- Joey King as Elle Evans, lifelong best friend of Lee and girlfriend of Noah.
- Joel Courtney as Lee Flynn, best friend of Elle, Noah's younger brother and Rachel's boyfriend.
- Jacob Elordi as Noah Flynn, Lee's older brother and love interest and eventual boyfriend of Elle.
- Meganne Young as Rachel, Lee's girlfriend.
- Stephen Jennings as Mike Evans, Elle's father.
- Chloe Williams as Joni Evans, Elle's mother.
- Carson White as Brad Evans, Elle's younger brother.
- Molly Ringwald as Sara Flynn, Noah and Lee's mother, and mother figure to Elle.
- Morné Visser as Mr. Flynn, Noah and Lee's father.
- Jessica Sutton as Mia, a popular, mean girl at school who has a crush on Noah. She is the leader of the OMG (Olivia, Mia, Gwyneth) girls.
- Zandile Madliwa as Gwyneth, Mia's friend and one of the OMG girls.
- Bianca Bosch as Olivia, Mia's friend and one of the OMG girls.
- Michelle Allen as Heather, fellow student and Goth girl.
- Joshua Eady as Tuppen, a football player who sexually assaults Elle before asking her out and then standing her up after being threatened with physical harm by Noah.
- Byron Langley as Warren
- Judd Akron as Ollie
- Frances Sholto-Douglas as Vivian
- Evan Hengst as Miles
- Sanda Shandu as Randy
- Hilton Pelser as Barry
- Trent Rowe as Melvin
- Nathan Lynn as Cameron

== Production ==
In June 2014, Vince Marcello was hired to write the film adaptation of teenage author Beth Reekles' young adult novel The Kissing Booth, which was originally published on Wattpad. In November 2016, it was announced that Netflix had purchased rights to the film, and Marcello was set to direct as well. In January 2017, Joey King and Molly Ringwald signed on to star.

Filming took place in Los Angeles, California, and in Cape Town, South Africa, with scenes shot at the University of Cape Town and Ratanga Junction (now closed as of 2018) between January and April 2017.

== Release ==
The film was released on May 11, 2018, on Netflix. According to Netflix, one in three viewers of the film have re-watched it, "which is 30 percent higher than the average movie re-watch rate on the [streaming service]". Deeming the film a substantial success for the service, chief content officer (CCO) Ted Sarandos called it "one of the most-watched movies in the country, and maybe in the world". Upon the sequel's release in July 2020, the first film was the third-most viewed on Netflix that weekend.

== Reception ==
=== Critical response ===
The Kissing Booth was panned by critics. On Rotten Tomatoes, the film has an approval rating of 17% based on 12 reviews, with an average rating of 4.1/10. The website's critics consensus reads: "The Kissing Booth deploys every rom-com cliché in the book with little care given to achieving any real sentiment."

IndieWire's Kate Erbland gave the film a "D" grade, saying that "Unfortunately, the high school-set rom-com is a sexist and regressive look at relationships that highlights the worst impulses of the genre." Ani Bundel of NBC News criticized the film's "problematic stereotyping of masculinity and relationships" and lack of original ideas, writing: "It feels like it was written by someone who simply digested everything she was told 'romance' was supposed to be by the patriarchy, and vomited back at us. Nearly every cliché in the film feels cribbed from another movie, like a song made completely of samples from better-known hits."

Despite being deemed "sexist" and "objectively bad" by several critics, The Kissing Booth was widely consumed among audiences. Netflix's CCO Ted Sarandos affirmed the film's success as a "hugely popular original movie" for the streaming service. Factors that have been cited as reasons for The Kissing Booth's success among audiences include the original novel's popularity on Wattpad, the relative lack of original romantic comedies on the platform, and the publicization of actors King and Elordi's off-screen relationship during the film's production.

=== Accolades ===
At the 2019 Kids' Choice Awards, The Kissing Booth was nominated for Favorite Movie and King won Favorite Actress for her role.

== Sequels ==
On February 14, 2019, a sequel, titled The Kissing Booth 2, was announced. It was released on July 24, 2020, on Netflix.

A third film, The Kissing Booth 3, was announced on July 26, 2020, via livestream. It was filmed directly after the second film, with most of the cast and the crew returning, and released August 11, 2021.
