= Tower Theater (Miami, Florida) =

Movie theater in Miami, Florida, United States

Coordinates: 25°45′56.42″N 80°13′10.07″W

- Premier of "Calzada" at the Tower Theatre in Miami
- Interactive map of Tower Theater
- Location: 1508 SW 8th St Miami, Florida
- Owner: City of Miami
- Type: Indoor theater

Construction
- Opened: December, 1926

MDC's Tower Theater is one of Miami's oldest cultural landmarks. When it opened in December 1926, it was the finest state-of-the-art theater in the South. It is located on SW Eighth Street and Fifteenth Avenue in Miami, Florida.

== History ==
Robdendon Corporation opened this movie theatre to the public as a Wometco first-run-house in December 1926. On October 3, 1931, after extensive remodeling under the leadership of Robert Law Weed, the theatre re-opened its doors. The exterior was developed in an Art Deco style with a prominent 40-foot steel tower that quickly became a neighborhood landmark. The Theater was now a member of Wolfson-Meyer Theatrical Enterprises of Miami.

During the late fifties and throughout the sixties, large numbers of Cuban refugees fled to Miami. The area surrounding S.W. Eighth Street - "Calle Ocho" - became a place of new beginnings. For many Cuban families, films at MDC's Tower Theater were an introduction to American culture in addition to pure entertainment. Soon MDC's Tower Theater altered its programming to include English-language films with Spanish subtitles, and eventually Spanish-language films. However, after almost sixty years of operation, MDC's Tower Theater was closed to the public in 1984.

Following another remodeling in 2002, the Theater was turned over to Miami Dade College. Now under the auspices of Miami Film Festival.

In 2011, USA Today declared MDC's Tower Theater "one of the 10 great places to see a movie in splendor" in the newspaper's round-up of the best old-fashioned movie palaces in America.
