= Joey King =

American actress (born 1999)

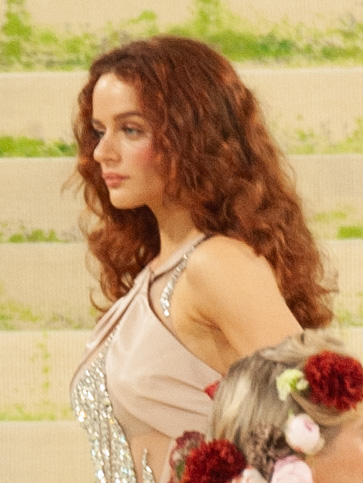
- King in 2026
- Born: Joey Lynn King; July 30, 1999 (age 27); Los Angeles, California, U.S.
- Occupation: Actress
- Years active: 2006–present
- Spouse: Steven Piet (m. 2023)
- Relatives: Hunter King (sister)

Joey Lynn King (born July 30, 1999) is an American actress. She starred as Ramona Quimby in the comedy film Ramona and Beezus (2010) and gained wider recognition for her lead role as a late-blooming teenager in the Kissing Booth film series (2018–2021). King received critical acclaim for playing Gypsy-Rose Blanchard in the crime drama series The Act (2019), for which she was nominated for a Primetime Emmy Award and a Golden Globe Award.

King has also appeared in the films Battle: Los Angeles (2011), Crazy, Stupid, Love (2011), The Dark Knight Rises (2012), The Conjuring (2013), White House Down (2013), Oz the Great and Powerful (2013), Independence Day: Resurgence (2016), and Wish Upon (2017), as well as in the FX black comedy series Fargo (2014–2015). She has since taken on lead roles in the films Bullet Train (2022), The Princess (2022), A Family Affair (2024), Practical Magic 2 (2026), and voice roles in Horton Hears a Who! (2008) and Despicable Me 4 (2024).

== Early life ==
King was born in Los Angeles on July 30, 1999. She has two older sisters, one of whom is actress Hunter King. Her mother is of Jewish descent. King has said, "I'm Jewish, but I'm not really, really religious."

As a child, she sang a cappella for a talent show at the Simi Valley Cultural Arts Center and performed with the Stage Door Children's Theatre in Agoura. King attended Phoenix Ranch School in Simi Valley. King began acting professionally at the age of four in a commercial for Life Cereal. She has also been in commercials for AT&T, Kay Jewelers, and Eggo.

== Career ==
=== 2006–2016: Beginnings and child acting ===
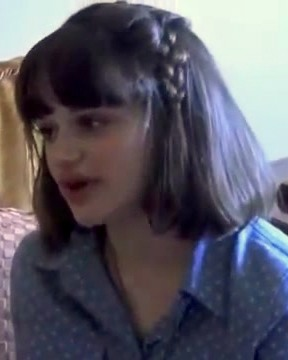
King in 2013

King made her debut in the 2007 film Reign Over Me. In 2008, she voiced the yellow fur ball Katie in the animated feature Horton Hears a Who! and also appeared in Quarantine. In 2010, she guest-starred in the series Ghost Whisperer. She was also featured in The Suite Life of Zack & Cody as Emily Mason in two episodes. Other television appearances include Jericho, Entourage, CSI: Crime Scene Investigation, Medium and Life in Pieces.

King's first lead role was Ramona Quimby in the 2010 film Ramona and Beezus, an adaptation of the Beverly Cleary book series. She also released a single for the movie called "Ramona Blue." Her role in the film won her a Young Artist Award. King was featured in Battle: Los Angeles, where she played a girl named Kirsten. Also in 2011, she co-starred in Crazy, Stupid, Love. She also appeared in Taylor Swift's "Mean" music video as a young student at the school cafeteria rejected by her peers.

King had a role in Christopher Nolan's third Batman film, The Dark Knight Rises (2012), as a young Talia al Ghul. She also filmed the short-lived comedy series Bent, had guest appearances in New Girl and was on the final episode of The Haunting Hour: The Series, "Goodwill Towards Men". In 2013, King appeared in Oz the Great and Powerful, Family Weekend, White House Down, and The Conjuring. In 2014, she appeared in Wish I Was Here, as well as in Fargo as Greta Grimly, daughter of police officer Gus Grimly. In 2016, King was cast in the coming-of-age drama film The Possibility of Fireflies. She played the lead character Clare in the 2017 horror-thriller film Wish Upon. She also had a role in the supernatural horror film Slender Man, which was released in 2018.

=== 2017–present: The Kissing Booth and The Act ===
In 2018, she starred as Elle Evans in Netflix's teen romantic comedy The Kissing Booth. She reprised the role in the sequel The Kissing Booth 2, released in 2020, and in The Kissing Booth 3, which was released on August 11, 2021. In 2019, she starred in the true crime anthology television series The Act on Hulu. King was cast as Gypsy Rose Blanchard, a role which required King to shave her head for the third time in her career. Her performance in The Act earned her nominations for Emmy, Golden Globe, SAG and Critics' Choice awards. She also appeared on the fourth season of the CBS comedy Life in Pieces as Morgan.

King is represented by WME and Brillstein Entertainment Partners. In August 2020, she signed a deal with Hulu to produce television content for its service. In July 2021, her All The King's Horses production company struck a deal with Netflix. She appeared as Halina Kurc in the Hulu Original Series We Were the Lucky Ones. In 2024, King starred in Netflix's film A Family Affair. In 2023, she made another appearance in a Taylor Swift music video – this time for her song "I Can See You (Taylor's Version) [From The Vault]" for the re-recording of Swift's 2010 album Speak Now.

== Personal life ==
King began a relationship with producer and director Steven Piet in 2019 after they met on the set of The Act. They became engaged in February 2022 and married on September 2, 2023, in Mallorca, Spain.

In 2023, King praised the Israeli judicial reform protests on Instagram. In May, she had the word "hummus" tattooed in Hebrew on the back of her neck during a visit to Tel Aviv. That October, King signed the "No Hostage Left Behind" letter, an open letter asking US President Joe Biden to ensure the release of hostages taken by Hamas during the October 7 attacks.

== Filmography ==
Key
†	Denotes films that have not yet been released

=== Film ===
Year	Title	Role	Notes
2008	Horton Hears a Who!	Katie (voice)	
2008	Quarantine	Briana	
2010	Ramona and Beezus	Ramona Quimby	
2011	Battle: Los Angeles	Kirsten	
2011	Crazy, Stupid, Love	Molly Weaver	
2012	The Dark Knight Rises	Young Talia al Ghul	
2013	The Conjuring	Christine Perron	
2013	Family Weekend	Lucinda Smith-Dungy	
2013	Oz the Great and Powerful	China Girl / Girl in wheelchair	
2013	White House Down	Emily Cale	
2014	The Boxcar Children	Jessie Alden (voice)	
2014	The Sound and the Fury	Miss Quentin	
2014	Wish I Was Here	Grace Bloom	
2015	Borealis	Aurora	
2015	Stonewall	Phoebe Winters	
2016	Independence Day: Resurgence	Sam Blackwell	
2017	Going in Style	Brooklyn Harding	
2017	Smartass	Freddie	
2017	Wish Upon	Clare Shannon	
2018	The Boxcar Children: Surprise Island	Jessie Alden (voice)	
2018	The Kissing Booth	Elle Evans	
2018	The Lie	Kayla Logan	
2018	Radium Girls	Bessie Cavallo	
2018	Summer '03	Jamie Winkle	
2018	Slender Man	Wren	
2019	Zeroville	Zazi	
2020	The Kissing Booth 2	Elle Evans	Also executive producer
2021	The Kissing Booth 3	Elle Evans	Also executive producer
2022	The In Between	Tessa	Also producer
2022	The Princess	The Princess	Also executive producer
2022	Bullet Train	Malen'kiy Prints / The Prince	
2024	Despicable Me 4	Poppy Prescott (voice)	
2024	Camp	Sarah	Also co-producer
2024	A Family Affair	Zara Ford	
2024	Uglies	Tally Youngblood	Also executive producer
2026	Practical Magic 2	Kylie Owens	

=== Television ===
Year	Title	Role	Notes
2006	Malcolm in the Middle	Girl at party	Episode: "Mono"
2006	The Suite Life of Zack & Cody	Emily Mason	Episodes: "Day Care", "Books and Birdhouses"
2006–2007	Jericho	Sally	3 episodes
2007	Avenging Angel	Amelia	Television film
2007	Backyards & Bullets	Junie Garrison	Television film
2007	Entourage	Chuck Liddell's daughter	Episode: "Gotcha"
2007–2008	CSI: Crime Scene Investigation	Little Girl / Nora Rowe	Episodes: "Living Doll", "Woulda, Coulda, Shoulda"
2008	Medium	Kelly Mackenzie (age 8)	Episode "Drowned World"
2009	Anatomy of Hope	Lucy Morgan	Television film
2010	Elevator Girl	Paige	Television film
2010	Ghost Whisperer	Cassidy	Episodes: "Old Sins Cast Long Shadows", "The Children's Parade"
2011	Bent	Charlie Meyers	Main role
2011	Survivor: South Pacific	Herself	Episode: "Reunion"
2012	New Girl	Brianna	Episode: "Bully"
2013–2014	The Haunting Hour: The Series	Carla / Missy Jordan	Episodes: "Seance", "Goodwill Toward Men"
2014	American Dad!	N/A (voice)	Episode: "Familyland"
2014	Outlaw Prophet: Warren Jeffs	Elissa Wall	Television film
2014–2015	Fargo	Greta Grimly	Recurring role (season 1); special guest role (season 2)
2016	The Flash	Frankie Kane / Magenta	Episode: "Magenta"
2016	Robot Chicken	Polly Pocket / Draculaura (voices)	Episode: "Yogurt in a Bag"
2016	Tween Fest	Maddisyn Crawford	Main role
2019	The Act	Gypsy-Rose Blanchard	Main role
2019	Life in Pieces	Morgan	Recurring Role
2020	Creepshow	Blake (voice)	Episode: "A Creepshow Animated Special"
2020	Home Movie: The Princess Bride	Grandson	Episode: "Chapter Eight: Ultimate Suffering"
2020	Group Chat	Herself	Episode: "Would You Rather Kiss"
2020	The Simpsons	Addy (voice)	Episode: "The Hateful Eight-Year-Olds"
2021	Calls	Skylar (voice)	Episode: "Mom"
2021	Nailed It	Herself	Episode: "Travel Dos and Donuts"
2022–2025	Hamster & Gretel	Fred Grant (voice)	Main role
2024	We Were the Lucky Ones	Halina Kurc	

=== Video games ===
Year	Title	Role
2018	Madden NFL 19: Longshot	Loretta Cruise

=== Music videos ===
Year	Song	Artist
2010	"Ramona Blue"	Joey King featuring Kelli King
2011	"Mean"	Taylor Swift
2018	"Sue Me"	Sabrina Carpenter
2019	"Tongue Tied"	Marshmello, Yungblud, and Blackbear
2023	"I Can See You"	Taylor Swift

== Awards and nominations ==
Year	Award	Category	Work	Result	Ref.
2009	Young Artist Awards	Best Performance in a TV Series – Guest Starring Young Actress	CSI: Crime Scene Investigation	Nominated	
2009	Young Artist Awards	Best Performance in a Voice-Over Role – Young Actress	Horton Hears a Who!	Nominated	
2010	Young Artist Awards	Best Performance in a TV Series (Comedy or Drama) – Supporting Young Actress	Anatomy of Hope	Nominated	
2010	Young Artist Awards	Best Performance in a Voice-Over Role – Young Actor/Actress	Ice Age: Dawn of the Dinosaurs	Nominated	
2011	Young Artist Awards	Best Performance in a Feature Film – Leading Young Actress Ten and Under	Ramona and Beezus	Won	
2011	Young Artist Awards	Best Performance in a TV Series – Guest Starring Young Actress Ten and Under	Ghost Whisperer	Nominated	
2013	Young Artist Awards	Best Performance in a Feature Film – Supporting Young Actress	The Dark Knight Rises	Nominated	
2014	Gotham Independent Film Awards	Breakthrough Actor	Wish I Was Here	Nominated	
2019	Kids' Choice Awards	Favorite Movie Actress	The Kissing Booth	Won	
2019	Primetime Emmy Awards	Outstanding Lead Actress in a Limited or Anthology Series or Movie	The Act	Nominated	
2019	Satellite Awards	Best Actress in a Miniseries or Television Film	The Act	Nominated	
2020	Golden Globe Awards	Best Actress in a Miniseries or Motion Picture Made for Television	The Act	Nominated	
2020	Critics' Choice Television Awards	Best Actress in a Limited Series or Movie Made for Television	The Act	Nominated	
2020	Screen Actors Guild Awards	Outstanding Performance by a Female Actor in a Miniseries or Television Movie	The Act	Nominated	
2020	People's Choice Awards	Comedy Movie Star of 2020	The Kissing Booth 2	Won	
2022	People's Choice Awards	Female Movie Star of 2022	Bullet Train	Nominated	
2022	People's Choice Awards	Action Movie Star of 2022	Bullet Train	Nominated	
2023	Critics' Choice Super Awards	Best Actress in an Action Movie	Bullet Train	Nominated	
2023	Critics' Choice Super Awards	Best Actress in an Action Movie	The Princess	Nominated	
2023	Critics' Choice Super Awards	Best Villain in a Movie	Bullet Train	Nominated	
2024	Astra TV Awards	Best Actress in a Limited Series or TV Movie	We Were The Lucky Ones	Nominated	

At the 2015 Vancouver International Film Festival, the Canadian Images features jury made an honourable mention recognizing King as an Emerging Actress for her performance in Borealis.
