= Filmapalooza =

Filmapalooza is the finale festival for the 48 Hour Film Project in which the winning films from cities worldwide (125 cities as of 2023) are screened the following year and compete with each other for awards. It has existed since 2003.

Filmapalooza is hosted by a different city each year. The upcoming Filmapalooza, in 2025, will be held in Seattle, Washington.

== Filmapalooza events ==
Event	Dates	Location
Filmapalooza 2003	March 13, 2003	Austin, Texas
Filmapalooza 2004	March 12–March 14, 2004	San Jose, California
Filmapalooza 2005	March 11–March 13, 2005	San Jose, California
Filmapalooza 2006	March 9–March 12, 2006	Albuquerque, New Mexico
Filmapalooza 2007	March 8–March 11, 2007	San Jose, California
Filmapalooza 2008	February 29–March 2, 2008	San Jose, California
Filmapalooza 2009	March 13–March 15, 2009	Miami, Florida
Filmapalooza 2010	April 10–April 12, 2010	Las Vegas, Nevada
Filmapalooza 2011	March 10–March 13, 2011	Miami, Florida
Filmapalooza 2012	March 2–March 5, 2012	Taos, New Mexico
Filmapalooza 2013	March 7–March 10, 2013	Hollywood, California
Filmapalooza 2014	March 6–March 10, 2014	New Orleans, Louisiana
Filmapalooza 2015	February 26–March 1, 2015	Hollywood, California
Filmapalooza 2016	March 2–March 5, 2016	Atlanta, Georgia
Filmapalooza 2017	March 1–March 4, 2017	Seattle, Washington
Filmapalooza 2018	March 6–March 9, 2018	Paris, France
Filmapalooza 2019	March 6–March 9, 2019	Orlando, Florida
Filmapalooza 2020	March 3–March 7, 2020	Rotterdam, Netherlands
Filmapalooza 2021	March, 2021	online
Filmapalooza 2022	March 9-March 12, 2022	Washington D.C., USA
Filmapalooza 2023	March 15-March 18, 2023	Los Angeles, California
Filmapalooza 2024	March 20-March 23, 2024	Lisbon, Portugal
Filmapalooza 2025	March 19-March 22, 2025	Seattle, Washington

== Winners ==
=== Best film ===
Year	Film	City/County	Country
2003	White Bitch Down	Atlanta	USA
2004	Baggage	Los Angeles	USA
2005	Moved	Atlanta	USA
2006	Mimes on the Prairie	Des Moines	USA
2007	Tooth and Nail	Portland	USA
2008	TimeCatcher	Tel Aviv	Israel
2009	Transfert	Paris	France
2010	Nicht nur der Himmel ist blau	Berlin	Germany
2011	The Girl Is Mime	London	United Kingdom
2012	In Captivity	Hampton Roads	USA
2013	Jacques Serres	Paris	France
2014	Geen Klote!	Amsterdam	Netherlands
2015	These Dirty Words	Rotterdam	Netherlands
2016	Unforgettable	Amsterdam	Netherlands
2017	Marginaux	Côte d'Azur	France
2018	La Grand Ourse	Clermont-Ferrand	France
2019	Sonrisita	Côte d'Azur	France
2020	Good Catch	Prague	Croatia
2021	La Zone	Montpellier	France
2022	M U Z E	Rotterdam	Netherlands
2023	Threshold	Jacksonville	USA
2024	Do Outro Laddo	Lisbon	Portugal

== See also ==
- List of film festivals
- 48 Hour Film Project
