= Maisie Richardson-Sellers =

English actress (born 1992/1993)

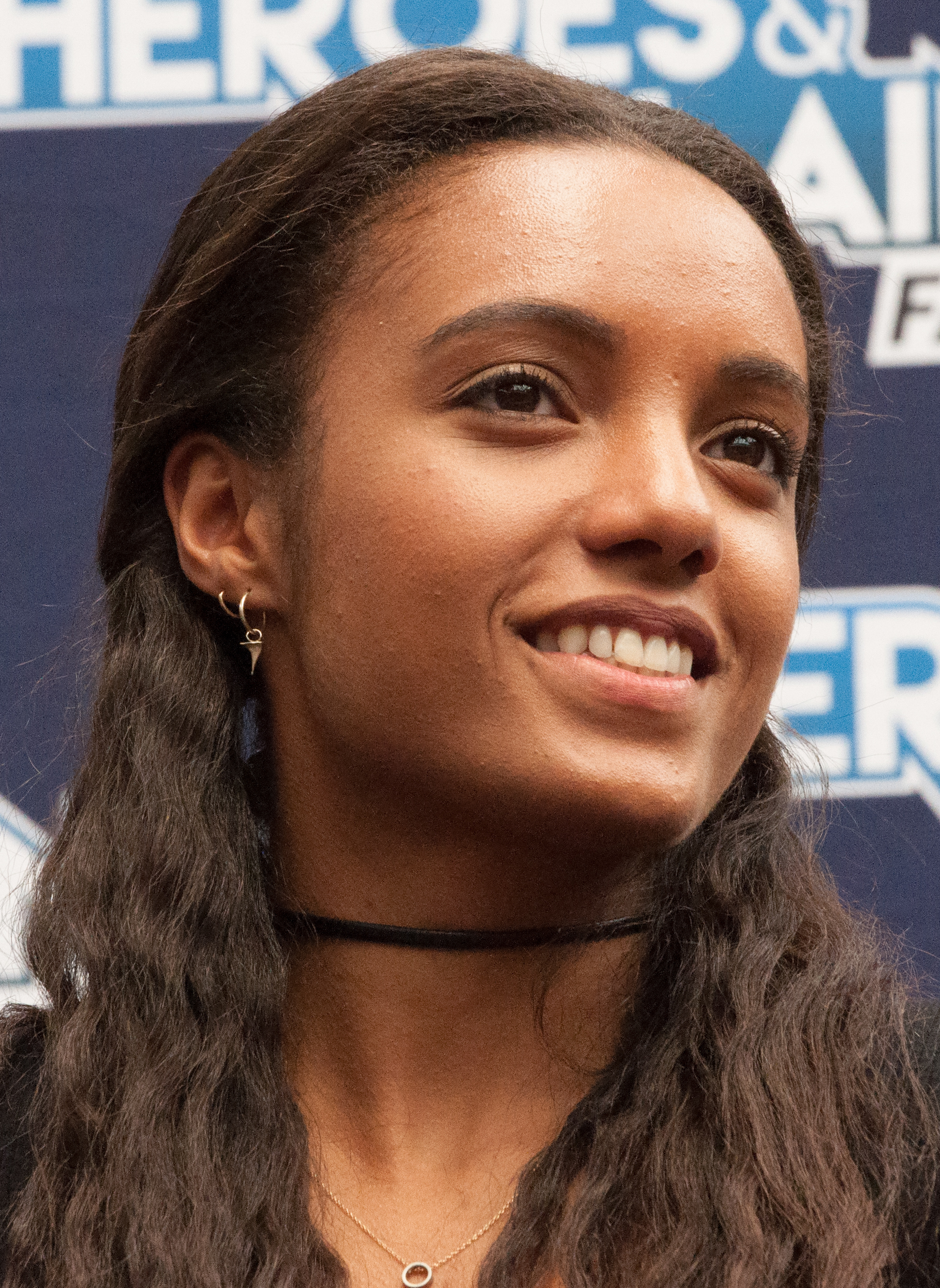
- Richardson-Sellers in 2017
- Born: 1992 or 1993 (age 32–33); London, England
- Education: Hertford College, University of Oxford (2013)
- Occupation: Actress
- Years active: 2011–present

Maisie Richardson-Sellers (born 1992 or 1993) is a British actress and director. She first gained recognition for her role as Rebekah Mikaelson / Eva Sinclair on The CW series The Originals. She has since gained wider recognition for her starring roles as Kathy Freeman in CH4/Peacock's The Undeclared War, Chloe Winthrop in Netflix's The Kissing Booth 2, as well as the third installment in the franchise. She also played both Amaya Jiwe / Vixen and Charlie on The CW superhero series DC's Legends of Tomorrow, and Korr Sella in Star Wars: The Force Awakens.

== Early life and education ==
Maisie Richardson-Sellers was born and raised in London. Her mother Joy Richardson is black Guyanese and her father is white British. She comes from a family of stage actors.

She grew up attending private schools through bursaries and scholarships.

In 2013, Richardson-Sellers graduated, with a degree in archaeology and anthropology, from Hertford College, University of Oxford, where she participated in and directed several plays, including Mephisto and There Will Be Red.

== Career ==
While studying at Oxford University, Richardson-Sellers began directing theatre, including a production of For Colored Girls Who Have Considered Suicide / When the Rainbow Is Enuf. After graduating, she started auditioning, and landed her debut feature film role in the Star Wars sequel Star Wars: The Force Awakens, in the cameo role of Korr Sella.

Richardson-Sellers was then cast as Rebekah Mikaelson in the CW series The Originals in 2014, where the character of Rebekah inhabits a different body after a spell gone wrong. She later played the character of Eva Sinclair on The Originals. Executive producer Michael Narducci praised her performance.

In early March 2015, it was announced that she would play a starring role in Of Kings and Prophets, a short-lived ABC drama series that was filmed in South Africa. In June 2016, it was reported that she would be playing Amaya Jiwe / Vixen on the second season of the CW series Legends of Tomorrow, who is the grandmother of the titular character in the CW Seed animated series Vixen. Her mother guest starred as a distant ancestor of Jiwe on two episodes, "Zari" and "No Country for Old Dads". After two seasons, she was cast in the new role of shapeshifter Charlie. She exited Legends of Tomorrow in 2020 at the end of the series' fifth season.

In 2018 she began shadowing directors on Legends of Tomorrow, and was accepted into the Warner Brothers Directors Program. She then went on to direct two episodes of Legends of Tomorrow.

In May 2019, it was announced that Richardson-Sellers would star in The Kissing Booth 2 as Chloe, directed by Vince Marcello for Netflix. In 2021, Richardson-Sellers then starred in the sequel, The Kissing Booth 3.

In 2021, she co-wrote and directed the short film, Sunday’s Child, which won acclaim at numerous film festivals.

In 2022, Richardson-Sellers starred in the political drama The Undeclared War directed by Peter Kosminsky, opposite Mark Rylance and Simon Pegg.

In June 2023, it was announced that she had been cast in the upcoming season 2 of Nine Perfect Strangers, starring opposite Nicole Kidman, Murray Bartlett, and Liv Ullmann.

=== Production company ===
Richardson-Sellers is the founder of Barefaced Productions, a production company that seeks to tell the stories of, and provide a platform for, marginalised communities and individuals.

== Personal life ==
Richardson-Sellers is queer.

In 2017, along with her Arrowverse co-stars Caity Lotz and Candice Patton, Richardson-Sellers co-founded Shethority ("She + Authority"), an online global collective described as "a positive place for women and the feminine to inspire, empower, and share."

== Filmography ==
Film roles
Year	Title	Role	Notes
2015	Star Wars: The Force Awakens	Korr Sella	Cameo appearance
2020	The Kissing Booth 2	Chloe Winthrop	Streaming film
2021	The Kissing Booth 3	Chloe Winthrop	Streaming film
2023	Jagged Mind	Billie	
2026	Insidious: Out of the Further	Clare	Post-production

Television roles
Year	Title	Role	Notes
2014–2015, 2017	The Originals	Rebekah Mikaelson / Eva Sinclair	Recurring role, 15 episodes
2016	Of Kings and Prophets	Michal	Main role, 9 episodes
2016–2020	Legends of Tomorrow	Amaya Jiwe / Vixen	Main role (season 2–3); 35 episodes
2016–2020	Legends of Tomorrow	Charlie / Clotho	Main role (season 4–5); 29 episodes
2020	Group Chat with Annie & Jayden	Herself	Episode: "Would You Rather Kiss"
2022	The Undeclared War	Kathy Freeman	Main role
2024	Wolf Hall - The Mirror and the Light	Bess Oughtred	Episode: "Defiance" (season 2)
2025	Nine Perfect Strangers	Wolfie	Main cast (season 2)
2025	Talamasca: The Secret Order	Olive Farington	Main role
TBA	The Portrait of a Lady †	Henrietta Stackpole	Upcoming six-part series

Directing
Year	Title	Role	Notes
2021	Sunday's Child	Director, Co-Writer, Producer	Short Film
2021	DC's Legends of Tomorrow	Director	Season 6, EP 14 ‘There Will Be Brood’
2022	DC's Legends of Tomorrow	Director	Season 7, EP 10 ‘The Fixed Point'
