= 48 Hour Film Project =

Short timeline, short film competition since 2001

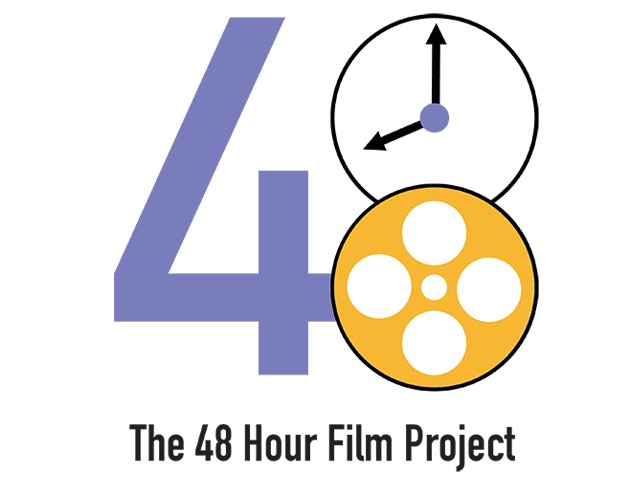
Logo for the 48 Hour Film Project, as of 2020

The 48 Hour Film Project is an annual film competition in which teams of filmmakers are assigned a genre, a character, a prop, and a line of dialogue, and have 48 hours to create a short film containing those elements. The competition has been active since 2001.

In the weeks after the 48 hours of filmmaking are complete, screenings are held in each city and a winner is chosen to represent that city at Filmapalooza—a festival that features "best of" screenings of the winners from each city. Filmapalooza is hosted by a different city each year. The most recent Filmapalooza, in 2024, was held in Lisbon, Portugal.

== Background ==
The competition began in Washington, D.C., in 2001. It was created by Mark Ruppert and is produced by Ruppert and Liz Langston. In 2009, nearly 40,000 filmmakers made around 3,000 films in 76 cities across the globe.

After the 48 hours of filmmaking are complete, each city screens all the competing films, and a jury subsequently vote on the 1st, 2nd, and 3rd best films. Most cities also give out awards to their films in several categories, including directing, writing, and acting; an Audience Choice award is sometimes voted on as well, by the audience of the screenings in each city.

The film that wins 1st place goes on to represent their city at Filmapalooza—a festival that features "best of" screenings of the winners from each city. Filmapalooza is hosted by a different city each year. The most recent Filmapalooza, in 2023, was held in Los Angeles, United States of America.

== Related competitions ==
In 2003, the creators of the 48 Hour Film Project created the National Film Challenge, which is an annual three-day film competition with roughly the same structure as the 48 Hour Film Project, except that the films are mailed in when completed and then screened on-line, rather than being shown in movie theater in the local city.

In 2008, this competition was opened to filmmakers from around the world and although the name was not officially changed, the runner-up hailed from Utrecht, Netherlands.

The organizers of the Auckland competition split off from the 48 Hour Film Project after the 2003 competition and formed 48HOURS, which is now a wholly separate organization that runs a similar competition in New Zealand.

In 2006, the producers of the National Film Challenge began the International Documentary Challenge (also known as the "Doc Challenge") in which participating filmmakers produce a documentary in under five days.

In 2011, 48 Go Green split off from 48 Hour Film Project to become a separate, independent organization. 48 Go Green had a similar style of competition. The primary differences were an ecological theme, and an entirely online competition to allow worldwide participation. 48 Go Green and 48 Hour Film Project parted ways following a disagreement between 48 Hour Film Project and co-producers Francesco Vitali and Christos Siametis. 48 Go Green soon became 48FILM Project.

== List of participating locations ==
All cities listed below have participated every year since their introduction, unless otherwise noted.

=== Starting in 2001 ===
- Washington, District of Columbia

=== Starting in 2002 ===
- Atlanta, Georgia
- Austin, Texas
- Los Angeles, California
- New York City, New York
- Philadelphia, Pennsylvania

=== Starting in 2003 ===
- Auckland, New Zealand (2003 only; became 48HOURS)
- Boston, Massachusetts
- Cincinnati, Ohio
- Nashville, Tennessee
- San Francisco, California

=== Starting in 2004 ===
- Brisbane, Australia (did not participate in 2011)
- Greensboro, North Carolina
- London, England (did not participate from 2005 to 2007)
- Minneapolis, Minnesota
- Portland, Oregon
- San Diego, California
- Sheffield, England (2004 only)
- St. Louis, Missouri

=== Starting in 2005 ===
- Aberdeen, South Dakota (2005 only)
- Asheville, North Carolina
- Baltimore, Maryland
- Black Rock City, Nevada
- Chicago, Illinois
- Denver, Colorado
- Des Moines, Iowa
- Houston, Texas
- Las Vegas, Nevada
- Little Rock, Arkansas
- Miami, Florida
- Paris, France
- Phoenix, Arizona (until 2008)
- Seattle, Washington

=== Starting in 2006 ===
- Albuquerque, New Mexico
- Fargo, North Dakota (did not participate in 2010)
- Louisville, Kentucky
- Portland, Maine
- Providence, Rhode Island

=== Starting in 2007 ===
- Amsterdam, Netherlands
- Berlin, Germany (did not participate in 2010)
- Buffalo, New York
- Cleveland, Ohio
- Dallas, Texas
- Ghent, Belgium (2007 only)
- Hampton Roads
- Honolulu, Hawaii (until 2008)
- Indianapolis, Indiana
- Jacksonville, Florida
- Madison, Wisconsin
- Machinima
- Milwaukee, Wisconsin
- New Orleans, Louisiana
- Pittsburgh, Pennsylvania
- Richmond, Virginia
- Rome, Italy
- Salt Lake City, Utah
- San Antonio, Texas
- San Jose, California
- Tampa-St. Petersburg, Florida
- Tel Aviv, Israel
- Utrecht, Netherlands

=== Starting in 2008 ===
- Athens, Greece (until 2010)
- Columbus, Ohio
- Detroit, Michigan
- Edinburgh, Scotland
- Finland (2008 only)
- Geneva, Switzerland (did not participate in 2010)
- Inland Empire, California
- Kansas City, Missouri
- Melbourne, Australia
- Mumbai, India
- Orlando, Florida
- Singapore
- Sydney, Australia
- Toronto, Ontario

=== Starting in 2009 ===
- Antwerp, Belgium (2009 only)
- Beijing, China
- Breda, Netherlands (until 2011)
- Haifa, Israel (until 2010)
- Hong Kong, China (until 2010)
- Jerusalem (until 2010)
- Lisbon, Portugal
- New Hampshire
- Paducah, Kentucky
- Savannah, Georgia
- Seoul, South Korea (did not participate in 2011)

=== Starting in 2010 ===
- Granada, Spain
- Ho Chi Minh City, Vietnam
- Johannesburg, South Africa
- Kuala Lumpur, Malaysia
- Ulaanbaatar, Mongolia
- Newcastle upon Tyne, England (2010 only)
- Nijmegen, Netherlands
- Tirana, Albania

=== Starting in 2011 ===
- Barcelona, Spain
- Beirut, Lebanon
- Brașov, Romania
- Delhi, India
- Dijon, France
- Dubai, United Arab Emirates
- Glasgow, Scotland
- Hanoi, Vietnam
- Kaohsiung, Taiwan
- Mexico City, Mexico (2011 only)
- New Haven, Connecticut
- Oklahoma City, Oklahoma
- Osaka, Japan
- Prague, Czech Republic
- São Paulo, Brazil (2011 only)
- Seville, Spain
- Shanghai, China
- Warsaw, Poland
- Prague, Czech Republic

=== Starting in 2012 ===
- Amman, Jordan
- Brussels, Belgium
- Cairo, Egypt
- Cape Town, South Africa
- Dundee, Scotland
- Hyderabad, India
- İstanbul, Turkey
- Jackson, Mississippi
- Kraków, Poland
- Lyon, France
- Madrid, Spain
- Málaga, Spain
- Memphis, Tennessee
- Montreal, Quebec
- Renens, Switzerland
- Rotterdam, Netherlands
- Vilnius, Lithuania

=== Starting in 2014 ===
- Willemstad, Curaçao
- Castelo Branco, Portugal
- Charlotte, North Carolina
- Montpellier, France
- Tunis, Tunisie

The competition organizers maintain records online that indicate which cities have participated in past years.

== Awards ==
In each participating city, one participant is chosen as the City Winner and their film is submitted to a jury for consideration against other City Winners for the competition year. The jury's selection from among these films is named the year's winner and is honored at Filmapalooza, the finale festival for the 48 Hour Film Project.

Year	Film	Genre	Team (Director)	Nationality
2002	White Bitch Down	Mystery	Boondogglers; Jon Hill	(United States) Atlanta, Georgia
2003	Baggage	Fantasy	Slapdash Films; Kent Nichols	(United States) Los Angeles, California
2004	Moved	Science fiction	Nice Hat Productions; Scott Ippolito; Jim Issa	(United States) Atlanta, Georgia
2005	Mimes of the Prairie	Musical or Western	Team Last to Enter; John Hansen	(United States) Des Moines, Iowa
2006	Tooth and Nail	Mockumentary	Cinema Syndicate; Sean McGrath	(United States) Portland, Oregon
2007	TimeCatcher	Superhero	No Budget Productions; Amit Saragosi	Tel Aviv, Israel
2008	Transfert	Horror	FatCat Films; Pierre Zandrowicz	Paris, France
2009	Nicht nur der Himmel ist blau	Mockumentary	Sharktankcleaners; Oliver Walser	Berlin, Germany
2010	The Girl Is Mime	Silent film	Far From Home; Tim Bunn	(United Kingdom) London, England
2011	In Captivity	Superhero	Jpixx Films; Jon Abrahams	(United States) Hampton Roads, Virginia
2012	Jacques Serres	Dark comedy	Les Productions avec Volontiers; François Goetghebeur; Nicolas Lebrun	Paris, France
2013	Geen Klote!	Unknown	De Filmband; Jon Karthaus; Melvin Simons	Amsterdam, Netherlands
2014	These Dirty Words	Romance	Jear Productions and The Pitchery; Jens Rijsdijk	Rotterdam, Netherlands
2015	Unforgettable	Fish out of water	Take 23 Marco Grandia	Amsterdam, Netherlands
2021	La Zone	Film de potes	Flying Fish; Harry Grange; Arnaud Jabouin	Montpellier, France

== See also ==
- List of film festivals
- Photomarathon
