= List of science fiction films of the 2020s =

This is a list of science fiction films released in the 2020s. These films include core elements of science fiction, but can cross into other genres. They have been released to a cinema audience by the commercial film industry and are widely distributed with reviews by reputable critics.

== List ==
2020
Title	Director	Cast	Country	Subgenre/Notes
2067	Seth Larney	Kodi Smit-McPhee, Ryan Kwanten	Australia	Mystery
Archive	Gavin Rothery	Theo James, Stacy Martin, Rhona Mitra, Peter Ferdinando, Toby Jones	United Kingdom	Drama Mystery Thriller
Artemis Fowl	Kenneth Branagh	Ferdia Shaw, Lara McDonnell, Josh Gad	United States	Adventure Family Fantasy
Bill & Ted Face the Music	Dean Parisot	Keanu Reeves, Alex Winter, William Sadler	United States	Adventure Comedy Music
Bloodshot	David S. F. Wilson	Vin Diesel, Eiza González, Guy Pearce	United States	Action Adventure
Breach	John Suits	Bruce Willis, Rachel Nichols, Thomas Jane	United States	Action Horror
Color Out of Space	Richard Stanley	Nicolas Cage, Joely Richardson	United States	Horror Mystery Thriller
Cosmoball (a.k.a. Vratar galaktiki)	Dzhanik Fayziev	Yevgeny Romantsov, Viktoriya Agalakova, Maria Lisovaya	Russia	Action Sport
Executive Order (a.k.a. Medida Provisória)	Lázaro Ramos	Alfred Enoch, Taís Araújo, Seu Jorge	Brazil	Drama
Freaks: You're One of Us (a.k.a. Freaks - Du bist eine von uns)	Felix Binder	Finnlay Berger, Thelma Buabeng, Gisa Flake	Germany	Superhero Action Drama Fantasy
Friend of the World	Brian Patrick Butler	Nick Young, Alexandra Slade, Michael C. Burgess, Kathryn Schott, Kevin Smith, Luke Pensabene, Neil Raymond Ricco	United States	Comedy Horror Thriller
How I Became a Superhero	Douglas Attal	Pio Marmaï, Vimala Pons, Benoît Poelvoorde, Leïla Bekhti	France	Comedy Adventure Action Thriller
Intersect	Gus Holwerda	James Morrison, Jason Spisak	United States	Horror Thriller
Invasion (a.k.a. Vtorzhenie)	Fyodor Bondarchuk	Irina Starshenbaum, Rinal Mukhametov, Alexander Petrov	Russia	Action
The Invisible Man	Leigh Whannell	Elisabeth Moss, Oliver Jackson-Cohen	United States	Drama Horror Mystery Thriller
Jiu Jitsu	Dimitri Logothetis	Alain Moussi, Frank Grillo, JuJu Chan, Nicolas Cage	United States	Action Thriller
Justice League Dark: Apokolips War	Matt Peters, Christina Sotta	Jerry O'Connell, Matt Ryan, Jason O'Mara, Taissa Farmiga, Stuart Allan, Tony Todd, Ray Chase, Rosario Dawson, Rainn Wilson	United States	Animation Action Adventure Fantasy
Kill Mode	Thijs Meuwese	Julia Batelaan, Dave Mantel, Yasmin Blake, Cyriel Guds, Ted Neeley	Netherlands	Action Dystopian Superhero
Love and Monsters	Michael Matthews	Dylan O'Brien, Jessica Henwick, Dan Ewing, Ariana Greenblatt, Michael Rooker	United States	Action Adventure Comedy Fantasy
The Midnight Sky	George Clooney	George Clooney, Felicity Jones	United States	Adventure Drama Thriller
Minor Premise	Eric Schultz	Sathya Sridharan, Paton Ashbrook, Dana Ashbrook	United States	Drama Thriller
The New Mutants	Josh Boone	Anya Taylor-Joy, Maisie Williams, Charlie Heaton, Henry Zaga, Blu Hunt	United States	Action Horror Mystery
PG: Psycho Goreman	Steven Kostanski	Nita-Josee Hanna, Owen Myre, Matthew Ninaber	Canada	Comedy Horror
Possessor	Brandon Cronenberg	Christopher Abbott, Andrea Riseborough, Sean Bean	Canada; United Kingdom; United States	Horror Mystery Thriller
Project Power	Ariel Schulman and Henry Joost	Jamie Foxx, Joseph Gordon-Levitt, Dominique Fishback	United States	Action Crime Thriller
Proximity	Eric Demeusy	Ryan Masson, Highdee Kuan, Christian Prentice, Shaw Jones, Don Scribner, Sarah Navratil, Randy Davison	United States	Drama
A Quiet Place Part II	John Krasinski	Emily Blunt, Cillian Murphy	United States	
Skylines a.k.a. Skylin3s	Liam O'Donnell	Lindsey Morgan, Rhona Mitra, Alexander Siddig	United States	Action Adventure
Sonic the Hedgehog	Jeff Fowler	Ben Schwartz, Jim Carrey, James Marsden, Tika Sumpter, Neal McDonough	United States	Action Adventure Comedy Family Fantasy
Sputnik	Egor Abramenko	Oksana Akinshina, Fyodor Bondarchuk, Pyotr Fyodorov	Russia	Drama Horror Mystery Thriller
Superman: Man of Tomorrow	Chris Palmer	Darren Criss, Zachary Quinto, Ike Amadi, Eugene Byrd (all voice)	United States	Animation Action
Superman: Red Son	Sam Liu	Jason Isaacs, Amy Acker, Diedrich Bader, Vanessa Marshall (all voice)	United States	Animation Action
Tenet	Christopher Nolan	John David Washington, Robert Pattinson, Elizabeth Debicki, Dimple Kapadia, Michael Caine, Kenneth Branagh	United Kingdom; United States	Action Thriller
Tiong Bahru Social Club	Tan Bee Thiam	Thomas Pang, Guat Kian Goh, Jalyn Han	Singapore	Comedy
Underwater	William Eubank	Kristen Stewart, Vincent Cassel, Jessica Henwick, John Gallagher Jr., Mamoudou Athie, T.J. Miller	United States	Sci-fi Action Horror
2021
Title	Director	Cast	Country	Subgenre/Notes
Ape vs. Monster	Daniel Lusko	Eric Roberts, Arianna Renee, Katie Sereika, Shayne Hartigan	United States	
Captain Nova	Maurice Trouwborst	Kika van de Vijver, Anniek Pheifer	Netherlands	Sci-fi Family Film
Chaos Walking	Doug Liman	Tom Holland, Daisy Ridley	United States	Action Adventure Fantasy Western
Cosmic Sin	Edward John Drake	Bruce Willis, Frank Grillo	United States	Action
Cube (a.k.a. Cube: Ichido haittara, saigo)	Yasuhiko Shimizu	Masaki Suda, Masaki Okada	Japan	Horror Mystery Thriller
Demonic	Neill Blomkamp	Carly Pope, Chris William Martin, Michael J. Rogers, Nathalie Boltt, Terry Chen, Kandyse McClure	Canada; United States	Sci-fi Supernatural Horror
Don't Look Up	Adam McKay	Leonardo DiCaprio, Jennifer Lawrence, Meryl Streep, Cate Blanchett, Rob Morgan, Jonah Hill, Mark Rylance, Tyler Perry, Timothée Chalamet, Ron Perlman, Ariana Grande, Scott Mescudi	United States	Comedy Drama
Doors	Saman Kesh, Dugan O'Neal, Jeff Desom	Kathy Khanh, Julianne Collins, Aric Floyd	United States	
Dune (a.k.a. Dune: Part One)	Denis Villeneuve	Timothée Chalamet, Rebecca Ferguson, Stellan Skarsgård	United States	Epic space opera
Encounter	Michael Pearce	Riz Ahmed, Octavia Spencer	United Kingdom	Drama Thriller
Eternals	Chloe Zhao	Gemma Chan, Richard Madden, Kumail Nanjiani, Lia McHugh, Brian Tyree Henry, Lauren Ridloff, Barry Keoghan, Don Lee, Kit Harington, Salma Hayek, Angelina Jolie	United States	Superhero film
Evangelion: 3.0+1.0 Thrice Upon a Time (a.k.a. Shin Evangelion Gekijôban)	Hideaki Anno	Megumi Ogata, Megumi Hayashibara, Yûko Miyamura, Akira Ishida	Japan	Animation Action Drama
Finch	Miguel Sapochnik	Tom Hanks, Caleb Landry Jones	United States	Adventure Drama
The Forever Purge	Everardo Gout	Ana de la Reguera, Tenoch Huerta	United States	Action Crime Horror Thriller
Ghostbusters: Afterlife	Jason Reitman	Carrie Coon, Finn Wolfhard, Mckenna Grace, Bokeem Woodbine, Paul Rudd, Celeste O'Connor, Bill Murray, Dan Aykroyd, Ernie Hudson, Annie Potts, Sigourney Weaver	United States	Adventure Comedy Fantasy
Glasshouse	Kelsey Egan	Jessica Alexander, Anja Taljaard, Hilton Pelser, Adrienne Pearce, Kitty Harris, Brent Vermeulen	South Africa	Drama Thriller
Godzilla vs. Kong	Adam Wingard	Alexander Skarsgard, Rebecca Hall, Kyle Chandler, Millie Bobby Brown	United States	Action Thriller Kaijū
Infinite	Antoine Fuqua	Mark Wahlberg, Chiwetel Ejiofor, Sophie Cookson, Jason Mantzoukas, Toby Jones	United States	Action
Injustice	Matt Peters	Justin Hartley, Anson Mount, Laura Bailey, Janet Varney (all voice)	United States	Action Animation
Little Fish	Chad Hartigan	Olivia Cooke, Jack O'Connell, Raúl Castillo, Soko	United States	Drama Romance
The Matrix Resurrections	Lana Wachowski	Keanu Reeves, Carrie-Anne Moss, Yahya Abdul-Mateen II, Jessica Henwick	United States	Action
The Mitchells vs. the Machines	Mike Rianda	Danny McBride, Abbi Jacobson, Maya Rudolph, Mike Rianda, Eric André, Olivia Colman	Hong Kong; United States	Science Fiction Comedy
Mobile Suit Gundam: Hathaway	Shūkō Murase	Kenshô Ono (voice), Reina Ueda (voice), Jun'ichi Suwabe (voice), Sôma Saitô (voice)	Japan	
Mother/Android	Mattson Tomlin	Chloë Grace Moretz, Algee Smith, Raúl Castillo	United States	Drama Thriller
Needle in a Timestack	John Ridley	Leslie Odom Jr., Freida Pinto	United States	Drama Fantasy Romance
Night Raiders	Danis Goulet	Elle-Máijá Tailfeathers, Brooklyn Letexier-Hart, Alex Tarrant, Amanda Plummer, Violet Nelson	Canada; New Zealand	Action Thriller
Outside the Wire	Mikael Håfström	Anthony Mackie, Damson Idris, Emily Beecham	United States	Action Adventure Fantasy
Oxygen (a.k.a. Oxygène)	Alexandre Aja	Mélanie Laurent, Mathieu Amalric, Malik Zidi	France	Drama Fantasy Thriller
Quarantine (a.k.a. KARAntin)	Diana Ringo	Anatoliy Beliy, Aleksandr Obmanov	Finland, Russia	Dystopia Drama
Reminiscence	Lisa Joy	Hugh Jackman, Rebecca Ferguson	United States	Mystery Romance Thriller
Resident Evil: Welcome to Raccoon City	Johannes Roberts	Kaya Scodelario, Hannah John-Kamen, Robbie Amell, Tom Hopper	Canada Germany	Mystery Romance Thriller
Ron's Gone Wrong	Sarah Smith and Jean-Philippe Vine	Jack Dylan Grazer, Zach Galifianakis, Ed Helms, Justice Smith, Rob Delaney, Kylie Cantrall, Ricardo Hurtado, Olivia Colman	United Kingdom; United States	Animated satirical science fiction comedy
Seo Bok	Lee Yong-ju	Gong Yoo, Park Bo-gum	South Korea	Science Fiction Action
Settlers	Wyatt Rockefeller	Sofia Boutella, Ismael Cruz Córdova, Jonny Lee Miller	United Kingdom	Drama Thriller
Stowaway	Joe Penna	Anna Kendrick, Daniel Dae Kim, Shamier Anderson, Toni Collette	United States; Germany	Adventure Thriller
Space Sweepers (a.k.a. Seungriho)	Jo Sung-hee	Song Joong-ki, Kim Tae-ri, Jin Seon-kyu, Yoo Hae-jin	South Korea	Action Adventure Drama Fantasy
Spider-Man: No Way Home	Jon Watts	Tom Holland, Zendaya, Benedict Cumberbatch, Jon Favreau, Jamie Foxx, Willem Dafoe, Alfred Molina, Andrew Garfield, Tobey Maguire	United States	Superhero Action Adventure Fantasy
Strawberry Mansion	Albert Birney, Kentucker Audley	Penny Fuller, Kentucker Audley, Grace Glowicki, Reed Birney, Linas Phillips, Constance Shulman	United States	Adventure Fantasy Romance
The Suicide Squad	James Gunn	Margot Robbie, Idris Elba, John Cena, Joel Kinnaman, Sylvester Stallone, Viola Davis	United States	Action Adventure Comedy
Tides (a.k.a. The Colony)	Tim Fehlbaum	Nora Arnezeder, Sarah-Sofie Boussnina, Iain Glen	Switzerland; Germany	Action Adventure Thriller
The Tomorrow War	Chris McKay	Chris Pratt, Yvonne Strahovski, J. K. Simmons, Betty Gilpin, Sam Richardson, Edwin Hodge	United States	Action Adventure Drama Thriller
Venom: Let There Be Carnage	Andy Serkis	Tom Hardy, Michelle Williams, Naomie Harris, Woody Harrelson	United States	Action Thriller
Voyagers	Neil Burger	Colin Farrell, Tye Sheridan, Lily-Rose Depp	United States	Adventure Thriller
Warning	Agata Alexander	Alex Pettyfer, Alice Eve, Annabelle Wallis, Benedict Samuel, Charlotte Le Bon, Thomas Jane, Patrick Schwarzenegger, Rupert Everett, Tomasz Kot, Kylie Bunbury, Garance Marillier	United States; Poland	Drama Thriller
Zack Snyder's Justice League	Zack Snyder	Ben Affleck, Henry Cavill, Amy Adams, Gal Gadot, Ray Fisher, Jason Momoa, Ezra Miller, Willem Dafoe, Jesse Eisenberg, Jeremy Irons, Diane Lane, Connie Nielsen, J. K. Simmons	United States	Superhero Action Adventure Fantasy
Zone 414	Andrew Baird	Guy Pearce, Matilda Lutz, Travis Fimmel	United States	Thriller
2022
Title	Director	Cast	Country	Subgenre/Notes
The Abandon	Jason Satterlund	Jonathan Rosenthal, Tamara Perry, Regis Terencio, Dan Kyle	United States	Thriller Horror
The Adam Project	Shawn Levy	Ryan Reynolds, Jennifer Garner, Zoe Saldaña, Mark Ruffalo, Catherine Keener	United States	Action Adventure Comedy
Aavasavyuham	Krishand	Rahul Rajagopal, Nileen Sandra	India	mockumentary
After Yang	Kogonada	Colin Farrell	United States	Drama
Alienoid	Choi Dong-hoon	Ryu Jun-yeol, Kim Woo-bin, Kim Tae-ri	South Korea	Science Fiction Fantasy
The Artifice Girl	Franklin Ritch	Tatum Matthews, Sinda Nichols, David Girard, Lance Henriksen	United States	Mystery Thriller
Attack: Part 1	Lakshya Raj Anand	John Abraham, Rakul Preet Singh, Jacqueline Fernandez, Prakash Raj	India	Science Fiction Action
Avatar: The Way of Water	James Cameron	Sam Worthington, Zoe Saldaña, Sigourney Weaver, Kate Winslet, Stephen Lang	United States	Action Adventure Fantasy
Bigbug	Jean-Pierre Jeunet	Elsa Zylberstein	France	Comedy
Black Panther: Wakanda Forever	Ryan Coogler	Letitia Wright, Lupita Nyong'o, Tenoch Huerta	United States	Action Adventure Drama Fantasy Thriller
Captain	Shakti Soundar Rajan	Arya, Aishwarya Lekshmi	India	Science Fiction Monster
Crimes of the Future	David Cronenberg	Viggo Mortensen, Léa Seydoux, Kristen Stewart	United States; Canada	Drama Horror
Dual	Riley Stearns	Karen Gillan, Aaron Paul	United States	Comedy Drama Thriller
Everything Everywhere All at Once	Daniel Kwan, Daniel Scheinert	Michelle Yeoh, Stephanie Hsu, Ke Huy Quan, James Hong, Jamie Lee Curtis	United States	Action Adventure Comedy Fantasy
Jurassic World Dominion	Colin Trevorrow	Chris Pratt, Bryce Dallas Howard	United States	Action Adventure Thriller
Kids vs. Aliens	Jason Eisener	Dominic Mariche, Phoebe Rex, Calem MacDonald, Asher Grayson	United States	Science Fiction Horror
Legion of Super-Heroes	Jeff Wamester	Meg Donnelly, Darren Criss, Darin De Paul, Jensen Ackles	United States	Animation Action
Lightyear	Angus MacLane	Chris Evans	United States	Animation Action Adventure Drama Family
LOLA	Andrew Legge	Emma Appleton, Stefanie Martini	Ireland; United Kingdom	Found footage: alternate history World War II
Maika: The Girl From Another Galaxy	Ham Tran	Chu Diep Anh, Kim Nha, Ngoc Tuong, Truong Phu	Vietnam	Adventure Comedy Family
Mobile Suit Gundam: Cucuruz Doan's Island	Yoshikazu Yasuhiko		Japan	
Monolith	Matt Vesely	Lily Sullivan (on screen); Erik Thomson, Kate Box, Terence Crawford, Damon Herriman, Ling Cooper Tang (voices)	Australia	Sci-fi / horror thriller (indie film)
Moonfall	Roland Emmerich	Halle Berry, Patrick Wilson	United States	Action Adventure
Moon Man	Zhang Chiyu	Shen Teng, Ma Li	China	Science Fiction Comedy
Nope	Jordan Peele	Daniel Kaluuya, Keke Palmer, Steven Yeun	United States	Horror Mystery Thriller
Petrópolis	Valery Fokin	Anton Shagin, Yuliya Snigir	Russia	Science-fiction Drama
Prey	Dan Trachtenberg	Amber Midthunder, Dakota Beavers, Dane DiLiegro	United States	Action Adventure Drama Horror Thriller
Rubikon	Magdalena Lauritsch	Magdalena Lauritsch, Jessica Lind, Elisabeth Schmied	Austria	Drama
Shin Ultraman	Shinji Higuchi	Takumi Saitoh, Masami Nagasawa, Daiki Arioka, Akari Hayami, Tetsushi Tanaka, Hidetoshi Nishijima	Japan	Superhero Film
Sonic the Hedgehog 2	Jeff Fowler	Ben Schwartz, Jim Carrey, James Marsden, Tika Sumpter, Idris Elba	United States	Action Adventure Comedy Family Fantasy
Spiderhead	Joseph Kosinski	Chris Hemsworth, Miles Teller, Jurnee Smollett	United States	Action Crime Drama Thriller
Strange World	Don Hall	Jake Gyllenhaal, Dennis Quaid, Lucy Liu, Gabrielle Union	United States	Animation Action Adventure Comedy Family Fantasy
UFO Sweden	Victor Danell	Inez Dahl Torhaug, Jesper Barkselius, Eva Melander, Sara Shirpey	Sweden	Science Fiction Adventure
Vesper	Kristina Buožytė, Bruno Samper	Raffiella Chapman, Eddie Marsan, Rosy McEwen, Richard Brake	Lithuania; France; Belgium	Post-apocalyptic, dystopian, biopunk
W	Anna Eriksson	Anna Eriksson, Parco Lee, Jussi Parviainen	Finland	Dystopia
Warriors of Future	Ng Yuen-fai	Louis Koo, Sean Lau	Hong Kong	Action Adventure Thriller
2023
Title	Director	Cast	Country	Subgenre/Notes
1984	Diana Ringo	Aleksandr Obmanov, Diana Ringo	Finland; Russia	Dystopian Drama
65	Scott Beck, Bryan Woods	Adam Driver	United States	Thriller
AIMEE The Visitor	Charles Band	Dallas Schaefer, Faith West, Felix Merback, Tom Dacey Carr	United States	
Aliens Abducted My Parents and Now I Feel Kinda Left Out	Jake Van Wagoner	Emma Tremblay, Jacob Buster, Will Forte, Elizabeth Mitchell	United States	
Alien Invasion	Fred Searle	Sarah T. Cohen, Benjamin Colbourne, Nikolai Leon	United Kingdom	
Alien Planet	Alan Maxson	Alexandra Bokova, Hunter C. Smith, Naiia Lajoie, Eric Prochnau	United States	
Ant-Man and the Wasp: Quantumania	Peyton Reed	Paul Rudd, Evangeline Lilly, Michael Douglas, Michelle Pfeiffer	United States	Superhero Film
Ape Vs Mecha Ape	Marc Gottlieb	Tom Arnold, Anna Telfer, Lisa Ellee, Jack Pearson	United States	
Aquaman and the Lost Kingdom	James Wan	Jason Momoa, Patrick Wilson, Amber Heard, Yahya Abdul-Mateen II	United States	
Asteroid City	Wes Anderson	Bryan Cranston, Edward Norton, Jason Schwartzman, Jake Ryan	United States	Comedy Drama
Babylon 5: The Road Home	Matt Peters	Bruce Boxleitner, Claudia Christian, Peter Jurasik, Bill Mumy	United States	
Beneath the Green	Jason Georgiades	Eric Roberts, Anthony Nikolchev, Veronica Wylie, Garland Scott	United States	
Bird Box Barcelona	Álex Pastor, David Pastor	Mario Casas, Naila Schuberth, Georgina Campbell, Diego Calva	United States; Spain	
Blue Beetle	Ángel Manuel Soto	Xolo Maridueña, Adriana Barraza, Damián Alcázar, Raoul Max Trujillo	United States	
Colonials	Andrew Balek, Joe Bland	Greg Kriek, Daniel Roebuck, Sean Kanan, Jon Provost	United States	
Concrete Utopia	Um Tae-hwa	Lee Byung-hun, Park Seo-joon, Park Bo-young, Kim Sun-young	South Korea	
Control Zeta	Axel Gaibisso	María Abadi, Milagros Betti, Oscar Dubini, Sofía Elliot	Argentina	
Crater	Kyle Patrick Alvarez	Isaiah Russell-Bailey, Mckenna Grace, Billy Barratt, Scott Mescudi	United States	Adventure
The Creator	Gareth Edwards	John David Washington, Gemma Chan, Allison Janney	United States	Action
The Fantastic Golem Affairs	Burnin' Percebes	Brays Efe, Bruna Cusí, Luis Tosar, Anna Castillo, Javier Botet	Spain	Comedy
Fingernails	Andy Muschietti	Jessie Buckley, Riz Ahmed, Jeremy Allen White, Luke Wilson	United States	Romantic Drama
The Flash	Andy Muschietti	Ezra Miller, Ben Affleck, Michael Keaton, Sasha Calle	United States	Superhero Film
Future Soldier	Ed Kirk	Sean Earl McPherson, Yasmine Alice, Ellie Pickering, Ian Curd	United Kingdom	Action
Foe	Garth Davis	Saoirse Ronan, Paul Mescal, Aaron Pierre	United States	Psychological Thriller
Forgotten Experiment	Aleksandr Boguslavskiy	Viktor Dobronravov, Sonia Priss, Valeriya Shkirando, Egor Beroev	Russia	
Godzilla Minus One	Takashi Yamazaki	Ryunosuke Kamiki, Minami Hamabe, Yuki Yamada, Munetaka Aoki	Japan	Kaiju Monster Film
Gray Matter	Meko Winbush	Mia Isaac, Jessica Frances Dukes, Garret Dillahunt, Andrew Liner	United States	
Guardians of the Galaxy Vol. 3	James Gunn	Chris Pratt, Zoe Saldaña, Dave Bautista	United States	Superhero Film
The Hunger Games: The Ballad of Songbirds & Snakes	Francis Lawrence	Tom Blyth, Rachel Zegler, Hunter Schafer	United States	Dystopian Action
Indiana Jones and the Dial of Destiny	James Mangold	Harrison Ford, Phoebe Waller-Bridge, Mads Mikkelsen, John Rhys-Davies	United States	Action Adventure
Infinity Pool	Brandon Cronenberg	Alexander Skarsgård, Mia Goth	Canada; Croatia; France; Hungary	Horror
I.S.S	Gabriela Cowperthwaite	Ariana DeBose, Chris Messina, John Gallagher Jr., Masha Mashkova	United States	Thriller
Jung_E	Yeon Sang-ho	Kang Soo-yeon, Kim Hyun-joo, Ryu Kyung-soo	South Korea	Action
Justice League x RWBY: Super Heroes & Huntsmen	Kerry Shawcross, Dustin Matthews (Part 2), Yssa Badiola (Part 2)	Natalie Alyn Lind, Chandler Riggs, Nat Wolff, Jamie Chung (all voice)	United States	Animation Action Fantasy
Justice League: Warworld	Jeff Wamester	Jensen Ackles, Darren Criss, Stana Katic	United States	
The Kitchen	Kibwe Tavares, Daniel Kaluuya	Kane Robinson, Ian Wright	United Kingdom	Drama
The Last Boy On Earth	Nicolás Onetti	Camilo Levigne, Hugo Quiril, Raymond E. Lee, Paulo Vilela	New Zealand Argentina	Horror Adventure
Lego Marvel Avengers Code Red	Ken Cunningham	Laura Bailey (voice), Haley Joel Osment (voice), Will Friedle (voice), James C. Mathis III (voice)	United States	Action Family Animation
Landscape with Invisible Hand	Cory Finley	Asante Blackk, Kylie Rogers, Tiffany Haddish	United States	
M3GAN	Gerard Johnstone	Allison Williams	United States	Horror
Maid Droid	Rich Mallery	Faith West, Jose Adam Alvarez, Kylee Michael, Anthony Rainville	United States	
Mars Express	Jérémie Périn	Léa Drucker, Mathieu Amalric	France	Neo-noir
The Marvels	Nia DaCosta	Brie Larson, Teyonah Parris, Iman Vellani	United States	Superhero Film
Molli and Max in the Future	Michael Lukk Litwak	Zosia Mamet, Aristotle Athari	United States	
Monsters of California	Tom DeLonge	Jack Samson, Jack Lancaster, Jared Scott, Gabrielle Haugh	United States	Comedy Drama
No One Will Save You	Brian Duffield	Kaitlyn Dever	United States	Horror
Paradise	Boris Kunz	Kostja Ullmann, Corinna Kirchhoff, Marlene Tanczik, Iris Berben	Germany	Thriller
The Park	Shal Ngo	Chloe Guidry, Nhedrick Jabier, Carmina Garay, Billy Slaughter	United States	Drama Thriller Action Horror
The Pod Generation	Sophie Barthes	Emilia Clarke, Chiwetel Ejiofor, Rosalie Craig, Vinette Robinson	Belgium; France; United Kingdom	Romantic Comedy
Rebel Moon - Part One: A Child of Fire	Zack Snyder	Sofia Boutella, Charlie Hunnam, Ray Fisher	United States	Epic space opera
Restore Point	Robert Hloz	Andrea Mohylová, Matěj Hádek	Czech Republic; Slovakia; Poland; Serbia	Cyberpunk
Revenge of the Empire of the Apes	Mark Polonia	Tim Hatch, Herk Reynolds, Jamie Morgan	United States	Comedy Horror
Resurrected	Egor Baranov	Dave Davis, Karli Hall, Erika Chase, Kristen Ariza	Russia	
Robots	Ant Hines, Casper Christensen	Shailene Woodley, Jack Whitehall, Nick Rutherford, Emanuela Postacchini	United States	Romance Fantasy Comedy
Robotica Destructiva	Sam Gaffin	Amber Belko, Torie Martin, Kristal Theron, Sam Gaffin	United States	
Robot Dreams	Pablo Berger	Silent Film	Spain, France	Animated Tragicomedy
The Shift	Brock Heasley	Kristoffer Polaha, Neal McDonough, John Billingsley, Sean Astin	United States	Christian Thriller
Shin Kamen Rider	Hideaki Anno	Sousuke Ikematsu, Minami Hamabe, Tasuku Emoto	Japan	Superhero
Simulant	April Mullen	Robbie Amell, Jordana Brewster, Simu Liu, Sam Worthington	Canada	Thriller
Space Pups	Jason Murphy	Myron Donley, Riley Madison, Fuller Elijah Green, Krista Kelley	United States	Family Adventure
Spider-Man: Across the Spider-Verse	Joaquim Dos Santos, Kemp Powers, Justin K. Thompson	Shameik Moore, Hailee Steinfeld, Jake Johnson, Oscar Isaac	United States	Superhero
Spy Kids: Armageddon	Robert Rodriguez	Gina Rodriguez, Zachary Levi, D. J. Cotrona, Billy Magnussen	United States	Adventure Family Comedy
The Stratum	Crash Buist	Crash Buist, Lauren Senechal, Jonathan Medina, Ramin Karimloo	United States	
The Missing	Carl Joseph Papa	Carlo Aquino, Gio Gahol, Dolly de Leon	Philippines	Adult Animation
The Moon	Kim Yong-hwa	Sul Kyung-gu, Doh Kyung-soo, Kim Hee-ae	South Korea	Space Survival Drama
They Cloned Tyrone	Juel Taylor	John Boyega, Jamie Foxx, Teyonah Parris	United States	
T.I.M.	Spencer Brown	Georgina Campbell, Eamon Farren, Mark Rowley, Amara Karan	United Kingdom	Thriller Horror
Teenage Mutant Ninja Turtles: Mutant Mayhem	Jeff Rowe	Micah Abbey, Shamon Brown Jr., Nicolas Cantu, Brady Noon	United States	
Transformers: Rise of the Beasts	Steven Caple Jr.	Anthony Ramos, Dominique Fishback, Peter Cullen, Ron Perlman, Michelle Yeoh	United States	Action Adventure
The Wandering Earth 2	Frant Gwo	Wu Jing, Andy Lau, Li Xuejian	China	Action Adventure
2024
Title	Director	Cast	Country	Subgenre/Notes
Afraid	Chris Weitz	John Cho, Katherine Waterston, Havana Rose Liu, Lukita Maxwell	United States	Horror Thriller
Aftermath	József Gallai, Gergő Elekes	Fruzsina Nagy, Edward Apeagyei, Sally Kirkland, Eric Roberts, James Duval, Simon Bamford	Hungary; United States	United Kingdom
Agent Recon	Derek Ting	Derek Ting, Marc Singer, Chuck Norris, Sylvia Kwan	United States	Action
Alien Country	Boston McConnaughey	Rachele Brooke Smith, Alireza Mirmontazeri, Corbin Allred, K. C. Clyde	United States	Action Comedy Horror
Alien: Romulus	Fede Álvarez	Cailee Spaeny, Isabela Merced	United States	Horror
Alienoid: Return to the Future	Choi Dong-hoon	Ryu Jun-yeol, Kim Woo-bin, Kim Tae-ri	South Korea	
Gaganachari	Arun Chandu	Anarkali Marikar, Gokul Suresh	India	mockumentary
Another End	Piero Messina	Gael García Bernal, Renate Reinsve, Bérénice Bejo, Olivia Williams	Italy; France; United Kingdom	Romance Drama
Arcadian	Benjamin Brewer	Nicolas Cage, Jaeden Martell, Maxwell Jenkins, Sadie Soverall	United States Ireland Canada	Thriller Horror
Atlas	Brad Peyton	Jennifer Lopez, Simu Liu, Sterling K. Brown, Lana Parrilla, Mark Strong	United States	
Ayalaan	R. Ravikumar	Sivakarthikeyan, Rakul Preet Singh, Sharad Kelkar	India	Action Comedy
Badland Hunters	Heo Myeong-haeng	Ma Dong-seok, Lee Hee-joon, Lee Jun-young, Roh Jeong-eui	South Korea	
Big City Greens the Movie: Spacecation	Anna O'Brian	Chris Houghton, Marieve Herington, Bob Joles, Artemis Pebdani	United States	
Bionic	Afonso Poyart	Jessica Córes, Bibi Flor, Emilly Nayara, Gabz	Brazil	
Boomerang	Sauvik Kundu	Jeet, Rukmini Maitra, Sourav Das, Rajatava Dutta, Kharaj Mukherjee, Ambarish Bhattacharya, Shyamal Chakraborty, Jhulan Bhattacharya	India	Comedy Drama
Borderlands	Eli Roth	Cate Blanchett, Kevin Hart, Jamie Lee Curtis, Jack Black, Ariana Greenblatt	United States	Action
Code 8: Part II	Jeff Chan	Robbie Amell, Stephen Amell	Canada	Action Drama
The Day the Earth Blew Up: A Looney Tunes Movie	Peter Browngardt	Eric Bauza	United States	Animation Comedy
Deadpool & Wolverine	Shawn Levy	Ryan Reynolds, Hugh Jackman, Emma Corrin, Chris Evans, Morena Baccarin	United States	Action Comedy
Long Distance	Will Speck and Josh Gordon	Anthony Ramos, Naomi Scott, Kristofer Hivju, Zachary Quinto	United States	
Dune: Part Two	Denis Villeneuve	Timothée Chalamet, Zendaya, Rebecca Ferguson	United States	Epic space opera
Elevation	George Nolfi	Anthony Mackie, Morena Baccarin, Maddie Hasson, Danny Boyd Jr.	United States	Action Thriller
Else	Thibault Emin	Matthieu Sampeur, Édith Proust, Lika Minamoto	France, Belgium	horror, body horror
The Empire	Bruno Dumont	Lyna Khoudri, Anamaria Vartolomei, Camille Cottin, Fabrice Luchini	France	comedy
The Fix	Kelsey Egan	Clancy Brown, Daniel Sharman, Grace Van Dien, Greteli Fincham, Keenan Arrison, Nicole Fortuin	South Africa	thriller
Furiosa: A Mad Max Saga	George Miller	Anya Taylor-Joy, Chris Hemsworth	United States	
Ghostbusters: Frozen Empire	Gil Kenan	Carrie Coon, Finn Wolfhard, Mckenna Grace, Kumail Nanjiani, Patton Oswalt, Paul Rudd, Celeste O'Connor, Bill Murray, Dan Aykroyd, Ernie Hudson, Annie Potts	United States	Science Fiction Fantasy
Godzilla x Kong: The New Empire	Adam Wingard	Dan Stevens, Rebecca Hall, Brian Tyree Henry	United States	monster movie
Guest from the Future	Alexander Andryushchenko	Daria Vereshchagina, Mark Eidelstein	Russia	Teen Drama
The Invisibles	Andrew Currie	Tim Blake Nelson, Gretchen Mol, Bruce Greenwood, Simon Webster	Canada	Fantasy Drama
I.S.S.	Gabriela Cowperthwaite	Ariana DeBose, Chris Messina, John Gallagher Jr.	United States	Thriller
Jackpot	Paul Feig	Awkwafina, John Cena, Ayden Mayeri, Donald Elise Watkins	United States	Comedy Action
Justice League: Crisis on Infinite Earths: Part One	Jeff Wamester	Matt Bomer (voice), Jensen Ackles (voice), Darren Criss (voice), Meg Donnelly (voice)	United States	Action Animation
Justice League: Crisis on Infinite Earths: Part Two	Jeff Wamester	Matt Bomer (voice), Jensen Ackles (voice), Darren Criss (voice), Meg Donnelly (voice)	United States	Action Animation
Justice League: Crisis on Infinite Earths: Part Three	Jeff Wamester	Matt Bomer (voice), Jensen Ackles (voice), Darren Criss (voice), Meg Donnelly (voice)	United States	Action Animation
Kalki 2898 AD	Nag Ashwin	Prabhas, Amitabh Bachchan, Kamal Haasan, Deepika Padukone, Disha Patani	India	Epic Science Fiction
Kingdom of the Planet of the Apes	Wes Ball	Owen Teague, Kevin Durand, Freya Allan, Peter Macon, William H. Macy	United States	
Lego Marvel Avengers Mission Demolition	Ken Cunningham	Will Friedle, Kevin Smith, David Kaye, John Stamos, Tiffani Thiessen (all voice)	United States	Comedy Animation
Lesbian Space Princess	Emma Hough Hobbs, Leela Varghese	Shabana Azeez, Gemma Chua-Tran, Bernie Van Tiel, Richard Roxburgh, Aunty Donna, Kween Kong (all voice)	Australia	comedy animation
Levels	Adam Stern	Cara Gee, Peter Mooney, Aaron Abrams, David Hewlett	Canada	Thriller Action
Maid Droid Origins	Rich Mallery	Katie Kay, Fawn Winters, Cassie Ghersi, ryan Brewer	United States	Thriller Drama
Meanwhile on Earth	Jérémy Clapin	Megan Northam, Catherine Salée	France	Drama
Mobile Suit Gundam SEED Freedom	Mitsuo Fukuda	Sōichirō Hoshi, Rie Tanaka, Akira Ishida, Nanako Mori, Kenichi Suzumura	Japan	Mecha Anime
A Quiet Place: Day One	Michael Sarnoski	Lupita Nyong'o, Joseph Quinn, Alex Wolff	United States	
Rebel Moon - Part Two: The Scargiver	Zack Snyder	Sofia Boutella, Charlie Hunnam, Ray Fisher	United States	Epic space opera
Room 0	Richard Kodai	Natalya V. Wood, Karen Cherney, Victor Jones, Sean Collins	United States	Thriller Horror
Sentinel	Stefano Milla	Jason R. Moore, Ellie Patrikios, Neil Cole, Denitza Diakovska	United States	Action
Slingshot	Mikael Håfström	Casey Affleck, Laurence Fishburne	United States	Thriller
Sonic the Hedgehog 3	Jeff Fowler	Ben Schwartz, Jim Carrey, Keanu Reeves, Tika Sumpter, Idris Elba	United States	Action Adventure Comedy Family Fantasy
Space Command Redemption	Elaine Zicree, Marc Scott Zicree	Bita Arefnia, Don Baldaramos, David Bartlett, Joanna Bloem	United States	
Spaceman	Johan Renck	Adam Sandler, Carey Mulligan, Paul Dano	United States	Drama
Space Sharks	Dustin Ferguson	Eric Roberts, Brinke Stevens, Scott Schwartz, Vida Ghaffari	United States	Horror
Star Abyss	Zhang Xiaobei	Gao Zhiting, Andrew Lin, Ming Zi Yu, Maiqian Guo	China	Adventure Action
Subservience	S.K. Dale	Megan Fox, Michele Morrone, Madeline Zima, Matilda Firth	United States	Thriller Horror
The Substance	Coralie Fargeat	Demi Moore, Margaret Qualley, Dennis Quaid	France; United Kingdom; United States	Horror
Teri Baaton Mein Aisa Uljha Jiya	Amit Joshi, Aradhana Sah	Shahid Kapoor, Kriti Sanon	India	Romantic Comedy
Transformers One	Josh Cooley	Chris Hemsworth, Brian Tyree Henry, Scarlett Johansson, Keegan-Michael Key, Laurence Fishburne, Jon Hamm	United States	Animation Action
Ultraman: Rising	Shannon Tindle	Christopher Sean, Gedde Watanabe, Tamlyn Tomita, Keone Young (all voice)	United States; Japan	Family Animation Action
Venom: The Last Dance	Kelly Marcel	Tom Hardy, Chiwetel Ejiofor, Juno Temple, Rhys Ifans	United States	Action Adventure
V/H/S/Beyond	Jordan Downey; Christian Long; Justin Long; Justin Martinez; Virat Pal; Kate Siegel; Jay Cheel	Various	United States	Horror
Watchmen Chapter I	Brandon Vietti	Troy Baker, Adrienne Barbeau, Corey Burton, Michael Cerveris (all voice)	United States	Drama Animation
The Wild Robot	Chris Sanders	Lupita Nyong'o, Pedro Pascal, Kit Connor, Bill Nighy, Stephanie Hsu, Matt Berry, Ving Rhames, Mark Hamill, Catherine O'Hara	United States	Animation survival
Wonderland	Kim Tae-yong	Tang Wei, Bae Suzy, Park Bo-gum, Jung Yu-mi	South Korea	Drama
2025
Title	Director	Cast	Country	Subgenre/Notes
28 Years Later	Danny Boyle	Jodie Comer, Aaron Taylor-Johnson, Jack O'Connell, Alfie Williams, Ralph Fiennes	United Kingdom; United States	Thriller
Absolute Dominion	Lexi Alexander	Désiré Mia, Fabriano Viett, Andy Allo, Alex Winter, Patton Oswalt	United States	
Arco	Ugo Bienvenu	Margot Ringard Oldra, Oscar Tresanini	France	
Ash	Flying Lotus	Eiza González, Aaron Paul, Iko Uwais	United States	
The Astronaut	Jess Varley	Kate Mara, Laurence Fishburne	United States	
Avatar: Fire and Ash	James Cameron	Sam Worthington, Zoe Saldaña, Sigourney Weaver, Kate Winslet, Stephen Lang	United States	
Bugonia	Yorgos Lanthimos	Emma Stone, Jesse Plemons, Aidan Delbis, Stavros Halkias, Alicia Silverstone	United States	
C.O.G.	Tommy Savas	Piper Curda, Josh Zuckerman, Noel Fisher	United States	horror
Captain America: Brave New World	Julius Onah	Anthony Mackie, Danny Ramirez, Shira Haas, Carl Lumbly	United States	Thriller Action
Companion	Drew Hancock	Sophie Thatcher, Jack Quaid	United States	
Daniela Forever	Nacho Vigalondo	Henry Golding, Beatrice Grannò	Belgium; Spain	
The Electric State	Russo brothers	Millie Bobby Brown, Chris Pratt, Ke Huy Quan, Jason Alexander, Woody Harrelson, Stanley Tucci	United States	
Elio	Adrian Molina, Domee Shi, Madeline Sharafian	Yonas Kibreab, Zoe Saldaña	United States	Adventure
The Fantastic Four: First Steps	Matt Shakman	Pedro Pascal, Vanessa Kirby, Joseph Quinn, Ebon Moss-Bachrach	United States	
Frankenstein	Guillermo del Toro	Oscar Isaac, Jacob Elordi, Mia Goth, Christoph Waltz, Charles Dance	United States	
The Gorge	Scott Derrickson	Miles Teller, Anya Taylor-Joy, Sigourney Weaver	United States	
Jurassic World Rebirth	Gareth Edwards	Scarlett Johansson, Mahershala Ali, Jonathan Bailey, Rupert Friend	United States	
Lilo & Stitch	Dean Fleischer Camp	Sydney Agudong, Billy Magnussen, Chris Sanders, Zach Galifianakis, Maia Kealoha	United States	
The Long Walk	Francis Lawrence	Cooper Hoffman, David Jonsson, Garrett Wareing, Judy Greer, Mark Hamill	United States	
M3GAN 2.0	Gerard Johnstone	Allison Williams, Violet McGraw, Amie Donald	United States	
Mickey 17	Bong Joon-ho	Robert Pattinson, Naomi Ackie, Steven Yeun, Toni Collette, Mark Ruffalo	United States	
Osiris	William Kaufman	Max Martini, Brianna Hildebrand, LaMonica Garrett, Michael Irby, Linda Hamilton	United States	
Predator: Badlands	Dan Trachtenberg	Elle Fanning, Dimitrius Schuster-Koloamatangi	United States	
Predator: Killer of Killers	Dan Trachtenberg	Lindsay LaVanchy, Louis Ozawa Changchien, Rick Gonzalez, Michael Biehn	United States	Action horror
Primitive War	Luke Sparke	Ryan Kwanten, Tricia Helfer, Nick Wechsler, Jeremy Piven, Anthony Ingruber	Australia	Action horror
The Running Man	Edgar Wright	Glen Powell, William H. Macy, Lee Pace, Emilia Jones, Michael Cera, Josh Brolin	United Kingdom; United States	Action thriller
Site	Jason Eric Perlman	Jake McLaughlin, Theo Rossi, Miki Ishikawa, Arielle Kebbel	United States	Thriller
Star Trek: Section 31	Olatunde Osunsanmi	Michelle Yeoh	United States	Action Adventure
Superman	James Gunn	David Corenswet, Rachel Brosnahan, Nicholas Hoult, Edi Gathegi, Anthony Carrigan, Nathan Fillon, Isabela Merced	United States	Superhero film
Time Travel Is Dangerous	Chris Reading	Ruth Syratt, Megan Stevenson	United Kingdom	
Tron: Ares	Joachim Rønning	Jared Leto, Greta Lee, Evan Peters, Hasan Minhaj, Gillian Anderson, Jeff Bridges	United States	
War of the Worlds	Rich Lee	Ice Cube, Eva Longoria	United States	
World Breaker	Brad Anderson	Luke Evans, Milla Jovovich	United Kingdom; United States	
Xeno	Matthew Loren Oates	Lulu Wilson	United States	
2026
Title	Director	Cast	Country	Subgenre/Notes
28 Years Later: The Bone Temple	Nia DaCosta	Ralph Fiennes, Jack O'Connell, Alfie Williams, Erin Kellyman, Aaron Taylor-Johnson	United Kingdom; United States	
Armored Trooper VOTOMS: Die Graue Hexe	Mamoru Oshii		Japan	
The Bride!	Maggie Gyllenhaal	Penélope Cruz, Christian Bale, Jessie Buckley, Peter Sarsgaard, Annette Bening, Jake Gyllenhaal	United States	
Disclosure Day	Steven Spielberg	Emily Blunt, Josh O'Connor, Colin Firth, Eve Hewson, Colman Domingo, Wyatt Russell	United States	
The Dog Stars	Ridley Scott	Jacob Elordi, Margaret Qualley	United States; United Kingdom	
The End of Oak Street	David Robert Mitchell	Anne Hathaway, Ewan McGregor	United States	
Godzilla Minus Zero	Takashi Yamazaki	Ryunosuke Kamiki, Minami Hamabe	Japan	
Good Luck, Have Fun, Don't Die	Gore Verbinski	Sam Rockwell, Haley Lu Richardson, Michael Peña, Zazie Beetz, Juno Temple	United States	
Hope	Na Hong-jin	Hwang Jung-min, Zo In-sung, Jung Ho-yeon	South Korea	
Hoppers	Daniel Chong	Piper Curda, Bobby Moynihan, Jon Hamm	United States	
Hot Spot	Agnieszka Smoczyńska	Andrzej Konopka, Noomi Rapace, Reika Kirishima	Poland	
The Hunger Games: Sunrise on the Reaping	Francis Lawrence	Joseph Zada, Jesse Plemons, Ralph Fiennes, Glenn Close, Kieran Culkin, Elle Fanning, Mckenna Grace, Maya Hawke, Whitney Peak, Kelvin Harrison Jr.	United States	
I Love Boosters	Boots Riley	Demi Moore, Keke Palmer, Naomi Ackie, Taylour Paige, LaKeith Stanfield, Eiza González, Poppy Liu, Will Poulter	United States	
In the Blink of an Eye	Andrew Stanton	Kate McKinnon, Rashida Jones	United States	
Iron Lung	Mark Fischbach	Mark Fischbach, Caroline Rose Kaplan, Seán McLoughlin, David Szymanski, Elle LaMont	United States	
Klara and the Sun	Taika Waititi	Jenna Ortega, Amy Adams, Mia Tharia, Aran Murphy, Steve Buscemi, Natasha Lyonne	United Kingdom; United States	
The Last House	Louis Leterrier	Greta Lee, Wagner Moura	United States	
Masthishka Maranam	Krishand	Rajisha Vijayan, Jagadish, Niranj Maniyanpilla Raju	India	cyberpunk comedy
The Mandalorian and Grogu	Jon Favreau	Pedro Pascal, Jeremy Allen White, Brendan Wayne, Lateef Crowder, Jonny Coyne, Martin Scorsese, Sigourney Weaver	United States	
Mercy	Timur Bekmambetov	Chris Pratt, Rebecca Ferguson, Annabelle Wallis	United States	
Mike & Nick & Nick & Alice	BenDavid Grabinski	Vince Vaughn, James Marsden, Eiza González, Jimmy Tatro, Keith David, Emily Hampshire, Arturo Castro, Lewis Tan, Ben Schwartz	United States	
Mobile Suit Gundam Hathaway: The Sorcery of Nymph Circe	Shūkō Murase		Japan	
Poyla Baishakh	Arka Dasgupta	Shaantilal Mukherjee, Mumtaz Sorcar, Anindya Pulak Banerjee, Sneham, Suvosmita Mukherjee	India	
Project Hail Mary	Phil Lord and Christopher Miller	Ryan Gosling, Sandra Hüller	United States	
Soulm8te	Kate Dolan	Lily Sullivan, David Rysdahl, Claudia Doumit	United States	
Storm Rider: Legend of Hammerhead	Zoran Lisinac; Domagoj Mazuran	James Cosmo, Caroline Goodall, Billy Barratt, Joey Ansah, Frances Tomelty, Sarah-Sofie Boussnina, Marco Ilsø, Goran Bogdan, Sergej Trifunović	United States	
Supergirl	Craig Gillespie	Milly Alcock	United States	
The Super Mario Galaxy Movie	Aaron Horvath; Michael Jelenic	Chris Pratt, Anya Taylor-Joy, Charlie Day	Japan; United States	
War Machine	Patrick Hughes	Alan Ritchson, Dennis Quaid, Stephan James, Jai Courtney, Esai Morales	Australia; United States	

== Forthcoming ==
Years
2026 2027 2028

2026
Title	Director	Cast	Country	Release
Avengers: Doomsday	Russo brothers	Chris Hemsworth, Vanessa Kirby, Anthony Mackie, Sebastian Stan, Letitia Wright, Paul Rudd, Channing Tatum, Pedro Pascal, Robert Downey Jr.	United States	December 18, 2026
Dune: Part Three	Denis Villeneuve	Timothée Chalamet, Zendaya, Rebecca Ferguson, Jason Momoa, Florence Pugh	United States	December 18, 2026
Ray Gunn	Brad Bird	Sam Rockwell, Scarlett Johansson, Tom Waits, Matt Berry, Bobby Cannavale, Alan Tudyk, Kathryn Hunter	United States	December 18, 2026
2027
Title	Director	Cast	Country	Release
Armored Trooper VOTOMS: Die Graue Hexe Part 2	Mamoru Oshii		Japan	2027
Avengers: Secret Wars	Russo brothers	Robert Downey Jr.	United States	December 17, 2027
Godzilla x Kong: Supernova	Grant Sputore	Kaitlyn Dever, Dan Stevens, Jack O'Connell, Delroy Lindo, Matthew Modine	United States	March 26, 2027
Leviathan	Michihito Fujii	Shunsuke Michieda, Natsuki Deguchi	Japan	February 11, 2027
Man of Tomorrow	James Gunn	David Corenswet, Nicholas Hoult, Rachel Brosnahan, Edi Gathegi, Nathan Fillion, Isabela Merced, Skyler Gisondo, Frank Grillo, Lars Eidinger	United States	July 9, 2027
Not Alone	Eric Guillon, Claire Dodgson, Jonathan del Val	Timothée Chalamet, Selena Gomez, Brett Goldstein, Rob Brydon, Jamie Demetriou, Diane Morgan, Allison Janney, Lamorne Morris	United States	April 16, 2027
A Quiet Place Part III	John Krasinski	Emily Blunt, Cillian Murphy Millicent Simmonds, Noah Jupe, Jack O'Connell, Katy O'Brian, Jason Clarke	United States	July 9, 2027
Sonic the Hedgehog 4	Jeff Fowler	Ben Schwartz, Jim Carrey, Kristen Bell, Idris Elba, Keanu Reeves, Tika Sumpter, Ben Kingsley, Matt Berry	United States	March 19, 2027
Spaceballs: The New One	Josh Greenbaum	Mel Brooks, Rick Moranis, Bill Pullman, Lewis Pullman, Keke Palmer, Daphne Zuniga, George Wyner, Josh Gad, Anthony Carrigan	United States	April 23, 2027
Spider-Man: Beyond the Spider-Verse	Bob Persichetti, Justin K. Thompson	Shameik Moore, Hailee Steinfeld, Jason Schwartzman, Karan Soni, Jharrel Jerome, Daniel Kaluuya, Nicolas Cage	United States	June 18, 2027
Star Wars: Starfighter	Shawn Levy	Ryan Gosling, Flynn Gray, Matt Smith, Mia Goth, Aaron Pierre, Simon Bird, Jamael Westman, Daniel Ings, Amy Adams	United States	May 28, 2027
The Great Beyond	J. J. Abrams	Glen Powell, Jenna Ortega, Emma Mackey, Sophie Okonedo, Merritt Wever, Samuel L. Jackson	United States	October 1, 2027
Voltron	Rawson Marshall Thurber	Daniel Quinn-Toye, Rita Ora, John Harlan Kim, Alba Baptista, Samson Kayo, Sterling K. Brown, Henry Cavill	United States	2027
2028 or later or unknown
Title	Director	Cast	Country	Release
Alpha Gang	David Zellner, Nathan Zellner	Léa Seydoux, Dave Bautista, Kelvin Harrison Jr.	United States	
Avatar: The Tulkun Rider	James Cameron	Sam Worthington, Zoe Saldaña, Sigourney Weaver, Stephen Lang, Michelle Yeoh	United States	December 21, 2029
Avatar: The Quest for Eywa	James Cameron	Sam Worthington, Zoe Saldaña, Sigourney Weaver, Stephen Lang, Michelle Yeoh	United States	December 19, 2031
Gundam	Jim Mickle	Sydney Sweeney, Noah Centineo	United States	
R.U.R.	Alex Proyas	Sammy Allsop, Lindsay Farris, Anthony LaPaglia, Richard Roxburgh	Australia; United States	
Riddick: Furya	David Twohy	Vin Diesel	United States	
Rogue Trooper	Duncan Jones	Aneurin Barnard, Hayley Atwell, Jack Lowden	United Kingdom	
Seeking the King	Won Shin-yun	Koo Kyo-hwan, Yoo Jae-myung, Seohyun	South Korea	
Skyline: Warpath	Liam O'Donnell	Iko Uwais, Scott Adkins	United States	
Untitled Sonic the Hedgehog spinoff film			United States	December 22, 2028

== See also ==
- List of science fiction films of the 2010s
- List of science fiction films of the 2000s
- List of abandoned and unfinished films
