= The Heart Is a Muscle =

The Heart Is a Muscle may refer to:

- The Heart Is a Muscle (song), a 2017 song by Gang of Youths
- The Heart Is a Muscle (film), a 2025 South African crime thriller film
