= The Fix (2024 film) =

- Release poster
- Directed by: Kelsey Egan
- Written by: Kelsey Egan
- Produced by: Greig Buckle; Kelsey Egan; Allison Friedman; Jeremy Walton; David Lyons
- Starring: Grace Van Dien; Daniel Sharman; Keenan Arrison; Tafara Nyatsanza; Nicole Fortuin
- Cinematography: Shaun Harley Lee
- Edited by: Richard Starkey
- Music by: Patrick Cannell; Sean Fourie; Michael Medhurst
- Production companies: Crave Pictures; Enigma Pictures
- Distributed by: Gravitas Ventures
- Release dates: 23 June 2024 (Chattanooga); 22 November 2024 (United States)
- Countries: South Africa; United States
- Language: English

The Fix is a 2024 science fiction thriller film written and directed by Kelsey Egan.

== Plot ==
Sometime in the near future, Earth's atmosphere has become too toxic for humanity to survive prolonged exposure. A corporation named Aethera, based in South Africa, holds the monopoly for a drug called AIRemedy, which they claim protects its users from the toxins, thus allowing them effective total control over humanity's fate. What they do not tell the general public is that they cannot produce enough to cover global demand. Despite the surveillance Aethera has enforced on public life, an underground movement has formed, led by a mysterious individual called Lazarus.

Ella McPhee is a famous model in Aethera's employment who has grown fatalistic over the death of her mother and predecessor, Fia McPhee, by suicide a year ago. Tully, Ella's drug-dealing ex-boyfriend, steals a vial of a substance which he believes to be a new party drug from Spider, his supplier. Despite her reluctance, Ella visits a party Tully previously invited her to, and catches him and her dresser, Gina, together. Distraught, she finds the vial, which Tully has dropped, and impulsively swallows its contents. Right afterwards, Ella collapses and, after awakening, begins to develop mutagenetic changes, including enhanced strength, gliding ability, and the manifestation of abnormal skin growths and retractable chitinous spurs.

Tully is cornered by Spider, but is unable to provide the formula. Upon learning that Ella consumed it, she and Tully try to escape over the party site's roof, but Tully slips and falls to his death. While fleeing, Ella collapses and is picked up by Boxer, a friend of Tully's who has had a crush on Ella but was spurned by her. Believing that Ella killed him, Gina calls the police on her, and the resulting manhunt attracts the attention of Eric O'Connors, the son of Aethera's chairman and head of the corp's research division. O'Connors has had Spider's group under surveillance since a mole successfully modified and then stole a sample of a synthetic substitute for AIRemedy's main reagent which he had been working on. The reagent was originally extracted from the genes of a dragonfly species immune to atmospheric toxins, but in their research attempts Aethera wiped out the species, and the replacement reagent proved deadly to all test subjects - all but Ella - who were injected with it. Fearing retribution for his continued lack of success, O'Connors sends his security forces after Ella to extract the adapted reagent from her.

Running from Boxer after he tries to molest her, Ella goes to a clinic, but her mutations cause the staff to react with revulsion. After evading security, Ella goes to Gina for help, and is called by Solomon, an Aethera scientist and Spider's mole, over Tully's phone. She agrees to a meeting but is kidnapped by Spider and Solomon, with Gina in pursuit as Ella's backup. They bring Ella to their drug lab, but before they can explain themselves, the police, called by Gina, storm the house and arrest Ella and Solomon, while Spider escapes. O'Connors learns of this and takes Ella and Solomon to an Aethera research facility, where he subjects her to a battery of tests and tortures Solomon for information about his formula's success. After telling Ella about the cause of her mutation, he falsely promises her to help her reverse her condition.

However, as her mutation progresses, Ella gains enhanced auditory senses and overhears a discussion between O'Connors and his father in which they mention that she will likely not survive the extraction of the reagent from her genome. Rebelling against her planned exploitation, she breaks herself and Solomon out while O'Connors collects his young son Max for a visit. Solomon confesses that he intended to create a permanently effective antidote which he, Spider and Lazarus want to distribute to every human on Earth, while Aethera would be far more selective about whom they would want to save. Spider infiltrates the facility and calls in a bomb threat as a diversion, prompting O'Connors to flood the building with gas to force the fugitives out.

Ella, Solomon and Spider come upon Max and take him along, forcing O'Connors to break off pursuit long enough to let them escape the building. Spider acts as a decoy to allow Ella and Solomon to get away. Atop a reservoir, Solomon urges Ella to seek out Lazarus and gives her the final ingredient for the antitoxin, before Ella jumps off and glides to safety, and O'Connors recaptures Solomon. Ella meets Lazarus, who is secretly O'Connors' personal aide Angela, and offers her cooperation in providing the world with the choice of an adaptive mutation for mankind's survival.

== Cast ==
- Grace Van Dien as Ella McPhee
- Daniel Sharman as Eric O'Connors
- Keenan Arrison as Solomon
- Tafara Nyatsanza as Tully
- Nicole Fortuin as Angela / Lazarus
- Robyn Rossouw as Gina
- Tina Redman as "Spider"
- Clancy Brown as The Chairman
- Caleb Payne as Max
- Terri Lane as Russ
- Chris van Rensburg as Shiloh
- Natalie Robbie as Nurse Von Lilienfeld
- Greteli Fincham as Tamsin

== Production ==
The concept for the film was in development for several years before being put to screen; production was originally scheduled to take place in 2019, but was postponed to be re-financed while Egan worked on her other sci-fi slate (starting with Glasshouse) in the meantime. Principal photography began in September 2021.

The cast included Grace Van Dien, Daniel Sharman, Keenan Arrison, Tina Redman, Robyn Roussouw, Tafara Nyatsanza, Nicole Fortuin, Clancy Brown, and Caleb Payne.

== Release ==
Test screenings began in February 2022 at the University of Pennsylvania's faculty of Cinema and Media Studies. At the 2023 Cannes Film Festival, it was announced The Exchange had acquired worldwide distribution rights to The Fix. The film premiered at the 2024 Chattanooga Film Festival's Closing Night. The film was released on video on demand on November 22, 2024.
