= A Banquet =

2021 British horror film

- Promotional release poster
- Directed by: Ruth Paxton
- Written by: Justin Bull
- Produced by: Leonora Darby; Nik Bower; James Harris; Mark Lane; Laure Vaysse
- Starring: Sienna Guillory; Jessica Alexander; Ruby Stokes
- Music by: CJ Mirra
- Production companies: HanWay Films; Tea Shop Productions; Riverstone Pictures; REP Productions 8 Ltd
- Distributed by: Signature Entertainment
- Release dates: 10 September 2021 (TIFF); 11 March 2022 (United Kingdom)
- Running time: 97 minutes
- Country: United Kingdom
- Language: English
- Box office: $13,125

A Banquet is a 2021 British horror film directed by Ruth Paxton and written by Justin Bull. The film stars Sienna Guillory as widowed mother Holly, whose husband, the father of her daughters Betsey (Jessica Alexander) and Isabelle (Ruby Stokes), died by suicide. One night, Betsey has what she believes to be a supernatural experience, which results in her refusing to eat.

A Banquet premiered at the 2021 Toronto International Film Festival (TIFF). It was released in selected cinemas and on digital platforms on 18 February 2022.

== Plot ==
Holly is taking care of her very ill husband. He drinks poison to kill himself. Her daughter, Betsey, is preparing to apply to go to university, but is unsure of what to focus her studies on. A teacher asks her to make a list of what she thinks is most important to her. Later, she goes to a party and wanders off into the woods. After she returns, she refuses to eat and claims to have had visions of a dark future, but one in which also she is special and her mother is a star. Although she does not seem to lose weight, her mother, distraught, takes her to doctors and specialists and empties out her bank account trying to find someone who can help.

Holly's mother visits and tells her of the Japanese legend of the futakuchi-onna ("two-mouthed woman") and suggests that is what Betsey is: a monster who is feeding off Holly's family. She offers to take Holly's younger daughter, Izzy, if she wants to escape what is happening, which she does. Betsey tells her mother that something is coming, and no matter what happens she should love and support her through it. They pass a terrible night together, and in the morning Betsey tells her mother that her love made everything possible. She dies. Holly, distraught, wanders out into the street. Stricken by grief, she collapses, but then appears to glow with a strange light.

== Cast ==
- Sienna Guillory as Holly Hughes
- Jessica Alexander as Betsey Hughes
- Ruby Stokes as Isabelle Hughes
- Kaine Zajaz as Dominic
- Lindsay Duncan as June
- Walter van Dyk as dentist

== Production ==
Filming was completed on 3 September 2020.

== Release ==
At the beginning of December 2020 IFC Midnight acquired the North America distribution rights to the film.

A Banquet had its premiere at the 2021 TIFF. It was released in selected cinemas and on digital platforms on 18 February 2022. Signature Entertainment released the film in the United Kingdom on 11 March. It was released on Blu-ray in 2021 by UK distributor Second Sight Films as a special edition including essays by Alexandra Heller-Nicholas, Heather Wixson, and Jennie Kermode.

== Reception ==
On the review aggregator website Rotten Tomatoes, the film has an approval rating of 55% based on 62 reviews, with an average rating of 6/10. The website's consensus reads, "If it isn't without its share of empty calories, A Banquet remains a lavishly appointed treat for fans of slow-burning horror." Metacritic, which uses a weighted average, assigned the film a score of 58 out of 100, based on 15 critics, indicating "mixed or average" reviews.

Lena Wilson of The New York Times wrote that "The film's slow-burn magic lies in the many questions it raises as it skitters to a fitful, explosive end", concluding: "You're likely to leave this movie starving for answers, but that hunger can be just as stimulating as it is burdensome." The Los Angeles Times' Noel Murray gave the film a mostly positive review, writing: "Muted and ambiguous — sometimes to a fault — A Banquet is well acted and well crafted and should resonate with viewers who have had experiences similar to those of the movie's perpetually anxious mother."

Christy Lemire, writing for RogerEbert.com, gave the film a score of two-and-a-half out of four stars, lamenting that, "because the sound design is so vivid and Paxton's eye for disturbing detail is so creative, it's even more frustrating that the payoff is so unsatisfying." Brian Tallerico, also of RogerEbert.com, referred to A Banquet as "a strong concept in search of a movie", stating that it is "constantly threatening to shape itself into something focused and powerful, but is too content to leave many of its best ideas unexplored." IndieWire's Kate Erbland gave the film a grade of "C+", concluding that "A Banquet is at its best when it burrows inside the confines of its nearly all-female cast — here, it seems, is a truly new take on what it means to live inside a woman's skin — but continued attempts to contextualize the saga in other ways fall flat."

John DeFore of the Hollywood Reporter commended Paxton's direction and the performances of Alexander and Guillory, but wrote that "Bull's screenplay comes up short, failing to adequately capture the depth of its teen's encounter with the abyss [...] and to integrate it into the more comprehensible domestic tensions that serve as the plotless film's only framework." Courtney Howard of Variety called the film "moderately creepy but emotionally insubstantial", writing that, "With nary any tangible scares, or much to truly unnerve or unsettle except from an empathetic humanistic standpoint, this feature-length directorial debut is assured, but far too ambiguous for its own good."
