= The Village (2019 TV series) =

2019 American drama television series

- Genre: Drama
- Created by: Mike Daniels
- Starring: Moran Atias; Dominic Chianese; Warren Christie; Frankie Faison; Jerod Haynes; Daren Kagasoff; Michaela McManus; Lorraine Toussaint; Grace Van Dien
- Composer: WAZ-JACKSON
- Country of origin: United States
- Original language: English
- No. of seasons: 1
- No. of episodes: 10

Production
- Executive producers: Mike Daniels; Minkie Spiro; Jessica Rhoades
- Producer: David Declerque
- Cinematography: William Rexer
- Editors: Bjørn T. Myrholt; Noah Pontell; Justin Chinn; Joe Mitacek
- Running time: 43 minutes
- Production companies: 6107 Productions; Universal Television

Original release
- Network: NBC
- Release: March 19 – May 21, 2019

The Village is an American drama television series created by Mike Daniels that premiered on NBC on March 19 and ended on May 21, 2019. The series stars an ensemble cast including Moran Atias, Michaela McManus, Frankie Faison, Jerod Haynes, Grace Van Dien, Warren Christie, Daren Kagasoff, Lorraine Toussaint, and Dominic Chianese.

In May 2019, the series was canceled after one season.

== Premise ==
The Village follows residents of an apartment building in Greenwich Village where "the people who reside in the building have built a bonded family of friends and neighbors". Main characters are: Sarah, a nurse, who is living with her teenage daughter Katie; Gabe, a law student, who helps his grandfather Enzo; Ava, an Iranian immigrant, who has a U.S.-born son and problems with ICE; Nick, a veteran, who is haunted by the past and also is the father of Katie (unbeknownst to her); Ron, the super, and Patricia, a social worker, who are "the heart and soul of the building" The stories are described as "hopeful, heartwarming and challenging ... that prove family is everything—even if it's the one you make with the people around you."

== Cast and characters ==
=== Main ===
- Moran Atias as Ava Behzadi, an Iranian refugee and Ben's love interest
- Dominic Chianese as Enzo Napolitano, Gabe's grandfather
- Warren Christie as Nick Porter, a former Army Ranger who lost his right leg in Afghanistan; he is also Katie's father. He owns a decommissioned military dog named Jedi that also lost a leg.
- Frankie Faison as Ron Davis, the super of The Village apartment building and the owner of the bar called Smalls
- Jerod Haynes as Ben Jones, a police officer and Ava's love interest
- Daren Kagasoff as Gabe Napolitano, Enzo's grandson and a law student
- Michaela McManus as Sarah Campbell, a nurse who works at a nursing home. She is Katie's mother.
- Lorraine Toussaint as Patricia Davis, Ron's wife and a social worker
- Grace Van Dien as Katie Campbell, Sarah and Nick's teenage daughter. In the premiere, it is revealed that she is pregnant, and that she does not know that Nick is her father.

=== Recurring ===
- Ben Ahlers as Liam, a street artist and Katie's love interest
- Guy Lockard as Gordon, Ron's estranged son
- Hailey Kilgore as Olivia, Gordon's daughter and Ron's granddaughter whom he's not been allowed to see
- Katrina Lenk as Claire, prospective adoptive mother of Katie's baby
- Deborah Ayorinde as Dana
- Paul Ben-Victor as Angelo Napolitano
- Nadine Nicole as Amy Bowman
- Kurt Yaeger as Joe
- Aimee Carrero as Sofia Lopez
- Mary Beth Peil as Gwendolina Ferrari

== Episodes ==
No.	Title	Directed by	Written by	Original release date	U.S. viewers (millions)
1	"Pilot"	Minkie Spiro	Mike Daniels	March 19, 2019	4.82
The Village is a New York apartment complex home to several residents. Sarah is a nurse with a teenage daughter Katie who reveals to her mother that she is pregnant. Ava is an Iranian immigrant who is arrested by ICE for being illegal causing her cop friend Ben to look after her young son. A law student Gabe takes on her case. Enzo, Gabe’s grandfather has also moved in with him, who spends the day at an amusement park where he and his recently deceased friend used to hang out. Ron Davis is the super of the building who is married to a social worker Patricia. Finally, there’s the newest tenant Nick Porter an amputee Afghanistan veteran with a pet dog Jedi. It is revealed that Nick is actually Katie’s father which Katie does not know. The residents have a late night party on the roof.
2	"Good Thing"	Peter Sollett	Mike Daniels	March 26, 2019	4.05
Sarah learns that Katie has lied to her and that Katie is 7 weeks farther along than she thought. Gabe is able to get Ava acquitted with a fee and a testimony from Ben who is struggling to take care of her son. He also wants Enzo to stay with him, but his domeering girlfriend tries to dissuade him from doing it. Patricia tells Ron about the cancer and he comforts her. Nick and Katie talk in Ron’s bar and she reveals that she’s pregnant which shocks Nick. Sarah finds them and tells Nick not to talk to her about it and questions if he is an addict and has PTSD and they decide not to tell Katie that he is her father. Gabe invites Enzo to move back in with him which he accepts. Katie and Sarah reconcile and both happily dance around their apartment.
3	"In Your Bones"	Peter Sollett	Erika L. Johnson	April 2, 2019	4.15
Katie tells Jagger, the father of her baby, about the baby causing him shock. Sarah tells the boy’s parents distressing Katie and the parents try to fix the situation which angers Katie. Sarah and Katie later reconcile though. Gabe’s father tries to dissuade him from taking in Enzo, but he refuses. Patricia begins getting frustrated by Ron trying to help her through the cancer news. Ava returns home to her son and later kisses Ben. Sarah’s new boyfriend John breaks up with her believing her history with Nick is too complicated. Nick goes to see Amy, the widow of one of his former soldiers, and reveals that his mistake is what got him killed. Amy and Nick end up kissing.
4	"Heart on Fire"	Steven DePaul	Abdi Nazemian	April 9, 2019	4.12
5	"Laid Bare"	Steven DePaul	Regina Corrado	April 16, 2019	3.81
6	"Yes or No"	Steven Tsuchida	Wolfe Coleman	April 23, 2019	4.11
7	"Couldn't Not Love You"	Steven Tsuchida	Elizabeth Laime	April 30, 2019	4.29
8	"Choosing to Hope"	Minkie Spiro	Natalie Smyka	May 7, 2019	3.85
9	"I Am Defiant"	Marta Cunningham	Terrence Coli	May 14, 2019	3.81
10	"I Have Got You"	Cheryl Dunye	Mike Daniels & Wolfe Coleman	May 21, 2019	4.22

== Production ==
=== Development ===
On January 22, 2018, it was announced that NBC had given the production a pilot order. The pilot was written by Mike Daniels who was also set as an executive producer. Production companies involved with the pilot were set to include Universal Television.

On May 7, 2018, it was announced that NBC had given the production a series order. It was also confirmed that Minkie Spiro would direct and executive produce the pilot. Jessica Rhoades is also set to serve as an executive producer and 6107 Productions will serve as an additional production company. A few days later, it was announced that the series would premiere as a mid-season replacement in the spring of 2019. On December 18, 2018, it was announced that the series would premiere on March 12, 2019, and air weekly on Tuesdays during the 10 p.m. time slot. On February 6, 2019, it was reported that the series premiere had been rescheduled for March 19, 2019 and that the season finale would air on May 21, 2019.

On May 30, 2019, NBC canceled the series after a single season.

=== Casting ===
In February 2018, it was announced that Moran Atias, Michaela McManus, Frankie Faison, Jerod Haynes, Grace Van Dien, Warren Christie, Daren Kagasoff, Lorraine Toussaint, and Dominic Chianese had been cast in lead roles in the pilot. On October 11, 2018, it was reported that Amy Carlson had been cast in a guest starring role. In December 2018, it was announced that Hailey Kilgore, Guy Lockard, Katrina Lenk, and Deborah Ayorinde had joined the cast in a recurring capacity.

== Reception ==
=== Critical response ===
On review aggregator Rotten Tomatoes, the series holds an approval rating of 23% based on 13 reviews, with an average rating of 4.90/10. The website's critical consensus reads, "The Village commendably attempts to affirm the bonds between neighbors in an urban community, but the series' overeagerness to wring tears from viewers will most likely only prompt them to roll their eyes." On Metacritic, it has a weighted average score of 47 out of 100, based on 8 critics, indicating "mixed or average reviews".

=== Ratings ===
Viewership and ratings per episode of The Village
No.	Title	Air date	Rating/share (18–49)	Viewers (millions)	DVR (18–49)	DVR viewers (millions)	Total (18–49)	Total viewers (millions)
1	"Pilot"	March 19, 2019	0.8/4	4.82	0.5	2.62	1.3	7.44
2	"Good Thing"	March 26, 2019	0.7/4	4.05	0.4	2.48	1.1	6.53
3	"In Your Bones"	April 2, 2019	0.7/3	4.15	0.4	2.19	1.1	6.31
4	"Heart on Fire"	April 9, 2019	0.7/3	4.12	0.3	1.90	1.0	6.01
5	"Laid Bare"	April 16, 2019	0.6/3	3.81	0.4	1.97	1.0	5.78
6	"Yes or No"	April 23, 2019	0.6/3	4.11	0.3	1.62	0.9	5.74
7	"Couldn't Not Love You"	April 30, 2019	0.7/3	4.29	—N/a	1.59	—N/a	5.77
8	"Choosing to Hope"	May 7, 2019	0.6/3	3.85	0.4	1.68	1.0	5.53
9	"I Am Defiant"	May 14, 2019	0.6/3	3.81	0.3	1.71	0.9	5.52
10	"I Have Got You"	May 21, 2019	0.6/3	4.22	0.3	1.59	0.9	5.70
