= Greteli Fincham =

South African actress (born 2001)

- Born: Greteli Sarah Fincham; 9 May 2001 (age 25)
- Other name: Greteli de Swardt
- Years active: 2019–present
- Spouse: Juan de Swardt (m. 2022)
- Children: 2
- Website: gretelifincham.mypixieset.com

Greteli Sarah de Swardt (née Fincham; born 9 May 2001) is a South African actress, photographer, and artist. She is known for her roles in the kykNET series Alles Malan (2019–) and the Netflix series Blood & Water (2020–).

== Early life ==
Fincham was born to parents Newton and Lisl. She has a sister. She attended Stellenbosch High School. She participated in school theatre productions and received a number of student and high school drama accolades.

== Career ==
Fincham made her television debut as a young version of Tinarie van Wyk-Loots' character Annabel Loots in the 2019 Showmax series Dwaalster. That same year, she began starring as Elani Malan in the kykNET series Alles Malan. The following year, she began playing Reece van Rensburg in the Netflix English-language teen crime drama series Blood & Water. A supporting role in the first season, she was promoted to a more central role for Blood & Water's second season. She also played a young version of Cintaine Schutte's character Sophia in the kykNET comedy-drama Ekstra Medium.

She has upcoming roles in the films The Fix directed by Kelsey Egan and Moeksie & Patrysie.

== Personal life ==
In February 2022, she married videographer Juan de Swardt, having been engaged since November 2021. The couple have a daughter and a son (born March 2023 and January 2025).

== Filmography ==
Year	Title	Role	Notes
2019	Dwaalster	Young Annabel	4 episodes
2019	Lui maar op, Belinda	Jessica	Episode: "Maggie en die Bouer"
2019–present	Alles Malan	Elani Malan	Main role
2020–2025	Blood & Water	Reece van Rensburg	Main role
2020	Ekstra Medium	Young Sophia	9 episodes
2024	The Fix	Tamsin	
TBA	Moeksie & Patrysie		
