= Kill Mode =

Dutch science fiction movie

- Directed by: Thijs Meuwese
- Written by: Thijs Meuwese
- Starring: Julia Batelaan; Dave Mantel; Yasmin Blake; Cyriel Guds; Ted Neeley
- Cinematography: Jasper Verkaart
- Release date: September 6, 2020 (Imagine Film Festival)
- Country: Netherlands
- Language: English
- Budget: $400,000

Kill Mode is a 2020 Dutch science fiction action film directed by Thijs Meuwese and starring Julia Batelaan, Dave Mantel and Ted Neeley. The film is a prequel to Meuwese's 2017 film Molly.

== Cast ==
- Julia Batelaan as Molly
- Dave Mantel as David Oscar
- Yasmin Blake as Alex
- Cyriel Guds as Angel
- Ted Neeley as The Old Man

== Release ==
The film premiered at the Imagine Film Festival on September 6, 2020 after the festival was delayed due to the Coronavirus pandemic.

== Reception ==
=== Critical reception ===
Jim Morazzini of Voices From The Balcony gave the film a positive review and wrote, "Despite its modest resources, Kill Mode delivers plenty of intense action, starting with an explosive shootout that sets the tone for the rest of the film."

Ard Vijn of ScreenAnarchy had both positive and negative comments and wrote, "With Molly, you couldn't help but wonder "how the hell did they do that when there clearly was no budget?", while with Kill Mode, Thijs Meuwese successfully manages to convince you you're watching a regular action film. In all probability his stretching-a-penny-into-a-dollar skills would make Larry Cohen and Roger Corman applaud, but here unfortunately it also makes you stop wondering "how did they do this?" and because of that, the film loses a lot of the charm which Molly had in spades."

=== Accolades ===
Kill Mode won Best Film Pitch at the Imagine Film Festival in 2015 and was nominated for the Méliès d'Argent for best film in 2020.
