= Jessica Alexander =

British actress (born 1999)

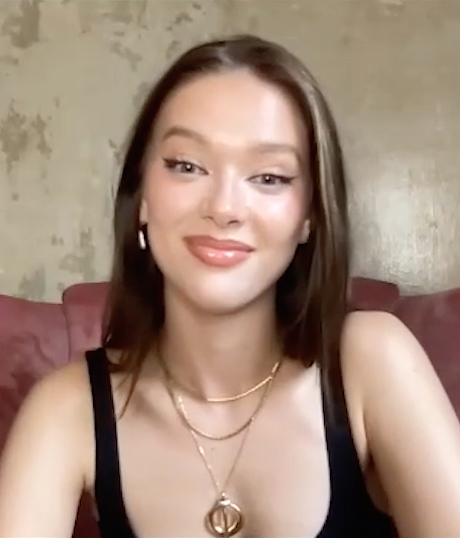
- Alexander in 2022
- Born: 19 June 1999 (age 27); Westminster, London, England
- Occupation: Actress
- Years active: 2013–present

Jessica Alexander (born 19 June 1999) is an English actress. She began her career in short films and garnered recognition for her role in the BBC iPlayer series Get Even (2020), and made her feature film debut in Glasshouse and A Banquet (both 2021). She gained further prominence in the Disney live-action film The Little Mermaid (2023) as Vanessa. Her films since include Primate (2025). On television, she more recently starred in the Globoplay series Fallen (2024) and the Sky Atlantic series Amadeus (2025).

== Early life ==
Alexander was born on 19 June 1999 in Westminster, central London and grew up in Richmond, South West London. Alexander attended Putney High School. She began acting at a church hall near home at age five and subsequently decided to pursue an acting career.

== Career ==
Alexander began auditioning for films at 14 years old. She made her debut in the Yorgos Lanthimos–directed short film Necktie (2013). In 2016, she appeared in another short film, titled Truck. She made her television debut in the 2018 Italian Disney Channel teen dramedy Penny on M.A.R.S. as Lucy Carpenter. That same year, she was scouted by Select Model Management. She later signed with Next, where she was a model in product and clothing advertisements. Alexander starred in the BBC iPlayer teen thriller series Get Even (2020), which had an international release on Netflix. Alexander played Olivia Hayes, a popular teenager who pretends to be wealthy and straight. She drew parallels between the character and herself at age 16, in that they were both incredibly determined despite not fully understanding themselves yet.

In 2021, Alexander starred as Bee in the South African dystopian thriller Glasshouse, directed by Kelsey Egan, whom Alexander had met through a previous project. Egan initially wanted a South African actress to play the role but found none who suited the character. In October 2020, she sent the script to Alexander, who enjoyed it and auditioned a few months later. The film was generally well received, with particular praise for its cast. Alexander's second release of the year, the British horror film A Banquet, received more lukewarm reviews from critics. Alexander's performance was lauded, however; The Times's Kevin Maher dubbed her a "rising star", while The New York Times's Lena Wilson favourably commented that her performance was "wrenching". In July 2022, she appeared in the Kate Cox–directed thriller film Into the Deep. Screen Rant writer Rachel Labonte opined that despite the acting being "hindered by their characters being under-written, ... Alexander does the best job at considering what was left unsaid about Lexie".

Alexander portrayed Vanessa, the human alter-ego of Ursula, played by Melissa McCarthy, in the musical fantasy film The Little Mermaid (2023), a live-action adaptation of Disney's 1989 animated film. Of her casting, director Rob Marshall stated it was a conscious decision to cast a relatively unknown actress as Vanessa since McCarthy was already portraying Ursula. He also said: "She's just a beautiful, beautiful actress, and she went there. It's sort of rare for someone that beautiful and charismatic to be able to then turn into the sea witch literally in front of you and just lose it. It was exciting to see that change." Alexander enjoyed playing the role, commenting that she "love[s] being demonic, and just going crazy on screen, so this was a perfect opportunity for that". The Little Mermaid, and its performances, received generally positive reviews from critics. Jordan Iacobucci of Comic Book Resources wrote that "Alexander's Vanessa is callous and conniving ... [she] takes the opportunity to go all-out, unleashing her villainous side in her final scene". Her performance was also praised by fans and went viral on the video-sharing app TikTok.

Alexander has a role in the Globoplay series Fallen, which is based on the eponymous novel series by Lauren Kate. The show follows Luce (Alexander), a young woman who is sent to a cult-like rehabilitation centre for a crime she has no memory of committing. She also appeared as Katerina in Amadeus, a drama miniseries revolving around the composer Wolfgang Amadeus Mozart.

Alexander starred in the natural horror film Primate (2025) as Hannah, one of a group of young friends who spend their vacation at a friend's house in Hawaii where they face Ben, the family's adopted chimpanzee, who becomes aggressive after contracting rabies. The movie received generally positive reviews from critics and Alexander's performance was praised: Jeff Ewing of Collider wrote that she "stands out the most [of the cast]" and Amy Nicholson from Los Angeles Times found her "magnetic" and "a screen presence with that extra twinkle". In February 2026, she appears in FX's "The Beauty" as the character Jordan, opposite Evan Peters.

== Personal life ==
Alexander is openly bisexual.

== Public image ==
Alexander is an advocate for the LGBTQ community and has been referred to as a gay icon. She uses her Instagram to spread awareness about LGBTQ-related issues. In March 2023, Alexander was included in the "Bright Young Things Class of 2023", a list by Tatler that names "the next generation of glam, gifted actors to watch".

== Filmography ==
=== Film ===
Television and film roles
Year	Title	Role	Notes	Ref.
2013	Necktie	Girl with Hanky	Short film	
2016	Truck	Siena	Short film	
2020	Birthday	Cora	Short film	
2021	Glasshouse	Bee	Direct-to-video film	
2021	A Banquet	Betsey	Direct-to-video film	
2022	Into the Deep	Lexie	Streaming film	
2023	The Little Mermaid	Vanessa (Ursula)		
2025	Primate	Hannah		
TBA	The Return of Stanley Atwell	TBA	Post-production	

=== Television ===
Year	Title	Role	Notes	Ref.
2018–2020	Penny on M.A.R.S.	Lucy Carpenter	Main role (series 1–2); 25 episodes	
2020	Get Even	Olivia Hayes	Main role; 10 episodes	
2024	Fallen	Lucinda "Luce" Preis	Main role; 8 episodes	
2025	Amadeus	Katerina	Main role; 5 episodes	
2026	The Beauty	Jordan Bennett (post Beauty)	Recurring role	

=== Music videos ===
Television and film roles
Year	Title	Role	Artist	Notes	Ref.
2024	"Too Much"	Girlfriend	Girl in Red		
