= Aliens Abducted My Parents and Now I Feel Kinda Left Out =

2023 American film

- Directed by: Jake Van Wagoner
- Written by: Austin Osanai Everett
- Produced by: Jake Van Wagoner; Micah W. Merrill; Maclain Nelson; Austin Osanai Everett; Jeremy Prusso
- Starring: Emma Tremblay; Jacob Buster; Will Forte; Elizabeth Mitchell; Matt Biedel
- Music by: Michael Lee Bishop
- Production companies: Good Guys Productions; Little Wagon Films; Kaleidoscope Pictures
- Release date: 18 August 2023 (United States)
- Country: United States
- Language: English

Aliens Abducted My Parents and Now I Feel Kinda Left Out is a 2023 American comedy adventure science fiction film directed by Jake Van Wagoner. It premiered at the 2023 Sundance Film Festival.

== Reception ==
On Rotten Tomatoes, the film has a score of 82% based on 17 reviews. Andrew Webster of The Verge called it "a lighthearted mashup of a family-friendly caper and coming-of-age tale, one that does just enough weird sci-fi stuff to help it get away with an otherwise formulaic story".
