= Molly (2017 film) =

Post-apocalyptic action film

- Directed by: Thijs Meuwese & Colinda Bongers
- Written by: Thijs Meuwese
- Starring: Julia Batelaan
- Release date: April 16, 2017 (Imagine Film Festival)
- Country: Netherlands
- Language: English

Molly is a 2017 Dutch science-fiction action film directed by Thijs Meuwese and Colinda Bongers and starring Julia Batelaan as the titular character Molly, a girl with supernatural abilities who travels alone in a post-apocalyptic wasteland. She soon finds herself hunted down by marauders who want her to compete in their fighting pit for their entertainment.

== Cast ==
- Julia Batelaan as Molly
- Joost Bolt as Deacon
- Annelies Appelhof as Kimmy
- Emma de Paauw as Bailey
- André Dongelmans as Fifth Wheel
- Arnost Kraus as Earl
- Tamara Brinkman as Margaret
- Cyriel Guds as Simon
- Shilton Chelius as The Truth

== Release ==
The film premiered at the Imagine Film Festival on April 16, 2017 and was nominated for the Black Tulip award.

== Reception ==
Molly received 83% on Rotten Tomatoes with critics specifically noting its visual style with its highly saturated colors and the final 30 minute set piece that consists of one uninterrupted long take. While never escaping its indie origins to find cult success, it ended up on several best of the year lists, with Ed Travis putting it at number 6 for Cinapse’s top 15 action movies of 2018.

Ard Vijn of Screen Anarchy compared it to Tony Jaa’s Tom-Yum-Goong and wrote “When the film finally enters its "attack the fortress" phase, there is a shot so ambitious, so accomplished in its execution, that you can't help but wonder: how the hell did they do this?!”

Many critics also brought up its shoestring budget as either a positive or a negative, with Daniel XIII of HorrorFuel writing “Molly seems like it wants to go further with the crazy, but keeps it held back for the first two acts.” though he felt the final set piece made up for it. A.W. Kautzer of The Movie Isle however, compared it to El Mariachi, saying: “Molly is the real deal. […] Something that will continually surprise you in the way that it brazenly pulls offset piece after set piece.”
