= Emma Tremblay =

Canadian actress

- Born: April 21, 2004 (age 22); Vancouver, British Columbia, Canada
- Occupation: Actress
- Years active: 2013–present
- Relatives: Jacob Tremblay (brother)

Emma C. Tremblay (born April 21, 2004) is a Canadian actress. She is known for her roles on the television series Supergirl and Wayward Pines and the films Elysium, The Giver, and The Judge.

== Personal life ==
Tremblay is the first born child of Christina and Jason Tremblay, and older sister of actors Jacob Tremblay and Erica Tremblay.

== Filmography ==
=== Film ===
Year	Title	Role	Notes
2013	Elysium	Matilda	
2014	The Giver	Lilly	
2014	The Judge	Lauren Palmer	
2017	Juliana & the Medicine Fish	Juliana Reid	
2017	Wonder	Michelle	
2018	Night Hunter	Faye	
2023	Aliens Abducted My Parents and Now I Feel Kinda Left Out	Itsy	
2024	The Girl Who Wasn't Dead	Erica Bennett	

=== Television ===
Year	Title	Role	Notes
2013	Let It Snow	Amanda	Television film
2014	Santa's Little Ferrets	Elsa Collins	Television film
2015	The Whispers	Tania	Episode: "Hide & Seek"
2016	Wayward Pines	Lucy	7 episodes
2017	Loudermilk	Lizzy	Episode: "Invitation Only"
2017	Psych: The Movie	Iris Vick	Television film
2017–2018	Supergirl	Ruby Arias	15 episodes
2022	Caught in His Web	Gabby	Television film
2022	The Midnight Club	Athena	1 episode
