= Grace Van Dien =

American actress (born 1996)

Caroline Dorothy Grace Van Dien
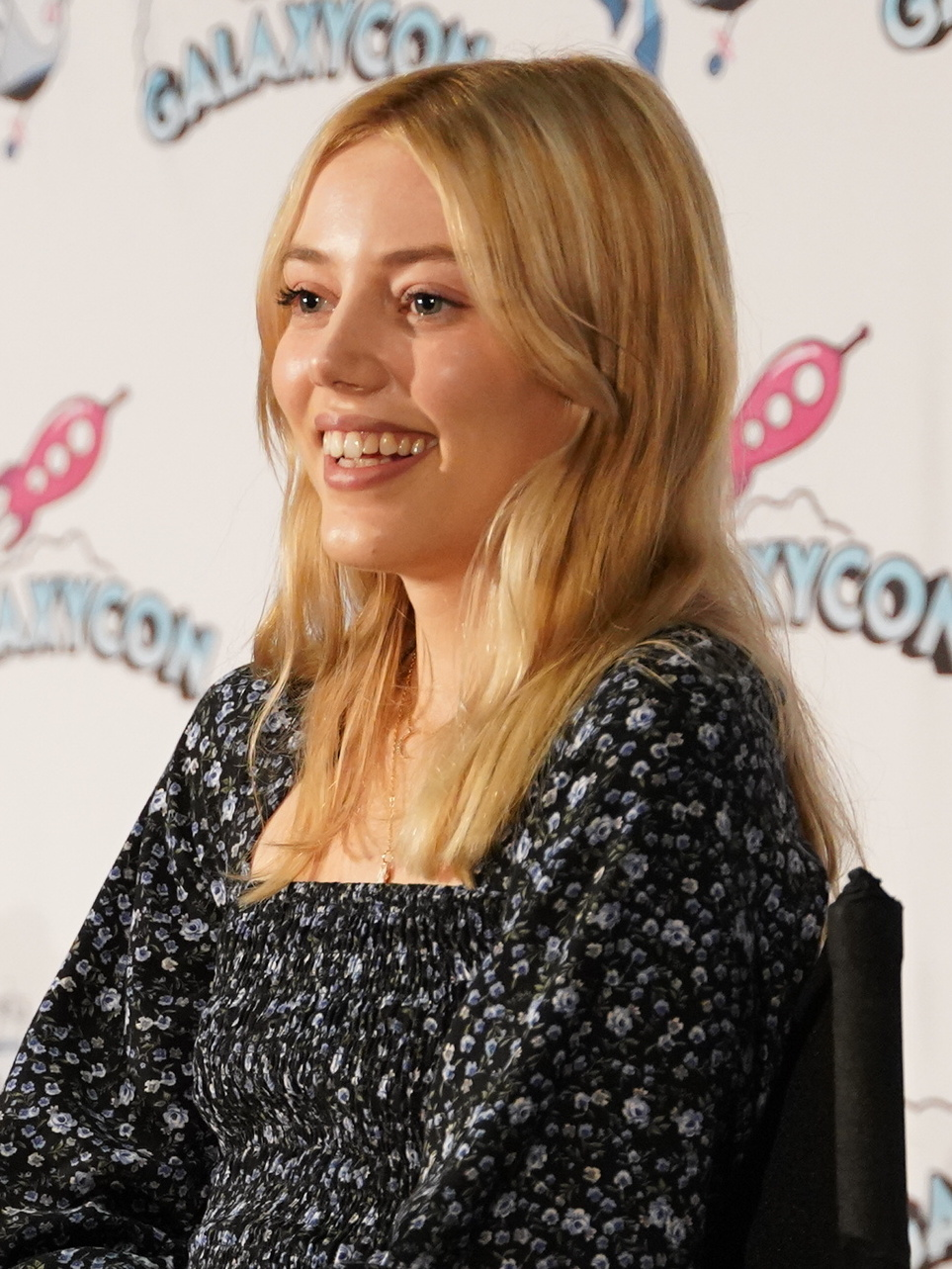
- Van Dien in 2022
- Born: October 15, 1996 (age 30); Los Angeles, California, U.S.
- Occupation: Actress
- Years active: 2005–present
- Parent: Casper Van Dien (father)
- Relatives: Christopher Mitchum (grandfather); Robert Mitchum (great-grandfather); John Mitchum (great-great-uncle)

Caroline Dorothy Grace Van Dien (born October 15, 1996) is an American actress. She is most notably known for playing Chrissy Cunningham in Stranger Things (2022) and starring in Roost (AKA What Comes Around), which premiered at the 49th Toronto International Film Festival. She has also played Brooke Osmond in the Netflix teen drama series Greenhouse Academy (2017) and Katie Campbell in NBC drama series The Village (2019). She also portrayed Sharon Tate in the Mary Harron–directed film Charlie Says (2018).

== Early life ==
Caroline Dorothy Grace Van Dien was born on Tuesday, 15 October 1996, in Los Angeles, California. She is the daughter of actors Casper Van Dien and Carrie Mitchum, and the great-granddaughter of Hollywood Golden Age star Robert Mitchum. She is also the great-great-niece to John Mitchum. Van Dien has one older brother, a half brother, and two half-sisters. On her father's side, Van Dien has Dutch, Swedish, French, and English ancestry.

== Career ==
In 2005, Van Dien appeared with her family in the reality series I Married a Princess, which aired on the Lifetime Television channel in the United States. On the acting side, Van Dien played several small roles in her father's films throughout her childhood. Prior to pursuing acting, Van Dien intended to become a writer. Van Dien discovered her passion for acting while filming Sleeping Beauty (2014). Between 2015 and 2017, she appeared in numerous television films, independent films and had guest starring roles in the television series Code Black and White Famous.

Van Dien's first major television role was playing Brooke Osmond in the Netflix teen drama series Greenhouse Academy; a role she played in the series' first two seasons (2017–2019). In 2018, she starred as Sharon Tate in the biographical film Charlie Says, which had its world premiere at the 75th Venice International Film Festival. In 2019, Van Dien was cast in the starring role of Katie Campbell in the NBC drama series The Village, which was cancelled after one season.

In May 2022, Van Dien guest starred in the fourth season of the Netflix series Stranger Things, playing Chrissy Cunningham, a popular (but troubled) cheerleader at Hawkins High School.

In September 2023, she signed with WME.

=== Twitch streaming ===
In 2021, Van Dien began streaming on live streaming service Twitch, reaching over 200,000 followers within three months of starting her channel. Van Dien, who occasionally streams 'just chatting' sessions and Valorant gameplay, has said that streaming provides her with the opportunity to control her own voice. She signed with United Talent Agency for representation in August 2022. In May 2023, Van Dien joined gaming organization FaZe Clan as a content creator. She left the organization after a dispute with Nordan Shat, also known as "FaZe Rain". Since September 2023, WME represents her exclusively.

== Filmography ==
Key
†	Denotes films that have not yet been released

=== Film ===
Year	Title	Role	Notes	Ref.
2014	Sleeping Beauty	Princess Dawn		
2015	San Andreas Quake	Ali		
2015	Fire Twister	Girlfriend		
2016	Army Dog	Tara Holloway		
2016	Storage Locker 181	Grace		
2016	Patient Seven	Jessa / Patient Five		
2017	Awaken the Shadowman	Samantha		
2018	Charlie Says	Sharon Tate		
2018	Ahh! Roach!	Bree Johnson		
2020	Riding Faith	Grace		
2020	Lady Driver	Ellie Lansing		
2020	The Binge	Lena		
2022	V for Vengeance	Scarlett		
2022	What Comes Around	Anna	Originally titled Roost	
2024	Somnium	Dakota	Originally titled Alaska	
2024	The Fix	Ella McPhee		
2024	Silver Star	Franny		
2025	Redux Redux	Anna Kelly		
2026	Silver Star	Franny		
TBA	Killing of a Nation †	TBA	Post-production	
TBA	Beg the Devil †	TBA	Filming	
TBA	The One Before The One †	Beth	Post-production	

=== Television ===
Year	Title	Role	Notes
2005	I Married a Princess	Herself	Reality television series
2010	The Dog Who Saved Christmas Vacation	Randy's Daughter	Television film; credited as Caroline Grace Van Dien
2015	Code Black	Friend One	Episode: "Pre-Existing Conditions"
2016	Max	Ruby	Unsold television pilot
2016	The Bad Twin	Olivia / Quinn	Television film
2017	Escaping Dad	Amy	Television film
2017	White Famous	Ryann	Episodes: "Woo", "Duality"
2017–2018	Greenhouse Academy	Brooke Osmond	Main role (seasons 1–2)
2019	The Village	Katie Campbell	Main role
2019	What Just Happened??! with Fred Savage	Tori	Episode: "Havenbrook"
2019	The Rookie	Olivia	Episode: "Tough Love"
2021	Immoral Compass	Tally	Episode: "Part 4: Parenthood"
2022	Stranger Things	Chrissy Cunningham	Episode: "Chapter One: The Hellfire Club"

=== Other projects ===
- "Cool People in LA" (2019) music video by Bret James, directed by Bianca Poletti
- Monsters and Muses (2020), short film in which she plays Persephone, directed by herself
- "Julius Caesar Live" (2022), live performance by Acting for a Cause in which she played Calphurnia, directed and produced by Brando Crawford
- BlackBoxTV Presents: Scream Park (2022) video game, in which she plays Kelly Q, written and directed by Tony E. Valenzuela
- "QTC's Murder Mystery" (2023) live show, in which she played the Cheshire Cat, produced by QTCinderella
