= The Giver (film) =

2014 film by Phillip Noyce

- Theatrical release poster
- Directed by: Phillip Noyce
- Screenplay by: Michael Mitnick; Robert B. Weide
- Based on: The Giver by Lois Lowry
- Produced by: Nikki Silver; Jeff Bridges; Neil Koenigsberg
- Starring: Jeff Bridges; Meryl Streep; Brenton Thwaites; Alexander Skarsgård; Katie Holmes; Taylor Swift; Cameron Monaghan; Odeya Rush; Emma Tremblay
- Cinematography: Ross Emery
- Edited by: Barry Alexander Brown
- Music by: Marco Beltrami
- Production company: Walden Media
- Distributed by: The Weinstein Company
- Release dates: August 11, 2014 (Ziegfeld Theatre); August 15, 2014 (United States)
- Running time: 97 minutes
- Country: United States
- Language: English
- Budget: $25 million
- Box office: $67 million

The Giver is a 2014 American dystopian drama film directed by Phillip Noyce and starring Jeff Bridges, Brenton Thwaites, Odeya Rush, Meryl Streep, Alexander Skarsgård, Katie Holmes, Cameron Monaghan, Taylor Swift, and Emma Tremblay. The film is based on the 1993 young adult novel by Lois Lowry. The Giver premiered on August 11, 2014, was released theatrically in the United States on August 15, 2014 and received a People's Choice Award nomination for "Favorite Dramatic Movie".

== Plot ==
Following a calamity referred to as "the Ruin," society has been reorganized, taking away any sense of emotion, good or bad. Babies are conceived through genetic engineering, and neuroleptic-like medications suppress strong emotions and sexual desire. All memories of old are held by one person, the Receiver of Memory, to shield the rest of the community. The Receiver and his protégé are the only people able to see in color, which is otherwise eliminated from the community to prevent envy. The community is ruled by elders, including the Chief Elder.

Jonas, who lives in the community, is a 16-year-old boy whose best friends are Asher and Fiona.

On graduation day, Jonas is told that he will become the next Receiver of Memory and will progressively receive memories of history from his predecessor, the Giver. During his training with the Giver, Jonas gradually learns about the past and about joy, pain, death, and love. He stops taking his daily injections (which had stopped him from dreaming and thinking about Fiona, for whom he has feelings) and begins to experience emotion.

Jonas learns the memories received from the Giver and accidentally shares his memories with a baby, Gabriel, who was brought home by his father. He develops a close relationship with Gabriel upon discovering that they share a birthmark, the mark of a potential Receiver of Memory, and both can see in color.

Those who leave the community are said to have been "Released to Elsewhere", but Jonas learns that to be a euphemism for euthanasia by injection (via a video of his father Releasing a twin). Jonas also learns the Giver's daughter, Rosemary, had preceded Jonas as Receiver of Memory. When she began her training, however, Rosemary became so distraught from the memories that she received that she asked to be Released.

Appalled by the deception of his community and the Elders' disregard for human life, Jonas comes to believe that everyone should have memories of the past. Eventually, the Giver and Jonas decide that the only way to help the community is for Jonas to travel past the border of their land to "Elsewhere". Doing so would release memories and color back into the community. When Jonas tries to leave his neighborhood, he encounters Asher, who tries to stop him, but Jonas punches him. Jonas, with Fiona's help, retrieves Gabriel, who is to be Released for having failed to meet a developmental milestone at the Nurturing Center.

Meanwhile, Jonas's mother and Asher go to the Chief Elder to say that Jonas is missing. Jonas steals a motorcycle and drives away with Gabriel. Asher is assigned by the Chief Elder to use a drone to find Jonas and "take" him (another euphemism for murder). When Asher finds Jonas and Gabriel in the desert, Jonas beseeches Asher to trust him and to let them go. Instead, Asher captures them with the drone but, having a change of heart, sets them free by dropping them into a river. When he is questioned by the Chief Elder, Asher bends the truth and says that he has followed her orders.

Fiona is condemned to be Released for helping Jonas. Just as she is about to be Released by Jonas' father, the Giver tries to persuade the Chief Elder that the Elders should free the community. Unmoved by the Giver's arguments, the Chief Elder asserts that freedom is a bad idea because when they are left to their own devices, people make bad choices.

Jonas and Gabriel enter a snowy area. Jonas falls to the ground and is overcome by the cold weather. However, he sees a sled like the one that he rode in a memory that he had received from the Giver. Jonas and Gabriel ride the sled downhill and cross the border into Elsewhere, which frees their community and also saves Fiona's life as Jonas' father stops short of Releasing her upon realizing his intentions.

As Jonas reaches a house where people are singing Christmas carols inside, he realizes that he has succeeded in his quest, as he walks toward the house with Gabriel.

== Cast ==
- Jeff Bridges as The Giver
- Meryl Streep as Chief Elder
- Brenton Thwaites as Jonas
- Alexander Skarsgård as Jonas' father
- Katie Holmes as Jonas' mother
- Odeya Rush as Fiona
- Cameron Monaghan as Asher
- Taylor Swift as Rosemary
- Emma Tremblay as Lily
- Thabo Rametsi as Robbie

== Production ==
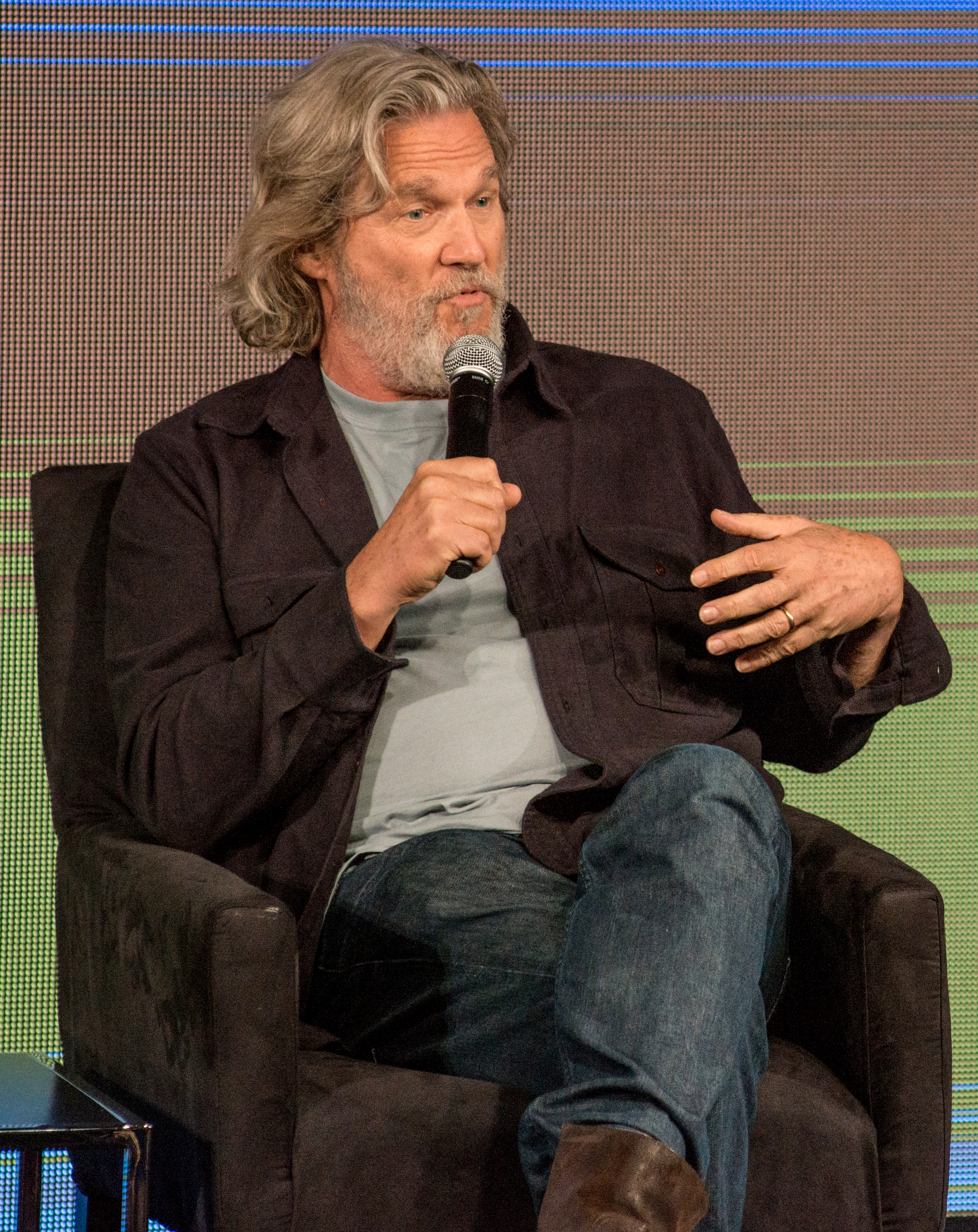
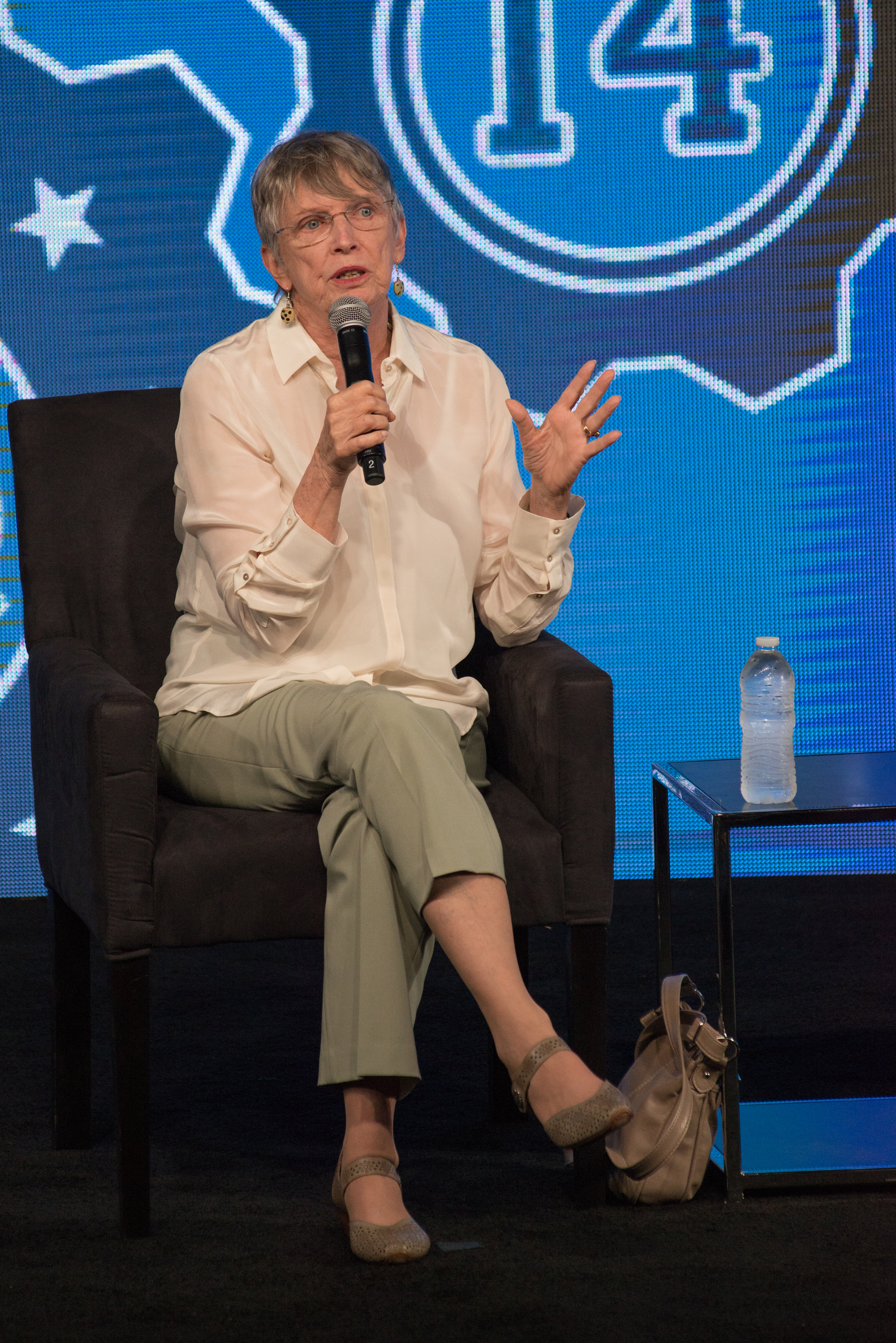
Jeff Bridges and author Lois Lowry at events for the film in 2014

Jeff Bridges initially wanted to film the movie in the mid-1990s, and a script was written by 1998. Various barriers prevented production of the film, including Warner Bros. buying the rights in 2007. The rights were finally bought by The Weinstein Company and Walden Media.

Bridges originally intended that his own father, Lloyd Bridges, would play the title character, The Giver, but he died in 1998, before the project could be started.

Principal photography began on October 7, 2013, in Cape Town and Johannesburg. Meryl Streep had some of her scenes shot in England, where she was also filming Rob Marshall's Into the Woods. Later she completed before additional filming in Paarl, a town near Cape Town. The filming was completed on February 13, 2014, in Utah.

== Music ==
The score for The Giver was composed by Marco Beltrami. The song "Ordinary Human" by OneRepublic was featured in the movie. The film also features Tori Kelly's "Silent". The soundtrack was released on August 5, 2014, by Interscope Records.

== Release ==
On July 11, 2014, it was announced that The Weinstein Company and Walden Media would be teaming up with Fathom Events to stream the red carpet premiere to more than 250 theaters in the US on August 11, four days before its official release. Ziegfeld Theatre hosted the film's premiere in New York City.

The Giver grossed $45.1 million domestically (United States and Canada) and $21.9 million in other territories, for a worldwide total of $67.0 million, against a budget of $25 million. It opened at its peak position of No. 5 at the domestic box office, and spent its first five weeks in the Top 10.

== Reception ==
On the review aggregator website Rotten Tomatoes, 34% of 167 critics' reviews are positive. The website's consensus reads: "Phillip Noyce directs The Giver with visual grace, but the movie doesn't dig deep enough into the classic source material's thought-provoking ideas." Metacritic, which uses a weighted average, assigned the film a score of 47 out of 100, based on 33 critics, indicating "mixed or average" reviews. Audiences polled by CinemaScore gave the film an average grade of "B+" on an A+ to F scale.

Richard Roeper gave the film a "C" and stated that "the magic [of the novel] gets lost in translation".

== Accolades ==
Award	Category	Nominee	Result	Ref
Denver Film Critics Society 2015	Best Original Song	"Ordinary Human"	Nominated	
Golden Trailer Awards 2015	Golden Fleece	The Weinstein Company Buddha Jones	Won	
Golden Trailer Awards 2015	Best Fantasy/Adventure TV Spot	The Weinstein Company Aspect	Nominated	
Heartland Film 2014	Truly Moving Picture Award	Phillip Noyce Asis Productions The Weinstein Company	Won	
Hollywood Music In Media Awards (HMMA) 2014	Outstanding Music Supervision - Film	Dana Sano	Nominated	
Hollywood Music In Media Awards (HMMA) 2014	Best Soundtrack Album	The Giver	Nominated	
Movieguide Awards 2015	The Faith and Freedom Award for Movies	The Giver	Won	
41st People's Choice Awards	Favorite Dramatic Movie	The Giver	Nominated	
The Joey Awards 2014	Young Actress Age 9 or Younger in a Feature Film Leading Role	Emma Tremblay	Nominated	

== See also ==
- Æon Flux
- List of films featuring drones
- Logan's Run
