= The Heart Is a Muscle (film) =

2025 South African crime thriller film

- Promotional release poster
- Directed by: Imran Hamdulay
- Screenplay by: Imran Hamdulay
- Produced by: Imran Hamdulay; Brett Michael Innes; Khosie Dali
- Starring: Keenan Arrison; Melissa De Vries; Loren Loubser; Dean Marais
- Cinematography: Kabeer Shaik
- Edited by: Paul Speirs
- Music by: Tapiwa Musvosvi
- Production company: The Star Film Company
- Distributed by: Indigenous Film Distribution
- Release date: 17 February 2025 (Berlinale)
- Running time: 89 minutes
- Countries: South Africa; Saudi Arabia
- Languages: Afrikaans; English

The Heart Is a Muscle is a 2025 South African crime thriller film written, co-produced and directed by Imran Hamdulay, in his directorial debut. It follows a young father's search for a better version of himself, and of masculinity, trans-generational trauma and healing.

The film had its world premiere at the Panorama section of the 74th Berlin International Film Festival on 17 February 2024, where it won the Ecumenical Jury Prize. It was selected as the South African entry for the Best International Feature Film at the 98th Academy Awards, but it was not nominated.

== Synopsis ==
Set in Cape Town, the film follows Ryan who is in his mid-30s and Laila, his wife. Both are raising their young son, Jude with love. During Jude's fifth birthday celebration, he suddenly goes missing, prompting a frantic search. Ryan is led to believe that Jude may have been taken into a gang-controlled area and, in a moment of desperation, assaults a man suspected of involvement. Upon returning home, Ryan discovers that Jude had been hiding there all along playing a prank. The incident forces Ryan to confront his own history of violence and initiates a journey toward personal redemption.

== Cast ==
- Keenan Arrison as Ryan
- Melissa De Vries as Laila
- Loren Loubser as Meghan
- Dean Marais as André
- Ridaa Adams as Zaheer
- Danny Ross as Anees
- Troy Paulse as Jude
- Lincoln Van Wyk as Leslie

== Production ==
The Heart is a Muscle was shot in Cape Town, South Africa, on the Cape Flats Hamdulay intentionally chose the Flats as the setting, a historically marginalized area shaped by apartheid and often reduced in cinema to stereotypes of gangs and drugs. Drawing on his own experience of the community, the director sought to offer a more nuanced portrayal of everyday life. As he explained, “I wanted to offer a picture of what it really looks like — the music, the streets, the community. Something cinema hasn’t always given people from the Flats.”

The film was produced on a micro budget of $200,000 with backing from the National Film and Video Foundation (South Africa), the Indigenous Film Distribution (South Africa) and the Red Sea Fund (Saudi Arabia).

== Release ==
The Heart Is a Muscle had its world premiere in the Panorama section of the 75th Berlin International Film Festival on 17 February 2025.

The film featured at the 72nd Sydney Film Festival in the Features section on 12 June 2025. In February 2026, it had its United States premiere in the feature films section of the 41st Santa Barbara International Film Festival.

World distribution is handled by a French sales company MMM Film Sales.

== Accolades ==
Award	Date of ceremony	Category	Recipient	Result	Ref.
Berlin International Film Festival	23 February 2025	Panorama Audience Award for Best Feature Film	The Heart Is a Muscle	Nominated	
Berlin International Film Festival	23 February 2025	Prize of the Ecumenical Jury	The Heart Is a Muscle	Won	
The Silwerskermfees	23 August 2025	Best Feature Film	The Heart Is a Muscle	Won	

== See also ==
- List of submissions to the 98th Academy Awards for Best International Feature Film
- List of South African submissions for the Academy Award for Best International Feature Film
