= Keenan Arrison =

South African actor & singer (born 1981)

- Born: Keenan Angelo Arrison; 23 February 1981 (age 45); Cape Town, South Africa
- Education: AFDA, The School for the Creative Economy
- Occupations: Actor, Director, Voice artist, Singer
- Years active: 2006–present

Keenan Angelo Arrison (born 23 February 1981) is a South African actor, director, voice artist and singer. He is best known for his lead role in the feature film The Heart is a Muscle, South Africa's entry for the Best International Feature Film at the 98th Academy Awards, and prominent roles in South African television series such as The Wild, After 9 and Shooting Stars.

== Personal life ==
Arrison was born on 23 February 1981 in Cape Town, South Africa. He is a BA degree graduate in Live Performance and Motion Picture from AFDA, The School for the Creative Economy.

== Career ==
In 2006, he wrote and directed two short films: Ongeriewe and Freedom Days, where the former was a Cannes-nominated piece. In 2007, he played the role "Roland" in the SABC1 drama series Divers Down. In the same year, he joined with the e.tv soccer drama Shooting Stars and played the role of "Clinton Arendse", a popular popular with viewers and that he play through the third season in 2010. In 2009, he made his film debut with Shirley Adams and played the role "Donovan Adams". Between 2011 and 2012 he appeared in the M-Net soap opera The Wild in the lead role of "Ashwin Fernandez".

In 2013, Keenan had a minor role as "Doctor" in the second season of the SABC1 drama series Skeem Saam. In the same year, he joined with the SABC1 drama series After 9 in its second season in the lead role of "Zane Matthews". The following year, he appeared in three television series: the SABC2 mystery thriller Swartwater as "Vincent," the SABC1 anthology miniseries When We Were Black as "Shaheed Aziz," and the M-Net Edge drama fantasy Dominion as "Brother Paul.

In 2016, he took on the supporting role of "James" in the kykNET police procedural Die Byl. Then in 2017, he joined the network's drama serial Sara se Geheim as "Danny" for its first and second seasons. In 2018, he acted in the Hollywood adventure film Tomb Raider. In 2019, he appeared in the M-Net miniseries Trackers as "Ibrahim November". In 2020, he acted in the serials: Siende Blind with role "Ricky" and The Riviera with role "Naz Isaacs". In 2021, he joined with the cast of seventeenth season of popular kykNET soap opera Binnelanders.

In 2025 took on the lead role of Adam in the Cape Town based drama The Heart is a Muscle. The film premiered and received critical acclaim at the Berlinale in 2025.

== Filmography ==
Year	Film	Role	Genre	Ref.
2006	Ongeriewe	Charlie	Short film	
2006	Freedom Days	Keenan	Short film	
2007	Barren	Keenan Barrendse	Short film	
2007	Divers Down	Roland	TV series	
2007	Interrogation Room	Davie	TV series	
2009	Shooting Stars	Clinton Arendse	TV series	
2009	Shirley Adams	Donovan Adams	Film	
2011	Skeem	Claude Jnr	Film	
2011	The Wild	Ashwin Fernandez	TV series	
2013	SAF3	Ario Rivera	TV series	
2013	Skeem Saam	Doctor	TV series	
2013	After 9	Zane Matthews	TV series	
2013	To the Passerby	Blind man	Short film	
2014	Swartwater	Vincent / Ashwin	TV series	
2014	When We Were Black	Shaheed Aziz	TV series	
2014	Dominion	Brother Paul	TV series	
2016	Die Byl	James	TV series	
2016	Twee Grade van Moord	Ra'ed Shad	Film	
2017	Accident	Thomas	Film	
2017	Sara se Geheim	Danny	TV series	
2018	Tomb Raider	Mercenary	Film	
2019	Trackers	Ibrahim November	TV series	
2020	Siende Blind	Ricky	TV series	
2020	The Riviera	Naz Isaacs	TV series	
2021	Binnelanders	Martin	TV series	
2021	Atlantis	Nazeem	Film	
2025	The Heart Is a Muscle	Ryan	Crime thriller film	
