= Kelsey Egan =

American-South African filmmaker

- Born: 20 March 1983 (age 43); Wisconsin, U.S.
- Education: Vassar College
- Years active: 2003–present
- Organisation: Writers Guild of South Africa
- Website: kelseyegan.com

Kelsey-Colin Kass Egan WGSA (born 20 March 1983) is an American-South African filmmaker, actress, and stunt performer. She founded the Cape Town-based production company Crave Pictures. Her short film Gargoyle (2009) and science fiction film Glasshouse (2021) were nominated for SAFTAs.

== Early and personal life ==
Egan is from Wisconsin and attended Whitefish Bay High School. She took a course at the British American Drama Academy in London. She double majored in Drama and Neuroscience and Behavior at Vassar College, graduating in 2005. She briefly lived in New York City and Beijing before moving to Johannesburg in 2008. She holds dual citizenship.

== Career ==
=== Filmmaking ===
To gain experience in the industry, Egan decided to begin her career working both in front of the camera and on sets behind the scenes. She was a production assistant for the documentary Trumbo (2007) and the films I Am Legend (2007), Stop-Loss (2008), and Deception (2008), and a production coordinator for the films Mr. Bones 2: Back from the Past (2008) and Gugu and Andile (2008) as well as the Sky One series Strike Back (2011). She was a script supervisor for Neill Blomkamp's District 9 (2009).

Egan's first short film Gargoyle, filmed in 2008, was nominated for Best Short Film at the 2010 South African Film and Television Awards. Her other short films include 21th Street (2010), Red Herring (2014), The Bull (2018), and The Fighter (2019).

Egan was a VFX producer for the 2014 adaptation of The Giver and cast assistant on the sets of the films Eye in the Sky (2015) and The Dark Tower (2017). She wrote on seven episodes of the 2018 children's animated series Munki and Trunk as well as on the 2019 M-Net crime thriller miniseries Trackers.

While The Fix was postponed, Egan began collaborating with screenwriter Emma Lungiswa de Wet on a slate of three "grounded" science fiction films for Local Motion Pictures. The first of the slate Glasshouse was written over Zoom during the COVID-19 lockdown and filmed on location in the Eastern Cape in late 2020. The film premiered at the 2021 Fantasia Film Festival, officially marking Egan's feature directorial debut, followed by a wide release in 2022. Glasshouse received six nominations at the South African Film and Television Awards that year, including Best Feature Film, winning five of them.

On October 31, 2024, Egan's sci-fi dystopian feature, The Fix was released on Showmax and set for wider international release on November 22. Other projects in development include Outer Edges, and the latter two films in her slate with Lungiswa de Wet.

=== Acting and stunt work ===
Egan first did stunt work for Death Race 3: Inferno. She made her television debut in 2012 as a stunt performer in the Channel 4 historical miniseries Labyrinth. She played Nicole Weiss in the 2013 crime film Zulu. For Mad Max: Fury Road, Egan alongside the other stunt performers won the Screen Actors Guild Award for Outstanding Stunt Ensemble. She was Claire Foy's stunt double in the first season of The Crown on Netflix and Jane de Wet's in the BBC America adaptation of Terry Pratchett's The Watch. She played Honey in the dark comedy film Fried Barry and Siri in the Afrikaans romantic comedy Kaalgat Karel.

== Filmography ==
=== Filmmaking ===
Film
Year	Title	Director	Writer	Producer	Notes
2008	Waiting in Beijing			Assistant	
2008	Homo Sapien	1AD			Short film
2009	Flat Love	1AD			Short film
2009	District 9		Supervisor		
2009	Gargoyle	Yes	Yes	Yes	Short film
2010	Khuthala Bo!	2UD		Yes	Short film
2010	21th Street	Yes	Yes	Yes	Short film
2014	Red Herring	Yes	Yes		Short film
2014	The Giver			VFX	
2018	The Bull	Yes	Yes	Yes	Short film
2019	The Fighter		Yes		Short film
2021	Glasshouse	Yes	Yes		Feature directorial debut
2024	The Fix	Yes	Yes	Yes	
TBA	Outer Edges	Yes			
TBA	I Carry You Always	Yes	Yes		
TBA	Untitled third slate film				

Television
Year	Title	Director	Writer	Producer	Notes
2018–2020	Munki and Trunk		Yes		7 episodes
2019	Trackers		Yes		Miniseries; 5 episodes

Music videos
Year	Song	Artist	Notes
2010	"My Baby Don't Love Me No More"	The Death Valley Blues Band	Director, writer, producer
2012	"Rum Trifle"	Jakkals	Director, writer
2012	"Gunuza"	Bongeziwe Mabandla	Editor, producer

=== Acting and stunt work ===
Film
Year	Title	Role	Notes
2003	Making Revolution	Activist	
2005	Discover Me	Rachel	
2013	Death Race 3: Inferno	Stunts	
2013	Zulu	Nicole Weiss	
2014	Red Herring	Rider	Short film
2015	Destination		Short film
2015	Mad Max: Fury Road	Stunts	
2016	Forever (Afrikaans: Vir Altyd)	Cat	
2020	Fried Barry	Honey	
2021	Kaalgat Karel	Siri	

Television
Year	Title	Role	Notes
2012	Labyrinth	Stunts	Miniseries; 2 episodes
2013	Kids Rule	Stunts (Tommy Wiebeck)	Television film
2013	Striving for Freedom	Stunts (Gräfin Cecilie von Hohenberg)	Television film
2014	Shark Week	Lindsay	Episode: "Shark of Darkness: Wrath of Submarine"
2015	Clan of the Cave Bear	Stunts (Ayla)	Television film
2016	Of Kings and Prophets	Servant	Episode: "Offerings of Blood"
2016	The Crown	Stunts (Elizabeth II)	Episode: "Pride & Joy"
2020	Raised by Wolves	Soldier	Episode: "Virtual Faith"
2020	Warrior	Mrs. Kellerman	Episode: "Not How We Do Business"
2021	The Watch	Stunts (Alice Band)	Episode: "Better to Light a Candle"

Music videos
Year	Song	Artist	Notes
2014	"Lights Out" (ft JungFreud)	PHFAT	

=== Other credits ===
Year	Title	Role	Notes
2007	Trumbo	Production assistant	Documentary
2007	I Am Legend	Production assistant	
2008	Stop-Loss	Production assistant	
2008	Deception	Production assistant	
2008	Mr. Bones 2: Back from the Past	Coordinator	
2008	Gugu and Andile	Production coordinator	Television film
2011	Strike Back	Assistant production coordinator	6 episodes
2015	Eye in the Sky	Cast assistant	
2017	The Dark Tower	Cast assistant	
