= Glasshouse (film) =

- Film release poster
- Directed by: Kelsey Egan
- Written by: Emma Lungiswa de Wet; Kelsey Egan
- Produced by: Greig Buckle
- Starring: Jessica Alexander; Anja Taljaard; Hilton Pelser
- Cinematography: Justus de Jager
- Edited by: Rowan Jackson
- Music by: Patrick Cannell
- Production companies: Local Motion Pictures; Crave Pictures; Rigel Films
- Distributed by: MultiChoice Studios; Showmax
- Release date: 16 August 2021; (Fantasia)
- Country: South Africa
- Language: English

Glasshouse is a 2021 South African dystopian thriller film directed by Kelsey Egan in her feature debut and co-written by Egan and Emma Lungiswa de Wet. It premiered at the 2021 Fantasia International Film Festival.

The first in a trio, it was made available to stream on DStv's Box Office and on Showmax in February 2022. Following a screening at the 2021 Sci-Fi-London, it had a 10 January 2022 digital release in the United Kingdom distributed by Signature Entertainment.

The film received six nominations at the 2022 South African Film and Television Awards, including Best Feature Film, winning five of them.

== Premise ==
As a dementia-like toxin that wipes people's memories known as the Shred spreads, a family of a mother, three daughters, and one son isolate themselves in a greenhouse, which the mother calls the Sanctuary. Their ritualistic idyll is disrupted when the eldest daughter invites a wounded stranger into their home.

== Cast ==
- Jessica Alexander as Bee
- Anja Taljaard as Evie
- Hilton Pelser as the Stranger
- Adrienne Pearce as Mother
- Brent Vermeulen as Gabe
- Kitty Harris as Daisy

== Production ==
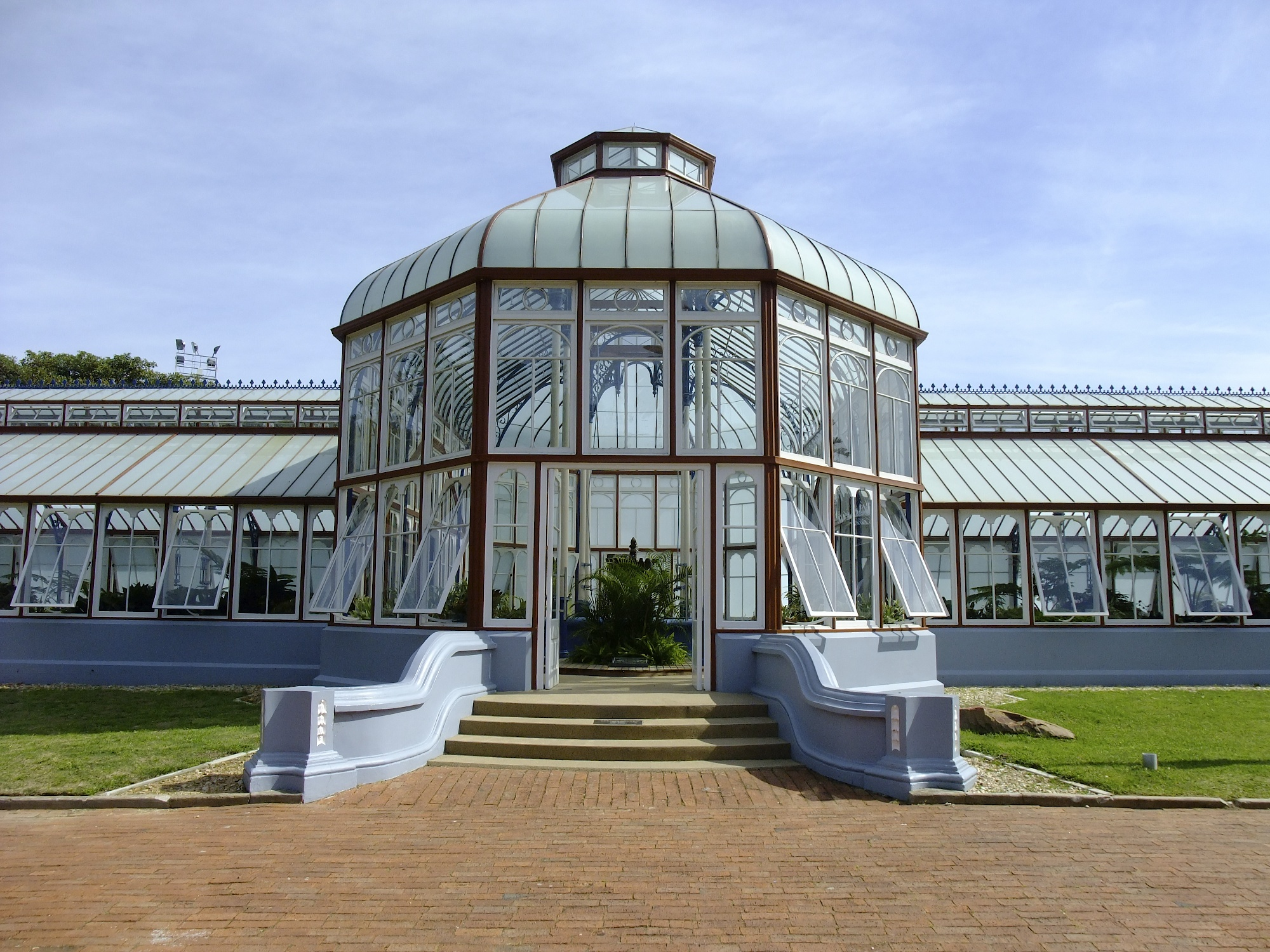
The Pearson Conservatory (2012).

Principal photography took place in the Eastern Cape beginning in October 2020. De Wet, who grew up in the province, wrote the script with the Pearson Conservatory at St George's Park in mind. Nelson Mandela Bay Municipality granted the creators permission to use it as a filming location for six weeks, and they hired local crew for the film.

== Reception ==
Rotten Tomatoes reported an approval rating of 90% based on 20 reviews, with an average rating of 7.7/10.

=== Awards and nominations ===
Year	Award	Category	Nominee(s)	Result	Ref.
2022	Film Threat's Award This!	Indie Sci-Fi	Glasshouse	Pending	
2022	Film Threat's Award This!	Directress	Kelsey Egan	Pending	
2022	South African Film and Television Awards	Best Feature Film	Glasshouse	Nominated	
2022	South African Film and Television Awards	Best Achievement in Editing – Feature Film	Rowan Jackson	Won	
2022	South African Film and Television Awards	Best Achievement in Cinematography – Feature Film	Justus de Jager	Won	
2022	South African Film and Television Awards	Best Achievement in Production Design – Feature Film	Kerry von Lillienfeld	Won	
2022	South African Film and Television Awards	Best Achievement in Costume Design – Feature Film	Catherine McIntosh	Won	
2022	South African Film and Television Awards	Best Achievement in Make-up and Hairstyling – Feature Film	Annie Butler	Won	
