= Frankenwald Estate =

Farm estate in South Africa

The Frankenwald estate is a 290 hectare site located in South Africa between Alexandra, Marlboro and Kelvin. The estate was bequeathed by Alfred Beit in 1905 as deed of gift to the former Colony of Transvaal on condition that it was “solely and only” used for educational and scientific purposes. The farm was donated with the purpose of establishing a Transvaal University. This land was transferred to Wits in 1987. In 2000, the Maharishi religious order offered to purchase and build a 108 story building on the estate, promising accommodation for 50,000 people and to provide 15,000 jobs, but the deal was not concluded.

In the Wits 2017 annual report an announcement was made about the establishment of a property investment vehicle arranged around Frankenwald with the rational that this would generate significant annuity income. On 8 September 2024, Wits University announced the transfer of the Frankenwald Estate to the Bankenveld District City Development Company. Critics believe that this action betrays Beit’s deed of gift and deprives surrounding communities of access to educational facilities. The special endowment fund will be created from the sale and used to support Wits academic projects.
