= Musée de Villèle =

Museum in Saint-Paul, Reunion

Coordinates: 21°03′23″S 55°15′49″E

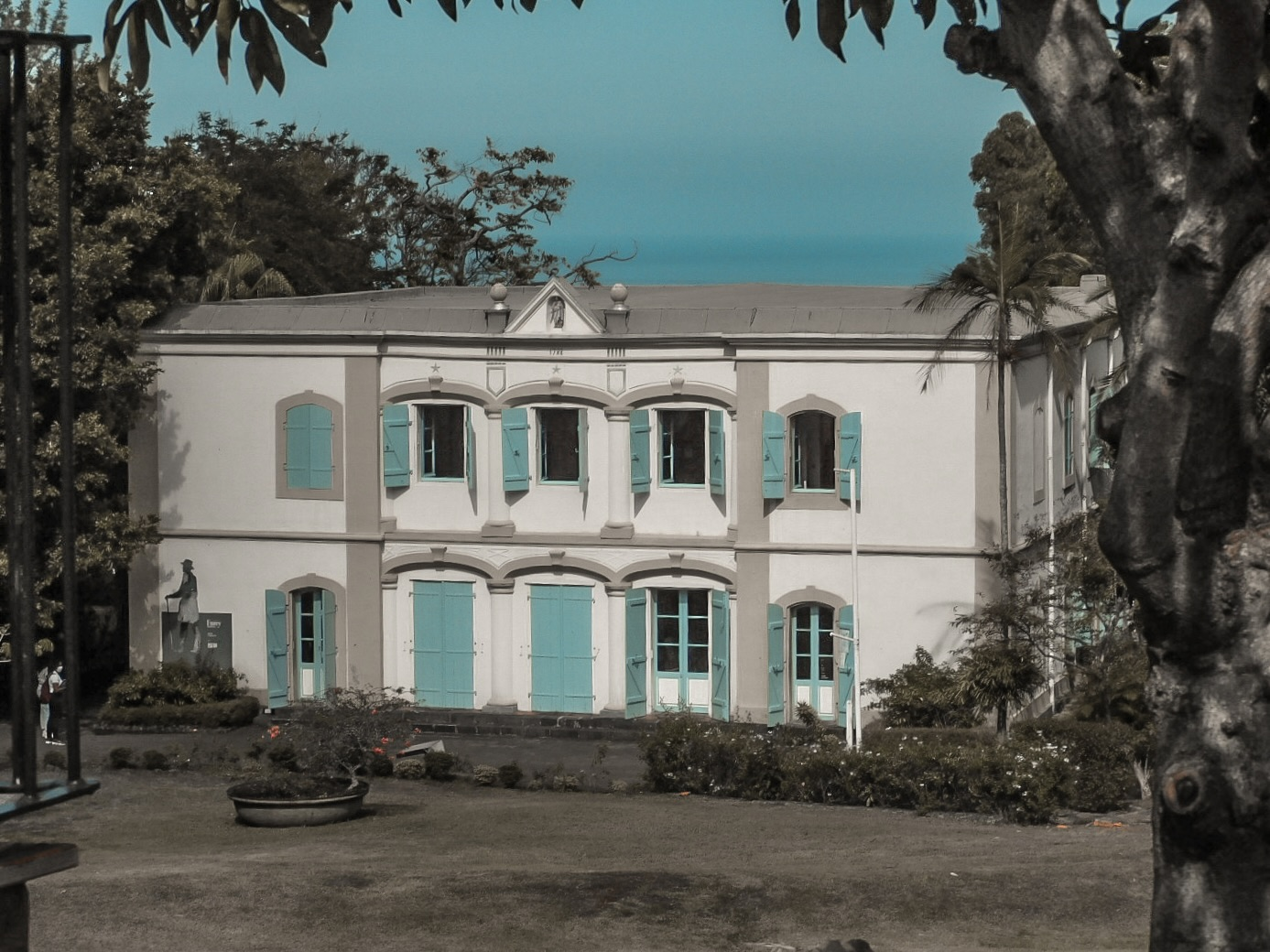
- Collections: Mobilier et objets du quotidien

The Musée historique de Villèle is one of the major museums on Reunion Island, a French overseas department in the Indian Ocean. Located in the highlands of Saint-Paul at a site known as Villèle, it is housed in the former Desbassayns estate—a vast colonial plantation where Madame Desbassayns (1755–1846) lived. She was a major landowner and slave owner in the island's history, during the era when it was still called Bourbon and was a French colony.

The collections of this institution, managed by the Department of Réunion, include furniture as well as numerous everyday objects from the past. The tour encompasses the outbuildings spread across an estate of over ten hectares—the Villèle estate—which has been listed as a Historic Monument since 2019. This includes a private chapel known as the "Chapelle Pointue", the former slave hospital, the old kitchen, and the remains of the sugar mill.

== History ==
=== Desbassayns plantation ===
The history of the estate begins in 1770 with the marriage of the white Creole Henri-Paulin Panon Desbassayns to the wealthy local heiress Ombline Gonneau (Madame Desbassayns). The numerous tracts of land inherited by the couple formed a 190-hectare holding, distributed across various sites in Saint-Paul, Saint-Leu, Saint-Gilles, and Grande Ravine. At that time, the couple owned 80 slaves, who were subject to a version of the Code Noir (Black Code) specific to Bourbon Island, in effect since 1723.

In 1797, three years before Henri-Paulin's death, the Desbassayns estate spanned approximately 750 hectares and employed 417 slaves, making it the largest on the island. In the first half of the 19th century, Madame Desbassayns and her son Charles modernized and industrialized the plantation, which had 462 enslaved people in 1829.

The abolition of slavery in 1848, followed by the crisis facing the cane sugar industry in the late 19th century, led to the decline of the plantation. The estate was ultimately transferred to the Crédit Foncier Colonial in 1960, while the last descendants retained the right to occupy the family home. In 1973, they left Réunion for mainland France.

=== Creation of the museum ===
To preserve the architectural heritage of a colonial estate, the General Council of Réunion purchased part of the property from the Crédit Foncier Colonial in 1973. The Villèle Historical Museum was established there in 1974 and inaugurated in 1976. It is the first museum created after the island became a French department in 1946.

Starting in the 2000s, the museum underwent a long period of renovation work aimed at ensuring the building's preservation and security, as well as reducing acts of vandalism. Volunteers from the association Chantiers Histoire et Architecture Médiévale took part in this work.

At the same time, signage is being installed to improve visitor flow, covering the former sugar factory located on the site as well.

In 2020, a major renovation project is planned by the Reunion Departmental Council: the museum will become the "Villèle Museum – History of the Plantation and Slavery," focusing on slavery in Bourbon.

== Elements of the former colonial plantation ==
=== Masters' house ===
The wealthy slave-owning planter Henri Paulin Panon Desbassayns—husband of Madame Desbassayns—wanted a "suitable" house that would protect his large family from the risk of fire and from cyclonic winds, against which wooden structures often offered little resistance. This explains the presence of an upper floor, the large number of rooms, and the fact that some walls are 82 cm thick.

The residence, built in 1788, is described as being of the "Malabar" type—a term originating in India—referring both to its style (featuring stacked verandas supported by four columns and a flat roof made of "argamassa") and its construction technique. It is an exact replica of the house built ten years earlier on the Chaussée Royale in Saint-Paul—now known as the Franco-Chinese School—which was itself modeled on the residence of the Governor of Pondicherry. It was built with the help of three Indian workers from the Malabar Coast. Various wooden outbuildings are scattered haphazardly behind the main house (including the masters' kitchen). Only the main house and the factory are built of masonry.

Exterior architecture

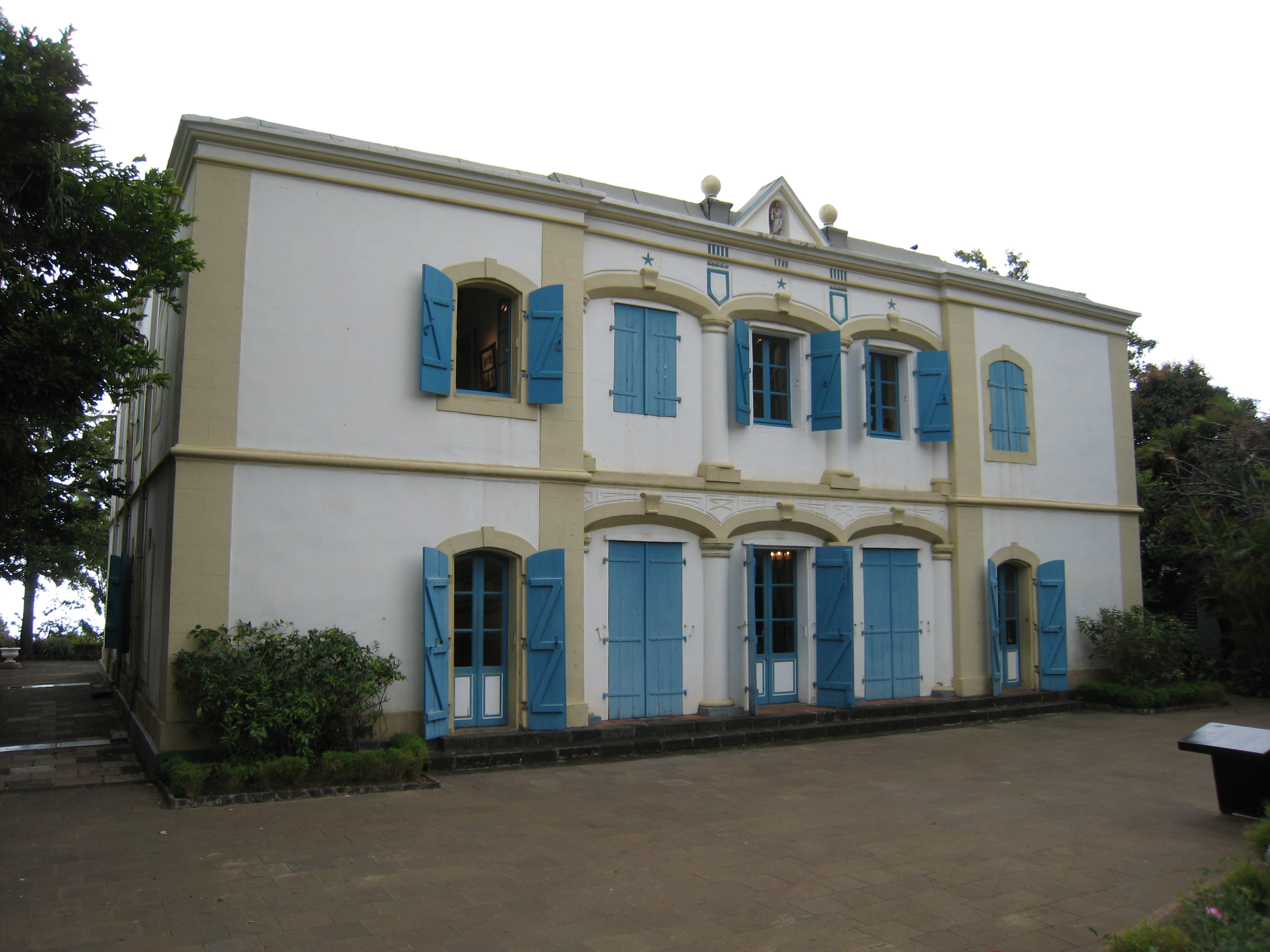
East façade of the masters' house

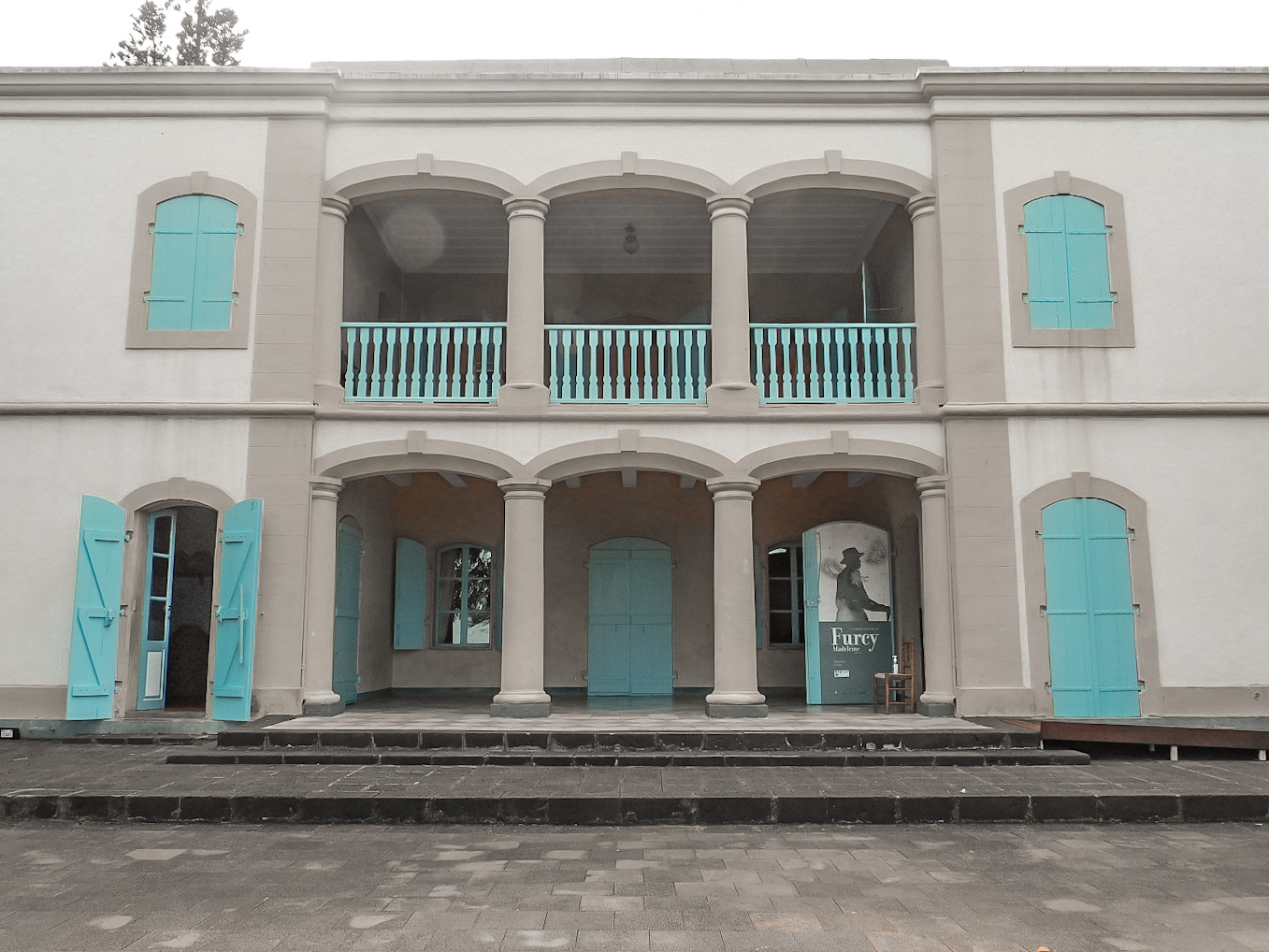
West façade with the stacked verandas

=== Slave hospital ===
The estate included a hospital set up for the slaves, in compliance with the regulation requiring such a facility based on the number of slaves held; indeed, under the royal ordinance of October 15, 1786, any plantation with more than twenty slaves was required to have a building serving as a hospital. It is a modest dressed-stone building featuring three small windowless rooms on the ground floor—two of which interconnect—and two spaces upstairs beneath the gable roof.

In the 19th century, this shelter helped combat the spread of disease. Even when sick, the enslaved people were required to perform tasks, notably the manufacture of jute sacks for transporting sugar.

In Madame Desbassayns's will, the value of Véronique—the 71-year-old enslaved nurse at the hospital—is estimated at 500 francs (roughly the same value as a Madagascar ox).

A memorial to the estate's slaves—Kaffirs, Malagasy, Indians, and Creoles—has currently been created in one of the rooms.

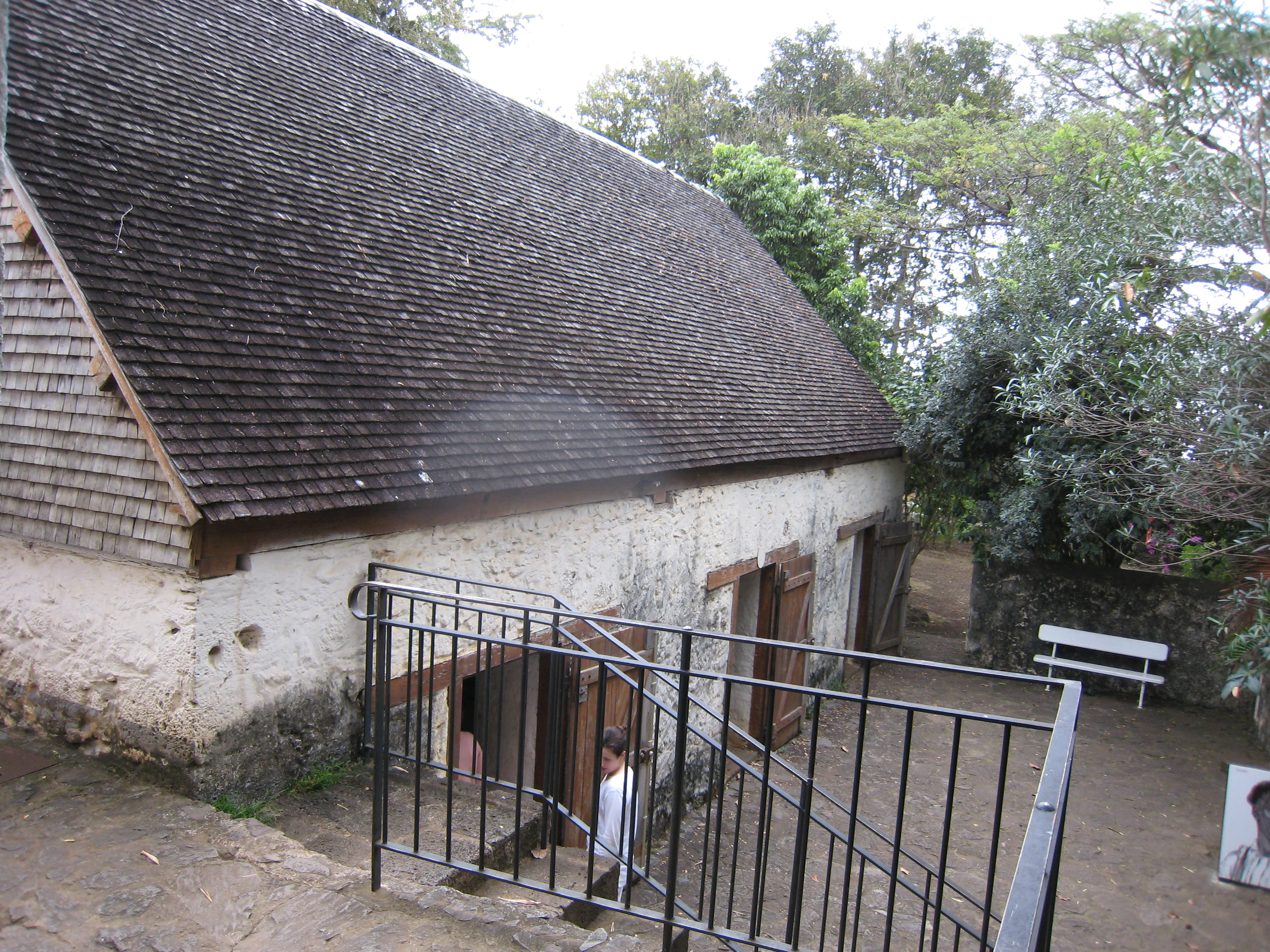
The Slave Hospital, an exhibition space and memorial

=== Sugar factory ===
Near the park, the ruins of the sugar mill—which operated from 1825 to 1920—recall the estate's original function.

In its day, the Villèle estate boasted the most modern sugar mill in the west, enabling it to produce and export sugar. In March 1831, the Réunion municipal council selected the estate to serve as a model sugar mill, based on economic criteria and its favorable location—situated in the heart of the western sugar-growing region with direct road access. The mill was transformed in 1832 by the engineer Joseph Martial Wetzell.

A century later, the 1932 cyclone partially destroyed it.

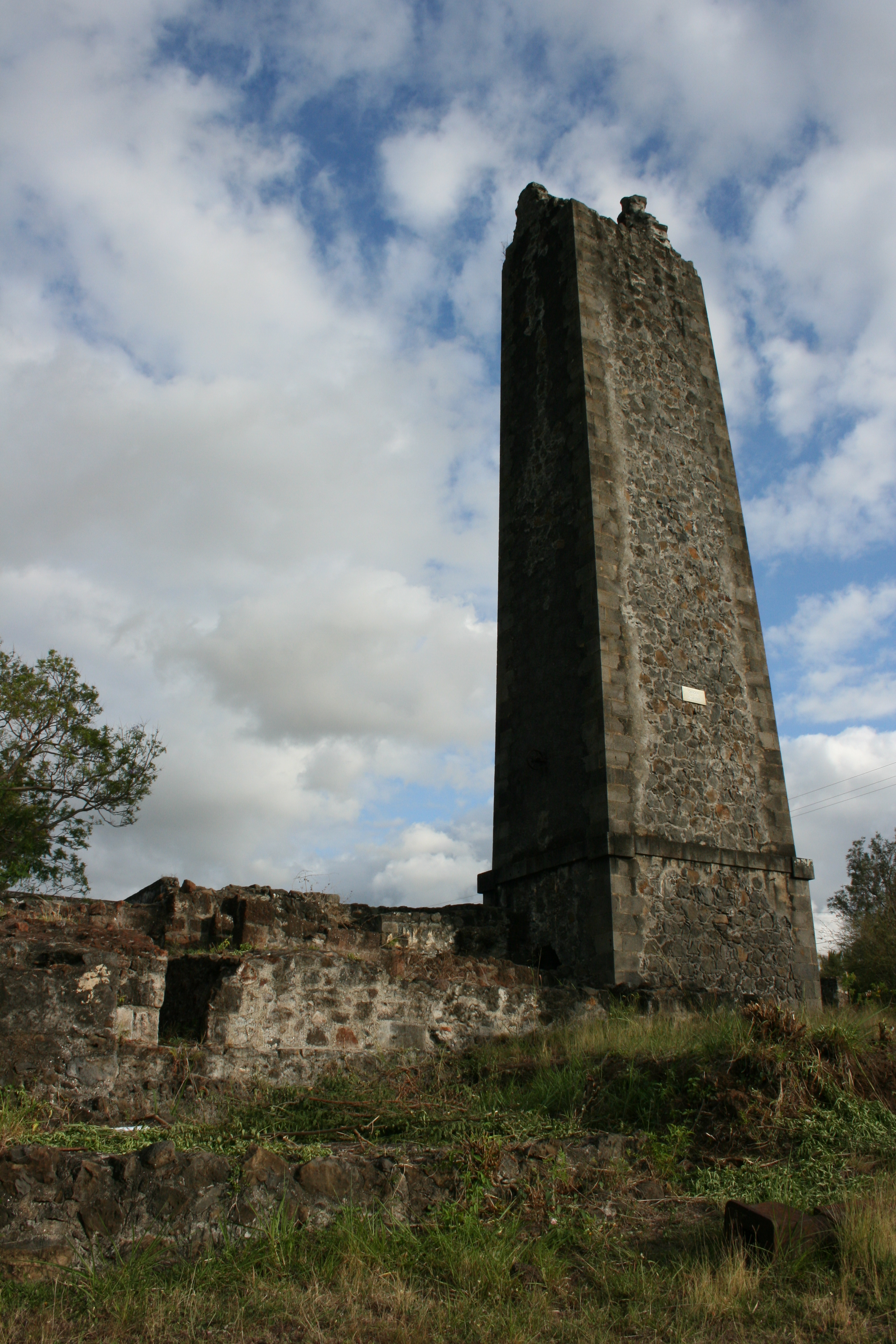
View of a ruined factory chimney on the Villèle estate

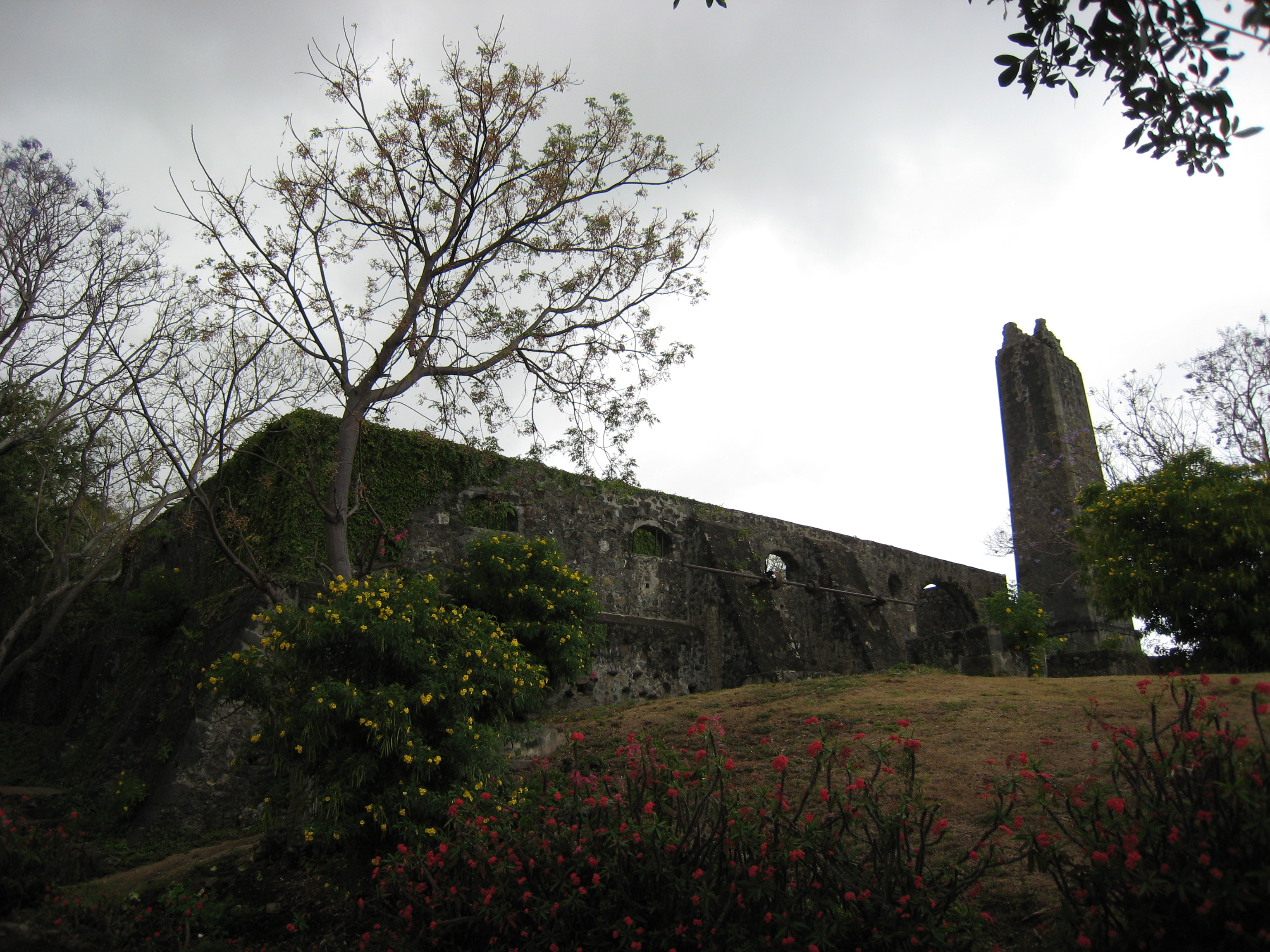
Ruins of the sugar factory

=== Pointed Chapel ===
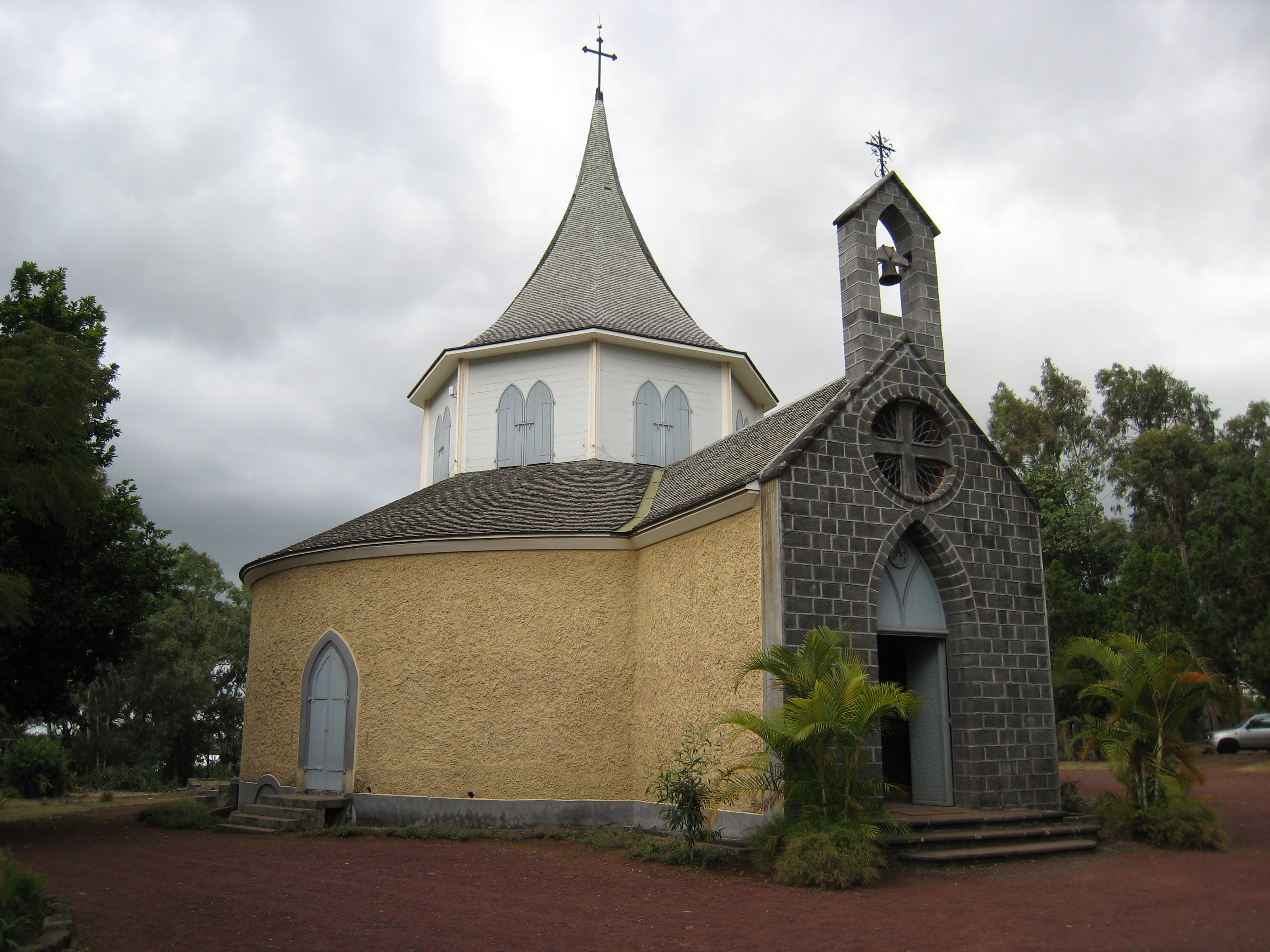
The Pointed Chapel

The "Chapelle Pointue" is also part of the estate, standing prominently on the eastern side. It was built between 1841 and 1843, prior to the death of Madame Desbassayns. Through a testamentary bequest, she established a foundation for the Saint-Gilles chapel "for the slaves and the poor inhabitants of the surrounding area." Her aim was to foster the evangelization of the slaves as a means of guarding against revolts.. It is dedicated to the Virgin and to Saint Ombeline, the patron saint of the woman who commissioned it.

Featuring a highly distinctive rotunda-shaped architectural design, it was designated a historical monument in 1970. Madame Desbassayns is buried there.

=== Garden ===
Two sculptures related to slavery have been installed in the estate's garden:

- Bann Marronér, created in bronze by Nathalie Maillot and Nelson Boyer. This work pays tribute to the maroons—escaped slaves. Indeed, the island's highlands are known as the lands where these fugitives sought refuge.
- A basalt sculpture of Madame Desbassayns reading the Code Noir of 1723, created in 2006 by Marco Ah-Kiem.
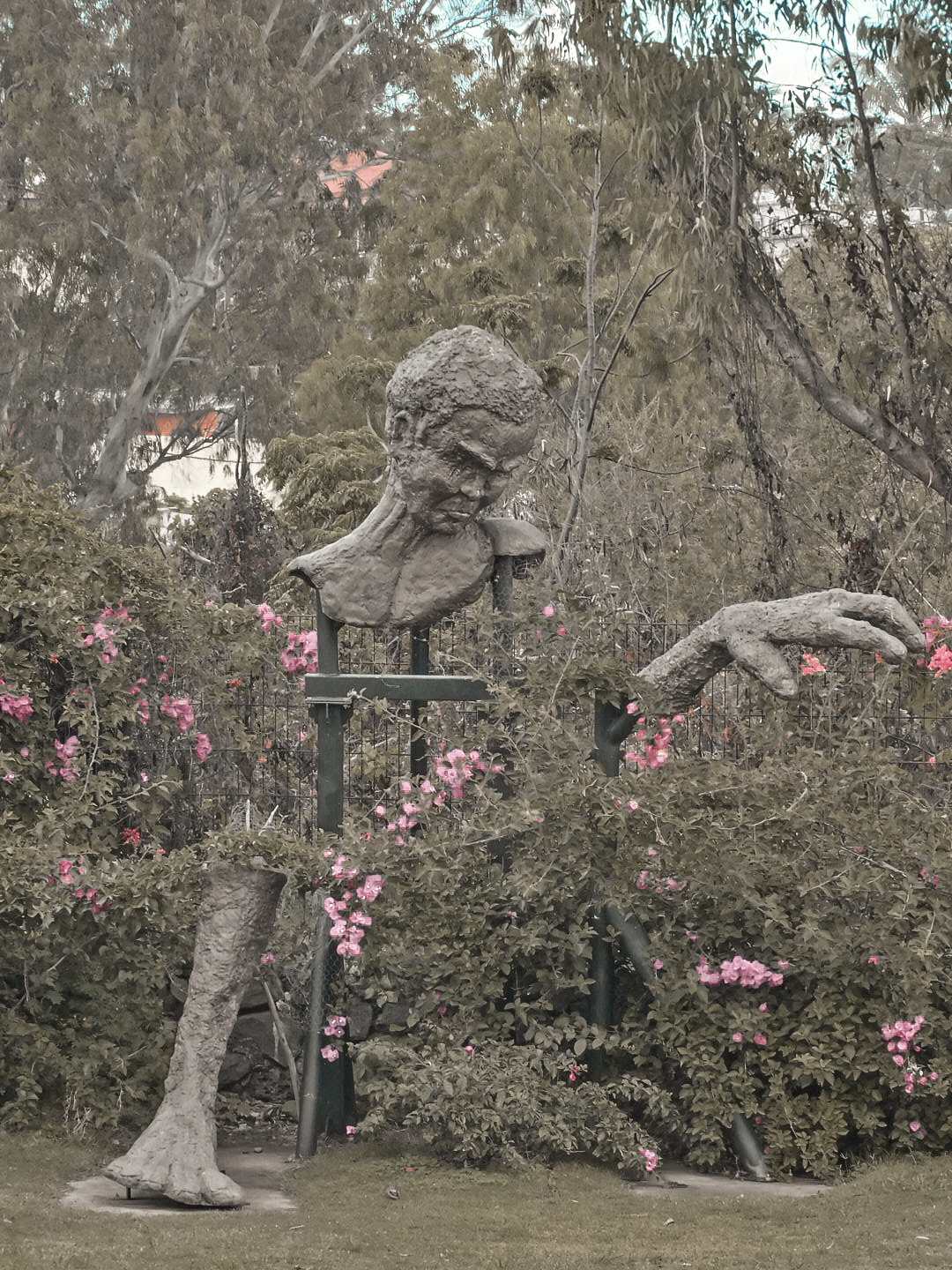
Bann marronér sculpture, paying tribute to slave resistance and escape

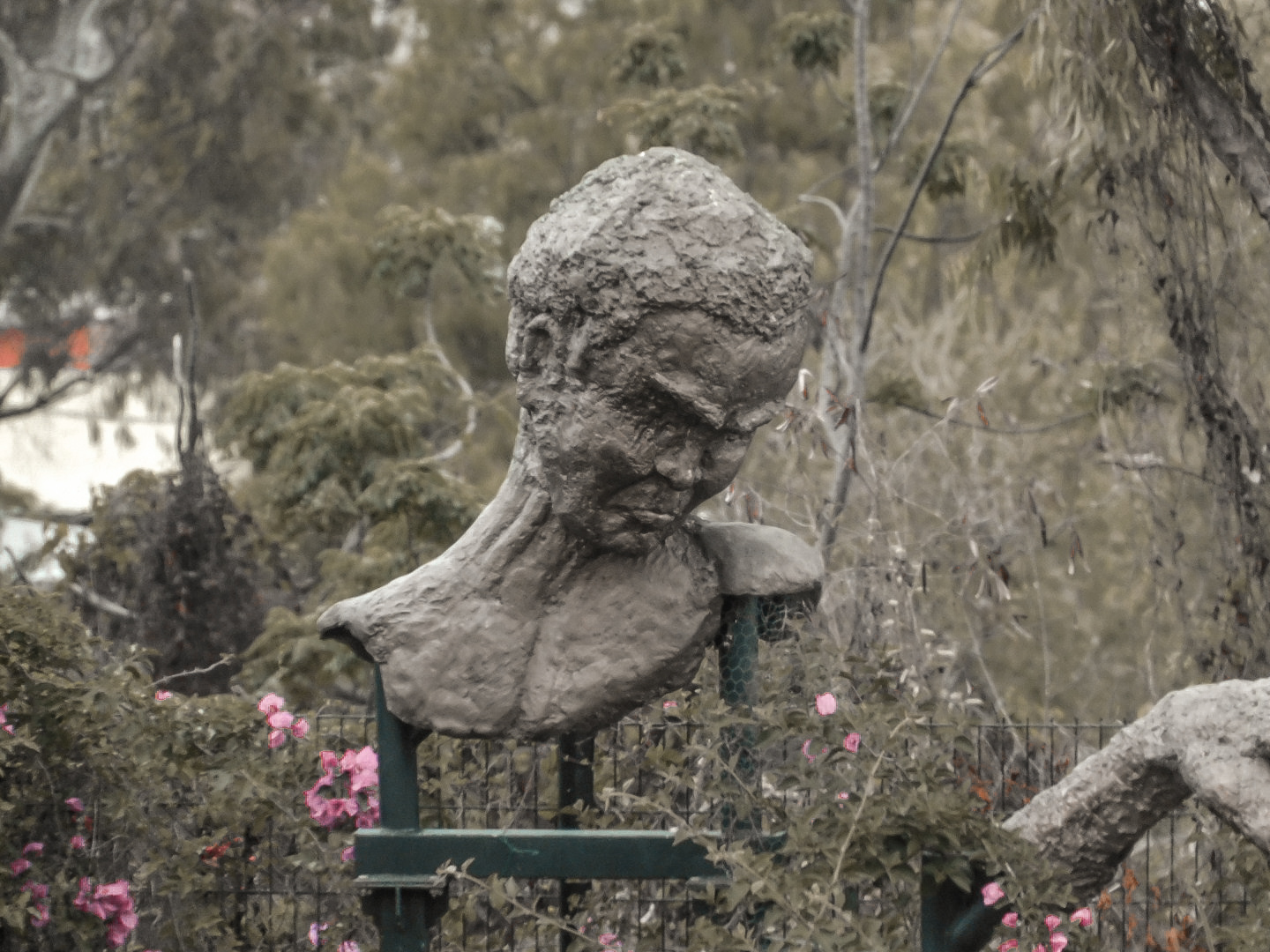

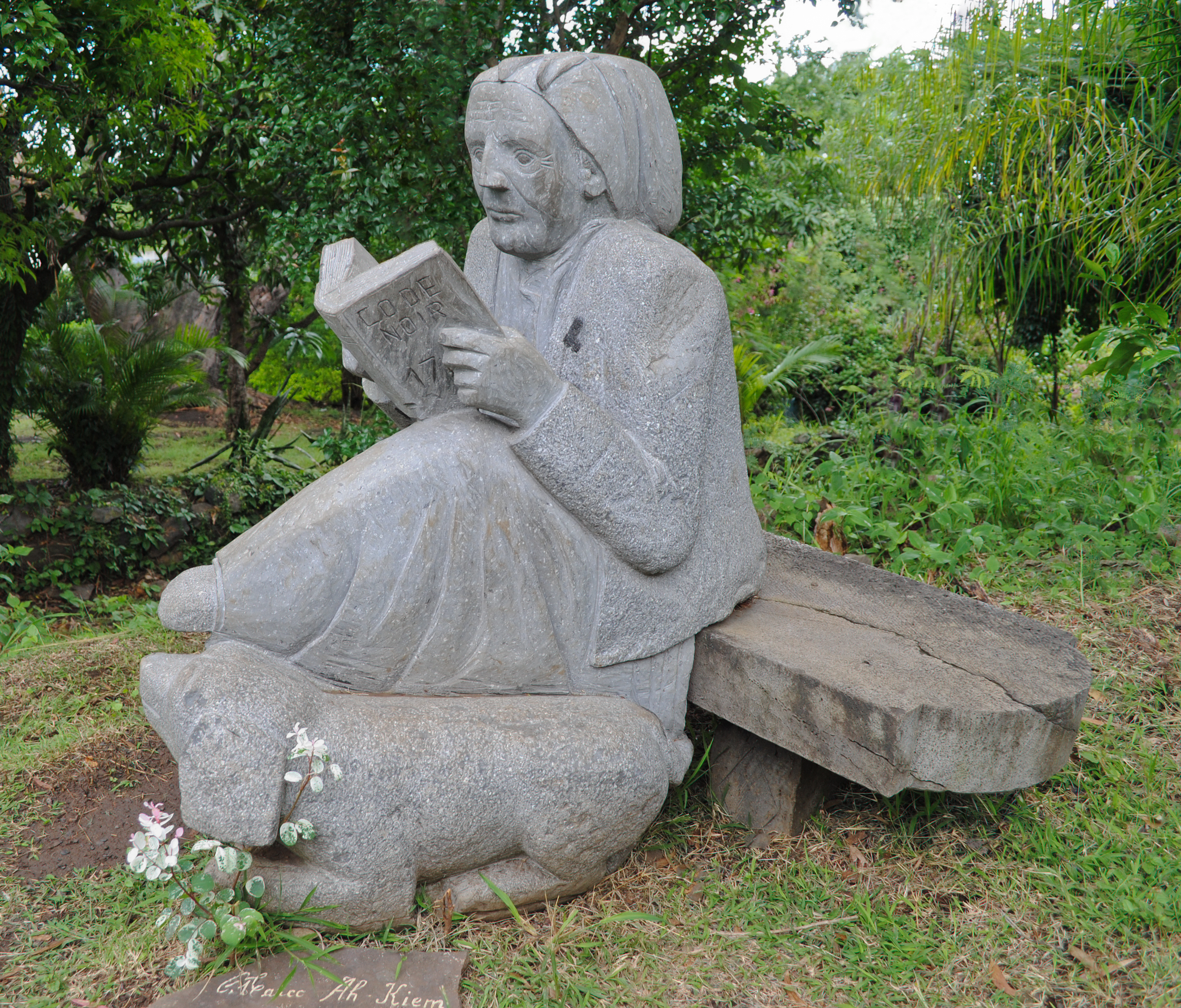
Sculpture of Madame Desbassayns reading the Code Noir of 1723

== Collections ==
The guided tour of the manor house showcases the lifestyle of major landowners who played a pivotal role in the history of Réunion during the 18th and 19th centuries; fine period furniture and decorative objects are displayed across seven rooms on the ground floor.

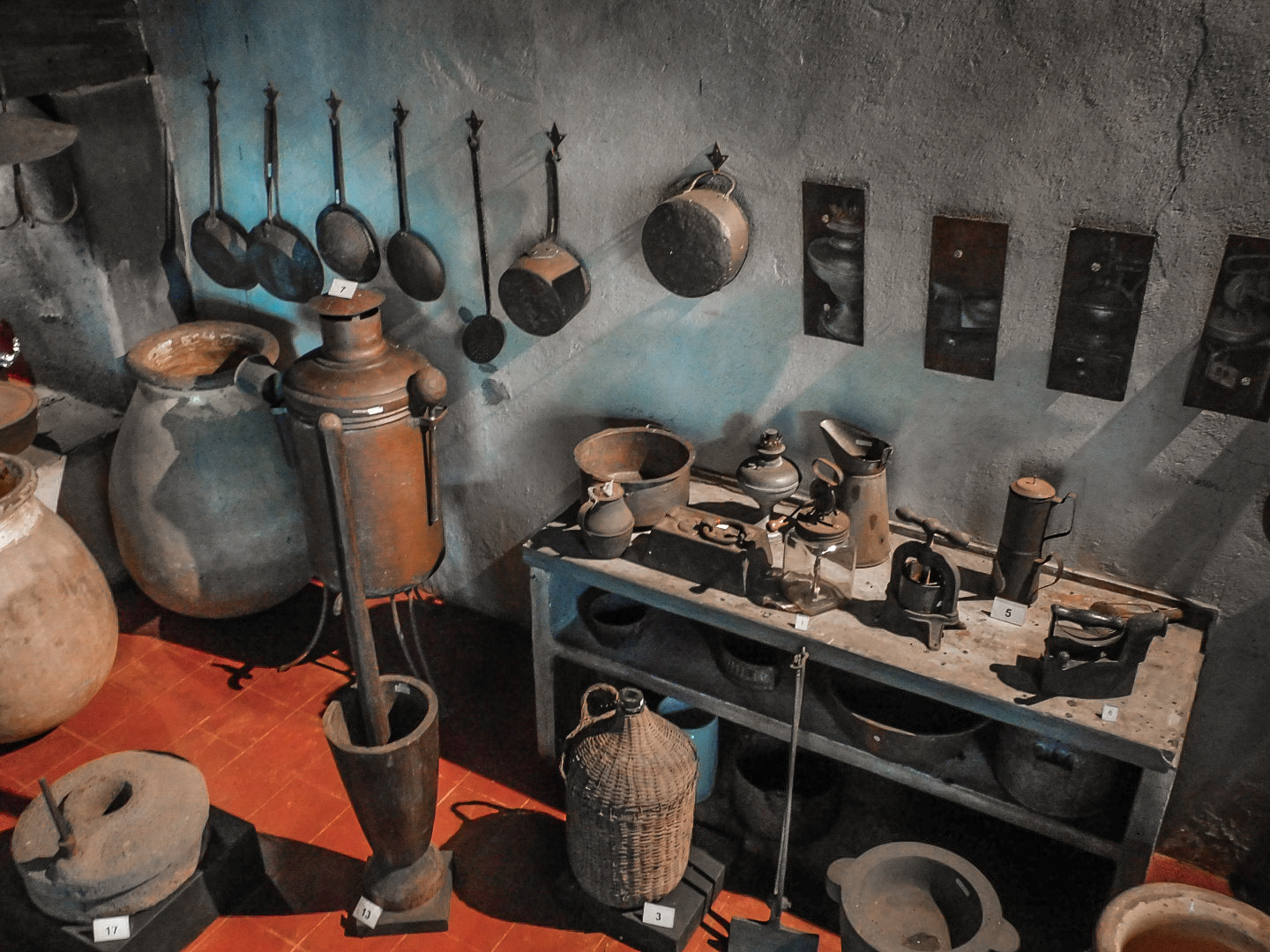
The former kitchen

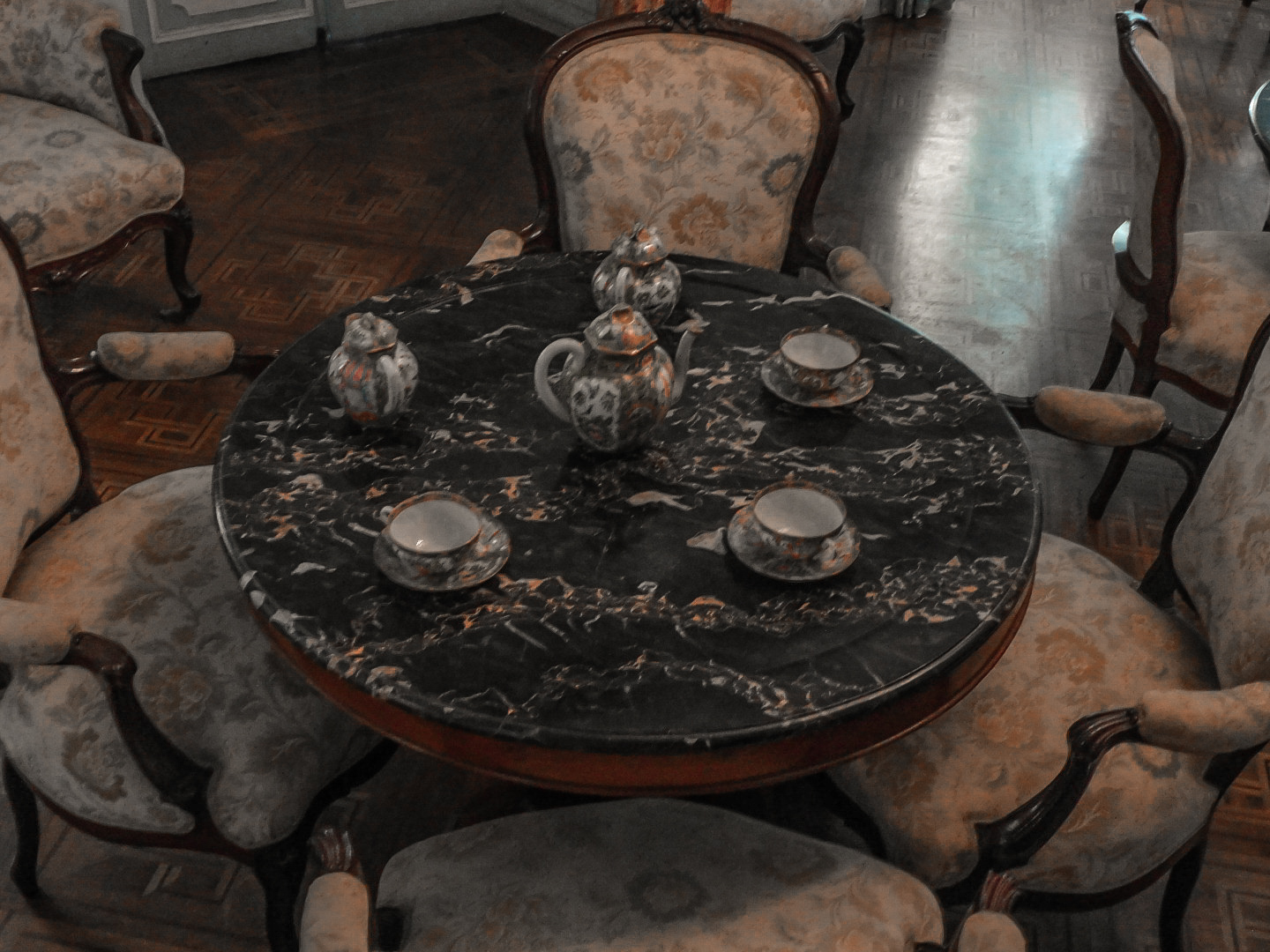
The drawing room where Madame Desbassayns received her guests

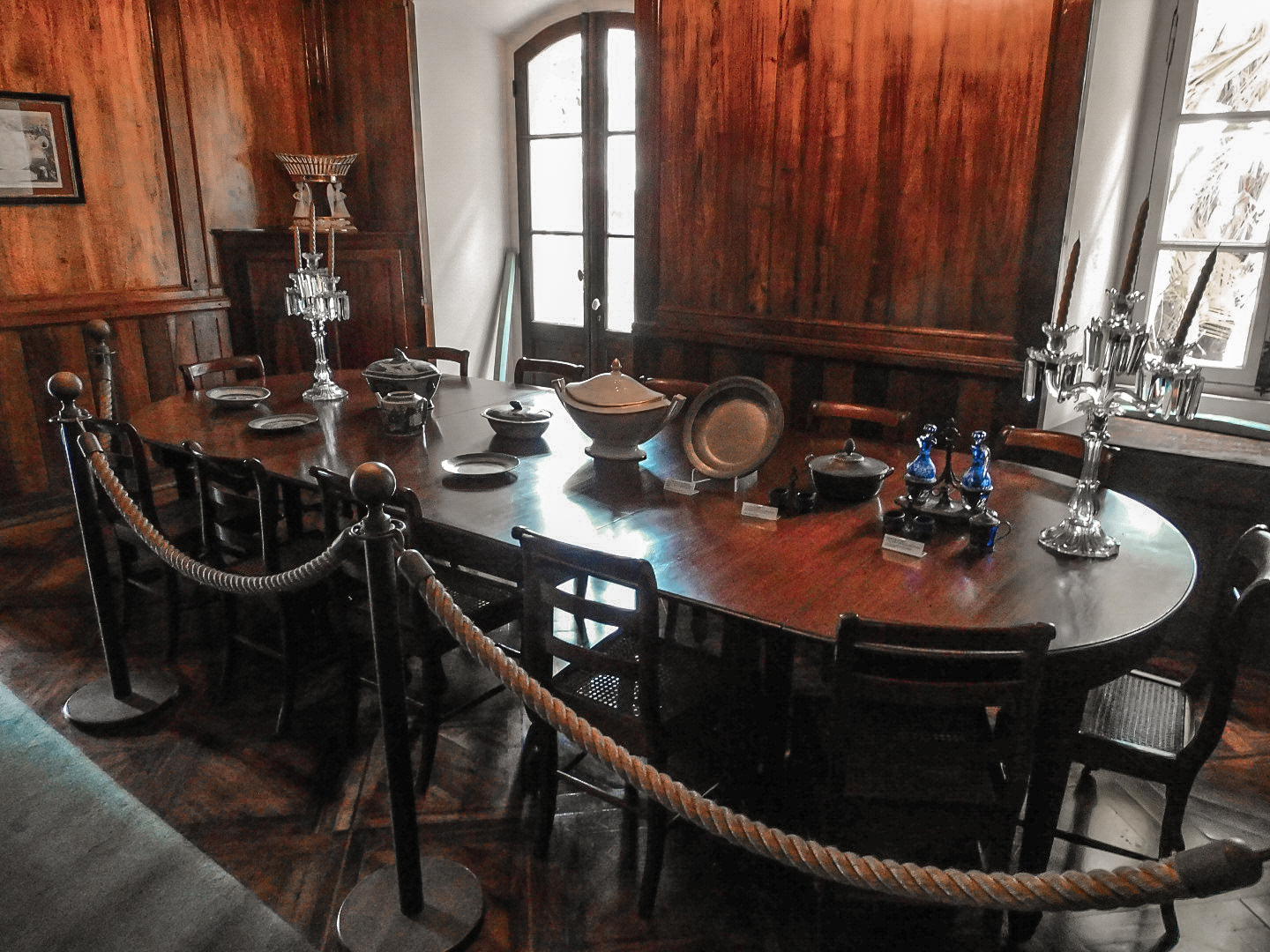
The dining room

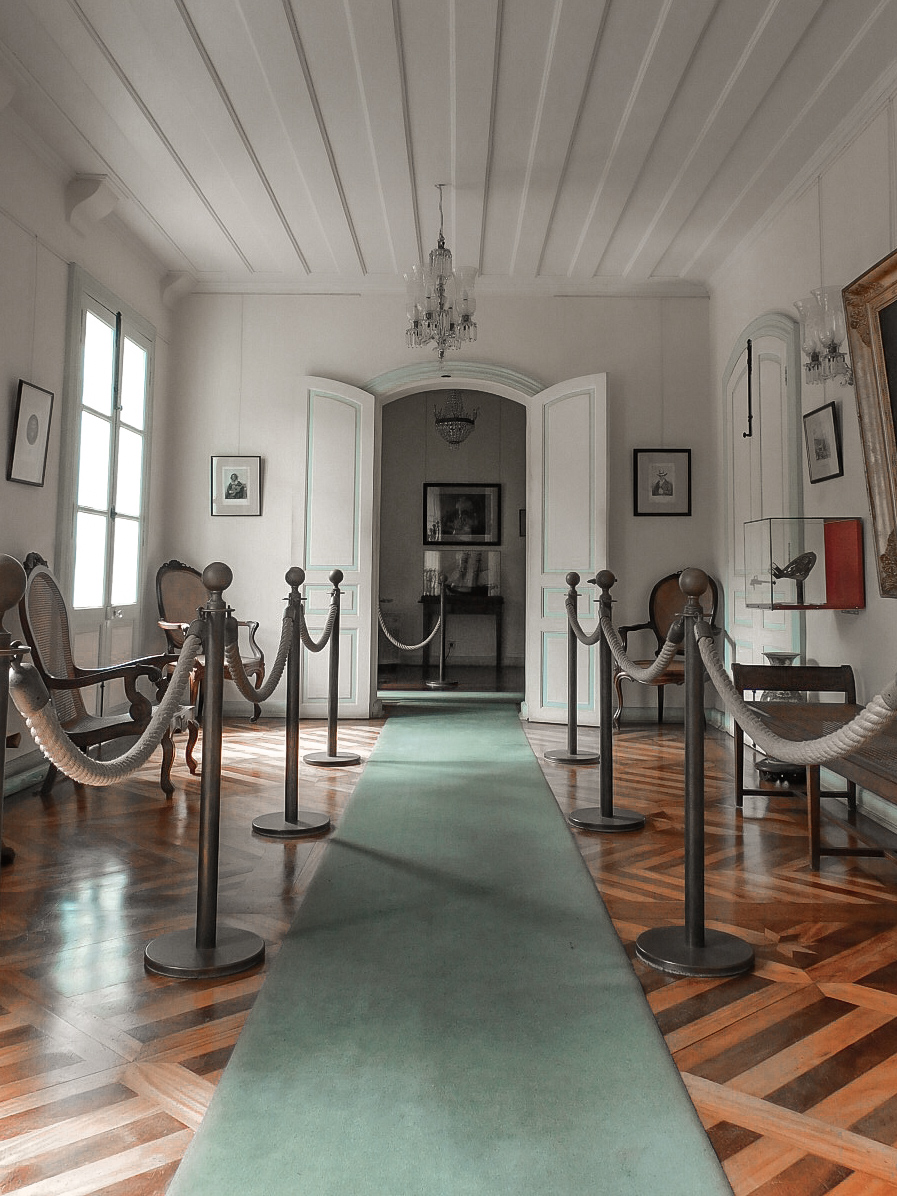
Rare wood flooring

Visitors can also discover objects evoking slavery.

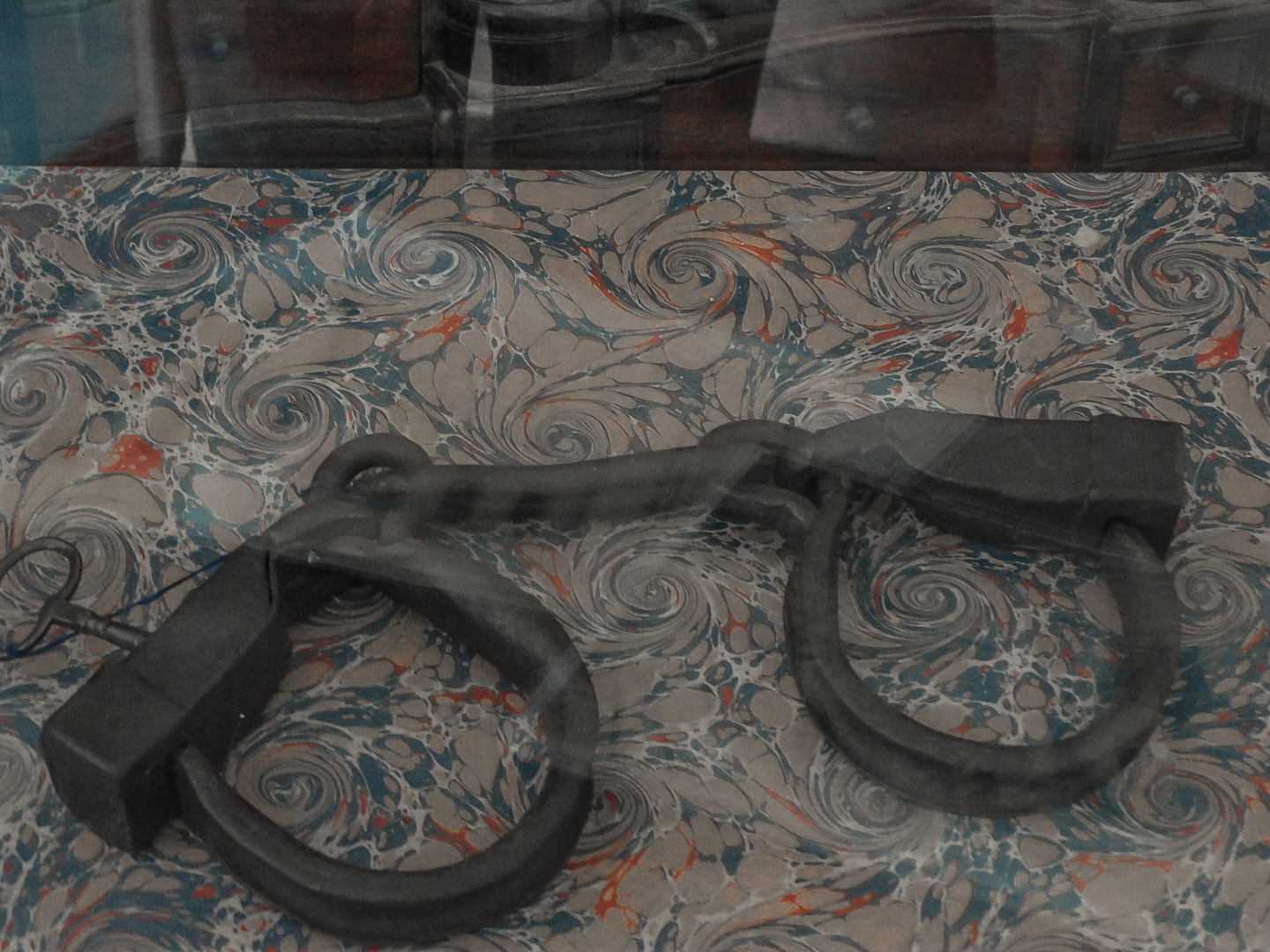
Slave shackles

Finally, much like the Léon-Dierx Museum in Saint-Denis, the institution collects objects related to Paul et Virginie—the novel by Jacques-Henri Bernardin de Saint-Pierre published in 1788. For instance, it holds the painting by Henri Frédéric Schopin titled Paul et Virginie dans la forêt, created in 1841.

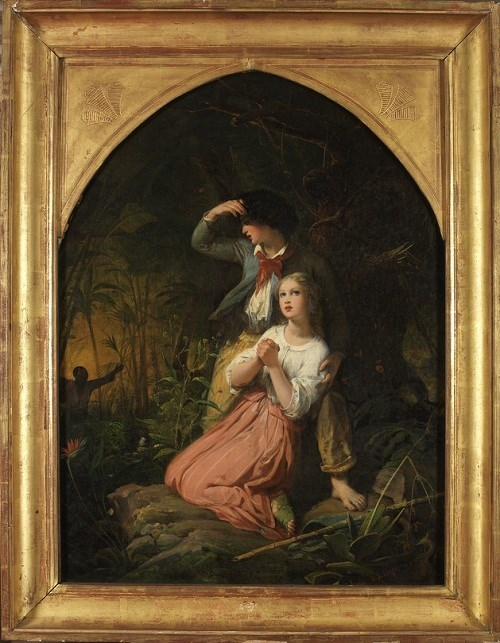
Paul et Virginie dans la forêt, by Henri Frédéric Schopin.

== See also ==
- List of museums in France
- Intercontinental Slavery Museum
