= Marcelle Maritz =

South African politician (died 2024)

Member of the Limpopo Provincial Legislature
- In office 22 May 2019 – 4 October 2024
- Succeeded by: André Moss

Personal details
- Born: Mokopane, South Africa
- Died: 4 October 2024 Mokopane, South Africa
- Resting place: Mokopane Cemetery
- Party: Freedom Front Plus (2015–2024)
- Other party: Democratic Alliance (before 2015)

Marcelle Frieda Maritz (27 August 1965 – 4 October 2024) was a South African politician who served as a Member of the Limpopo Provincial Legislature from 2019 until 2024. She was a member of the Freedom Front Plus (FF+) and the party's provincial leader. She served as a municipal councillor of the Mogalakwena Local Municipality prior to her appointment to provincial legislature. Maritz was a member of the Democratic Alliance (DA) until 2015, when she resigned from the party after allegations of racism. The DA soon laid criminal charges regarding racism against her in 2019.

== Political career ==
Maritz was a ward councillor of the Mogalakwena Local Municipality and a member of the DA until 2015, when the party accused her of racism. She denied these allegations, though the party's Provincial Disciplinary committee continued with their investigation of her breaching internal party rules. She resigned from the party in September 2015 amid the investigation taking place. She subsequently joined the FF+.

Her resignation as a party member of the DA caused her seat in the municipal council to become vacant. A municipal by-election was held in her ward on 18 November 2015, which Maritz contested as the FF+ candidate. The DA won the ward.

Maritz became a PR councillor in the Mogalakwena Local Municipality following the 2016 municipal election, as the FF+ had won one seat on the municipal council.

She soon became the provincial leader of the party and was the party's premier candidate for the 2019 general election. She was elected to the Limpopo Provincial Legislature and became the party's sole representative.

== Controversies ==
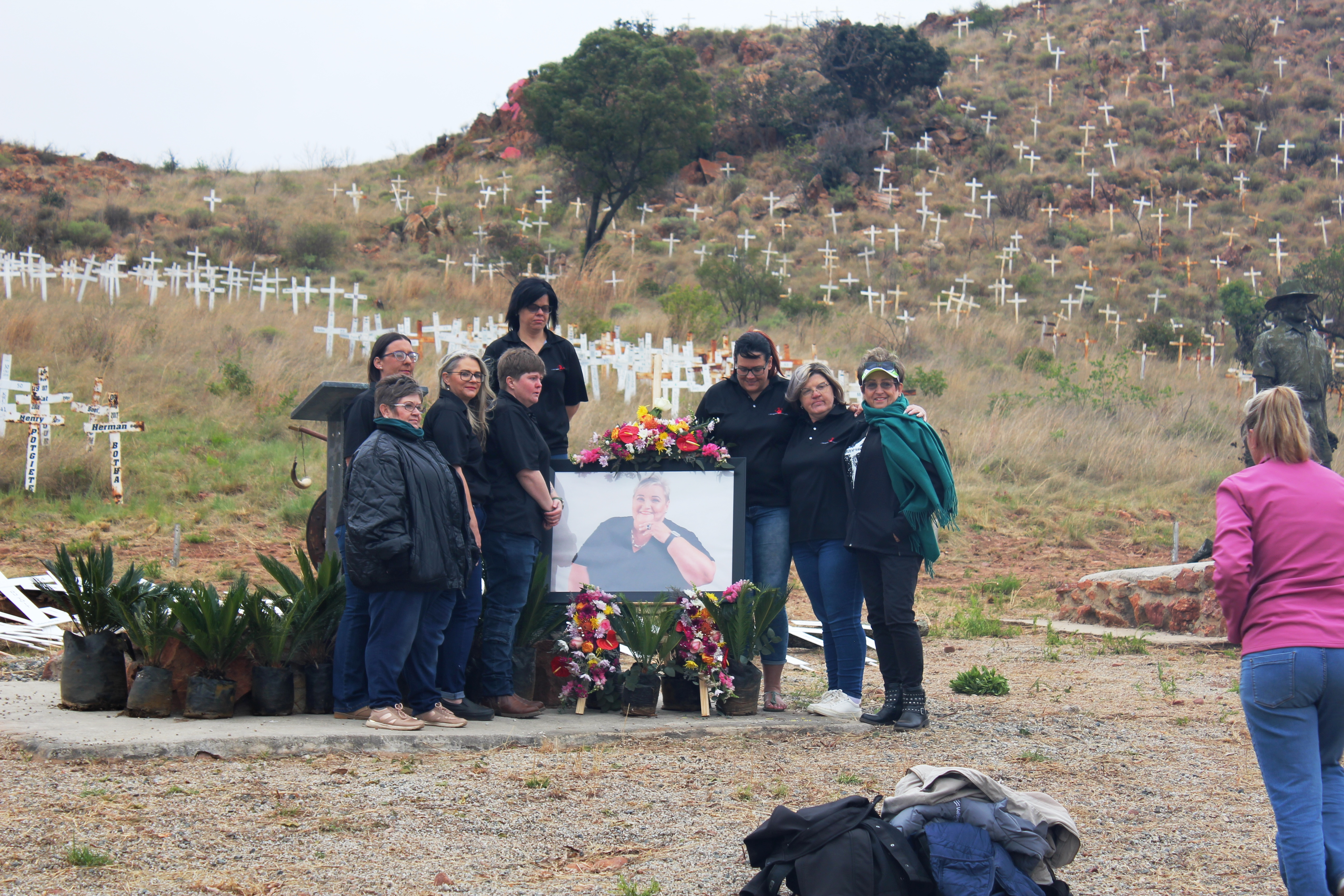
A tribute to Maritz at the Witkruis Monument, October 2025

On 25 September 2019, the DA announced that it would be laying criminal charges of racism against Maritz after a video surfaced in which she described the Afrikaans Protestant Church as a "church without kaffirs". The term is seen as a racial slur in South Africa directed to the black majority. The FF+ responded with a media statement disputing the authenticity of the video and said that the video is from 2015, when Maritz was still a DA member. The DA investigated a claim in 2015, that Maritz had used the word and consequently dismissed her. Maritz has denied both times that she used the word. The DA's Beyers Smit and Geoffrey Tshibvumo opened the criminal case on 26 September 2019. The DA claims that the leaked video was recorded in 2017, two years after Maritz had resigned from the DA and became a member of the FF+. The ANC referred her to the legislature's Ethics Committee. Maritz's lawyers have advised her not to discuss the issue publicly. Soon after on 3 October 2019, the South African Human Rights Commission announced that it had taken Maritz to the Equality Court over the incident.

== Death ==
Maritz died on 4 October 2024 at the age of 59. She was buried at the Mokopane Cemetery on 11 October 2024. André Moss replaced her as FF Plus provincial leader and in the provincial legislature. Upon her death Pieter Groenewald described her as someone who had much zeal for the farming community. She visited the scene of practically every farm murder or attack in Limpopo, where she assisted victims or their next of kin. Likewise she showed great compassion for those in hospital, and was much concerned with the suffering of animals.
