= Dumisani Sithole =

South African politician

Member of the National Assembly
- In office June 1999 – May 2009
- Constituency: Gauteng

Personal details
- Born: 18 January 1968 (age 58)
- Citizenship: South Africa
- Party: African National Congress

Dumisani Job Sithole (born 18 January 1968) is a South African politician and civil servant. He represented the African National Congress (ANC) in the National Assembly from 1999 to 2009, serving the Gauteng constituency. After that, he worked in the civil service as an employee of the City of Johannesburg and later as an employee of Parliament.

== National Assembly ==
Sithole was born on 18 January 1968. He was first elected to the National Assembly in the 1999 general election, and he gained re-election in 2004; during both terms, he represented the Gauteng constituency. By 2005, Sithole was the chairperson of Parliament's Committee on Foreign Affairs, and he led the 11-member delegation sent by the South African government to observe the 2005 Palestinian presidential election.

== Civil service ==
Sithole left Parliament after the 2009 general election and went on to work for the City of Johannesburg as the director of the Alexandra Renewal Project. He was dismissed from that position for insubordination. On 9 January 2017, he began a position in the administration of Parliament, where he was division manager for international relations and protocol.

While in this position, Sithole was subject to a disciplinary inquiry after he was named in the suicide note of a senior parliamentary manager, Lennox Garane. Garane was employed in the international relations division and shot himself in his office in Parliament in September 2018. His suicide note described his difficulties working under Sithole, whom he called "an unrepentant bully". An independent inquiry by the Public Service Commission validated some of Garane's grievances and recommended that disciplinary action should be taken against Garane and two other officials. Among other things, the commission found that Sithole had transferred Garane to a new unit "arbitrarily, unlawfully and irregularly" and against Garane's wishes, and it also found that Sithole had not responded with adequate empathy to Garane's suicide threats.

In October 2020, Amos Masondo of the Joint Standing Committee on the Financial Management of Parliament announced that Sithole had been found guilty on three disciplinary charges. He remained in his job, though he was served with a final written warning as sanction.
