= Kaffir (racial term) =

Ethnic slur used to refer to a black African person

Kaffir (/ˈkæfər/) is an exonym and ethnic slur directed at Black people in South Africa and, to a lesser extent, Namibia and Zimbabwe.

The word originates from the Arabic word kāfir ("unbeliever"), which was originally applied to non-Muslims of any ethnic background before becoming predominantly directed at pagan zanj (sub-Saharan Africans), who were increasingly used as slaves. During the Age of Exploration in early modern Europe, variants of the Latin term cafer (pl. cafri) were adopted in reference to non-Muslim Bantu peoples. During the Apartheid era, the slur was used, particularly in Afrikaans (Afrikaans: kaffer), to refer pejoratively to any black person, and has come to be closely associated with racism in South Africa.

The word had become a pejorative by the mid-20th century and is considered extremely offensive in post-apartheid South Africa. The use of the slur, euphemistically termed the "K-word" in South African English, has been found to constitute hate speech and crimen injuria in South African law.

== Etymology ==
The term has its etymological roots in the Arabic word kāfir (كافر), usually translated as "disbeliever" or "non-believer". The word was primarily used without racial connotation, although in some contexts it was particularly used for the pagan zanj along the Swahili coast who were an early focus of the Indian Ocean slave trade and Red Sea slave trade. Portuguese explorers who arrived on the East African coast in 1498 en route to India found it in common use by coastal Arabs, although the Muslim Swahili locals preferred to use washenzi ("uncivilised") for the pagan people of the interior. The poet Camões used the lusitanised plural form cafres in the fifth canto of his famous 1572 epic The Lusiads. Portuguese use passed the term to several non-Muslim areas including khapri in Sinhalese and kaappiri in Malayalam, which are used without offense in Western India and Sri Lanka to describe black African people. Variations of the word were used in English, Portuguese, Spanish, French, and Dutch (later Afrikaans) as a general term for several different ethnic groups in Southern Africa from the 17th century to the early 20th century. As English kaffir and Afrikaans kaffer, the term became a pejorative slur for Bantus and other black groups, including Cape Coloureds during the Apartheid era of South African history to the point that it is regarded as hate speech under current South African law.

== Historical usage ==
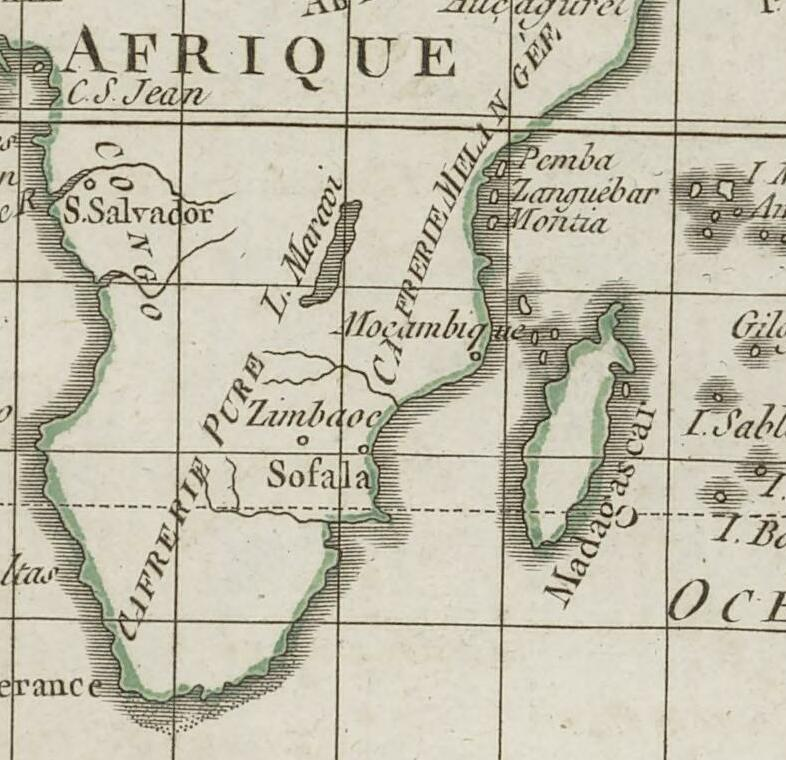
Detail of a 1795 French map distinguishing between "Pure-Blood Cafreria" (Cafrerie Pure) in Southern Africa and "Mixed-Blood Cafreria" (Cafrerie Melangée) inland from the Swahili Coast.

=== Early English ===
The 16th century explorer Leo Africanus described the Cafri as non-Islamic "negroes", and one of five principal population groups in Africa. According to him, they were "as blacke as pitch, and of a mightie stature, and (as some thinke) descended of the Jews; but now they are idolators." Leo Africanus identified the Cafri's geographical heartland as being located in remote southern Africa, an area which he designated as Cafraria.

Following Leo Africanus, the works of Richard Hakluyt designate this population as "Cafars and Gawars, that is, infidels or misbeleeuers". He uses a slight variation in spelling, referring to slaves ("slaues called Cafari") and certain inhabitants of Ethiopia, who, he says, ("vse to goe in small shippes, and trade with the Cafars"). The word is also used in allusion to a portion of the coast of Africa ("land of Cafraria"). On early European maps of the 16th and 17th centuries, Southern Africa northwest of the "Hottentots" (Khoikhoi) was likewise called Cafreria by cartographers.

=== Colonial period ===
The word was used, during the Dutch and British colonial periods until the early twentieth century, without derogatory connotations, to describe people who were not of a Christian or Islamic religious background. It appears in many historical accounts by anthropologists, missionaries and other observers, as well as in academic writings. For example, the Pitt Rivers Museum in Oxford originally labelled many African artifacts as "Kaffir" in origin. The 1911 Encyclopædia Britannica made frequent use of the term, to the extent of having an article with that title.

=== Apartheid-era South Africa ===
During the South African general election in 1948, those who supported the establishment of an apartheid regime campaigned under the openly racist slogan "Die kaffer op sy plek" ("The kaffir in his place").

During the early 1980s, Butana Almond Nofomela, an assassin who worked for the Security Branch, stabbed a white farmer, Johannes Lourens, to death in Brits, South Africa. Nofomela claimed that he had intended to rob Lourens, but when Lourens confronted him with a gun and called him a "kaffir," he became enraged and killed the farmer with his knife.

The Afrikaans term Kaffir-boetie (Kaffir brother) was often used to describe a white person who fraternised with or sympathised with the cause of the black community.

=== Namibia ===
As in South Africa, the term was used in Namibia as a general derogatory reference to black people. A 2003 report by the Namibian Labour Resource and Research Institute states:

Kaffir in the Namibian context was a derogatory term which mainly referred to blacks in general but more particularly to black workers as people who do not have any rights and who should also not expect any benefits except favours which bosses ('basse') could show at their own discretion.

== Modern usage ==
In 2000, the Parliament of South Africa enacted the Promotion of Equality and Prevention of Unfair Discrimination Act. The act's primary objectives, according to a press statement published by the Department of Justice and Constitutional Development on 27 November 2004, are as follows:

- To promote equality
- To prohibit and prevent unfair discrimination (either on the basis of age, race, sex, disability, language, religion, culture, etc.)
- To prevent hate speech (e.g. calling people names such as kaffir, koelies, hotnot, etc.)
- To prevent harassment

In February 2008, there was controversy in South Africa after Irvin Khoza, then chairperson of the 2010 FIFA World Cup organising committee, used the term during a press briefing in reference to a journalist.

A statement made during the 5 March 2008 sitting of the South African Parliament shows how the usage of the word is seen today:

We should take care not to use derogatory words that were used to demean black persons in this country. Words such as Kaffir, coolie, Boesman, hotnot and many others have negative connotations and remain offensive as they were used to degrade, undermine and strip South Africans of their humanity and dignity.

The phrase the K-word is now often used to avoid using the word itself, similar to the N-word, used to represent nigger.

In 2012, a woman was jailed overnight and fined after pleading guilty to crimen injuria for using the word as a racial slur at a gym.

In July 2014, the Supreme Court of Appeal upheld a 2012 conviction for offences of crimen injuria and assault relating to an argument about parking in which a man used the word. The judgement states:

The word kaffir is racially abusive and offensive and was used in its injurious sense ... in this country, its use is not only prohibited but is actionable as well. In our racist past it was used to hurt, humiliate, denigrate and dehumanise Africans. This obnoxious word caused untold sorrow and pain to the feelings and dignity of the African people of this country.

In March 2018, Vicki Momberg was convicted of racist language for using the term over 40 times in reference to two South African police officers.

In July 2024 the International Botanical Congress voted to change more than 300 scientific names of plants, algae, and fungi with kaffir-related names like caffer, caffra and caffrum, in favour of afer, afra and afrum respectively, For example, Erythrina caffra was changed to Erythrina afra.

== Examples ==
Certain indicative examples are listed below:

- Mahatma Gandhi: "The latest papers received from South Africa, unfortunately for the Natal Government, lend additional weight to my statement that the Indian is cruelly persecuted being in South Africa ... A picnic party of European children used Indian and Kaffir boys as targets and shot bullets into their faces, hurting several inoffensive children." – Letter to the editor of The Times of India, 17 October 1896.
- Winston Churchill, during the Boer War, wrote of his "irritation that Kaffirs should be allowed to fire on white men".
- John Philip Sousa's 1914 concert suite "Tales of a Traveler", composed after his band's tour to South Africa, contains a movement titled "The Kaffir on the Karoo".
- "Kaffir" is the title of a 1995 hit song by the black Johannesburg Kwaito artist Arthur Mafokate. The lyrics say, "don't call me a kaffir". This song is considered one of the first hits of the Kwaito genre, and is said to have set precedent for the post-apartheid generation struggle of combining dance music with the new phenomenon of freedom of expression in South Africa.
- Kaffir Boy is the title of Mark Mathabane's autobiography, who grew up in the township of Alexandra, travelled to the United States on a tennis scholarship, and became a successful author in his adoptive homeland.
- South African cricket players complained that they were racially abused by some spectators during a December 2005 Test match against host country Australia held in Perth. Makhaya Ntini, a black player in the team, was taunted with the word "kaffir". Other white players such as Shaun Pollock, Justin Kemp, and Garnett Kruger were subjected to shouts of kaffirboetie, an Afrikaans term which means "brother of a kaffir".
- Australian tennis player Brydan Klein was fined $16,000 following a qualifying match at the Eastbourne International, June 2009, for unsportsmanlike conduct after allegedly calling his South African Cape Coloured opponent, Raven Klaasen, a "kaffir".

== Other usages ==
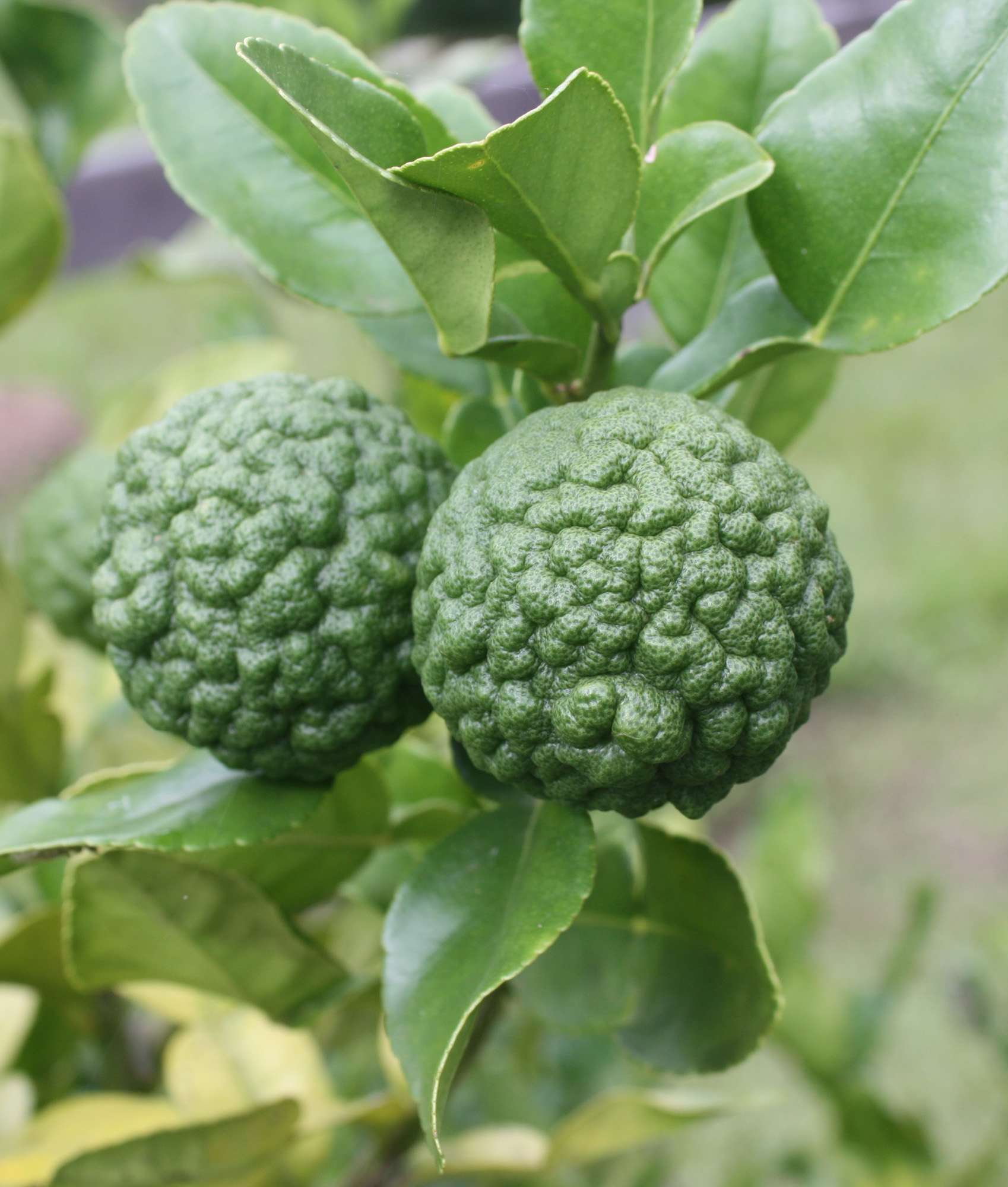
Kaffir lime

"Kaffir lime" is one of the names of a citrus fruit native to tropical countries in South and Southeast Asia. Its etymology is uncertain, but most likely was originally used by Muslims as a reference to the location in which the plant grew, which was in countries populated by non-Muslims (Hindus and Buddhists). Under this interpretation, the plant name shares an origin with the South African term, both ultimately derived from kafir. The fruit name as such never had any offensive connotations, but due to the present negative connotations of "Kaffir" The Oxford Companion to Food recommends that the alternative term "makrut lime" (derived from the Thai name of the plant มะกรูด makrut) be favoured when referring to this fruit.

== See also ==
- Abeed
- Blackfella
- CAFR
- Coloured
- Coolie
- Golliwog
- History of South Africa
- Kaffir lime
- Kafir
- Kafiristan
- Kaffraria
- Kaffrine
- Moors
- Nigger
- Sri Lankan Kaffirs
- Takfir
- List of ethnic slurs
