= Mark Mathabane =

South African author and educator (born 1960)

- Born: Johannes Mathabane; 18 October 1960 (age 65); Alexandra, Transvaal, South Africa
- Citizenship: United States
- Education: Dowling College
- Occupations: Author and lecturer
- Known for: Kaffir Boy
- Spouse: Gail Ernsberger
- Children: Bianca, Nathan, Stanley

Mark Mathabane (born Johannes Mathabane, 18 October 1960) is a South African author, lecturer, and a former collegiate tennis player and college professor.

== Early life in South Africa ==
Mathabane was born in Alexandra, South Africa, an area that is a part of Johannesburg, the capital of the province of Gauteng. He was born to a life of poverty in the apartheid political setting of South Africa. His father was Jackson Mathabane, a Venda labourer who had an income of $10 a month. Mathabane has also stated that his father struggled with alcohol and gambling, and was even abusive. Magdalene Mathabane was Mathabane's mother. She had been sold to Jackson Mathabane as a wife at the age of fifteen by her mother. Jackson and Magdalene Mathabane had seven children, of whom Mark Mathabane was the eldest.

=== Life in the ghetto ===
Mathabane and his family lived in a one-square-mile ghetto which was also home to more than 200,000 other individuals. These living conditions lacked the modern commodities of paved roads, electricity, and even sewer systems. Food was scarce in this ghetto, and the homes were nothing more than rough shacks. Mathabane never even had his first pair of shoes until he was fourteen years old. Mathabane's early life in apartheid South Africa was devastating. He has stated that "living in apartheid was like living in Hell." At the young age of six, Mathabane joined his first gang. Mathabane has stated that this lifestyle was horrific but that he did learn to cope in this environment. However, he has stated that it was the elements of this environment which suppressed his spirit with which he was not able to cope. This suppression of his spirit even drove Mathabane to the brink of suicide at the age of ten.

=== Mathabane's mother ===
Mathabane has credited his illiterate mother with encouraging him to excel in education and to escape the confinements of apartheid South Africa. He has repeatedly mentioned her ability to always display love and encouragement even in her troublesome lifestyle. Mathabane's mother took a job to send him to school when he was seven. Many problems ensued from this endeavour since his father did not support the idea of obtaining an education.

=== First steps to escape from apartheid ===
Mathabane's grandmother worked as a gardener, and he attributes some of the first steps in his eventual escape from apartheid South Africa to an instance when he went to work with his grandmother. The family that his grandmother worked for gave him his first English book, which was Treasure Island. From this book, Mathabane began to dream of escaping the apartheid lifestyle. Additionally, the family gave him his first tennis racket, which he used to train himself tennis. Tennis would later become a key element in his eventual escape from apartheid South Africa.

=== Change of name ===
Mathabane randomly began to identify as Mark instead of Johannes when he first began playing tennis at Ellis Park and was introduced to his first white friend.

== Life in America ==
=== Tennis and move to America ===
1972 Wimbledon tennis star Stan Smith and his wife, Marjory Gengler, were a key element in helping Mathabane obtain a tennis scholarship to the United States. Mathabane met Smith in 1977 at the South African Championship tennis tournament in Johannesburg. In 1978, with the aid of Smith, Mathabane moved to the United States and started attending Limestone College in South Carolina.

- [Abe 'Scara' Thomas] - Was like a father to Mark. He introduced him to tennis, gave him his first tennis racquet and mentored/coached him until he got the scholarship to the USA. He introduced Mark to different people who were prominent in the tennis circle. My dad is the "freckled faced colored man" referred to in the book. Abe Thomas loved Marvel comic books and collected them.

=== College life ===
Mathabane was faced with a whole new world in America. Even though he had escaped apartheid from South Africa, racial discrimination and prejudice still existed in America. Mathabane attended Limestone College in 1978 and then moved to Saint Louis University in 1979. Following that, Mathabane attended Quincy College in 1981 and then moved to Dowling College.

While attending Dowling College Mathabane became the first Black editor of the school magazine. He graduated Dowling College cum laude with a degree in economics in 1983. Mathabane also pursued graduate level studies at Poynter Institute and the Columbia Graduate School of Journalism.

Later on in his life, Mathabane received an honorary doctorate from Wittenberg University.

=== Early success ===
Mathabane wrote his autobiography, Kaffir Boy, in 1986. Kaffir Boy illustrated his prior life in apartheid South Africa, and became a national best-seller. After reading Kaffir Boy, Oprah Winfrey invited Mathabane to appear on her show. Mathabane went on to write several other literary works (see #Literary works).

=== Recent life ===
Mathabane had his first visit to the White House in 1993 after being invited by President Bill Clinton, who had read Kaffir Boy. From 1992 to 1993, Mathabane served as a White House Fellow under US President Bill Clinton, and assisted him with his educational policies. Mathabane has written articles for some print sources. He has also been a guest on several different TV and radio shows, and is also a well-known speaker. Mathabane and his wife, Gail (née Ernsberger), their three children (Bianca, b. 1989, Nathan b. 1991 and Stanley b. 1994), and his extended family lived in North Carolina. They relocated to Portland, Oregon in 2004, where he was formerly director of multicultural education at Catlin Gabel School.

== Magdalene Scholarship Fund ==
In 2000, Mathabane established a non-profit organisation which he named after his mother Magdalene. As stated on Mathabane's website, the fund's mission is to "create hope in an impoverished, bleak part of the world by providing scholarships, books, uniforms and school supplies for needy children attending Bovet Primary School in Alexandra Township, South Africa."

== Literary works ==
=== Kaffir Boy: The True Story of a Black Youth's Coming of Age in Apartheid South Africa ===
Mathabane's first book was Kaffir Boy: the True Story of a Black Youth's Coming of Age in Apartheid South Africa, which was published in 1986, is an autobiography of his early life in apartheid South Africa. This book was listed as number one on the Washington Post's best-sellers list, and as number three on the New York Times best-seller list. Kaffir Boy has also won a Christopher Award, has been translated into several different languages, and is also used in many American classrooms.

=== Kaffir Boy in America: An Encounter with Apartheid ===
Mathabane's second book Kaffir Boy in America: An Encounter with Apartheid was also his second autobiography, and was published in 1989. Kaffir Boy in America picked up where Kaffir Boy had left off and followed Mathabane's early life in America.

=== Love in Black and White: The Triumph of Love over Prejudice and Taboo ===
In 1992, Mathabane coauthored his third book, Love in Black and White: The Triumph of Love over Prejudice and Taboo, with his wife Gail. Love in Black and White examined Mark and Gail's interracial relationship, and the obstacles that they faced.

=== African Women: Three Generations ===
African Women: Three Generations was Mathabane's fourth book, published in 1994. African Women tells the true story of the struggles of Mathabane's grandmother, mother, and sister in South Africa.

=== Ubuntu ===
In 1999, Mathabane wrote his first novel Ubuntu. Ubuntu is a fictional thriller of a human rights lawyer in post-apartheid South Africa.

=== Miriam's Song ===
Miriam's Song was published in 2000, and was nominated for the Alan Paton Award. Miriam's Song is a true account of the struggles of Mathabane's sister Miriam in apartheid South Africa.

=== The Proud Liberal ===
Mathabane's latest work of fiction, The Proud Liberal, was published in 2010. The Proud Liberal is a modern-day thriller, which deals with controversial issues such as terrorism, racism, and intolerance in America.

== Bibliography ==
- The Proud Liberal: A Novel
- Ubuntu: A Novel about South Africa's Truth and Reconciliation Commission
- Kaffir Boy: The True Story of a Black Youth's Coming of Age in Apartheid South Africa l Author Biography, Enotes
- The Lessons of Ubuntu: How an African Philosophy Can Inspire Racial Healing in America

== See also ==
- Alexandra
- Apartheid
- Ghetto
- Johannesburg
- Kaffir (ethnic slur)
