= Racism in South Africa =

Racism in South Africa can be traced back to the earliest historical accounts of interactions between African, Asian, and European peoples along the coast of Southern Africa. It has existed throughout several centuries of the history of South Africa, dating back to the Dutch colonisation of Southern Africa, which started in 1652. Before universal suffrage was achieved in 1994, White South Africans, especially Afrikaners during the period of Apartheid, enjoyed various legally or socially sanctioned privileges and rights that were denied to the indigenous African peoples and to the immigrants and descendants of immigrants who had not originated from Europe. Examples of systematic racism over the course of South Africa's history include forced removals, racial inequality, racial segregation, uneven resource distribution, and disenfranchisement. Racial controversies and politics remain major phenomena in the country.

== Colonial racism ==
The region that would become modern-day South Africa was located in a position of advantage for European merchants who were seeking to organize and carry out trade in the East Indies, primarily Portuguese and Dutch colonists. In 1652, the Dutch East India Company founded the Cape Colony at the Cape of Good Hope. The purpose of the colony was to ensure that Dutch ships sailing to and from Batavia would have a source of fresh provisions, as death by starvation claimed a large number of passengers. During the period of Dutch rule, Dutch settlers (eventually known as Boers) began to migrate to the colony, instituting settlements throughout the region.

The region attracted Dutch slave traders, who imported slaves for wheat farming and viticulture to serve the various Dutch settlements. Many slaves escaped their masters by fleeing inland and joining existing groups such as the Xhosa or forming groups that were headed by warlords such as those of the Bloem, Kok, and Barends families. By the late 18th century, Arabs and European merchants traded beads, brass, cloth, alcohol, and firearms in exchange for slaves, ivory, gold, wax, cattle, and skins. The profits from these trades encouraged the warlords to hunt elephants and slaves by raiding local communities such as Rolong, Tlhaping, Huruthshe, and Ngwaketse. During the Mfecane, the Zulu under Shaka overran many smaller tribes and enslaved them.

Many Indians were brought to the colony as slaves. The practice of importing slaves from India stretches back to the 1600s, when the Dutch bought non-Muslim slaves from various kingdoms of India that were ruled by Muslims. By the early part of the 18th century, 80% of the slaves were South Asians, who were not just from the Indian subcontinent but also those South Asians who were living in south-east Asian regions such as Java. A slave-trading station was established in Delagoa Bay (present-day Maputo) in 1721 but was abandoned in 1731. Between 1731 and 1765, many Madagascan slaves were bought from Madagascar.

The Dutch colonial law defined slaves as property that could be traded, bought, and sold, a form of slavery known as 'chattel slavery'. There are many examples of discriminatory practices toward slaves during the colonial period, such as whipping, starvation, being forced to work for long hours, laborers having to carry passes, being subject to high taxation, not being able to walk on the sidewalks, and being banned from living, entering, or working in certain areas, such as the Orange Free State. Other examples include the allocation of rations during the Siege of Ladysmith.

For Whites—Biscuit, 1/4 lb.; Maize meal, 3 oz.
For Indians and Kaffirs—Maize meal, 8 oz.
Europeans—Fresh meat, 1 lb.
Kaffirs—Fresh meat, 1-1/4 lbs. (Chiefly horseflesh.)
For White men—Coffee or tea, 1/12 oz.; pepper, 1/64 oz.; salt, 1/3 oz.; sugar, 1 oz.; mustard, 1/20 oz.; Vinegar, 1/12 gill.
For Indians—a little rice.

— H. W. Nevinson

The word "Kaffir" was used with apparently derogatory connotations during the period of European colonial rule until the early 20th century.

=== Non-racialism in the Cape Colony ===
From 1853, the Cape Colony had a representative democracy that granted suffrage to all men regardless of color; policies the emerged from the Representative government and Responsible government movements notably during the administration of Cape Prime Minister John Molteno. However, beginning in 1887, the Cape government of Prime Minister Gordon Sprigg began to change voting laws in order to impede black votes with the adoption of the Cape Parliamentary Registration Act. The erosion of non-White voting rights would continue during the government of Cecil Rhodes culminating in the Glen Grey Act of 1894 before the Union of South Africa was formed in 1910.

== Apartheid racism ==
Apartheid (Afrikaans pronunciation: [aˈpartɦɛit]; an Afrikaans word meaning "separateness", or "the state of being apart", literally "apart-hood") was a system of racial segregation in South Africa enforced through legislation by the National Party (NP), the governing party from 1948 to 1994. Under apartheid, the rights, associations, and movements of the majority black inhabitants and other ethnic groups were curtailed, and white minority rule was maintained. Apartheid was developed after World War II by the Afrikaner-dominated National Party and Broederbond organizations. The ideology was also enforced in South West Africa, which was administered by South Africa under a League of Nations mandate (revoked in 1966 via United Nations Resolution 2145) until it gained independence as Namibia in 1990. By extension, the term is currently used for forms of systematic segregation established by the state authority in a country against the social and civil rights of a certain group of citizens due to ethnic prejudices.

The Indian community has been subject to Zulu racist attacks dating back to the arrival of indentured labor in South Africa, which ultimately resulted in the Durban Riots, of 1949 followed by riots in 1985 where homes for 1500 Indians were set on fire.

=== Governmental racism under Apartheid ===
The first example of apartheid legislation was the Population Registration Act. This act was the first to force citizens to be registered under their race, and this set the stage for later racial tension. One example of apartheid legislation was the Promotion of Bantu Self-Government Act, which was passed into law in 1959. This law resulted in the forced relocation of black people, reserving much less land for the black citizens to live on, despite making up a large majority of the population. The way the South African government did this at the time was by reserving off pieces of land called Bantustans and forcing the black South Africans onto these pieces of land. The Bantustans were a series of ten distinct territories created in South Africa for different "ethnic groups." Black South Africans who relocated to these areas forfeited their status as South African citizens and were designated as permanent residents of the reserves. The expectation was that they would establish and operate their own governments. These regions were underdeveloped and received minimal economic support from the South African government. Residents of the Bantustans had to travel long distances to find work in industrial areas on the borders of their territories. Despite the South African government's efforts to keep the Bantustans viable, In the 1970s, four of these Bantustans gained independence and seceded from the South African government, which was the original purpose of their creation: to segregate black South Africans from the rest of the country.

Another example of restricting legislation in South Africa is the Natives (Abolition of Passes and Coordination of Documents) Act of 1952. This act forced black South African citizens to carry their passbooks with them at all times. If someone was found without their passbook, they could be arrested for no reason other than that. This caused immense anger within the black community, which would eventually spark the defiance campaign of 1952.

These apartheid laws sparked some resistance within the black South African community, and several oppositional groups were formed. One of these groups that emerged was the ANC (African National Congress), a group that eventually became involved in many resistance activities. One movement the ANC got involved in was a defiance campaign in the black suburb of Sharpeville. This eventually led to the Sharpeville massacre, where 69 black South Africans were killed and 180 more were injured. This event resulted in the apartheid protest that South Africa would see, and in that moment, the black South African community was horrified. In response, the following week was full of demonstrations, protests, and marches. Because of this, the South African government saw fit to declare a state of emergency and arrest thousands of people who had been protesting. Numbers had approached 10,000 by May, and many of these people were not released for months afterwards. Also in the fallout of the Sharpeville massacre, the South African government banned any organizations that were considered a threat to public safety or order. This included organizations such as the ANC and the PAC (another organization that was committed to activism for black South Africans through peaceful protesting).

Under apartheid, black women were affected to an extreme degree due to discriminatory racial and gender laws. There were not many opportunities for women to become political leaders, as many organizations allowed only male membership, so not many women got very involved with politics. There were several organizations that let women join or had entirely separate organizations for women to join, one of which was the ANCWL, or ANC Women's League. In a protest of the Natives (Abolition of Passes and Coordination of Documents) Act of 1952, as mentioned above, and several other pieces of legislation, many women participated in movements against the government for the first time in the form of the Defiance campaign. The defiance campaign was a movement organized in part by the ANC because of new apartheid legislation from the government. Women were not the only people to take part in this campaign, but the inclusion of women is noteworthy because this was the first campaign to see major participation from women. The movement itself involved thousands of black citizens doing nonviolent things that would normally be considered as civil disobedience, such as going into areas that only White people were allowed to go into or burning their pass books. The idea behind the movement was that if enough black people flooded the South African prison and judicial systems, it would force the government to reform the apartheid laws. Thousands of people were arrested in a matter of months, but the campaign did not accomplish its goal of achieving radical change. However, it did capture the attention of the global community and that of the United Nations. In time, the UN would launch an investigation into the apartheid policy.

In the 1980s, resistance to apartheid became extreme. The United Democratic Front was formed in order to try and unite people all over to join in the fight against government oppression. The leader of the front, Allan Boesak, called on organizations all over South Africa to help him. This included churches, civic associations, trade unions, student organizations, and sports bodies. The UDF became extremely popular among the black community and helped unite everyone who was fighting for equality, something that had not happened in the past. The government's response was to declare another national emergency, and again, South Africa saw thousands of arrests and hundreds of killings. However, by 1990, the burden of public violence was too much. The government began losing its iron grip on the country, and eventually the state president, F.W. de Klerk, decided that reform was absolutely necessary.

==== Healthcare ====
The government's provision of public healthcare was far more comprehensive in white areas, compromising the ability of black people to access such services, and a growing for-profit private healthcare sector among the white population further exacerbated this racial disparity. In 1987, white areas had one dentist per 2,000 residents, and black areas had one per 2,000,000. In 1990, white areas had one doctor per 900 residents, and black areas had one per 4,100.

Spending Per Capita in Rands by Race Group, 1985 and 1987
Race Group	1985	1987
Blacks	R115	R137
Coloureds	R245	R340
Indians	R249	R356
Whites	R451	R597

Benatar in The New England Journal of Medicine used three health outcome statistics to demonstrate the inequality in healthcare between white and black South Africans at the end of apartheid: In 1990, the mortality rate was 7.4 per 1000 live births among white people and 48.3 per 1000 among black people; infectious diseases accounted for 13 percent of all deaths among black people and only 2 percent among white people; and life expectancy at birth was 60 years and 67 years for black male infants and female infants, respectively, compared to 69 years and 76 years, respectively, for white infants.

== Post-Apartheid racism ==
Milton Shain, emeritus professor in the Department of Historical Studies at the University of Cape Town, noted that Indian, colored, and white minorities are increasingly scapegoated by the ANC "in an attempt to cement cracks among the majority (insiders) and paper over class divisions." In 2001 former South African president, Nelson Mandela, criticized growing racial intolerance by black South Africans in their attitudes towards South Africans from other racial groups. Whilst Afrobarometer research has indicated that perceptions of discrimination have increased significantly among citizens from minority race groups since 2011, especially among those who are of Indian background.

Some believe the African National Congress (ANC)'s legally mandated racial representation is racist legislation. In June 2021, Democratic Alliance (DA) politician Helen Zille courted controversy when she commented that "There are more racist laws today than there were under apartheid". Dr. Duncan Du Bois, a historian and political analyst, supported Helen Zille's assertion. He pointed out that, based on research by political analyst James Myburgh, the pro-Apartheid National Party government passed 59 pieces of race-based legislation over a period of seventy years, whereas the post-Apartheid government led by the ANC had passed 90 laws with racial representativity mandates over a smaller time period of 25 years. James Myburgh himself considered Helen Zille's comments "hyperbolic" but "not (far) wrong".

According to Myburgh, modern South Africa's nationalism is replacing another. He argues that because this "is a morally discomforting [idea] for outsiders", "as a result much Western analysis of South Africa [turns] a blind eye to the ... implementation of the ANC's historic racial nationalist agenda." The South African Institute for Race Relations also considers the ANC to be pursuing a black nationalist agenda and believes that this pursuit endangers not only ethnic minorities but also immigrants.

=== Racism against black Africans ===
In 2019, a University of Cape Town report by an independent commission looked into allegations that institutional practices were racist. The commission found "systematic suppression of Black excellence in recent years" at the university. Submissions to the commission from students, staff, and the public were "rife with stories of better qualified Black academics being passed over for employment and promotion in favour of White academics". The report concluded that racism exists at UCT, "abetted by poor management systems" that "discriminate on a racial basis". Black staff members still remain under-represented in the university's senior decision-making bodies. Ahmed Essop, an education specialist at the University of Johannesburg, co-authored a 2008 report for the country's education department that concluded that racism and sexism are pervasive in the nation's institutions.

A group of white men allegedly verbally abused and humiliated staff at a restaurant near Stellenbosch. In response to this, a black student claimed their response was that anyone who did not speak Afrikaans was an alien in the area. He said that "they were whistling at them like they were whistling at dogs. They even jumped over the counter, and they were patting them like they were dogs. After he decided to leave the restaurant, the three white men and four other young white men allegedly followed him outside and proceeded to hit him.

Thabang Mosiako, a black athlete, had his head smashed onto the pavement at a bus stop. The attack was allegedly performed by a group of white students, whom Moisiako said attacked him when he criticized their racist remarks to another man. The attack was allegedly racially motivated and caused Moisiako to be hospitalized due to his injuries.

A black gas station attendant was attacked in an apparent racially motivated attack that was caught on camera. The incident began when the petrol attendant asked two white men not to smoke next to the petrol pumps, then later asked them to move to another pump because the one they were using did not have the grade of petrol they needed. The men then began to retaliate with racial slurs, and the altercation soon escalated into a physical fight, which saw over four white men attacking the gasoline attendant before his colleagues and eventually police intervened.

Mr. Nathan Maluleke, a sixty-year-old golf instructor, was brutally attacked with a golf club in 2013, and this vicious assault left him with head injuries and fighting for his life in the hospital. The incident started over racial abuse and escalated into an attack. Mr. Maluleke had noticed a group that was making a lot of noise and using vulgar language, including the term Kaffir, repeatedly. He put his golf bag in the boot of his car, approached the woman walking behind two young men in the group, apparently the woman using the language, to ask her to tone it down as the language being used was not good for the integrity of the place and was generally offensive, and as he was speaking to the woman, one of the two men, Matthew van der Walt, turned back and started attacking Maluleke. He ended up on the ground bleeding after being hit over the head with a golf club, and van der Walt admitted to having continued hitting him and punching him while on the ground as he showed off his hands to other people.

A 38-year-old man, Ron Rambebu, was attacked and called the slur Kaffir at a petrol station while he was sitting in his car on Kingfisher Road in Horizon Park, Roodepoort, on the West Rand. In the video, the father of three is seen being approached by the attacker. It does not seem like any words are exchanged before the attacker punches Rambebu multiple times through the vehicle's window. Rambebu does not appear to be retaliating during the attack, but he attempts to drive off before parking his vehicle and chasing his attacker with a spanner. His attacker is then seen boarding a white Ford Mustang and driving off with his associate.

Samora Mangesi, a South African entertainment news broadcaster and presenter, came across a car accident. Mangesi inquired after the status of the passengers, to which inquiry he and his passengers were called "monkey" and "black bitches". A heated argument ensued, and an unidentified person stole up behind Mangesi and hit him on the head with an unknown object, sending him to the hospital.

The South African Human Rights Commission found a public school guilty of hate speech toward black and mixed-race pupils. After an 18-month investigation, staff and the head teacher were found to have exposed pupils to dehumanizing and racist treatment. The Free State Department of Education, responsible for the school, says it will study the report and conduct its own investigation before taking any potential disciplinary action.

In 2008, Johan Nel, a white man, armed himself with a rifle and proceeded to go to the community of Skierlik, in the North West, and then went on a killing spree. On a Monday afternoon, while most Skierlik inhabitants were at work, Johan, dressed in camouflage fatigues, walked down a dirt road in an informal settlement and randomly started shooting at people with a hunting rifle while shouting racist invective. He killed three people, severely injured another 11 people, and disappeared onto a nearby farm.

==== Penny Sparrow ====
In January 2016, Penny Sparrow, a white woman who lived in the coastal city of Durban, compared littering black beachgoers to monkeys. She consequently apologized for her remarks but defended them as being taken out of context. She faced various legal consequences: the Equality Court considered Sparrow's words to be hate speech in terms of Section 10 of the Promotion of Equality and Prevention of Unfair Discrimination Act and fined her R150 000; and in the magistrate's court, she was found guilty of crimen injuria and fined R5000.

Professor ME Marais of the University of the Free State considers the case of crimen injuria against Sparrow to be unconstitutional since her comments targeted a group and not an individual; crimen injuria presupposes that the target is an individual.

==== Coffin case ====
Two white men, Willem Oosthuizen and Theo Jackson, were put behind bars in 2016 for a racially motivated assault on a black man after they alleged he had trespassed. In 2019, their sentences and convictions were adjusted, finding the pair guilty of assault with intent to do grievous bodily harm and kidnapping. Jackson was also sentenced for defeating the ends of justice by burning evidence.

==== Vicki Momberg ====
Vicki Momberg, a white woman, was sentenced to three years in prison and one suspended on four counts of crimen injuria for racist remarks she made to a black police officer in Johannesburg. She was the victim of a smash-and-grab incident, and a black police officer approached her to assist her. She responded by verbally abusing him, making racial remarks about the "low caliber of black people in Johannesburg," and using the slur Kaffir 48 times, which was recorded on video. She received a two-year prison sentence and an additional, suspended one-year prison sentence.

=== Racism against White Africans ===
The FW de Klerk Foundation reported that there are social media posts inciting extreme violence and racism against white South Africans, and these posts come mostly from black South Africans. It appealed to the South African Human Rights Commission to intervene on the issue of racism and hate speech against white South Africans. Its complaint to the commission detailed "45 social media postings that incite extreme violence against White South Africans." The foundation also said "an analysis of Facebook and Twitter messages shows that by far the most virulent and dangerous racism – expressed in the most extreme and violent language – has come from disaffected Black South Africans. The messages are replete with threats to kill all whites – including children; to rape white women or to expel all whites from South Africa."

==== Anti-White speech ====
A Gauteng government official, Velaphi Khumalo, stated on Facebook "White people in South Africa deserve to be hacked and killed like Jews. [You] have the same venom. Look at Palestine. [You] must be [burnt] alive and skinned and your [offspring] used as garden fertiliser". A complaint was lodged at the Human Rights Commission, and a charge of crimen injuria was laid at the Equality Court. In October 2018, he was found guilty of hate speech by the court, for which he was ordered to issue an apology.

In March 2018, a screenshot depicting EFF Ekurhuleni leader Mampuru Mampuru calling for racial violence on Facebook began to circulate on social media. The post read, "We need to unite as black People, there are less than 5 million whites in South Africa vs 45 million of us. We can kill all this white within two weeks. We have the army and the police. If those who are killing farmers can do it what are you waiting for. Shoot the boer, kill the farmer." [sic]. Mampuru claims the screenshot was fabricated in an attempt to discredit the EFF, further adding that "Without white people in the country‚ we are not going to have a Rainbow Nation."

After 76-year-old white professor Cobus Naude was murdered in 2018, black senior SANDF officer Major M.V. Mohlala posted a comment on Facebook in reaction to Naude's murder, stating "It is your turn now, white people… [he] should have had his eyes and tongue cut out so that the faces of his attackers would be the last thing he sees". Mohlala received a warning of potential future disciplinary action by the SANDF.

A photograph emerged of a University of Cape Town student who wore a shirt that read "Kill All Whites" in a residence dining hall during early 2016. The university later identified the wearer as Slovo Magida and reported the matter to SAPS and HRC. During a parliamentary debate on racism, Pieter Mulder of the FF+ read out the contents of the shirt, to which some MPs shouted "Yes! Yes!". As of 2018, no further action against Magida has been taken.

During April 2018, a Judicial Services Commission tribunal found that 'drunk judge' Nkola Motala's racist comments could justify his removal as a judge. Motala crashed into a wall while driving under the influence of alcohol in 2007. After the accident, Motala swore at a white onlooker, Richard Baird, and referred to him as a 'boer'.

Julius Malema, leader of the third-largest party, Economic Freedom Fighters, stated at a political rally in 2016 that "we [the EFF] are not calling for the slaughter of white people‚ at least for now". When asked for comment by a news agency, the ANC spokesperson, Zizi Kodwa, stated that there would be no comment from the ANC, as "[h]e [Malema] was addressing his own party supporters." This received backlash from many South Africans of all races. At another political rally in 2018, he stated, "Go after a white Man... We are cutting the throat of whiteness." This was in reference to the removal of Athol Trollip, a white mayor, from office in Port Elizabeth. The opposition Democratic Alliance has accused the EFF leader of racism.

In December 2018, in response to comments made by Johann Rupert in support of the South African taxi industry, Mngxitama asserted at a BLF rally that "For each one person that is being killed by the taxi industry, we will kill five white people", giving rise to the BLF slogan "1:5". Mngxitama went on to say, "You kill one of us, we will kill five of you. We will kill their children, we will kill their women, we will kill anything that we find on our way." The comments were criticized by many, including the African National Congress, with an ANC spokesperson claiming that "[Mngxitama's] comments clearly incite violence in South Africa" and urging the South African Human Rights Commission to investigate. The Congress of the People and Democratic Alliance also criticized the statements and filed criminal charges against Mngxitama for incitement of violence. Mngxitama's Twitter account was also suspended as a result. In response, the BLF’s deputy president, Zanele Lwana, responded that Mngxitama's comments were made in the context of self-defense and that "The only sin committed by BLF president is defending black people. President Mngxitama correctly stated that for every one black life taken, five whites would be taken!"

In March 2022, the Equality Court of South Africa ordered BLF members Lindsay Maasdorp and Zwelakhe Dubasi to pay R200,000 in damages and make a public apology for “celebrat[ing] the tragic deaths” of four children on social media in statements that were judged to be hate speech. The four children, all of whom were white, died when a walkway collapsed at Hoërskool Driehoek in Vanderbijlpark.

=== Racism against Asian Africans ===
There are over 1.2 million South Africans of Indian descent, with the majority living in the province of KwaZulu-Natal.

The 2001 Zulu language song AmaNdiya by Mbongeni Ngema was banned as hate speech for being racially derogatory towards the Indian community and promoting anti-Indian sentiment; by blaming the Indian community of oppressing and dispossessing ethnic Zulus whilst making a number of sweeping generalisations. Ngema defended singing the song by claiming that it represented the views of many black South Africans.

In 2015, Phumlani Mfeka, a KwaZulu-Natal businessman and the spokesman for the radical Mazibuye African Forum, tweeted "A good Indian is a dead Indian". He published a letter in the city press claiming that South Africans of Indian origin have no right to citizenship or property in South Africa. Mfeka also claimed there is a "ticking time bomb of a deadly confrontation" between Africans and Indians in KwaZulu-Natal. The South African court barred him from making anti-Indian remarks in November 2015.

In 2017, political leader Julius Malema stated during a rally in KwaZulu-Natal, "They are ill-treating our people. They are worse than Afrikaners were. This is not an anti-Indian statement, it's the truth. Indians who own shops don't pay our people, but they give them food parcels," and accused local politicians of being in the pockets of Indian businesspeople. Malema also said that the success of Indian businesses in the province was due to their strategies of exploitation and monopolization of the economy. Malema also referred to Indians in 2011 as 'coolies,' which is considered a strongly offensive pejorative term in contemporary South Africa.

Complaints of attacks on the ethnic Chinese community on social media have led to charges being filed against certain white individuals. The Chinese Association of Gauteng planned to also file a complaint with the South African Human Rights Commission.

=== Racism against Jewish Africans ===
The vigilante group PAGAD is believed to be responsible for bombings targeted at synagogues between 1998 and 2000. PAGAD's leaders became known for their antisemitic statements. A 1997 incendiary bomb attack on a Jewish bookshop owner was found by police to have been committed with the same material PAGAD used in other attacks.

In May 1998, Radio 786, a Cape Town community radio station run by a Muslim organization and aimed at Muslims, broadcast a program that denied the Holocaust and engaged in antisemitic stereotypes, which the South African Jewish Board of Deputies subsequently reported as hate speech. Radio 786 refused to apologize for the broadcast. Although an out-of-court settlement was eventually reached, the Supreme Court of Appeal found that that complaint had to be referred again to the Independent Communications Authority of South Africa. The matter was finally resolved sixteen years later, when the two parties released a joint statement, accepting that the program had caused offense to the Jewish community but that no offense had been intended by the Muslim station.

In 2009, South Africa's deputy foreign minister, Fatima Hajaig, claimed that "Jewish money controls America and most Western countries." Her comments prompted criticism by Foreign Minister Nkosazana Dlamini-Zuma and a reported "dressing down" by President Kgalema Motlanthe. She subsequently apologized on two occasions for her remarks.

In 2013, ANC Western Cape leader Marius Fransman claimed 98% of land and property owners in Cape Town are "white" and "Jewish." The allegation turned out to be false.

== See also ==
- Cape Qualified Franchise
- Intra-African migration
- Racism in Africa
- Xenophobia in South Africa
