= SA Waste Holdings =

South African waste management company

SA Waste Holdings (Pty) Ltd
- Company type: Proprietary Limited Liability Company
- Industry: Waste disposal
- Founded: Johannesburg, South Africa (1990)
- Headquarters: Johannesburg, South Africa
- Number of locations: 2 branches (2008)
- Area served: Gauteng, South Africa
- Key people: Herman Ackermann (Director), Renox Molatedi (Unknown Designation)
- Services: Waste collection and disposal
- Number of employees: 626 (2000)
- Website: https://www.sawaste.co.za

SA Waste Holdings (Pty) Ltd is a waste management company, based in Johannesburg, South Africa, in Gauteng Province. It was launched in 1990, and as of 2003 had 626 staff members. The company has clients in the retail, commercial, entertainment and gambling sectors. SA Waste is a BEE (Black Economic Empowerment) conscious company, and has a Black Economic Empowerment (BEE) subsidiary, Kofifi Thusano (Pty) Ltd.

== Business Listings ==
SA Waste Holdings (Pty) Ltd is a registered recycler with the Gauteng Department of Agriculture, Conservation and Environment (DACE) as of 30 September 2005, and a registered transporter with the same department, as of 19 September 2007.

The company and its subsidiaries are listed in a variety of online business directories and government sources such as FindSA, Firstier, and Business Day's list of companies. On 18 March 2005, they appeared in a Government Notice, on the Schedule of designated employers that have submitted employment equity reports in terms of Section 21, of the Employment Equity Act, Act No. 55 of 1998.

== Known customers (past, present and prospective) ==
SA Waste is a registered contractor with Sabai (a townhouse complex in Randburg). It is unclear what services they provide to Sabai, as Pikitup is the only company in Johannesburg that is permitted to collect waste form residential buildings.

According to the April/May 2000 issue of Vodaworld Magazine, Vodacom also counted themselves as a client. SA Waste was responsible for collecting waste from Vodacom's site on a daily basis, and transporting it to their recycling plant, where it would be sorted and sold to external recycling companies.

=== Pikitup ===
In 2006 to 2007, the company was a registered supplier to Pikitup, where they were awarded tender number PU 68/2003, providing hire of labour to the parastatal. This contract ended on 28 February 2007.

SA Waste is in the process (as of March 2008) of tendering for another contract at Pikitup. This one will involve providing of a total refuse removal service (Including round-collected refuse removal, street cleaning, servicing of garden sites, and servicing informal settlements) for Johannesburg's Ivory Park area. The closing date for bids on this tender was 7 March 2008, at 11:00 SAST, and proposals are currently being considered. More information on this contract can be found at on the Pikitup website.

== In the news ==
On 12 May 2005, Gauteng environment minister Khabisi Mosunkutu paid a surprise visit to their recycling plant in Marlboro, near Alexandra (North of Johannesburg). The company was accused of illegally using their recycling plant to store non-recyclable and unsortable waste. Following the visit, the minister instructed that the site be shut down immediately and be given 14 days to remove all rubbish from the area. This was not the first such warning the company had been issued with. On 29 May 2005, the debacle was reported by the popular wildlife and environmental programme, 50/50. After much effort from SA Waste to clean up their operations, they were granted a conditional green light to resume operations, on 30 September 2005.

On 7 July 2005, SA Waste participated in Reach For a Dream's attempt at the Guinness World Record for a 2.6 kilometres (1.6 mi) long birthday cake (An event which took place at Cresta Shopping Centre in Johannesburg). This attempt was successful, with the official length of the cake being 2,666 metres (8,747 ft).
