= André Moss =

South African politician

André Moss MPL

Member of the Limpopo Provincial Legislature
- Incumbent
- Assumed office 22 October 2024
- Preceded by: Marcelle Maritz

Personal details
- Born: Pietersburg, Transvaal Province, South Africa
- Party: Freedom Front Plus
- Profession: Politician

André Moss is a South African politician who has served as a Member of the Limpopo Provincial Legislature since October 2024, representing the Freedom Front Plus, of which he serves as the provincial leader.

== Life and career ==
Moss was born in Pietersburg, now known as Polokwane, before moving to Tzaneen. Moss became involved politics and joined the Freedom Front Plus, winning a seat on the Greater Tzaneen Local Municipality council in the 2021 local government elections. He was also the manager of Glassfit in the town during his tenure as a councillor.

Following the death of FF Plus provincial leader and party representative in the Limpopo Provincial Legislature, Marcelle Maritz, Moss was selected by the FF Plus to fill the casual vacancy in the legislature. He was sworn in to the provincial legislature on 22 October 2024. Shortly afterwards, he was elected succeed Maritz as the party's provincial leader.
