= Ombline Desbassayns =

French planter and slave trader (1755–1846)

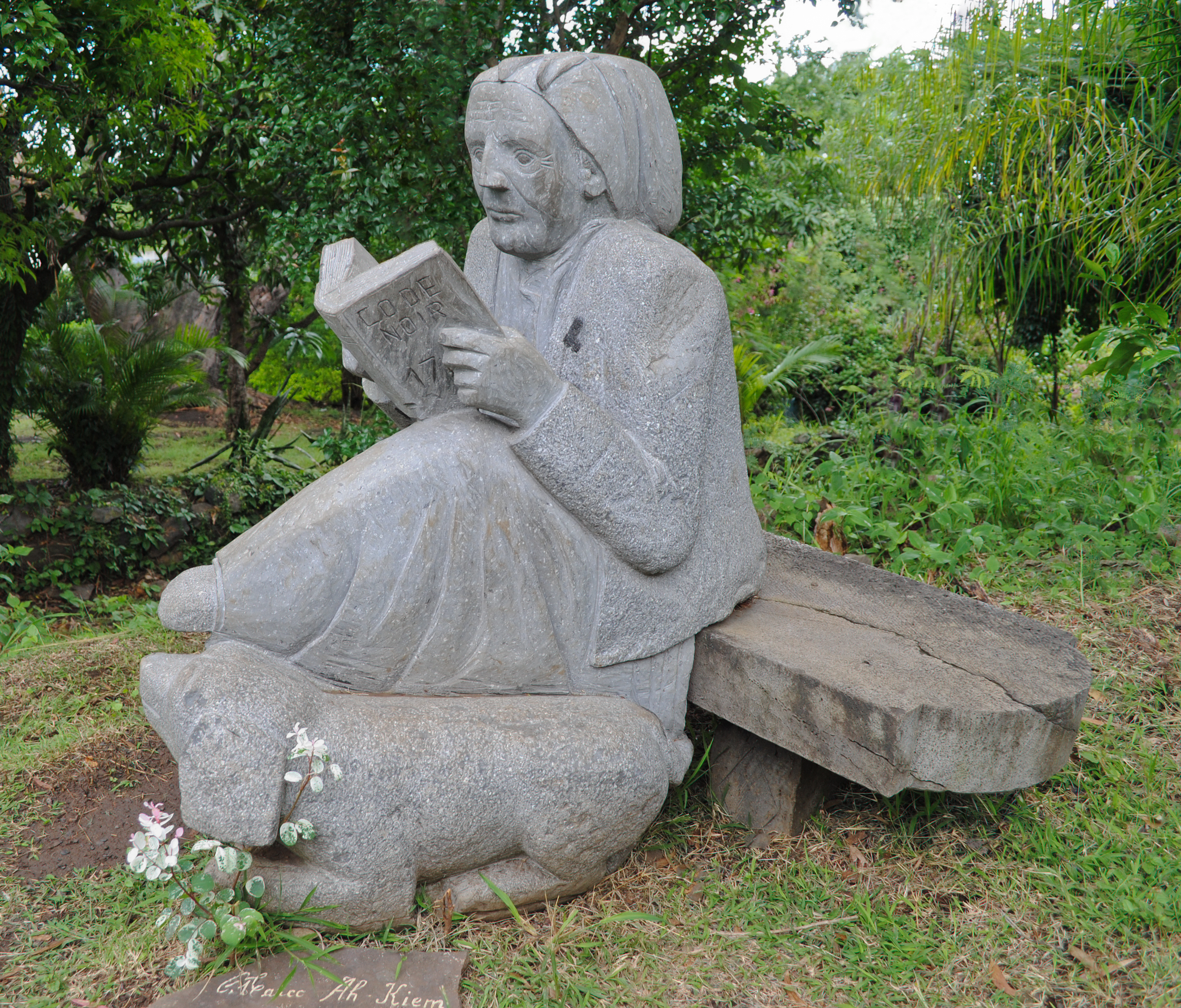
Sculpture of Desbassayns

Marie Anne Thérèse Ombline Desbassayns (3 July 1755 – 4 February 1846), known as Madame Desbassayns, was a French planter and slave trader on the colony of Réunion. She was one of the most prominent slave planters of the island after she was widowed in 1800 and until death, and played a significant role in the economy and slave industry of the colony. She became an important figure in the local folklore, and one of the most well-known figures of the history of the island.

== Life ==
Ombline Desbassayns was born in Saint-Paul on La Réunion. In 1770, she married the planter Henri Paulin Panon Desbassayns (1732–1800) and became the mother of Philippe, Charles, and Joseph Desbassayns. When she was widowed, she took over the business of her late spouse and enjoyed a long and successful career in managing and expanding the sugar and coffee plantation industry on the island through slave labour.

== Legacy ==
Desbassayns is not noted to have been particularly cruel during her own lifetime—it was for example noted that she founded a hospital for the use of slave patients. After her death, Ombline Desbassayns came to be a symbol of the epoch of slavery on the island (slavery was abolished in 1848, only two years after her death), and it became common to reproach people who acted cruelly by saying that the epoch of Madame Desbassayns was long gone and cruel behaviour was no longer acceptable. A legend claimed that the volcano of Piton de la Fournaise once erupted because Desbassayns had buried her sins in it. In local folklore, Ombline Desbassayns became associated with the demon witch Grand-mère Kalle.
