= Kaffir Boy =

1986 autobiography by Mark Mathabane

Kaffir Boy: The True Story of a Black Youth's Coming of Age in Apartheid South Africa
- Author: Mark Mathabane
- Genre: Autobiography
- Publisher: Macmillan
- Publication date: 1986
- Media type: Print

Kaffir Boy: The True Story of a Black Youth's Coming of Age in Apartheid South Africa is Mark Mathabane's 1986 autobiography about life under the South African apartheid regime. It focuses on the brutality of the apartheid system and how he escaped from it, and from the township Alexandra, to become a well-known tennis player. He also depicted how the young black children dealt with racism, segregation, and stereotypes. By embracing education, he is able to rise out of despair and destitution.

== Plot summary ==
At his mother's insistence, Mathabane starts school and learns to love it, rising to the top of his class in spite of frequent punishments due to his family's late payments for school fees and inability to afford school supplies. He graduates from primary school with a scholarship that will pay for his secondary education.

Mathabane's grandmother becomes a gardener for a liberal white English family, the Smiths, who give Mathabane second hand comic books, novels and tennis equipment. His English improves greatly through reading these materials, and he begins to play tennis frequently. Mathabane is eventually befriended by a coloured tennis coach who trains him.

Mathabane joins the high school tennis team and begins to play in tournaments, unofficially sponsored by Wilfred Horn, owner of the Tennis Ranch. It is technically illegal for Mark to play there, but the law is ignored and he becomes more comfortable with whites who frequent the Tennis Ranch. Eventually renowned tennis player Stan Smith takes Mathabane under his wing when the two meet at a tournament. Stan pays for Mathabane to compete in tournaments and talks to his coach at the University of Southern California about Mathabane attending college in the United States. The coach writes to colleges on his behalf, and Mathabane earns a tennis scholarship to Limestone College and leaves for the U.S. in 1978.

== Characters and important people ==
- Arthur Ashe – A black American tennis player who wins the Wimbledon tournament. His game play encourages Mathabane to become a tennis player.
- Mark Mathabane – The author and narrator of the book
- The Smiths – The white family who introduced Mathabane to comic books and tennis.
- Wilfred Horn – Owner of exclusive Tennis Ranch and unofficial sponsor of Mathabane.
- Stan Smith – Renowned tennis player who relocates Mathabane to the United States by finding a college who is willing to give the author a tennis scholarship.
- [Abe 'Scara' Thomas] - Was like a father to Mark. He introduced him to tennis, gave him his first tennis racquet and mentored/coached him until he got the scholarship to the USA. He introduced Mark to different people who were prominent in the tennis circle. Abe Thomas loved Marvel comic books and collected them.

== Controversy ==
Kaffir Boy has been banned in a number of schools, one of these being Cedar Crest High School, where the ban made headlines. The bans are due to a controversial scene involving child prostitution of young boys, which some have referred to as "pornography," sparking another headline defending the scene. While Mathabane wrote an article for The Washington Post stating that he would prefer it to be banned completely to being revised or censored, Mathabane has since authorized a revised version for use in such schools. The unrevised book is still used as high school reading material regardless of the controversial scenes.

== Reception and awards ==
The book Kaffir Boy has won the prestigious Christopher Award for inspiring hope. The book reached number one on the Washington Post Bestseller's List and number three on the New York Times Bestseller's List. It has also been chosen by the American Library Association for inclusion on the list of "Outstanding Books for the College-Bound and Life-Long Learners."
