= Alexandra Renewal Project =

Urban renewal project in South Africa

The Alexandra Renewal Project (ARP) is an urban renewal project in Alexandra, Gauteng, northern Johannesburg, South Africa. The project is one of eight urban nodes of the "Integrated Sustainable Rural Development and Urban Renewal Programme" announced by President Thabo Mbeki in his State of the Nation Address to Parliament on 9 February 2001. This programme is a key component of the Government's approach to addressing urbanisation and housing challenges in South Africa and comprises the integrated development of an area addressing economic, social and physical challenges simultaneously.

The estimated budget in 2001 for the Alexandra Renewal Project to redevelop Alexandra was R1,3 billion over 7 years.

The ARP hoped to fundamentally change the physical, economic, and social environment of Alexandra. It is a joint urban regeneration project between all three tiers of government, the private sector, NGO's and community-based organisations. The project has gone through several administrative changes and is currently being overseen by Julian Baskin.

In June/July 2008, the grassroots photographic project Shooting Jozi inspired by the Academy Award-winning documentary Born into Brothels took place with local community members in Alex.

As township tourism rises in South Africa, Alexandra, through the ARP, is developing its tourism industry. Associate Director Darlene Louw runs local economic development and tourism.

The Department of Housing recently extended the Alexandra Renewal Project to the end of the 2009/10 financial year. So far, R1,2-billion has been spent on this, and there are currently 26 infrastructure projects and 12 housing projects being implemented in Alexandra.
