= Crimen injuria =

Crime under South African common law

Crimen injuria is a crime under South African common law, defined as the act of "unlawfully, intentionally, and seriously impairing the dignity of another." Although difficult to precisely define, the crime is used in the prosecution of certain instances of road rage, stalking, racially offensive language, emotional or psychological abuse, and sexual offences against children.

== Etymology ==
The phrase crimen injuria is Latin, short for crimen injuria datum, meaning roughly "crime of committed injury".
