= Alexandra, South Africa =

Alexandra
- Location within Gauteng Location within South Africa Location within Africa
- Coordinates: 26°6.23′S 28°5.77′E
- Country: South Africa
- Province: Gauteng
- Municipality: City of Johannesburg
- Main Place: Johannesburg
- Established: 1912

Area
  - Total: 6.91 km^{2} (2.67 sq mi)

Population (2011)
  - Total: 179,624
  - Density: 26,000/km^{2} (67,300/sq mi)

Racial makeup (2011)
  - Black African: 99.0%
  - Coloured: 0.4%
  - Indian/Asian: 0.1%
  - White: 0.1%
  - Other: 0.4%

First languages (2011)
  - Zulu: 26.3%
  - Northern Sotho: 23.1%
  - Tsonga: 11.3%
  - Xhosa: 9.8%
  - Other: 29.6%
- Time zone: UTC+2 (SAST)
- Postal code (street): 2090
- PO box: 2014

Alexandra, informally abbreviated to Alex, is a township in the Gauteng province of South Africa. It forms part of the City of Johannesburg Metropolitan Municipality and is located next to the wealthy suburb of Sandton. Alexandra is bounded by Wynberg on the west, Marlboro and Kelvin on the north, Kew, Lombardy West and Lombardy East on the south. Alexandra is one of the poorest urban areas in the country. Alexandra is situated on the banks of the Jukskei River. In addition to its original, reasonably well-built houses, it also has a large number (estimated at more than 20,000) of informal dwellings or "shacks" called imikhukhu.

== History ==
=== Early history ===
Alexandra was established in 1912, on land that had been owned by a farmer, a Mr H.B. Papenfus, who tried to establish a white residential township there, naming it after his wife, Alexandra. However, because it was (at the time) a considerable distance from the centre of Johannesburg, this was not a great success. Consequently, in 1912, Alexandra was proclaimed as a so-called "native township". Because the township was proclaimed before the South African 1913 Land Act, it was one of the few urban areas in the country where black people could own land under a freehold title.

By 1916, the population of Alexandra had grown to 30,000 people. The Alexandra Health Committee was established to manage the township. However, the Committee was not allowed to collect local taxes, nor was the Johannesburg City Council willing to take responsibility for an area that it claimed fell outside its jurisdiction, leading to a lack of resources and proper management. When the National Party came into power in 1948 and started to implement its policy of apartheid, Alexandra was put under the direct control of the then Department of Native Affairs.

=== 1950–2000 ===
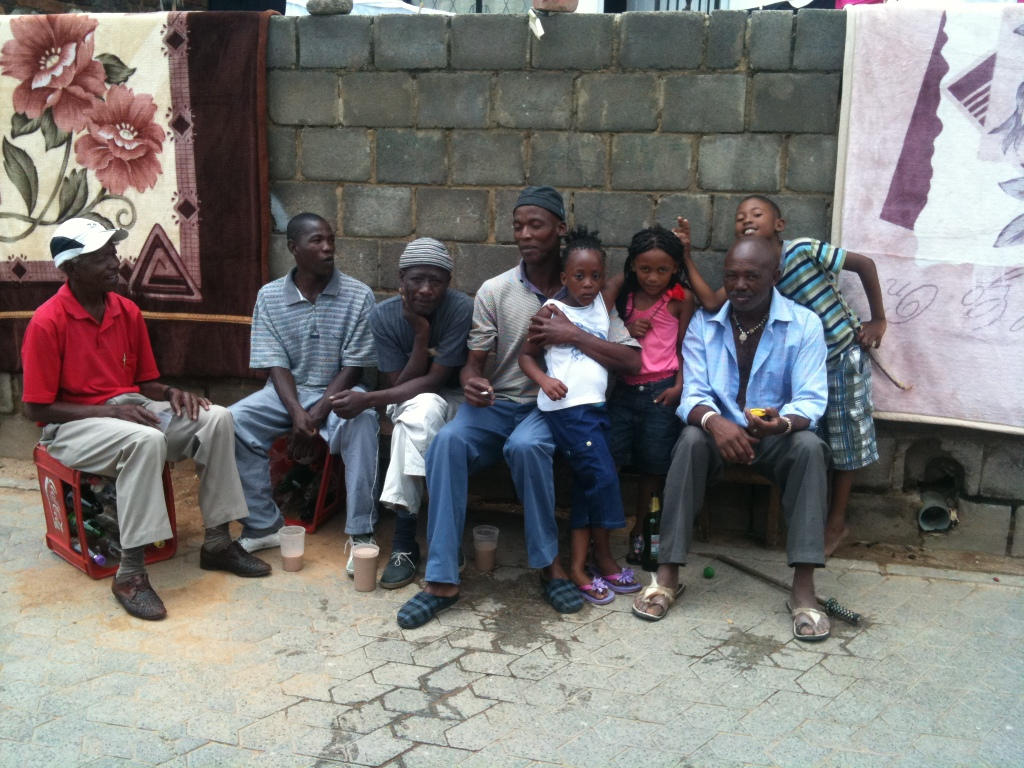
Local residents of 15th Ave, Alexandra

In the early 1960s, the government decided to demolish all family accommodation in Alexandra and replace them with single-sex hostels, which led to widespread resistance and protest. However, owing to the high costs, lack of alternative housing for the persons that would have to have been removed and the escalating opposition led by the Reverend Sam Buti's "Save Alexandra Party", only two hostels were actually completed, and so the scheme was cancelled in 1979.

The riots that started in Soweto in June 1976 quickly spread to other areas such as Alexandra, where 19 people were killed. As a consequence of these riots, evictions, forced removals and expropriation of black properties were stopped; city blacks were no longer viewed as transient residents and their permanent status used to be recognised.

Finally, in 1982, Alexandra was given the official status of a residential area and the then Alexandra liaison committee, led by Rev Buti, was instituted to run the township.

In 1980 a "Master Plan" for Alexandra was introduced, whose aim was to transform Alexandra into a "Garden City" with a completely new layout. However, only a small part of this plan was actually ever implemented; the execution of the "Master Plan" was permanently stopped by the violent "Alex Six Days" uprising in February 1986. The uprising resulted from an attack by the security forces on a funeral in the township. 40 people were killed. The Alexandra Township Committee, led by trade unionist Moses Mayekiso, were arrested and beaten. Mayekiso was only released following a strike by metal workers.

By May the council started collapsing and the councillors resigned which saw the emergence of street committees and peoples' courts. After the imposition of the nationwide state of emergency in June, the Defence Force moved in to keep the peace. In its place, the government introduced the "Urban Renewal Plan" as part of its strategy during the state of emergency. However, this plan led to considerable demolitions, disruptions and displacement in the community as well as two treason trials involving 13 leaders of Alexandra.

This, combined with the considerable number of additional people moving into Alexandra during this time, led to a new area called the "East Bank" being built. Because of the insufficient capacity and difficult maintenance of the newly built infrastructure, the situation quickly deteriorated and thus the "Urban Renewal Plan" was shelved in 1990. During the communal and political conflicts that took place in the 1991–1992 period, many people were killed, injured or displaced. This led to several peace initiatives, which were greatly assisted by the first fully democratic South African elections in April 1994.

=== 2000s to present ===
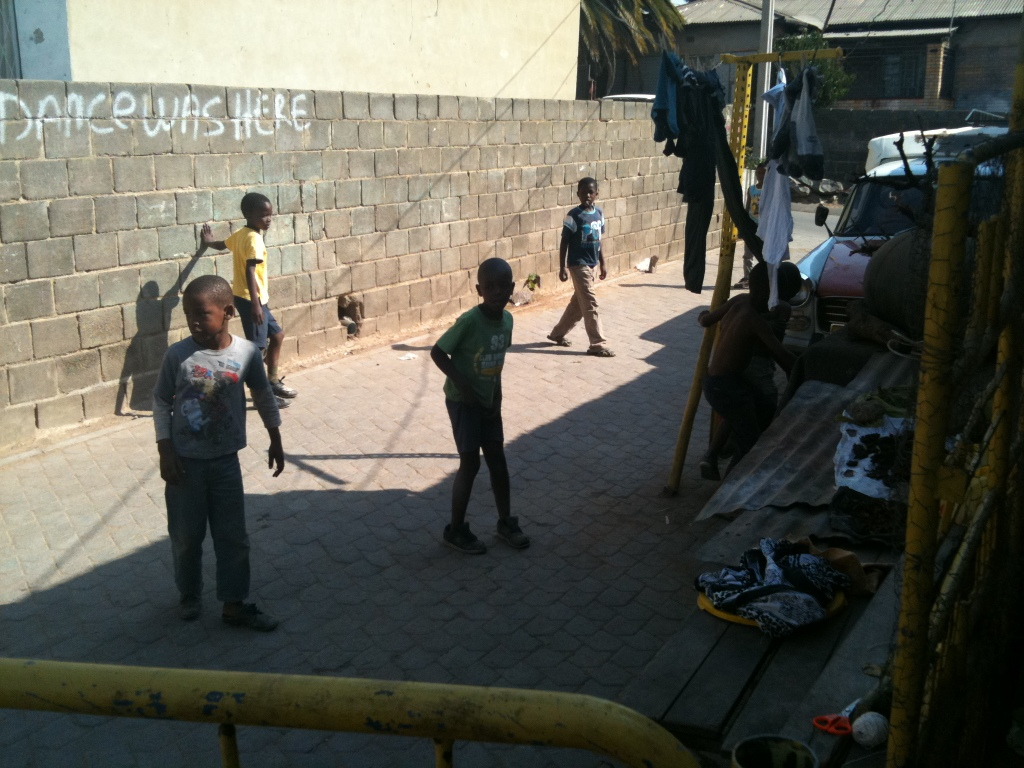
Children playing soccer

To assist in renewing and uplift the community, the Alexandra Renewal Project was launched in 2000. The project has caused clashes between residents and companies, including SA Waste Holdings (Pty) Ltd, a waste disposal company based in nearby Marlboro.

Approximately 3,000 houses have been built for relocation purposes to date. In August 2006 an American business student conducted a photography project with 190 of the youth of Alexandra. It resulted in a book, alexandra: our view of ekasi. In June/July 2008 the grassroots photographic project Shooting Jozi inspired by the Academy award-winning documentary Born into Brothels took place in Alexandra with local community members.

In May 2008 a series of xenophobic attacks that took place throughout South Africa started in Alexandra Township. Foreigners including Zimbabweans, Mozambicans, Congolese, and even some South Africans from the north living there were attacked.

== Sports ==
Gomora United, who won the 2024–25 SAFA Second Division, are based in Alexandra.

== Notable residents ==
Notable residents of Alexandra included:

- Nelson Mandela
- Kgalema Petrus Motlanthe
- Zanele Mbeki (wife of former President Thabo Mbeki)
- Mark Mathabane (tennis player and author of the autobiography Kaffir Boy).
- Samora Machel (former Mozambiquan president)
- Alfred Nzo (South African Minister of Foreign Affairs, 1994–1999)
- Joe Modise (South African Minister of Defence, 1994–1999)
- Hugh Masekela (musician and jazz trumpeter, 1939–2018)
- Wally Serote (poet)
- Thami Mnyele (artist/activist)
- Simon Mahlathini Nkabinde (groaner/lead singer in Mahlathini and the Mahotella Queens, 1938–1999)
- Irvin Khoza (sports administrator)
- Lesetja Kganyago
- Paul Mashatile
- Nkululeko Flabba Habedi (rapper)
- L-Tido (Rapper)
- Josiah De Disciple (Record producer & DJ)
- Obed Bapela
- Hastings Banda (former president of Malawi)
- Mr JazziQ (record producer & DJ)
- Lionel Petersen
