= Moonyeenn Lee =

South African casting director (1944–2020)

- Born: February 1944; Johannesburg, South Africa
- Died: 18 July 2020 (aged 76); Johannesburg
- Occupation: Casting director
- Years active: 1974–2020
- Spouse: Leon Lee (div. 1973)
- Children: 2

Moonyeenn Lee (February 1944 – 18 July 2020) was a South African casting director, talent agent and producer. She earned Primetime Emmy Award nominations for her work on the Hulu series The Looming Tower and the 2016 Roots remake. She became the first South African member of both the Motion Picture and Television Academies.

Lee founded the talent agency Moonyeenn Lee & Associates (MLA) in 1974 and Khulisa Productions in 1998. She was awarded the Lionel Ngakane Lifetime Achievement Award at the 2017 South African Film and Television Awards.

== Early and personal life ==
Lee was born in Johannesburg. She was named after a character from the 1932 film Smilin' Through. She moved to England, where she was mostly educated, when she was 7 for her mother Shirley Hepburn's work as a stage actress whilst her father stayed behind in South Africa. She began working for a knitwear company in London at 17.

Lee and salesman Leon Lee were married for five years and divorced in 1974. The pair had a son David and a daughter Cindy. After her divorce, Lee was looking for a new career. She trained to become an agent with James Fraser of Fraser and Dunlop in England.

Lee raised her children in Parkmore, who both now work in the entertainment industry. She later lived in Rosebank.

Lee's agency MLA announced Lee had died at the age of 76 in Johannesburg of complications related to COVID-19 on the morning of 18 July 2020. A number of actors, other industry people, and Minister of Arts and Culture Nathi Mthethwa paid their tributes.

== Filmography ==
=== Film ===
Year	Title	Notes
1979	Game for Vultures	
1979	Plekkie in die son	
1986	Nag van Vrees	
1987	Nukie	
1987	Jane and the Lost City	
1988	An African Dream	
1988	Red Scorpion	Produced
1988	Blind Justice	
1989	Jobman	Produced
1991	Panga	
1993	Friends	
1997	Jump the Gun	
1998	Tarzan and the Lost City	
1998	The Quarry	
1998	The Storekeeper	Short film; produced
1999	A Reasonable Man	
2000	The King Is Alive	
2001	High Explosive	
2002	Promised Land	Produced
2003	The Wooden Camera	
2004	In My Country	
2004	Max and Mona	
2004	Hotel Rwanda	
2005	Tsotsi	
2006	Catch a Fire	
2006	Blood Diamond	
2007	Goodbye Bafana	
2008	Triomf	Produced
2010	Life, Above All	
2010	State of Violence	
2010	The Bang Bang Club	
2010	The First Grader	
2011	How to Steal 2 Million	
2011	Lucky	
2011	Machine Gun Preacher	
2012	Safe House	
2013	Fanie Fourie's Lobola	
2013	Mandela: Long Walk to Freedom	
2013	Four Corners	
2013	Cold Harbour	
2014	Faan se trein	
2014	Leading Lady	
2014	Impunity	
2014	The Good Lie	
2015	The Endless River	
2015	Eye in the Sky	
2016	Shepherds and Butchers	
2016	Vaya	
2017	Beyond the River	
2017	The Number	
2017	Five Fingers for Marseilles	
2019	Serenity	
2019	This Is Not a Burial, It's a Resurrection	

=== Television ===
Year	Title	Notes
1986	The Summer House	Television film
1994	The Line	Television film
1996	Inside	Television film
1997	Mandela and de Klerk	Television film
1998	Diamond Girl	Television film
1998	Running Wild	Television film
1999–2004	Yizo Yizo	
2001	Dr Lucille: The Lucille Teasdale Story	Television film
2002	In Desert and Wilderness	
2007–2012	Wild at Heart	
2007	Life Is Wild	
2008	The Devil's Whore	Miniseries
2009	Hopeville	
2009	The No. 1 Ladies' Detective Agency	
2009	The Prisoner	Miniseries
2011	Leonardo	
2012	Fynbos	
2012	Dirty Laundry	Short film
2013	Mary and Martha	Television film
2014	Homeland	Season 4
2015	The Gamechangers	Television film
2016	Cape Town	Miniseries
2016	Roots	Miniseries
2016	Hooten & the Lady	Miniseries
2017	Madiba	Miniseries
2018	Black Panther	
2018	The Looming Tower	Miniseries
2019	The Girl from St. Agnes	Miniseries
2019	Warrior	
2019	The Hot Zone	
2020	Shaina	Television film; posthumous release

== Awards and nominations ==
Year	Award	Category	Work	Result
2016	Primetime Emmy Awards	Outstanding Casting for a Limited or Anthology Series or Movie	Roots	Nominated
2017	South African Film and Television Awards	Dr Lionel Ngakane Lifetime Achievement Award	—	Won
2018	Primetime Emmy Awards	Outstanding Casting for a Limited or Anthology Series or Movie	The Looming Tower	Nominated
