= Menzi Ngubane =

South African actor (1964–2021)

- Born: 28 August 1964; Ladysmith, KwaZulu-Natal, South Africa
- Died: 13 March 2021 (aged 56); Ladysmith, KwaZulu-Natal
- Occupation: Actor
- Years active: 1989–2021
- Notable work: Kwakhala Nyonini; Ubambo lwam; Generations; Family Secrets; Studio 263; Isibaya; Yizo Yizo; Ashes to Ashes; How to Steal 2 Million
- Spouses: Lerato Sidibe (m. 2009; div. 2013) Sikelelo Sishuba (m. 2013–2021)
- Children: 4
- Awards: 2012 Africa Movie Academy Awards

Menzi Ngubane (28 August 1964 – 13 March 2021) was a South African actor, best known for playing the role of Sibusiso Dlomo in the soap opera Generations from 2003 to 2014. Ngubane played numerous roles on other South African TV shows, including Yizo Yizo, Ashes to Ashes, Gold Diggers, and Heist. In 2016, he joined the cast of the television drama series Isibaya, playing a taxi firm manager with a dubious past.

Ngubane appeared in a number of South African films, including How to Steal 2 Million (2011) as Jack, alongside John Kani, Terry Pheto and Rapulana Seiphemo. The film won Best Picture at the 2012 Africa Movie Academy Awards. He also starred in other movies such as In My Country (2004) as Dumi Mkhalipi, Askari (2001) as Patrick Khumalo, and The King's Messenger (1990) as Poacher.

He won the SAFTA award for Best Actor in Isibaya.

He was married to Sikelelwa Sishuba. Ngubane suffered ill health for a number of years including receiving a kidney transplant leading up to his death.

Ngubane died from a stroke on 13 March 2021, aged 56. Three days after his death, his 90-year-old father Ndodeni Ngubane also died. They were both buried together, their funeral took place at their home in Ladysmith.
