= Mandela: Long Walk to Freedom =

2013 film by Justin Chadwick

- Theatrical release poster
- Directed by: Justin Chadwick
- Screenplay by: William Nicholson
- Based on: Long Walk to Freedom by Nelson Mandela
- Produced by: David M. Thompson; Anant Singh
- Starring: Idris Elba; Naomie Harris; Tony Kgoroge; Riaad Moosa; Lindiwe Matshikiza; Jamie Bartlett; Terry Pheto; Deon Lotz
- Cinematography: Lol Crawley
- Edited by: Rick Russell
- Music by: Alex Heffes
- Production companies: Pathé; Distant Horizon; Videovision Entertainment; Origin Pictures
- Distributed by: 20th Century Fox (United Kingdom); United International Pictures (South Africa)
- Release dates: 7 September 2013 (TIFF); 28 November 2013 (South Africa); 3 January 2014 (United Kingdom)
- Running time: 146 minutes
- Countries: United Kingdom; South Africa
- Languages: English; Xhosa; Afrikaans
- Budget: $35 million
- Box office: $28 million

Mandela: Long Walk to Freedom is a 2013 biographical film directed by Justin Chadwick from a script written by William Nicholson and starring Idris Elba and Naomie Harris. The film is based on the 1994 autobiographical book Long Walk to Freedom by anti-apartheid revolutionary and former South African President Nelson Mandela.

== Plot ==
Based on South African President Nelson Mandela's autobiography of the same name, which chronicles his early life, coming of age, education and 27 years in prison before becoming President of South Africa and working to improve the country once ravaged by Apartheid.

== Cast ==
- Idris Elba as Nelson Mandela (older adult)
  - Atandwa Kani as Nelson Mandela (age 16–23)
  - Siza Pini as Nelson Mandela (age 7–9)
- Naomie Harris as Winnie Madikizela
- Michelle Scott as Mrs De Kok
- Tony Kgoroge as Walter Sisulu
- S'thandiwe Kgoroge as Albertina Sisulu
- Riaad Moosa as Ahmed Kathrada
- Zolani Mkiva as Raymond Mhlaba
- Simo Mogwaza as Andrew Mlangeni
- Tshallo Sputla Chokwe as Oliver Tambo
- Fana Mokoena as Govan Mbeki
- James Cunningham as George Bizos
- Thapelo Mokoena as Elias Motsoaledi
- Jamie Bartlett as James Gregory
- Deon Lotz as Kobie Coetzee
- Terry Pheto as Evelyn Mase
- Sello Maake as Albert Lutuli
- Gys de Villiers as F. W. de Klerk
- Zenzo Ngqobe as Patrick Lekota
- Carl Beukes as Niel Barnard
- A.J. van der Merwe as Fanie van der Merwe
- Nomfusi Gotyana as Miriam Makeba
- Andre Jacobs as Bram Fischer
- Louis van Niekerk as Quartus de Wet
- Adam Neill as Percy Yutar
- Lindiwe Matshikiza as Zindzi Mandela (age 28–32)
  - Refilwe Charles as Zindzi Mandela (age 8–12)
- Semuhle Shangasi as Zenani Mandela (age 28–32)
  - Khumbuzile Maphumulo as Zenani Mandela (age 8–12)
- John Herbert as Arthur Goldreich
- Armand Aucamp as Warder

== Production ==
Producer Anant Singh began working on the project after interviewing Mandela while he was still imprisoned two decades prior. Following the publication of Mandela's autobiography, Singh was granted the rights to the film adaptation, which was completed 16 years later by screenwriter William Nicholson. The film is directed by Justin Chadwick.

=== Music ===
For the film, U2 wrote the song "Ordinary Love". Subscribers of the band's official website were able to hear a short snippet first.

== Release ==
The film held its world premiere at the Toronto International Film Festival on 7 September 2013. It was released on 28 November 2013 in South Africa and on 3 January 2014 in the United Kingdom, a week before and a month after Mandela died, respectively.

Long Walk to Freedom premiered in London on 5 December 2013 as a Royal Film Performance, an event held in aid of the Film & TV Charity, the Duke and Duchess of Cambridge were in attendance, along with Mandela's daughters Zindzi and Zenani. The announcement of the death of Nelson Mandela occurred while the film was being screened; the Duke and Duchess were immediately informed of Mandela's death, while producer Anant Singh (alongside Idris Elba) took the stage during the closing credits to inform patrons of his death, and held a moment of silence. Prince William made brief comments to the press while exiting the theatre, stating that "I just wanted to say it's extremely sad and tragic news. We were just reminded what an extraordinary and inspiring man Nelson Mandela was. My thoughts and prayers are with him and his family right now." The film was temporarily pulled from theatres in South Africa the next day out of respect, but returned on 7 December 2013. On 8 December to mark the launch of the film a Gala dinner, private screening and charity auction in aid of the children's charity Onetoonechildrensfund. Sir Trevor McDonald was Master of Ceremonies for the evening, introducing the auction where one of a limited edition of six portrait heads of Nelson Mandela, sculpted from life by David Cregeen. The head was donated by the sculptor and sold in aid of the charity's work in South Africa.

=== Critical response ===
On Rotten Tomatoes, the film has an approval rating of 61% based on 142 reviews, with an average rating of 6.21/10. The site's critical consensus reads, "It might be too respectful to truly soar, but there's no denying Idris Elba's impressive work in Mandela: Long Walk to Freedom -- or the inspirational power of the life it depicts." At Metacritic, which assigns a weighted average rating to reviews, the film has an average score of 60 out of 100, based on 32 critics, indicating "mixed or average reviews". Audiences polled by CinemaScore gave the film a rare average grade of "A+" on an A+ to F scale.

Scott Foundas of Variety said the film "never opts for a light touch when a sledgehammer will do", but also praises Elba for "a towering performance, a Mandela for the ages".

Claudia Puig of USA Today agreed that Elba's performance was powerful but felt the film was not as strong, stating, "Earnest and ambitious, the film suffers from trying to squeeze in too many milestones of Nelson Mandela's long life as he worked to end the oppressive regime of apartheid in South Africa. But the talent of the lead actors lends it heft, particularly the commanding performance of Idris Elba as Mandela."

Jordan Hoffman from 'Film.com' also gave the film a mixed to negative review: "Mandela: Long Walk to Freedom should have been a layup. A slow burn leading to eventual triumph, moving speeches, Idris Elba raging against injustice, the world made a better place because of one man's sacrifice. But as crazy and offensive as it may sound, you'll get more chills from Elba's idiotic speech about canceling the apocalypse in Pacific Rim than you will in this by-the-numbers bore."

However, Peter Travers of Rolling Stone gave the film a generally positive review with 2 and a half out of 4 stars, mostly circling the performances.

Screenwriter William Nicholson claimed it didn't do better because of the movie 12 Years a Slave: "12 Years a Slave came out in America and that sucked up all the guilt about black people that was available. They were so exhausted feeling guilty about slavery that I don't think there was much left over to be nice about our film." He also speculated that the death of Mandela resulted in a Mandela "overdose" among people, so that they have had enough of him when the movie finally hit the theatres; "Suddenly the word came through that he died. We were deluged with Mandela stuff and after a week we all thought, please, take it away, we've heard enough about Mandela."

== Historical accuracy ==
Vincent Hiribarren, a lecturer in world history at King's College London, notes in his review of the film for History Extra, the website of BBC History Magazine: "[The film] clearly depicted Mandela's understanding of the apartheid years. Or, at least, what he wanted to let us know. As the film is not based on Mandela's life but on Mandela's own words, criticism levelled at Mandela's autobiography can also be directed at the film."

The film was noted by many for the lack of resemblance Idris Elba had to Mandela. While calling him a "terrific actor", The Guardian criticised the film for the casting of Elba, of West African (Krio and Ga-Adangbe) descent from Ghana and Sierra Leone, as the Southern African (Xhosa) Mandela, because Elba "looks nothing like the man he portrays".

Turning to the 1976 Soweto uprising, Hiribarren said that the film "did not spend much time evoking this pivotal event, because Mandela did not say much about Soweto in his book. The Soweto uprising was, however, instrumental in creating a new political climate in South Africa that directly led to the politicisation of many young South Africans."

Hiribarren awarded the film three stars for historical accuracy, and five for enjoyment.

== Awards ==
Awards
Award	Category	Name	Result
86th Academy Awards	Best Original Song	U2 for "Ordinary Love"	Nominated
ABFF Hollywood Awards	Artist of the Year	Idris Elba (also for Pacific Rim and Thor: The Dark World)	Nominated
71st Golden Globe Awards	Best Actor – Motion Picture Drama	Idris Elba	Nominated
71st Golden Globe Awards	Best Original Score	Alex Heffes	Nominated
71st Golden Globe Awards	Best Original Song – Motion Picture	U2 and Danger Mouse ("Ordinary Love")	Won
19th Critics' Choice Awards	Best Song		Nominated
Motion Picture Sound Editors Golden Reel Awards	Best Sound Editing: Music Score in a Feature Film	Lewis Morison	Nominated
