= Mandela: The Authorised Biography =

1999 book by Anthony Sampson

- Author: Anthony Sampson
- Cover artist: Annie Leibovitz
- Language: English
- Genre: Biography
- Publisher: HarperCollins
- Publication date: 1999
- Publication place: South Africa
- Media type: Print (hardback & paperback)
- Pages: 678
- ISBN: 0-00-638845-0
- OCLC: 44484875

Mandela: The Authorised Biography is a study of Nelson Mandela, the former President of South Africa, by the British journalist Anthony Sampson.

Sampson's book was published in 1999, five years after Mandela's autobiography, Long Walk to Freedom. The book was one of the first to examine such issues as Winnie Mandela's crimes, and State President Frederik Willem de Klerk's suspected attempts to use the security forces to derail peace talks.

== De Klerk and the Third Force ==
Sampson said that de Klerk had exacerbated the violence in several ways. De Klerk was reportedly ignoring the violence of the Zulu-nationalist Inkatha Freedom Party (IFP) when directed against ANC (and vice versa), in the hope of splitting anti-apartheid forces. De Klerk also permitted Inkatha supporters to carry "traditional weapons" in their rallies, with which they caused much injury. Sampson cited an occasion when the ANC tipped off the government that IFP was planning a violent protest: the police did nothing, and thirty people were killed.

Mandela had himself made these criticisms in Long Walk to Freedom, but Sampson also broached new topics. Sampson accused de Klerk of permitting his police and defence ministers to sponsor both Inkatha and secret pro-apartheid organisations that terrorised opposition movements, the Third Force. In 1991 de Klerk demoted those ministers, Adriaan Vlok and Magnus Malan respectively, and began an inquiry that Sampson described as a whitewash conducted by interested parties. De Klerk denied this, and said that he had been unable to restrain the third force, even though he wanted to. In an interview in 2004, de Klerk said that his security forces had undermined him by conducting "undercover activities [...] in conflict with the policies which we were trying to advance". He said that the ANC also contained extremist elements that had tried to wreck the peace process.

== James Gregory and Goodbye Bafana ==
Sampson also alleged that Warrant Officer James Gregory, a warder on Robben Island, pretended to have been Mandela's friend while Mandela was imprisoned there, in order to make money. According to Sampson, the close relationship depicted in Gregory's book Goodbye Bafana was a fabrication, and in reality Gregory rarely spoke to Mandela. Gregory censored the letters sent to the future President and thus discovered the details of Mandela's personal life that he included in Goodbye Bafana. Mandela considered suing Gregory, but refrained from doing so when the Prison Department distanced itself from Gregory's book. Sampson also said that other warders, specifically Christo Brand, had told him in interviews that they suspected Gregory of spying for the government. Mandela later invited Gregory to his inauguration as President, apparently having forgiven him as he had forgiven both the former President, Pieter Botha, and the prosecutor, Percy Yutar, who had argued for his execution in the Rivonia Trial.

== See also ==
- Nelson Mandela
- Long Walk to Freedom
- "I Am Prepared to Die" speech
- FW de Klerk
- James Gregory
- Goodbye Bafana
