= Cregeen =

Origin
- Language: Manx
- Meaning: Contracted from O'Criocain, Criocan's son
- Region of origin: Isle of Man

Cregeen is a surname of Manx origin. It is a contraction of O'Criocain, meaning Criocan's son.

== Persons ==
- Archibald Cregeen (died 1841), Manx lexicographer
- David Cregeen, British sculptor
- Graham Cregeen, Manx politician
- Peter Cregeen (born 1940), British television director, producer and executive
