= Terry Pheto =

South African actress

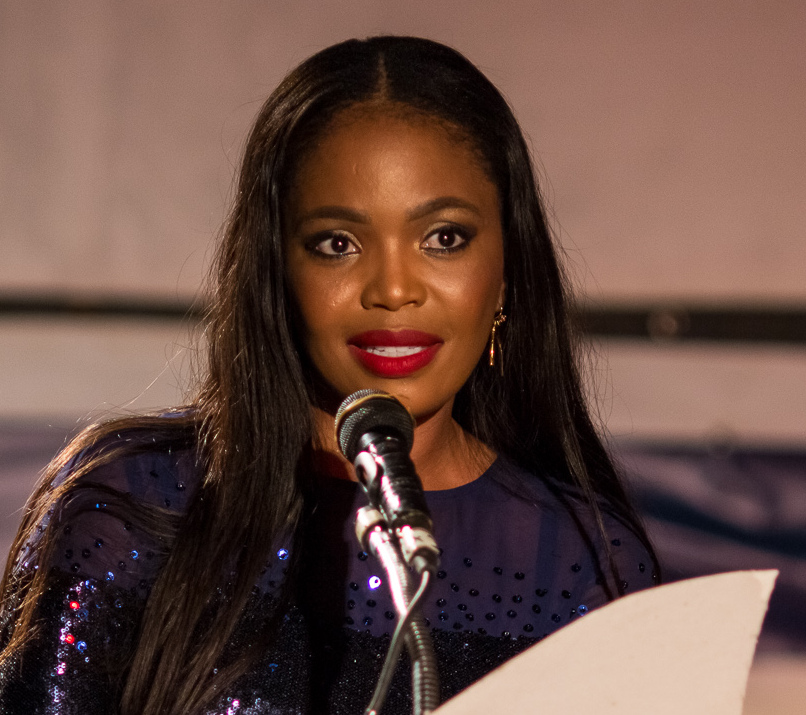
- Pheto at the 2014 Zanzibar International Film Festival
- Born: Moitheri Pheto; 11 May 1981 (age 45); Mahikeng, South Africa
- Occupation: Actress
- Years active: 2005–present
- Spouse: Masande Peter (m. 2019)

Moitheri Pheto (born 11 May 1981) is a South African actress who is known for starring in an Oscar-winning film Tsotsi (2005) and other South African soapies. She had a recurring role of a heart surgeon, Dr. Malaika Maponya, on the American soap opera The Bold and the Beautiful. Terry Pheto is among a group of individuals and companies implicated in the National Lotteries Commission corruption scandal.

== Early life ==
Raised in Soweto until the age of 20, Pheto was spotted by casting agent Moonyeenn Lee in a theatre group in Soweto during the casting process for Tsotsi with Presley Chweneyagae.

== Career ==
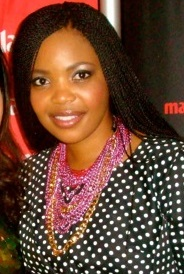
Pheto in 2013

After her debut in Tsotsi, Pheto appeared in other films such as Catch a Fire (2006), Goodbye Bafana (2007) and How to Steal 2 Million (2012).

Television series she has acted in include the SABC1 drama series Justice for All (as Lerato), Zone 14 (as Pinky Khumba) and Jacob's Cross, as Mbali. Pheto played the key role of Fikile in the SABC2 mini-series Hopeville, from March to April 2009. The series was later made into an award-winning film. In 2011, after leaving South Africa to try her luck in Hollywood, she landed a recurring role of a heart surgeon, Dr. Malaika Maponya, on the American soap opera The Bold and the Beautiful. She was the subject of an episode of the Nicky Greenwall-hosted documentary series The Close Up, which aired on e.tv and the eNews Channel in 2012. In the same year, she was a featured subject in the first episode of the second season of the SABC1 reality series Play Your Part, aired on 9 July 2012. In 2010, she was a guest judge on the SABC1 reality competition Class Act, in the "Film Noir" episode.

She has also acted in the theatre productions The Toilet (directed by Bongani Linda) and The Devil's Protest, directed by Thulani Didi.

In July 2008, she modelled in several advertisements and campaigns for L'Oréal. She has also been featured in numerous magazines, including Destiny, Vanity Fair, Drum, You/Huisgenoot, Y-Magazine, Bona, Heat, Elle, Cosmopolitan, Marie Claire and True Love.

== South African National Lottery Corruption Investigation ==
In March 2023, her house in the Johannesburg suburb of Bryanston was prevented from being put on auction by the South African Special Investigating Unit and Asset Forfeiture Unit as a part of an investigation of corrupt use of National Lottery funds. The investigation has revealed that the funds earmarked for cultural campaigns and projects was used for buying land and building houses. Pheto paid R3 million into a trust account set up by the construction company. The property was then signed over to her, with the construction company keeping the accrued interest without a mortgage being paid, according to the South African Special Investigating Unit. Pheto's attorneys have not appealed the preservation order to halt the auction and are cooperating with the investigation.

== Personal life ==
In 2019, Pheto was expecting her first child with fiancé, Masande Peter.

== Filmography ==
- Tsotsi (2005) - Miriam
- Catch a Fire (2006) Miriam
- Day and Night (2006)
- Goodbye Bafana (2007) - Zindzi Mandela
- Mafrika (2008) - Malinda
- The Bold and The Beautiful (2011) - Dr. Malaika Maponya
- How to Steal 2 Million (2012) - Olive
- Mandela: Long Walk to Freedom (2013) - Evelyn Mase
- Cuckold (2015) - Laura
- A United Kingdom (2016) - Naledi Khama
- The Number (2017)
- Madiba TV series (2017) - Winnie Mandela
- Faces (2018) - Aisha

== Accolades ==
- Africa Movie Academy Awards for Best Actress in a supporting role
- 2012, Golden Horn Award for her Best Supporting Actress: How to Steal 2 Million
