= Dare Not Linger =

2017 book by Nelson Mandela and Mandla Langa

Dare Not Linger: The Presidential Years
- First edition
- Author: Nelson Mandela, Mandla Langa
- Language: English
- Published: 2017
- Publisher: Pan Macmillan
- Publication place: South Africa
- ISBN: 978-0-374-13471-6 (Hardcover)

Dare Not Linger: The Presidential Years is a book by Nelson Mandela and Mandla Langa describing Mandela's term as President of South Africa. It was published in 2017, four years after Mandela's death, and is based on an unfinished memoir that Mandela had worked on after his term as president, as well as archive material and interviews, and has a prologue by Graça Machel. The book's title comes from the closing sentence of Mandela's previous autobiography Long Walk to Freedom: "But I can only rest for a moment, for with freedom come responsibilities, and I dare not linger, for my long walk is not yet ended."
