= Long Walk to Freedom =

Autobiography of Nelson Mandela

- First edition
- Author: Nelson Mandela
- Cover artist: Allan Tannenbaum
- Language: English
- Subject: Autobiography
- Publisher: Little, Brown and Company
- Publication date: 1994
- Publication place: South Africa
- Media type: Print (hardback and paperback)
- Pages: 630 pp
- ISBN: 0-316-87496-5
- OCLC: 39296287

Long Walk to Freedom is an autobiography by Nelson Mandela, South Africa's first democratically elected President, and it was first published in 1994 by Little Brown & Co. The book profiles his early life, coming of age, education and 27 years spent in prison. Under the apartheid government, Mandela was regarded as a terrorist and jailed on Robben Island for his role as a leader of the then-outlawed African National Congress (ANC) and its armed wing the Umkhonto We Sizwe. He later achieved international recognition for his leadership as president in rebuilding the country's once segregationist society. The last chapters of the book describe his political ascension and his belief that the struggle still continued against apartheid in South Africa.

== Overview ==
In the first part of the autobiography, Mandela describes his upbringing as a child and adolescent in South Africa and being connected to the royal Thembu dynasty. His Xhosa birth name was Rolihlahla, which is loosely translated as "pulling the branch of a tree", or a euphemism for "troublemaker".

Mandela describes his education at a Thembu college called Clarkebury, and later at the strict Healdtown school. He mentions his education at the University of Fort Hare, and his practice of law later on. He also writes; "Democracy meant all men to be heard, and the decision was taken together as a people. Majority rule was a foreign notion. A minority was not to be clashed by a majority." (p. 29)

In the second part of the book, Mandela introduces political and social aspects of apartheid in South Africa, and the influences of politicians such as Daniel François Malan who implemented the nadir of African freedoms, as he officially commenced the apartheid policies. Mandela joined the African National Congress in 1950 and describes his organisation of guerrilla tactics and underground organisations to battle against apartheid.

In 1961, Mandela was convicted for inciting people to strike and leaving the country without a passport and sentenced to five years' imprisonment. However, Mandela was shortly thereafter sentenced to life imprisonment for sabotage in what was known as the "Rivonia Trial", by Justice Dr Quartus de Wet, instead of a possible death sentence. (p. 159)

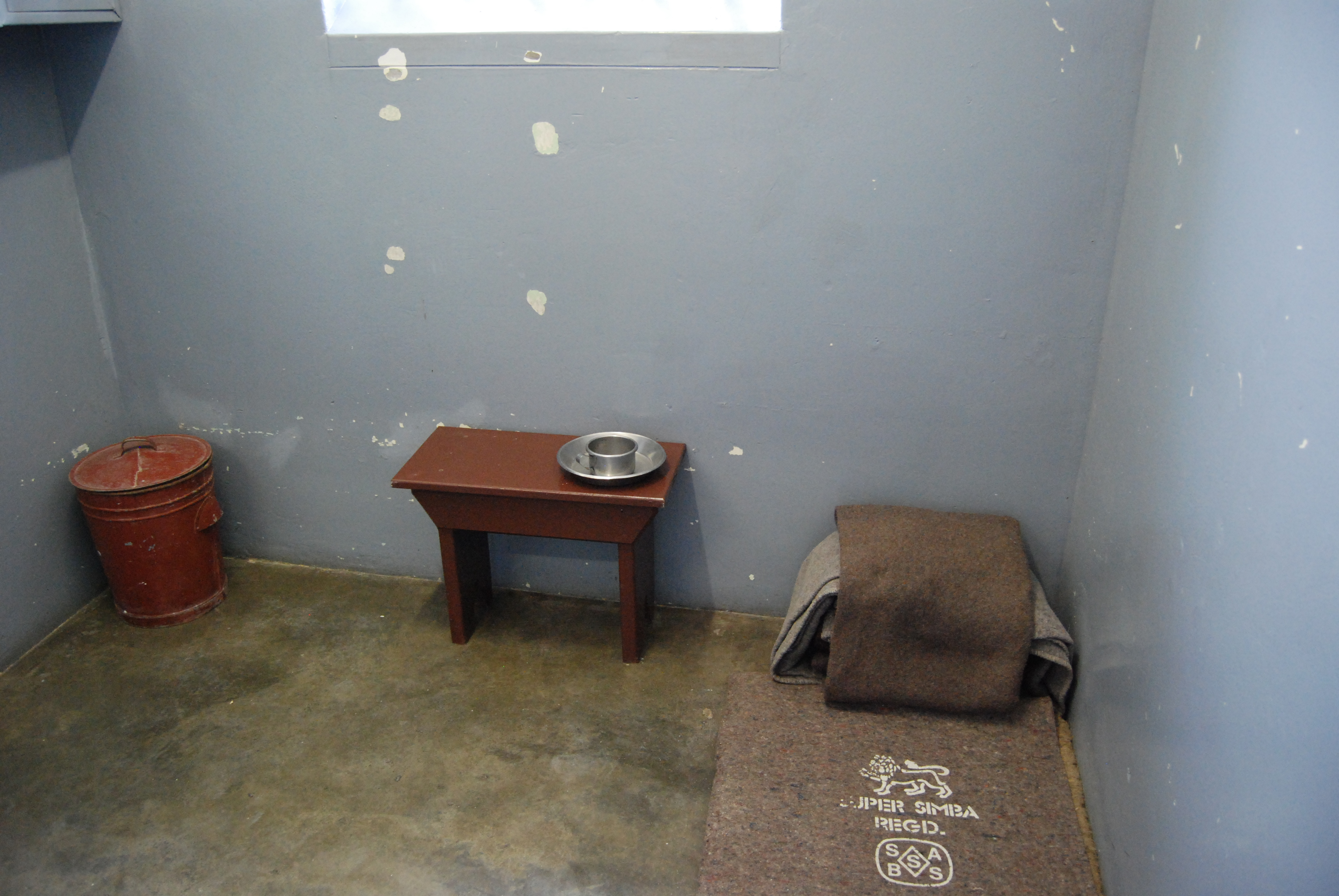
Nelson Mandela's prison cell on Robben Island

Mandela describes prison time on Robben Island and Pollsmoor Prison. His 28-year tenure in prison was marked by the cruelty of the English-speaking white and Afrikaner guards, backbreaking labour, and sleeping in minuscule cells which were nearly uninhabitable. Unlike his biographer Anthony Sampson, Mandela does not accuse the warder James Gregory of fabricating a friendship with his prisoner. Gregory's book Goodbye Bafana discussed Mandela's family life and described Gregory as a close personal friend of Mandela. According to Mandela: The Authorised Biography, Gregory's position was to censor the letters delivered to the future president, and he thereby discovered the details of Mandela's personal life, which he then made money from by means of his book Goodbye Bafana. Mandela considered suing Gregory for this breach of trust. In Long Walk to Freedom Mandela remarks of Gregory only that 'I had not known him terribly well, but he knew us, because he had been responsible for reviewing our incoming and outgoing mail.'

Later on in his sentence, Mandela met South African president, Frederik Willem de Klerk, and was released from prison in 1990. Unlike his friend Anthony Sampson's account, Mandela's book does not discuss the alleged complicity of de Klerk in the violence of the eighties and nineties, or the role of his ex-wife Winnie Mandela in that bloodshed. Mandela became the President of South Africa in 1994.

== Reception ==
The book won the Alan Paton Award in 1995 and has been published in many languages.

== Film adaptation ==
Long Walk to Freedom has been adapted into a film titled Mandela: Long Walk to Freedom directed by Justin Chadwick, written by William Nicholson, and produced by Anant Singh. Mandela personally awarded the film rights to the book to Singh's company some years before 2009. Singh believes that as the film is based on Mandela's writing, it will be the "definitive" biopic of him. English actor Idris Elba portrays Mandela in the film. The film was limited released on 29 November 2013 in the United States. The full release happened on Christmas Day 2013 in the United States. When the film was shown in London for Prince William and his wife, Nelson Mandela's death was announced.

== Ghost writer and second memoir ==
In an obituary of Mandela, The Times of London reported that the latter chapters of Long Walk to Freedom had been "ghosted by a skilful US journalist", and that Mandela had later started work on a second set of memoirs without a ghost writer.

A follow-up memoir was published in 2017, compiled by Mandla Langa from Mandela's handwritten notes and unfinished draft, together with archive material and with a prologue by Graça Machel: entitled Dare Not Linger: The Presidential Years, this volume took its title from the closing sentence of Long Walk to Freedom: "But I can only rest for a moment, for with freedom comes responsibilities, and I dare not linger, for my long walk is not ended."
