= Bheki W. J. Langa =

South African diplomat and administrator

Bheki Winston Joshua Langa
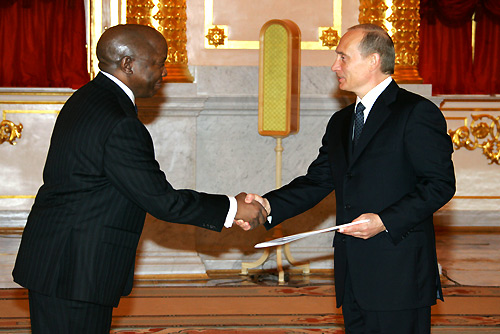

Former Head of the Domestic Branch of the State Security Agency (SSA)
- President: Jacob Zuma

Personal details
- Born: 1952 (age 73–74) Stanger, South Africa

Bheki Winston Joshua Langa (born in Stanger 1952) is a South African diplomat and administrator. He formerly served as Ambassador Extraordinary and Plenipotentiary of the Republic of South Africa to Russia from July 2005 to August 2010 and to China from September 2010 to December 2014. He also served as the head of the domestic branch of the State Security Agency (SSA) from August 2015 to March 2017. He is currently managing director of a music production company Econoculture Pty Ltd.

== Career ==
He served as South Africa's Ambassador to Russia from July 2005 until August 2010. He was then posted to China as the Ambassador Extraordinary and Plenipotentiary of the Republic of South Africa to China until 2015. In August 2015 he was appointed head of the domestic branch of the State Security Agency (SSA). and served in the Agency until March 2017. He is currently managing director of a music production company Econoculture Pty Ltd.

== Education and personal life ==
Bheki Winston Joshua Langa is the sixth child in a family of seven children. He is brother to the late school teacher Sam Langa, the late former Chief Justice of South Africa Pius Langa, the late political activist Ben Langa. His other siblings are Queen Miriam Langa, the writer Mandla Langa, and the late Thembi Grace Langa. His father was late Pastor Simon Petros Mbhekwa Langa, founder of the Christian Assemblies Church and his mother was the late Josephine Busisiwe Langa (born Ndaba). He went into exile in May 1976, worked in the scholarship section of the African National Congress (ANC) in Tanzania. In August 1977 he was sent by the ANC for studies in the Soviet Union, where he completed a master's degree in Industrial Economics (1982) and a PhD in economics (1987) at the Moscow Institute of National Economy named after Plekhanov. From 1987 to 1989 he worked as researcher in the ANC's Department of Economic Policy in Lusaka, Zambia. From September 1989 to May 1991 he pursued further studies in the United Kingdom, obtaining a Postgraduate Diploma in Quantitative Development Economics at the University of Warwick (1990) and a master's degree in economics (MSc) at the University of Manchester (1991)

== Notable comments ==
After the passing of Nelson Mandela in December 2013 Langa compared his country's late iconic figure to Mao Zedong, saying Mandela and Mao "were both very strong leaders who fought for the liberation of their people, and who also contributed to laying the foundation for further development in society."

When he served as the Ambassador Extraordinary and Plenipotentiary of the Republic of South Africa to China, Busisiwe Mkhwebane, the proposed new Public Protector, worked in the embassy. He has refuted claims that she served as a spy for the State Security Agency: "I can confirm without any fear of contradiction that advocate Busisiwe Mkhwebane was employed as counsellor for the department of home affairs at the South African embassy and was never in the employ, nor performed any assignment for, the State Security Agency throughout her period of service in China."
