= Deon Lotz =

South African actor (born 1964)

- Born: 20 July 1964 (age 61); Cape Town, South Africa
- Education: Drakensberg Boys Choir School
- Occupation: Actor
- Years active: 2003–present
- Known for: Beauty (Skoonheid), Sleeper's Wake, Mandela: Long Walk to Freedom
- Children: 2

Deon Lotz (born 20 July 1964) is a South African film, television, and theatre actor. He is perhaps best known internationally for roles in Mandela: Long Walk to Freedom and Beauty (Skoonheid). He has appeared in both English- and Afrikaans-language productions.

== Early life and career ==
Lotz was born 20 July 1964 in Cape Town. He sang for the Drakensberg Boys Choir in his teenage years. Lotz is the second youngest of four children, having an older brother and sister and a younger brother. Prior to becoming an actor, Lotz worked as a hotelier. Early in his career, Lotz acted in commercials. Today Lotz resides in Cape Town, working as a full-time actor in the Mother City, as well as travelling to Johannesburg for work. Lotz is known to have a son and a daughter.

== Film career ==
In 2011, he had the starring role in Beauty (Skoonheid), directed by Oliver Hermanus, which became South Africa's submission for Best Foreign Language Film for the 2011 Academy Awards. Beauty won the Queer Palm Award at the 2011 Cannes Film Festival and was the first Afrikaans-language film to be screened at Cannes. Lotz received the Best Actor award at the 2011 Zurich Film Festival for his performance in the film. In 2012, Lotz also was named Best Actor in a Feature Film for his role in Beauty at the South African Film and Television Awards.

Lotz played the role of Kobie Coetzee in the 2013 feature Mandela: Long Walk to Freedom.

Lotz won Best Supporting Male at the 2013 kykNET Silwerskermfees (Silver Screen Festival) for his role in the Afrikaans-language family film, Faan se Trein. He was nominated for a 2015 SAFTA award for Best Supporting Actor for this film. Other notable films Lotz has appeared in include Musiek vir die Agtergrond (2013), Winnie Mandela (2013), "Master Harold" . . . and the Boys (2010), and Proteus (2003).

== Television career ==
Lotz has starred in South African, European, and North American television productions, including The Book of Negroes (2015), Wallander (2015), When We Were Black (2014), and Flight of the Storks (2012). In 2016, Lotz received the SAFTA award for Best Supporting Actor - TV Drama for his role in When We Were Black.

== Theatre career ==
Lotz has appeared in a number of South African theatre productions, including Liefde, Anna with noted South African actress Sandra Prinsloo; an Afrikaans-language version of Anton Chekhov's The Seagull; and Moeder Moed en Haar Kinders, a translation of Bertolt Brecht's Mother Courage. Lotz won Best Supporting Actor awards for Die Seemeeu and Moeder Moed en Haar Kinders at the 2015 Klein Karoo Nasionale Kunstefees. The actor was nominated in 2008 for Best Actor for his role in the play Wrestlers at the Fleur du Cap Theatre Awards.

== Awards ==
- Nominee, Best Actor, Wrestlers, Fleur du Cap Theatre Awards, 2008
- Winner, Best Actor, Beauty, Zurich Film Festival, 2011
- Winner, Best Actor - Feature Film, Beauty, South African Film and Television Awards (SAFTA), 2012
- Winner, Best Supporting Actor, Faan se Trein, kykNET Silwerskeemfees, 2013
- Winner, Best Supporting Actor, Die Seemeeu, Klein Karoo Nasionale Kunstefees, 2015
- Winner, Best Supporting Actor, Moeder Moed en Haar Kinders, Klein Karoo Nasionale Kunstefees, 2015
- Nominee, Best Supporting Actor - Feature Film, Faan se Trein, South African Film and Television Awards (SAFTA), 2015
- Winner, Best Supporting Actor - TV Drama, When We Were Black, South African Film and Television Awards (SAFTA), 2016

== Filmography ==
=== Feature films ===
Year	Title	Role	Notes
2003	Consequence	Cop	
2003	Proteus	Governor	
2004	Blast	Pentagon CIA Representative	
2007	Anner House	Werner	TV movie
2007	The World Unseen	White Farmer	
2008	Hansie: A True Story	Rory Steyn	
2010	'Master Harold' ... And the Boys	Policeman	
2011	Skoonheid	François van Heerden	
2011	Roepman	Abram Rademan	
2011	Winnie Mandela	F.W. de Klerk	
2012	Sleeper's Wake	Roelf Venter	
2013	Verraaiers	Generaal Koos de la Rey	
2013	Mandela: Long Walk to Freedom	Kobie Coetzee	
2013	Four Corners	Supt. Adams	
2013	Musiek vir die Agtergrond	Louis	
2013	Cold Harbour	Col. Venske	
2014	Faan se trein	Dr. André Dippenaar	
2014	Kite	Detective Prinsloo	
2015	De(Con)Struction of Love		Short
2015	Recovery	Counsellor	Short
2015	French Toast	Izak le Roux	
2015	The Man with the Heavy Leg	Doctor	Short
2015	Destination		Short
2015	'n Paw-Paw Vir My Darling	Vleis Beeslaar	
2015	'n Man Soos My Pa	Kolonel Nieuwoudt	
2016	Shepherds and Butchers	Warrant Officer Rautenbach	
2016	Modder en Bloed	Maartens	
2016	Free State	Gideon Nolte	
2016	Dis Koue Kos, Skat	Bernard	
2016	Starry Night	Manager	Short
2016	Bypass	Dr. Wright	Post production
2017	The Blue Mauritius	Müller	Pre-production
2017	Hoener met die Rooi Skoene	Du Toit de Waal	Post production
2017	The Number		
2019	The Seagull (Die Seemeeu)	Elias	
2022	Gereza	Stellies	
2024	A Family Affair	David Howell	

== Television ==
Year	Title	Role	Notes
2005	Charlie Jade	Emergency worker #2	Episode: "Sand"
2012	Leonardo	Judge	Episode: "Perspective"
2013	Flight of the Storks	Otto Kiefer	Episode: "Part One: A Solo Journey"
2014	When We Were Black	Kobus Landman	Series regular, 6 episodes
2015	The Book of Negroes	New York Justice of the Peace	Episode: 4
2015	Wallander	Colonel Julian van Heerden	Episode: "The White Lioness"
2016	Cape Town	Prof. Philip Pagel	Episodes: "Relativity", "Way to Paradise", "Shallow End", "Echoes of the Past"
2016	Tutankhamun	Colonel	Episode: 2
2017	Dating Game Killer	Camp Director Lee	TV film
2019	Trackers	Diederick Brand	
