= Santana (film) =

2020 action fim

- Poster
- Directed by: Maradona Dias Dos Santos; Chris Roland
- Written by: Chris Roland; Maradona Dias Dos Santos
- Starring: Paulo Americano; Terence Bridgett; Amanda Brown
- Distributed by: Netflix
- Release date: 15 May 2020
- Running time: 106 minutes
- Country: Angola
- Language: English

Santana is a 2020 action film co-directed by Maradona Dias Dos Santos and Chris Roland. Co-written by Chris Roland and Maradona Dias Dos Santos, the film stars Paulo Americano, Terence Bridgett and Amanda Brown.

== Cast ==
- Paulo Americano as Dias
- Terence Bridgett
- Amanda Brown as Amanda Whiles
- Tamer Burjaq
- Nompilo Gwala
- Paul Hampshire
- Dale Jackson
- Hakeem Kae-Kazim as Obi
- Terri Lane
- Robin Minifie as Rambo
- Raul Rosario as Matias
- Rapulana Seiphemo as Ferreira
- Jenna Upton
- Neide Vieira
