= Ben Langa =

South African activist & poet

Benjamin Johnson Langa OLG was a South African activist, poet, and brother of Pius Langa, Bheki Langa, and Mandla Langa. Ben was assassinated in 1984 as part of the apartheid regime's destabilisation of the ANC; an Mkhonto WeSizwe (MK) commander who was also an apartheid agent instructed two operatives to kill Langa, saying that he had betrayed the movement. The operatives were later hanged for murder by the apartheid regime. Langa's killing and its aftermath have been used to illustrate the danger of accepting without due process accusations of treachery, and by implication, of organisations which enable or condone this.

Details of the killing are still disputed. There have been hints that former president of South Africa, Jacob Zuma, who was MK security chief in Swaziland (now eSwatini), was involved.

== Life and work ==
Ben Langa's parents lived in Stanger near Durban and later KwaMashu in Durban. They prioritised the education of their seven children, most of whom became politically active. Ben was elected General Secretary of SASO in 1973 while a student at the University of Fort Hare. He abandoned his studies due to police pressure and became a community activist. He resided in Pietermaritzburg at the time of his death.

== Poetic career ==
Ben's poetry is difficult to locate nowadays since many ephemeral publications of the 1970s and 80s have not been digitised. One poem, For My Brothers in Exile, is featured in an online educational site. Oral performances were important within the anti-apartheid movement, rooted in the indigenous tradition of izibongo ("praise poems").
