= Zikhona Mda =

South African actress and presenter

- Born: Zikhona Mda; 11 March; Cape Town, South Africa
- Occupations: Actress, Voice-over artist, Fashion designer, Scriptwriter, Production coordinator
- Years active: 2003–present
- Height: 1.65 m (5 ft 5 in)

Zikhona Mda (born 11 March) is a South African actress, voice-over artist, fashion designer and yoga instructor. She is best known for the roles in the films such as Goodbye Bafana, Vagrant Queen, and Amaza. She has also worked as a scriptwriter and production coordinator.

== Career ==
In 2004, she appeared in the fourth season of the SABC1 drama serial Interrogation Room with the role "Nthati" in an episode. In 2007, she joined with the SABC1 drama series Divers Down with the role "Buhle". In the same year, she acted in the blockbuster feature film Goodbye Bafana with the role "Zenani Mandela". In 2008, she acted in the third season of the e.tv sports drama serial Shooting Stars and played the role "Lehle". In 2009, she played the role "Zoliswa" in the SABC1 drama series Montana. She later reprised her role in the series due to its popularity.

In 2010, she starred in the BBC One police procedural serial Silent Witness in the thirteenth season by playing the role "Nyasha Mangidi" in two episodes. In 2014, she joined with the SABC1 drama series Amaza, where she played the supportive role "Thembi Kamva". Apart from that, she also made a cameo role in the two serials: Shooting Stars and Madam & Eve. She also performed in the stage plays such as; Herion Lies, The Real Inspector Hound, Who Killed The Real Biltong? and Mind Games. Meanwhile, she auditioned for both the 2012 and 2015 Presenter Search On 3 seasons and finally selected for "Top 10 Finalists" in 2018 season.

== Filmography ==
Year	Film	Role	Genre	Ref.
2004	Interrogation Room	Nthati	TV series	
2007	Divers Down	Buhle	TV series	
2007	Goodbye Bafana	Zenani Mandela-Dlamini	Film	
2008	Shooting Stars	Lehle	TV series	
2009	Montana	Zoliswa Yili	TV series	
2009	Liebe, Babys und der Zauber Afrikas	Dada	TV movie	
2010	Silent Witness	Nyasha Mangidi	TV series	
2014	Amaza	Thembi Kamva	TV series	
2015	Traffic!	Jezile	TV series	
2018	Ice	Female Blogger	TV series	
2020	Vagrant Queen	Bew	TV series	
