= Cuckold (film) =

2015 film

- Film poster
- Directed by: Charlie Vundla
- Written by: Charlie Vundla
- Starring: Terry Pheto
- Release date: 18 September 2015 (Toronto International Film Festival)
- Running time: 95 minutes
- Country: South Africa
- Languages: English; Zulu

Cuckold is a 2015 South African drama film directed by Charlie Vundla. It was screened in the Contemporary World Cinema section of the 2015 Toronto International Film Festival. It was also screened at the Pan African Film Festival, in its celebration of Black History Month.

== Cast ==
- Terry Pheto as Laura
- Louis Roux as Jon
- Charlie Vundla as Smanga
