= Beauty (2011 film) =

2011 film

- Theatrical release poster
- Directed by: Oliver Hermanus
- Written by: Didier Costet; Oliver Hermanus
- Produced by: Didier Costet
- Starring: Deon Lotz; Charlie Keegan
- Cinematography: Jamie Ramsay
- Edited by: George Hanmer
- Music by: Ben Ludik
- Release dates: 17 May 2011 (Cannes); 5 August 2011 (South Africa)
- Running time: 98 minutes
- Country: South Africa
- Languages: Afrikaans; English

Beauty (Afrikaans: Skoonheid) is a 2011 South African psychological drama co-written and directed by Oliver Hermanus. It premiered in the Un Certain Regard section at the 2011 Cannes Film Festival. The film was selected as the South African entry for the Best Foreign Language Film at the 84th Academy Awards, but it did not make the final shortlist.

== Plot ==
François van Heerden (Deon Lotz), is a white man in his late forties who lives in Bloemfontein in South Africa. Married with two grown daughters, he runs his own timber business and leads a seemingly comfortable life. He is also openly racist and homophobic, but at the same time he is sexually attracted to other men and regularly has secret sexual encounters with other white closeted men.

At his daughter's wedding reception, he encounters Christian Roodt (Charlie Keegan), the handsome young son of old family friends who live in Cape Town. Christian is studying law at university while also enjoying a budding side career as a model, appearing in television commercials. François becomes infatuated with Christian, learning everything he can about him. When François' other daughter Anika later starts dating Christian, François becomes jealous and contrives a way to punish her.

During a visit to his doctor for an examination, it becomes clear that François is suffering from psychological problems that are affecting his health, no doubt partly related to his inability to come to terms with his sexuality.

After telling his wife he needs to go to Cape Town on business for a few days, François goes to visit the Roodts so that he can be around Christian. When Christian is not there, he asks for Christian's phone number under the pretext of discussing a legal matter with him. Later, after getting drunk in a gay bar in the city, François calls Christian and asks him to come and collect him. Christian obliges and the two have a meal. François is thrilled at the chance to be alone with him, and later invites him back to his hotel room for a drink. Once there, Christian takes the opportunity to ask François if he would invest in his plan to start his own business. Suspecting that Christian may not actually be interested in him but only his money, François clumsily attempts to kiss him but is gently rebuffed. After a few moments, François erupts into a violent rage and assaults and rapes Christian.

Days later, back at home, François asks Anika if she is still seeing Christian but she says she hasn't heard from him in a while. François quietly continues with his life as usual, seemingly unrepentant. One day, he goes for lunch, and spots two men in a relationship. They laugh and kiss in the distance, as François looks at them, clearly distressed and lonely.

== Cast ==
- Deon Lotz as François van Heerden
- Roeline Daneel as Anika van Heerden
- Sue Diepeveen as Marika Roodt
- Charlie Keegan as Christian Roodt
- Albert Maritz as Willem Roodt
- Michelle Scott as Elena van Heerden

== Critical reception ==
The film received positive reviews from critics. Review aggregator Rotten Tomatoes reports that 84% of professional critics gave the film a positive review, with a rating average of 6.9/10. The majority of critics praised Deon Lotz's performance, Peter Bradshaw from ''The Guardian called it "A ferociously powerful, yet subtle and complex performance" and said it gave the film "a tragic dimension". David Parkinson from Empire Magazine also praised Lotz, and in his three out of five stars review summarized his verdict as "Despite that title, there's an ugly power to this study of obsession and anger."

== Awards ==
Beauty was awarded the Queer Palm Award at the 2011 Cannes Film Festival. Actor Deon Lotz received a special mention in the 2011 Zurich Film Festival for his performance in the film.

== See also ==
- List of submissions to the 84th Academy Awards for Best Foreign Language Film
- List of South African submissions for the Academy Award for Best Foreign Language Film
