= Mandla Langa =

South African writer (born 1950)

- Born: 1950 (age 75–76); Stanger, Durban, South Africa
- Education: University of Fort Hare
- Occupations: Writer and cultural activist
- Relatives: Pius Langa (brother); Bheki Langa (brother); Ben Langa (brother).
- Writing career
- Notable work: The Lost Colours of the Chameleon (2008) The Memory of Stories (2000)
- Notable awards: 2009 Commonwealth Writer's Prize 1991 Arts Council of Great Britain’s Bursary for Creative Writing

Mandla Langa (born 1950 in Stanger, Durban) is a South African poet, short-story writer, novelist, and cultural activist. He grew up in the KwaMashu township of Kwazulu Natal. His novel The Lost Colours of the Chameleon won the 2009 Commonwealth Writers' Prize (Africa region). Langa enrolled for a degree in English and Philosophy at the University of Fort Hare, but was expelled in 1973 as a result of his involvement in the activities of the South African Student Organisation. In 1976, he went into exile and has lived in different countries of Southern Africa as well as in Hungary and the United Kingdom.

Langa was brought in to complete the second volume of Nelson Mandela's autobiography, left in an unfinished draft when Mandela died in 2013, and published in 2017 as Dare Not Linger: The Presidential Years.

In 2022, Langa was appointed High Commissioner of the Republic of South Africa to Cameroon.

== Early life and education ==
Mandla Langa was born in Stanger, Durban, South Africa, in 1950 and grew up in the KwaMashu township 20 miles north of Durban, during the implementation of the apartheid system. He is one of nine children. His brother Pius Langa served as Chief Justice in South Africa. Another brother, Bheki Langa, served as South Africa's ambassador to Russia and China. Mandla Langa attended Gardner Memorial School, Sibonelo High School in Durban, and then the University of Fort Hare. He taught at a high school in KwaMashu in 1973–74.

In 1974, he became actively involved as a director of the South African Students' Organisation (SASO), maintaining this position until his arrest in 1976 for attempting to leave the country without a permit. As a result he served 101 days in jail. According to Charles Larson (editor of Under African Skies), Langa himself said that his arrest was due to sedition.

While imprisoned, Langa continued to improve his writing skills. After serving his sentence, he fled to Botswana, marking the start of his life in exile. He also spent time in Lesotho, Angola, where he participated in military training in the camps of MK, also known as Umkhonto we Sizwe. In addition to Lesotho, Langa spent time in Mozambique, Zambia, Hungary and the UK. He held various ANC posts abroad, including deputy chief representative of the ANC and its cultural attaché in the UK and Western Europe.

== Career ==
=== Literary work ===
Among Langa’s early published work are poems such as "Pension Jives" and "They No Longer Speak to Us in Song". In addition to poetry, he began writing prose. His story "The Dead Men Who Lost Their Bones" was his first to be published in Drum Magazine in 1980, winning a prize. Langa's success prompted his literary evolution to novel writing. In 1991, he became the first South African to be awarded an Arts Council of Great Britain Bursary for Creative Writing. Langa's diverse work includes penning an opera, Milestones, with music composed by jazz musician Hugh Masekela. In 1999, Milestones was featured at the Standard Bank Festival in Grahamstown.

His published books are Tenderness of Blood (1987), A Rainbow on a Paper Sky (1989), The Naked Song and Other Stories (1997), The Memory of Stones (2000), and The Lost Colours of the Chameleon (2008), which won the 2009 Commonwealth Writers Prize (Best Book in Africa). Head judge Elinor Sisulu said: "Langa deconstructs the inner workings of a mythical African state, laying bare the frailties of leaders too blinded by power to effectively confront the major challenges of their times." . Langa appeared at the 2011 Paris Book Fair. He also be participated in the Bush Theatre's 2011 project Sixty-Six Books with a piece based upon a book of the King James Bible.

Langa was brought in to complete the follow-up volume to Nelson Mandela's 1994 autobiography Long Walk to Freedom. Based on Mandela's handwritten notes and a draft left unfinished when Mandela died in 2013, as well as archive material and interviews, Dare Not Linger: The Presidential Years by Nelson Mandela and Mandla Langa, with a prologue by Graça Machel, was published in 2017, its title taken from the closing sentence of Long Walk to Freedom: "But I can only rest for a moment, for with freedom comes responsibilities, and I dare not linger, for my long walk is not ended."

=== Administrative positions ===
- Cultural Representative of the African National Congress (ANC)
- July 2001–05: Chairperson of the first council of the Independent Communications Authority of South Africa (ICASA) – (merging of the IBA and the South African Telecommunications Regulatory Authority - SARRA)
- Chairman of Board at MultiChoice South Africa

Currently Langa is serving on the following boards:

- Business and Arts South Africa (BASA)
- Foundation for Global Dialogue (FGD)
- Institute for the Advancement of Journalism (IAJ)
- The Rhodes University School for Economic Journalism
- Trustee of the Nation's Trust
- Trustee of the Read Educational Trust
- Trustee of the South African Screen Writers' Laboratory (SCRAWL)
- Director of Contemporary African Music and Arts (CAMA)

=== Media positions ===
- April 1999 – June 2000: Chairperson of the Independent Broadcasting Authority
- Langa served as a columnist for the Sunday Independent
- Vice-Chairperson of the successful Africa '95 exhibition season in London.
- Served on the board of the South African Broadcasting Corporation (SABC) after his position as program director
- Editor-at-large of Leadership Magazine

== Personal life ==
Langa has two daughters with his wife June Josephs. He has two brothers, Pius Langa who served as South African Chief justice and Bheki W. J. Langa who is a diplomat.

== Awards and honours ==
In 2007, Langa received South Africa’s National Order of Ikhamanga (Silver) for literary, journalistic and cultural achievements, the citation specifying his "excellent contribution to the struggle against apartheid, achievements in the field of literature and journalism and contributing to post-apartheid South Africa through serving in different institutions". In February 2003, the Pan African Writers' Association (PAWA) featured Langa in an event promoting him as a distinguished South African writer: "An Evening with Mandla Langa".

== Works ==
=== Fiction ===
- The Lost Colours of the Chameleon. Picador Africa, 2008, ISBN 978-1-77010-084-8
- The Memory of Stones. New Africa Books. 2000. ISBN 978-0-86486-408-6. – a collection exploring the nature of South African society after the end of apartheid
- The Naked Song and Other Stories. New Africa Books. 1996. ISBN 978-0-86486-313-3.
- A Rainbow on the Paper Sky. Kliptown Books, 1989
- Tenderness of Blood. Zimbabwe Publishing House, 1987, ISBN 978-0-949225-30-6

=== Non-fiction ===
- With Nelson Mandela, Dare Not Linger: The Presidential Years, Macmillan, 2017, ISBN 978-1509809592

=== Collaborative works ===
- 2006: Youth 2 Youth: 30 Years after Soweto ’76 (Introduction by Mandla Langa, edited by George Hallett)
- 2004: Moving in Time: Images of Life in a Democratic South Africa (Introduction by Mandla Langa, edited by George Hallett)
- 2004: South Africa's Nobel Laureates: Peace, Literature and Science by Kader Asmal, David Chidester, and Wilmot Godfrey James (Introduction by Mandla Langa)

=== Collections ===
- 2004: Kader Asmal, David Chidester, and Wilmot Godfrey James (eds), South Africa's Nobel Laureates: Peace, Literature and Science — Introduction by Mandla Langa. Jonathan Ball Publishers, South Africa.
- 1997: Charles R. Larson (ed.), Under African Skies: Modern African Stories. Farrar, Straus & Giroux; paperback Canongate Books, 2005.
- 1990: Elisa Segrave (ed.), Junky's Christmas, and other Yuletide Stories. Serpent's Tail.
- 1990: Sarah LeFanu and Stephen Hayward (eds), Colours of a New Day: Writing for South Africa. Lawrence & Wishart.

=== Other ===
- Milestones – musical opera in collaboration with the jazz musician Hugh Masekela
