= Pius Langa =

South African lawyer and judge (1939–2013)

Pius Langa SCOB
- Langa in December 2011

Chief Justice of South Africa
- In office 1 June 2005 – 11 October 2009
- Appointed by: Thabo Mbeki
- Deputy: Dikgang Moseneke
- Preceded by: Arthur Chaskalson
- Succeeded by: Sandile Ngcobo

Deputy Chief Justice of South Africa
- In office November 2001 – 31 May 2005
- Appointed by: Thabo Mbeki
- Preceded by: Hennie van Heerden
- Succeeded by: Dikgang Moseneke

Deputy President of the Constitutional Court
- In office August 1997 – November 2001
- Appointed by: Nelson Mandela
- Preceded by: Ismail Mahomed
- Succeeded by: Himself (as Deputy Chief Justice)

Justice of the Constitutional Court
- In office 14 February 1995 – 11 October 2009
- Appointed by: Nelson Mandela
- Preceded by: Court established

Personal details
- Born: Pius Nkonzo Langa; 25 March 1939 Bushbuckridge, Transvaal; Union of South Africa
- Died: 24 July 2013 (aged 74) Johannesburg, Gauteng; Republic of South Africa
- Spouse: Beauty Langa (m. 1966; died 2009)
- Relations: Bheki Langa (brother); Mandla Langa (brother); Ben Langa (brother)
- Education: Adams College
- Alma mater: University of South Africa

Pius Nkonzo Langa SCOB (25 March 1939 – 24 July 2013) was Chief Justice of South Africa from June 2005 to October 2009. Formerly a human rights lawyer, he was appointed as a puisne judge of the Constitutional Court of South Africa upon its inception in 1995. He was the Deputy Chief Justice of South Africa from November 2001 until May 2005, when President Thabo Mbeki elevated him to the Chief Justiceship. He was South Africa's first black African Chief Justice.

The son of a Zulu pastor, Langa left school as a teenager to enter the workforce. Over the next two decades, he studied for his matric certificate while working in a clothing factory and then studied for his legal qualifications while working as a civil servant in the Department of Justice. He left the civil service at the rank of magistrate in 1977, when he was admitted as an advocate. Thereafter he practised law in Durban, specialising in the defence of anti-apartheid activists accused of political offences. He was a member of the United Democratic Front and the president of the National Association of Democratic Lawyers from 1988 to 1994. During the same period, he attended the negotiations to end apartheid as a member of the Constitutional Committee of the African National Congress.

Shortly after he took silk in January 1994, Langa was appointed to the newly established Constitutional Court by post-apartheid President Nelson Mandela. In August 1997, Mandela additionally appointed him as the court's second Deputy President; his title was changed to Deputy Chief Justice after the Sixth Constitutional Amendment was passed in November 2001. On 1 June 2005, he succeeded Arthur Chaskalson as Chief Justice, a position which he held until his mandatory retirement in October 2009.

Leading the court during a period of political turmoil, Langa was widely respected for his mild and conciliatory manner, though he was also subject to criticism from both populist and conservative quarters. In particular, he is remembered for leading the court in lodging a controversial misconduct complaint against Judge John Hlophe, who was accused of attempting to interfere with the Constitutional Court's judgment in the politically sensitive matter of Thint v National Director of Public Prosecutions.

== Early life and education ==
Langa was born on 25 March 1939 in Bushbuckridge in the former Transvaal Province. He was the second of seven siblings, with four brothers and two sisters. Their father, Simon Peter Langa, was a Zulu-speaking charismatic preacher from Natal, whose work for the Pentecostal Holiness Church had brought the family to Bushbuckridge temporarily. Their mother was Swazi, and, because their father's work required frequent travel, Langa learned several other South African languages as a child. The family left Bushbuckridge during his infancy and spent several years in various parts of the Northern Transvaal, primarily in Pietersburg, until in 1949 they settled in Stanger, Natal.

Langa attended primary school in Stanger and then completed two years of secondary education, in 1954 and 1955, at Adams College in Amanzimtoti. He later called his sojourn at Adams College "one of the earliest miracles in my life": his parents could not afford to pay for his secondary education, but he received a bursary to attend the college, where his elder brother, Sam, was a trainee teacher. At the end of 1955, then aged 16, he left school with a first-class junior certificate to find a job in the urban centre of Durban.

== Early career: 1956–1977 ==
=== Clothing factory ===
Langa spent 1956 unemployed in Durban, looking for work and "struggling" with government administrators over their application of the pass laws: because his dompas recorded his home district as Bushbuckridge, he was not allowed to live in Natal while unemployed. He was deeply affected by this early experience of the "ugliness" of apartheid, later writing in a submission to the Truth and Reconciliation Commission that, "In that first flush of youth, I had thought I could do anything, aspire to anything and that nothing could stop me. I was wrong."

Though he had initially hoped to find a clerical job, Langa was finally employed at a clothing factory in early 1957. The factory made shirts and he was tasked with distributing textiles among the machinists. In his spare time, he studied independently for his matric exams, which he passed at the end of 1960.

=== Civil service ===
After matriculating, Langa joined the Department of Justice in a low-level position, serving as a court interpreter and messenger. Over the next 17 years, he worked continuously in a series of magistrate's courts across Natal, beginning with nine months in rural Impendle, then several years in Harding, and then stints in Camperdown, Howick, Stanger, and Ndwedwe. During his early years as an interpreter and clerk, he developed "a growing love for law as a means of solving at least some of the problems that confronted our people", and he became convinced that a legal education was a prerequisite to influencing the justice system.

In 1970, he enrolled in a part-time correspondence program at the University of South Africa, and he graduated with a BJuris in 1973 and an LLB in 1976. At the same time, with his BJuris degree, he rose through the ranks of the magistrate's offices, becoming a prosecutor and then a magistrate.

=== Family life ===
During the same period, Langa occasionally spent time at his family home in KwaMashu, a township outside Durban. His three younger brothers were all active in the student anti-apartheid movement, and in the mid-1970s, during the era of the Soweto uprising, the house became "a hotbed" for their activist activities and sometimes for Special Branch raids. Because his brothers and their friends were adherents of Black Consciousness politics, while he was attracted to the non-racialism of the rival Charterist faction, Langa "regarded it as my function to debate with them" about politics.

Langa's father died in 1972 and his mother in 1984. Two of his younger brothers, Bheki and Mandla, left South Africa for exile in the aftermath of the Soweto uprising; they ultimately became a diplomat and a novelist respectively. The third, Ben, was assassinated in 1984 by his comrades in the African National Congress (ANC), who wrongly believed that he had become a police informant. According to Mark Gevisser, Langa's moral opposition to capital punishment was such that he called publicly for the killers to be spared the death penalty, though they were hanged anyway.

== Legal practice: 1977–1994 ==
After completing his LLB, Langa left the civil service and returned to Durban, where he was admitted as an advocate of the Supreme Court of South Africa in June 1977. He practised at the Natal Bar for the next 17 years, with a varied practice but an overwhelming focus on political trials brought under apartheid legislation. While he was junior counsel, he was frequently briefed by his close friend Griffiths Mxenge, and he worked under silks including George Bizos and Ismail Mahomed; he and Dikgang Moseneke were Bizos's junior counsel in 1991 when Bizos defended Winnie Madikizela-Mandela against the charge of kidnapping Stompie Seipei. Langa's other activist clients included Patrick Maqubela, Jeff Radebe, Penuell Maduna, Nceba Faku, and Tony Yengeni, whom he defended against charges ranging from public violence to sabotage, treason, and murder. He also represented various civic bodies and trade unions.

Although Langa "kept a professional distance from the ANC", which was banned at the time, he was personally involved in various offshoots of the anti-apartheid movement. Among other things, he was a member of the executive committee of the Democratic Lawyers Association, an affiliate of the International Association of Democratic Lawyers, and then became a founding member of its successor organisation, the National Association of Democratic Lawyers (NADEL). He served as NADEL's national president from 1988 to 1994. In addition, he was a longstanding member of the United Democratic Front, having attended the launch of the front in Mitchells Plain in August 1983.

By the late 1980s, Langa was a member of the ANC's Constitutional Committee, which was preparing to negotiate a constitutional dispensation for post-apartheid South Africa. In this capacity, he worked on the party's draft bill of rights, which was ultimately incorporated into Chapter Two of the Constitution of South Africa. He also represented the ANC at the negotiations to end apartheid, both during pre-negotiations at Groote Schuur and Pretoria and during formal multi-party talks at the Convention for a Democratic South Africa and Multi-Party Negotiating Forum. After the National Peace Accord was signed, he was appointed to the Police Board, which was tasked with overseeing the South African Police's conduct during the political transition. During the same period, in January 1994, he was appointed as Senior Counsel.

== Constitutional Court: 1995–2009 ==
The Constitutional Court of South Africa, where Langa worked from February 1995 to October 2009

After the first post-apartheid elections of April 1994, newly elected President Nelson Mandela appointed Langa to the inaugural bench of the Constitutional Court of South Africa, which was newly established under the Interim Constitution. The bench was sworn in on 14 February 1995.

=== Deputy Chief Justice ===
In August 1997, President Mandela appointed Langa to succeed Ismail Mohamed as the Deputy President of the Constitutional Court, in which capacity he deputised Justice President Arthur Chaskalson. He held that position until November 2001, when, under the restructuring of the judiciary occasioned by the Sixth Amendment of the Constitution of South Africa, he and Chaskalson became Deputy Chief Justice and Chief Justice respectively. According to Justice Johann Kriegler, Langa worked closely with Chaskalson as his "understudy".

=== Chief Justice ===
==== Nomination ====
As Chaskalson's retirement approached, many observers believed it was a foregone conclusion that Justice Dikgang Moseneke (Langa's former colleague at the Bar) would succeed Chaskalson as Chief Justice. However, Langa was also viewed as a frontrunner. Because Chaskalson took leave in late 2004, he was already serving as Acting Chief Justice, and some members of the governing ANC, including Justice Minister Penuell Maduna (Langa's former client) and Deputy Justice Minister Johnny de Lange, apparently preferred Langa's Charterist political background to Moseneke's Black Consciousness history.

In March 2005, President Thabo Mbeki announced that Langa was his preferred candidate for the Chief Justice post. In his interview with the Judicial Service Commission in Cape Town the following month, Langa was asked about racism and demographic transformation in the judiciary; he dismissed reports that he had a "gradualist" approach to demographic transformation, instead describing his approach as "revolutionary". The Democratic Alliance, the official opposition, announced after the interview that it would support Langa's appointment. The appointment was confirmed by Mbeki and he took office as Chief Justice on 1 June 2005, with Moseneke as his deputy.

==== Hlophe controversies ====
Early in his career as Chief Justice, Langa was tasked with mediating the resolution of a major spat in the Cape Division of the High Court of South Africa, where Judge President John Hlophe had come into conflict with several of his colleagues after accusing them of racism. Three years later, Hlophe was at the centre of an even larger controversy when Langa, on behalf of the full Constitutional Court bench, laid a complaint against him with the Judicial Service Commission, alleging that he had attempted improperly to influence the justices' opinion in the Constitutional Court matter of Thint v National Director of Public Prosecutions. Thint was a politically sensitive case, involving the search and seizure of the belongings of former Deputy President Jacob Zuma; Langa ultimately wrote on behalf of a majority of the court in finding against Zuma.

As the Judicial Service Commission considered the complaint against Hlophe in subsequent months, Hlophe strongly attacked Langa and Moseneke, accusing them of waging a political campaign against him on behalf of Zuma's opponents. Although Langa categorically denied this allegation, he was thereafter "regarded with intense suspicion" by some of Hlophe and Zuma's supporters. In August 2009, Hlophe reportedly told the Mail & Guardian that he had recently refused to shake Langa's hand, saying, "I am not going to shake a white man's hand."

==== Legacy ====
Like Graeme Pollock, who seemed to have more time to play his shots than did mere mortals, Pius Langa has the gift of doing everything with deliberation. He is a singularly measured person, never visibly flustered, the Kiplingesque man who doesn't lose his head. He always seems to have time for reflection... In the seemingly interminable readthroughs at the Constitutional Court, when each word, comma and quotation in a draft judgment is debated in full conference, Langa frequently came up with the unanimously acceptable proposal and his own judgments demonstrate how carefully he chooses his words.

— Retired Justice Johann Kriegler in August 2005

In mid-2008, in a report strongly denied by the Judicial Service Commission, the Times reported that the Constitutional Court was in "such a shambles" that it was having difficulty attracting candidates to fill Tholie Madala's judicial seat, partly because of the perception that Langa was a weak leader and unable to defend the judiciary against recent political criticism. His critics said that he "lacked the hard edge" necessary for judicial leadership and that he had allowed politicians to become too powerful in the Judicial Service Commission, which he chaired.

However, Langa was generally admired for his tolerance of dissent in the Constitutional Court and Judicial Service Commission, as well as for his "ability to calm troubled waters without raising his voice or taking the offensive". In one description, "Langa's calm demeanour is deceptive. Behind it lies the resolve and moral purpose of a preacher's son." In another, he was "softly spoken, with a quiet dignity and seriousness of purpose," and "led by moral example rather than by power of intellectual persuasion – which is not to say that he was not persuasive, only that he persuaded in other ways". The Sunday Times called him "a conciliator in the same mould as Nelson Mandela". Langa himself said that his foremost priority as Chief Justice was the stability of the judiciary.

The Council for the Advancement of the South African Constitution reflected in 2021 that Langa had led the court "courageously" through "a period of change". Thint was one of a series of cases heard by the Langa court which emanated from the corruption prosecution of Deputy President Zuma and his associate Schabir Shaik, or from broader challenges to the status of the National Prosecuting Authority. Partly because these "lawfare" cases were often accompanied by populist political attacks on the judiciary, the Langa court operated in difficult political conditions; its dissent rate also increased significantly during Langa's tenure. In large part Langa was viewed as handling these tensions astutely. He was also involved in the early stages of establishing the independent Office of the Chief Justice, rather than the Department of Justice, as the hub of the administration of the courts.

=== Jurisprudence ===
Langa's first majority judgment in the Constitutional Court was S v Williams, a 1995 matter which outlawed judicial corporal punishment of juveniles. He also handed down judgment, three years later, in the related matter of Christian Education South Africa v Minister of Education, in which the court dismissed a challenge to a statutory prohibition against corporal punishment in schools. In other human rights matters, he wrote for the court in De Reuck v Director of Public Prosecutions, Witwatersrand Local Division, on child pornography, and in MEC for Education, KwaZulu-Natal v Pillay, on freedom of cultural expression in public schools; the latter also marked the first time that the Constitutional Court considered discrimination as defined by the Promotion of Equality and Prevention of Unfair Discrimination Act. Other notable Constitutional Court judgments written by Langa included several in criminal procedure, including Thint, Investigating Directorate: SEO v Hyundai Motors, and Zealand v Minister of Justice. He was also noted for his dissenting opinion in Masiya v Director of Public Prosecutions, Pretoria.

Academic Theunis Roux admired Langa's majority judgments in Thint and Glenister v President for "taking the political heat" out of sensitive matters without resorting to "a veil of legalism". However, some commentators criticised his synthesis of the Bill of Rights and customary law in Bhe v Magistrate, Khayelitsha, a landmark case on male primogeniture. Extra-curially, he expressed ambivalence towards demands for the "Africanisation" of law, saying, "We are in Africa, we are all very much African. But we happen to be in South Africa and we have a purely South African Constitution."

The test of our commitment to a culture of rights lies in our ability to respect the rights not only of the weakest, but also of the worst among us... Implicit in the provisions and tone of the Constitution are values of a more mature society, which relies on moral persuasion rather than force; on example rather than coercion... Those who are inclined to kill need to be told why it is wrong. The reason surely must be the principle that the value of human life is inestimable, and it is a value which the State must uphold by example as well.

— Langa's opinion in S v Makwanyane on the abolition of capital punishment, June 1995

=== International service ===
In 1998, the Southern African Development Community appointed Langa to chair an inquiry into that year's disputed elections in Lesotho, and in 2000, Don McKinnon appointed him as the Commonwealth of Nations's Special Envoy to Fiji in the aftermath of the Fijian coup. In later years, he led a delegation of the International Bar Association on a review of criminal procedure in Cameroon, and he was a member of the Permanent Court of Arbitration at the Hague. He also remained involved in the Commonwealth's work on democracy and constitutionalism, participating in constitutional review commissions in Sri Lanka, Rwanda, and Tanzania and serving as a member of the Judicial Integrity Group which drafted the Bangalore Principles of Judicial Conduct; he joked in 2005 that the Commonwealth "seem[ed] to consider my work with the Constitutional Court as spare time".

== Retirement and death: 2009–2013 ==
Langa retired from the judiciary on 11 October 2009 alongside Justices Yvonne Mokgoro, Kate O'Regan, and Albie Sachs; each had served their full term in the Constitutional Court. Justice Sandile Ngcobo was appointed to succeed Langa as Chief Justice.

Langa's most notable public role in his retirement was as chairman of the Press Freedom Commission, which was mandated by Print Media South Africa and the South African National Editors' Forum to conduct an inquiry into the regulation of the press between July 2011 and April 2012.

Langa was admitted to hospital in Durban in April 2013. He returned to hospital in June and died on 24 July 2013 at the Milpark Hospital in Johannesburg. He was granted a special official funeral, which was held on 3 August at Durban City Hall; it was televised and featured a speech by Jacob Zuma, who by then was the President of South Africa.

== Honours and awards ==
Among other honours, Langa received the Gruber Foundation's 2004 Prize for Justice, awarded jointly to him and Chief Justice Chaskalson, and the General Council of the Bar's 2006 Sydney and Felicia Kentridge Award for service to law in Southern Africa. In April 2008, President Mbeki inducted him into the Order of the Baobab, Gold for "his exceptional service in law, constitutional jurisprudence and human rights".

He was appointed as an honorary professor in procedural and clinic law at the University of Natal in June 1998, and he served for several years as a distinguished visiting professor at the Southern Methodist University in Dallas, Texas. He was the chancellor of the University of Natal from 1998 to 2004 and the first chancellor of the Nelson Mandela Metropolitan University from 2006 to 2010. He also received honorary doctorates from the University of South Africa, University of Zululand, University of the Western Cape, University of Cape Town, Rhodes University, Yale University, National University of Ireland, and Northeastern University, among others. The Pius Langa School of Advocacy, the Pan African Bar Association of South Africa's advocacy training institute in Sandton, is named in his honour.

== Personal life ==
In 1966, he married Thandekile Beauty Langa (née Mncwabe). Born in 1944 in Pietermaritzburg, Mncwabe was a nurse by training. After a long illness with Parkinson's disease, she died in hospital on 30 August 2009, shortly before Langa's retirement. The couple had six children, four sons and two daughters; their eldest son, Vusi, died in a car accident in 2004.

While serving as Chief Justice, Langa himself was briefly hospitalised after a car accident near his home in Houghton, Johannesburg in March 2007.

Legal offices
Preceded by Arthur Chaskalson	Chief Justice of South Africa; 2005–2009	Succeeded by Sandile Ngcobo
Preceded by Office established	Deputy Chief Justice of South Africa; 2001–2005	Succeeded by Dikgang Moseneke
