= Fana Mokoena =

South African actor and politician

Member of the National Assembly of South Africa
- In office 24 August 2016 – 16 October 2024

Delegate of the National Council of Provinces
- In office 22 May 2014 – 24 August 2016

Personal details
- Born: 13 May 1971 (age 55) Kroonstad, Orange Free State, South Africa
- Party: Economic Freedom Fighters (2013–2024)
- Other political affiliations: African National Congress (former)
- Children: 1
- Education: University of Cape Town
- Profession: Actor; Activist

Fana Mokoena (born 13 May 1971) is a South African actor and political activist, he served as a Member of Parliament, first as a delegate to the National Council of Provinces representing his home province Free State from May 2014 until August 2016; then later as a full member of the National Assembly of South Africa between August 2016 and October 2020 when he resigned. He was however back in parliament in 2024 after the National and Provincial Elections. Mokoena is a founding member of the Economic Freedom Fighters party and served on the party's central command team.

== Early life and education ==
Fana Mokoena was born on 13 May 1971 in Kroonstad, Free State, South Africa. He was raised in Kroonstad and later schooled in Johannesburg by his mother and stepfather, along with his three siblings. His last three years of high school were spent at Woodmead School, which was the first fully multi-racial school in the country, where his love of the arts began. He studied Theatre and Performance at the University of Cape Town and later qualified in Media Studies.

== Acting career ==
He started his acting career as a full member of the Playhouse Theatre company in 1993, and in 1994 he made his television debut in the South African TV film The Line. Mokoena played a small role in the thriller Dangerous Ground in 1997. In 1999 played Thula in the popular South African television drama series Yizo Yizo. In 2004, he portrayed the Rwandan general Augustin Bizimungu in the film Hotel Rwanda. In 2006, he played the role of Jaws Bengu in the South African series The LAB, a role which he played until 2009. In 2008, he appeared in a small role in the series Silent Witness. He played the role of Capt. James Sikobi in the South African drama A Small Town Called Descent in 2010. In 2011, he appeared in the action biography film adaptation of Machine Gun Preacher in the role of John Garang alongside Gerard Butler.

In 2012, he played a small role in the thriller Safe House with Denzel Washington. Mokoena appeared alongside Brad Pitt in the role of Thierry Umutoni in the zombie blockbuster World War Z in 2013. He also portrayed the anti-apartheid fighter Govan Mbeki in the film Mandela: Long Walk to Freedom with Idris Elba.

== Accolades and awards ==
Mokoena has received several accolades in the entertainment industry, both in his home country and internationally, including Best Actor Award at the South African Film and Television Awards SAFTA for his role in The LAB; and Best Actor in Supporting Role at the African Movie Academy Awards AMAA in Lagos, Nigeria for his role in Man On Ground

== Personal life ==
In 1976 Fana Mokoena's mother, Mekodi Arcillia Mokoena was detained and held in solitary confinement by the Apartheid regime for political activism She was incarcerated for inciting a student protest at a school in Kroonstad where she was a teacher, a protest action effected in solidarity with the 1976 Soweto Student uprising which saw scores of students being massacred by the Apartheid regime. This as violent protests broke out around the country against the oppressive use of Afrikaans as a medium of instruction, plus a host of other concerns. Mokoena's mother was also physically and emotionally tortured, which has left her scarred, but she is well and living in QwaQwa. Mokoena's mother is a political veteran in her own right and her son, Fana Mokoena took after her in political activism.

Mokoena is the eldest brother to the late Karabelo Israel Mokoena, Tlotlisang Charity Pigou (née Mokoena) and Mamello Mokoena.

Mokoena's stepfather Elias Bhuti Mokoena is late and so is his mother's eldest sister, Khasiane Alrina Ntloko whom he regarded as his mother too because she raised him while his real mother was incarcerated, and later had to study and work elsewhere. Mokoena fondly referred to Khasiane as "Mada".

== Politics ==
Mokoena was initially a member of the African National Congress. He later left the party, because he believed it was corrupt. He then became a Founding Member of the Economic Freedom Fighters, where he served as a member of the party's Central Command Team. Between 2014 and 2016, he was a member of the National Council of Provinces, the upper house of the Parliament of South Africa. In 2016, he was appointed as a member of the lower house of parliament, the National Assembly, as a member from Free State. Mokoena won a second term in the 2019 general election, with the Economic Freedom Fighters almost doubling their number of seats.

Mokoena resigned from the National Assembly with effect from 16 October 2020 but remained in the EFF's Central Command Team as a member of the War Council, the party's operational authority. He returned to Parliament in 2024 for a short stint and resigned a few months later, both from Parliament and party structures. He left politics altogether and returned to the Film and Television industry as a writer and producer. His company Troupe Films is working on several new innovative projects. After 8 years hiatus from the entertainment industry due to his engagements in politics, Mokoena returned to the small screen in a popular South African soapie Scandal! in a lead role as Vukile Kubheka which has thrust him back into the entertainment centre-stage. He was recently in a number of Netflix features including ‘’180!

== Filmography ==
- 52 Regent East (1993) as Lead
- The Line (1994) as Tebogo
- Inside (1996) as Prisoner (voice)
- Dangerous Ground (1997) as Youth
- Generations (1999) as Dr. Mandla Sithole
- Jump the Gun (1999) as Man in shacks
- In My Country (2004) as Mandla (uncredited)
- Hotel Rwanda (2004) as General Bizimungu
- Cuppen (2006) as Madoda
- The LAB (2006–2009, South African TV series) as Jaws Bengu
- Silent Witness (2008) as Katembula
- Wild at Heart (2008-2010, TV Series) as Mr Ekotto
- A Small Town Called Descent (2010) as Captain James Sikobi
- State of Violence (2010) as Bobedi
- Hopeville (2010) as Mogapi Khobane
- Machine Gun Preacher (2011) as John Garang
- Man on Ground (2011) as Timothi
- Inside Story (2011) as Goodwill
- Safe House (2012) as Officer in charge
- World War Z (2013) as Thierry Umutoni
- Mandela: Long Walk to Freedom (2013) as Govan Mbeki
- Cold Harbour (2013) as Specialist
- The Call (2015) as Sibongiseni
- The Book of Negroes (2015) as Allasane
- Scandal! (2021-2022) as Vukile Kubheka
