= The Number (film) =

2017 film

- Directed by: Khalo Matabane
- Written by: Paul Ian Johnson
- Starring: Presley Chweneyagae
- Release date: 1 August 2017
- Running time: 95 minutes
- Country: South Africa
- Language: Zulu

The Number is a 2017 South African drama film directed by Khalo Matabane. It was screened in the Contemporary World Cinema section at the 2017 Toronto International Film Festival.

== Cast ==
- Presley Chweneyagae as China Boy
- Deon Lotz as Torrein
- Mothusi Magano as Magadien Wentzel
- Warren Masemola as Buttons
- Kevin Smith as Jacobs
- Lemogang Tsipa as Isaac
- Charlton George as Rafiq
- Robert Kyle as Curly
