= How to Steal 2 Million =

- Directed by: Charlie Vundla
- Written by: Charlie Vundla
- Produced by: Karen E. Johnson; Jeremy Nathan; Mfundi Vundla; Michelle Wheatley
- Starring: John Kani; Hlubi Mboya; Menzi Ngubane; Terry Pheto; Rapulana Seiphemo
- Edited by: Garreth Fradgely
- Music by: Trevor Jones
- Distributed by: Indigenous Film Distribution, South Africa; Interactor Media, USA
- Release date: 2 September 2011 (South Africa)
- Running time: 88 minutes
- Country: South Africa
- Languages: Zulu, English, Xhosa

How to Steal 2 Million is a 2011 South African action drama film, written and directed by Charlie Vundla, produced by Karen E. Johnson, Jeremy Nathan, Mfundi Vundla and Michelle Wheatley and starring John Kani, Hlubi Mboya, Menzi Ngubane, Terry Pheto and Rapulana Seiphemo. The film received 11 nominations and won four awards at the Africa Movie Academy Awards in 2012, including the awards for Best Picture, Best Director, Best Actress in a Supporting Role and Best Achievement in Editing.

== Plot ==
Recently released from prison, Jack (Menzi Ngubane), a criminal who was sentenced to five years for robbery whilst his partner, Twala (Rapulana Seiphemo) evaded capture, returns to a very different reality from the one he left. Upon his arrival, Jack is shocked to learn that Twala and his former fiancée Kim (Hlubi Mboya) have gotten married whilst he was doing time on behalf of himself and his partner.

Whilst navigating the transformations that have taken place during his five years away, he decides that he wants to give up the life of crime for good. However, upon being rejected for a loan, and being left desperate for money, Jack finds himself quickly brought back into the crime world.

His next crime entails working with his former partner and a new addition to the team, Olive (Terry Pheto), to organise the robbery of Twala's own father, Julius Twala Snr. for Two Million Rand. However, when the robbery goes wrong, personal agendas are revealed, culminating in an explosive finale.

== Cast ==
- John Kani as Julius Twala Snr.
- Hlubi Mboya as Kim Twala
- Menzi Ngubane as Jack Ngubane
- Terry Pheto as Olive
- Rapulana Seiphemo as Julius Twala Jnr.
- Sello Motloung as Tembe
- Marcel van Heerden as Lt. Du Toit
- Carlo Radebe as Vusi
