= Rapulana Seiphemo =

South African actor

- Born: Rapulana Seiphemo; 4 November 1967 (age 58); Meadowlands, Gauteng, South Africa
- Education: Texas A&M University
- Occupations: Actor; filmmaker; writer; lecturer
- Years active: 1989–present
- Notable work: Generations: The Legacy
- Spouse: Olga Ruberio (m. 2003)
- Awards: Duku Duku, 2002

Rapulana Seiphemo (born 4 November 1967) is a South African actor and filmmaker. He is primarily known for his role as Tau Mogale in the long-running soap opera Generations and its continuation, Generations: The Legacy.

== Career ==
His career began in 1989. He has had starring roles in How to Steal 2 Million, Tsotsi and the sports drama Themba. He made a move from Generations: The Legacy to join Mzansi Magic's telenovela The Queen in early 2020.

Seiphemo and his partner Kenneth Nkosi started a production company called Stepping Stone Pictures in 2003, which they ran until 2015. Under this company, they produced and starred in a film titled Paradise Stop, produced a 13-part drama series for SABC 1 called Task Force, as well as numerous content for Mzansi Magic. They both own a school called the Fumba Academy for Acting. He is making a return in Generations: The Legacy with Connie Ferguson.

== Filmography ==
=== Television ===
| Year | Film | Role | Notes |
|---|---|---|---|
| 1994–2020; 2023–present | Generations: The Legacy | Tau Mogale | Lead |
| 1998 –2001 | Isidingo | Godlieb Mofokeng | Lead |
| 2006 | Muvhango | Pheko Mokeona | Supporting cast |
| 2020– 2022 | The Queen | Hector Sebata | Lead |

=== Film ===
| Year | Film | Role | Notes |
|---|---|---|---|
| 1989 | My Children My Africa | Thami Mbikwana | Starring |
| 2000 | Hijack Stories | Zama | Starring |
| 2006 | Tsotsi | John | Supporting |
| 2008 | Gangster's Paradise: Jerusalema | Lucky Kunene | Starring |
| 2011 | How to Steal 2 Million | Julius Twala Jnr | Starring |
| | Tjovitjo | Bra Terror | |
| | Skeem | Uncredited | Supporting |
| 2010 | Silent Witness | Anton Radebe | |
| | White Wedding | Tumi | Starring |
| 2012 | Room 9 | Damian | |
| 2013 | Boomba & TT | Stanley | |
| 2014 | Task Force | Joseph Ndlovu | |
| 2020 | Santan | Ferreira | Lead role |

== Awards and nominations ==
| Year | Award Ceremony | Prize | Nominated work | Result | Ref |
|---|---|---|---|---|---|
| 2002 | Duku Duku | Best Actor | Tau Mogale in Generations | Won | |

== Personal life ==
Rapulana Seiphemo has been married to Olga Ruberio since 2003.

In February 2016, he was hospitalized due to a car accident.
