= Goodbye Bafana =

2007 film by Bille August

- Cinema poster
- Directed by: Bille August
- Written by: Greg Latter, Bille August
- Produced by: Roberto Cipullo; Gherardo Pagiei; Kwesi Dickson; Ilann Girard; Andro Steinborn; David Wicht; Jan-Luc Van Damme
- Starring: Dennis Haysbert; Joseph Fiennes; Diane Kruger
- Cinematography: Robert Fraisse
- Edited by: Hervé Schneid
- Music by: Dario Marianelli
- Distributed by: Paramount Pictures (United Kingdom/France); Warner Bros. Pictures and X-Verleih (Germany); Cinéart (Belgium); Istituto Luce (Italy); Ster-Kinekor (South Africa)
- Release date: 11 February 2007 (Berlin Film Festival)
- Running time: 140 minutes
- Countries: South Africa; United Kingdom; France; Germany; Belgium; Italy; Luxembourg
- Languages: English; Xhosa
- Budget: $30 million

Goodbye Bafana, or The Color of Freedom (US), is a 2007 drama film, directed by Bille August, about the relationship between Nelson Mandela (Dennis Haysbert) and James Gregory (Joseph Fiennes), his censor officer and prison guard, based on Gregory's book Goodbye Bafana: Nelson Mandela, My Prisoner, My Friend. The film also explores the relationship of James Gregory and his wife as their life changes while Mandela is under Gregory's watch.

Bafana means 'boys'. Gregory lived on a farm and had a black friend when he was a child, which explains his ability to speak Xhosa.

== Plot ==
The young revolutionary and anti-apartheid activist Nelson Mandela is arrested, and it is the task of censor and prison guard James Gregory to watch him. He has long since moved to South Africa with the family for his work in the prison of Robben Island, and slowly he clashes with the politics and racist culture of his countrymen.

== Cast ==
- Joseph Fiennes as James Gregory
- Dennis Haysbert as Nelson Mandela
- Diane Kruger as Gloria Gregory
- Norman Anstey as Jimmy Kruger
- Faith Ndukwana as Winnie Mandela
- Terry Pheto as Zindzi Mandela
- Zikhona Mda as Zenani Mandela
- Leslie Mongezi as Walter Sisulu
- Zingizile Mtuzula as Raymond Mhlaba
- Mehboob Bawa as Ahmed Kathrada
- Shakes Myeko as Andrew Mlangeni
- Sizwe Msutu as Cyril Ramaphosa

== Factual basis ==
The autobiography film was based on, Goodbye Bafana: Nelson Mandela, My Prisoner, My Friend, was derided by Mandela's longtime friend, Anthony Sampson. In Sampson's book Mandela: the Authorised Biography he accused James Gregory, who died of cancer in 2003, of lying and violating Mandela's privacy in his work Goodbye Bafana. Sampson said that Gregory had rarely spoken to Mandela, but censored the letters sent to the prisoner and used this information to fabricate a close relationship with him. Sampson also claimed that other warders suspected Gregory of spying for the government, and that Mandela considered suing Gregory.

Writing in The Guardian, critic and historian Alex von Tunzelmann stated that the film was a "dubious tale" of Nelson Mandela's imprisonment based on his prison guard's memoirs, and that it was a story that contradicted all other known accounts of his time in prison. She went on to say that there was no excuse for the "historical negligence in this movie", while stating that its implicit dismissal of the contradictory accounts of Nelson Mandela and others could be seen as insulting.

In his own autobiography, Long Walk to Freedom, Nelson Mandela mentions James Gregory on two occasions. The first is during Mandela's recollection of his incarceration in Pollsmoor Prison:

"Often, Winnie's visits were overseen by Warrant Officer James Gregory, who had been a censor on Robben Island. I had not known him terribly well there, but he knew us, because he had been responsible for reviewing our incoming and outgoing mail. At Pollsmoor I got to know Gregory better and found him a welcome contrast to the typical warder. He was polished and soft-spoken, and treated Winnie with courtesy and deference".

The second time Mandela mentions Gregory in his autobiography is when he recalls the day of his release from prison in 1990:

"Warrant Officer James Gregory was also there at the house, and I embraced him warmly. In the years that he had looked after me from Pollsmoor through Victor Verster, we had never discussed politics, but our bond was an unspoken one and I would miss his soothing presence".

On the Goodbye Bafana DVD, a segment about the creation of the film, The Making of Goodbye Bafana, contains an interview with Nelson Mandela where he speaks of James Gregory:

"He was one of the most refined warders. Well-informed and courteous with everybody. Soft spoken. Very good observations. I developed a lot of respect for him".
