= State of Violence =

Film

- Film poster
- Directed by: Khalo Matabane
- Written by: Khalo Matabane
- Produced by: Michelle Wheatley, Jeremy Nathan
- Starring: Fana Mokoena; Presley Chweneyagae; Neo Ntlatleng; Lindi Matshikiza; Vusi Kunene
- Cinematography: Matthys Mocke
- Edited by: Audrey Maurion
- Production company: DV8
- Release date: 2010
- Running time: 79 minutes
- Countries: France; South Africa
- Languages: Sotho; TsotsiTaal

State of Violence is a 2010 South African-French film written and directed by Khalo Matabane. The film features Fana Mokoena, Presley Chweneyagae, Neo Ntlatleng, Lindi Matshikiza, and Vusi Kunene. Its settings situated in black township, Alexander. State of violence focuses is on addressing various issues concerning violence in South African townships.

== Background ==
According to Tomaselli, during apartheid-era cinema lacked representation of Black people, and was affected by gender discrimination, classism and racial remarks for many years. This traditional cinema focused on subverting black realism by all means.

Since the beginning of the apartheid establishment, black masses have been excluded from participating throughout mainstream media expressions.

== Plot ==
The film begins at a church where young Bopedi witnesses the massacre. Three cops are involved, two whites officers with a black colleague, who ends to be the last person living in the area. Young Bopedi gathers mob justice to kill the black officer. At that time, any black person worked closely with white was referred a snatcher in which they could threaten to societal transformation and other plans aimed at collapsing the regime government.

Years later, Bobedi has just been made CEO of a large mining company in Johannesburg. After celebrating with his wife, Joy, and friends, he and his wife are victims of a violent attack, and Joy is murdered. Frustrated by the pace of justice, Bobedi decides that revenge is his only option. When he eventually catches the murderer, Bobedi must face the terrible secret that connects them across time and history. He must now choose between continuing the never-ending cycle of violence or stopping it right then and there.

== Awards ==
- Milan 2011
- Saeseeseoaana Junior Poutoa
