= Cold Harbour (film) =

2013 Mauritian film

- Film poster
- Directed by: Carey McKenzie
- Screenplay by: Carey McKenzie
- Produced by: Tendeka Matatu
- Starring: Tony Kgoroge; Fana Mokoena; Deon Lotz
- Cinematography: Shane Daly
- Edited by: Mags Arnold
- Production company: Ten10 Films
- Release dates: 12 October 2013 (Chicago International Film Festival); 19 July 2014 (Durban International Film Festival)
- Running time: 73 minutes
- Country: South Africa
- Languages: Afrikaans; English; Xhosa

Cold Harbour is a 2013 South African crime thriller film directed by Carey McKenzie. It follows the story of a Cape Town policeman investigating a murder that he suspects might be gang-related.

== Cast ==
- Tony Kgoroge as Sizwe Mia
- Fana Mokoena as Specialist
- Deon Lotz as Col. Venske
- Nan Yu as Soong Mei
- Thomas Gumede as Legama
- Zolani Mahola as Camilla
- Quanita Adams as Fisherwoman
- Nicole Bessick as Chantel Venske
- Quentin Chong as Terry Tam
- Winston Chong as Yee Toi
- Kenneth Fok as Hoi Seewan
- Oscar Petersen as Fidel
- Gamiet Pietersen as Ou Boet

== Development and production ==
Development for the film began before 2007, but was put on hold due to a lack of financing during the 2008 financial crisis.

During development of the film, McKenzie and cinematographer Shane Daly decided that the visual look of the film should be desaturated, shot on anamorphic lenses, and moving the camera "as much as possible". Most of the film was shot handheld, with the exception of some Steadicam shots. Tony Kgoroge did all his own stunts in the film.

== Release and reception ==
Cold Harbour premiered at the Chicago International Film Festival on 12 October 2013, and later showed at the Durban International Film Festival on 19 July 2014. The film also won the film festival's Best Actor award for Tony Kgoroge's performance. It was released nation-wide in South Africa on 25 July 2014.

Writing for Screen Anarchy, Stuart Muller described the film as "a bold, starkly beautiful, and thought-provoking film with plenty to savour". Alex Isaacs of Channel24 wrote, "There are lots of things that could have been better about this thriller, but overall I think it’s one of the best South African movies that I have seen in a while because it doesn’t spoon-feed the audience and ask it to choose between who is right and who is wrong."

The film was nominated for two awards at the 2015 Africa Movie Academy Awards: Best Actor in a leading role and Best First Feature Film by a Director.
