= James Gregory (prison officer) =

South African prison guard of Nelson Mandela and writer

- Born: November 7, 1941; South Africa
- Died: March 14, 2003 (aged 61); South Africa
- Citizenship: South Africa
- Occupations: Writer, Screenwriter, Prison officer

James Gregory (7 November 1941 – 2003) was the censor officer and prison guard of Nelson Mandela for many years of his captivity. He later wrote the book Goodbye Bafana: Nelson Mandela, My Prisoner, My Friend, on which the 2007 film Goodbye Bafana was based. The book, and later the film, are based on the idea that Gregory and Mandela had developed a friendship despite being prison guard and prisoner, respectively.

== Mandela's view of Gregory ==
In his autobiography, Long Walk to Freedom, Mandela briefly mentions Gregory on two occasions. The first was during his imprisonment in Pollsmoor Prison:

"Often, Winnie's visits were overseen by Warrant Officer James Gregory, who had been a censor on Robben Island. I had not known him terribly well, but he knew us, because he had been responsible for reviewing our incoming and outgoing mail. At Pollsmoor I got to know Gregory better and found him a welcome contrast to the typical warder. He was polished and soft-spoken, and treated Winnie with courtesy and deference". Instead of barking, 'Time up!' he would say, 'Mrs Mandela, you have five more minutes.'

The second occasion that Mandela mentions Gregory in his autobiography is on the day of his release in 1990 from prison:

"Warrant Officer James Gregory was also there at the house, and I embraced him warmly. In the years that he had looked after me from Pollsmoor through Victor Verster, we had never discussed politics, but our bond was an unspoken one and I would miss his soothing presence".

The Making Of video for the film Goodbye Bafana contains an interview with Nelson Mandela where he speaks of James Gregory as follows:

He was one of the most refined warders. Well-informed and courteous with everybody. Soft spoken. Very good observations. I developed a lot of respect for him.

== Criticism ==
Gregory's claims were disputed by one of Mandela's biographers, Anthony Sampson. Sampson's biography said that Gregory was pretending to be Mandela's friend in prison, so that he could make money. According to Sampson, the close relationship depicted in Gregory's book, Goodbye Bafana, was a fabrication, and in reality Gregory rarely spoke to Mandela. Gregory censored the letters sent to the future president, uncovering details of Mandela's personal life, and later sold this information in Goodbye Bafana.

Sampson said that Mandela considered suing Gregory, but refrained from doing so when the Prison Department distanced itself from Gregory's book. Sampson also said that other warders had told him in interviews that they suspected Gregory of spying for the government.

Mandela later invited Gregory to his inauguration as President, apparently having forgiven him as he had the former president P.W. Botha, and the prosecutor Dr. Percy Yutar who had tried to get him executed in the Rivonia Trial.
