= David Cregeen =

British sculptor

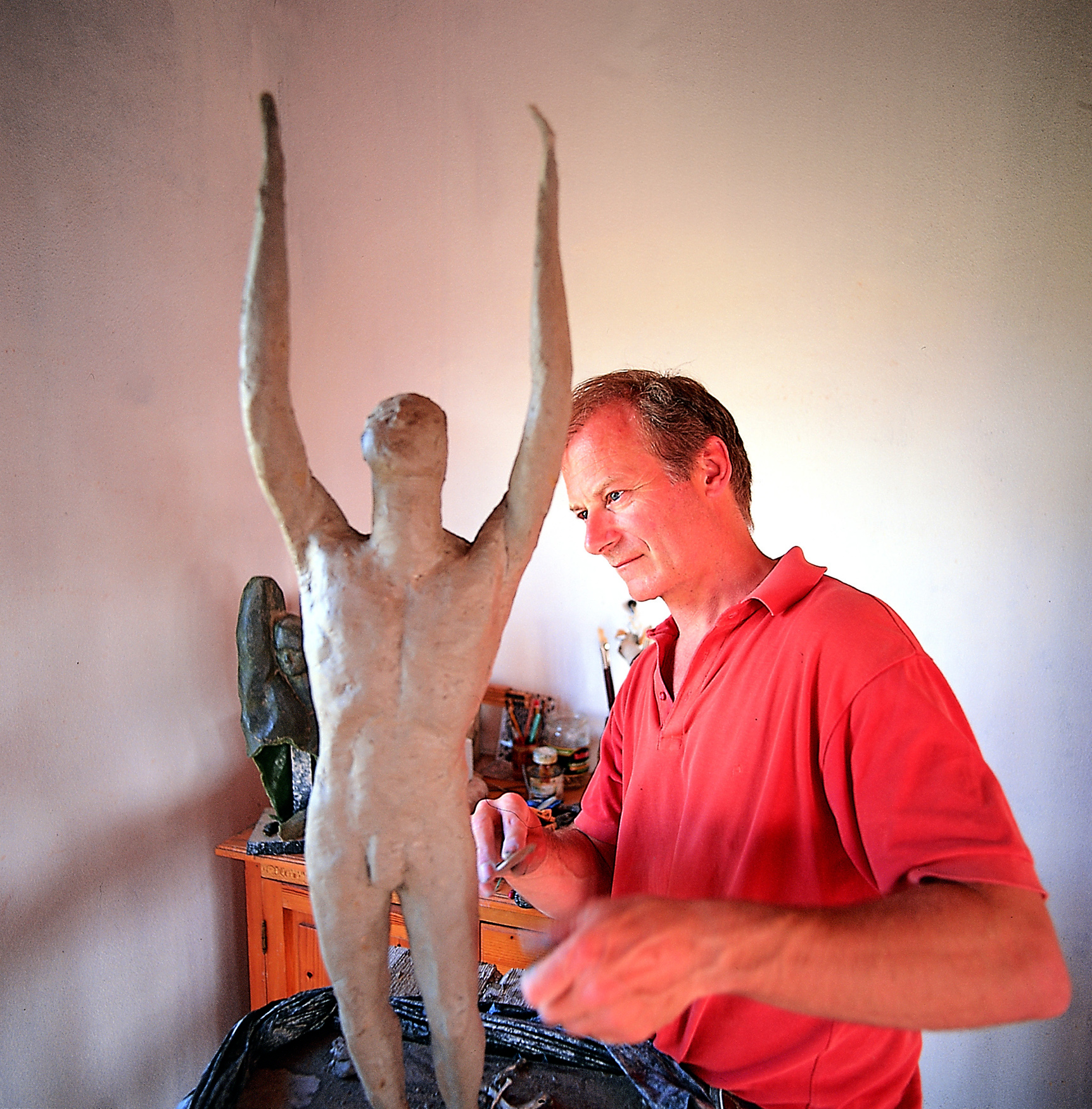
- Cregeen working on figure of Oberon
- Education: MA Hons and M.Phil-University of Edinburgh, Edinburgh College of Art, Accademia di Belle Arti
- Occupation: Sculptor
- Notable work: Faces in History Eternal Images
- Awards: Grollo d'Oro Treviso Venice. 1982.

David Cregeen is a British sculptor whose principal home and studio has, for many years, been located in Southern Turkey. Early in his career, the American art collector Arthur M. Sackler commissioned him to undertake a sculptural project called ' Faces in History'. Amongst multiple other portrait heads, his sculptures included Queen Elizabeth II as head of The Commonwealth, Pope John Paul II, President Nelson Mandela, President Gorbachev and Baroness Thatcher. Cregeen's portrait and figure works have elements of expressionism and abstraction, many of which reflect the early influence of his training in Edinburgh and Florence.

== Early life and education ==
David Cregeen is a member of the Scottish and English Manx family, known for their academic and artistic contributions. His paternal uncle was the Scottish Oral Historian Eric R. Cregeen, his aunt was the archaeologist and playwright Shiela Cregeen, and his maternal grandmother, Madeleine Howells, a painter, was the first cousin of Dr Herbert Howells, an English composer of sacred music.

The eldest of 5 children, his father William Allan Cregeen FRIC was a forensic scientist, and his mother was Joan Madeleine Cregeen MBE. Cregeen was educated in England, Canada and later Scotland where he attended Dollar Academy before going on to Edinburgh University, where he graduated with an Honors Degree in Sociology and Social Anthropology before completing a degree as Master of Philosophy. Concurrent with this, he undertook a special course in sculpture at the Edinburgh College of Art and completed both in 1976 when he moved to Florence. To further his technique in sculpture and drawing, Cregeen enrolled at the Academia de Belle Arti and The Scoulo Libera del Nuodo.

== Works ==
In 1985, Cregeen took part in Humanism in contemporary British Sculpture. Since 1989, while working and exhibiting internationally, he has made his home and principle studio in Southern Turkey; Much of his inspiration is reflected in the internationally touring exhibition, Eternal Image: A Journey in Anatolia.

Among many other portrait sculptures he has completed are busts of the late Queen Elizabeth The Queen Mother, King Michael of Romania, the Prince of Wales, his wife the Duchess of Cornwall, and leading Turkish philanthropist and business man, Sakip Sabanci. In 2006, he travelled to Nigeria to sculpt President Olusegun Obasanjo.

Cregeen's work is found in many public and private collections including Royal Collection, The National Portrait Gallery, Washington DC, The Arthur M Sackler Collection New York, The Sakip Sabanci Museum Istanbul, the University of Edinburgh, Harvard University, the University of Bucharest, Barclays Bank, BNP Paribas, Akbank, and Garanti Bank.

== Figure sculpture ==
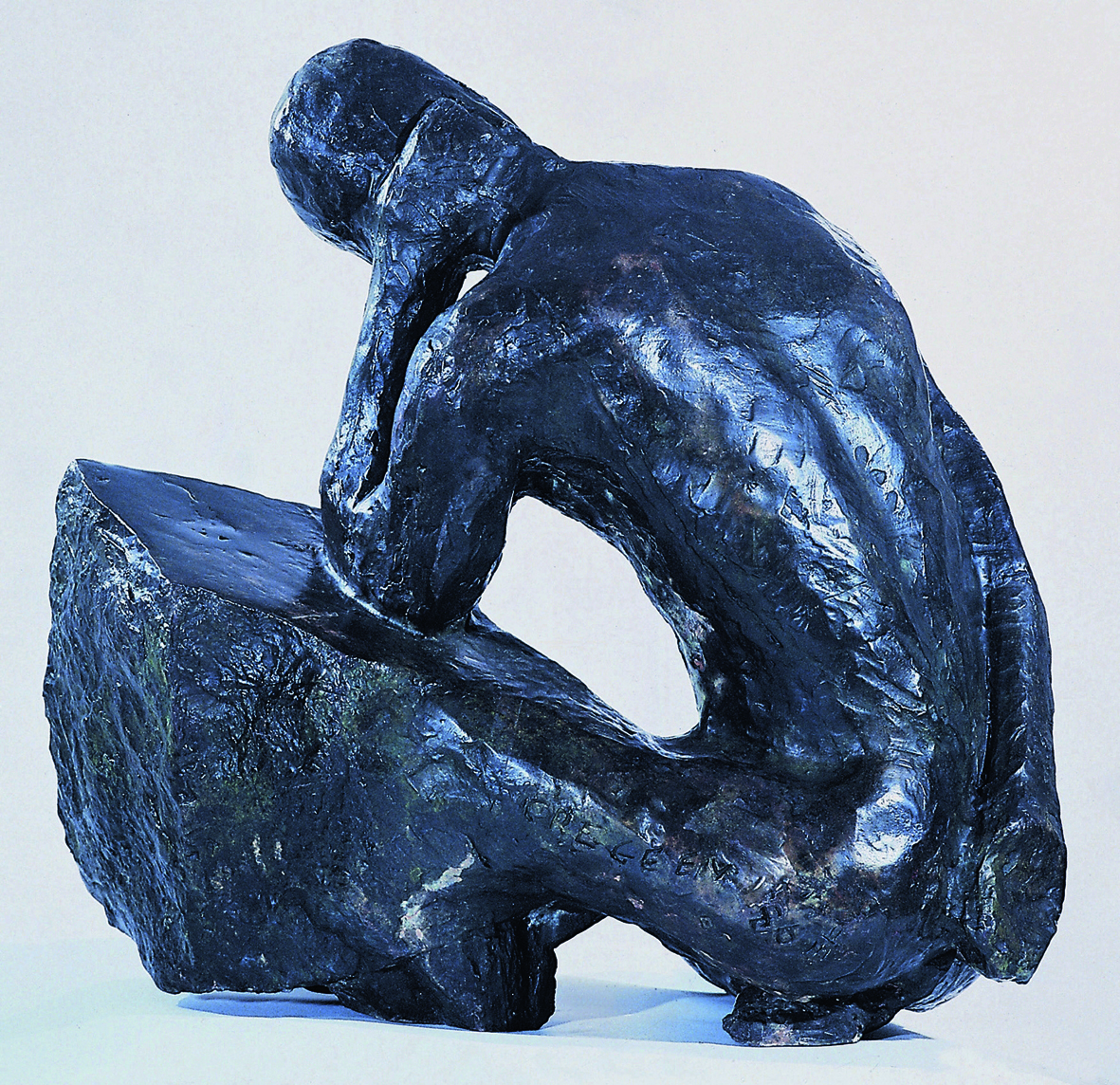
Rockman

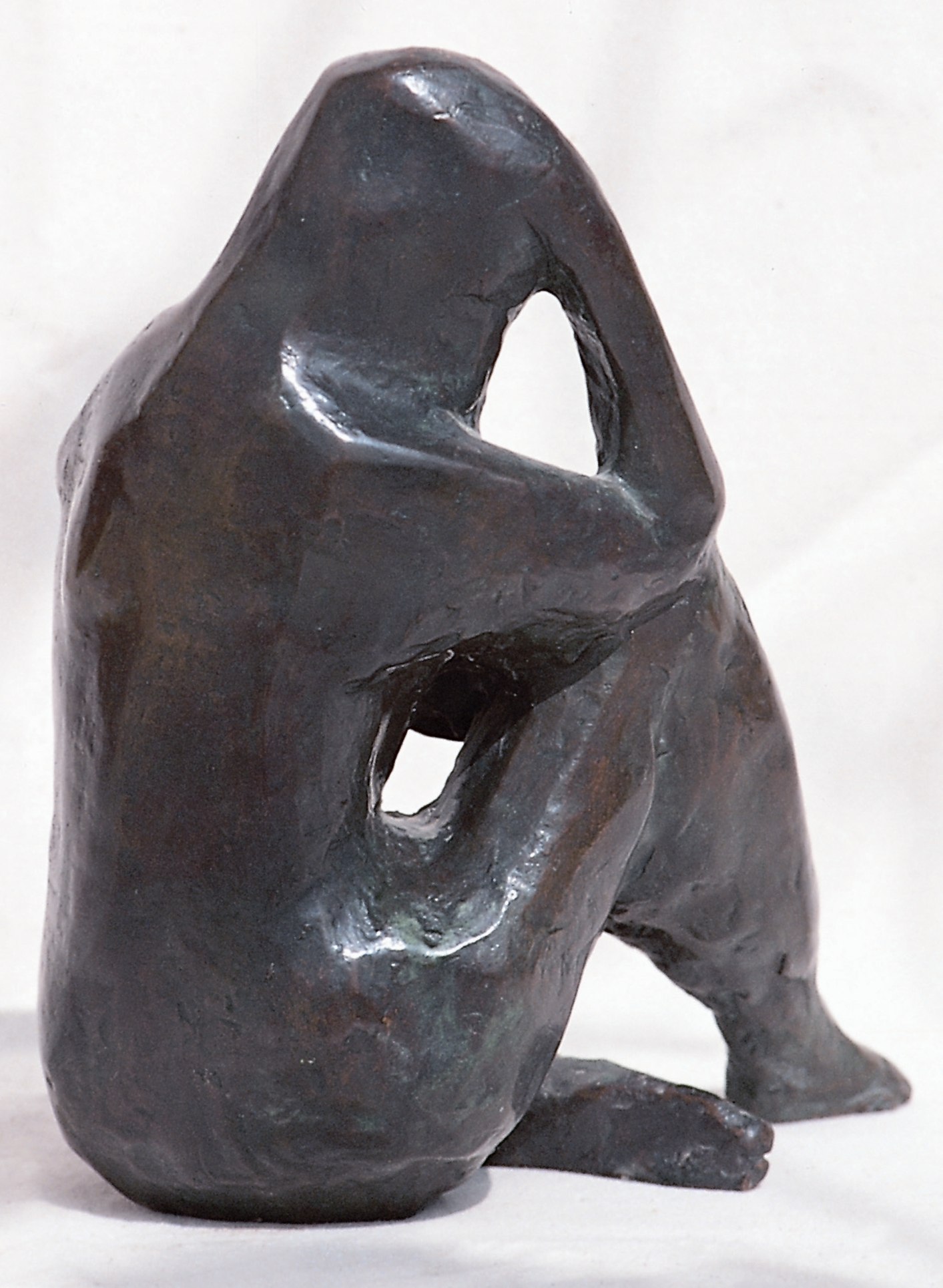
Goat Woman 1989

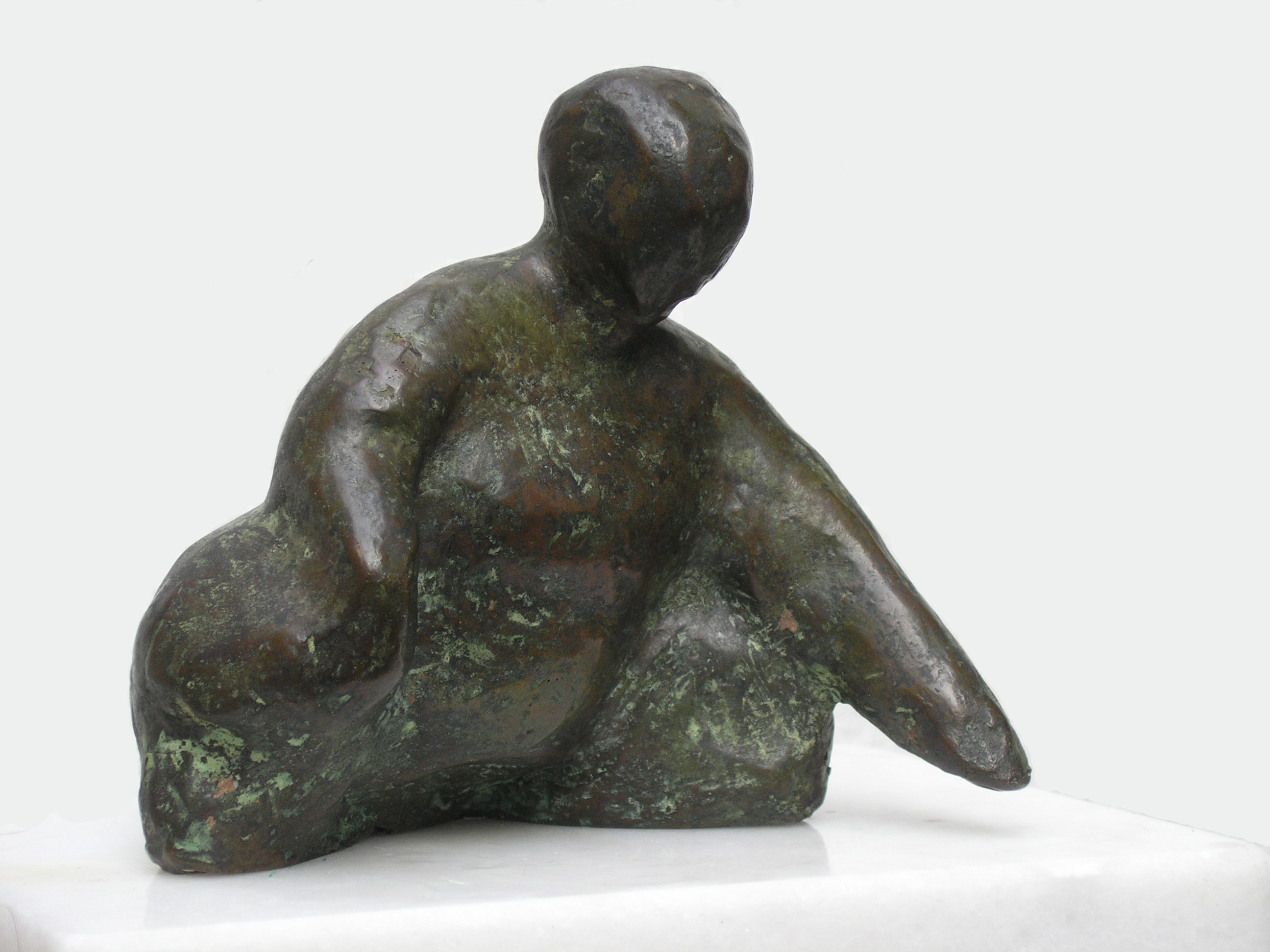
Olive Woman

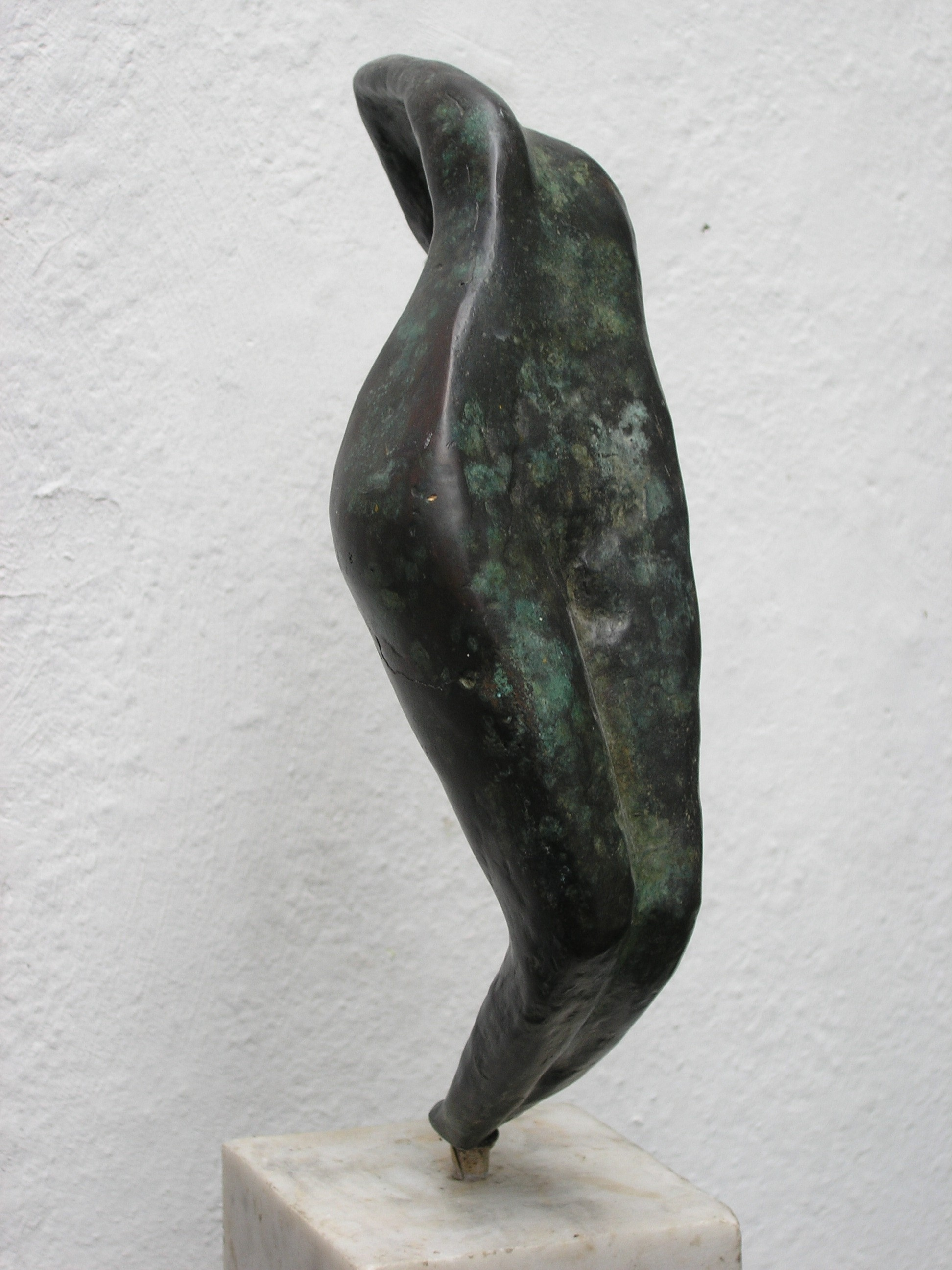
Cornucopia

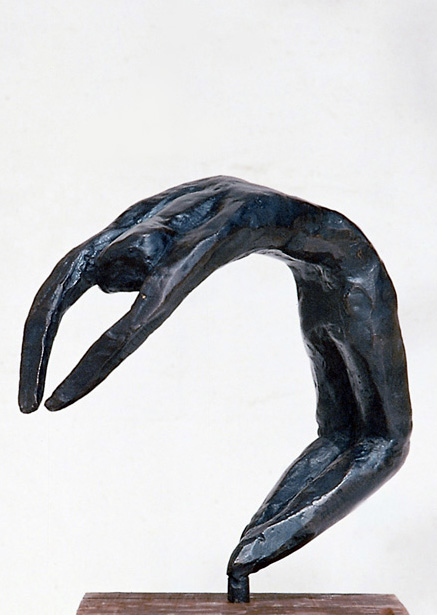
Chirali

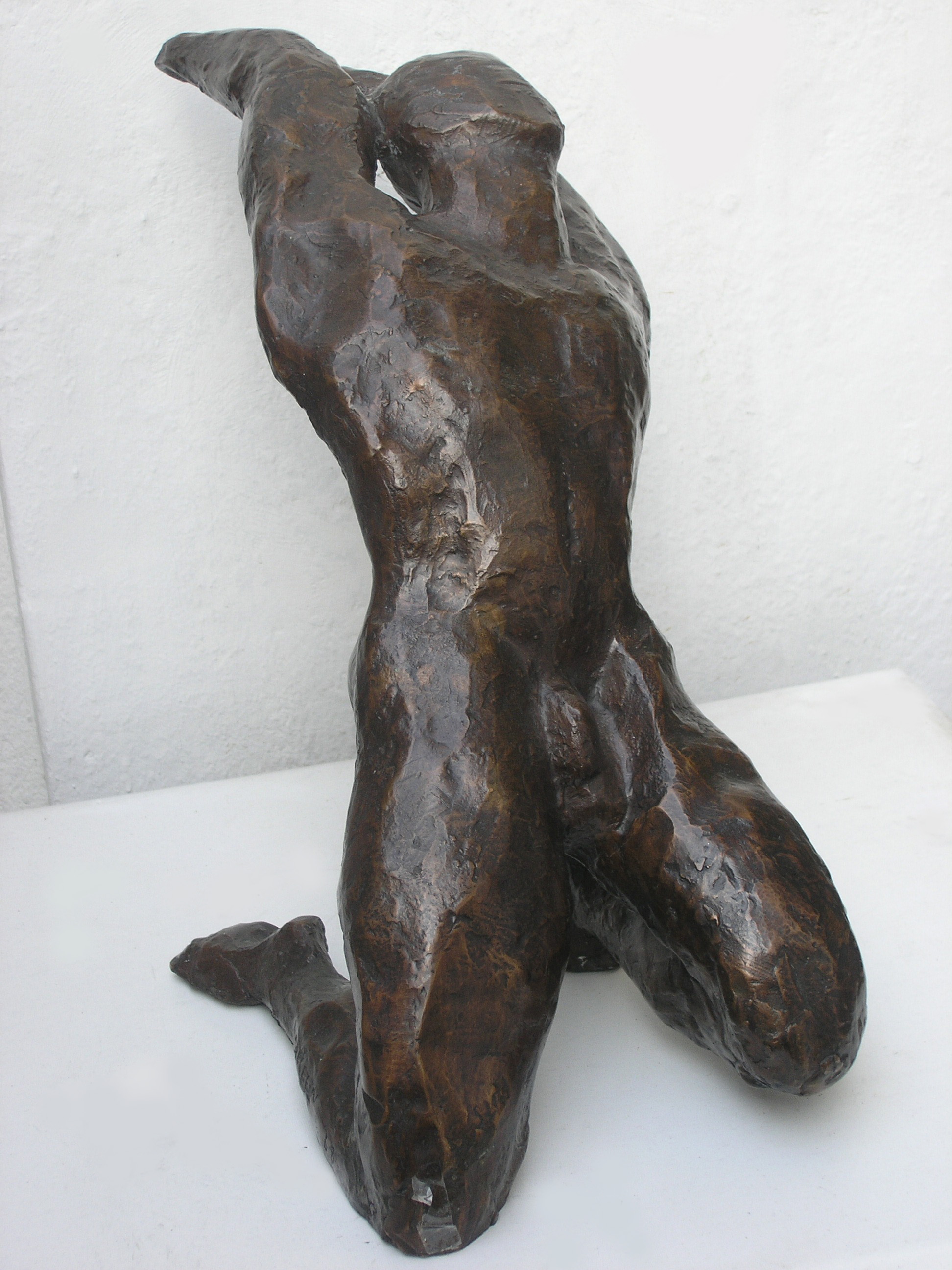
Aspendos 1998

== Portrait sculpture ==
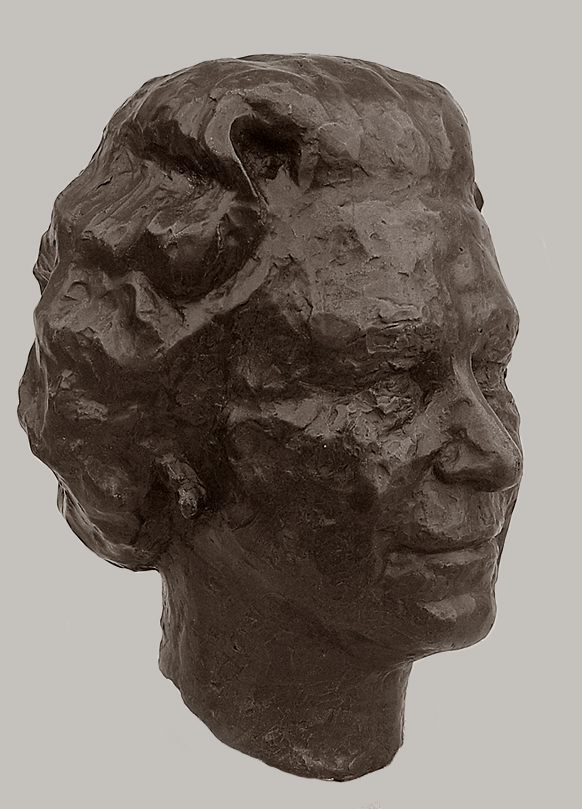
Queen Elizabeth II

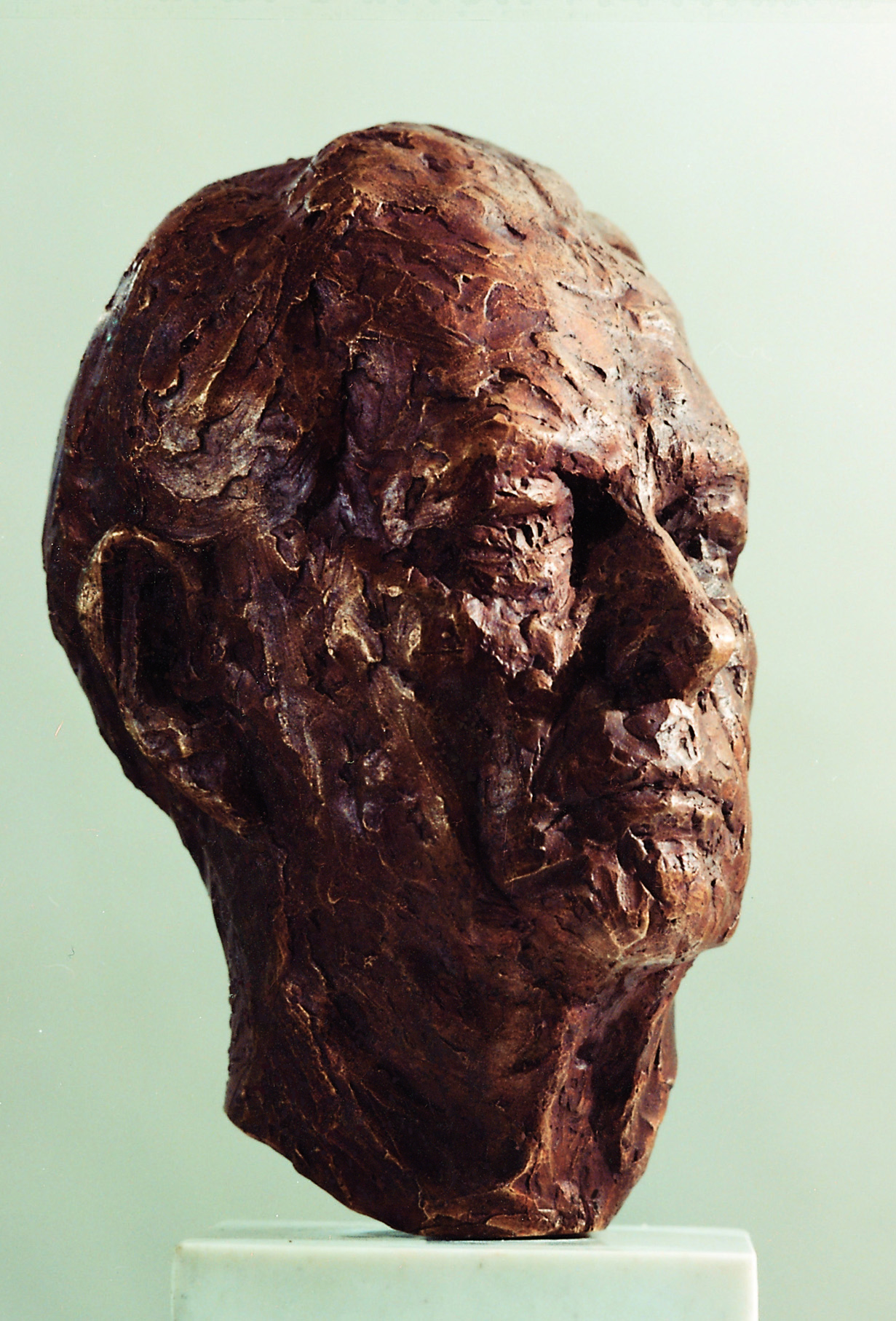
King Michael of Romania

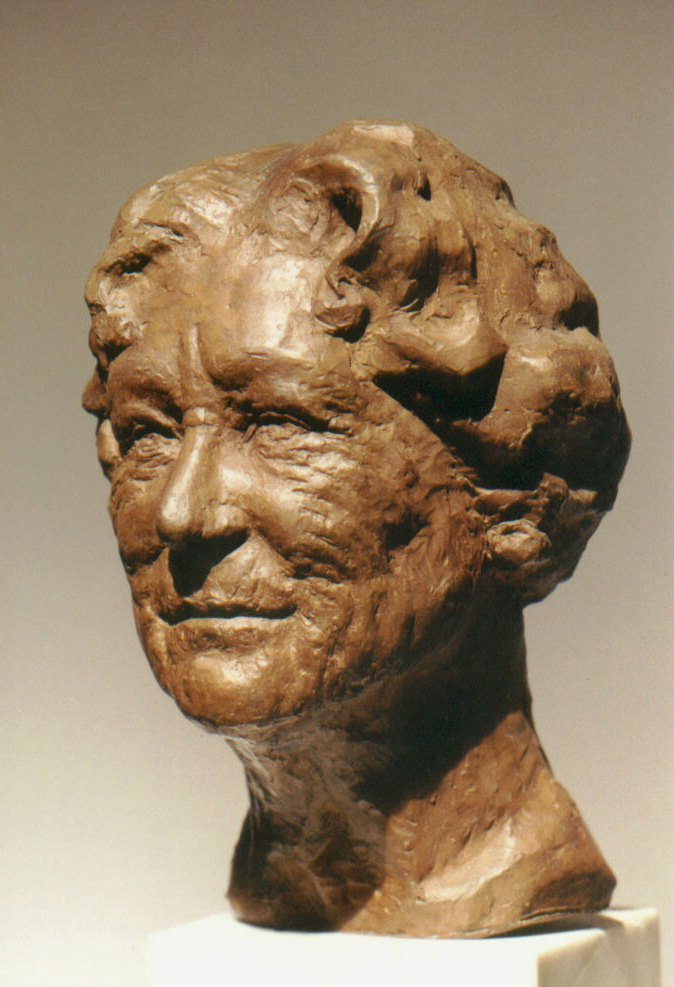
Queen Elizabeth The Queen Mother

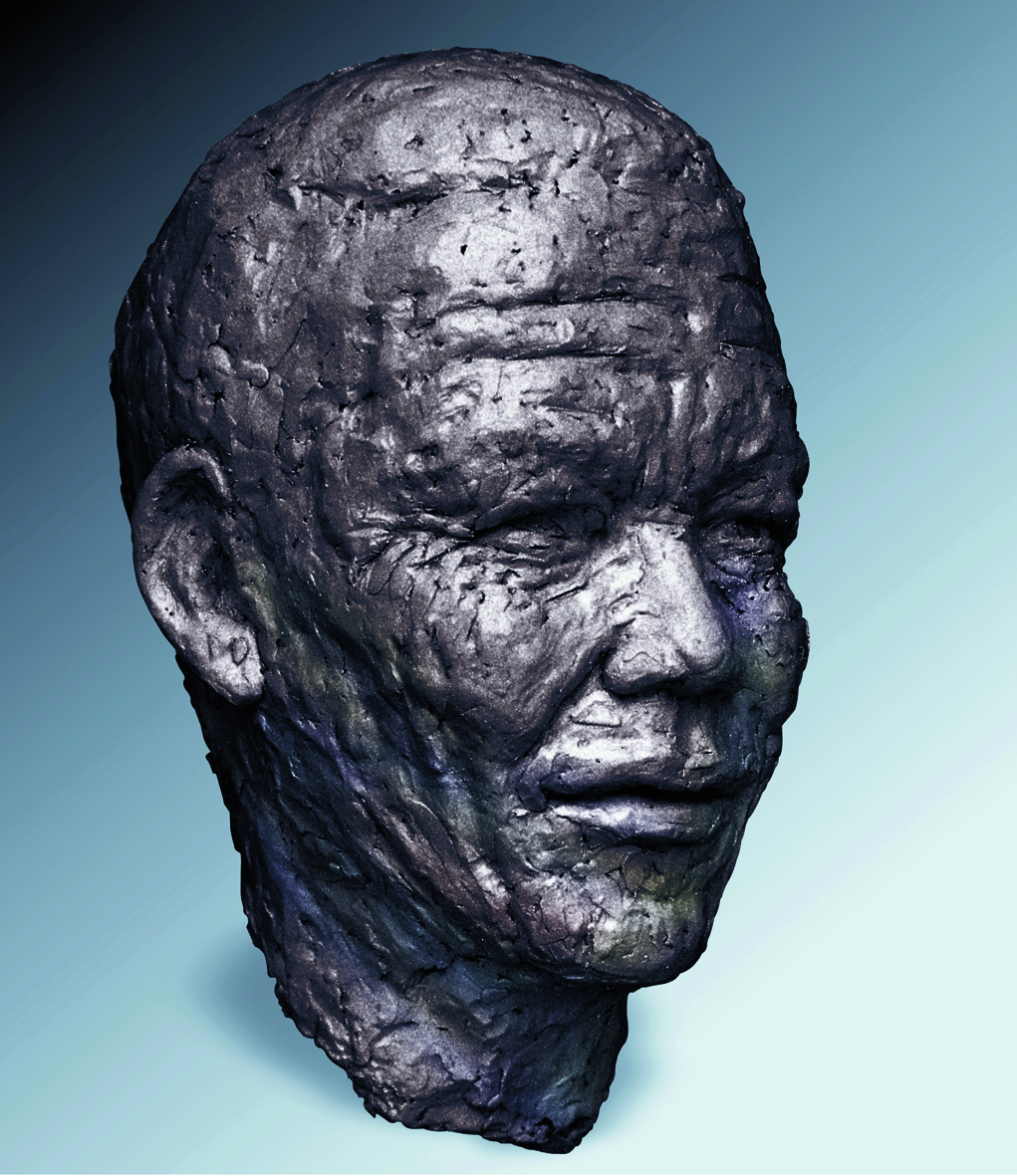
President Nelson Mandela

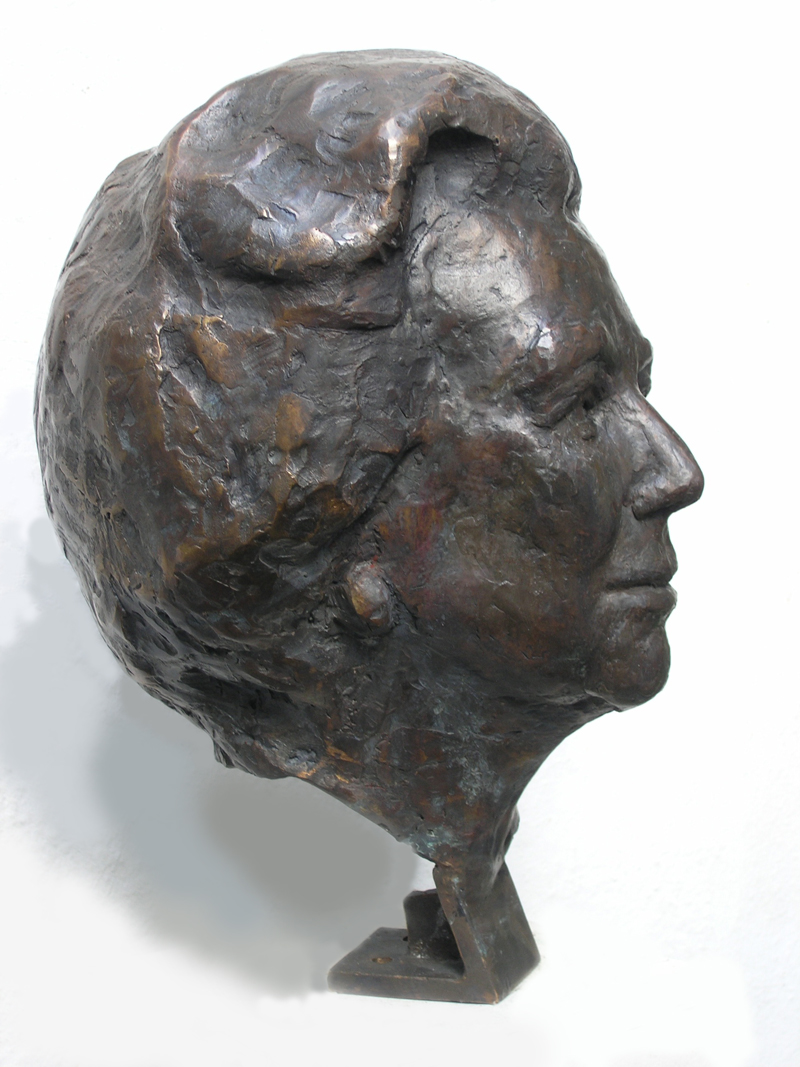
Baroness Thatcher

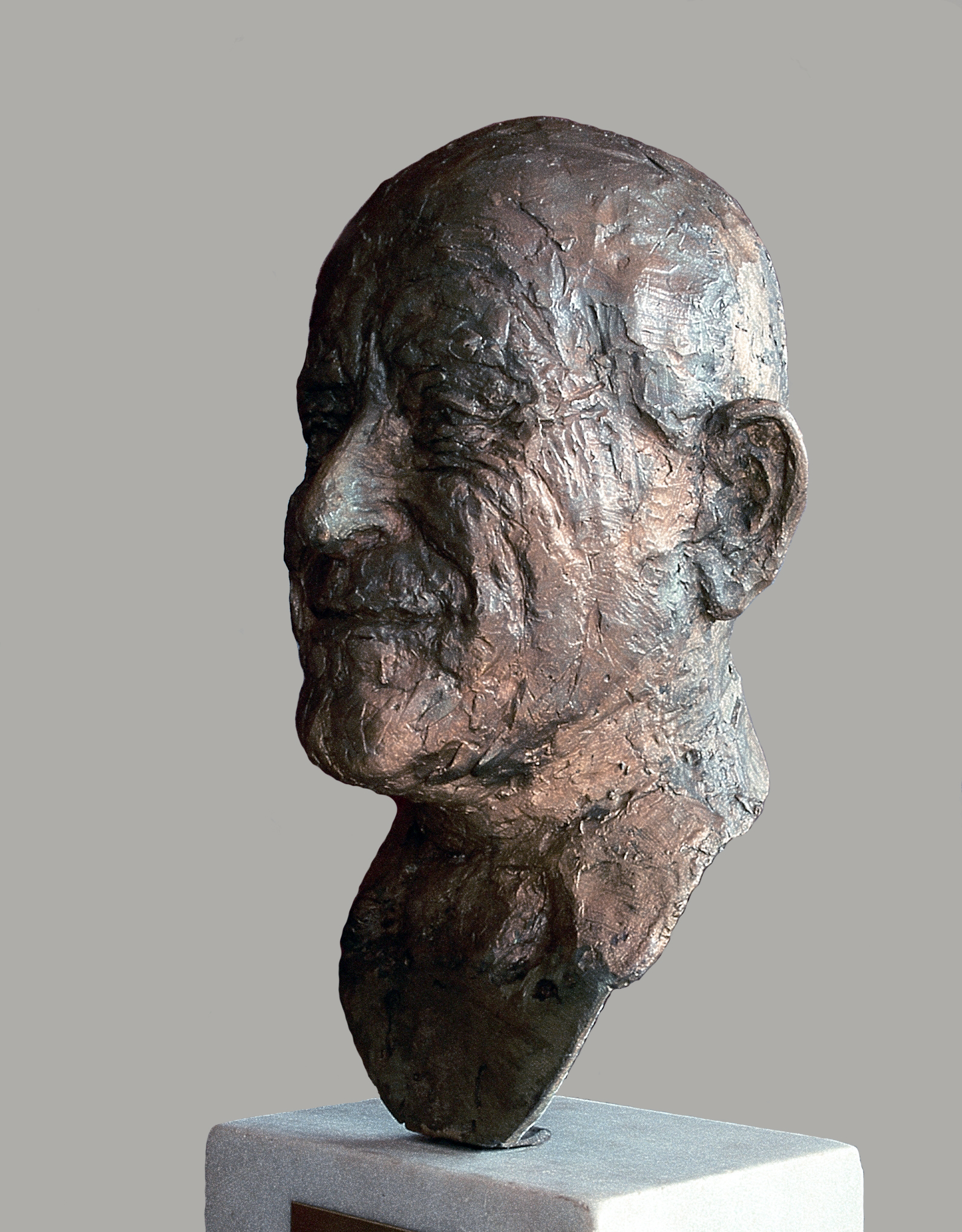
Sakıp Sabancı
