= List of South African actors =

This is an alphabetical list of notable South African actors.

== Born in the 1900s ==
- Siegfried Mynhardt (1906–1996)

== Born in the 1910s ==
- Donald Gray (1914–1976)
- Sid James (1913–1976)

== Born in the 1920s ==
- Al Debbo (1924–2011)
- Rex Garner (1921–2015)
- Joyce Grant (1924–2006)
- Glynis Johns (1923–2024)
- Don Leonard (1925–2002)
- Moira Lister (1923–2007)
- Tommie Meyer (1928–2017)
- William Modisane (1923–1986)
- Dolly Rathebe (1928–2004)
- Ken Gampu (1929–2003)

== Born in the 1930s ==
- Ndaba Mhlongo (1933–1989)
- Lydia Mokgokoloshi (born 1939)
- Mary Twala (1939–2020)
- Washington Xisolo (1934–2017)

== Born in the 1940s ==
- Henry Cele (1949–2007)
- Lillian Dube (born 1945)
- Bill Flynn (1948–2007)
- John Kani (born 1943)
- Joe Mafela (1942–2017)
- Roland Mqwebu (1941–2015)
- Sandra Prinsloo (born 1947)
- Paul Slabolepszy (born 1948)
- Pieter-Dirk Uys (born 1945)
- Marius Weyers (born 1945)

== Born in the 1950s ==
Jerry Mofokeng-Makhetha (Born 1956)

- Glynis Barber (born 1955)
- Elize Cawood (1952–2020)
- Connie Chiume (1952–2024)
- Jana Cilliers (born 1950)
- Vinette Ebrahim (born 1957)
- Alice Krige (born 1954)
- Mbongeni Ngema (1955–2023)
- Nandi Nyembe (1950–2025)
- Jerry Phele (born 1956)
- Angelique Rockas (born 1951)
- Ian Roberts (born 1952)
- Leon Schuster (born 1951)
- Patrick Shai (1956–2022)
- Shaleen Surtie-Richards (1955–2021)
- Regardt van den Bergh (born 1952)

== Born in the 1960s ==
- Suanne Braun (born 1968)
- Embeth Davidtz (born 1965) (born the United States)
- Hamilton Dhlamini (born 1969)
- Desmond Dube (born 1969)
- Lisa Fugard (born 1961)
- Steve Hofmeyr (born 1964)
- Vusi Kunene (born 1966)
- Deon Lotz (born 1964)
- Sello Maake Ka-Ncube (born 1960)
- Sean Cameron Michael (born 1969)
- Patrick Mofokeng (born 1969)
- Nthati Moshesh (born 1969)
- Masoja Msiza (born 1964)
- Themba Ndaba (born 1965)
- Menzi Ngubane (born 1964)
- Pamela Nomvete (born 1964)
- Frank Opperman (born 1960)
- Jonathan Pienaar (born 1962)
- Sandi Schultz (born 1964)
- Rapulana Seiphemo (born 1967)
- Cliff Simon (1962–2021)
- Jennifer Steyn (born 1961)
- Vusi Thanda (born 1963)
- Siyabonga Thwala (born 1969)
- Arnold Vosloo (born 1962)
- Amra-Faye Wright (born 1960)

== Born in the 1970s ==
- Louise Barnes (born 1974)
- Obed Baloyi (born 1970)
- Carl Beukes (born 1976)
- Nick Boraine (born 1971)
- Emmanuel Castis (born 1976)
- Baby Cele (born 1972)
- Sharlto Copley (born 1973)
- Vuyo Dabula (born 1976)
- Hlomla Dandala (born 1974)
- Jack Devnarain (born 1971)
- Sindi Dlathu (born 1974)
- Gideon Emery (born 1972) (born in England)
- Connie Ferguson (born 1970) (born in Botswana)
- Shona Ferguson (1972–2021) (born in Botswana)
- Daisuke Ishiwatari (born 1973)
- David James (born 1972)
- Tony Kgoroge (born 1974)
- Leleti Khumalo (born 1972)
- Ilse Klink (born 1972)
- Diaan Lawrenson (born 1978)
- Florence Masebe (born 1972)
- Hlubi Mboya (born 1978)
- Bonnie Mbuli (born 1979)
- Riaad Moosa (born 1977)
- Zandile Msutwana (born 1979)
- Sophie Ndaba (born 1972)
- Lindiwe Ndlovu (1977–2021)
- Denise Newman (born 1970)
- Kenneth Nkosi (born 1973)
- Alfred Ntombela (born 1972)
- Anthony Oseyemi (born 1977) (born in England)
- Frank Rautenbach (born 1972)
- Neil Sandilands (born 1975)
- Stelio Savante (born 1970)
- Siyabonga Shibe (born 1978)
- Charlize Theron (born 1975)
- Xolile Tshabalala (born 1977)
- Wayne Van Rooyen (born 1978)
- Justine Waddell (born 1975)
- Camilla Waldman (born 1968)

== Born in the 1980s ==
- Jodi Balfour (born 1987)
- Ayanda Borotho (born 1981)
- Ivan Botha (born 1985)
- Lesley-Ann Brandt (born 1981)
- Presley Chweneyagae (1984–2025)
- Jarryd Coetsee (born 1982)
- Gopala Davies (born 1988)
- Zethu Dlomo (born 1989)
- Melanie du Bois (born 1988)
- Kim Engelbrecht (born 1980)
- Shannon Esra (born 1984)
- Adhir Kalyan (born 1983)
- Tyrone Keogh (born 1982)
- Shannon Kook (born 1987)
- Nokuthula Ledwaba (born 1983)
- Natasha Loring (born 1987)
- Gail Mabalane (born 1984)
- Warren Masemola (born 1983)
- Bonang Matheba (born 1987)
- Lynne McCarthy (born 1983)
- Kandyse McClure (born 1980)
- Shamilla Miller (born 1988)
- Shoki Mokgapa (1984–2018)
- Siv Ngesi (born 1985)
- Trevor Noah (born 1984)
- Mishqah Parthiephal (born 1989)
- Zakeeya Patel (born 1988)
- Hilton Pelser (born 1985)
- Terry Pheto (born 1981)
- Khabonina Qubeka (born 1981)
- Jo-anne Reyneke (born 1988)
- Crystal-Donna Roberts (born 1984)
- Jonathan Roxmouth (born 1987)
- Fumani Shilubana (born 1980)
- Mandisi Arnold Shindo (born 1989)
- Cindy Swanepoel (born 1981)
- Reine Swart (born 1986)
- Pearl Thusi (born 1988)
- Mpho Osei Tutu (born 1981) (born in France)
- Luke Tyler (born 1988)
- Amalia Uys (born 1984)
- Wilhelm van der Walt (born 1984)
- Tanya van Graan (born 1983)
- Tinarie van Wyk-Loots (born 1980)
- Himarsha Venkatsamy (born 1984)
- Trix Vivier (born 1988)
- Thishiwe Ziqubu (born 1985)

== Born in the 1990s ==
- Masali Baduza (born 1996)
- Izel Bezuidenhout (born 1998)
- Kai Luke Brümmer (born 1993)
- Lasizwe Dambuza (born 1998)
- Charlbi Dean (1990–2022)
- Ashley de Lange (born 1994)
- Ryan de Villiers (born 1992)
- Jane de Wet (born 1996)
- Lihle Dhlomo (born 1990)
- Pallance Dladla (born 1992)
- Nicole Fortuin (born 1992)
- Arno Greeff (born 1995)
- Gugu Gumede (born 1991)
- Roxane Hayward (born 1991)
- Jazzara Jaslyn (born 1991)
- Nqobile Khumalo (born 1992)
- Katlego Lebogang (born 1996)
- Zenokuhle Maseko (born 1998)
- Nomzamo Mbatha (born 1990)
- Thuso Mbedu (born 1991)
- Alex McGregor (born 1993)
- Akhenime Mfenyana (born 1992)
- Candice Modiselle (born 1994)
- Thabang Molaba (born 1994)
- Michelle Mosalakae (born 1990)
- Kwanele Mthethwa (born 1996)
- Siphesihle Ndaba (born 1997)
- Jessica Nkosi (born 1990)
- Simoné Nortmann (born 1990)
- Lerato Nxumalo (born 1999)
- Meghan Oberholzer (born 1995)
- Caren Pistorius (born 1990)
- Ama Qamata (born 1998)
- Cleve September (born 1993)
- Frances Sholto-Douglas (born 1996)
- Ntobeko Sishi (born 1998)
- Jessica Sutton (born 1993)
- Anja Taljaard (born 1995)
- Thando Thabethe (born 1990)
- Christia Visser (born 1992)
- Lerato Walaza (born 1994)
- Dillon Windvogel (born 1999)
- Meganne Young (born 1990)

== Born in the 2000s ==
- Greteli Fincham (born 2001)
- Paballo Koza (born 2002)
- Kealeboga Masango (born 2003)
- Nefisa Mkhabela (born 2001)
- Rorisang Mohapi (born 2002)
- Thabiso Molokomme (born 2001)
- Khosi Ngema (born 2000)
- Craig Nobela (born 2001)
- Ayakha Ntunja (born 2004)
- Shalate Sekhabi (born 2000)
- Brent Vermeulen (born 2001)
- Khayalethu Xaba (born 2004)
- Luyanda Zuma (born 2001)
- Luyanda Zwane (born 2004)

== Unknown birthdate ==
- Quanita Adams
- David Meyer
- Kate Normington
- Adrienne Pearce
- Leeanda Reddy

== See also ==
- Cinema of South Africa
- Lists of actors
- List of South Africans
- Television in South Africa
