= Indian South Africans =

Community of South Africans of Indian descent

- Proportion of Indian South Africans in each municipality according to the census

Total population
- ▲1,697,506 (2022 census) ▲2.74% of South Africa's population

Regions with significant populations
- KwaZulu-Natal • Gauteng • Western Cape

Languages
- South African English (home language) Second languages Hindi-Urdu • Afrikaans • Isizulu • Tamil • Telugu • Bhojpuri (Naitali) • Awadhi • Gujarati • Kutchi • Bengali • Sindhi • Memoni • Konkani • Marathi • Malayalam • Kannada • Punjabi • Marwari • Other languages of the Indian subcontinent

Religion
- Hinduism, Christianity, Islam, Sikhism, Jainism, Buddhism, Zoroastrianism, others

Related ethnic groups
- Indian diaspora in Southeast Africa, Indo-Mauritians, Indo-Fijians, Indo-Caribbean people, Indian Singaporeans, Malaysian Indians, Indian people, Indian diaspora, South Asian diaspora

Density of the Indian/South Asian population. <1 /km² 1–3 /km² 3–10 /km² 10–30 /km² 30–100 /km² 100–300 /km² 300–1000 /km² 1000–3000 /km² >3000 /km²

Indian/South Asians as a proportion of the total population. 0–20% 20–40% 40–60% 60–80% 80–100%

Indian South Africans are South Africans who descend from indentured labourers and free migrants who arrived from British India during the late 1800s and early 1900s. The majority live in and around the city of Durban, making it one of the largest ethnically Indian-populated cities outside of India.

As a consequence of the policies of apartheid, Indian (synonymous with Asian) is regarded as a race group in South Africa.

== Racial identity ==
During the colonial era, Indians were accorded the same subordinate status in South African society as Blacks were by the white minority, which held the vast majority of political power. in the early Apartheid period, from 1950 to 1959, Indian South Africans were legally classified as being a part of the coloured racial group, and were formulated into their own racial group from 1959 onwards.

During the most intense period of segregation and apartheid, "Indian", "Coloured" and "Malay" group identities controlled numerous aspects of daily life, including where a classified person was permitted to live and study.

The "Indian" racial identity was created by both internal political movements that sought to consolidate support amongst the different Indian ethnicities in the face of discrimination; and the Apartheid government which strictly codified the physical and cultural boundaries between "race groups", and encouraged these group identities. As a result of these Apartheid rules, South Africans continue to identify themselves, and informally classify each other as, "Black Africans", "whites", "Coloureds" and "Indians". Despite living in South Africa for more than 150 years, and being an officially recognised part of the population since 1961, Indians are still sometimes viewed as a foreign presence in the country, and find themselves having to justify their belonging to South Africa as a homeland.

== History ==
=== Indian South Africans ===
The modern-day South African Indian community largely descends from indentured labourers imported by the British in the late 1800s and a smaller proportion who travelled as free subjects of the British Empire.

==== Indentured labourers and Passenger Indians ====
South African Indians are largely descended from Indians who arrived in South Africa from 1860 onwards. The first 342 of these came on board the Truro from Madras, followed by the Belvedere from Calcutta. They were transported as indentured labourers to work on the sugarcane plantations of Natal Colony, and, in total, approximately 200,000 Indians arrived as indentured labourers over a period of 5 decades, later also as indentured coal miners and railway workers. The indentured labourers tended to speak Tamil, Telugu, Bhojpuri, Awadhi and Hindi/Hindustani, and the majority were Hindu with Muslim and Christian minorities. Indians were imported as it was found by colonial authorities that local black Africans were economically self-sufficient, and thus unwilling to subject themselves to employment by colonial farmers, while other colonial authorities believed that the "hunting and warrior" African culture of the time was incompatible with a sudden shift to employed labour. The Mercury newspaper favoured the importation of labour, although other Natal newspapers were against the idea. In general, the importation of labour was not viewed as politically important by colonists when it was proposed, and the importation of Indian labour was driven by lobbying by a relatively small group of sugar planters, and the long-term consequences of Indian immigration (the establishment of a permanent Indian population in Natal) were not taken into account (by 1904, Indians outnumbered whites in Natal). Although 1860 is dated as the beginning of Indian settlement in Natal, a farmer called ER Rathbone was the first to introduce Indian labour to the colony in 1849.

Indentured labourers on sugar plantations were frequently mistreated and lived in unsanitary conditions. A large percentage of indentured labourers returned to India following the expiry of their terms, and some of those who returned alerted authorities in India to abuses taking place in Natal, which led to new safeguards being put in place before further recruiting of indentured labourers was allowed to take place.

Former indentured labourers who did not return to India quickly established themselves as an important general labour force in Natal particularly as industrial and railway workers, with others engaging in market gardening, growing most of the vegetables consumed by the white population. Indians also became fishermen, and worked as clerks; in the postal service; and as court interpreters.

The remaining Indian immigration was from passenger Indians, comprising traders and others who migrated to South Africa shortly after the indentured labourers, paid for their own fares and travelled as British subjects. These immigrant Indians who became traders were from varying religious backgrounds, namely Hindu and Muslims but largely from Gujarat (including Memons and Surtis), later joined by Konkanis, and Urdu speakers from Uttar Pradesh. The Muslims played an important part in the establishment of Islam in the areas where they settled. Indian traders were sometimes referred to as "Arab traders" because of their dress, and because large numbers of them were Muslim.

Passenger Indians, who initially operated in Durban, expanded inland, to the South African Republic (Transvaal), establishing communities in settlements on the main road between Johannesburg and Durban. Natal's Indian traders rapidly displaced small white shop owners in trade with other Indians, and with black Africans, causing resentment among white businesses.

Researchers have made efforts to collect and make available shipping lists of Indian immigrants.

==== Early discrimination (1860–1910) ====
Indians faced discrimination to varying degrees in all parts of South Africa.

===== Natal =====
Indians faced repressive legislation in Natal. They were forced to carry passes in 1888. In 1893, Mohandas K. Gandhi (later known as Mahatma Gandhi) arrived in South Africa to represent an Indian businessman in a legal dispute. Following his arrival in South Africa, Gandhi experienced racial discrimination, and, following the proposal of legislation to restrict Indian voting rights in Natal, he helped organise resistance, leading to the formation of the Natal Indian Congress. This organised resistance led to the unification of disparate groups of South African Indians for the first time. Although the bill was defeated, it was successfully reintroduced in 1896.

===== Transvaal =====
The South African Republic government first instituted discriminatory legislation against Indians in 1885, which led to protests from the British government, as the Indians were British subjects, and was used as one of the casus belli for the Second Boer War. Indians were banned from working in the mining industry, and areas were set aside for coolie locations in various towns in the Transvaal. Persons of colour could also not walk on sidewalks in the Transvaal. Following the end of the Second Boer War, the new colonial administration of the Transvaal Colony continued to maintain the same discriminatory practices against Indians.

===== Cape Colony =====
Passenger Indians who moved to the Cape Colony, although facing petty discrimination, were generally well treated, could own property, could vote, and could trade freely. Many Muslim men in this group married Cape Malay women, and their children were later often classified as Cape Malay as part of the wider group classified as Coloureds.

===== Orange Free State =====
Indians were prohibited by an 1891 statute from living in the Orange Free State, then an independent Boer Republic, and this led to the almost total absence of Indians from the area, a situation that persisted into the apartheid era.

==== Union of South Africa (1910–1948) ====
Efforts to encourage Indians to repatriate to India included financial incentives, as well as discriminatory treatment. In December 1926, and January 1927, the South African government and Indian authorities had a Round Table conference where it was agreed that the Indian government would create a scheme for the repatriation of Indians, with the South African government agreeing to "uplift" the Indians who remained, monitored by an Indian government Agent. However, fewer Indians than expected were repatriated, and racial tensions continued to simmer between Indians and whites, into the 1940s.

==== Apartheid (1948–1994) ====
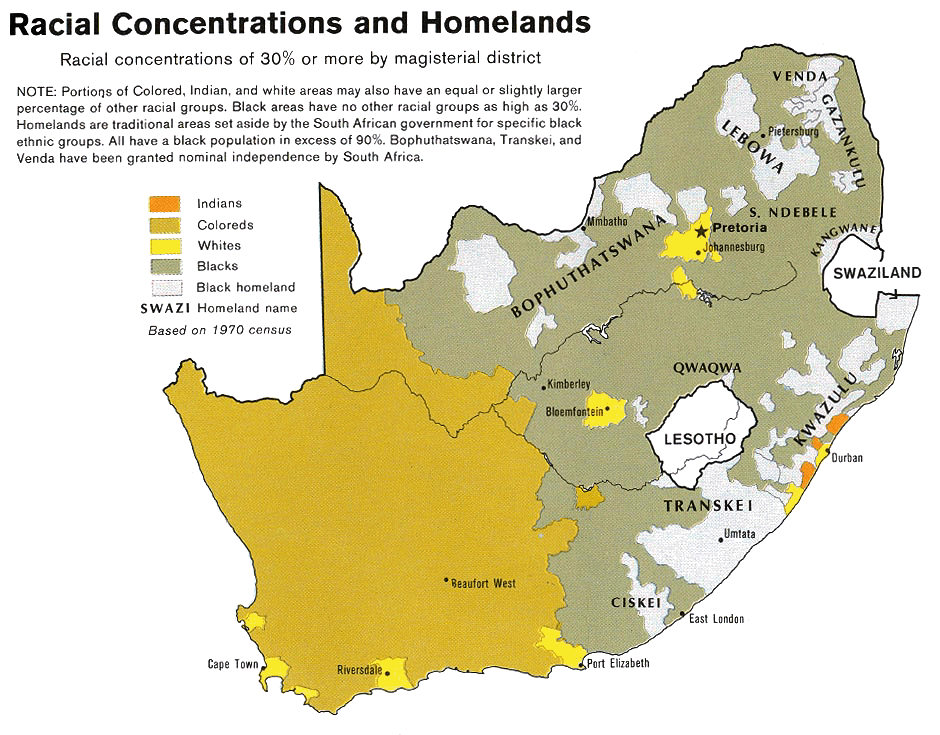
South Africa racial map, 1979. The orange colour shows where people of Indian origin were more prevalent. In other areas, such as those marked “Coloreds”, they were either a minority or not allowed to enter under apartheid laws.

The Durban riots was an anti-Indian riot predominantly by Zulus targeting Indians in Durban, South Africa in January 1949. The riots resulted in the massacre of mostly poor Indians. In total 142 people died in the riots and another 1,087 people were injured. It also led to the destruction of 58 shops, 247 dwellings and one factory.

Discriminated against by apartheid legislation, such as the Group Areas Act, applied in 1950, Indians were forcibly moved into Indian townships, and had their movements restricted. They were not allowed to reside in the Orange Free State Province, and needed special permission to enter or transit through that province. They were also, as a matter of state policy, given an inferior education compared to white South Africans. The Asiatic Land Tenure and the Indian Representative Act of 1946 were repealed.

The Population Registration Act, 1950 initially defined Indians as being part of the Coloured population.

In 1961, Indians were officially recognised as permanent part of the South African population, the Department of Indian Affairs was established, with a white minister in charge. In 1968, the South African Indian Council came into being, serving as a link between the government and the Indian people.

The University of Durban-Westville (now part of the University of KwaZulu-Natal) was built with a Rand-for-Rand contribution from Indian South Africans and the government in the 1970s. Before that, Indian students had to take a ferry to Salisbury Island's abandoned prison, which served as their university.

Casual racist expressions were used during the years of apartheid. Indians in South Africa were (and sometimes still are) referred to by the racial epithet 'coolie'.

In 1968, the South African Indian Council (not to be confused with the anti-apartheid South African Indian Congress which had the same initials) was created by the government, and in 1974, the council was reconstituted to allow for 50% of its members to be elected by Indians. The Council did not enjoy much support, for example, in 1981, only 6% of eligible voters participated in elections for the council.

In 1983, the Constitution was reformed to allow the Coloured and Indian minorities a limited participation in separate and subordinate Houses of a Tricameral Parliament, a development which saw limited support and very low voter turnouts. The Indian house was called the House of Delegates. Some aspects of Indian life were regulated by this house, including education. The theory was that the Indian minority could be allowed limited rights, but the Black majority were to become citizens of independent homelands. These separate arrangements were removed by the negotiations which took place from 1990 on to provide all South Africans with the vote.

In a 2005 retrospective study by Josephine C. Naidoo and Devi Moodley Rajab interviewed a series of Indian South Africans about their experience living through apartheid; their study highlighted education, the workplace, and general day-to-day living. One participant who was a doctor said that it was considered the norm for Non-White and White doctors to mingle while working at the hospital but when there was any down time or breaks, they were to go back to their segregated quarters. Indians were paid 1/4 to 1/3 what their white counterparts were paid. Another finding of this study was the psychological harm suffered by Indians living in South Africa during apartheid. There was a strong degree of alienation that left a strong feeling of inferiority.

==== Post-apartheid ====
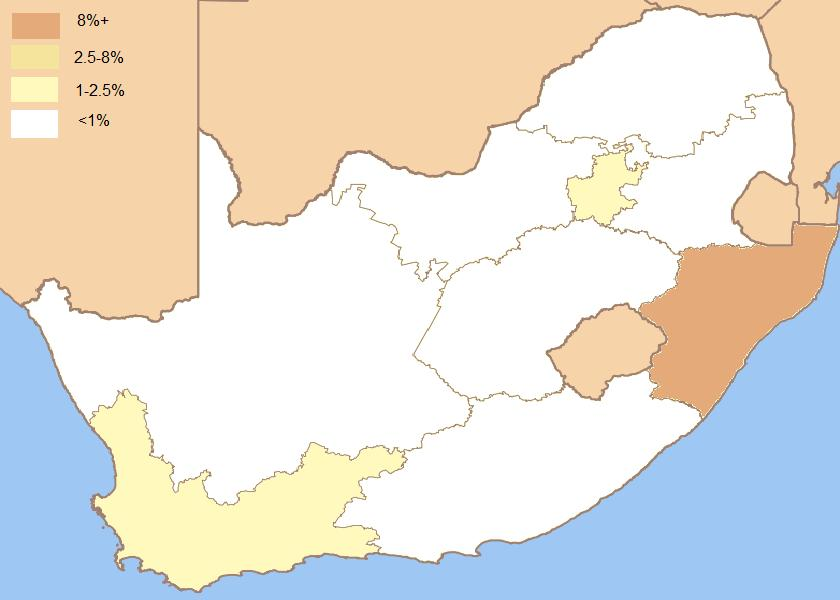
Post-apartheid population distribution of Indian-origin people in provinces of South Africa.

===== Post-apartheid politics =====
Many Indians played an important role in the anti-apartheid struggle and some occupied positions of power in post-apartheid South Africa. In post-apartheid South Africa, Indians have maintained prominent positions in the ruling African National Congress.

Amichand Rajbansi's Minority Front (formerly the National People's Party) retained some support in its strongholds. However, after Rajbansi's death in 2011, the party failed to win any seats in the national assembly following the 2014 general election.

Indians who were citizens before 1994, and thus discriminated against by the apartheid system, are considered black for the purposes of Employment Equity; that is, they are classified as having been disadvantaged under apartheid. They are thus eligible for "affirmative action" and Black Economic Empowerment allocations.

===== Post-apartheid immigration from South Asia =====
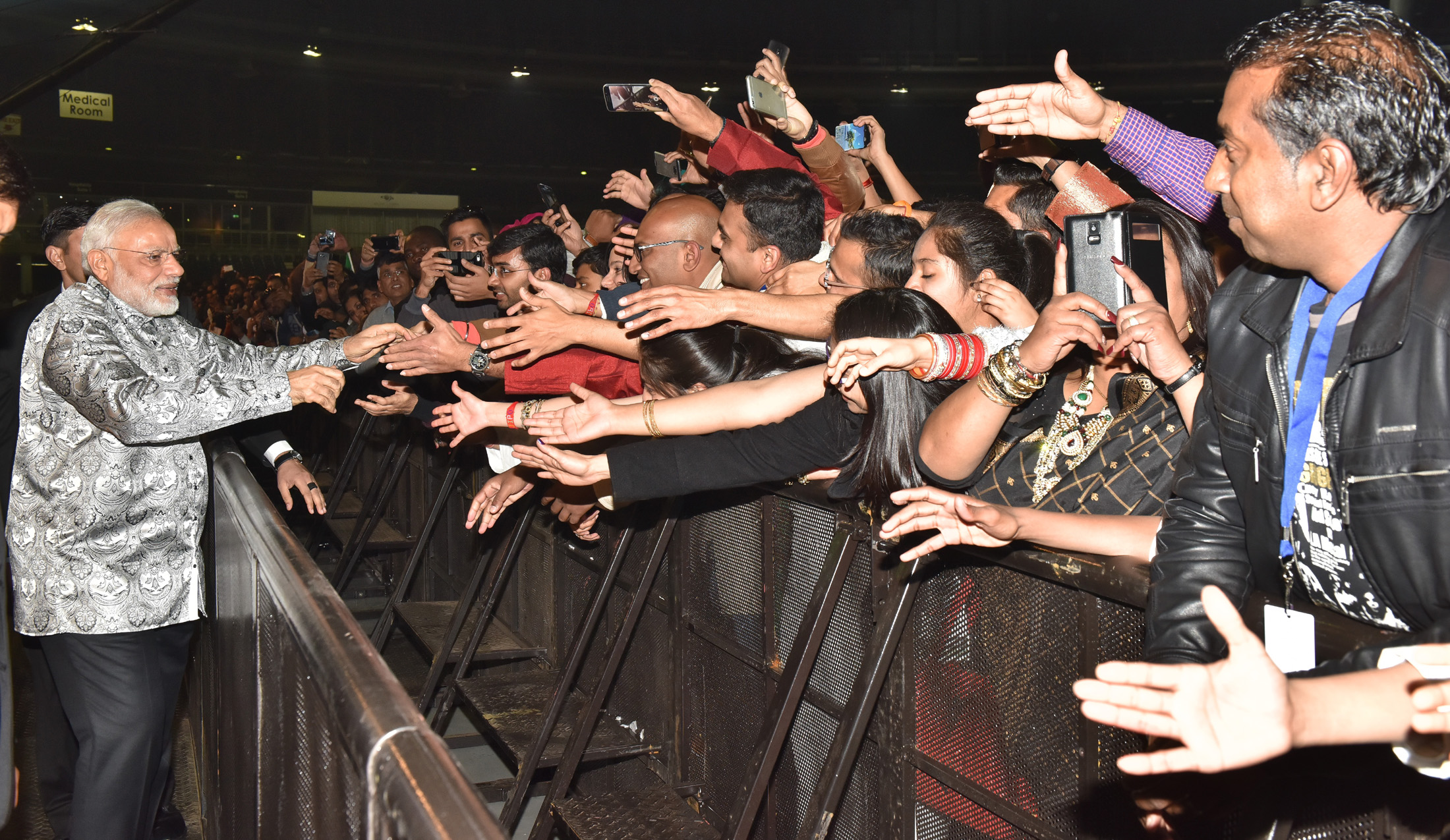
Indian Prime Minister Narendra Modi meets members of Indian community in Johannesburg, 8 July 2016

Following the end of apartheid, a new wave of South Asian immigration commenced from India, Bangladesh, Pakistan and Sri Lanka, paralleling the movement of Africans from the diaspora and neighbouring African countries to the post-apartheid South Africa. These recent migrants are usually not regarded as being part of the Indian community, although they often live in traditionally Indian areas.

Among these post-apartheid immigrants, the controversial Gupta family from India managed to acquire vast political and economic influence in a short time, under the reign of former President Jacob Zuma.

=== Assimilated groups ===
==== Slaves and exiles in the Dutch-ruled Cape ====
A significant proportion of slaves imported into the Cape were from parts of India (which included present-day Bangladesh), Indonesia and Sri Lanka. While South African scholars mistakenly assumed these slaves were bought in "slave markets", many of the slaves were victims of kidnapping. Many slaves had no identity as Indians and were subsumed into the "Cape Coloured" and Cape Malay communities. White Afrikaners also may have some Indian slave ancestry, an example of this being former State President F.W. de Klerk, who revealed in his autobiography that one of his ancestors was a female slave called Diana of Bengal. Indian slaves who were Muslim became part of the Cape Malay community after they were freed, initially adopting the Malay language, and then Afrikaans.

An early Indian to settle in South Africa was Kalaga Prabhu, a Goud Saraswat Brahmin merchant from Cochin. He was the foremost among the Konkani merchants in Cochin (modern day Kochi in Kerala). As punishment for conspiring with the Mysorean Muslim king Hyder Ali to overthrow the king of Cochin, Kalaga Prabhu and his son Chorda Prabhu were arrested by the Dutch and exiled with their families for life to the Cape of Good Hope in 1771. No further record of this individual and his descendants if any exists.

== Religion ==
Religion among Indian South Africans (2022 Census)
Religion	Percent
Hinduism	37.9%
Christianity	33.6%
Islam	24.5%
Others	4%

Almost all South African Indians are either Hindu, Christian, or Muslim. There are also small groups of Parsis, Sikhs, and Buddhists. It is also estimated that there are around 13,000 Sikhs in South Africa. The majority of South African Muslims are Indian or belong to the multi-ethnic community in the Western Cape.

The proportion of Indian South Africans following Hinduism have decreased from 50% in 1996 to 47.27% in 2001. This decreased to 41.3% in 2016, and further decreased to 37.9% in 2022. This is mainly due to the conversion of Hindus to Christianity by missionaries.

== Education ==
Like Coloureds, until the end of Apartheid, Indian children largely attended segregated Indian government schools, which were administered nationally, and wrote separate matriculation examinations. These arrangements ended by 1997.

Until 1991, state government schools taught in English, choosing one of five Indian languages, namely Hindi, Gujarati, Tamil, Telugu and Urdu to be taken as non-examination subjects. But, the languages were dropped from state-run schools. The national council for eastern languages has requested the government teach these five languages. The provincial government agreed to allow these languages to be taught in KwaZulu-Natal. These languages can be chosen as a third language up to the final year of school.

== Languages ==
=== South African Indian English ===
English is the first language of most Indian South Africans. From the 1950s on, English came to be taught to Indian children in schools, leading to language shift taking place, with English becoming the first language of the majority.

Because these children were separated by apartheid from white English-speakers, their English developed in very different ways from South African English. In recent decades, the dialect has come much closer to the standard language through the model taught in schools. The result is a variety of English which mixes features of Indian, South African, Standard British, and other influences.

=== Current status of Indian languages ===
A diminishing minority of Indian South Africans, notably those in older generations, are fluent in their ancestral Indian languages such as Tamil, Gujarati, Marathi, Bengali, Odia, Bhojpuri, Malayalam, Urdu, Hindi, Telugu and others as a first language or second language. In some small towns in the former Transvaal, Afrikaans is used as a first language by older Indians. Almost all younger people have English as their first language. The compulsory second language taught at school, such as Afrikaans or Zulu, is either spoken or understood.

As a result of promotion by cultural organisations and the influence of Indian cinemas, many younger Indians can understand (but not usually speak) Indian languages to a limited degree.

Recent immigrants from India, Pakistan and Bangladesh have maintained fluency in their mother tongues.

== Cuisine ==
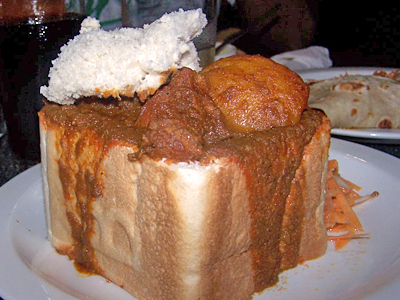
An example of bunny chow served in Durban, originated in the Indian South African community.

Curried dishes are popular in South Africa among people of all ethnic origins; many dishes came to the country with the thousands of Indian labourers brought to South Africa in the nineteenth century. South African Indian cuisine adapted to local ingredients, and dishes include a variety of curries, rotis, sweetmeats, chutneys, fried snacks such as samoosa, and other savoury foods. Bunny chow, an Indian dish from Durban consisting of a hollowed-out loaf of bread filled with curry, was invented by necessity, as Indians were not allowed to eat at their own restaurants. The dish forms part of mainstream South African cuisine and has become quite popular.

== Media and entertainment ==
Even though Indian languages are seldom spoken or understood by younger Indians, English-subtitled Indian films and television programmes remain popular among South African Indians. These are broadcast both by the DStv satellite television service, which carries Zee TV, B4U, NDTV, and a Hindi-language Sony channel. In addition, Tamil–language channels, Sun TV and KTV, were introduced in 2004.

DVD, and previously, video versions of Bollywood films are widely available. Large cinema chains like Ster-Kinekor began showing Bollywood films by the early 2000s. Indian culture in South Africa has some similarities to the worldwide Desi subculture, however, South African Indians developed a distinctive musical and literary culture of their own, which was to some extent eclipsed by the global Bollywood/Desi culture in the 1990s and 2000s. There is also an increasing amount of interest in Turkish popular culture, by Muslims in particular.

The slang term charou (various spellings) is often used by Indians, particularly in the Durban area, to refer to themselves.

Card games, in particular, the trick-taking card game Thunee (similar to Twenty-eight) are popular among South African Indians.

Radio Hindvani is a community radio station based in Durban and is aimed at the promotion of Hindi culture and language amongst South Africans. The station's frequency reaches Durban and all surrounding areas.

The South African Broadcasting Corporation (SABC) also has an Indian-oriented radio service called Lotus FM, launched during the apartheid era, and began some showing Indian-focused programming in the 1990s including locally produced magazine shows. Pay television channel M-Net also had additional programming aimed at Indians called East Net. Bollywood movies have been broadcast by the SABC. The Sunday Times has a supplement distributed in Indian areas called the Extra, and the Sunday Tribune publishes a similar supplement, called the Herald. A Bollywood section, 'Bollyworld' is published by the Daily News on Mondays.

== Events ==
Among the major charity and cultural events in South Africa, organised every year by the local Indian community is the Gandhi Walk, which is the oldest event in South Africa commemorating Mahatma Gandhi. Held annually in Lenasia, south of Johannesburg, it has been held 34 times.

The Durban Festival of Chariots is organised annually at the beachfront by the ISKCON. The festival is attended by tens of thousands of people. In Lenasia a gala fund-raising banquet of the Saaberie Chishty Ambulance Service is held annually.

== Demographics ==
=== Colony of Natal ===
1910 Colony of Natal Census
Population group	Number	Percent (%)
Black Africans	904,041	81.53
Asian	100,918	9.10
White	97,109	8.75
Coloured	6,686	0.60
Total	1,108,754	100.00

=== Union of South Africa ===
Indian population in South Africa, 1921-1960
Year	Population	Share	Source
1921	165,731	~2.5%	Union of South Africa Census 1921
1936	219,691	~2.4%	Union of South Africa Census 1936
1946	~285,000	~2.4%	Union of South Africa Census 1946
1951	~367,000	~2.6%	Union of South Africa Census 1951
1960	477,125	~2.9%	Union of South Africa Census 1960

=== Republic of South Africa (1961–1991) ===
Indian/Asian population in South Africa (1970-1996)
Year	Population	Share	Source
1970	620,000	~3.0%	South African Census 1970
1980	870,000	~3.2%	South African Census 1980
1986	878,000	2.6% (including homelands)	Survey of Race Relations
1991	987,000	~2.9%	South African Census 1991

Indian population in South Africa (1996–2025)
Year	Population	Share of population	Source
1996	1,045,596	2.6%	South African Census 1996
2004	1,131,342	2,4%	Mid-year population estimates 2004
2005	1,153,900	2,5%	Mid-year population estimates 2005
2007	1,173,700	2,5%	Mid-year population estimates 2007
2009	1,279,100	2,6%	Mid-year population estimates 2009
2010	1,299,900	2,6%	Mid-year population estimates 2010
2011	1,274,867	2,5%	Census 2011
2012	1,286,930	2,5%	Mid-year population estimates 2012
2013	1,329,300	2,5%	Mid-year population estimates 2013
2014	1,341,900	2,5%	Mid-year population estimates 2014
2015	1,362,000	2,5%	Mid-year population estimates 2015
2016	1,386,000	2,5%	Mid-year population estimates 2016
2017	1,409,100	2,5%	Mid-year population estimates 2017
2018	1,448,300	2,5%	Mid-year population estimates 2016
2019	1,503,007	2,6%	Mid-year population estimates 2019
2020	1,541,113	2,6%	Mid-year population estimates 2020
2021	1,545,222	2,6%	Mid-year population estimates 2021
2022	1,554,996	2,6%	South African census 2022
2023	1,697,506	2,7%	Mid-year population estimates 2023
2024	1,628,794	2,7%	Mid-year population estimates 2024
2025	1,654,971	2,6%	Mid-year population estimates 2025

=== Fertility rate ===
Total fertility rate by population group in South Africa (1970–2011)
Year	African	Coloured	Indian/Asian	White	South Africa (total)
1970	6.64	6.00	3.62	2.59	5.75
1975	5.99	5.00	3.47	2.36	5.19
1980	5.34	4.00	3.32	2.13	4.62
1985	4.68	3.00	3.10	1.90	4.03
1990	4.03	2.84	2.80	1.84	3.58
1991	3.90	2.80	2.75	1.84	3.49
1995	3.38	2.67	2.51	1.80	3.10
1996	3.25	2.64	2.45	1.78	3.00
2000	3.05	2.46	2.07	1.74	2.86
2001	3.00	2.41	1.98	1.74	2.80
2004	2.93	2.37	1.90	1.74	2.77
2011	2.82	2.57	1.85	1.70	2.67

=== Median Age ===
Median age by population group in South Africa (1996–2022)
Year	Black African	Coloured	Indian/Asian	White
1996	21	23	26	33
2001	22	24	29	35
2011	21	26	32	38
2022	27	30	37	45

=== Earnings ===
Per capita income by population group in constant 2000 ZAR
Year	White	Coloured	Indian/Asian	Black African	Average
1956	R30,494	R5,158	R6,668	R2,627	R8,541
1960	R31,230	R4,977	R5,340	R2,532	R8,378
1970	R45,751	R7,929	R9,248	R3,133	R11,140
1975	R49,877	R9,688	R12,687	R4,289	R12,696
1980	R48,340	R9,238	R12,304	R4,088	R11,818
1987	R45,828	R9,572	R13,823	R3,879	R10,661
1993	R46,486	R8,990	R19,537	R5,073	R11,177
1995	R48,387	R9,668	R23,424	R6,525	R12,572
2000	R56,179	R12,911	R23,025	R8,926	R16,220
2008	R75,297	R16,567	R51,457	R9,790	R17,475

Average annual household income by population group, Income and Expenditure Survey (IES) 2022/2023
Population group	Average annual income (ZAR)
White	R676,375
Indian/Asian	R417,431
Coloured	R260,816
Black African	R143,632

== Distribution ==
The following table shows the distribution of Asian and Indian people by province, according to the South African National Census of 2022:

Province	Indian/Asian pop. (2001)	Indian/Asian pop. (2011)	Indian/Asian pop. (2022)	% province (2001)	% province (2011)	% province (2022)
Eastern Cape	18,483	27,929	37,568	0.29	0.42	0.52
Free State	3,719	10,398	12,978	0.13	0.38	0.43
Gauteng	218,124	356,574	329,736	2.32	2.90	2.19
KwaZulu-Natal	798,163	756,991	1,157,542	8.38	7.37	9.32
Limpopo	8,867	17,881	35,958	0.18	0.33	0.55
Mpumalanga	10,964	27,917	25,882	0.33	0.69	0.50
North West	9,738	20,652	2,654	0.33	0.59	0.07
Northern Cape	2,379	7,827	10,824	0.24	0.68	0.80
Western Cape	45,030	60,761	84,363	1.00	1.04	1.13
Total	1,115,467	1,286,930	1,697,506	2.49	2.49	2.74

== Notable Indian South Africans ==
=== Sport ===
- Hashim Amla, Cricketer
- Cody Chetty, Cricketer
- Trisha Chetty, South African Women's cricketer
- Dinesha Devnarain, South African Women's cricketer
- Raoul Hyman, Racing driver
- Christopher Hyman, Businessman and racing driver
- Rivash Gobind, Cricketer
- Imraan Khan, Cricketer
- Keshav Maharaj, Cricketer
- Rivaldo Moonsamy, Cricketer
- Senuran Muthusamy, Cricketer
- Sherwyn Naicker, Footballer
- Dylan Naidoo, Golfer
- Jiveshan Pillay, Cricketer
- Tabraiz Shamsi, Cricketer
- Luther Singh, Footballer
- Prenelan Subrayen, Cricketer
- Jonathan Vandiar, Cricketer
- Shabnim Ismail, South African Women's cricketer

=== Politics ===
- Kader Asmal, Activist
- Amina Cachalia, Activist
- Yusuf Cassim, Politician
- Yusuf Dadoo, Politician
- Arun Manilal Gandhi, Activist
- Ela Gandhi, Activist
- Frene Ginwala, Journalist and Politician
- Kesaveloo Goonam, Doctor, Activist
- Pravin Gordhan, Politician
- Sandy Kalyan, Politician
- Ahmed Kathrada, Politician
- Mac Maharaj, Activist
- Rashida Manjoo, Former United Nations Special Rapporteur on Violence Against Women
- M. J. Naidoo, Lawyer
- Jay Naidoo, Activist
- Kumi Naidoo, Activist
- Billy Nair, Politician
- Roy Padayachie, Former Cabinet Minister and Activist
- Ebrahim Patel, Politician
- Navi Pillay, Jurist
- Ravi Pillay, Politician
- Ashor Sarupen, Politician and Deputy Finance Minister
- Shaik Subrathie, Politician
- Enver Surty, Politician
- Sonny Venkatrathnam, Activist

=== Arts and Media ===
- Zain Bhikha, Singer and songwriter
- Lesley-Ann Brandt, Actress
- Gopala Davies, Actor, Director
- Jack Devnarain, Actor and National Chairperson of the South African Guild of Actors (SAGA)
- Bryoni Govender Beauty queen, Miss universe South Africa 2023
- Devi Sankaree Govender, investigative journalist, television personality, and media professional
- Adhir Kalyan, Actor
- Tatum Keshwar, South African fashion model, psychologist and beauty pageant titleholder who was crowned Miss South Africa 2008.
- Alan Khan, Broadcaster
- Jyoti Mistry, Film director, scholar
- Riaad Moosa, Comedian, doctor
- Kerishnie Naicker, Miss South Africa 1997
- Anand Naidoo, Television anchor and correspondent for CGTN America based in Washington, DC
- Kass Naidoo, Sports presenter and cricket commentator
- Shashi Naidoo, Model and presenter
- Jailoshini Naidoo, Actress
- Tarina Patel, Actress, producer, model and philanthropist
- Mishqah Parthiephal, Actress
- Sketchy Bongo, Musician
- Deepak Ram, Musician
- Leeanda Reddy, Actress
- Melissa Reddy, Presenter
- Tyla, Singer

=== Academic ===
- Soromini Kallichurum, Dean

=== Military ===
- Sagaren Pillay, Rear-admiral

=== Writer ===
- Jayapraga Reddy, Writer

== See also ==
- Asians in Africa
- Memons in South Africa
- Tamil South Africans
- Islam in South Africa
- India–South Africa relations
- High yellow
- Anglo-Indian people
- Sikhism in South Africa
- Kalderash
