= Rajesh Gopie =

South African actor

- Born: Rajesh Gopie; Durban, South Africa
- Education: University of Natal
- Occupations: Director, actor, playwright
- Years active: 1993–present
- Height: 1.75 m (5 ft 9 in)

Rajesh Gopie, is a South African actor of Indian descent. He is best known for the roles in the television serials Stellenbosch, Professionals and The World Unseen.

== Personal life ==
He was born in Durban, South Africa to an Indian family. He obtained his B.A. degree in English, Drama and History at the University of Natal.

In July 2020, his aunt Dolly Singh died at the age of 76 by COVID-19 complications.

== Career ==
After his graduation, he moved to England for a year and studied drama further. After his return to South Africa, he made the stage play Out of Bounds which deals with life and times of South African Indian families.

After returning to South Africa, he joined with several stage plays such as Be Proud, Be Yourself, Out of Bounds (1999), The Coolie Odyssey (2002), The Tale of the Allergist's Wife, The Chimp Project, Romeo and Juliet, Back to the Faith, Mahatma vs Gandhi, The Pinter Sketches, The Wiz and Hamlet (2005). In the meantime, he worked as the playwright for the plays, Out of Bounds (1999), Be Proud, Be Yourself Out of Bounds (2001), Mahatma-Madiba, Marital Bliss and Too Close for Comfort. In 2001, he won the award for the Best New Indigenous Script at Fleur du Cap Theatre Awards for the play Out of Bounds. He also directed, written and played in the popular stage play The Coolie Odyssey in 2002.

In 2013 he was awarded the Oppenheimer Scholarship where he went London to pursue post-graduate studies. Then he completed his master's degree in Actor training and coaching at the Royal Central School of Speech and Drama in 2014. In 2015, he became a theater director with the stage play Yerma which was written by Federico García Lorca.

In 2017, he acted in the South African Indian comedy film Keeping Up with the Kandasamys directed by Jayan Moodley. The film became the first South African Indian film to be screened widely in theaters. It stars Jailoshini Naidoo, Maeshni Naicker, Madhushan Singh, and Mishqah Parthiephal. The film later became the highest-grossing film in South Africa in 2017, and the highest grossing South African film worldwide in 2017.

In 2018, he appeared in the South African Indian action crime film Mayfair. He played the lead role of 'Aziz' in the film, which later received positive reviews. The film was also screened at the 62nd BFI London Film Festival and Africa in Motion Film Festival in October 2018.

== Filmography ==
Year	Film	Role	Ref.
2007	The World Unseen	Sadru	
2008	Hansie: A True Story	Rakesh	
2017	Keeping Up with the Kandasamys	Preggie Naidoo	
2018	Mayfair	Aziz	
2020	New Material	Shabir	

=== Television ===
Year	Film	Role	Notes
1993	Generations		
2004	Zero Tolerance	Raks Moodley	
2004	The Eastern Bride	Masoud Boutros	Home movie
2007	Stellenbosch	Kishore Patel	
2017	Swartwater	Jeffrey Nasser	
2017	The Indian Detective	Neighbour	TV Mini-Series
2020	Professionals	Ajay Khan	
