= Ronak Patani =

British actor

- Born: Ronak Patani; 1993 (age 32–33); London, England
- Occupations: Actor, voice artist, poet
- Years active: 2012–present
- Height: 1.71 m (5 ft 7 in)

Ronak Patani (born 1993), is a British actor and voice artist of Indian descent. He is best known for the roles in the films Point Break, The Works and Mayfair.

== Career ==
He was raised in London, England and later trained at Royal Central School of Speech and Drama. Then in 2012, he made his acting debut with the short film Hannah. In 2014, he worked as a casting assistant for the British film Three Brothers directed by Aleem Khan.

In 2015, he made his international acting debut in the Hollywood remake of Point Break. He was lucky to work opposite top British stars: Ralph Fiennes, Benedict Cumberbatch, Meera Syal, Sharon D Clarke and Sanjeev Bhaskar in his early career. During his acting performance in the play Macbeth at the Royal National Theatre, his friend Rajesh Gopie invited him to play in a South African film titled Mayfair.

In 2018, he appeared in the South African Indian action crime film Mayfair. He played the supportive role of 'estranged son Zaid' in the film, which later received positive reviews. The film was also screened at the 62nd BFI London Film Festival and Africa in Motion Film Festival in October 2018.

Other than acting, he is also a prolific poet where he won the prestigious Roundhouse Poetry Slam, a UK competition for spoken word artists. He performs his poetry throughout the UK, and also produces poetry short films.

== Filmography ==
Year	Film	Role	Genre	Ref.
2012	Hannah	Tariq	Short film	
2012	Schemata	Derenik	Film	
2014	Three Brothers	Casting Assistant	Film	
2015	Point Break	FBI Technician	Film	
2016	Stella	Danny	TV series	
2016	The Works	Edgar	Short film	
2016	The Level	Pervaiz Quareshi	TV series	
2018	Mayfair	Zaid Randera	Film	
2019	Brexit	Leave Intern Ameet	TV movie	
