= Mayfair (film) =

2018 South African action drama film

- Directed by: Sara Blecher
- Written by: Neil McCarthy
- Produced by: Dayo Ogunyemi, Imraan Jeeva, Omar Khan
- Starring: Rajesh Gopie; Ronak Patani; Shahir Chundra
- Cinematography: Miles Goodall
- Music by: Philip Miller
- Release date: 2 November 2018
- Running time: 92 minutes
- Language: English

Mayfair is a 2018 South African Indian action crime drama film written by Neil McCarthy and directed by Sara Blecher. The film marks the fourth directorial venture for Sara Blecher and the film was set in the suburb of Johannesburg. The film stars Rajesh Gopie and Ronak Patani in the male lead roles. The film had its theatrical release on 2 November 2018 and received positive reviews. The film was also screened at the 62nd BFI London Film Festival and Africa in Motion Film Festival in October 2018.

== Cast ==
- Rajesh Gopie as Aziz
- Ronak Patani as Zaid Randera
- Shahir Chundra as Parvez
- Jack Devnarain as Jalaal
- Kelly-Eve Koopman as Ameena
- Warren Masemola as Hasan
- Wayne Van Rooyen as Mahbeer

== Synopsis ==
Zaid Randera (Ronak Patani) returns home to Mayfair in Johannesburg where his father Aziz (Rajesh Gopie), a money launderer is facing death threats from his creditors/lenders. Zaid has been dismissed from his job permanently and finds himself living under the shadow of his father whose status is marred by falling into a debt trap. When a murderous gang threatens the family business, Zaid is compelled into the life he'd hoped to leave behind.
