= Il burattino e la balena =

2024 animated short film

- Directed by: Roberto Catani
- Written by: Roberto Catani
- Music by: Enrico Ascoli
- Production companies: MIYU Productions; Withstand
- Distributed by: MIYU Distribution
- Release date: 2024
- Running time: 8 minutes
- Countries: France, Italy
- Language: no dialogue

Il burattino e la balena (English: The Puppet and the Whale) is a 2024 French-Italian.short animated film directed by Roberto Catani, produced by MIYU Productions, Withstand, and Arte France.

== Plot ==
The story of a puppet who chooses not to become a child after discovering the authoritarian drift of a society that frightens him. The film is a contemporary reinterpretation of Carlo Collodi's The Adventures of Pinocchio.

== Technique ==
The film is composed of drawings on white paper made with the traditional animated drawing technique. Each drawing is made with oilbar, chalk, pastel, and drypoint.

== Reception ==
Il burattino e la balena premiered at the 81st Venice International Film Festival.

The 8 minutes film won the Grand Prize for Short Animation at the Ottawa International Animation Festival, the SACD Award for Best French-Speaking Animation at the Clermont-Ferrand International Short Film Festival, the Grand Prix at the Insomnia International Animation Film Festival, and the Giannalberto Bendazzi Award at Animaphix New Contemporary Languages Film Festival.

Il burattino e la balena has been featured in a number of international film festival, such as the Annecy International Animation Film Festival, the Raindance Film Festival, Encounters Short Film and Animation Festival, the Tallinn Black Nights Film Festival (PÖFF), the Animafest Zagreb, the Festival Internacional de Cine en Guadalajara, the Florida Film Festival, and the Festival international du film d'animation de Bruxelles (Anima)
