= Kelly-Eve Koopman =

South African actress

- Born: Kelly-Eve Koopman; Cape Town, South Africa
- Occupations: Actress, social activist, director
- Years active: 2014–present

Kelly-Eve Koopman is a South African director and actor. She is best known for the roles in the television serials Hollywood in my Huis and Kroto and Mayfair. She is one of three directors of FEMME projects.

== Career ==
Apart from acting, she is also a community leader and social activist. She is also the co-creator of the platform 'Coloured Mentality' which has become a unique interactive storytelling space for coloured community. Over the past three years she has served 4000 young women in 20 disenfranchised schools in the Western Cape. In 2017, she released a six-part web documentary along with filmmaker Sarah Summers. The documentary focuses on the coloured racial identity in South Africa.

In 2018, she appeared in the South African Indian action crime film Mayfair. She played the supportive role of 'Ameena' in the film, which later received positive reviews. The film was also screened at the 62nd BFI London Film Festival and Africa in Motion Film Festival in October 2018.

Along with Kim Windvogel, she compiled the book They Called me Queer. In 2019, she became an author, where he wrote the Memoir Because I Couldn't Kill You.

== Filmography ==
Year	Film	Role	Genre	Ref.
2014	Hollywood in my Huis	Karma	Film	
2015	Jamillah and Aladdin	Soap Lady	TV series	
2017	Krotoa	Lysbeth	Film	
2018	Mayfair	Ameena	Film	
