= Kandasamys: The Baby =

2021 film

- Poster
- Directed by: Jayan Moodley
- Written by: Jayan Moodley; Jailoshini Naidoo; Yugan Naidoo
- Starring: Jailoshini Naidoo; Maeshni Naicker; Mariam Bassa
- Cinematography: Justus de Jager
- Edited by: Nicholas Costaras
- Music by: Chris Letcher
- Production company: Urban Vision Productions
- Distributed by: Netflix
- Release date: 20 October 2023
- Running time: 93 minutes
- Country: South Africa
- Language: English

Kandasamys: The Baby is a 2023 South African family drama film directed by Jayan Moodley, written by Jayan Moodley, Jailoshini Naidoo and Yugan Naidoo and starring Jailoshini Naidoo, Maeshni Naicker and Mariam Bassa. It is the fourth installment in the series, following Keeping Up with the Kandasamys (2017), Kandasamys: The Wedding (2019) and Trippin' with the Kandasamys (2021).

The film was released internationally on 20 October 2023 by Netflix.

== Plot ==
The Kandasamys and the Naidoos come to Mauritius to see Jodi and Prishen's new baby Arya. Their respective mothers, Jennifer and Shanti, want to take care of their granddaughter although Jodi and Prishen want to take care of the baby by themselves.

== Cast ==
- Jailoshini Naidoo as Jennifer Kandasamy
- Maeshni Naicker as Shanti Naidoo
- Mariam Bassa as Aya
- Mishqah Parthiephal as Jodi Naidoo
- Madhushan Singh as Prishen Naidoo
- Koobeshan Naidoo as Elvis Kandasamy
- Yugan Naidoo as Preggie Naidoo
- Vashir Kemraj as Desan Naidoo
- Edeen Bhugeloo as Moothoo
- Poonam Jheelan as Anjali
- Akhira Chetty as Arya Naidoo (1 year old)
  - Eliza Emryn Pillai as Arya Naidoo (newborn)
- Rushil Juglall as Arsevan
- Tesarnia Oriee as Poobasha

== Production ==
The idea for a potential fourth film came during the making of Trippin' with the Kandasamys (2021).

== Release ==
The film premiered on October 19, 2023, in Dubai one day before the start of its worldwide streaming on Netflix.

== Reception ==
Kandasamys: The Baby was released to mixed reviews from critics. A critic from News24 wrote that "Kandasamys: The Baby unexpectedly tugs at heartstrings in between the laughs and pure chaos accreditation". A critic from YoMzansi wrote that "With plenty of laughs, heartfelt tears, new characters, and relatable family dynamics, “Kandasamys: The Baby” is sure to bring joy to its viewers. It’s a heartwarming continuation of the beloved series that reminds us of the power of laughter and the enduring strength of family bonds". A critic from The Envoy Web wrote that "Kandasamys: The Baby makes a regular comedy routine a hilarious laughter ride, thanks to strong writing and good performances. Viewers might see the conclusion from a long way, but it’s a ride worth enjoying".

On the contrary, a critic from IOL wrote that "For most of the film, Kandasamys: The Baby gives you a sense that the best parts are still to come, until you reach the end and are left feeling like there should have been more, much, much more".
