= Cambridge African Film Festival =

- Hosted by: University of Cambridge
- Official website: https://www.cambridgefilmfestival.org.uk/strands/cambridge-african-film-festivalA

Cambridge African Film Festival (CAFF)is a film festival for African film in Cambridge. Founded in 2002, the festival is held annually in October or November. It is the longest running African film festival in the United Kingdom.

== History ==
Cambridge African Film Festival was founded in 2002 by a small group of graduate students at the University of Cambridge, including Lindiwe Dovey.

The 11th CAFF opened on 10 November 2012 with the Kenyan film Nairobi Half Life. the festival continued for 7 days, also screening the Senegalese film La Pirogue. In 2013 CAFF joined with three other African film festivals in the UK – Africa in Motion in Edinburgh/Glasgow, Afrika Eye in Bristol and Film Africa in London – to share features and filmmakers. The 12th CAFF was held from 3 to 7 November 2013, screening films including Judy Kibinge's Something Necessary and Alain Gomis's Tey. The 13th CAFF opened on 1 November 2014 with Abderrahmane Sissako’s Timbuktu. The 14th CAFF was held from 16 to 24 October 2015. Films included the South African film Ayanda. The 15th CAFF was held from 21 to 27 October 2016. The 16th CAFF, held in partnership with the Cambridge Film Festival, screened five African films including John Trengove's The Wound.
