= White Gold (2010 film) =

- Directed by: Jayan Moodley, Paul Railton
- Written by: Jayan Moodley
- Starring: Vignesh Sankarran, Rory Booth, Mishqah Parthiephal, Madhushan Singh, Dean O'Brian Chetty
- Cinematography: Paul Railton, Suda Singh
- Production companies: African Lotus Productions in association with Serendipity Productions and African Mediums
- Release date: 26 November 2010
- Running time: 113 minutes
- Country: South Africa
- Languages: Tamil, Hindi, English

White Gold is a 2010 South African film, directed by Jayan Moodley and Paul Railton, produced by African Lotus Productions in association with Serendipity Productions and African Mediums. Its release was timed to coincide with the celebrations of the 150th anniversary of Indian presence in South Africa. The film is a historical drama revolving around the experiences of Indian indentured labourers recruited for the sugar plantations of the 19th-century Colony of Natal, and their children and grandchildren. Jayan Moodley, who wrote the script and co-directed, was inspired by her own family history.
