= Shahir Chundra =

South African director, actor and media personality (born 1980)

- Born: Shahir Chundra; May 27, 1980 (age 46); Pietermaritzburg, South Africa
- Other name: Shaz
- Education: AFDA, The School for the Creative Economy
- Occupations: Director, actor, writer, producer
- Years active: 1993–present
- Height: 1.8 m (5 ft 11 in)

Shahir 'Shaz' Chundra (born 27 May 1980), is a South African Indian actor and filmmaker, producer and musician. He is best known for his acting roles in the television serials Isidingo, Homeland and Bedford Wives. and his directing roles on The Bachelor SA S1 and as showrunner on the international Netflix hit Young, Famous & African S1 and S2.

== Personal life ==
He was born on 27 May 1980 in Pietermaritzburg, KwaZulu-Natal, South Africa to an Indian family.

== Career ==
He started acting at the age of 5 as a child actor. At the age 17, he started a degree in filmmaking at AFDA, The School for the Creative Economy in Johannesburg. After graduation, he directed popular South African SABC youth culture shows including; Street Journal and Kasi 101 and Noted. During this period, he worked as a writer of South African sitcoms: My Perfect Family and Majakhatata Records. In 2011 he moved to USA and studied acting at the New York Film Academy.

He became the content director on Survivor South Africa Champions and Masterchef Season 3. Then he became the Head of Content on Power Couple South Africa. As a Series Director, he made several notable programs such as Reality Check and Bootcamp Msanzi Celebrity Edition and Zavion season 1. He is also a musician who worked as the lead singer of the rock band, 'MadLove', where he participated in 3 online number 1 singles.

In 2005, he appeared in the television serial Isidingo where he played the role Officer Brown in two episodes. The show became highly popular and continued until 2012. He also made the acting appearance in the serials: 7de Laan and Entabeni. In 2014, he starred in the Emmy award-winning international series Homeland season 4, where he played the role 'Infantry Major' in the episode "Krieg Nicht Lieb". In 2017, he played the lead villain, 'Raj Pillay' in the serial Bedford Wives aired on SABC 3. In the same year, he acted in the film An Act Of Defiance.

In 2018, he appeared in the South African Indian action crime film Mayfair. He played the supportive role of 'Parvez' in the film, which later received positive reviews. The film was also screened at the 62nd BFI London Film Festival and Africa in Motion Film Festival in October 2018.

In 2019, he acted in the 3 Days to Go and played the supporting role 'Roy'. The film had its theatrical release on 25 January 2019. In 2019, he became the Series Director on television series The Bachelor.

In 2021 he became the showrunner on Netflix worldwide hit, their first South African original reality show, Young, Famous & African and went on to showrun S2 and thereafter was the co-executive producer of The Ultimatum S1.

== Filmography ==
Year	Film	Role	Genre	Ref.
2005–12	Isidingo: The Need	Officer Brown	TV series	
2008	Entabeni	Officer Cole	TV mini-series	
2014	Homeland	Infantry Major	TV series	
2017	An Act of Defiance	Mac Maharaj	Film	
2018	Mayfair	Parvez	Film	
2019	The Bachelor	Director	TV series	
2019	3 Days to Go	Roy	Film	
2019	Bedford Wives	Raj	TV Series	
