= Keeping Up with the Kandasamys =

South African Indian comedy film

- Directed by: Jayan Moodley
- Screenplay by: Rory Booth; Jayan Moodley
- Produced by: Helena Spring; Junaid Ahmed
- Starring: Jailoshini Naidoo; Maeshni Naicker; Madhushan Singh; Mishqah Parthiephal
- Cinematography: Justus de Jager
- Music by: Chris Letcher
- Production company: African Lotus Productions
- Release date: 3 March 2017
- Running time: 90 minutes
- Country: South Africa
- Language: English
- Box office: R16 million

Keeping Up with the Kandasamys (or simply Kandasamys) is a 2017 South African comedy film directed by Jayan Moodley, and was the first South African Indian film to be screened widely in theaters. It stars Jailoshini Naidoo, Maeshni Naicker, Madhushan Singh, and Mishqah Parthiephal. The film grossed over R4 million at the box office in its first week and went on to gross over R16 million (US$1 million), becoming the highest-grossing film in South Africa for the year, and the highest grossing South African film worldwide in 2017. It also featured in film festivals in North America. The film's name is a reference to the American reality television series Keeping Up with the Kardashians.

== Plot ==
Shanti Naidoo is the typical Indo-South African mother. Overbearing and overprotective, she dotes on her family, and is well known in the community for her generosity and great cooking. Her life would be just fine, except that her neighbour, Jennifer Kandasamy, always seems to hold the upper hand. Intelligent, elegant, and classy, the career driven Jennifer always manages to out-do whatever Shanti does, and life for the two women appears to be a constant battle of trying to keep up with each other. When Jennifer realizes that her daughter Jodi is in love with Shanti's son Prishen, she is determined to break them up. But, in order to do that, she will have to enlist her rival's help.

== Cast ==
- Madhushan Singh as Prishen Naidoo, Jodi's boyfriend, Preggie and Shanti Naidoo's son, and Desan's brother
- Mishqah Parthiephal as Jodi Kandasamy, Prishen's girlfriend, Elvis and Jennifer's daughter and Aya's granddaughter
- Jailoshini Naidoo as Jennifer Kandasamy, Elvis's wife, Jodi's mother, Aya's daughter-in-law, and Shanti's old school friend
- Maeshni Naicker as Shanti Naidoo, Preggie's wife, Prishen and Desan's mother, and Jennifer's old school friend
- Koobeshan Naidoo as Elvis Kandasamy, Jennifer's husband, Jodi's father, and Aya's son.
- Rajesh Gopie as Preggie Naidoo, Shanti's husband and Prishen and Desan's father
- Mariam Bassa as Aya Kandasamy, Elvis's mother, Jennifer's mother-in-law, and Jodi's granny
- Vashir Kemraj as Desan, Preggie and Shanti's son and Prishen's younger brother
- Neil Govender as Marlin, Jody's best friend and also an events organiser
- Rushil Juglall as Arsevan, worker of Marlin's and DJ at Aya's birthday party
- Bobby Nihar Bhagwandas as dom
- Matthew Isiah Pillay as dommer

== Reception ==
The film received mixed reviews from film critics, who applauded the film for its showcasing of the South African Indian community, as well as its unexpected impact on the local film industry. Jared Beukes of Huffpost gave it a positive review, praising Moodley's "heartfelt intent" for the film and Jailoshini Naidoo's performance. Gabi Zietsman of Channel 24 gave the film a 3/5 rating, acclaiming the film for its portrayal of a "Rainbow Nation" that is not often represented in South African media. Zietsman went on to praise Moodley and writer Rory Booth's screenplay, stating that the duo "work great as a team and produced an entertaining comedy that will make you scream with laughter." He also singled out Naidoo's performance for praise stating that "can't help but wonder why we haven’t seen them in more movies." Writing for the Independent Online, Paul Eksteen gave the film a warm review, stating that "Despite the universal, and very rom-com aesthetic of this film, it is likely to find its greatest appeal within the community it celebrates. There, the little quirks that drew so many laughs at the screening I attended will draw the most appreciation. It helps if you’re in on the joke." Haji Mohamed Dawjee of Eyewitness News stated that "[the] terrible writing and misfired humor made it an exhausting viewing experience, and more than that, the movie missed out on a massive chance to educate communities in South Africa residing outside of Chatsworth."

== Awards ==
Award Title	Actor/Actress Name	Award Ceremony	Result
Best Actress Film	Maeshni Naicker	Simon Sabela 2018	Won
Best Actress Film	Jailoshini Naidoo	Simon Sabela 2018	Nominated
Best Supporting Actor Film	Madhushan Singh	Simon Sabela 2018	Won
Best Supporting Actor Film	Rajesh Gopie	Simon Sabela 2018	Nominated
Best Supporting Actress Film	Mishqah Parthiphal	Simon Sabela 2018	Nominated
Best Film	Jayan Moodley	Simon Sabela 2018	Nominated
Best Director Film	Jayan Moodley	Simon Sabela 2018	Nominated
Best use of KZN as a Filming location	Jayan Moodley	Simon Sabela 2018	Nominated

== Sequels ==
Following the success of the film, in July 2018, Jayan Moodley, the director of Keeping Up with the Kandasamys, announced a sequel called Kandasamys: The Wedding. A trailer was released in December 2018.

A third movie Trippin' with the Kandasamys released exclusively on Netflix on 4 June 2021. A fourth movie Kandasamys: The Baby released exclusively on Netflix on 20 October 2023.
