= Truro (ship) =

Ship of Indian indentured workers in 1860

Truro was the ship from Madras carrying the first 342 indentured Indian laborers to arrive in Port Natal (present-day Durban) on 16 November 1860. The second group of 342 arrived in Durban on board Belvedere from Calcutta 10 days later. Indian laborers were recruited to work on sugar plantations by the South African government. In 2011, on the 150th anniversary South African government announced plans to launch a series of postal stamps to commemorate this.

The last ship, Umlazi, arrived in 1911. Passenger lists have been made available online.
