= Watershed, Bristol =

Media centre in Bristol, England

Watershed
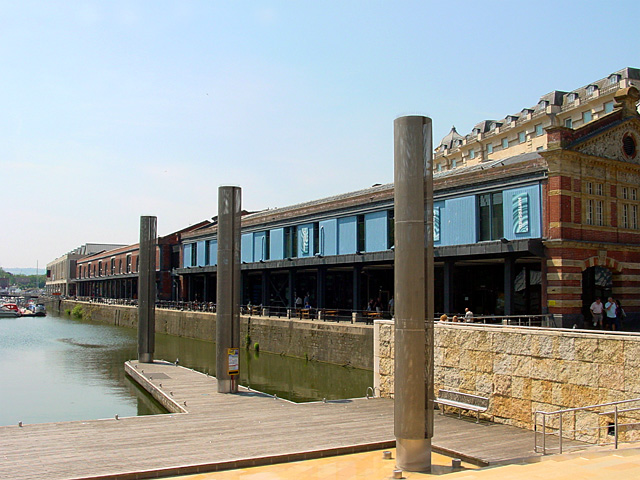
- Watershed

- Location of Watershed in Bristol
- Established: 1982
- Location: 1, Canons Road, Harbourside, Bristol
- Coordinates: 51.4515°N 2.5980°W
- Type: Cinema, Culture & Technology, Cafe & Bar, Conferencing
- Director: Clare Reddington
- Public transit access: Bus, ferry
- Website: www.watershed.co.uk

Watershed opened in June 1982 as the United Kingdom's first dedicated media centre. Based in former warehouses on the harbourside at Bristol, it hosts three cinemas, a café/bar, events/conferencing spaces, the Pervasive Media Studio, and office spaces for administrative and creative staff. It occupies the former E and W sheds on Canon's Road at Saint Augustine's Reach, and underwent a major refurbishment in 2005. The building also hosts UWE eMedia Business Enterprises, Most of Watershed's facilities are situated on the second floor of two of the transit sheds. The conference spaces and cinemas are used by many public and private sector organisations and charities. Watershed employs the equivalent of over seventy full-time staff and has an annual turnover of approximately £3.8 million. As well as its own commercial income (through Watershed Trading), Watershed Arts Trust is funded by national and regional arts funders.

A 2010 report for the International Futures Forum describes the Watershed as "a creative ecosystem, operating in many different and overlapping economies," which is "pushing the creative boundary" by fostering both the invention and consolidation of new work.

== History ==
The centre opened in 1982, in an area of the city which was then mainly derelict. The transit sheds, dating from 1894, had fallen into disrepair but had Grade II listed building status. By 2004, it was attracting more than half a million visitors per year. A major refurbishment in 2004/5 cost £2 million, creating a third cinema, extending the café/bar and making the building more accessible. Patrons could sponsor seats in the new cinema, and the first to take advantage of this was the film and television actor Pete Postlethwaite.

== Film ==
In addition to its world/arts film programme, Watershed has played host to (and helped organise and run) many film festivals, including RESFest 2002, Depict!, Brief Encounters (now Encounters Short Film and Animation Festival), the Lesbian and Gay Film Festival, Black Pyramid, Latin America Week, VisionSign (celebrating deaf moving image culture), and Slapstick Film Festival. Wildscreen, a festival of wildlife documentaries and related films, began at the Watershed as did Afrika Eye (an annual festival of African Cinema), in 2005.

Regular activities include evening classes, special film events, a film discussion group - Cinephiles, and educational screenings with introductions and documentation. British Film Institute touring programmes are regularly screened. The Keeping it Reel Series aimed at 12- to 15-year-olds has, since 1997, offered young people the chance to discover what happens behind the scenes in the film industry. It was launched in 1997 by Paul McGann and featured lectures & seminars by local actor Christopher Morris, Shawn Sobers of HTV, filmmaker Fergus Colville, Casualty make up artist, Chrissie Powell and EastEnders executive producer Matthew Robinson. The BFI Film Academy Bristol is aimed at 16-19-year olds.

In 2000, The Independent on Sunday's list of "five of the best indie cinemas" put the Watershed at the top, citing its wide-ranging, international programme. A 2002 poll for The Guardian rated the Watershed as Britain's fifth-most popular independent cinema.

== Digital media ==
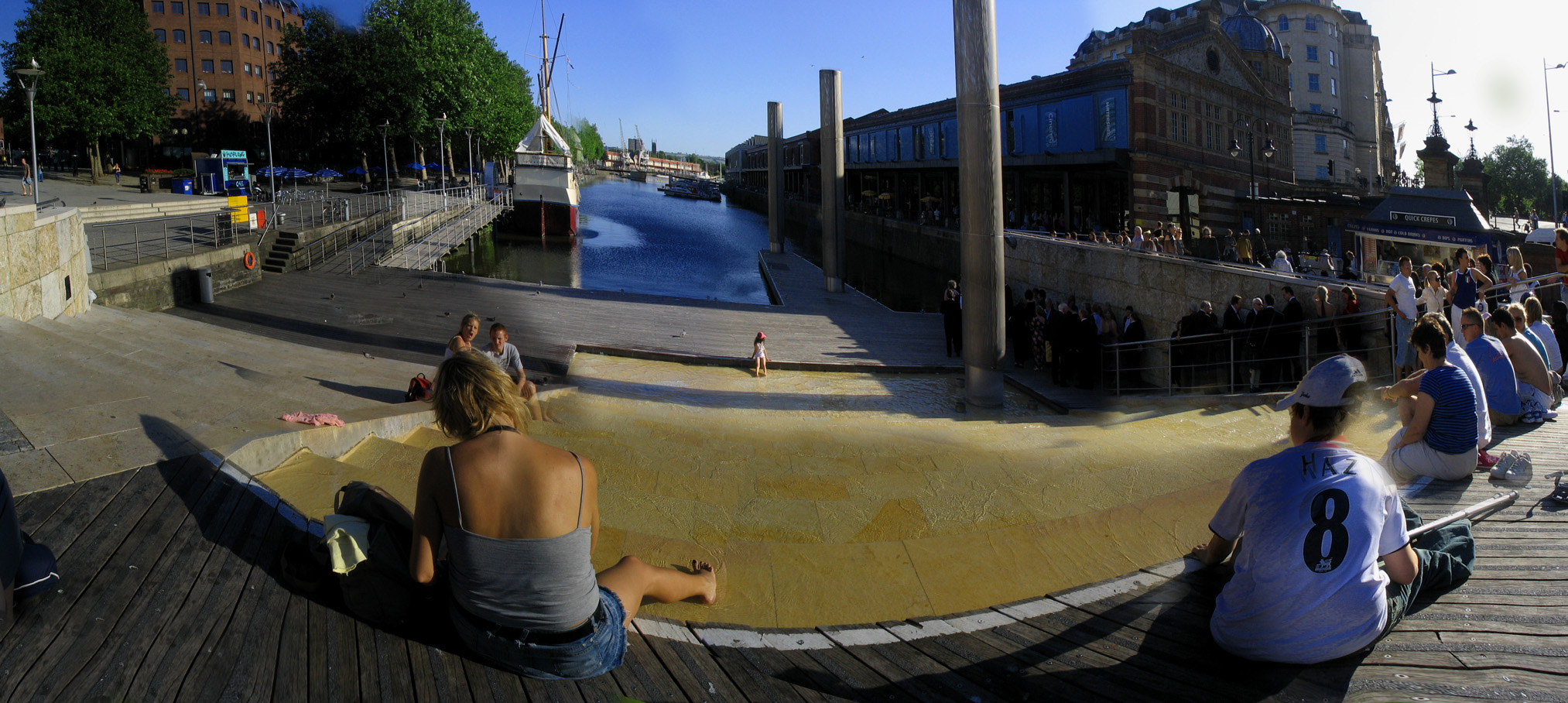
The watershed building and harbour

Watershed is more than just an arts cinema. It is at once a cultural centre, a business broker, a social networker, a research and innovation facility, a café/bar, and a cultural tourist attraction.

For the first twenty years of its existence, the Watershed concentrated on film and photography. In the 21st century it has increasingly taken up online media and multimedia, to the point that it has more visitors online than in person.

In the digital domain, Watershed's dShed.net website displays digital art from international artists alongside work by local community groups. It hosts the annual online short-film festival Depict.org, selecting "micro films" (no more than ninety seconds long) from around the world, giving a cash prize to the winner. In 2006, eShed.net began development as a showcase for digital art made by young people in and around Bristol. Staff at Watershed were also involved with creating and running electricpavilion.org, electricdecember.org and bristolstories.org.

Dshed.net provides a platform for artists, communities and producers to explore various forms of new media experimentation and collaboration. DShed.net hosts online videos of some of the talks at Watershed, project resources and short original digital productions. ElectricDecember.org is an annual online advent calendar which has run since 1999.

Watershed subsidiary, iShed, was established in 2007 to produce creative collaborations, support new ideas, explore emerging technologies and develop talent. In 2016, iShed was folded into Pervasive Media Studio and renamed iShed Ventures. iShed's portfolio includes commissioning schemes, events, research and consultancy produced through local, national and international partnerships with industry, artists and universities. Its main activities are the Sandbox funding schemes Media Sandbox and Theatre Sandbox. iShed also runs The Pervasive Media Studio, a partnership between Watershed, HP Labs and UWE set up to support interdisciplinary research and development. The Pervasive Media Studio was previously located in the Leadworks building in Anchor Square Bristol until 2011, when it moved to the Watershed building.
