= The Indian Detective =

Canadian crime comedy-drama series

- Genre: Comedy; Police procedural Mystery; Crime
- Created by: Frank Spotnitz; Smita Bhide
- Starring: Russell Peters; Anupam Kher; William Shatner; Christina Cole; Mishqah Parthiephal
- Country of origin: Canada
- Original language: English
- No. of episodes: 4

Production
- Producer: Trevor Hopkins
- Production locations: Mumbai, India; Cape Town, South Africa; Toronto, Ontario, Canada
- Running time: 44-46 minutes
- Production company: CTV

Original release
- Network: CTV
- Release: 23 November – 14 December 2017

The Indian Detective is a Canadian crime comedy-drama series which debuted on CTV and Netflix in 2017. The show stars Russell Peters as Doug D'Mello, a police officer from Toronto who becomes embroiled in a murder investigation while visiting his father (Anupam Kher) in Mumbai during a one-month suspension for incompetence. The fourth episode ended in a cliffhanger, hinting at a possible second season; while Peters has stated at various times that a second season was in the works, none has been officially announced as of September 2019.

As of January 2020, Peters entered a partnership with Amazon Prime with the comedic special "Russell Peters: Deported," possibly delaying season 2 of The Indian Detective even further.

== Production ==
The Canadian scenes of The Indian Detective were filmed on location in Toronto, and in surrounding areas in Ontario. The Canadian border crossing scenes were filmed at Canadian Tire Motorsport Park, and some of the Indian scenes were actually filmed in Cape Town, South Africa.

At the 7th Canadian Screen Awards in 2019, the series won the Golden Screen Award as the highest-rated Canadian television program of 2018.

== Cast and characters ==
- Russell Peters as Douglas "Doug" D'Mello
- Anupam Kher as Stanley D'Mello
- William Shatner as David Marlowe
- Christina Cole as Robyn "Bob" Gerner
- Mishqah Parthiephal as Priya Sehgal
- Hamza Haq as Gopal
- Deepti Jal Singh as Seema
- Nathan Dales as Agent Shamansky
- Veena Sood as Malika
- Angelo Tsarouchas as Informant in car

== Episodes ==
| No. overall | No. in season | Title | Directed by | Written by | Original release date | Viewers (millions) |
|---|---|---|---|---|---|---|
| 1 | 1 | "Episode 1" | Sandy Johnson | Frank Spotnitz & Smita Bhide | November 23, 2017 | 2.12 |
A Toronto police officer gets embroiled in a murder investigation while visiting his father in Mumbai.
| 2 | 2 | "Episode 2" | Sandy Johnson | Frank Spotnitz & Smita Bhide | November 30, 2017 | 1.54 |
Priya introduces Doug to a case of a missing Canadian traveler; Doug learns the location of the missing girl.
| 3 | 3 | "Episode 3" | Sandy Johnson | Frank Spotnitz & Smita Bhide | December 7, 2017 | 1.28 |
The violent death of an innocent man at the hands of one of Gopal's henchmen allows Doug and Priya to infiltrate his inner circle.
| 4 | 4 | "Episode 4" | Sandy Johnson | Frank Spotnitz & Smita Bhide | December 14, 2017 | 1.26 |
In a desperate race against time in order to save thousands of lives, Doug and Robyn embark on a dangerous mission in the season finale.
