= Simoné Nortmann =

South African actress and filmmaker (born 1990)

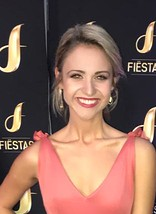
- Nortmann in 2018
- Born: 18 May 1990 (age 36); Pretoria, South Africa
- Education: Stellenbosch University
- Occupation: Actress
- Years active: 2013–present
- Spouse: Andries Levi Pretorius (m. 2019)
- Children: Harper Pretorius
- Awards: Tallgrass International Film Festival (2017); Huisgenoot Tempo Awards (2017)
- Website: simonenortmann.com

Simoné Pretorius (née Nortmann; born 18 May 1990) is a South African actress, director, screenwriter and producer. As an actress Pretorius is best known for portraying Irma Humpel in the 2016 Afrikaans biographical film Vir die voëls, for which she gained prominence and international recognition. In 2024 she makes her screenwriting and directorial debut for the award-winning, "Som van Twee", that won seven awards at the Cape Town Silwerskerm festival, including for Best Director and Best Screenplay. ^{[3]}

== Early life ==
Simoné is born on 18 May 1990 in Pretoria, South Africa. Both her parents served in the South African Air Force. Her father, Hannes Nortmann, served in the South African Border War and was awarded the Honoris Crux Award for bravery in 1988. Her mother, Tinkie Nortmann, noticed her daughter's passion for acting when she one day climbed on top of KFC’s counter and started performing for the patrons. Pretorius was a natural leader and achiever in her school years, serving as Headgirl in Primary School as well as her High School, Hoërskool Centurion, and passing matric with seven distinctions. She went on to earn a BDram degree in Theatre Studies from Stellenbosch University and serving on the Student Representative Council in 2012.

== Career ==
=== Film ===
In 2015 she attends a three-week acting workshop led by Academy Award nominee and Broadway regular, Diane Venora, in California. Shortly after returning to South Africa she lands her first film role as the lead, Irma Humpel, in Huisgenoot Magazine's award-winning biopic, "Vir die Voëls" (2016) for which she received her first international nod by winning Best Actress at Tallgrass International Film Festival in 2017. Pretorius also won Best Actress for the same film at the Tempo Awards in 2017. She subsequently went on to star in South African box office hits and international film festival winning films "Vuil Wasgoed" (2017), "Stroomop" (2018), "Wonderlus" (2018), and "Vlugtig" (2020). She makes her international acting debut in Hallmark's "A Safari Romance" as antagonist, Amy Bradshaw in 2023. She also plays Jolene in Showmax's, "Die Onderonsie".

She makes her debut as film director and screenwriter in 2024 for the film, "Som van Twee" that premieres at the Silwerskerm festival in Camps Bay. She also co-produces the film with Dries Scholtz under her own production company, Second Circle Films. The film walks away with ten nominations as well as seven wins, including for Best Film.

=== Television ===
Pretorius made her television debut in the popular Afrikaans soap 7de Laan in 2013 as Nadia Croukamp for which she was awarded Best Newcomer at the Royalty Soapie Awards (2014). Pretorius's television credits also include Kyknet's popular mockumentary, "Hotel" for which she has been nominated for Best Actress in a Comedy twice at the South African Film and Television Awards. She also starred as Sr. René Spies in local soap, "Binnelanders" (2018 - 2020). Thereafter Simoné starred as Krizanda in "Swartwater" (2020), Chanel in MNET's telenovela, "Legacy" (2022) and a lead in KykNET's procedurial drama, "Hartklop", as Dr Elani Breytenbach (2023).

=== Theatre ===
Her theatre credits include Liesl von Trapp in "The Sound of Music" at the Wellington Theatre in 2011, Nina in one woman play "Los Asseblief 'n Boodskap" which showcased at various festivals throughout South Africa in 2017 and 2018, and "Wat As", directed by André Odendaal for Innibos festival in 2021.

=== Additional work ===
In 2018, she starred alongside former rugby player, Joe Breytenbach in the music video, "Rooilipsoene" by Karlien van Jaarsveld.

== Awards and nominations ==
| Year | Award | Category | Work | Result |
|---|---|---|---|---|
| 2014 | Royalty Soapie Awards | Best Newcomer | 7de Laan | Nominated |
| 2015 | You Tempo Awards | Best Newcomer | 7de Laan | Nominated |
| 2017 | Tallgrass International Film Festival | Best Actress | For The Birds | Won |
| 2017 | Huisgenoot Tempo Awards | Best Actress | Vir die Voëls | Won |
| 2018 | South African Film and Television Awards (SAFTAS) | Best Actress in a Comedy | Hotel | Nominated |
| 2023 | South African Film and Television Awards (SAFTAS) | Best Actress in a Comedy | Hotel | Nominated |
| 2024 | Silwerskermfees | Best Screenplay | Som van Twee | Won |
| 2024 | Silwerskermfees | Best Directing | Som van Twee | Won |

== Coaching ==
Pretorius started her own acting workshop in 2017 called Art of Acting South Africa. She continues to present her three-day workshop across South Africa.

== Personal life ==
She is married to Andries Levi Pretorius, a property developer and co-director of property development company, Bow and Arc. They have two children: Harper and James.

== See also ==
- List of South African actors
- Great South Africans
- Charlize Theron
