= Trippin' with the Kandasamys =

2021 film

- Poster
- Directed by: Jayan Moodley
- Written by: Rory Booth; Jayan Moodley
- Starring: Jailoshini Naidoo; Maeshni Naicker; Mariam Bassa
- Edited by: Nicholas Costaras
- Music by: Chris Letcher
- Production company: Urban Vision Productions
- Distributed by: Netflix
- Release date: 4 June 2021
- Running time: 93 minutes
- Country: South Africa
- Language: English

Trippin' with the Kandasamys is a 2021 South African film directed by Jayan Moodley, written by Rory Booth and Jayan Moodley and starring Jailoshini Naidoo, Maeshni Naicker and Mariam Bassa. It's the third installment in the series, following Keeping Up with the Kandasamys and Kandasamys: The Wedding.

== Cast ==
- Jailoshini Naidoo as Jennifer Kandasamy
- Maeshni Naicker as Shanti Naidoo
- Mariam Bassa as Aya Kandasamy
- Koobeshan Naidoo as Elvis Kandasamy
- Yugan Naidoo as Preggie Naidoo
- Mishqah Parthiephal as Jodi Kandasamy Naidoo
- Madhushan Singh as Prishen Naidoo
- Uraysha Ramrachia as Baby Naidoo
- Rushil Juglall as Arsevan
- Tesarnia Oree as Poobasha

== Release ==
The film was released internationally on 4 June 2021 by Netflix.

== Reception ==
Trippin with the Kandasamys was released to positive reviews from critics, with Mariam Bassa's and Jailoshini Naidoo's performances receiving praise. The New York Post film review website Decider stated that "the jokes are fun, especially the ones delivered by Bassa", and praised the performances of Jailoshini Naidoo and Maeshni Naicker as "winning and funny in their roles at the helm of the film". Hollywood Insider praised the film's cinematography and the chemistry of the lead cast, but felt the film dragged in some moments. News24 rated the film 3 out of 5 stars and praised the "incredible comedic duo" of Naidoo and Naicker and Bass's "gambling grandmother's unexpected wit and wisdom".

== Sequel ==
The film had a sequel Kandasamys: The Baby, which was released in 2023.
