= Kandasamys: The Wedding =

2019 South African Indian romantic comedy film

- Directed by: Jayan Moodley
- Screenplay by: Rory Booth; Jayan Moodley
- Starring: Jailoshini Naidoo; Maeshni Naicker; Madhushan Singh; Mishqah Parthiephal
- Cinematography: Justus de Jager
- Music by: Chris Letcher
- Production company: African Lotus Productions
- Release date: 18 April 2019
- Running time: 127 minutes
- Language: English
- Box office: R18.9 million

Kandasamys: The Wedding is a 2019 South African Indian romantic comedy drama film written by Rory Booth and Jayan Moodley and directed by Jayan Moodley. The film is a sequel to the 2017 blockbuster box office hit film Keeping Up with the Kandasamys and stars Jailoshini Naidoo, Maeshni Naicker, Madhushan Singh and Mishqah Parthiephal.

The film had its theatrical release across 41 local theatres on 18 April 2019 and gained extremely positive reviews from the audience. The film became a success at the box office similar to its prequel and was rated as one of the best African films of 2019.

== Synopsis ==
The plot revolves around the forthcoming wedding of Jodi (Mishqah Parthiepal) and Prishen (Madushan Singh), but the mothers of both bride Jodi and the bridegroom Prishen, Jennifer Kandasamy (Jailoshini Naidoo) and Shanthi Naidoo (Maeshni Naicker) attempt to push their own demands and agendas for the big Wedding Day.

== Cast ==
- Jailoshini Naidoo as Jennifer Kandasamy
- Maeshni Naicker as Shanthi Naidoo
- Madhushan Singh as Prishen Naidoo
- Mishqah Parthiephal as Jodi Kandasamy
- Yugan Naidoo as Preggie Naidoo
- Mariam Bassa as Kaunam 'Aya' Kandasamy
- Koobeshen Naidoo as Elvis Kandasamy
- Bassy Bhola as Rogers Kandasamy
- Rushil Juglall as Arsevan
- Tesarnia Oree as Poobasha
- 5FM DJ Sureshnie Rider as herself (special appearance)
- Dawn Thandeka King (special appearance)

== Production ==
Following the success of Keeping Up with the Kandasamys, in July 2018, director Jayan Moodley made an announcement regarding the making of a sequel to the film. The principal photography of the film began in September 2018 and the portions of the film were predominantly set in Kwa-Zulu Natal while few scenes were also shot in a market near Verulam. The official trailer of the film was unveiled in December 2018.

== Reception ==
A critic from News24 wrote that "The sequel takes it up a notch, with even more South African Indian humour mixed in with drama and family politics. The writers also took a bold step by including amusing one-liners that may make you cringe if you’re watching this with your parents – dirty jokes are not discussed with Indian parents – but it’s all in the name of fun".

== Sequel ==
A sequel, Trippin' with the Kandasamys, was released on 4 June 2021.
