= Lizelle Bisschoff =

South African film theorist and festival founder

- Education: University of Johannesburg, University of Edinburgh, University of Stirling
- Employer: University of Glasgow
- Organization: Africa in Motion (AiM) film festival

Lizelle Bisschoff is a South African film theorist, academic, curator and the founder of the Africa in Motion (AiM) film festival in Scotland which showcases African cinema.

== Biography ==
Bisschoff was born in South Africa.

She studied at the University of Johannesburg then moved to the United Kingdom to study a masters degree at the University of Edinburgh. She holds a PhD from the University of Stirling. She works as a Professor in Film Studies at the University of Glasgow.

In 2006, Bisschoff founded and directed the annual Africa in Motion (AiM) film festival in Scotland. It is the United Kingdom's largest African film festival, has screened over 500 African films and takes place in both Glasgow and Edinburgh towards the end of October each year. AiM gained charitable status in 2012 and is now run as a not-for-profit organisation and governed by a formally appointed Board of Trustees.

== Publications ==
Bisschoff has researched filmmaking in sub-Saharan Africa, Southern Africa, West Africa, and East Africa. She has referred to Hyenas (1992) by Senegalese director Djibril Diop Mambety as her favourite African film.

In 2012, she contributed to Storytelling in World Cinemas, Volume 1.

A series called "Recovering Lost African Film Classics" curated by Bisschoff and David Murphy at the AiM festival lead to the publication of Africa's Lost Classics: New Histories of African Cinema in 2017, which highlights indigenous African filmmaking.

In 2016, Bisschoff co-wrote Art and Trauma in Africa: Representations of Reconciliation in Music, Visual Arts, Literature, and Film with Stefanie Van de Peer. It is the first book to look exclusively at art and trauma in African contexts. In 2019, she published Women in African Cinema: Beyond the Body Politic.

Bisschoff was a guest editor of the "decolonising film education" special issue of the Film Education Journal (2022), alongside Jyoti Mistry.

In 2024, she co-edited Stretching the Archives: Decolonising Global Women’s Film Heritage.
