= Soromini Kallichurum =

Doctor

- Born: 1932; Ladysmith, KwaZulu-Natal, South Africa
- Died: 21 December, 2002 (aged 69–70)
- Medical career
- Profession: Doctor

Soromini Kallichurum (1932 – 21 December 2002) was a South African medical doctor and medical school professor, the first woman to serve as Dean of the medical faculty at the University of KwaZulu-Natal.

== Early life ==
Soromini Kallichurum was born in Ladysmith, KwaZulu-Natal. Her father, S. Kallichurum, was a teacher. In 1950, she was one of the first twelve undergraduates enrolled in the "non-white" section at the University of Natal. She earned her medical degree there in 1957, and also held a D.M., earned in 1967 for her research on lung disease in black South Africans.

== Career ==
Kallichurum was a medical researcher through the 1960s. She was in private practice as a pathologist for part of the 1970s, then in 1978 she was selected as chair of the anatomical pathology department at the University of Natal, the first woman to hold that position. In 1984, she was appointed dean of the medical faculty, again as the first woman, and also as the first non-white person in that rank. She retired as a professor in 1994, to become president of the Interim Medical and Dental Council of South Africa, and was still its president when its name changed to the Health Professions Council of South Africa. During that eight-year tenure, she oversaw the organization's changes in response to the end of apartheid. She stepped down from that work in 2002, the year she died.

== Personal life ==
Soromini Kallichurum married Karoonduth Rughubar, a teacher and later a school principal, while she was in medical school. They had three daughters, Karuna, Ishana, and Ramona. She died in 2002, aged 70 years.
