= Mandisi Arnold Shindo =

Dr Disi
- Born: 3 May 1989 (age 37); Khayelitsha, South Africa
- Known for: Theatre

Mandisi Sindo (born 1989, stage name Dr Disi) is a South African actor, writer, director, voice artist and dance performer, and the founder of the Theatre4Change Arts Project, KASI RC – Khayelitsha Art School and Rehabilitation Centre & Umjita Entertainment. He began pursuing his passion for theatre, along with his best friend Abongile Krozaat, aged 11 in primary school, and since then has dedicated his life to the arts and to helping young people gain the skills for a tertiary level education. He views the teaching of drama as "(his) calling and weapon to teach those who are not getting the formal classroom teaching."

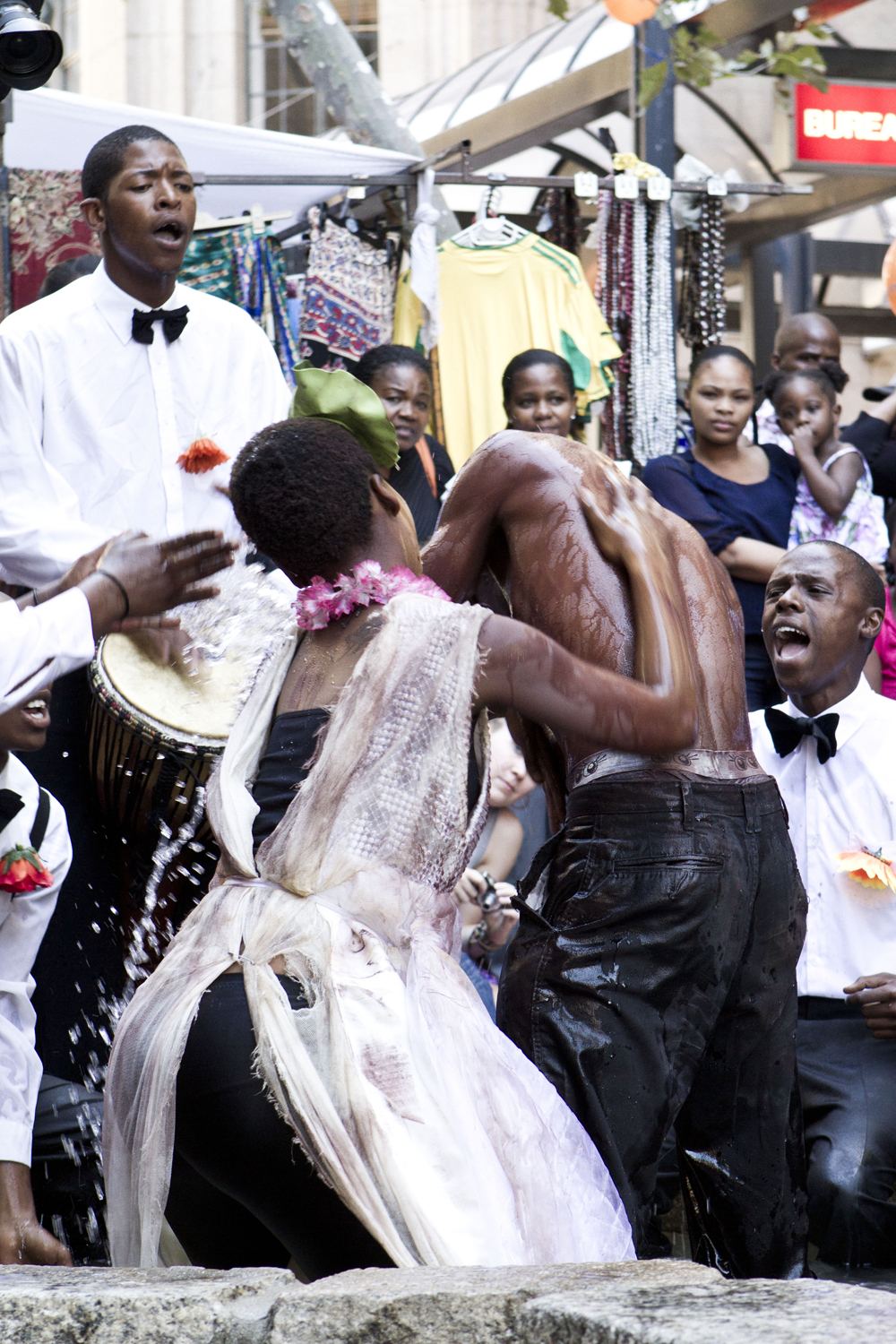
Infecting The City 2012, The Sacrifice

== Career ==
=== Education ===
Sindo studied his (Diploma) in Theatre and Performance at the University of Cape Town majoring in Community Theatre making.

Went to further his education and graduated with BA Honors in Applied Drama and Theatre at Wits University.

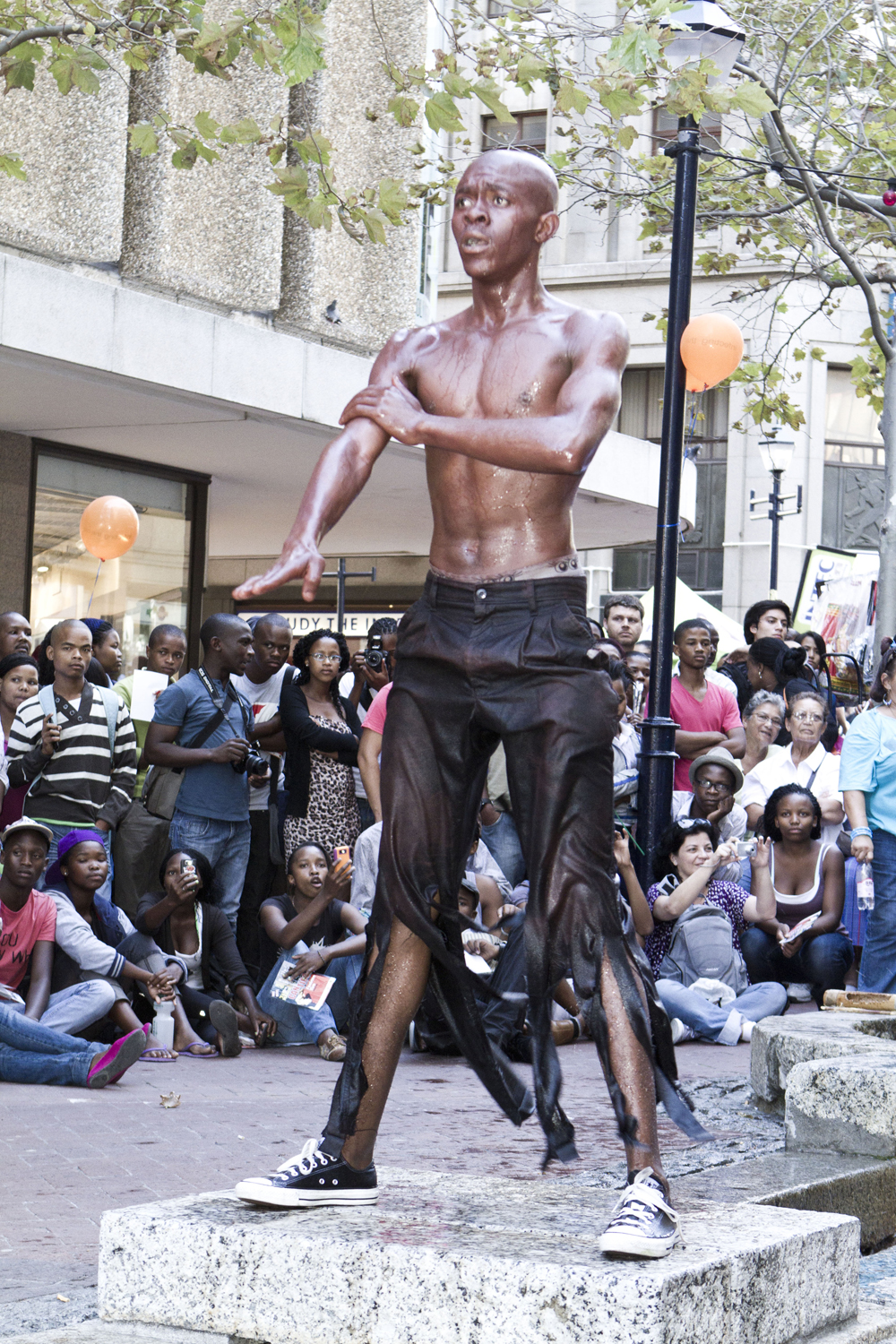
Infecting The City 2012, The Sacrifice

Sindo proceeded to do Masters in the Arts, Applied Drama and Theatre (Decolonizing Theatee Norms) Wits Universal

He is a South African Shack Theatres Innovator and Originator.

=== Performances ===
- Macbeki by Pieter Dick Uys, dir by Chris Weare Uct Little Theatre and India
- Burnt By Ina and Ian Bruce
- Home Brew By Sabata Sesiu
- Opera 5:20 by Geoff Hyland Baxter 2010
- Isivuno Sama Phupha by Mandla Mbothwe
- The Lesson by Eugène Ionesco dir by Geoff Hyland performed: America Boston 2011
- Bokumka Bonke By Cast Directed By Mandla Mbothwe
- Living under pressure ( which he wrote, directed and performed)
