= Jack Devnarain =

South African actor

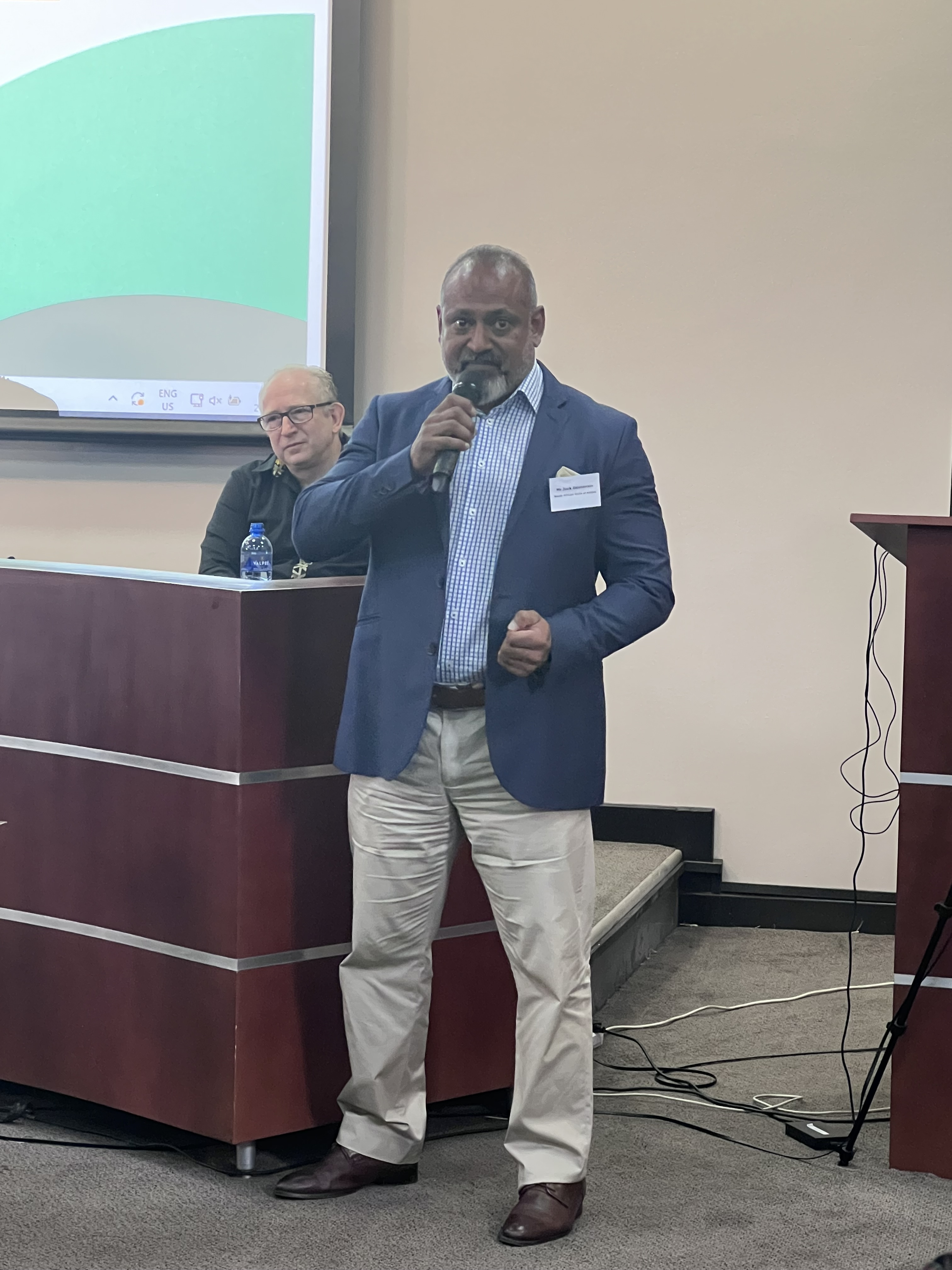
- Devnarain speaking at Copyright and Public Interest, Africa and the Global South Conference
- Born: Jack Devnarain; 9 February 1971 (age 55); Tongaat, South Africa
- Occupation: Actor
- Years active: 1993–present
- Website: http://www.jackdevnarain.co.za

Jack Devnarain (born 9 February 1971) is a South African actor. He is best known for the roles in the television serials The Ghost and the Darkness, Isidingo and Mayfair.

== Personal life ==
He was born on 9 February 1971 in Tongaat (now oThongathi), KwaZulu-Natal, South Africa. His mother was a drama teacher.

He is married to Pam Devnarain and is a father of two children.

== Career ==
He started his acting career in Durban through the community theatre circuit. During this period, he studied law at the University of KZN and graduated in 1993. In 1996, he made his acting debut in the film The Ghost and the Darkness with a minor role. Then in 1998, he appeared in the popular television serial Isidingo with a supportive role 'Rajesh Kumar' which became very popular. After graduation, he served in the Police Service for nine years until 2003 in the Rapid Response and Crime Prevention units where he was famous for his arrests and convictions. However, he continued to appear in television, cinema and theater during his busy lawful life.

In 2002, he moved to Johannesburg to be a professional actor. In 2011, he starred in the heist action film 31 million Reasons directed by . He later received a SAFTA nomination as the Best Lead Actor in a Feature Film. In 2015, he was being a part of the Trek4Mandela group that summited Kilimanjaro on Mandela Day 2015, which is an effort to raise funds to support Caring4Girls. He has then served as a member of the Executive Committee of South African Guild of Actors (SAGA) since 2010.

In 2018, he appeared in the South African Indian action crime film Mayfair. He played the supportive role of 'Jalaal' in the film, which later received positive reviews. The film was also screened at the 62nd BFI London Film Festival and Africa in Motion Film Festival in October 2018.

== Filmography ==
Year	Film	Role	Genre	Ref.
1996	The Ghost and the Darkness	Nervous Sikh Orderly	Film	
1998	Isidingo	Rajesh Kumar	TV series	
2004	The Eastern Bride	Zahoor Mustafa	Home Video	
2005	City Ses'la	Uncle Prakash	TV series	
2008	On the Couch	Dev	TV series	
2009	Tornado and the Kalahari Horse Whisperer	Doctor	Film	
2010	Florida Road	Doctor	Film	
2011	31 Million Reasons	Ronnie Gopal	Film	
2018	Liberty	Mr. Bhandari	TV mini-series	
2018	Mayfair	Jalaal	Film	
TBD	Alleyway	Doctor Hakeem	Film	
