= Wayne Van Rooyen =

South African actor (born 1978)

- Born: Wayne Van Rooyen; June 14, 1978 (age 48); Johannesburg, South Africa
- Education: University of the Witwatersrand
- Occupations: Actor, voice artist
- Years active: 2016–present
- Height: 1.70 m (5 ft 7 in)

Wayne Van Rooyen (born 14 June 1978), is a South African actor and voice artist. He is best known for the roles in the films Fiela se Kind, Mayfair and Seriously Single.

== Personal life ==
He was born on 14 June 1978 and raised in suburb Eldorado Park, in Johannesburg, South Africa. He graduated with a BA in Dramatic Art with Honours at the University of the Witwatersrand in 2003.

== Career ==
After the graduation, he joined theater and appeared in many stage plays such as Sophiatown and The King of Laughter. He later won the Naledi Theatre Award for Best Supporting Actor for his critically acclaimed role in The King of Laughter. He also joined the world premiere of Athol Fugard's play Victory and the Royal Shakespeare Company's South African collaboration of William Shakespeare's The Tempest with the Baxter Theater.

In 2008, he played the role as 'Brandon "BB" Bonthuys' on the medical drama series Hillside aired on SABC 2. He played the role of 'Vernon "Stokkies" Jacobs' on soapie Scandal! aired on ETV in 2005. His role became highly popular among the public. Then he starred in the variety comedy show Colour TV in 2011 on SABC 2. Meanwhile, he appeared in the drama series Geraamtes in die Kas, in 2013.

In August 2020, he starred in the comedy film Seriously Single co-directed by Katleho Ramaphakela and Rethabile Ramaphakela. It was released on July 31, 2020 on Netflix.

== Filmography ==
| Year | Film | Role | Genre | Ref. |
|---|---|---|---|---|
| 2005 | Scandal! | Vernon "Stokkies" Jacobs | TV series | |
| 2006 | Hillside | Brandon Bonthuys | TV series | |
| 2006 | Cuppen | Receptionist | TV movie | |
| 2007–09 | Wild at Heart | Kirk | TV series | |
| 2010 | Jozi | Waylon | Film | |
| 2012 | Mad Buddies | OB technician | Film | |
| 2013 | Geraamtes in die Kas | Dr. Rudy Abrahams | TV series | |
| 2014 | Rose vir Rosie | Denver Doorsen | Film | |
| 2015 | Sink | Paramedic No. 1 | Film | |
| 2016 | The Empty Man | Recruiter | Film | |
| 2017 | Swartwater | Konstabel Van Zyl | TV series | |
| 2018 | Mayfair | Mahbeer | Film | |
| 2019 | Fiela se Kind | Selling Komoetie | Film | |
| 2020 | Seriously Single | Timothy | Film | |
