= Afrika Eye =

UK film festival

Afrika Eye is a film and arts festival founded in 2005 in Bristol, England. It is described as 'the South West's biggest annual festival of African film, music and arts and is held at venues across Bristol, including Watershed (Bristol), Cube Microplex, Trinity Centre and Bristol Beacon. The festival includes talks, live music, exhibitions and workshops as well as screenings of features, shorts and documentaries by filmmakers from, or with roots in, Africa.'

Afrika Eye 2022 will take place 7 - 19 November, 2022.

== Founders & Organisation ==
Founders, Simon Bright (director of The King and the People) and Ingrid Sinclair (director of Flame (1996)) created Afrika Eye with the aim of promoting 'the richness and diversity of Africa and its diaspora through film, education and cultural exchange'.

Afrika Eye is a non-profit organisation, supported by a number of partners including Watershed (Bristol), Bristol City Council and Arts Council England.

The festival is currently directed by Annie Menter.

== Past festivals ==
See Afrika Eye programmes for information about previous festivals.

Previous artists and guests include:

- Benjamin Zephaniah
- Aloun Ndombet-Assamba (politician)
- Albie Sachs (activist)
- Gary Younge (journalist)
- Justin Adams (musician)
