= Melissa Reddy =

South African journalist and author

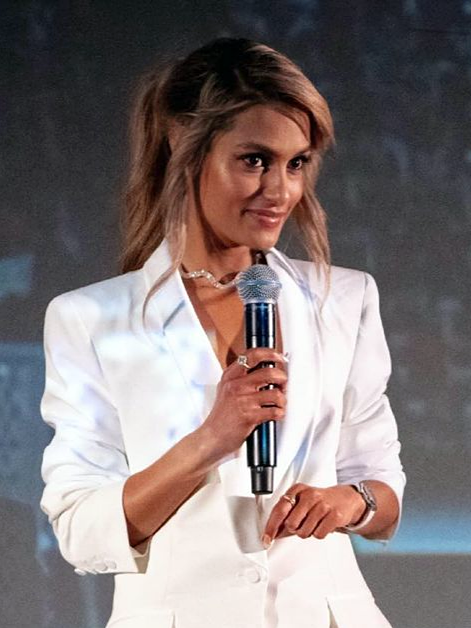
- Melissa Reddy in 2022
- Born: 24 August 1986 (age 40); South Africa
- Occupation: Sports journalist
- Writing career
- Notable work: Believe Us: How Jürgen Klopp Transformed Liverpool Into Title Winners

Melissa Reddy (born 24 August 1986) is a South African football journalist and author. She was a senior reporter for Sky Sports and Sky Sports News, specializing in the Premier League, from 2022 to 2025

== Career ==
Whilst studying at university, Reddy did an internship at Summit TV, a business channel in South Africa. After moving to Cape Town and joining TEAMtalk Media in 2007, and working across many sports, Reddy was Head of Football by 2011, before becoming Deputy Editor of Kick Off which is Africa's largest sport publication. On both occasions, she was the first woman to hold such a post, and was also the first to feature as a football analyst on SuperSport’s marquee shows Backpages and Monday Night Football.

Reddy became the Liverpool correspondent of Goal's 38 editions worldwide in November 2015. Reddy was then football correspondent at ESPN, wrote for The Athletic, and became the senior football correspondent at Joe, before joining The Independent as senior football correspondent in November 2019.

Reddy's television appearances include Sky Sports News' Tackling Racism, Sunday Supplement, Red Men TV and the BBC’s Premier League Show. Reddy has also guested on BBC Radio 5 Live.

Reddy has written for, guested and presented shows on The Anfield Wrap. Reddy has also presented shows on The Football Ramble, and guested on Second Captains, and BT Sport’s Football Writers Podcast. In 2020, Reddy started her own podcast interview series entitled Between The Lines with Melissa Reddy. Guests have included Gary Lineker, Mauricio Pochettino and Daniel Sturridge.

Also in 2020, Reddy released her first book, entitled Believe Us: How Jürgen Klopp Transformed Liverpool Into Title Winners. The book was referenced by England national rugby union team head coach Eddie Jones as an insight into the thinking and practises of the elite team produced by Jürgen Klopp at Liverpool.

Reddy has spoken prominently about the racism and sexism she has endured in forging her career, and the barriers women face.

Reddy was shortlisted in the Best Writer category in the 2021 Football Supporters' Association awards.
