= Sikhism in South Africa =

Total population
- 13,000

Regions with significant populations
- Johannesburg • Durban • Cape Town

Religions
- Sikhism

Languages
- Afrikaans • Zulu • Xhosa • Punjabi • Hindi • Urdu

Sikhism in South Africa is a religious minority. It is estimated that there are 13,000 Sikhs in South Africa. It is a small yet growing community.

== History ==
Sikhs have been in South Africa since the late 19th century. The first Sikh pioneers settled in Durban in KwaZulu Natal on the eastern coast of the country. More Sikhs began settling in South Africa after Apartheid ended. After the system was abolished in 1994, Sikhs began migrating to the country.

In 2006, a gurdwara was established in Johannesburg by a Kenyan Sikh expatriate.

In 2010, a gurdwara was established in Cape Town with support from the Johannesburg congregation.

On 22 November 2015, a gurdwara was unveiled in the Parkmore suburb of Johannesburg.

The majority of South African Sikhs are immigrants from India, Kenya, Botswana, and other countries.

During 2021 South African unrest, South African Sikhs set-up langar distribution kitchen to support their local communities. Many Sikh owned and operated businesses were targeted during the rioting.

There are sizeable populations of Sikhs in Johannesburg, Cape Town, and Durban.

== List of gurdwaras ==
- Gurudwara Sahib Johannesburg (located in Sandton, Johannesburg)
- Gurudwara Sahib Cape Town (located in Cape Town)
- Gurudwara Sahib Durban (located in Chatsworth, Durban)
