= The King and the People =

- Directed by: Simon Bright
- Written by: Ingrid Sinclair
- Produced by: Simon Bright
- Starring: Mswati III; Princess Sikhanyiso; Queen LaMbikiza
- Release date: 2013
- Running time: 53 minutes
- Languages: English siSwati

The King and the People is a 2013 documentary film by Simon Bright, a Zimbabwean filmmaker. It follows problems of Swaziland, a landlocked country in southern Africa.

The film features Mswati III, the king of Swaziland, and his heiress and self claimed rapper Princess Sikhanyiso.
