= Wilhelm van der Walt =

South African actor (born 1984)

- Born: Wilhelm van der Walt; 18 August 1984 (age 42); Bloemfontein, South Africa
- Education: University of the Free State; University of Stellenbosch
- Occupation: Actor
- Years active: 2007–present
- Height: 176 cm (5 ft 9 in)
- Children: Emil van der Walt

Wilhelm van der Walt (born 18 August 1984) is a South African actor particularly dominating South African theatre. He is best known for the roles in the films Stuur groete aan Mannetjies Roux, Il console italiano, Projek Dina and villain role "Ty Prinsloo" in the soapie 7de Laan.

== Personal life ==
Van der Walt was born on 18 August 1984 in Bloemfontein, Free State, South Africa. He obtained his Bachelor of Arts (Hons.) degree in drama from the University of the Free State in 2007. Then in 2009, he completed his master's degree in acting from the University of Stellenbosch.

== Career ==
In 2012, he made his television debut with the SABC 2 soap opera 7de Laan where he played the role "Ty Prinsloo". He continued to play the role for four consecutive years, until 2016. He made several contribution in theatre productions such as Innibos, Be(t)roudag. He acted in numerous short films, some of which received critics acclaim, including: March the Second, Nantes, Bloedson, Soos Gister, and Onder die Tafel. In 2013, he made the lead role in the crime series Die Boland Moorde. However, he returned to the series again for another guest character in the episode 5 of second season aired on 14 March 2017. In 2007, he appeared in the Color of Freedom. He also joined with theatre companies such as Vleis, Rys & Aartappels. Apart from that, he also acted in the television serials, such as: Madam and Eve, Yizo, SOS, and the BBC series Cave Girl.

Then in 2017 he made a recurring role as "Jan" in the legal drama series Fynskrif and continued for two years until 2019. In 2019, he appeared in the supernatural soap opera Die Spreeus. In the same year, he joined an art exhibition as a presenter. Later in the year, he won the Fiëstas for Best Actor award as well. In 2020, he played Christo De Lange's role in the second season of the soapie Die Byl. In the same year, he acted in the comic series Ekstra Medium with the role "Bertie Heyns".

== Filmography ==
Year	Film	Role	Genre	Ref.
2007	March the Second	Shark	Short film	
2011	Il console italiano	Young Policeman	Film	
2012	7de Laan	Ty Prinsloo	TV series	
2012	Nantes	Johan	Short film	
2013	Bloedson	Dirk	Short film	
2013	Stuur groete aan Mannetjies Roux	Anton	Film	
2014	Onder die Tafel	Emile	Short film	
2017	Soos Gister	Gavin	Short film	
2019	Die Spreeus	Hugo	TV series	
2020	Projek Dina	Damien Brand	TV series	
2020	Ekstra Medium	Bertie	TV series	

== Awards ==
- kykNET Fiesta Award: Best Actor, for Stones That Fall (2019)
- Aardklop nomination: Best Actor, for Stones That Fall (2018)
- Woordfees Trophy nomination: Best Actor, for Stones That Fall (2018)
- KykNET Fiesta nomination: Best Supporting role for Better (2018)
- Kanna Nomination: Best Supporting Role, for Shell (2017)
- Naledi Theatre Awards nomination: Breakthrough Performance, for Shell (2017)
- Naledi Nomination: Best Supporting Role, for Shell (2017)
- SAT Magazine nomination: Best Actor in ŉ Play, for Shell (2017)
- Tempo nomination: Soap opera Actor of the Year, for 7de Laan (2016)
- Kanna Nomination: Best Male Lead, for Sun.Moon.Stars (2016)
- kykNET Fiesta nomination: Best Male Lead, for Sun.Moon.Stars (2016)
- Aardklop Award: Best Actor at Aardklop Arts Festival, for Sun.Moon.Stars (2015)
- Tempo nomination: Soap opera Actor of the Year, for 7de Laan (2015)
- Woordfees Trophy nomination: Best Supporting Role, for Son.Maan.Sterre (2015)
- Royalty Soap Nomination: Outstanding Male Villain, for 7de Laan (2015)
- Fleur du Cap nomination: Best Supporting Role, for Rooiland (2014)
- kykNET Fiesta nomination: Best Emerging Artist, for Rooiland (2012)
- Fleur du Cap nomination: Most Promising Student (2010)
