= Encounters Film Festival =

International film festival in Bristol, England

- Location: Bristol, England
- Founded: 1995; 31 years ago
- Language: England
- Website: www.encounters.film

Encounters Film Festival is an international film festival held annually in Bristol, England. Founded in 1995, it is the UK's longest-running short film competition. The festival takes place each September on Bristol's harbourside, with its main venues at Watershed, Bristol Beacon and Arnolfini. Bristol is a UNESCO City of Film.

Encounters is a qualifying festival for the BAFTA for Best British Short Film and Best British Short Animation, the British Independent Film Awards, and the European Film Awards.

== History ==
The festival began in 1995 as Brief Encounters, a one-off event. Animated Encounters was set up in 2001 to celebrate and showcase animation. In 2006 the two festivals united as the Encounters Short Film Festival.

In 2010 Encounters became a qualifying festival for the Academy Awards for short film categories.

In 2011 Encounters announced a new partnership with the European Film Academy Short Film Initiative, becoming one of fifteen European festivals that present nominations for the European Film Awards.

The festival celebrated its 30th edition in September 2025.

== Programme ==
The festival's centrepiece is its international short film competition, which screens over 200 films drawn from more than 50 countries across competitive and curated programmes spanning fiction, documentary, animation, and experimental work. The festival does not require premiere status for submissions.

The 2025 programme featured 44 premieres, including 33 UK premieres, with world and international premieres from China, Kazakhstan, Poland, Norway, and the USA.

Encounters also runs DepicT!, a micro-shorts competition open to films of 90 seconds or under, which has run since 1998.

The festival's industry programme includes talks, masterclasses, and panel discussions with leading figures from the screen industries. The 30th edition in 2025 welcomed 2,000 guests and 650 industry delegates across more than 80 screenings and events.

== Awards ==
The festival presents awards across several categories. The principal awards are the Brief Encounters Grand Prix for live action short film, the Animated Encounters Grand Prix for animated short film, and the Documentary Encounters Grand Prix for documentary short film. Additional awards include Best of British (Live Action), Best of British (Animation), the Audience Award, and the DepicT! Award.

=== 2025 award winners ===
- Brief Encounters Grand Prix – The Last People, directed by Nicolás Pindeus
- Animated Encounters Grand Prix – Two Black Boys in Paradise, directed by Baz Sells
- Documentary Encounters Grand Prix – Incident, directed by Bill Morrison
- Best of British (Live Action) – There Will Come Soft Rains, directed by Elham Ehsas
- Best of British (Animation) – Dédé (Ancestor), directed by Yasmine Djedje-Fisher-Azoume
- Audience Award – Hunting, directed by Lea Favre
- DepicT! Award – Full of Sh*t, directed by Clarissa Kumala

=== 2026 award winners ===
- Brief Encounters Grand Prix — Hyena, directed by Altay Ulan Yang
- Animated Encounters Grand Prix — HAG, directed by Anna Ginsburg
- Documentary Encounters Grand Prix — Uncle Filmi, directed by Nazgol Kashani
- Best of British (Live Action) — Paper Plane, directed by Saoirse Ronan
- Audience Award — The Devil Is in Me, directed by Tia Salisbury

== Special guests ==
Past headline guests at the festival have included screenwriter and director Charlie Kaufman and director Michel Gondry, who appeared together at the 30th edition in 2025, Hayao Miyazaki, Ray Harryhausen, Andrea Arnold, and Matt Groening.

== Partners and supporters ==
Encounters works in partnership with leading organisations across the UK screen industries, including BBC Writers Room, Aardman, The Bottle Yard Studios, the BFI, the British Council, the National Film and Television School, Watershed, Bristol Beacon, and Arnolfini. The festival is supported by the BFI Film Audience Network, the University of Bristol, and UWE Bristol.
