= Gopala Davies =

South African actor and director

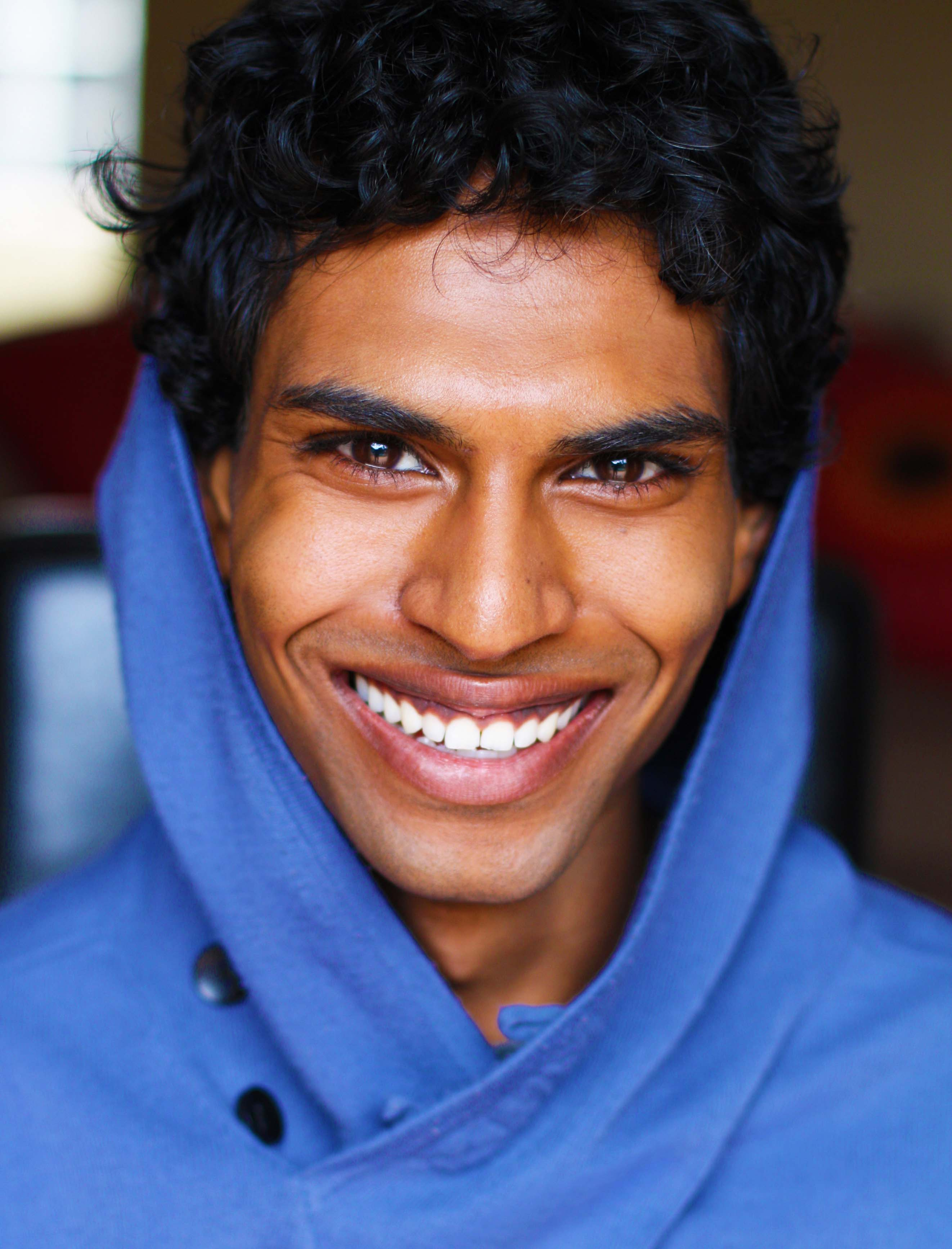
- Born: 14 May 1988 (age 38); Pretoria, Gauteng, South Africa
- Occupations: Actor and Director
- Years active: 2008–present
- Website: http://gopaladavies.com

Gopala Davies (born 14 May 1988) is an actor and director. He is best known for his intermedial theatre production Barbe Bleue: A story about madness, which won a Standard Bank Ovation Award at The National Arts Festival in 2015, and the Best Student Director Award in 2014.

Gopala plays the character Adam in the short Film Lilith: Genesis One which won the Film category at the 2015 PPC Imaginarium Awards. and the 2016 'Best International Experimental' at the ICARO Festival Internacional de Cine. He plays the role of Robert in the SABC 1 soap opera Generations: The Legacy. Gopala also toured South Africa with Pieter Toerien’s The History Boys, which won a Naledi award for The Best Production of a Play in 2011.

In 2013 Gopala played the role of Mohammed in Tom Coash’s Cry Havoc, produced by Grace Meadows and Ashraf Johaardien, in which he performed alongside actors David Dennis and Brenda Radloff.

In 2016 Gopala was commissioned by the French Institute of South Africa (Institut Français) to direct Les Cenci: A story about Artaud for the National Arts Festival’s Main Programme. He also played the role of Alphonse Lebel in Jade Bowers’ Scorched, written by Wajdi Mouawad.
