= Jailoshini Naidoo =

South African television presenter

- Born: April 13, 1967 (age 59); Chatsworth, Durban, South Africa
- Notable work: Kandasamys film series

Jailoshini Naidoo is a South African television presenter, actress and stand-up comedian. She is best known for her role as Jennifer Kandasamy in the Kandasamys film series.

== Early life ==
Jailoshini Naidoo grew up in Chatsworth. She went to University of Durban-Westville and got a bachelor’s degree in pediatrics while also studying drama, English and education. She also went to University of South Africa where she studied Public Relations. After college, she worked as a drama and English teacher.

== Theatre ==
- Jungle Book (2007) as Raksha
- 1949 (2008; sole character in the play)
- At the Edge (2010; 30+ characters)
- The God of Carnage (2011)
- Twitch (2013)
- At the Edge (2014; 20+ characters)
- Aunty Rama and Friends (2014)
- Curry on Laughing (2016)

== Filmography ==
Year	Film	Role	Notes	Ref.
2017	Keeping Up with the Kandasamys	Jennifer Kandasamy	Nominated, Simon Sabela Award for Best Actress	
2019	3 Days to Go	Melissa		
2019	Kandasamys: The Wedding	Jennifer Kandasamy		
2020	Mr. Johnson	Dr. Priya Moonsamy		
2021	Trippin' with the Kandasamys	Jennifer Kandasamy		
2023	Kandasamys: The Baby	Jennifer Kandasamy	Also co-writer	

=== Television ===
Year	Film	Role	Channel	Notes	Ref.
2005-2015	Eastern Mosaic	Presenter	SABC 2		
2010-2011	Strike Back	Indian journalist	Sky One, Cinemax	3 episodes	
2014-2020	Mela	Presenter	SABC 2		
2018-2023	Imbewu: The Seed	Nirupa	e.tv	Main role (seasons 1-5)	
2026	How To Ruin Diwali: Meet The Parents	Tarina	Netflix		
