= Mishqah Parthiephal =

South African actress of Indian descent

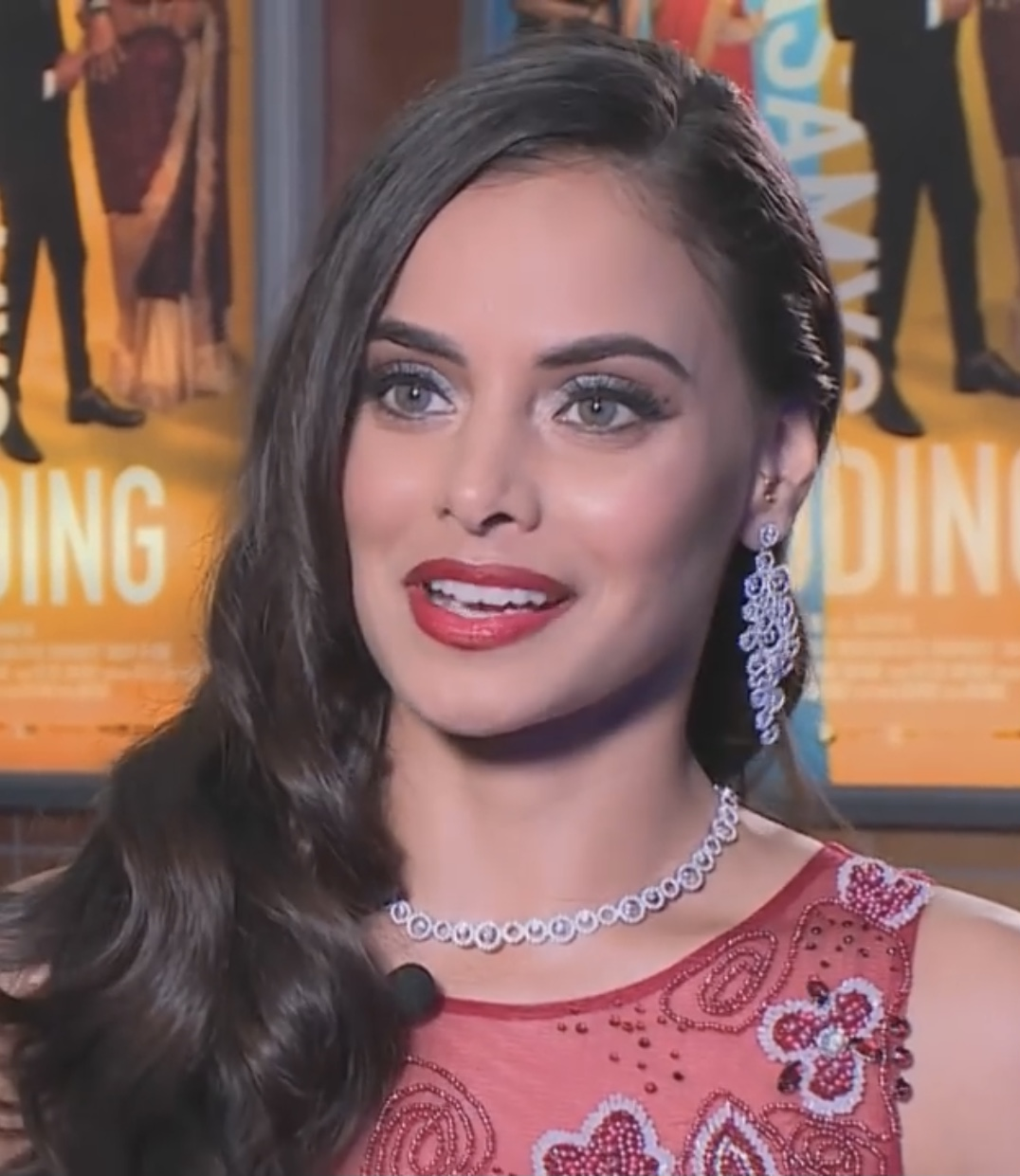
- Parthiephal in 2019
- Born: 21 September 1989 (age 36); Verulam, KwaZulu-Natal, South Africa
- Education: University of KwaZulu-Natal
- Occupations: Actress, model and filmmaker
- Years active: 2010–present
- Spouse: Tarlan Baker (m. 2021)
- Children: 1

Mishqah Parthiephal (born 21 September 1989) is a South African actress, model and filmmaker. After her first film role in White Gold (2010), she primarily worked in television and advertising until 2015. She starred in the CTV and Netflix series The Indian Detective (2017) as well as the Kandasamys film series (2017–2023).

== Early life ==
Born and raised in Verulam, just north of Durban, Parthiepal is Hindu of Indian descent. She attended Durban Girls' High School. She studied drama and media at the University of KwaZulu-Natal before moving to Johannesburg.

== Personal life ==
Parthiephal gave birth to a son, Jude, in 2022. She currently resides in the USA.

== Filmography ==
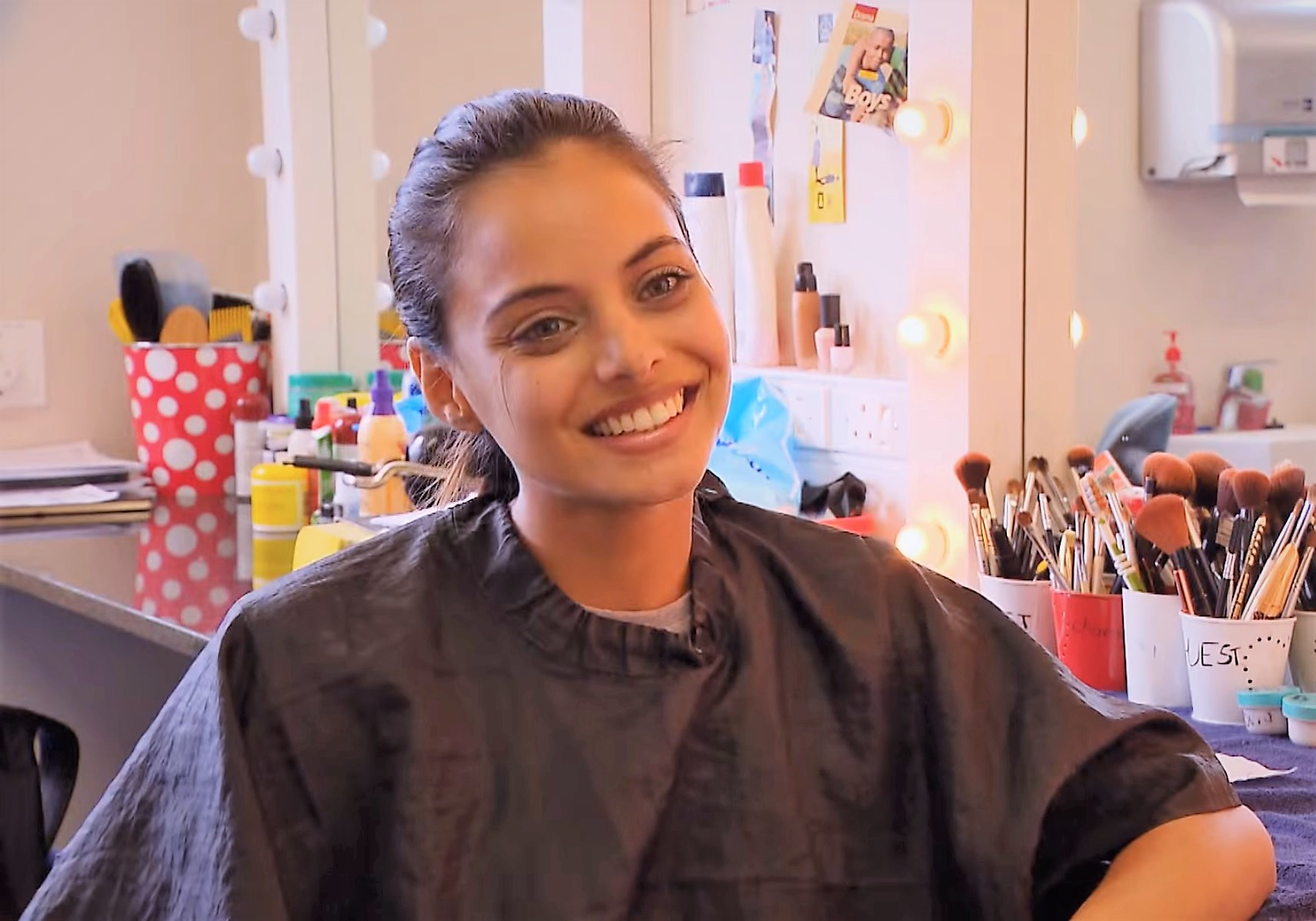
Parthiephal in 2016

=== Film ===
Year	Title	Role	Notes
2010	White Gold	Noor Jehan	
2015	Himmat	Esha Maharaj	Short film
2015	The Dance		
2016	Foreigner	Nirvana	Short film
2016	Paraya		
2017	Keeping Up with the Kandasamys	Jodi Kandasamy	
2019	Kandasamys: The Wedding	Jodi Kandasamy	
2020	Fruitful Emission	—N/a	Director, writer
2021	Trippin' with the Kandasamys	Jodi Kandasamy Naidoo	
2023	Kandasamys: The Baby	Jodi Naidoo	

=== Television ===
Year	Title	Role	Notes
2014–2015	Snake Park	Chris Laurenson	
2017	The Indian Detective	Priya Sehgal	Lead role
2020	Vagrant Queen	Hannah	Episode: "Temple of Doom"
