= Africa in Motion =

Film festival held in Edinburgh, Scotland

- Location: Edinburgh, Scotland
- Founded: 2006
- Awards received: S.E.R Foundation
- Website: africainmotion.co.uk

Africa in Motion (AiM) is an annual African film festival which took place in Scotland in late October/early November. The primary aim of the festival was to offer audiences in Scotland the opportunity to view the best of African cinema from across the continent. The festival ran from 2006-2022 in Scotland, Edinburgh and Glasgow primarily. The festival was founded in 2006 by Lizelle Bisschoff, a South African researcher based in the UK.

== Programme ==
AiM’s programme includes both contemporary and classic African cinema. Numerous film categories are covered, including features, shorts, documentaries, animation, Nollywood, horror and experimental work. Many of the films screened at AiM have never before been shown in Scotland, and the festival thus provides opportunities for the Scottish audience to view African films. AiM 2008 toured a number of cities across the UK, including Bristol, Cambridge, Cardiff, Derby, Dundee, Glasgow, Inverness, Manchester, Newcastle, Sheffield and Stirling. Since 2009, the festival has also toured to rural venues in the Scottish Highlands and Islands in November following the main festival.

AiM hosts a short-film competition showcasing the work of young and emerging African filmmakers, with the winner receiving a cash prize. Film screenings are accompanied by a range of events, including panel discussions, symposiums, workshops, African music performances, exhibitions, storytelling sessions and others.

Directors invited to the festival have included Jean-Marie Teno from Cameroon, Gaston Kaboré from Burkina Faso, and South African Richard Stanley.

In 2013, for the first time, the UK’s biggest four African film festivals – Africa in Motion (AiM) in Edinburgh/Glasgow, Afrika Eye in Bristol, the Cambridge African Film Festival and Film Africa, London – united to share films and filmmakers in a drive to bring a greater variety of contemporary African cinema to a broader UK audience. The festivals joined forces to tour a quartet of highly rated new feature films from Africa.
