= 42nd Tony Awards =

1988 US theatrical awards ceremony

- Date: June 5, 1988
- Location: Minskoff Theatre, New York City, New York
- Hosted by: Angela Lansbury
- Most wins: The Phantom of the Opera (7)
- Most nominations: Anything Goes, Into the Woods, and The Phantom of the Opera (10)

Television/radio coverage
- Network: CBS

The 42nd Tony Awards ceremony was held on June 5, 1988, at the Minskoff Theatre and broadcast live on CBS, hosted by Angela Lansbury.

== Eligibility ==
Shows that opened on Broadway during the 1987–1988 season before May 4, 1988 were eligible.

Original plays

- Breaking the Code
- Burn This
- Joe Turner's Come and Gone
- La Serva Amorosa
- M. Butterfly
- Serious Money
- Sherlock's Last Case
- Speed-the-Plow
- A Walk in the Woods

Original musicals

- Chess
- Don't Get God Started
- The Gospel at Colonus
- Into the Woods
- Late Nite Comic
- Mail
- Oba Oba
- The Phantom of the Opera
- Romance/Romance
- Roza
- Sarafina!
- Teddy & Alice

Play revivals

- Broadway
- The Comedy of Errors
- Macbeth
- A Streetcar Named Desire

Musical revivals

- Anything Goes
- Cabaret
- Dreamgirls

== The ceremony ==
Musicals represented were:

- A Chorus Line, "Music and the Mirror" – Donna McKechnie
- Anything Goes, "Anything Goes" – Patti LuPone and Company
- Dreamgirls, "One Night Only"/"Dreamgirls" – Sheryl Lee Ralph, Loretta Devine and Terry Burrell;
- Into the Woods, "Into the Woods"/"Children Will Listen" – Phylicia Rashad and Company;
- The Phantom of the Opera, Last verse of "The Phantom of the Opera" and "The Music of The Night" – Sarah Brightman and Michael Crawford;
- Romance/Romance, "I'll Always Remember the Song"/"It's Not Too Late" – Scott Bakula, Alison Fraser and Company
- Sarafina!, "Sarafina!" – Company

Plays represented were:M. Butterfly, Scene with John Lithgow and BD Wong; Joe Turner's Come and Gone, Scene with Mel Winkler, Ed Hall and Delroy Lindo; A Walk in the Woods, Scene with Sam Waterston and Robert Prosky; and Speed-the-Plow, Scene with Joe Mantegna and Ron Silver.

A tribute to the late Michael Bennett was performed by Donna McKechnie of the original Chorus Line and the three original Dreamgirls, Terry Burrell, Loretta Devine and Sheryl Lee Ralph.

== Winners and nominees ==
Winners are in bold

Best Play	Best Musical
**M. Butterfly – David Henry Hwang**; A Walk in the Woods – Lee Blessing; Joe Turner's Come and Gone – August Wilson; Speed-the-Plow – David Mamet	**The Phantom of the Opera**; Into the Woods; Romance/Romance; Sarafina!
Best Revival	Best Book of a Musical
**Anything Goes**; A Streetcar Named Desire; Cabaret; Dreamgirls	**James Lapine – Into the Woods**; Lee Breuer – The Gospel at Colonus; Richard Stilgoe and Andrew Lloyd Webber – The Phantom of the Opera; Barry Harman – Romance/Romance
Best Performance by a Leading Actor in a Play	Best Performance by a Leading Actress in a Play
**Ron Silver – Speed-the-Plow as Charlie Fox**; Derek Jacobi – Breaking the Code as Alan Turing; John Lithgow – M. Butterfly as Rene Gallimard; Robert Prosky – A Walk in the Woods as Andrey Botvinnik	**Joan Allen – Burn This as Anna Mann**; Blythe Danner – A Streetcar Named Desire as Blanche Du Bois; Glenda Jackson – Macbeth as Lady Macbeth; Frances McDormand – A Streetcar Named Desire as Stella Kowalski
Best Performance by a Leading Actor in a Musical	Best Performance by a Leading Actress in a Musical
**Michael Crawford – The Phantom of the Opera as The Phantom of the Opera**; Scott Bakula – Romance/Romance as Alfred Von Wilmers/Sam; David Carroll – Chess as Anatoly; Howard McGillin – Anything Goes as Billy Crocker	**Joanna Gleason – Into the Woods as The Baker's Wife**; Alison Fraser – Romance/Romance as Josefine Weninger/Monica; Judy Kuhn – Chess as Florence; Patti LuPone – Anything Goes as Reno Sweeney
Best Performance by a Featured Actor in a Play	Best Performance by a Featured Actress in a Play
**BD Wong – M. Butterfly as Song Liling**; Michael Gough – Breaking the Code as Dillwyn Knox; Lou Liberatore – Burn This as Larry; Delroy Lindo – Joe Turner's Come and Gone as Herald Loomis	**L. Scott Caldwell – Joe Turner's Come and Gone as Bertha Holly**; Kimberleigh Aarn – Joe Turner's Come and Gone as Mattie Campbell; Kate Nelligan – Serious Money as Various Characters; Kimberly Scott – Joe Turner's Come and Gone as Molly Cunningham
Best Performance by a Featured Actor in a Musical	Best Performance by a Featured Actress in a Musical
**Bill McCutcheon – Anything Goes as Moonface Martin**; Anthony Heald – Anything Goes as Lord Evelyn Oakleigh; Werner Klemperer – Cabaret as Herr Schultz; Robert Westenberg – Into the Woods as The Wolf / Cinderella's Prince	**Judy Kaye – The Phantom of the Opera as Carlotta Guidicelli**; Leleti Khumalo – Sarafina! as Sarafina; Alyson Reed – Cabaret as Sally Bowles; Regina Resnik – Cabaret as Fraulein Schneider
Best Original Score (Music and/or Lyrics) Written for the Theatre	Best Choreography
**Into the Woods – Stephen Sondheim (music and lyrics)**; The Phantom of the Opera – Andrew Lloyd Webber (music) and Charles Hart and Richard Stilgoe (lyrics); Romance/Romance – Keith Herrmann (music) and Barry Harman (lyrics); Sarafina! – Mbongeni Ngema and Hugh Masekela (music and lyrics)	**Michael Smuin – Anything Goes**; Lar Lubovitch – Into the Woods; Gillian Lynne – The Phantom of the Opera; Ndaba Mhlongo and Mbongeni Ngema – Sarafina!
Best Direction of a Play	Best Direction of a Musical
**John Dexter – M. Butterfly**; Gregory Mosher – Speed-the-Plow; Lloyd Richards – Joe Turner's Come and Gone; Clifford Williams – Breaking the Code	**Harold Prince – The Phantom of the Opera**; James Lapine – Into the Woods; Mbongeni Ngema – Sarafina!; Jerry Zaks – Anything Goes
Best Scenic Design	Best Costume Design
**Maria Björnson – The Phantom of the Opera**; Eiko Ishioka – M. Butterfly; Tony Straiges – Into the Woods; Tony Walton – Anything Goes	**Maria Björnson – The Phantom of the Opera**; Ann Hould-Ward – Into the Woods; Eiko Ishioka – M. Butterfly; Tony Walton – Anything Goes
Best Lighting Design
**Andrew Bridge – The Phantom of the Opera**; Paul Gallo – Anything Goes; Richard Nelson – Into the Woods; Andy Phillips – M. Butterfly

== Special awards ==
Regional Theatre Tony Award

- South Coast Repertory, Costa Mesa, CA

Special Awards

- Brooklyn Academy of Music

=== Multiple nominations and awards ===
These productions had multiple nominations:

- 10 nominations: Anything Goes, Into the Woods and The Phantom of the Opera
- 7 nominations: M. Butterfly
- 6 nominations: Joe Turner's Come and Gone
- 5 nominations: Romance/Romance and Sarafina!
- 4 nominations: Cabaret
- 3 nominations: Breaking the Code, Speed-the-Plow and A Streetcar Named Desire
- 2 nominations: Burn This, Chess and A Walk in the Woods

The following productions received multiple awards.

- 7 wins: The Phantom of the Opera
- 3 wins: Anything Goes, Into the Woods and M. Butterfly

== See also ==
- Drama Desk Awards
- 1988 Laurence Olivier Awards – equivalent awards for West End theatre productions
- Obie Award
- New York Drama Critics' Circle
- Theatre World Award
- Lucille Lortel Awards
