= Voices of Sarafina! =

1988 film

- Film poster
- Directed by: Nigel Noble
- Written by: Mbongeni Ngema
- Produced by: Bernard Gersten; Diane Kolyer; Nigel Noble
- Starring: Leleti Khumalo
- Cinematography: John Hazard
- Edited by: Emma Joan Morris
- Production company: Noble Enterprises for Lincoln Center Theatre
- Distributed by: New Yorker Films
- Release date: September 19, 1988
- Running time: 85 minutes
- Country: United States
- Language: English

Voices of Sarafina! is a 1988 American documentary film about the anti-apartheid musical stage play Sarafina! directed by Nigel Noble. It was screened in the Un Certain Regard section at the 1989 Cannes Film Festival.

== Cast ==
- Leleti Khumalo as Sarafina
- Baby Cele as Mistress Itsapity
- Pat Mlaba as Colgate
- Miriam Makeba as Herself
- Mary Twala as Sarafina's Grandmother
- Mbongeni Ngema as Sabela

== Release ==
The film had its premiere at the Museum of Modern Art in New York City on September 19, 1988.
