= Duma Ndlovu =

South African poet, filmmaker, journalist and playwright

- Born: Duma Reggie Ndlovu; 12 October 1954 (age 71); Taung, North West, South Africa
- Education: Sekano Ntoane High School
- Alma mater: Hunter College
- Occupations: Producer; director; screenwriter; poet; playwright; journalist
- Years active: 1992–present
- Notable work: Bergville stories; The Game; Umkhokha: The Curse; Muvhango; Uzalo

Duma Ndlovu (born 12 October 1954) is a South African poet, filmmaker, producer, journalist and playwright. He is well known in the South African television industry, having created award-winning shows such as Muvhango, Imbewu: The Seed and Uzalo. Between 1996 and 2004 he was the chairman of the South African Music Awards.

== Early life ==
Duma Ndlovu is of Zulu ancestry, and he was born in Taung, North West; his ancestral home, however, is in Bergville, KwaZulu-Natal. He went to Sekano Ntoane High School in Senaoane.

After finishing high school he started writing for The World newspaper. He then founded the Medupe Writers Association, a group that encouraged young black people to take interest in being writers. He served as the organization's president until 1977 when the apartheid government banned the group due to its participation in black consciousness and anti-apartheid movements.

After Ndlovu and many members of the Medupe Writers Association were banned by the apartheid government, he left South Africa for the United States to avoid being persecuted by the apartheid government. In the United States he was able to study and complete his master's degree at Hunter College in New York.

In 1985, Ndlovu founded the Woza Afrika Foundation in order to give young black aspiring actors and actresses the opportunity to pursue their dreams and also raise funds to support the overall Arts in South Africa. He also taught African-American literature and music at the State University of New York at Stony Brook.

In May 2022, University of Zululand awarded him with PhD by the faculty of Humanities and Social Sciences.

== Career ==
In 1992 Duma Ndlovu returned to South Africa, and he founded the Word Of Mouth Productions to mount music, theatre and television productions. The company was successful and a few years later it was chosen as the official casting company in South Africa for the Broadway musical Disney's The Lion King.

== Bergville Stories ==
In 1994, he wrote Bergville Stories, which was positively received and had successful runs in Durban at the Playhouse, the Market Theatre and the Grahamstown National Arts Festival.

His other theatrical writing and directing credits include:

- Bergville Stories
- The Game
- The Ritual
- The Journey
- MEMEZA (upcoming)
- Sheila's Day

== Muvhango ==
Ndlovu created Murendeni, the first Tshivenda TV drama based in Thathe, Limpopo. At first the show was primarily in TshiVenda but later on other languages were incorporated into the show in order to bridge the cultural divide between the various tribes in South Africa. The show's premiere episode aired on 7 April 1997 on Sabc 2 and it was well received by the viewers. The show was a success and it won multiple awards. Ndlovu was awarded an honorary PhD from the University of Venda for his work in Muvhango. Muvhango is the most watched show on Sabc 2, and on 16 May 2019 it was reported that the show had reached 6 million viewers.

When Duma Ndlovu was asked, "With your first language being Zulu - why isn't it a Zulu drama?" he replied:

The organisation that is today known as ICASA, it was called IBA then; they called on the SABC to start featuring marginalised languages. I saw a gap, Zulu is not a marginalised language; in fact, Zulu is the majority language in South Africa so I then decided to write in the smallest South African language, Tshivenda, because I was familiar with it. I'd learnt it as a child and I was familiar with the cultures. I thought it would make an impact, and it did so the reading of the situation was quite correct.

— Duma Ndlovu

== Imbewu: The Seed ==
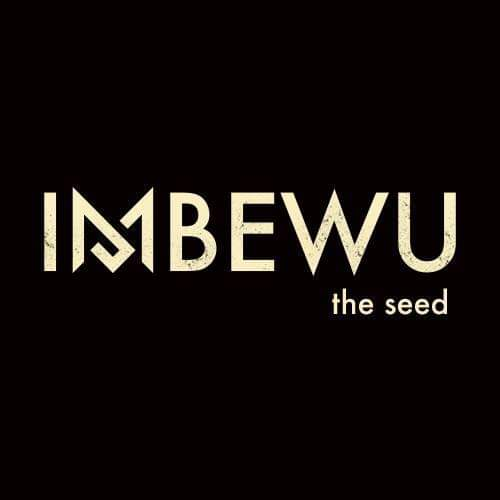
Imbewu: The Seed logo

Duma Ndlovu created Imbewu: The Seed with Leleti Khumalo and Anant Singh as executive producers. The show was broadcast on etv and garnered positive reviews from the viewers. It attracted 2.7 million viewers on its premier and as of December 2018 it had over 4 million viewers.

== Uzalo ==
Duma Ndlovu created the show Uzalo, a telenovela shot and based in KwaMashu's F section in KwaZulu-Natal. On 9 February 2015 the show's premiere episode aired on Sabc 1 and was an instant hit with the viewers, gaining 5.5 million viewers in less than a month despite only broadcasting three nights a week. Uzalo temporarily switched to SABC 2 due to schedule changes on SABC 1; it surpassed Muvhango as the most watched show on the channel, but the latter regained its top spot after Uzalo was moved back to Sabc 1.

The show's popularity continued to grow immensely as it was extended from three nights a week to five nights a week and was now competing with Generations: The Legacy for the most watched TV show in South Africa. In June 2015 Uzalo officially dethroned Generations: The Legacy as the most watched television show in South Africa.

At the end of September 2018, Uzalo had broken all records in the history of television viewing in South Africa. On the first of October 2018 the show had reached 10.2 million viewers, cementing its top spot as the most watched television programme by far.

== Accolades ==
- Duma Ndlovu received an honorary PhD from the University of Venda.
- Duma Ndlovu and Mbongeni Ngema were honoured by United States Congressman Charles Rangel for their contribution to the Arts. Charles Rangel declared 9 May as "Duma Ndlovu and Mbongeni Ngema Day" in Harlem, New York.

== Controversies ==
In 2024, Ndlovu was arrested after being accused of defrauding the South African Revenue Service of R25-million. He was released on bail of R100 000 and instructed not to communicate with any witnesses.
