= Somizi Mhlongo =

South African television personality (born 1972)

- Born: Somizi Buyani Mhlongo; 23 December 1972 (age 53); Soweto, Gauteng, South Africa
- Other name: Somgaga
- Occupations: Choreographer; actor; singer; media personality; television presenter; businessman; socialite
- Years active: 1978–present
- Known for: Idols South Africa (judge), Sarafina
- Political party: African National Congress
- Partner: Mohale Motaung (m. 2019–2021)
- Children: 1
- Parent(s): Ndaba Mhlongo (father); Mary Twala (mother)

Somizi Buyani Mhlongo (born 23 December 1972) known monomously as Somizi is a South African media personality, actor and socialite. In 1992, he appeared on the musical and political film, Sarafina! which gained him prominence. Mhlongo became lead choreographer for numerous shows and events, including the opening and closing ceremonies for the 2010 FIFA World Cup and 2013 Africa Cup of Nations.

After starring and taking part in the choreography of Sarafina!, Mhlongo also appeared in several films including drama film Cry, the Beloved Country (1995) as well as various television shows, including Idols South Africa and V Entertainment.

== Early life ==
Somizi Buyani Mhlongo was born on 23 December 1972, in Soweto, the largest township in Johannesburg, to South African actress Mary Twala and actor and comedian Ndaba Mhlongo. Through the influence of his parents, he became exposed to the entertainment industry at a young age. He had one sibling, a brother named Archie, who was fatally stabbed in 1985.

== Career ==
=== Film and television ===
Mhlongo's acting career began when he was 13, appearing on the film Scavengers in 1987. In 1992, he then joined the musical and political film, Sarafina! in which he played a character by the name of Fire, but nicknamed "Whacko". He also appeared in films including Kein Himmel über Afrika (1993) and Cry, the Beloved Country (1995).

Mhlongo was featured on the television series Tarzan: The Epic Adventures in 1996. His biggest judging duty was when he was appointed as the new judge for the eleventh season of Idols South Africa. He was also a lead judge on the former SABC 1 competition show Dance Your Butt Off alongside actress and dancer Khabonina Qubeka. In 2016, Mhlongo premiered his reality show Living the Dream with Somizi which aired on Mzansi Magic. Other TV credits include City Ses'la, Ayeye and 10 Over 10.

Mhlongo hosted various award shows notably being the South African Music Awards where he co-hosted for 3 consecutive years (2016, 2017 and 2018). On 26 April 2018, Mhlongo was the featured roastee in Comedy Central's annual roast special.

He co-hosted KZN Entertainment Awards on 15 December 2020 with Pearl Thusi.

=== Choreography ===
Mhlongo's debut choreography work was on the musical film Sarafina! He choreographed many prominent events including the opening and closing ceremonies for the huge international football association FIFA for the 2010 hosting in his home country South Africa. Mhlongo choreographed various award shows and events including Miss South Africa, Metro FM Music Awards, South African Music Awards and the Channel O Music Video Awards. He also danced, and was a choreographer for the gospel choir Joyous Celebration.

In 2017, Mhlongo released the dance workout DVD Grind! With Somizi, which was available at Verimark. The workout choreography had many elements of South African dance moves. Mhlongo also did several YouTube workout videos under the name Kwaitone Dance Fitness with Somizi.

=== Radio ===
Starting on 3 April 2017, Mhlongo was one of the co-hosts of Metro FM breakfast show The Fresh Breakfast Show alongside the lead host DJ Fresh and soccer presenter Mpho Letsholonyane. On 30 March 2019, it was announced that he would be replaced by Relebogile Mabotja as the station reshuffled. Mhlongo was then moved to co-host #TheBridge – the show after the set and airing of The Fresh Breakfast Show timeslot.

=== Other ventures ===
==== Endorsements ====
In 2017, Mhlongo was named the ambassador for the satellite service DStv as for his notability on Idols South Africa which airs on two of their channels – M-Net and Mzansi Magic. He then endorsed with the Department of Water and Sanitation later that year. He also endorsed McDonald's South Africa in being the face of McCafé Coach Sessions.

==== Writing ====
On 29 June 2017, Mhlongo released his autobiographical book named Dominoes, Unbreakable Spirit. He co-wrote the book along with journalist and author Lesley Mofokeng. The book shares his life in showbiz, childhood, entertainment business, parents' roles, sexuality and friendship.

==== Music ====
Mhlongo incorporated in Kwaito and gospel for his song releases in the 2000s, which critically and commercially failed.

In 2017, he released his house-focused and gqom-influenced revival song "Ngibonile" featuring DJ and record producer Heavy K.

In 2021, Mhlongo recorded as a featured artist in Vusi Nova's song "Ntandane", from his Gospel-influenced album, Ngumama.

== Controversies ==
=== Sexual assault ===
In November 2007, Mhlongo was arrested following a complaint by Celani Njapha, who claimed that Mhlongo groped and sexually harassed him at his home under the guise of an autograph. Mhlongo was found guilty and was sentenced to 4 months in prison or R6000 fine. Half the sentence was suspended for three years.

=== Plagiarism claim over Dinner at Somizi's ===
In September 2020, producer Hastings Moeng legally and publicly accused Mhlongo of stealing his intellectual property after he claimed that Mhlongo's celebrity show Dinner at Somizi's was a stolen concept he originally pitched in 2014. Moeng provided evidence, including emails and details of past meetings with Mhlongo and producer Legeng Manqele, who is the producer of Dinner at Somizi's.

=== Domestic abuse ===
In August 2021, Mohale Motaung, detailed severe physical and psychological abuse in leaked audio recordings, including broken ribs, damaged teeth, and threats with a knife by Mhlongo. Mhlongo denied the allegations. Following the allegations, Mhlongo requested a leave of absence from his hosting duties at Metro FM.

=== Attacks on journalists ===
In January 2021, Mhlongo was condemned by the South African National Editor's Forum (SANEF) after publicly disclosing the private contact details and text conversations of two journalists. The reporters, Julia Madibogo of City Press and Kabelo Khumalo of Sunday World, had contacted Mhlongo for comments concerning accusations of physical and psychological abuse made by his former partner Mohale Motaung.

== Personal life ==
Mhlongo dated actress Palesa Madisakwane while in a relationship with an unnamed man. This led him to come out as bisexual. Madisakwane and Mhlongo welcomed their first child, Bahumi Madisakwane, on 19 February 1995. Mhlongo later described himself as gay, and the relationship with Madisakwane ended.

Mhlongo has kept his relationships private. However, in 2017 rumors surfaced that he was dating South African model and entrepreneur Mohale Tebogo Motaung. The two confirmed these rumors in 2018. Mhlongo proposed to Motaung while on their vacation in Paris, France. The two were married in a traditional wedding on 28 September 2019, and they had a white wedding on 30 January 2020. They later separated in 2021. In March 2023, Mhlongo withdrew his divorce from Motaung, because it was revealed that their marriage was not legal in the eyes of the law, despite having a public wedding.

== Filmography ==
=== Film ===
Year	Title	Role	Notes
1986	Scavengers	Jeffrey	
1992	Sarafina!	Fire	Credited as Somizi "Whacko" Mhlongo
1994	Kien Hiüber Afrika	Himself	Cameo appearance
1995	Cry, the Beloved Country	Young Thief	
2006	Black Beulahs	Himself	Television film

=== Television ===
Year	Title	Role	Notes
1993	African Skies	Juice	1 episode
1996	Tarzan: The Epic Adventures		1 episode
2004	Zero Tolerance	Danielle	
2007	City Ses'la	Madam Gigi	Guest
2010–2012	Dance Your Butt Off	Himself	Judge; all episodes
2013 and 2016	10 Over 10	Himself	Commentator; Season 1 and 4
2013	Zaziwa	Himself	Guest
2014	The Comedy Central Roast of Kenny Kunene	Himself	Roaster
2014	Reality Check	Himself	1 episode
2015	aYeYe	Baps	1 episode
2015–present	Idols South Africa	Himself	Judge
2015	All That BS	Himself	1 episode
2016–2018	South African Film and Television Awards	Himself	Red carpet host; performer in 2018
2016–present	Living the Dream with Somizi	Himself	Main role
2016	22nd South African Music Awards	Himself	Co-host
2017	23rd South African Music Awards	Himself	Co-host
2017–present	V Entertainment	Himself	Co-host
2018	The Comedy Central Roast of Somizi	Himself	Roastee
2018	24th South African Music Awards	Himself	Co-host
2018	Tropika Smooth Fan	Himself	Contestant
2018	Global Citizen Festival: Mandela 100	Himself	Red carpet host
2020	1st KZN Entertainment Awards	Himself	Co-host
2023	The Masked Singer South Africa	Himself	judge

== Choreography ==
- Miss South Africa
- Metro FM awards
- Afcon 2013 opening and closing ceremonies
- South African Music Award (SAMAs)
- Fifa World Cup 2010 opening and closing ceremonies
- Joyous Celebration

== Achievements ==
=== National Film and Television Awards ===
Year	Nominee / work	Award	Result	Ref.
2024	Himself	Celebrity Personality of the Year 2024	Pending	

== See also ==
- Theo Baloyi
- Mary Twala
