= Ndaba Mhlongo =

South African actor, comedian, assistant director and choreographer

- Born: Ndaba Walter Mhlongo; 4 July 1933; Inanda, KwaZulu-Natal, Union of South Africa
- Died: October 29, 1989 (aged 56); South Africa
- Occupations: actor; choreographer; comedian; assistant director
- Years active: 1970s–1989
- Known for: Inyakanyaka • Ngaka
- Spouse: Mary Twala (?–1989) his death
- Children: 2, incl. Somizi)

Ndaba Walter Mhlongo (3 July 1933 – 29 October 1989) was a South African actor and choreographer best known for his role of Mshefane in the 1977 production Inyakanyaka. Ndaba is widely regarded as one of South Africa's most prominent comedians. Joe Mafela, himself an established comedian, described Ndaba's comedy as effortless.

== Career ==
Mhlongo is well known for the comedy Inyakanyaka (meaning trouble), and the dramatic film uDeliwe in which he acted with his wife and son. His other known works include Isivumelwano, Upondo no Nkinsela, Bad Company, Strike Force and Ngaka

== Personal life ==
Mhlongo was married to actress Mary Twala. They had 2 children together; Archie and Somizi.

== Awards and nominations ==
Mhlongo received a Tony Award nomination for Best Choreography on Mbongeni Ngema's Sarafina! in 1988.

== Filmography ==
Year	Film	Role	Notes
1977	Inyakanyaka	Mshefane	
1978	Isivumelwano		
1980	Upondo no Nkinsela	Mpondo	
1985	Bad Company		
1986	Strike Force		
