= Dumisani Dlamini =

South African actor and dancer (born 1963)

- Born: 23 October 1963 (age 62); Durban, South Africa
- Occupations: Actor; dancer
- Years active: 1987–present
- Known for: Portraying Crocodile on Sarafina!
- Notable work: Yizo Yizo
- Children: Doja Cat

Dumisani Dlamini (Zulu: ['ɮamini]; born 23 October 1963) is a South African actor and dancer best known for playing Crocodile in Sarafina! (1992) and Chester on Yizo Yizo. He is the father of American singer and rapper Doja Cat.

== Career ==
Dlamini started his career in South Africa as a dancer which led him to be cast in the musical, Sarafina! which premiered in South Africa in 1987. His international career started when the musical became a Broadway production which led him to tour the U.S. from 28 January 1988 — 2 July 1989. His film career began when the play was adapted into the movie Sarafina! (1992) starring Whoopi Goldberg. He lived in the U.S. for a few years after the show ended and later returned to South Africa where he continued his work in the television and music industry. He is also credited as the producer and pianist on Linda Kekana's I am an African album which was released by Gallo Records in 2002. He started a career in television and has been acting for the past 30 years where he appeared in popular South African shows like Isibaya, Shaka Ilembe, and Yizo Yizo amongst others. He produced Mercy: Sex Appeal.

== Personal life ==
Dlamini is from Durban, South Africa and is of Zulu descent.

In the 1990s, in the course of a tour to the United States as a part of Mbongeni Ngema's cast and crew, Dlamini met painter and clothing designer, Deborah Sawyer and had a relationship with her before parting ways. Sawyer is the mother of his son Raman and daughter Amala, better known as the rapper and singer Doja Cat.

In 2023, at the age of 59, Dlamini paid a bride price (lobola) for his wife Ophelia Mulela on 2 September 2023; the couple held a private ceremony in Soweto, South Africa. He was previously engaged to Girlie Nhlengethwa and Nandi Ndlovu.

== Accolades ==
List of Accolades
Award / Film Festival	Year	Recipient	Project	Nomination	Result	Ref.
South African Film and Television Awards	2009	Himself	Usindiso	Golden Horn Award for Best Supporting Actor in a TV Drama	Nominated	
South African Film and Television Awards	2022	Himself	eHostela	Golden Horn Award for Best Actor in a TV Drama	Nominated	
