= Gcina Mhlophe =

South African playwright, author mime and poet (born 1958)

Dr.Gcina Mhlophe
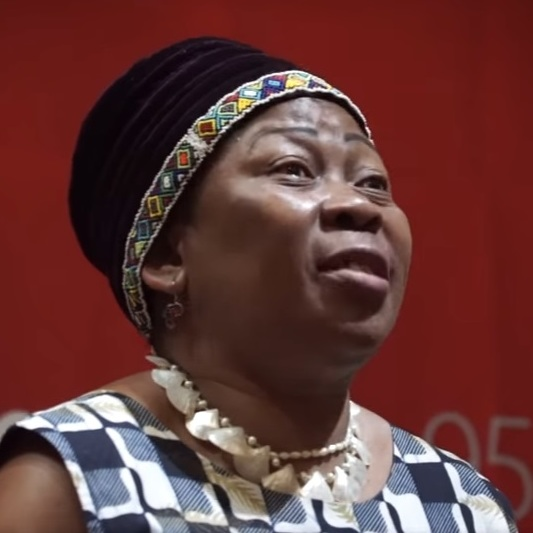
- Mhlophe at the Festival Internacional de Poesía de Medellín in 2016
- Born: Nokugcina Elsie Mhlophe; 24 October 1958 (age 67); KwaZulu-Natal, South Africa
- Occupations: anti-apartheid activist; actress; storyteller; poet; playwright; director; author
- Years active: 1988–present
- Notable work: Black Dog: Inj'emnyama
- Relatives: Sindiwe Magona
- Website: www.gcinamhlophe.co.za

Gcina Mhlophe (born 24 October 1958) is a South African storyteller, writer, playwright, and actress. In 2016, she was listed as one of BBC's 100 Women. She tells her stories in four of South Africa's languages: English, Afrikaans, Zulu and Xhosa, and also helps to motivate children to read.

== Early life ==
Nokugcina Elsie Mhlophe was born on 24 October 1958 in Hammarsdale, KwaZulu-Natal, to a Xhosa mother and a Zulu father. Gcina's father worked at an oil company in Jacobs, South Durban basin, while her mother worked as a domestic worker. Born out of wedlock, she was separated from her mother at the age of 2, and went to live with her father, who was married with 8 children.

She started her working life as a domestic worker, and did not visit a library until she was 20 years old .

== Career ==
Mhlophe worked as a newsreader at the Press Trust and BBC Radio. From 1982-1983, she was a writer for the "Learn and Teach" magazine.

She began to get a sense of the demand for stories while in Chicago in 1988. She performed at a library in a mostly-Black neighborhood, where an ever-growing audience kept inviting her back. Still, Mhlophe only began to think of storytelling as a career after meeting an Imbongi, one of the legendary poets of African folklore, and after encouragement by Mannie Manim, the then-director of the Market Theatre, Johannesburg. From 1989 to 1990, she was resident director at the Market Theatre.

Mhlophe has appeared in theatres from Soweto to London, and much of her work has been translated into German, French, Italian, Swahili, and Japanese. She has travelled extensively in Africa and other parts of the world giving storytelling workshops.

Mhlophe's stories meld folklore, information, current affairs, song, and idiom. Storytelling is a deeply traditional activity in South Africa, and Mhlophe is one of the few woman storytellers in a country dominated by males. She does her work through charismatic performances, working to preserve storytelling as a means of keeping history alive and encouraging South African children to read. She tells her stories in four of South Africa's languages: English, Afrikaans, Zulu and Xhosa.

Her writing has appeared in collections including A Land Apart: A South African Reader (eds André Brink and J. M. Coetzee, London: Faber and Faber, 1986), Daughters of Africa (ed. Margaret Busby, London: Jonatan Cape, 1992) and Women Writing Africa: The Southern Region (ed. Margaret Daymond, Johannesburg: Witwatersrand University Press, 2002).

== Other activities ==
Mhlophe mentors' young people, developing young talent to carry forward the work of storytelling through the Zanendaba ("Bring me a story") Initiative. This initiative, established in 2002, is a collaboration with the Market Theatre and READ, a national literacy organization.

She currently serves as the patron of the ASSITEJ South Africa, the International Association for Theatre for Children and Young People.

She runs a performance space called "The Storytelling Tree" in Durban.

She also works as a motivational speaker.

== Recognition and awards ==
From 2019, Mhlophe's birthday, 24 October, is recognized as National Storytelling Day in South Africa.

As of 2023, Mhlophe has been awarded honorary doctorates from seven universities across the world. These include:

- 1999: Open University, UK
- 1999: University of Natal
- 2012: University of Johannesburg
- 2014: Rhodes University
- 2018: Nelson Mandela University
- 2024: Durban University of Technology
- University of Pretoria

Other recognition of her work includes:

- 1987: Obie Award for Distinguished Performance by an Actress (New York City) for Born in the RSA
- 1988: Joseph Jefferson Award for Best Actress (Chicago) for Have you seen Zandile?
- 198?: Sony Award for Radio Drama from BBC Radio Africa for Have you seen Zandile?
- 1990: Fringe First Award (Edinburgh) for Have you seen Zandile?
- 1991: Nominee, Noma Award, for Queen of the Tortoises
- 1991, Ashoka Fellowship (social entrepreneurship innovator)
- 1994: Book Chat Award for Molo Zoleka
- 2016: Named as one of BBC's 100 Women
- 2018: Inaugural USIBA Cultural Legend Award, from the Minister of Arts and Culture
- SAFTA Lifetime Achievement Award.

== Selected performances ==
- 1983, lead role in Umongikazi: The Nurse, by Maishe Maponya
- 1984, in Black Dog: Inj'emnyama
- 1986, Place of Weeping (film)
- 1986, Have You Seen Zandile? (autobiographical play, at the Market Theatre, Johannesburg, Mhlophe as Zandile)
- 1987, Born in the RSA (New York)
- 1989, storytelling festival at the Market Theatre
- 1989, performed a poem in honor of Albert Luthuli, 1960 Nobel Peace Prize winner
- 1990, performed Have You Seen Zandile? at the Edinburgh Festival tour through Europe and the USA
- 1997, Poetry Africa, presenting poet
- 1999, guest speaker at the Perth Writers Festival
- 2000, performed in Peter und der Wolf at the Komische Oper (Berlin)
- 2002, The Bones of Memory (performance, history-telling from the old and new South Africa)
- 2003, lectured on storytelling at the Eye of the Beholder seminar
- 2003, Mata Mata (performance, family musical)
- 2006, FIFA World Cup South African handover ceremony, Germany
- 2016, Kalushi (film)
- 2017, Liyana, a multimedia film by Aaron Kopp

=== Documentary appearances ===
- Acted and narrated in Travelling Songs
- 1990, performed poetry in Songololo: Voices of Change (how aspects of culture in South Africa have become part of the anti-apartheid struggle)
- 1993, The Travelling Song (the contemporary process of story gathering)
- Appeared in Literacy Alive
- Appeared in Art Works

== Recordings ==
Mhlophe wrote music for her SABC TV series Gcina & Friends

- 1993, Music for Little People (CD)
- 1993, reader voice Not so fast, Songololo (videorecording), Weston Woods, Weston CT, Scholastic
- 1994, The Gift of the Tortoise (contributed to the Ladysmith Black Mambazo album)
- 2002, Fudukazi's Magic screened in Durban at the African Union Film Festival

== Collaborations ==
- Pops Mohamed, musician and tribal music preservationist
- Ladysmith Black Mambazo, choir group, The Gift of the Tortoise (CD), 1994 and Music for Little People in America (CD), 1993
- Anant Singh, video producer, Fudukazi's Magic (CD and video for German audiences)

== Bibliography ==
- The Toilet 1987 (short story)
- Molo! Zoleka New Africa Education, 1994. (Children's book)
- MaZanendaba and the Magical Story Shell (Children's book)
- The Snake with Seven Heads. Johannesburg: Skotaville Publishers, 1989. (Children's book, translated into five African languages, the English edition is required in all South African school libraries)
- Have you seen Zandile?. Portsmouth, NH: Heinemann, 1990. (Play, based on her childhood, required in South African university libraries)
- Queen of the Tortoises. Johannesburg: Skotaville, 1990. (Children's book)
- The Singing Dog. Illustrated by Erica Maritz and Andries Maritz. Johannesburg: Skotaville, 1992. (Children's book)
- Nalohima, the Deaf Tortoise. Gamsberg Macmillan, 1999.
- Fudukazi's Magic. Cambridge: Cambridge University Press, 1999. (CD – lyrics and music, performance)
- Fudukazi's Magic. Cambridge University Press, 2000 (CD – lyrics and music, performance, for German audiences)
- Nozincwadi, Mother of Books. Maskew Miller Longman, 2001. (CD and book, South African roadshow to rural schools)
- African Mother of Christmas. Maskew Miller Longman, 2002. (CD and book)
- Love Child. Durban: University of Natal Press, 2002. (Memoir, collection of stories)
- Stories of Africa. University of Natal Press, 2003. (Children's book)
- Queen of Imbira. Maskew Miller Longman, 2003. (Children's book)
- Songs & Stories of Africa – South African Music Awards Winner 2010 for Best English Kids Album – African Cream Music

== See also ==
- List of African writers
- Famous South African people
- Poetry Africa

== What inspired her in writing ==
- Official website
- Badilisha Poetry Exchange Profile and podcast
