= Close harmony (disambiguation) =

Close harmony is an arrangement of the notes of chords within a narrow range.

Close Harmony may also refer to:

- Close Harmony (1929 film), a black and white American comedy-drama musical film
- Close Harmony (1981 film), a 1981 short documentary film
- Close Harmony (album), a 1992 box set of The Louvin Brothers recordings
