= Anant Singh =

Anant Singh may refer to:

- Anant Kumar Singh, Indian politician
- Anant Singh (film producer), South African film producer
- Anant Prasad Singh, Indian politician

== See also ==
- Anant Singh Pathania, Indian Army general
