= Muzi KaChibi Mthabela =

South African actor and editor

- Born: 2 April 1977 (age 49)
- Education: Mukhanyo Theological College
- Known for: Role as Duma Ngema in Isibaya; South African Film and Television Award (SAFTA) winner for editing

Muzi KaChibi Mthabela (born 2 April 1977) is a South African actor, video editor, former model, and motivational speaker. He is best known for his role as Duma Ngema on the Mzansi Magic telenovela Isibaya, as well as his award-winning work in television post-production.

== Early life and background ==
Mthabela was born in Eshowe and raised in Clermont and eMandeni, in the KwaZulu-Natal province of South Africa. Raised by a single mother alongside his siblings, he experienced a challenging upbringing and struggled with substance abuse during his youth before turning to faith. Mthabela was raised in a Catholic family and initially aspired to enter the priesthood before pursuing a career in the media and entertainment industry.

== Career ==
=== Film editing ===
Mthabela moved to Johannesburg, Gauteng, in 1999 to pursue opportunities in entertainment. Before making his screen acting debut, he worked for over a decade in post-production as a film and television editor. In 2014, he won a South African Film and Television Award (SAFTA) for Best Achievement in Post Production and Editing for his work on Isibaya.

=== Acting ===
Mthabela transitioned to full-time acting when he was cast as Duma Ngema, a central character in the drama series Isibaya. Following this breakthrough role, he appeared in several other prominent South African television productions, including Harvest, Imbewu: The Seed, Generations: The Legacy, and Emzini: A Family Legacy.

Throughout his career, Mthabela has also made guest and recurring appearances on numerous television series, including Jacob's Cross, Dream World, The Road, Sokhulu & Partners, Ashes to Ashes, Saints and Sinners, Loxion Lyric, Tempy Pushas, and Muvhango.

In 2013, he starred in the Lokshin Bioskop film Thug Huis, which aired on Mzansi Magic alongside Khanyi Mbau, Lolo Mphephi, and Siphiwe Mtshali. He landed his first television starring role in 2017 in the e.tv drama series Harvest, playing Richard, a man seeking revenge. In addition to dramatic roles, he appeared as a celebrity guest trainer on the reality series Bootcamp Mzansi (2015) and was featured on the SABC1 interview series Zaziwa.

=== Public speaking and ministry ===
Besides his television career, Mthabela works as a public speaker, addressing themes of faith, youth development, and positive masculinity. In 2026, he completed a Higher Certificate in Biblical Teaching at Mukhanyo Theological College.

== Personal life ==
Mthabela has been married for 19 years and frequently speaks publicly about his Christian faith and Zulu cultural heritage.

== Filmography ==
=== As an actor ===
- Isibaya – Duma Ngema
- Harvest – Richard
- Imbewu: The Seed
- Generations: The Legacy
- Emzini: A Family Legacy
- Muvhango – Richard (Guest role)

=== As an editor ===
- Isibaya

== Accolades ==
- 2014 – South African Film and Television Awards: Best Achievement in Post-Production and Editing (TV Soap) for Isibaya
