= Prey (2007 film) =

- Official teaser poster
- Directed by: Darrell Roodt
- Written by: Jeff Wadlow; Beau Bauman; Darrell Roodt
- Produced by: Bernice Spring; Anant Singh
- Starring: Carly Schroeder; Peter Weller; Bridget Moynahan
- Cinematography: Michael Brierley
- Edited by: Avril Beukes; Ryan Kushner
- Music by: Tony Humecke
- Production companies: Anant Singh Production; Videovision Entertainment; Distant Horizon; Ingenious Film Partners
- Distributed by: The Weinstein Company
- Release date: 30 January 2007 (United States)
- Running time: 92 minutes
- Country: South Africa
- Languages: English; Afrikaans
- Box office: $3.6 million

Prey is a 2007 South African adventure thriller horror film directed by Darrell Roodt and written by Roodt, Jeff Wadlow and Beau Bauman. At a South African game reserve, a woman and her two stepchildren are trapped inside a car by a pride of hungry lions. Prey stars Bridget Moynahan, Peter Weller and Carly Schroeder.

== Plot ==
Tom Newman and his family arrive at a resort in South Africa. Tom is a hydro-electrical engineer who has been hired to help build a nearby dam. He hopes that this trip will help his daughter Jessica and new wife Amy get closer, as Jessica blames Amy for her parents' divorce.

The next morning, Amy, Jessica and her brother David go on a game drive with Brian, a ranger. While taking a bathroom break, Brian and David encounter a pride of lions and Brian is killed. Amy, Jessica, and David are unable to drive away as Brian had the car keys. The pride attempt to break into the car but are unsuccessful. That night Tom is informed of his family's disappearance by the lodge staff and, at the suggestion of the park rangers, contacts Crawford, a professional hunter and guide.

The next morning, the park rangers begin their search by helicopter and Tom hires Crawford to help with the search. David spots the car keys and Amy is able to retrieve them, but is chased back to the car by a lioness. Panicked, Amy drives further into the bush and accidentally wrecks the car. When the rangers fly over the car without noticing them, Jessica gets out and tries to draw their attention. Amy goes to bring her back and they are charged by a lioness before it is killed by two native hunters.

Amy is suspicious of the newcomers and gets back in the car, believing they may be poachers. Jessica convinces one of the hunters to lead her to a nearby watering hole and help her fill some gourds with water. They rush back to the car after hearing a gunshot and find that the other hunter is missing. The remaining hunter leaves to search for him and Jessica gets back in the car. Tom and Crawford are unable to find any tracks from the car due to the previous night's rain and setup camp on the veld.

That night, at Jessica's request, Amy shares how she met Tom. Assuring her that Tom was already separated from Jessica and David's mom at the time they met, Amy and Jessica reconcile. The remaining hunter returns and gets in the car, but is dragged out and killed after a lion smashes through the previously weakened windshield. They move the front seat of the car forward to cover the hole.

The next morning Amy hears Tom and Crawford's car and successfully gets their attention. Tom is confronted by a lioness after rushing ahead of Crawford. As it leaps, Crawford shoots and kills it, but is then killed by the male lion. Tom makes it to the car with the male lion in pursuit and crawls underneath to escape. Amy breaks open the gas tank and sets a trap with a cloth fuse. She then lures the lion into the car, allowing everyone else run to a nearby tree, before lighting the fuse and killing the lion in the resulting explosion. The family walks back to Crawford's car together.

== Cast ==
- Bridget Moynahan as Amy Newman
- Peter Weller as Tom Newman
- Carly Schroeder as Jessica Newman
- Jamie Bartlett as Crawford
- Conner Dowds as David Newman
- Marius Roberts as Brian, A Ranger
- Muso Sefatsa as Nephew
- Tumisho K. Masha as Ranger At Airport
- Jacob Makgoba as Local Hunter

== Production ==
The film was inspired by the true story of the Tsavo Man-Eaters during the colonial era. It was filmed on location in Gauteng and Limpopo in South Africa.

=== Soundtrack ===
The soundtrack includes Ron Brettel with "Awaken" and "Zulu Jive" by Urban Rhythm Factory. American synth-pop artist Tony Humecke composed the official score.

== Release ==
The film was released theatrically overseas and grossed $3.6 million.

=== Home media ===
Prey premiered on 3 November 2006 as part of the American Film Market. The film was released straight-to-video in the United States on DVD on 30 January 2007, by The Weinstein Company. Prey was released on DVD in Europe on 10 November 2007, by Sony Pictures Home Entertainment. The film was later released on Blu-ray on 28 September 2010 by Vivendi Visual Entertainment.

== Reception ==
=== Critical response ===
The film was critically panned, earning a 17% on Rotten Tomatoes. Paul A. Newman of PNselling wrote in his review: "A bad, bad movie with a cool concept. 'Really' bad. In fact I'm debating recutting the movie and changing the dialog and renaming it as "Prey, Pray, Pway" and releasing it as a comedy because this movie is really, really close to being unsuccessful and/or hilarious."
