= Father Hood =

- Theatrical release poster
- Directed by: Darrell James Roodt
- Written by: Scott Spencer
- Produced by: Gillian Gorfil; Nicholas Pileggi; Anant Singh
- Starring: Patrick Swayze; Halle Berry; Diane Ladd
- Cinematography: Mark Vicente
- Edited by: David Heitner
- Music by: Patrick O'Hearn
- Production company: Hollywood Pictures
- Distributed by: Buena Vista Pictures Distribution
- Release date: August 27, 1993
- Running time: 95 minutes
- Country: United States
- Language: English
- Box office: $3.4 million

Father Hood is a 1993 American comedy-drama film directed by Darrell Roodt, from a screenplay by Scott Spencer (of Endless Love fame). The movie stars Patrick Swayze and Halle Berry.

== Plot ==
Two years after his children became wards of the state of California following his wife's death, petty criminal Jack Charles meets with his attorney to discuss his impending jail sentence for robbing an undercover policeman posing as a drug dealer. Afterwards, he encounters his 12-year-old daughter Kelly, who has escaped from the Bigelow Hall juvenile center, at his Los Angeles apartment. He ignores her pleas to him to have her and her seven-year-old brother Eddie transferred to a different facility instead of the abusive, prison-like confines of Bigelow, planning to instead steal $250,000 from a drug dealer in New Orleans, Louisiana. On the way back to Bigelow, he changes his mind and goes to court to request their transfer.

While the judge doubts his claims that Bigelow staff handcuffs the children, Kelly and Jack observe Lazzaro, the Bigelow overseer, shackling Eddie and the orphans and loading them onto a bus. Furious, Jack intercepts Lazzaro and holds him at gunpoint until he releases Eddie and Kelly’s pregnant friend, Delores. Evading police, Jack drops Delores at her former foster house. In Las Vegas, Nevada, he finds his mother Rita gambling in a casino and pulls her away from the table before a security guard can apprehend her for cheating. Shocked to meet her grandchildren, she agrees to let them stay overnight. In the morning, she alerts him that several newspaper headlines are labeling him a "madman", forcing his family to continue east. When a police officer spots them, a high-speed car chase ensues. Jack stops at the Hoover Dam and telephones Kathleen Mercer, who wrote one of the newspaper articles, about her erroneous reporting. When police arrive, Jack rigs another tourist’s car to drive over the cliff, leading onlookers to believe he perished in the resulting explosion, before stealing another car and heading with the children to New Orleans. At a roadside bar, Jack again telephones Kathleen to dispute certain points she published about Kelly's previous life in foster care, and Kathleen eagerly asks him to question his daughter about Bigelow's problematic disciplining policies. Upon hearing that Delores has been seized from her foster mother and returned to Bigelow, Kathleen investigates the institution for corruption. Meanwhile, an exhausted Jack forces Kelly to drive. Just after daybreak, she crashes the car while swerving to avoid collision with a semi-trailer truck.

Escaping on foot, the fugitives board a speedboat hitched to another traveler’s pickup truck, and as they eat the owner's food, Kelly defensively denies to Jack that she was ever sexually abused in Bigelow. When the driver stops, Jack calls Kathleen via payphone, informing her of his suspicion that his daughter was mistreated, but then the owner of the boat drives away with the children still onboard. Jack eventually catches up to them, but Kelly is annoyed that his reckless behavior is setting a bad example for Eddie. Once the boat is docked in a Louisiana lake, Jack starts the engine and hijacks the vessel through the wetlands. Kelly ignites a flare gun, enabling them to jump overboard undetected and escape to New Orleans to find Jack's contact, Jerry. Phoning Kathleen, Jack learns that his lawyer has negotiated a reduced two-year sentence if he agrees to return to Los Angeles and testify against Lazzaro's corrupt foster care system. The next day, Jack and Jerry drive onto a ferryboat to meet the drug dealers they intend to rob, hoping to garner enough money to start afresh in Belize. During the operation, however, Jack realizes his children are in the trunk and gets out of the car to release them; the drug dealers flee, shooting Jerry in the scuffle. Although Jack considers killing them and stealing the money for himself, he ultimately decides against it.

Back in Los Angeles, Lazzaro appears in court, asserting that Kelly is a "troubled youth". After a brief meeting, Jack and Kathleen barge into the courtroom, and Jack, assisted by Kelly's implication that Lazzaro witnessed and subsequently ignored her sexual assault at Bigelow, offers his defense, emotionally pleading for full custody of his children after he completes his sentence. On the day of his release, Kelly and Eddie wait with Kathleen outside the prison and greet him with a hug.

== Cast ==
- Patrick Swayze as Jack Charles, Kelly & Eddie's widowed father
- Halle Berry as Kathleen Mercer
- Sabrina Lloyd as Kelly Charles, Jack's daughter
- Brian Bonsall as Eddie Charles, Jack's son
- Michael Ironside as Jerry
- Bob Gunton as Lazzaro
- Diane Ladd as Rita Charles, Jack's mother and Kelly & Eddie's paternal grandmother
- Adrienne Barbeau as Celeste
- Georgann Johnson as Judge Anna Barron
- Marvin J. McIntyre as Skinny Guy
- William Bumiller as Travis
- Vanessa Marquez as Delores, Kelly's friend
- Martha Velez-Johnson as Mrs. Carter
- Joshua Lucas as Andy

== Locations ==
Father Hood was shot in Los Angeles, California, Hoover Dam, Arizona-Nevada Border, Las Vegas, Nevada, Rio Medina, Texas, and New Orleans, Louisiana.

== Release ==
=== Critical reception ===
The film was released in North America on August 27, 1993 to generally unfavorable reviews from critics. On Rotten Tomatoes it holds a score of 10% based on 20 reviews, with an average rating of 2.8/10.

=== Box office ===
Father Hood opened at No. 15 at the North American box office, with only $1,286,806 on its opening weekend. Its widest release was 643 theaters. By the end of its run, the film has grossed $3,418,141 worldwide.
