= Place of Weeping =

1986 South African drama film

- Directed by: Darrell Roodt
- Written by: Darrell Roodt
- Story by: Darrell Roodt; Les Volpe
- Produced by: Anant Singh
- Starring: James Whyle; Gcina Mhlophe; Charles Comyn; Norman Coombes; Michelle du Toit; Kerneels Coertzen; Patrick Shai
- Cinematography: Paul Witte
- Edited by: David Heitner
- Music by: Lloyd Ross
- Production company: Place of Weeping Productions
- Distributed by: Aquarius TV (1993) (Greece) (TV); Highlight Video (West Germany) (VHS); New World Pictures (all media)
- Release date: 5 December 1986; (USA)
- Running time: 88 minutes
- Country: South Africa
- Languages: Afrikaans; English; Zulu

Place of Weeping (theatrically as Afrika - Land der Hoffnung), is a 1986 South African drama film directed by Darrell Roodt and produced by Anant Singh for Place of Weeping Productions. The film stars James Whyle, Gcina Mhlophe and Charles Comyn in the lead roles, and Norman Coombes, Michelle du Toit, Kerneels Coertzen and Patrick Shai in supportive roles. The film describes in detail the multicultural groups in South Africa and how South Africa collapsed and the strife in South Africa's oppressive regime.

This is the first anti-apartheid motion picture made entirely in South Africa. The film had its premiere on 5 December 1986. The film received positive reviews from critics.

== Cast ==
- James Whyle as Philip Seago
- Gcina Mhlophe as Gracie
- Charles Comyn as Tokkie van Rensburg
- Norman Coombes as Father Eagen
- Michelle du Toit as Maria van Rensburg
- Kerneels Coertzen as Public Prosecutor
- Patrick Shai as Lucky
- Ramolao Makhene as Themba
- Siphiwe Khumalo as Joseph
- Doreen Mazibuko as Young Girl
- Thoko Ntshinga as Joseph's Widow
- Elaine Proctor as Journalist
- Ian Steadman as Dave, Editor
- Marcel van Heerden as Cafe Owner
- Arms Seutcoau as Faction Fighter
- Nandi Nyembe as Young Girl's Mother
- Ernest Ndlovu as Man with Gun
- Nicky Rebelo as Farmer 1
- Sean Taylor as Farmer 2
