= Leleti Khumalo =

South African actress (born 1970)

- Born: 30 March 1970 (age 56); Durban, South Africa
- Occupation: Actress
- Years active: 1988–present
- Known for: Sarafina!
- Spouses: Skhuthazo Winston Khanyile (m. 2012) Mbongeni Ngema (m. 1992; div. 2005)
- Children: 2

Leleti Khumalo (born 30 March 1970) is a South African actress known for her leading role in the movie and stage play Sarafina! and for her roles in other films including Hotel Rwanda, Yesterday and Invictus, as well as the soap opera Imbewu: The Seed, where she plays Nokubonga "MaZulu" Bhengu and on Uzalo as MaNzuza, and currently on Muvhango as Dr Ximba.

== Early life and Sarafina! ==
Khumalo was born in KwaMashu township, north of Durban, South Africa. Showing an interest in performing from an early age, she joined a youth backyard dance group called Amajika, mentored by Tu Nokwe.

In 1985 she auditioned for the Mbongeni Ngema musical which was to become the international blockbuster Sarafina!; Ngema wrote the lead character of Sarafina for Khumalo. She later married him, but they divorced. She is currently married to businessman Skhutazo Winston Khanyile and she gave birth to their twins Ulwenzile and Yamukelani Khanyile.

Khumalo performed the role of Sarafina on stages in South Africa and on Broadway, where she received a 1988 Tony Award nomination for Best Actress in a Musical. Sarafina! had a Broadway run lasting two years, after which the production embarked on a worldwide tour. In 1987 Khumalo received an NAACP Image Award for Best Stage Actress. In 1992, she starred alongside Whoopi Goldberg, Miriam Makeba and John Kani in Darrell James Roodt's film version of Sarafina!, which had a worldwide distribution, and became the biggest film production to be released on the African continent. Khumalo was nominated for an Image Award, together with Angela Bassett, Whoopi Goldberg and Janet Jackson. Based on the 1976 Soweto youth uprisings, Sarafina! tells the story of a young school girl who is not afraid to fight for her rights and inspires her peers to rise up in protest, especially after her inspirational teacher, Mary Masombuka (Goldberg) is imprisoned and murdered.

In 1993, Khumalo released her first album, Leleti and Sarafina.

Sarafina! was re-released in South Africa on 16 June 2006 to commemorate the 30th anniversary of the youth uprisings in Soweto.

== Subsequent roles ==
Khumalo co-starred in Mbongeni Ngema's international musical Magic at 4 AM which was dedicated to Muhammad Ali. She subsequently starred in another Ngema musical, Mama (1996), which toured Europe and Australia. In 1997, she starred in Sarafina 2.

Khumalo starred in the 2004 movies Hotel Rwanda and Yesterday; the latter was nominated for a 2005 Academy Award in the category "Best Foreign Language Film". Yesterday also scooped the Best Film award at India's Pune International Film Festival and had positive reactions at the Venice and Toronto International Film Festivals.

Khumalo joined the cast of one of South Africa's longest running soap operas, Generations in 2005 as Busiswe (Busi) Dlomo, a refined and altruistic no-nonsense woman who heads up her own publishing empire, based in Cape Town. Her character is the younger sister to Sibusiso Dlomo and has none of the power-hungry, egotistical and callous characteristics he (Sibusiso) has. She has used her intellect and savvy to get where she is today, at the helm of South Africa's fictional top communications company, Ezweni, which she runs with her brother and founder Karabo Moroka.

In 2015 Khumalo joined the cast of Uzalo and played as Zandile "MaNzuza" Mdletshe. The role marked her first on-screen appearance after a two-year hiatus from acting to raise her children.

In 2015 Leleti was invited to Zanzibar Island, Tanzania, as a chief guest of the famous African film festivals known as the Zanzibar film Festivals, for its 18th anniversary celebrations.

She played a role of Mazulu on e.tv's Imbewu, from 2018 until the series' end in 2023.

In July 2024, she bagged a role of Dr. Ximba on an upcoming new season of telenova Muvhango.

== Filmography ==
Year	Title	Role	Notes
1988	Voices of Sarafina!	Sarafina	Documentary
1992	Sarafina!	Sarafina	
1995	Cry, the Beloved Country	Katie	
2004	Yesterday	Yesterday Khumalo	
2004	Hotel Rwanda	Fedens	
2005	Faith's Corner	Faith	
2005	Generations	Busisiwe Mhlongo	
2009	Invictus	Mary	
2010	Africa united	sister Ndebele	
2010	Hopeville	Flo	
2011	Winnie Mandela	Adelaide Tambo	
2015–2018	Uzalo	Zandile Mdletshe	
2016	Free State	Maria	
2016	Cry of Love	Zenzi	
2018–14 April 2023	Imbewu: The Seed	Nokubonga "Mazulu" Bhengu	274 episodes
2024	Muvhango	Dr. Ximba	

== Awards and nominations ==
=== Simon Sabela KZN Film & TV Awards ===
Year	Nominee / work	Award	Result	Ref.
2024	Dear Future Wife	Best actress Film	Nominated	

Nominated tony awards 1988

=== Golden Elephant Awards ===
Year	Nominee / work	Award	Result	Ref.
2024	Herself	Lifetime Achievement	Won	

AWARDS AND RECOGNITION

Leleti Khumalo was awarded an Honorary Doctor of Laws (LLD) (honoris causa) by Rhodes University in 2026. This honorary degree was conferred in recognition of her outstanding contribution to South African theatre, film, and television, as well as her significant role in using storytelling to highlight the social realities of the country.
