= Nigel Noble =

English director and producer (born 1943)

- Born: 1943 (age 82–83); Blackpool, England
- Occupations: Sound mixer Film director Film producer
- Years active: 1966-present

Nigel Noble (born 1943) is an English sound mixer, film director and producer. He won an Academy Award in 1982 for Close Harmony in the category of Best Documentary Short Subject. Seven years later his film Voices of Sarafina! was screened in the Un Certain Regard section at the 1989 Cannes Film Festival.

== Selected filmography ==
- Close Harmony (1981)
- A Stitch for Time (1987)
- Voices of Sarafina! (1988)
- Porgy and Bess; An American Voice (1998)
- Os Carvoeiros (2000) (The Charcoal People)
- Gangs Escaping the Life (2001)
- Portraits of Grief (2002)
- The Beauty Academy of Kabul (2005)
- They Killed Sister Dorothy (2008)
- The Porch Light Project (2013)
