= Yesterday (2004 film) =

2004 South African drama film

- Yesterday film poster
- Directed by: Darrell Roodt
- Written by: Darrell Roodt
- Produced by: Anant Singh; Helena Spring
- Starring: Leleti Khumalo; Harriet Lenabe
- Distributed by: HBO Films (USA)
- Release date: 3 September 2004
- Running time: 96 minutes
- Country: South Africa
- Language: Zulu

Yesterday is a 2004 South African drama film written and directed by Darrell Roodt. The film tells a story of a young mother, Yesterday (Leleti Khumalo), who discovers she has AIDS. Her husband, a migrant mine laborer, rejected her despite being the one that infected her. Her ambition becomes to live long enough to see her daughter, Beauty, go to school.

This film is the first commercial feature-length production in Zulu. It was nominated for the Best Foreign Language Film category at the 77th Academy Awards. It also won Best Sound and Best Editing at the inaugural edition of the Africa Movie Academy Awards.

== Plot ==
Yesterday, a Zulu mother residing with her seven-year-old daughter, Beauty, in Rooihoek, a rural village in Zululand, South Africa, spends her days toiling in the fields, fetching water, and managing household chores while caring for her daughter. She forms a bond with the new village teacher.

Struggling with a persistent cough and weakness, Yesterday makes a long trek to the local clinic with Beauty, only to be turned away without seeing a doctor. When she collapses at home, Beauty seeks help from the teacher, who advises Yesterday to revisit the clinic. With the teacher's support, Yesterday reaches the clinic early the next day.

At the clinic, the doctor inquires about Yesterday's name, given by her father who believed in better times past. She learns she has AIDS, likely contracted from her husband working in a mine. Devastated, Yesterday resolves to inform her husband but faces violence upon doing so. She continues caring for her family, supported by her teacher friend.

Months later, John returns home, also sick. He apologizes for his previous actions, revealing his dismissal from the mine due to his illness. Villagers ostracize him, prompting Yesterday to construct a makeshift hospital on a nearby hill. Despite efforts, John dies.

Yesterday shifts her focus to preparing Beauty for school, her own education dreams unfulfilled. She vows to live to see Beauty attend school. When informed of her resilient health, Yesterday attributes it to her mindset. The film ends as Yesterday watches Beauty's first day at school.

== Credited cast ==
- Kenneth Khambula as John Khumalo, Yesterday's Husband
- Leleti Khumalo as Yesterday
- Harriet Lenabe as Teacher
- Lihle Mvelase as Beauty
- Camilla Walker as Female Doctor

== Awards ==
- "Best Film" at the 3rd Pune International Film Festival in India.
- Won EIUC Award at the 61st Venice International Film Festival.
- Awards for Best Sound, Best Makeup, and Best Editing at the 1st Africa Movie Academy Awards.
- Nominated for Best Foreign Language Film at the 77th Academy Awards.
- Nominated for Outstanding Made for Television Movie at the 58th Primetime Emmy Awards.
- Won a Peabody Award in 2005.
