= Barry Harman =

American screenwriter, lyricist, director

Barry Michael Harman
- Born: March 14, 1952 (age 74); Brooklyn, New York, U.S.
- Occupations: Television screenwriter/producer, Broadway theatre lyricist
- Years active: 1973–present

Barry Michael Harman (born March 14, 1952) is an American writer and producer for television and a book writer and lyricist for Broadway theater. He wrote and directed the Broadway musical Romance/Romance, which starred actor Scott Bakula and actress Alison Fraser, and which received five Tony Award nominations (including Best Musical, Best Lyrics, and Best Book), four Outer Critics Circle Awards and a Drama Desk nomination for Best Lyrics. He was nominated for a 1992 Joseph Jefferson Award for Director of a Musical for Romance/Romance at the Apple Tree Theatre in Chicago, Illinois.

His off-Broadway musical Olympus On My Mind won him an Outer Critics Circle Award for Best Lyrics and received three Drama Desk nominations. His work in television includes winning Emmy Awards on his first professional job, working a staff writer on The Carol Burnett Show. He won an Emmy Award for an episode of All in the Family, and he also co-wrote the premiere episode of The Jeffersons.

He is known for writing Clifford the Big Red Dog (2000), The Carol Burnett Show (1967), and Allegra's Window (1994). His work also includes 151 different songs for the 65 episodes of the Jem and the Holograms animated series (1985-1988).
