= Liyana (film) =

- Theatrical release poster
- Directed by: Aaron Kopp; Amanda Kopp
- Produced by: Daniel Junge; Aaron Kopp; Amanda Kopp; Sakheni Dlamini; Davis Coombe
- Starring: Gcina Mhlophe
- Cinematography: Aaron Kopp
- Edited by: Davis Coombe; Aaron Kopp
- Music by: Philip Miller
- Production company: Intaba Creative
- Distributed by: Abramorama
- Release dates: June 17, 2017 (LAFF); October 10, 2018 (United States)
- Running time: 77 minutes
- Countries: Eswatini, United States
- Language: English
- Box office: $44,045

Liyana is a 2017 Swazi documentary film directed and produced by Aaron Kopp and Amanda Kopp, following a group of Swazi orphans as they construct a narrative based on their own experiences. After premiering at the 2017 LA Film Festival, the film was released in the United States on October 10, 2018. It received highly positive reviews and won the award for Best Documentary Feature at the 2017 LAFF, as well as numerous other festival awards.

== Synopsis ==
Liyana follows a number of orphaned Swazi children as they develop a story under the guidance of South African author and activist Gcina Mhlope. Their narrative stars a fictional young girl, Liyana, as she embarks on a journey to rescue her younger twin brothers from kidnapping with her pet bull, and overcomes various challenges along the way. As the students develop their tale, the live action documentary is interspersed with animated scenes depicting Liyana's adventure.

== Reception ==
On review aggregator website Rotten Tomatoes, the film holds an approval rating of 98% based on 41 reviews, and an average rating of 8.3/10. On Metacritic, the film has a weighted average score of 80 out of 100, based on 10 critics, indicating "generally favorable reviews".
