= Dinner at Somizi's =

2020 South African television show

Dinners at Somizi's is a South African cooking and lifestyle chat show hosted by Somizi Mhlongo. It debuted on 10 July 2020 on 1Magic (DStv Channel 103).

== Premise ==
On the show, Somizi invites prominent media figures, musicians, and personalities into home to prepare meals, mix drinks, and engage in candid conversations about their lives, careers, and the South African entertainment industry.

== Production ==
Attribute	Details
Host	Somizi Mhlongo (with minor appearances by Mohale Motaung)
Production House	The BarLeader Group (BarLeader TV)
Lead Producer / Executive	Legend Manqele (Nkululeko "Legend" Manqele)
Original Network	1Magic (DStv Channel 103) & Mzansi Magic (DStv Channel 161), streaming on Showmax
Premiered	10 July 2020
Stopped Airing	October, 2020 (Season 1 ended); Season 2 put on hold in early 2021

== Feature guests ==
Season 1 featured high-profile South African public figures and celebrities:

- Rami Chuene
- Siya Kolisi
- Zahara
- Cassper Nyovest
- DJ Zinhle and Pearl Thusi
- Dr. Rebecca Malope
- Vusi Nova and Ringo Madlingozi
- Jub Jub
- Pearl Modiadie
- Minnie Dlamini
- Moshe Ndiki

== Controversies ==
=== Intellectual property ===
In September 2020, political commentator and author Eusebius McKaiser made public email records showing that aspiring producer Hastings Moeng had pitched the exact concept under the title "Dinner Kwa Somizi" back in July 2014. The emails sent by Moeng to Somizi in 2014, and later to Legeng Manqele in September 2016, detailed the concept of a show where Somizi cooked alongside celebrity guests while interviewing them. Somizi denied opening the emails.

Moeng send legal letters of demand and issued a high court summons against Somizi, BarLeader TV and MultiChoice, demaning public recognistion as the show's creator, an apology and financial compensation in a form of royalties.
