= Imbewu: The Seed =

South African drama series

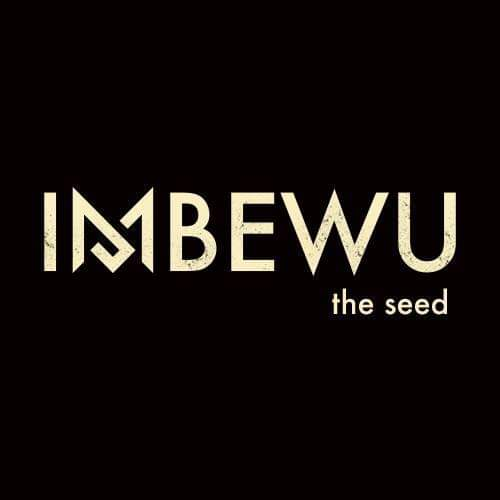
- Created by: Duma Ndlovu
- Story by: Carol Shore
- Starring: Leleti Khumalo; Thembi Mtshali; Tony Kgoroge; Lusanda Mbane; Sandile Dlamini; Raphael Griffiths; Nokubonga Khuzwayo; Kay Sibiya; Nqobile Ndlovu; Jailoshini Naidoo; Kajal Maharaj; Vuyokazi Tshona; Phindile Gwala; Vuyiseka Cawe; Busisiwe Shezi; Anathi Gobeni; Nduduzo Zuma; Kaylin Soobraminia; Mandisa Vilakazi; Sindisiwe Zondo; Sinenhlanhla Sabela; Zamaswazi Mokoena; Thando Gcwensa; Ntokozo Mzulwini; Langalakhe Zwane; Jack Devnarain
- Country of origin: South Africa
- Original languages: English; Zulu
- No. of seasons: 5
- No. of episodes: 1305

Original release
- Network: e.tv eVOD
- Release: 16 April 2018 – 14 April 2023

Imbewu: The Seed is a South African television drama series created by Duma Ndlovu, who also served as executive producer alongside Anant Singh and Leleti Khumalo. It is an e.tv original series produced by Grapevine Productions, a co-production between Word of Mouth Productions, Videovision Entertainment and Luyks Productions, commissioned and distributed by e.tv. Leleti Khumalo also starred in the series, alongside Tony Kgoroge, Thembi Mtshali-Jones, Raphael Griffiths, Jailoshini Naidoo and Koobeshen Naidoo, amongst others.

== Premise ==
The series revolves around, Zimele "Ngcolosi" Bhengu (Tony Kgoroge), alternating between two main plots. One is that he, along with two business partners, Pranav Rampersad (Koobeshen Naidoo), and Zane Johnson; have built Maluju Oil; an oil company worth a hundred million rand, driven by his ambition to be the first black South African black oil baron. Now in his forties, Ngcolosi is set on leaving a lasting legacy for his children. Knowing that neither of his partners are willing to relinquish their equity that they've helped build for years, Ngcolosi is dead set on doing whatever it takes.

The other, crucial central part revolves around the Bhengu family. Ngcolosi is married to, Nokubonga "MaZulu" Bhengu (Leleti Khumalo). Ngcolosi had mentioned the issue of bearing children. Mazulu, who hadn't given birth to any children and under pressure, sought medical help, and found that Ngcolosi was in fact, impotent. Rather than talk to Ngcolosi about the issue, she seeks guidance from her mother-in-law and family matriarch MaNdlovu (Thembi Mtshali Jones), who decides on a traditional solution where Ngcolosi's brother Phakade (Sandile Dlamini) must don the responsibility of impregnating her. The custom dictates that Ngcolosi bears full paternal rights to the children, and by extension, forbids Ngcolosi from ever knowing that such a ritual was practiced. When he finds out that all four of his children are not biologically his, it sets in motion family tensions between them.

== Cast ==
- Tony Kgoroge as Zimele 'Ngcolosi' Bhengu
- Thembi Mtshali-Jones as MaNdlovu Bhengu
- Leleti Khumalo as Nokubonga 'MaZulu' Bhengu
- Sandile Dlamini as Phakade "Shongololo" Bhengu.
- Nqobile Ndlovu as Nokukhanya "Khanyo" Bhengu
- Kay Sibiya as Nkululeko Bhengu,
- Nokubonga Khuzwayo as Zakithi Bhengu
- Raphael Griffiths as Zithulele Bhengu
- Wanda Zuma as Mthunzi
- Jailoshini Naidoo as Nirupa Rampersad
- Kajal Maharaj as Shria Rampersad
- Jack Devnarain as Sunil Maharaj
- Lusanda Mbane as Makhosazane Langa

== Production ==
Filming took place in a studio in Congela, as well as Chatsworth, Mbumbulu, Umlazi, and other surrounding areas in Durban, Kwazulu Natal

In March 2020, production for the series was paused due to the COVID-19 pandemic and the instated lockdown. Marlon Davids, managing director of e.tv had stated to the public that production companies of all e.tv series, including Imbewu, would be temporarily shut down. Despite this, pre-filmed episodes of the series continued to air uninterrupted throughout the lockdown period.

In January 2023, it was announced that season 5 would be the finale of the series. Though no reason was given by e.tv for its choice not to renew the series, the station reiterated that they were committed to investing in local content.

=== Casting ===
The cast was officially announced in January 2018, with Mpumelelo Bulose, Thembi Mtshali and Leleti Khumalo announced as the lead cast. It was later announced that Mpumelelo Bulose would be leave due to his conduct. Tony Kgoroge took on his role, making his on-screen debut on 14 September 2018. Throughout the series, the production experienced an exodus of actors, most reported to be from contractual disputes.

== Broadcast ==
Imbewu premiered on 18 April 2018, with new episodes shown first on e.tv, and later on eExtra. Later on, the series was added to the PCCW Global streaming service Viu, through an exclusive streaming deal. e.tv briefly added the series to its streaming service eVOD, before being forced to take it down, as it was a contractual breach. Viu sued e.tv R38 million for the breach. The series was later added again on eVOD and subsequently removed from Viu.

=== International broadcast ===
The series has been aired in 25 francophone-speaking countries, dubbed in French as Imbewu: Le Fruit du Mensonge (lit. The Fruit of The Lie), through Canal+ and A+.

Series Overview :

Season 1 : 16 April 2018 - 12 April 2019

Season 2 : 15 April 2019 - 10 April 2020

Season 3 : 13 April 2020 - 09 April 2021

Season 4 : 12 April 2021 - 08 April 2022

Season 5 : 11 April 2022 - 14 April 2023

== Awards and nominations ==
Year	Award	Category	Nominee	Result
2019	South African Film and Television Awards	Audience Award - Most Popular TV Soap	Imbewu: The Seed	Nominated
2019	South African Film and Television Awards	Best Achievement in Cinematography – TV Soap	Marc Brower	Nominated
2020	South African Film and Television Awards	Audience Award - Most Popular TV Soap	Imbewu: The Seed	Won
2020	South African Film and Television Awards	Best Actress – Telenovela	Leleti Khumalo	Nominated
2020	South African Film and Television Awards	Best Achievement in Make-up and Hairstyling – TV Soap/Telenovela	Imbewu: The Seed	Nominated
