= Olympus on My Mind =

- Poster for the off-Broadway production
- Music: Grant Sturiale
- Lyrics: Barry Harman
- Book: Barry Harman
- Basis: play by Heinrich Von Kleist; Amphitryon
- Productions: 1986 Off Broadway; 1988 Fairfield, Connecticut

Olympus On My Mind is a musical with music by Grant Sturiale and a book and lyrics by Barry Harman, based on Heinrich Von Kleist's adaptation of Plautus' Amphitryon. The musical ran Off-Broadway at Lamb's Theatre for 297 performances in 1986. It was also staged that year in a regional production in Fairfield, Connecticut by the Boston Post Road Stage Company.

== Synopsis ==
The show is set in Thebes in Ancient Greece ("Welcome to Greece"). Jupiter is bored with life on Mount Olympus and decides to have an affair with a mortal woman, which turns out to be the beneficent Princess Alcmene. However, she is happily married to General Amphitryon, who is away fighting battles. Jupiter concocts a plan to disguise himself as the General, but when Alcmene first meets the new general she is apprehensive. Jupiter wins her over with a depiction of the enchanted evening that awaits her ("Heaven on Earth").

Mercury, Jupiter's son, has accompanied him to Earth, but he turns out to be useless when Jupiter wants to know the result of the battle with Sparta. Dolores, a member of the chorus, is left to find out ("Gods on Tap").

Sosia, one of the General's slaves, arrives back home, happy to be alive after the years he spent fighting in the wars. Mercury, however, has assumed his identity, so he is not welcome ("Surprise!"). Sosia leaves just as Jupiter comes out from the palace, after his night with the Princess. Due to the fact this was Jupiter's first time as a human, he starts to feel human emotions ("Love - What a Concept"). Anxiety fills him, wondering if Alcmene loves him. He asks her, but he is disappointed to learn she has spent the night with a charlatan. Mercury advises his father to give the Princess time, and eventually she will be cognizant of the truth ("Wait 'Til it Dawns").

The General is looking forward to reuniting with his wife ("Enter the Husband/I Know My Wife"). En route home, he encounters Sosia, who tells him he was barred from the house by, none other than the imposter General ("It Was Me"). Once at home, the general is perturbed by his wife's unfeeling greeting ("Back So Soon"). He is astounded to learn she spent an enchanted, passionate reunion the night before, which she describes in glowing detail ("Wonderful"). Angered, the General accuses the Princess of adultery. He storms out, while his wife is crying and still claiming innocence. Sosia too is reuniting with his wife nagging wife, Charis. He too is astounded by his wife's actions, when he discovers her going out for a night on the town ("At Liberty in Thebes"). She contends that he gave her permission (it was actually Mercury in disguise). Thinking it over, she contemplates if the man last night was an impostor.

Still disguised as the General, Jupiter verifies her beliefs but says she should not be held responsible. He persuades her that there is only one way she could have been misled ("Jupiter Slept Here"). She is comforted to be pardoned from blame, but she furious to be deceived by Jupiter. Mercury suggests ways to win women's hearts after Jupiter becomes disheartened since he feels he can win the Princess' affection again ("Something of Yourself"). Jupiter attempts to gain sympathy by telling her how lonely he is on the Mountain, but he is still disguised as the General ("Olympus is a Lonely Town").

Alcmene forgives Jupiter because she has been so moved, and Jupiter is ecstatic. But, Jupiter then encounters another human emotion: Jealousy. He then feels he cannot leave her on Earth with her real husband. To take her, he plans to make her into a constellation, so that way he can be with her forever in heaven, despite the objections by Mercury. Dolores uses this plot point as an excuse for a large production number with her as the featured performer ("A Star is Born").

Alcmene is then faced with a problem: The General comes back and she is confused by two identical husbands. She is then pitted to choose one, and chooses Jupiter, thinking that is her actual husband. The General objects, but in turn doing so, he realizes he is condemning his wife as a willing debauchee. He takes back his plea and declares he will defend her purity of heart till death. Jupiter has yet another new emotion: compassion ("Mine Eyes Have Seen"). Jupiter then leaves Alcmene, abjures from the challenge to mend harmony on Earth. He returns to the Heavens, re-assuming his role as Eternal Ruler of The Universe, albeit dolefully ("Heaven on Earth (Reprise)").

The show is first and foremost a Comedy, and uses (and abuses) a few inside jokes. The first: The Show is produced (allegedly) by "Murray the Furrier", a fictitious furrier who deals in used and discount furs. Included in the actual contract to produce the show are stipulations that credit be given to Murray the Furrier in all advertising media and program books.

Second: The character Delores, a chorus girl with only one line, has no business being on stage. It is obvious that she has been cast as a favor to Murray the Furrier, who is revealed to be her sugar daddy. She has only one "scripted" line, but that doesn't stop her from having an ongoing conversation with the audience throughout. She speaks directly to the audience. When it comes time for her one scripted line, she flubs it. Third: the show lends itself to the style of a comedy routine from the 1950s (reminiscent of The Dick Van Dyke Show). The chorus (Tom, Dick, Horace and Delores) are stylized characters who tap dance in sandals. The leads are encouraged to be played broadly. It come off as light fun.

== Musical Numbers ==
- 'Welcome To Greece' - Chorus
- 'Heaven On Earth' - Jupiter, Alcmen, Chorus
- 'The Gods On Tap' - Delores, Jupiter, Mercury, Chorus
- 'Surprise!' - Sosia
- 'Love, What a Concept' - Jupiter, Mercury
- 'Wait 'til Dawn' - Mercury
- 'I Know My Wife' - Amphitryon
- 'It Was Me' - Sosia
- 'Back So Soon?' - Amphitryon, Sosia, Chorus
- 'Wonderful' - Alcmene
- 'At Liberty In Thebes' - Charis, Chorus
- 'Jupiter Slept Here' - Company
- 'Back to the Play' - Chorus
- 'Don't Bring Her Flowers' - Mercury
- 'Generals' Pandemonium' - Amphitryon, Jupiter, Sosia, Chorus
- 'Heaven on Earth (reprise)' - Sosia, Chorus
- 'A Star Is Born' - Delores, Company
- 'Olympus Is A Lonely Town' - Amphitryon, Alcmene, Mercury, Jupiter, Charis, Sosia, Chorus
- 'Finale - Heaven on Earth' - Jupiter, Alcmene
