= Thembi Mtshali-Jones =

South African actress and Singer

- Born: Thembi Mtshali; 7 November 1949 (age 76); Vrede, Free State
- Occupations: Actress, singer, playwright, teacher
- Years active: 1970–present
- Spouse: Emrys Jones (1999–2016)
- Children: Phumzile
- Awards: Kentucky Colonel

Thembi Mtshali-Jones (born 7 November 1949) is a South African actress. Considered as one of South Africa's most celebrated artists, Thembi is notable for the roles in the several popular television serials including 'Sgudi S'naysi, Stokvel, Silent Witness and Imbewu. Apart from acting, she is also a renowned singer, playwright and Associate Teaching Artist at Global Arts Corps in Kosovo as well as a trainer in Cambodia.

== Personal life ==
She was born on 7 November in Sabhoza, a village near Ulundi, Durban, South Africa. Her parents divorced soon after her birth. She later grew up in KwaMashu Township where she completed her education. During school times, she got pregnant and therefore forced to leave school.

In 1998, she had a residency at the Gallaudet University in Washington DC, USA and later at the University of Louisville, USA in 2004. With the contribution to the field of art, she was made an Honorary Citizen of Louisville by the Mayor and received a vote of thanks by the Kentucky Senate. Later the Governor of Kentucky gave her the title Honorary Kentucky Colonel, highest honor in Kentucky.

She has one daughter, Phumzile from her first marriage which ended with a divorce. Later, she was married to Emrys Jones, who was 10 years younger than Thembi. She met Emrys, when he came to watch Thembi's one woman show A Woman in Waiting. They had eight months affair and finally got married. Emrys worked as a business analyst for a London-based oil company. They lived together for 17 years, until he died in 2016 following a heart attack.

== Career ==
Her acting talent was discovered by Welcome Msomi where Thembi performed in his original Umabatha. She then joined the 'Musical Ipi Tombi', and became the lead female as 'Mama Tembu'. She made several international tours including the West End and Broadway. Later she went USA for uplift her musical career where she met popular musicians Hugh Masekela and Miriam Makeba. They toured Europe and Africa for several years. In 1987, Thembi returned South Africa and joined the Market Theatre. At the theater, she got the opportunity to work with Janice Honeyman in Black And White Follies.

Since 1970s, she performed in stage for number of plays. With Gcina Mhlophe and Maralin Vanrenen, she co–wrote and performed the stage play Have You Seen Zandile. She won a Fringe First at the Edinburgh Festival Fringe for her role in that play. With that success, she then co–wrote the play Eden and Other Places and Women of Africa with Barney Simon. Meanwhile, she toured UK and USA with the Malcom Purkey's musical 'Marabi'. In 1998, she got the privilege to sing “Happy Birthday” song for then-president Nelson Mandela on his 80th birthday in Washington DC. The song was broadcast live on CNN.

However, she became popular with the 1986 television sitcom Sgudi 'Snaysi with the role 'Thoko'. In 1988, she made her maiden cinema appearance as the female lead in Mapantsula. The film awarded as the Best New Film at the Cannes Film Festival in that year. In 1999, she co-wrote the one-woman play A Woman in Waiting. The play was based on Thambi's real life and it was played at Joseph Paps Theatre in New York. The play later won the Fringe First at Edinburgh Festival. In 2001, the play was played in New Ambassador Theatre, London and later in South Africa, Tunisia, Canada, the US and Bermuda Island. In 1999, Thembi won Best Actress Award at The Carthage Festival in Tunisia. She later made a radio version of the play for BBC 4, and won Sony Gold Award in 2002.

In 2002, she joined with the television sitcom Stokvel with the role 'Hazel'. She was later nominated for International Emmy Award in 2004 for this role. In 2002, she was nominated in the category of African Excellence in Entertainment & Arts at Tribute Achievers Awards Ceremony. In 2006, Thembi joined with the international production Truth In Translation directed by an American director Michael Lessac. The play was opened in Rwanda and has later performed in the US, Europe and Africa as well as at Baxter Theatre Centre in 2007. In 2009, she received Lifetime Achievement Award of City of Durban and the KwaZulu-Natal Province. She then received Lifetime award from Arts and Culture Trust in 2015.

In November 2019, Thembi was honored with The Living Legend Award at National Black Theatre Festival in North Carolina, USA to distinguish her service to South African cinema. In the same year, she starred in the critically acclaimed production Mother to Mother at National Black Theater Festival. The play was based on a novel by Sindiwe Magona. Magona later wrote the biographical book 'Theatre Road: My Story is an inspiring account of Thembi Mtshali-Jones', which was released to coincide with Mtshali-Jones' 70th birthday.

== Filmography ==
Year	Film	Role	Genre	Ref.
1986	Sgudi 'Snaysi	Thoko	TV series	
1988	Mapantsula	Pat	Film	
2002	Stokvel	Hazel	TV series	
2003	The Wooden Camera	Madiba's Mother	Film	
2004	In My Country	Lizzie	Film	
2004	Cape of Good Hope	Ms. Silemeni	Film	
2010	Silent Witness	Zali Silongo	TV series	
2010	Themba	Sister Princess	Film	
2011	Buschpiloten küsst man nicht	N'Nanga	TV movie	
2012	Copposites	Constance Ralapele	Film	
2013	Weit hinter dem Horizont	Desi	TV movie	
2014	Konfetti	Lerato Cwele	Film	
2015	While You Weren't Looking	Shado's Gogo	Film	
2015	Bleeding Gospel	Theresa	Short film	
2018	Imbewu	MaNdlovu Bhengu	TV series	
2019	Mother to Mother	Mother	Film	
