= Tony Kgoroge =

South African actor

- Born: 21 April 1974 (age 52); Bloemfontein, Orange Free State, South Africa
- Occupation: Actor
- Known for: Invictus
- Notable work: Blood Diamond
- Spouse: Sthandiwe Kgoroge (m. 2002)
- Children: 3

Tony Kgoroge (born 21 April 1974) is a South African actor. He is best known for his performance as Jason Tshabalala in Invictus.

He also stars as Zimele "Ngcolosi" Bhengu on e.tv's soap, Imbewu: The Seed.

== Personal life ==
He is married to actress Sthandiwe Kgoroge and they have children. When faced with debt recovery in 2018, he asked that people ignore his and his wife's Instagram pages. They were only "ordinary people". He was facing loss of earnings because he was not being paid for repeat fees by some broadcasters.

== Selected filmography ==
Film
Year	Title	Role	Notes
2000	Hijack Stories	Sox Moraka	Crime / Drama
2004	Hotel Rwanda	Gregoire	Biography / Drama / History
2005	Lord of War	Mbizi	True Crime / Drama
2006	Blood Diamond	the Liberian army officer	Adventure / Drama / Thriller
2007	The Bird Can’t Fly	Scoop	Drama
2008	Skin	Petrus Zwane	Biography / Drama
2009	Invictus	Jason Tshabalala	Biography / Drama / History
2010	The First Grader	Charles Obinchu	Biography / Drama / Romance
2013	Mandela: Long Walk to Freedom	Walter Sisulu	Biography / Drama / History
2018 - 2020; 2022–Present	Imbewu: The Seed	Zimele Bhengu	TV Series 274 episodes
2022–Present	Recipes for Love and Murder	Khaya Meyer	TV Series 10 episodes
2024	Savage Beauty	Richard Moloto	TV Series 6 episodes
2026	Umthetho	Moses Dlamini	Main role, 7 episodes
