= AmaNdiya =

2001 Zulu-language song by Mbongeni Ngema

Song by Mbongeni Ngema
- Language: Zulu
- Released: 2001
- Genre: Protest song
- Songwriter: Mbongeni Ngema
- Composer: Mbongeni Ngema
- Lyricist: Mbongeni Ngema

AmaNdiya is a 2001 Zulu language song by South African musician Mbongeni Ngema. The song is controversial for accusing South Africa's Indian community of racism and exploitation of black South Africans. It has been accused of being racially derogatory towards the Indian community and promoting anti-Indian sentiment.

On 27 December 2001 the Broadcasting Complaints Commission of South Africa (BCCSA) banned the song from Ukhozi FM after the South African Human Rights Commission filed a complaint. BCCSA chairperson ruled the song constituted hate speech for making "sweeping generalisations" accusing Indians of oppressing and dispossessing Zulus. Former South African president, Nelson Mandela, called on Ngema to apologise "if he has offended anyone with racist lyrics." A motion in the South African parliament was proposed condemning the song and the Anglican bishop of KwaZulu-Natal stated that the song should be banned.

The Mail & Guardian compared the song to Simon Bikindi's anti-Tutsi song released just before the Rwandan genocide. The public reaction to the song has been compared to the controversial Apartheid era song Dubul' ibhunu (Kill the Boer).

Ngema rejected calls to apologise for the song and defended his lyrics, saying they reflect the views of many black South Africans.

Especially controversial lyrics of the song, translated into English, included:

"Indians don't want to change, even Mandela has failed to convince them. It was better with whites we knew then it was a racial conflict";

"...we struggle so much here in Durban, as we have been dispossessed by Indians";

"I have never seen Dlamini [a common Zulu name] emigrating to Bombay, India. Yet, Indians, arrive everyday in Durban - they are packing the airport full".
