= Little One (2012 film) =

2012 film

- Directed by: Darrell Roodt
- Written by: Darrell Roodt
- Starring: Lindiwe Ndlovu
- Cinematography: Trevor Brown
- Edited by: Avril Beukes
- Music by: Laurent Eyquem
- Release date: 2012
- Country: South Africa
- Language: Zulu

Little One is a 2012 South African drama film directed by Darrell Roodt. The film was selected as the South African entry for the Best Foreign Language Oscar at the 85th Academy Awards, but it did not make the final shortlist.

== Plot ==
Set in South Africa, the story follows a middle aged woman named Pauline, who finds a battered child on the road. She takes the child to the hospital where she is treated. Then she takes the child away to find out why the child became a victim of violence.

== Cast ==
- Lindiwe Ndlovu as Pauline
- Vuyelwa Msimang as Little One (Vuyelwa)
- Mutodi Neshehe as Detective Morena
- Nompumelelo Nyiyane as Nurse
- Luzuko Nqeto as Jacob
- Vicky Kente as Florence
- Vusi Msimang as Vusi
- Richard Lukunku as Detective # 2
- Tami Baleka as Matron
- Sarah Kozlowski as Social Worker
- Jonathan Taylor as Doctor
- Samela Tyelbooi as ICU Nurse

== See also ==
- List of submissions to the 85th Academy Awards for Best Foreign Language Film
- List of South African submissions for the Academy Award for Best Foreign Language Film
