= Mary Twala =

South African actress (1939–2020)

Mary Twala-Mhlongo
- Born: Mary Kuksie Twala; 14 September 1939; Soweto, Johannesburg, Union of South Africa
- Died: 4 July 2020 (aged 80); Parklane Private Hospital, Johannesburg, South Africa
- Other name: Mampinga
- Occupation: Actress
- Years active: 1960s – 2020
- Notable work: Hlala Kwabafileyo, Molo Fish, Ubizo: The Calling, Yizo-Yizo
- Spouse: Ndaba Mhlongo (deceased)
- Family: Somizi Mhlongo (son); Archie Mhlongo (son, deceased); Bahumi Madisakwane (granddaughter)

Mary Kuksie Twala OIS (14 September 1939 – 4 July 2020) was a South African actress. In 2011, she was nominated for Africa Movie Academy Award for Best Actress in a Supporting Role.

== Career ==
Twala featured in several South African local productions. She had a guest role in the first season of Generations. In 2007, she starred in local drama, Ubizo: The Calling. In 2010, she played a supporting role in Hopeville, the film won numerous awards in several festivals and award ceremonies. Twala played "Ma Dolly" in the film, which earned her a Best Supporting Actress nomination in the 6th Africa Movie Academy Awards. After undergoing a medical procedure that kept her out of filming for months, Twala made a comeback in Vaya in 2015.

In 2016, she was one of the ensemble cast in Comatose, a film that featured top acts across Africa including Bimbo Akintola and Hakeem Kae-Kazim. In 2017, she played a supporting role in the sport film, Beyond the River. By October 2017, it was announced that Twala would feature in a new television drama series on Mzansi Magic, The Imposter.

== Selected filmography ==
- Mapantsula (1988) as Woman in Crowd
- Sarafina! (1992) as Sarafina's Grandmother
- Beat the Drum (2003) as Ntomi
- Ghost Son (2007) as Leleti
- Life, Above All (2010) as Mrs. Gulubane
- Leading Lady (2014) as Sarah Novuka
- Hopeville (2009 TV Series) as Ma Dolly
- State of Violence (2010) as Sophie
- This Is Not a Burial, It's a Resurrection (2019) as Mantoa
- Black Is King (2020)

== Personal life ==
Twala was born 14 September 1939 in Soweto Johannesburg. She was married to actor Ndaba Mhlongo until his death in 1989. They were the parents of Somizi Mhlongo and Archie Mhlongo (deceased 1985).

== Death ==
Twala died on July 4, 2020, at around 11 am at Parklane private hospital, Johannesburg. She was laid to rest on July 9, 2020, in Soweto. Due to COVID-19 regulations, her funeral could be attended by no more than 50 people.
