= Close Harmony (1981 film) =

1981 film

- Directed by: Nigel Noble
- Produced by: Nigel Noble
- Cinematography: Steve Gerbson; Tom Houghton
- Edited by: Emma Joan Morris
- Distributed by: Learning Company of America
- Release date: 1981
- Running time: 30 minutes
- Country: United States
- Language: English

Close Harmony is a 1981 American short documentary film directed by Nigel Noble. The film chronicles how a children's choir of 4th- and 5th-graders at the Brooklyn Friends School and elderly retirees at a Brooklyn Jewish seniors' center combine to give an annual joint concert.

== Reception ==
Writing in The New York Times, John J. O'Connor called Close Harmony "the kind of production that whizzes by dazzlingly, leaving the audience drenched in smiles and tears and hoping for just a bit more".

== Awards ==
Close Harmony won the Academy Award for Best Documentary (Short Subject) at the 54th Academy Awards. After airing on PBS, Close Harmony was nominated for a News & Documentary Emmy Awards for Outstanding Informational Cultural or Historical Programming at the 3rd News & Documentary Emmy Awards.
