= Romance/Romance =

1987 musical

- Original Recording
- Music: Keith Herrmann
- Lyrics: Barry Harman
- Book: Barry Harman
- Basis: Jules Renard's play Le pain de ménage
- Productions: 1987 Off-off-Broadway; 1988 Broadway

Romance/Romance is a musical with a book and lyrics by Barry Harman and music by Keith Herrmann.

== Synopsis ==
The show is composed of two acts linked only by the common theme of love and one song performed in both acts. The first, The Little Comedy, is based on a short story by Arthur Schnitzler and explores the budding relationship between two people who have adopted personas other than their own. Set in late 19th century Vienna, it focuses on Josefine, a demimondaine weary of the social life provided by her upper class lovers, and wealthy playboy Alfred, who has tired of a seemingly endless round of inconsequential affairs. She assumes the guise of a working class woman, while he pretends to be a struggling poet, and the two meet while enjoying their new identities. Whether or not they can survive a weekend in the country with their usually glamorous trappings replaced by inedible food, bad wine, swarming insects, and total boredom is the question to be answered.

Summer Share, the second act based on Jules Renard's 1898 play Le pain de ménage, is updated to the late 1980s and set in The Hamptons, where two married couples in their thirties are spending the season in a rented cottage. Sam, who is married to Barb, and Monica, who is married to Lenny, find themselves gradually progressing from harmless flirtation to the serious possibility of an illicit affair.

== Original cast and characters ==
Character	Broadway (1988)
Monica / Josefine Weninger	Alison Fraser
Sam / Alfred Von Wilmers	Scott Bakula
Barb / Her	Deborah Graham
Lenny / Him	Robert Hoshour

== Songs ==
Act I

- The Little Comedy
- Goodbye, Emil
- It's Not Too Late
- Great News
- Oh, What a Performance!
- I'll Always Remember the Song
- Happy, Happy, Happy
- Women of Vienna
- Yes, It's Love
- A Rustic Country Inn
- The Night It Had to End
- The Little Comedy (Finale)

Act II

- Summer Share
- Think of the Odds
- It's Not Too Late (Reprise)
- Plans A & B
- Let's Not Talk About It
- So Glad I Married Her
- Small Craft Warnings
- How Did I End Up Here?
- Words He Doesn't Say
- My Love for You
- Moonlight Passing Through a Window
- Now
- Romantic Notions
- Romance, Romance

An original cast recording was released by MCA.

== Production history ==
Initially staged off-off-Broadway November 16, 1987 at the Actor's Outlet Theatre (Executive Director: Eleanor Segan, Artistic Director: Ken Lowstetter), Romance/Romance garnered critical notices that encouraged the move to a larger house uptown. After thirteen previews, the Broadway production, directed by Harman and choreographed by Pamela Sousa, opened on May 1, 1988 at the Helen Hayes Theatre, where it ran for 297 performances. The cast included Alison Fraser as Josefine/Monica, Scott Bakula as Alfred/Sam, Deborah Graham as Barb, and Robert Hoshour as Lenny. Sal Viviano was the Standby for Bakula and Hoshour, and succeeded Bakula, when he left the Show. Jana Robbins was the Standby for Fraser and Graham. Barry Williams replaced Viviano later in the run.

== Awards and nominations ==
=== Original Broadway production ===
Year	Award	Category	Nominee	Result
1988	Tony Award	Best Musical		Nominated
1988	Tony Award	Best Book of a Musical	Barry Harman	Nominated
1988	Tony Award	Best Original Score	Barry Harman and Keith Herrmann	Nominated
1988	Tony Award	Best Performance by a Leading Actor in a Musical	Scott Bakula	Nominated
1988	Tony Award	Best Performance by a Leading Actress in a Musical	Alison Fraser	Nominated
1988	Drama Desk Award	Outstanding Lyrics	Barry Harman	Nominated
