= Anant Prasad Singh =

Indian politician (died 2019)

MLA of Mirganj
- In office 1969–1977
- Preceded by: S. B. Saran
- Succeeded by: Bhavesh Chandra Prasasd

Personal details
- Born: 1926/27
- Died: 27 January 2019 (aged 92)
- Party: Indian National Congress

Anant Prasad Singh was an Indian politician belonging to Indian National Congress. He was elected as a member of Bihar Legislative Assembly from Mirganj in 1969 and 1972. He died on 27 January 2019 at the age of 92.
