= Aaron Kopp =

- Citizenship: United States
- Occupation: Film director
- Known for: Saving Face, The Hunting Ground,

Aaron Kopp is a US-based cinematographer and film director who grew up in Eswatini.

== Life ==
Kopp shot and co-produced Saving Face (2012), the Oscar-winning documentary about acid attacks in Pakistan. He and his partner Amanda Kopp shot for The Hunting Ground (2015), about sexual assault on American college campuses.

Aaron and Amanda Kopp's 2017 movie Liyana, eight years in the making, is a mix of documentary and animated fable. A 'story within a story', about a young girl rescuing her twin brothers from kidnappers, emerges from a storytelling workshop in Likhaya Lemphilo Lensha (New Life Homes) orphanage in Kamfishane, Shiselweni Region. Liyana is executive-produced by Thandiwe Newton, who heard about the project through filmmaker Sharmeen Obaid-Chinoy.

== Filmography ==
=== As director ===
- Likhaya, 2009
- Liyana, 2017

=== As cinematographer ===
- Her Life is My Teacher, 2008
- Begin, 2009
- Del:100, 2010
- Arise, 2012
- Living on the Edge of Disaster: Climate's Human Cost, 2014
- The Hunting Ground, 2015
- Dime Short, 2017
- Turns in the Road, 2018

=== As cinematographer and producer ===
- Saving Face, 2012

=== As producer ===
- Anuja (2024)
