= Sarafina! (film) =

1992 South African film

- Theatrical release poster
- Directed by: Darrell James Roodt
- Screenplay by: William Nicholson; Mbongeni Ngema
- Based on: Sarafina! by: Mbongeni Ngema; Hugh Masekela
- Produced by: Anant Singh
- Starring: Whoopi Goldberg; Miriam Makeba; John Kani; Mbongeni Ngema; Leleti Khumalo
- Cinematography: Mark Vicente
- Edited by: Peter Hollywood; Sarah Thomas
- Music by: Mbongeni Ngema (songs); Hugh Masekela (songs); Stanley Myers (score)
- Production companies: Hollywood Pictures; Miramax Films; Distant Horizon; BBC
- Distributed by: Buena Vista Pictures Distribution (United States) (Note: Since the acquisition of Miramax by ViacomCBS (now known as Paramount Global) on April 3, 2020, Paramount Pictures owns the US rights to the film.); Ariane Distribution (France); Warner Bros. (United Kingdom)
- Release dates: 11 May 1992 (Cannes); 18 September 1992 (US); 9 October 1992 (South Africa); 15 January 1993 (UK); 3 March 1993 (France)
- Running time: 98 minutes
- Countries: United States; South Africa; United Kingdom; France
- Language: English
- Box office: $8.6 million (South Africa/US)

Sarafina! is a 1992 musical drama film based on Mbongeni Ngema's 1987 musical of the same name. The film was directed by Darrell Roodt and written by Ngema Mbongeni and William Nicholson, and stars Leleti Khumalo, Miriam Makeba, John Kani, Ngema, and Whoopi Goldberg; Khumalo reprises her role from the stage performance.

An international co-production of South Africa, the United States, France, and the United Kingdom, the film premiered on 11 May 1992, at the Cannes Film Festival.

== Plot ==
Sarafina is a teenaged school student living in Soweto within the racially persecuting Republic of South Africa who idolizes Nelson Mandela, who is currently serving life imprisonment for conspiracy and treason against the country's racial segregation system: the apartheid. A school play is coming soon, and Sarafina wishes to play Mandela.

At school, a weary school principal assigns a history teacher named Mary Masombuka to lead prayer songs to deescalate racial violence happening all over the country. Meanwhile, the South African Police tries to convince the principal that the students are responsible for leading anti-government riots due to a number of schools burning to the ground and must be prosecuted for the good of the country, but the principal does not believe them. During lunch break, the school staff discusses with the police who is really behind this chain of incidents, with Mary speculating it was the fault of juvenile delinquency causing it (which the students are covering up to prevent getting themselves in trouble with the faculty).

During rehearsal for the school play, Sarafina gets an idea of its happy ending, in which Mandela is set free to lead people to a new South Africa. After school in the meantime, Sarafina's boyfriend Crocodile leads a gang of students to stop the heavy taxes set by the Boers but are forced to flee when the authorities arrive to start a police riot.

At a white residence where her mother works, Sarafina expresses her boredom with the authorized syllabus government officials required for the adults to teach their children, wishing instead to be free, which is something her activist father always wanted before he died a hero. Her mother, however, is often annoyed by her daughter's daydreaming, believing that dawdling is contrary to all blacks serving the white government without question. Meanwhile, an injured Crocodile is forced to retreat to Sarafina's house for treatment after being subjected to police brutality.

At Mary's house, Mary explains to Sarafina that her husband Joe rarely used his gun to defend their home if necessary.

The next day, Mary denies teaching children communism to the police while Sarafina and Crocodile shame their classmate Guitar for selling them out by telling his suspicion to Constable Sabela on them, forcing him to admit this is what officials truly want in exchange for his father's life as a spy to the government: to brutally discipline the weak with cruel and unusual punishments. Sadly, once word got out from Guitar, it isn't long before Mary is sent to prison under the suspicion of conspiracy against the apartheid in favor of a new teacher, who then proceeds to fictionalize the Moscow Fire of 1812 according to the authorized syllabus in order to forbid the students from committing arson. This disgusts the students over their new teacher's vision of the French invasion of Russia during the Napoleonic Wars, so they angrily expel him from the classroom. The police take notice of the new teacher's expulsion from the classroom, so they start firing warning shots to try to scatter the students back to class. Some students, including Crocodile, fall dead at the police's hands in the process.

At the fallen students' funeral, a priest warns of the same price everyone else will pay for their arrogant presumption of being the rightfully native population of South Africa. With those words from the priest, the Soweto uprising against the apartheid finally commences, but after the police turn them away with tear gas, they escalate into a race riot, where Sabela is burned alive one night after throwing Guitar out of his car once he has no use for him anymore, and then an armed rebellion, in which the students, armed with whatever heavy firearms they can get their hands on, build large barricades out of old furniture to protect their homeland from the incoming South African Defence Force. However, this armed rebellion ends after much urban warfare from both sides when the SADF preemptively bombs Soweto to prevent a full-blown civil war from breaking out nationwide and captures all the students who are still alive.

After the failed insurrection, a prison warden reveals to Sarafina that Mary jumped from the tenth floor while in custody. With approval of the warden, a series of physical and psychological torture on Sarafina and other students ultimately commences to try to force them into loving State President of South Africa Nico Diederichs in exchange for their release from prison under summary execution as traitors to the government if they don't change their rebellious ways. For the final phase of her torture, Sarafina, who is electroshocked. The other prisoners, who narrate their experiences of torture,

After Sarafina is released, she goes to visit her mother in Newtown and the 2 have a heart to heart where Sarafina acknowledges her role as a hero. She heads back home in Soweto. After a discussion about the venue for the school play with Guitar who says the concert was cancelled and school hall burnt down, Sarafina leads the cast of students as Mandela. This school play becomes such as smashing success that Mandela is then released from prison by the year 1990, as revealed in the closing title card (and then becomes the first President of South Africa four years later, bringing the country back to normal as it was before the apartheid).

== Cast ==
- Whoopi Goldberg as Mary
- Miriam Makeba as Angelina
- John Kani as School Principal
- Mbongeni Ngema as Sabela
- Leleti Khumalo as Sarafina
- Dumisani Dlamini as Crocodile
- Tertius Meintjes as Lieutenant Bloem
- Robert Whitehead as Interrogator
- Somizi Mhlongo as Fire
- Nhlanhla Ngema as Stimela
- Faca Khulu as Eddie
- James Mthoba as Sarafina's Uncle
- Greg Latter as Policeman
- Nicky Rebelo as Soldier

== Production ==
=== Filming ===
Producer Anant Singh acquired the film rights to the Broadway musical Sarafina! After no Hollywood studio was willing to finance it, Singh raised the funds himself, with the BBC and the French company Revcom being among the investors. By the time filming started, Nelson Mandela was freed and apartheid was abolished, though racial tensions were still high. Said director Darrell Roodt: “Though our project is still confrontational and angry, it’s told with more hope and a spirit of reconciliation.” At the 1991 Cannes Film Festival, Whoopi Goldberg was announced to play Mary Masombuka; she was reportedly the first Black American actress to film a project in South Africa.

The film was shot on location at Morris Isaacson High School in Soweto, South Africa. Morris Isaacson was a centre of the 1976 Soweto student uprisings. Many of the extras and some of the cast members participated in the real-life resistance in Soweto, while Miriam Makeba was a political exile. Singh told the press that the film would be a different tackling of apartheid than other films about the subject, where they were told from a white perspective. "When people ask me why there is no good white in the movie," said Singh, "I tell them that this is one movie that isn’t about whites. Many of the actors have been arrested, had the police break down their doors in the middle of the night. Almost everyone had either first or second-hand experience with the movement. The kids in the cast were performing what they lived.” Given the racism that was still prevalent in South Africa post-apartheid, there were concerns that the filming of scenes showing protests and rioting would fan the flames. To avert this, the prop military vehicles were emblazoned with the insignia "Sarafina!" to assure the public that a movie was being filmed there.

In the United States, the film had some of the more graphic scenes removed to avoid a more restrictive rating. The MPAA rated the film PG-13 for "scenes of apartheid-driven violence;" the Director's Cut, which was released on LaserDisc in 1993, was rated R for "strong scenes of violence."

== Reception ==
=== Accolades ===
The film was screened out of competition at the 1992 Cannes Film Festival, where it was greeted with a standing ovation. Years later, Whoopi Goldberg mentioned on The Daily Show with Trevor Noah (who said the film was a hit in South Africa), that the ‘92 LA rebellion happened at the same time that Sarafina! was released which hampered the film's chance of success in the United States. The film holds a 60% score on Rotten Tomatoes.

=== Release ===
Miramax Films acquired the domestic rights to Sarafina! in February 1992 after seeing 40 minutes of footage; in turn, Miramax Films licensed those rights to Disney (with its subsidiary, Hollywood Pictures) after the film was screened at Cannes. The film was released on 18 September 1992. Sarafina! was re-released in South Africa on 16 June 2006 to commemorate the 30th anniversary of the Soweto uprising in Soweto. The re-mastered director's cut is not very different from the original, except for the inclusion of one scene that was cut from the original, between Leleti Khumalo (Sarafina) and Miriam Makeba (Sarafina's mother), which includes a musical number "Thank You Mama".

=== Box office ===
Sarafina! grossed $7,306,242 in the United States and Canada. It was the fourth-highest-grossing film in South Africa for the year with a gross of $1.33 million.
