= Darrell Roodt =

Film director

- Born: Darrell James Roodt; 28 April 1962 (age 64); Johannesburg, South Africa
- Citizenship: South African
- Occupations: Film director, screenwriter, producer
- Years active: 1985–present
- Known for: Sarafina!

Darrell James Roodt (born in Johannesburg, 28 April 1962) is a South African film director, screenwriter and producer. He is probably most well known for his 1992 film Sarafina! which starred actress Whoopi Goldberg. Roodt has worked with Patrick Swayze in Father Hood, James Earl Jones in Cry, the Beloved Country and Ice Cube in Dangerous Ground.

== Early life ==
Born in Johannesburg, South Africa, Darrell James Roodt grew up during the height of apartheid-era South Africa. His early films like Place of Weeping strongly condemned apartheid. Roodt was astounded that no one was addressing the conditions of apartheid through the medium of film, thus Place of Weeping is considered to be the first overtly anti-apartheid film made by a South African. Roodt is quoted as saying, "I didn’t do it from a leftist, agit-prop point of view, rather, I tried to explore characters caught up in quagmire of those turbulent times. Consequently I was never celebrated (for want of a better word) as a leftist film-maker."

== Awards and festivals ==
His film Sarafina! was screened out of competition at the 1992 Cannes Film Festival.

Roodt has won an EIUC Award at the Venice Film Festival (2004) and the Taormina Arte Award at the Taormina International Film Festival (2000)

His film Yesterday (2004) was nominated for the Academy Award for Best Foreign Language Film as well as the Independent Spirit Awards for Best Foreign Film (2005).

His 2007 film Meisie won best film at the Klein Karoo Nasionale Kuntsefees film festival in March 2008.

Roodt's 2012 film Little One was selected as the South African entry for the Best Foreign Language Oscar at the 85th Academy Awards, but this time it did not make the final shortlist.

== Filmography ==
=== As director ===
- City of Blood (1983)
- Place of Weeping (1986)
- The Stick (1987)
- Tenth of a Second (1987)
- Jobman (1990)
- Sarafina! (1992)
- Father Hood (1993)
- To the Death (1993)
- Cry, the Beloved Country (1995)
- Dangerous Ground (1997)
- Second Skin (2000)
- Witness to a Kill (2001)
- Pavement (2002)
- Sumuru (2003)
- Dracula 3000 (2004) TV film
- Yesterday (2004)
- "Dirty Laundry" (2005) episode of the TV series Charlie Jade
- Faith's Corner (2005)
- Cryptid (2006)
- Number 10 (2006)
- Lullaby (2008)
- Meisie (2007)
- Prey (2007)
- Ella Blue (2008) TV mini-series
- Zimbabwe (2008)
- Jakhalsdans (2010)
- Winnie Mandela (2011)
- Little One (2012))
- The Little Kings (2012)
- Stilte (2012))
- Room9 (TV Series) (2012)
- Little One (2013)
- Stealing Time (2013)
- Die Ballade Van Robbie de Wee (2013)
- Safari (2013)
- Snake Park TV Series (13 Episode) (2014)
- Alles Wat Mal Is (2014)
- Seun: 81457397BG (2014)
- Treurgrond (2015)
- Trouvoete (2015)
- Skorokoro (2016)
- Verskietende Ster (2016)
- Lake Placid: Legacy (2018)
- The Lullaby (2018)
- The Furnace (2019)
