= Anant Singh (film producer) =

South African poet, filmmaker, journalist and playwright

- Born: Anant Hareebrun Singh; 7 May 1956 (age 70); Durban, KwaZulu Natal, South Africa
- Education: University of Durban-Westville
- Occupations: Producer; member of the IOC
- Years active: 1986–present
- Notable work: Imbewu: The Seed; House of Zwide

Anant Hareebrun Singh (born May 29, 1956) is a South African film producer and a member of the International Olympic Committee (IOC).

== Education ==
Singh attended the University of Durban-Westville, in South Africa.

== Career ==
Singh is the CEO of Videovision Entertainment, and the producer of "Mandela: Long Walk to Freedom" which premiered in 2013 at the Toronto International Film Festival. Singh spent more than two decades on producing the film, in which he also interviewed Nelson Mandela while he was still imprisoned. The film took more than sixteen years to complete.

Singh is the chairman of Cape Town Film Studios and can be accredited for over 100 films.

== Filmography ==
=== Film ===
Year	Title	Director	Writer	Producer
1986	Place of Weeping	No	No	Yes
1989	Hellgate	No	No	Yes
1992	Sarafina!	No	No	Yes
1995	The Mangler	No	No	Yes
1995	Cry, the Beloved Country	No	No	Yes
2001	Mr Bones	No	No	Yes
2004	Yesterday	No	No	Yes
2008	Mr. Bones 2: Back from the Past	No	No	Yes
2013	Mandela: Long Walk to Freedom	No	No	Yes

=== Television ===
Title	Creator	Director	Writer	Executive Producer
Imbewu: The Seed	No	No	No	Yes
House of Zwide	No	No	No	Yes

== Sport ==
Singh entered the IOC in 2016, where he became Chair of the Communications Commission in 2018. He is also part of the Olympic Channel Commission since 2015, the Digital and Technology Commission since 2018, and the Coordination of the Games of the XXXIV Olympiad Los Angeles 2028 Commission since 2019.

Singh is the producer of the sports-themed films "The Long Run" and "More than Just a Game".

== Awards ==
- Peabody Awards (2005)
- Crystal Award at the World Economic Forum
- Golden Horn Award for Outstanding Contribution (2006)
- Honorary doctorate at the Durban University of Technology's Fred Crookes Sports Centre (2014)
- Honorary doctorates from the University of KwaZulu-Natal and the University of Port Elizabeth
- Doctorate in Technology (2017)
