= Cry, the Beloved Country (1995 film) =

- Theatrical release poster
- Directed by: Darrell Roodt
- Screenplay by: Ronald Harwood; Joshua Sinclair
- Based on: Cry, the Beloved Country by Alan Paton
- Produced by: Anant Singh; Harry Alan Towers
- Starring: James Earl Jones; Richard Harris; Charles S. Dutton
- Cinematography: Paul Gilpin
- Edited by: David Heitner
- Music by: John Barry
- Distributed by: Miramax Films
- Release date: 15 December 1995
- Running time: 106 minutes
- Countries: South Africa; United States
- Language: English
- Budget: $4 million
- Box office: $676,525 (US) (sub-total)

Cry, the Beloved Country is a 1995 South African drama film directed by Darrell Roodt, based on the novel Cry, the Beloved Country by Alan Paton. It stars James Earl Jones and Richard Harris.

The film was made in 1995, shortly after the fall of apartheid and the free election of Nelson Mandela as President of South Africa.

== Synopsis ==
Set in the Union of South Africa in October 1946, two years before the official implementation of apartheid, this is the story of church minister Stephen Kumalo (James Earl Jones) who is requested from his village to Johannesburg. There he discovers that his son Absalom has been arrested for the murder of a white man. Simultaneously, the white man's father, James Jarvis (Richard Harris), supports the pass laws. When Stephen and James meet, they eventually come to unexpected understandings about their sons and their own shared humanity.

== Selected cast ==
- James Earl Jones as Rev. Stephen Kumalo
- Richard Harris as James Jarvis
- Vusi Kunene as Rev. Theophilus Msimangu
- Charles S. Dutton as John Kumalo
- Dolly Rathebe as Mrs. Kumalo
- Eric Miyeni as Absolom Kumalo
- Ramolao Makhene as Mpanza
- Jack Robinson as Ian Jarvis
- Jennifer Steyn as Mary Jarvis
- Tsholofelo Wechoemang as Child
- Patrick Ndlovu as Man 1
- Darlington Michaels as Man 2
- King Twala as Man 3
- Robert Whitehead as Carmichael
- Graham Armitage as the Judge

Although this is a South African film, the majority of the main characters in the movie are played by Westerners, specifically Americans.

== Music ==
The score was composed by veteran English composer John Barry, who dedicated it to Nelson Mandela. It has been described by film score reviewer Christian Clemmensen of Filmtracks.com as "one of Barry's last truly enjoyable efforts." Barry, who had previously composed music for such African-themed films as Zulu (1964), Born Free (1966) and Out of Africa (1985), used predominantly western musical styles in the score, which references themes from Zulu, translating the original warlike compositions into a somber piano theme for travel scenes. The score was performed by the English Chamber Orchestra and recorded in Studio One at the EMI Abbey Road Studios, London.

The film also features the song "Exile" by Enya.

== Filming ==
The film was shot on location in KwaZulu Natal, Cape Province, and at Gauteng, South Africa.

== Reception ==
Cry, the Beloved Country received a mostly positive response from critics and holds an 85% "Fresh" rating from the review aggregator Rotten Tomatoes.

Online critic James Berardinelli gave the film four out of four stars, and described the performances of Harris and Jones as "superb," concluding "Rarely does a motion picture touch the heart so deeply, with no hint of artifice or manipulation." Stephen Holden of The New York Times also wrote favorably of the film, commenting "In a moment as transcendent as it is risky, the screen erupts with a volcanic emotion that cuts through the prevailing high-minded contemplation. Why risky? Because movies have become so invested in the unleashing of violent emotion and the escalation of hostility, that expressions of restraint, reconciliation and forgiveness can easily be read as corny cop-outs. Cry, the Beloved Country is not corny, and it doesn't cop out."

Conversely, Roger Ebert of the Chicago Sun-Times had a less positive view of the film, giving it only two and half out of four stars, and commenting, "The film has genuine qualities. Its photography and tone evoke a South Africa that is indeed beloved by its inhabitants ('If the climate and the landscape were not so beautiful, we would have had a revolution 50 years ago,' Paton is said to have observed). The performances by Jones and Harris have a quiet dignity, suitable to the characters if not reflecting a larger reality. But the film contains little that would have concerned the South African censors under apartheid. [...] Cry, the Beloved Country reflects a sentimentality that motivates many people, but it fails as a portrait of what it used to be like in South Africa, what happened and what it's like now."

== Awards and nominations ==
- NAACP Image Awards
  - Outstanding Motion Picture (Nominated)
  - Outstanding Actor in a Motion Picture: James Earl Jones (Nominated)
  - Outstanding Supporting Actor in a Motion Picture: Charles S. Dutton (Nominated)
- Screen Actors Guild Awards
  - Outstanding Performance by a Male Actor in a Leading Role (Nominated)
