= Sarafina! (musical) =

South African musical

- Music: Mbongeni Ngema; Hugh Masekela
- Lyrics: Mbongeni Ngema; Hugh Masekela
- Book: Mbongeni Ngema
- Basis: A concept by Mbongeni Ngema
- Productions: 1987 Johannesburg; 1988 Broadway

Sarafina! is a South African musical written and directed by Mbongeni Ngema with music by Hugh Masekela depicting students involved in the Soweto Riots in opposition to apartheid. It was also adapted into a 1992 film starring Whoopi Goldberg and Leleti Khumalo.

Sarafina! The play was first presented at The Market Theatre, Johannesburg, South Africa, in June 1987. Following that success, it premiered on Broadway on 28 January 1988, at the Cort Theatre, and closed on 2 July 1989, after 597 performances and 11 previews. The musical was conceived and directed by Mbongeni Ngema, who also wrote the book. He wrote the music and lyrics alongside Hugh Masekela. The cast included Leleti Khumalo as Sarafina.

Two separate casts toured Sarafina! in the US and Europe. The majority of the performers were South African teenagers that Ngema cast in Johannesburg, and for many, performing on Broadway was their first experience overseas. While not performing, the cast attended high school and college classes in New York.

Leleti Khumalo received a Tony Award nomination for Best Featured Actress in a Musical, as well as an NAACP Image Award for her Broadway theatre portrayal of the title character. The production was also nominated for the Tony Awards for: Best Musical, Best Original Score, Best Choreography, and Best Direction of a Musical.

The show is based on the experiences of students at Morris Isaacson High School during the Soweto uprising of 16 June 1976. A narrator introduces several characters, among them the schoolgirl activist Sarafina. The students sing about their day-to-day lives under apartheid, including student protests, violent encounters with the police, and funerals for classmates. After Sarafina is briefly detained and tortured, the students decide to write and perform a play-within-a-play about the hoped for day when Nelson Mandela is released from prison.

The production of the play was chronicled in the documentary film Voices of Sarafina!.

== Musical numbers ==
As listed in the Original Broadway Cast Recording:

- "Overture"
- "Zibuyile Emasisweni"
- "Sarafina"
- "The Lord's Prayer"
- "Yes, Mistress It's a Pity"
- "Give Us Power"
- "Afuni Amaphoyisa eSoweto"
- "Freedom is Coming Tomorrow"
- "Excuse Me Baby"
- "Meeting Tonight"
- "Stand and Fight"
- "Uyamemeza Umgoma"
- "Voster Sisolilwela"
- "Wawungalelani"
- "Mama"
- "Sechaba"
- "Isizwe"
- "Goodbye"
- "Kilimanjaro"
- "Africa Burning in the Sun"
- "Olayithi"
- "Bring Back Nelson Mandela"
- "Freedom is Coming Tomorrow (reprise)"
