= Mbongeni Ngema =

South African playwright and musician (1955–2023)

- Born: 10 May 1955; Verulam, Natal, Union of South Africa
- Died: 27 December 2023 (aged 68); Winnie Madikizela-Mandela Local Municipality, Eastern Cape, South Africa
- Occupations: Playwright; writer; composer; director; producer; actor
- Spouses: Xoliswa Nduneni-Ngema (m. 1983; div. 1992) Leleti Khumalo (m. 1992; div. 2005)
- Partner: nompumelelo Gumede Ngema
- Writing career
- Language: English
- Notable works: Sarafina! Woza Albert!

Mbongeni Ngema (10 May 1955 – 27 December 2023) was a South African playwright, lyricist, composer, director, choreographer and theatre producer, best known for co-writing the 1981 play Woza Albert! and co-writing (with Hugh Masekela) the 1987 musical Sarafina!. He was known for plays that reflected the spirit of black South Africans under apartheid, and won much praise for his work, but was also the subject of several controversies. He died in a car accident on 27 December 2023.

== Early life and education ==
Mbongeni Ngema was born on 10 May 1955 (Note: One source cites 1 June 1955) in Verulam, Natal (near Durban), the third of seven children of Gladys Hadebe and Zwelikhethabantu Ngema. Zwelikhethabantu was a policeman who had been born in the village of eNhlwathi, in kwaHlabisa, outside Mtubatuba, and was stationed at Verulam. This was a predominantly Indian area, but there were many Black residents too. After the 1950 Group Areas Act, Verulam was reclassified for Indians only, so black Africans were relocated, including the policeman's children, to kwaHlabisa, to live with their grandfather. There Mbongeni and his siblings lived a rural life, getting up early to tend to the animals before school, which he attended until Standard Six.

He moved back to Verulam and then Durban to attend various high schools. In Umlazi, he attended Vukuzakhe High School, but dropped out in his final year and started playing music in local bands. He taught himself to play the guitar, inspired by his father.

== Career ==
Ngema moved to Johannesburg, initially working in a fertilizer factory. There he played guitar backing for a workers' production, and was then asked to fill in for an actor who had fallen ill. He joined Gibson Kente's theatre company as a singer and trainee actor, and was exposed to the work of Stanislavski, Peter Brook and Jerzy Grotowski. He acted in local productions in the 1970s. He later became a playwright, screenwriter, and librettist.

He became well known in the 1980s after co-writing the comedy/drama Woza Albert! with fellow actor Percy Mtwa (1981; toured the U.S. 1984) and the multi-award-winning musical Sarafina! (premiered 1988). He wrote about and was known for his representation of the spirit of Black South Africans under the apartheid regime.

After founding his own theatre company, Committed Artists, Ngema trained young men who had no experience in acting. He wrote and in 1983 directed a production of the prison musical Asinamali, which, soon after its first performance in South Africa was raided by police and actors arrested. The story is based on a famous rent strike in a Durban township, and toured to New York City, premiering at the Roger Furman Theatre and being nominated for a Tony Award. The musical has been mounted around the world in various places, including Australia with an upcoming 2024 production in South Africa at the National Arts Festival. A film of the musical was released in 2017, co-written, directed by Ngema, in which he starred as Comrade Washington.

Sarafina! (1988), set in the Soweto uprising of 1976, was nominated for five Tony Awards, and was later also nominated for the Grammy Awards. The musical won 11 NAACP Image Awards, enjoyed a two-year run on Broadway, toured the US, Europe, Australia, and Japan, and was later adapted into a feature film starring Whoopi Goldberg, Leleti Khumalo, and Miriam Makeba.

Township Fever (1990), about a major workers' strike, was very successful, and was produced in the U.S. after a production at the Market Theatre. In the same year, Ngema co-wrote (with Duma ka Ndlovu) and directed his first American work, Sheila's Day, staged by African American theatre company Crossroads Theatre.

Ngema was one of the vocal arrangers for the Disney film The Lion King (1994), for which he earned a multi-platinum award for sales in excess of 6 million copies. Also in 1994, he co-wrote the song "African Solution" with Mfiliseni Magubane for the National Peace Committee, with all proceeds going to the committee to assist families affected by violence. The song was awarded gold and platinum discs.

Mama (1995) was a musical about Soweto gangsters. It was produced by The Playhouse Company and toured Europe, Australia, and New Zealand. In the same year, Ngema presented The Best of Mbongeni Ngema at The Playhouse, and a CD and video of the performance was released.

In 1995, Ngema created Sarafina II, a musical addressing the AIDS epidemic in South Africa, which debuted in early 1996.

In 1997, Ngema was both composer and producer of his solo album Woza My Fohloza, which he showcased on a tour of South Africa. He wrote and composed Maria–Maria, and choreographed and directed a production which premiered at Wiesbaden in 1997 and then toured Germany and Austria before opening at The Playhouse.

Also in 1997, Ngema was appointed a visiting lecturer at the University of Zululand to teach his unique technique and subsequently produced the first CD released by the university's music department.

In 1998, Ngema was inducted into the New York "Walk of Fame" in front of the Lucille Lortel Theatre in Manhattan, New York City, as one of the revered writers of the 21st century. In 2001 during the African Renaissance festival, his name was engraved on the entrance of the City Hall in Durban alongside those of Nelson Mandela, Oliver Tambo, Miriam Makeba, and other heroes of the liberation struggle.

The City of Durban commissioned Ngema to compose a song to celebrate the new millennium (2000).

In 2003, he was appointed artistic director for the 2003 Cricket World Cup.

The House of Shaka (2005), a play inspired by the life of King Goodwill Zwelithini, was very well received by audiences in Gauteng and KwaZulu-Natal.

A revival of Sarafina! was created as part of the "10 Years of Democracy" celebrations in 2004. After being approached by a Nigerian production company who had seen House of Shaka, the production was staged in Nigeria in December 2005, for a week in Lagos and then a week in Abuja, in its first tour of the African continent. It went on to play in London as well as playing at the Emperors Palace in Johannesburg from 1 June 2006.

In 2006, the South African government commissioned Ngema to write 1906 Bhambada The Freedom Fighter, to celebrate the centenary of the Zulu Rebellion against the settler government in the colony of Natal, led by Bhambatha. It ran for two weeks in Pietermaritzburg.

Lion of the East was commissioned by Mpumalanga Province in 2009 to mark the 50th Anniversary of the Potato Strike which took place in Bethal in the former Eastern Transvaal, led by Gert Sibande.

In 2013, his play The Zulu received standing ovations at the National Arts Festival in Grahamstown (Makhanda). It also played in Wiesbaden, Germany to excellent reviews, followed by a successful tour of Europe before returning to South Africa in 2000 to run at the Market Theatre, Johannesburg, and The Playhouse in Durban.

As a librettist, Ngema wrote the musical soundtrack for Sarafina – the movie (1992). He also composed several music albums, including Stimela SaseZola, which was at the time his biggest album in South Africa. He wrote and arranged numerous songs as well as arranging music for artists such as Michael Bolton, on the soundtrack for the 1989 film Sing.

== Musical collaborations ==
Ngema participated in a song called "Take This Song", recorded with the reggae band Third World, co-writing the backing vocals.

In 2020 he released the album Freedom is Coming Tomorrow (Remix) with Emtee, Saudi, Gigi Lamayne, Tamarsha, Reason, Blaklez & DJ Machaba, and Third World, and a single, "Sophia" in the same year.

== Honours and awards ==
- 1987: Tony Award – Asinamali! nominated for Best Direction of a Play
- 1988: Tony Award – Sarafina! received five nominations: Best Choreography, Best Direction of a Musical, Best Original Score, Best Actress in a Musical
- 1988: Grammy Award – Sarafina! nominated for a Grammy Award at 32nd Annual Grammy Awards
- 1987/8: NAACP Image Award, Best Stage Actress, for Khumalo in Sarafina!, and 10 other NAACP Awards
- 1994/5: Grammy Award – The Lion King, for vocal arrangements
- 1996: FNB-Vita Award for Best Supporting Actor, in a production of Asinamali at The Playhouse, Durban
- 1998: Inducted in the New York "Walk of Fame" in front of the Lucille Lortel Theatre in Manhattan, New York City
- 2001: Name engraved on Durban City Hall entrance, alongside those of Nelson Mandela, Oliver Tambo, Miriam Makeba, and other heroes of the liberation struggle
- 2004: Voted 92nd in the Top 100 Great South Africans
- 2008: Living Legend Award from the EThekwini Metropolitan Municipality, Durban
- 2013: Inaugural Recognition Award at SAMRO's Wawela Awards
- 2013: Lifetime Achievement Award at the inaugural Simon Mabhunu Sabela Film and Television Awards
- 2013: Awarded honorary doctorate by the University of Zululand
- 2014: Awarded Lifetime Achievement Award at the Naledi Theatre Awards ceremony.
- 2016: 9 May declared as "Duma Ndlovu and Mbongeni Ngema Day" in Harlem, New York
- 2018: SAMA Lifetime Achievement Award
- 2020: honorary doctorate, Good Shepherd College of Religion, Culture, and Skills Training
- 2023: 365 Men's Award, posthumously awarded by Gauteng Social Development Department, to acknowledge his "transformation from an abuser of women to speaking out against gender-based violence"

== Selected productions ==
Ngema's productions, many of which are available on recording platforms and CDs, include:

- Asinamali (1987)
- Sarafina! (1987)
- Magic at 4 AM (1993)
- Mama (1996)
- Sarafina! 2 (1997)
- Nikeziwe (2005)
- The House of Shaka (2006)
- 1906 Bhambada The Freedom Fighter
- Lion of the East (2009)
- The Zulu (2013)

== Other notable music ==
In 1985 the album S'timela Sase Zola, with its title track of the same name, was one of his biggest hits in South Africa. The song was re-released on the 2002 album Jive Madlokovu!!! (2002), along with a music video featuring dancing by a large group of Zulu dancers.

In 2004, to celebrate 10 years of the new South Africa, he released Libuyile ("Songs of Freedom").

Other albums include Township Fever (1991), Magic At 4am (1993), The Best Of Mbongeni Ngema (1995), Woza My-Fohloza (1997), and Sarafina! (2004).

Committed Artists launched as a record label in 2005, whose first two CD releases were Ngema's My Baby, and Nikeziwe, a debut album for 23-year-old Jumaima Julius written by Ngema for her. He had heard her when she was working on a play at the South African State Theatre, and decided to mentor her.

== Personal life ==
Ngema married Xoliswa Nduneni-Ngema in February 1982. After they divorced, Nduneni-Ngema published a memoir in which she accused him of abuse, which included allegations of rape. During the marriage, he had a long-running affair with actress Leleti Khumalo, starting when she was still a teenager. He remained married, with Nduneni-Ngema acting as his business partner during the making of the film of Sarafina, in which Khumalo starred. After the film's release in October 1992, the couple divorced, and he married Khumalo.

Khumalo was 15 years younger than Ngema. They divorced in 2005 after she left him. She later called her marriage "disgusting", saying that she was not allowed any freedom and had "fourteen years of misery".

== Death and legacy ==
Ngema died in a head-on car collision on 27 December 2023, while returning from a funeral in Lusikisiki, Eastern Cape; he was a passenger. Ngema was 68 at the time of his death.

Cyril Ramaphosa, the president of South Africa as well as the head of the ruling African National Congress (ANC) party, paid tribute to Ngema, saying that his "masterfully creative narration of our liberation struggle honoured the humanity of oppressed South Africans" and "exposed the inhumanity" of the apartheid regime. Opposition party Economic Freedom Fighters wrote that he was "more than just an artist; he was a cultural icon, and a beacon of hope during some of our darkest times". Actress Sophie Ndaba posted a tribute to him on Instagram.

Works about Ngema and his works include Nothing Except Ourselves by Laura Jones (1994).

Ngema was buried on 5 January 2024.

== Controversies ==
In 1996, the planned 12-month run of Sarafina II was cancelled due to corruption allegations, which implicated Ngema as well as the Minister of Health Nkosazana Dlamini-Zuma. The play had been commissioned by the new post-apartheid government at a cost of R 14m (US$750,000), which the Public Protector, South Africa's anti-corruption watchdog, investigated. It found that the health department's funding was an "unauthorised expenditure", and its messaging about the HIV/AIDS epidemic was unsatisfactory. In 1997, Ngema was investigated for fraud concerning the spending of the R3m paid to him for the play.

In 2002 Ngema composed a song called "AmaNdiya", which was critical of how the Indian people of KwaZulu Natal were treating its employees and paying them a pittance. This song was banned from public broadcast by the Broadcasting Complaints Commission of South Africa, after the SA Human Rights Commission lodged a complaint. The judgment said that the song "promoted hate in sweeping, emotive language against Indians as a race", and incited fear among Indians for their safety. Many people criticised the song and there was even a motion in parliament by ANC MP Alfred Maphalala to demand an apology. Nelson Mandela also called on Ngema to apologise for the lyrics.

In July 2019, Ngema was removed from his position as co-director of a production of Sarafina following allegations of sexual harassment and intimidation by a cast member.
