= Alan Rickman on screen and stage =

English actor of the stage and screen

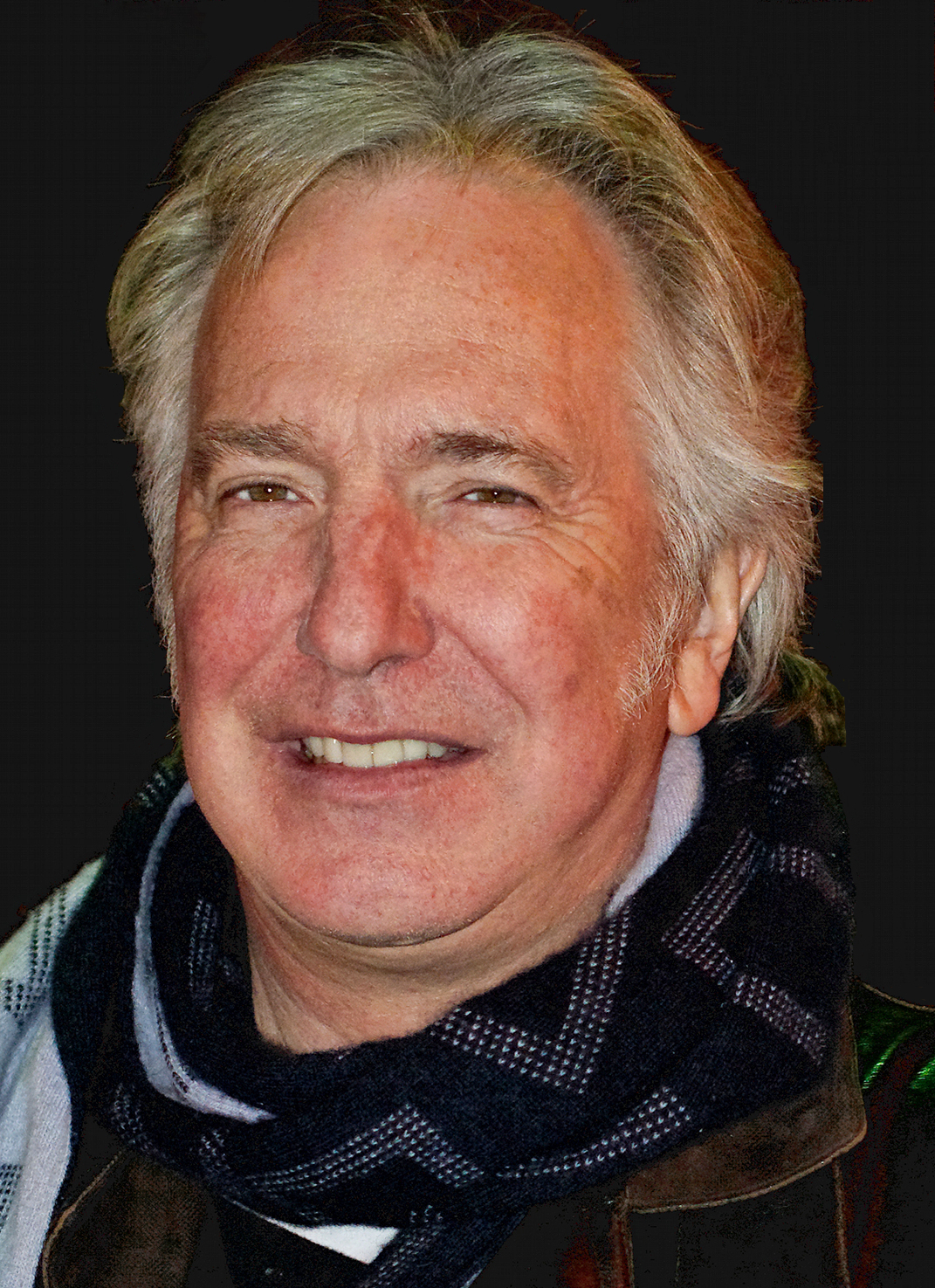
Rickman at the Brooklyn Academy of Music in 2011

Alan Rickman was an English actor of the stage and screen. Rickman gained international acclaim for his role as Hans Gruber in the action film Die Hard (1988) and Severus Snape in the Harry Potter film series (2001–2011). He is also known for his performances in films such as the romance drama Truly, Madly, Deeply (1991), Robin Hood: Prince of Thieves (1991), Ang Lee's adaptation of the Jane Austen novel Sense and Sensibility (1995), Neil Jordan's historical drama Michael Collins (1995), Richard Curtis' romantic comedy Love Actually (2003), and the science fiction comedies Galaxy Quest (1999) and The Hitchhiker's Guide to the Galaxy (2005).

== Acting credits ==
=== Film ===
Year	Title	Role	Notes	Ref.
1988	Die Hard	Hans Gruber		
1989	The January Man	Ed		
1990	Quigley Down Under	Elliot Marston		
1991	Truly, Madly, Deeply	Jamie		
1991	Closet Land	Interrogator		
1991	Robin Hood: Prince of Thieves	Sheriff of Nottingham		
1991	Close My Eyes	Sinclair / Natalie's husband		
1992	Bob Roberts	Lukas Hart III		
1994	Mesmer	Franz Anton Mesmer		
1995	An Awfully Big Adventure	P. L. O'Hara		
1995	Sense and Sensibility	Colonel Brandon		
1996	Michael Collins	Éamon de Valera		
1997	The Winter Guest	Man in street	Uncredited; also director and co-writer	
1998	Judas Kiss	Detective David Friedman		
1998	Dark Harbor	David Weinberg		
1999	Dogma	Metatron		
1999	Galaxy Quest	Alexander Dane		
2000	Help! I'm a Fish	Joe	Voice	
2001	Blow Dry	Phil Allen		
2001	Play	Man		
2001	The Search for John Gissing	John Gissing		
2001	Harry Potter and the Philosopher's Stone	Severus Snape		
2002	Harry Potter and the Chamber of Secrets	Severus Snape		
2003	Love Actually	Harry		
2004	Harry Potter and the Prisoner of Azkaban	Severus Snape		
2005	Harry Potter and the Goblet of Fire	Severus Snape		
2005	The Hitchhiker's Guide to the Galaxy	Marvin the Paranoid Android	Voice	
2006	Snow Cake	Alex Hughes		
2006	Perfume: The Story of a Murderer	Richis		
2007	Nobel Son	Eli Michaelson		
2007	Harry Potter and the Order of the Phoenix	Severus Snape		
2007	Sweeney Todd: The Demon Barber of Fleet Street	Judge Turpin		
2008	Bottle Shock	Steven Spurrier		
2009	Harry Potter and the Half-Blood Prince	Severus Snape		
2010	Harry Potter and the Deathly Hallows – Part 1	Severus Snape		
2010	Alice in Wonderland	Absolem the Caterpillar	Voice	
2010	The Wildest Dream	Noel Odell	Voice, Documentary	
2011	Portraits in Dramatic Time	Himself		
2011	Harry Potter and the Deathly Hallows – Part 2	Severus Snape		
2011	The Boy in the Bubble	Narrator	Voice, Short film	
2012	Gambit	Lord Shahbandar		
2013	The Butler	Ronald Reagan		
2013	A Promise	Karl Hoffmeister		
2013	Dust	Todd	Short Film	
2013	CBGB	Hilly Kristal		
2014	A Little Chaos	Louis XIV	Also director and co-writer	
2015	Eye in the Sky	Lieutenant General Frank Benson	Last on-screen appearance	
2016	Alice Through the Looking Glass	Absolem The Butterfly	Voice, posthumous release Dedicated to his memory	

=== Television ===
Year	Title	Role	Notes	Ref.
1978	Romeo and Juliet	Tybalt	BBC Television Shakespeare	
1980	Thérèse Raquin	Vidal	3 episodes	
1980	Shelley	Clive	Episode: "Nowt So Queer"	
1982	Busted	Simon	Television film	
1982	Smiley's People	Mr Brownlow	1 episode	
1982	The Barchester Chronicles	Obadiah Slope	5 episodes	
1985	Summer Season	Croop	Episode: "Pity in History"	
1985	Girls on Top	Dmitri / RADA	3 episodes	
1989	Revolutionary Witness	Jacques Roux	Television short	
1989	ScreenPlay	Israel Yates	Episode: "The Spirit of Man"	
1993	Fallen Angels	Dwight Billings	Episode: "Murder, Obliquely"	
1996	Rasputin: Dark Servant of Destiny	Grigori Rasputin	Television film	
2000	Victoria Wood with All the Trimmings	Captain George Fallon	Sketch: Plots and Proposals	
2002	King of the Hill	King Philip	Voice, Episode: "Joust Like a Woman"	
2004	Something the Lord Made	Dr. Alfred Blalock	Television film	
2010	The Song of Lunch	He	Television film	

=== Theatre ===
Year	Title	Role	Venue	Ref.
1974	Babes in the Wood	King Rat	Library Theatre, Manchester	
1974	Romeo and Juliet	Paris	Haymarket Theatre, Leicester	
1975	Joseph and the Amazing Technicolor Dreamcoat	Asher	Haymarket Theatre, Leicester	
1975	Guys and Dolls	Liverlips Louie	Haymarket Theatre, Leicester	
1976	The Carnation Gang	Daniel	Crucible Theatre, Sheffield	
1976	Nijinsky	Nijinsky	Crucible Theatre, Sheffield	
1976	When We Dead Awaken	Arnold Rubek	Crucible Theatre, Sheffield	
1976	Sherlock Holmes	Sherlock Holmes	Birmingham Repertory Theatre	
1976–1977	The Devil is an Ass	Wittipol	Birmingham Repertory Theatre	
1978	The Tempest	Ferdinand	Royal Shakespeare Theatre	
1978	Captain Swing	Farquarson	The Other Place, Stratford-upon-Avon	
1978	Love's Labour's Lost	Boyet	Royal Shakespeare Theatre	
1980	Commitments	Unknown	Royal Shakespeare Company	
1981	The Seagull	Mr. Aston	The Royal Court Theatre	
1983	The Grass Widow	Dennis	The Royal Court Theatre	
1983	Bad Language	Bob	The Royal Court Theatre	
1985	As You Like It	Jaques	Royal Shakespeare Theatre	
1985	Troilus and Cressida	Achilles	Royal Shakespeare Theatre	
1985	Les Liaisons Dangereuses	Le Vicomte de Valmont	The Other Place, Stratford-upon-Avon	
1986	Les Liaisons Dangereuses	Le Vicomte de Valmont	The Pit, Barbican Centre, London	
1986	Mephisto	Hendrik Hofgen	Barbican Theatre, Barbican Centre	
1987	Les Liaisons Dangereuses	Le Vicomte de Valmont	Music Box Theatre, Broadway	
1991	Tango at the End of Winter	Sei	Piccadilly Theatre, West End	
1992	Hamlet	Hamlet	Riverside Studios, London	
1995	The Winter Guest	Director	Almeida Theatre, West End	
1998	Antony and Cleopatra	Mark Antony	Royal National Theatre, London	
2001–2002	Private Lives	Elyot Chase	Richard Rodgers Theatre, Broadway	
2006	My Name is Rachel Corrie	Director and Editor	Minetta Lane Theatre, Broadway	
2008	Creditors	Director	Donmar Warehouse, London	
2010–2011	John Gabriel Borkman	John Gabriel Borkman	Abbey Theatre, Dublin; Brooklyn Academy of Music	
2011–2012	Seminar	Leonard	John Golden Theatre, Broadway	

== Video games ==
Year	Title	Voice	Ref.
1997	The Space Bar	My Parker / Ty Parker	

== See also ==
- List of awards and nominations received by Alan Rickman
