= Eye in the Sky (2015 film) =

2015 British film by Gavin Hood

- British release poster
- Directed by: Gavin Hood
- Written by: Guy Hibbert
- Produced by: Ged Doherty; Colin Firth; David Lancaster
- Starring: Helen Mirren; Aaron Paul; Alan Rickman; Barkhad Abdi; Jeremy Northam; Iain Glen
- Cinematography: Haris Zambarloukos
- Edited by: Megan Gill
- Music by: Paul Hepker; Mark Kilian
- Production companies: Entertainment One Features; Raindog Films
- Distributed by: Entertainment One
- Release dates: 11 September 2015 (TIFF); 15 April 2016 (United Kingdom)
- Running time: 102 minutes
- Country: United Kingdom
- Language: English
- Budget: $13 million
- Box office: $35.4 million

Eye in the Sky is a 2015 British thriller film starring Helen Mirren, Aaron Paul, Alan Rickman, and Barkhad Abdi. Directed by Gavin Hood and written by Guy Hibbert, the film explores the ethical challenges of drone warfare. Filming began in South Africa in September 2014.

The film premiered at the 2015 Toronto International Film Festival on 11 September 2015. Bleecker Street distributed the film in cinemas in the United States with a limited release on 11 March 2016 and then a wide release on 1 April.

It is the last live-action film to feature Alan Rickman, who died on 14 January 2016 (his last film overall, Alice Through the Looking Glass, features his voice acting only). The film was dedicated to his memory.

== Plot ==
British Army Colonel Katherine Powell discovers an undercover British/Kenyan agent has been murdered by the Al-Shabaab group. From Northwood Headquarters, she takes command of a mission to capture three of the ten highest-level Al-Shabaab leaders meeting in a safe house in Nairobi.

A multinational team works on the capture mission, linked by video and voice systems. Aerial surveillance is provided by a USAF MQ-9 Reaper drone controlled from Creech Air Force Base in Nevada by Second Lieutenant Steve Watts. Undercover Kenyan field agents, including Jama Farah, use short-range ornithopter and insectothopter cameras to link in ground intelligence. Kenyan special forces are positioned nearby to make the arrest. Facial recognition to identify human targets is done at Joint Intelligence Center Pacific at Pearl Harbor. The mission is supervised in the United Kingdom by a COBRA meeting that includes British Lieutenant General Frank Benson, two government ministers and a ministerial under-secretary.

Farah discovers three high-level targets arming two suicide bombers for a presumed attack on a civilian target, prompting Powell to change the mission objective from "capture" to "kill". She requests Watts prepare a precision Hellfire missile attack on the building and solicits the opinion of her British Army legal counsel who advises her to seek approval from superiors. Frustrated, Benson asks permission from the COBRA members, who can't find consensus and refer the question to the UK Foreign Secretary who is on a trade mission to Singapore. He in turn defers to the United States Secretary of State, who declares the American suicide bomber an enemy of the state. The Foreign Secretary then insists that COBRA take due diligence to minimise collateral damage.

Alia, who lives next door, is near the target building selling her mother's bread. The senior military personnel stress the risk of letting would-be suicide bombers leave the house. The lawyers and politicians involved in the chain of command argue the personal, political, and legal merits around launching a Hellfire missile attack in a friendly country not at war with the US or UK, with the significant risk of collateral damage. Watts sees a more direct risk of little Alia selling bread outside the targeted building, and they delay firing until she moves.

Farah is directed to buy all of Alia's bread so she will leave, but doing so blows his cover, and he flees without collecting it. Seeking authorisation to execute the strike, Powell orders her risk-assessment officer to find parameters that will let him quote a lower 45% risk of civilian deaths. He re-evaluates the strike point and assesses the probability of Alia's death at 45–65%. She makes him confirm only the lower figure which she reports up the chain of command. The strike is authorised, and Watts fires. The missile destroys the building and injures Alia, but one conspirator survives. Watts is ordered to fire a second missile, which strikes the site just as Alia's parents reach her. They rush Alia to a hospital.

In the London situation room, the under-secretary berates Benson for killing from the safety of his chair. Benson counters that he has been on the ground in the aftermath of five suicide bombings and adds as he is leaving, provoking her to tears: "Never tell a soldier that he does not know the cost of war."

At the hospital, Alia is pronounced dead.

== Cast ==
United Kingdom

- Helen Mirren as Colonel Katherine Powell, British Army, a UK military intelligence officer
- Alan Rickman as Lieutenant General Frank Benson, Royal Marines. Deputy Chief of the Defence Staff
- Jeremy Northam as Brian Woodale MP, the Minister of State for Foreign Affairs
- Monica Dolan as Angela Northman MP, the Parliamentary Under-Secretary of State for Africa
- Richard McCabe as Attorney General George Matherson
- Babou Ceesay as Sergeant Mushtaq Saddiq, Royal Artillery, Risk Assessment Officer
- John Heffernan as Major Harold Webb, Army Legal Services Branch
- Iain Glen as James Willett MP, the Foreign Secretary
- Carl Beukes as Sergeant Mike Gleeson

United States

- Aaron Paul as 2nd Lieutenant Steve Watts, USAF, a USAF MQ-9 pilot
- Phoebe Fox as A1C Carrie Gershon, USAF, a USAF MQ-9 systems operator
- Michael O'Keefe as US Secretary of State Ken Stanitzke
- Laila Robins as Ms Jillian Goldman, US National Security Council Senior Legal Advisor
- Lemogang Tsipa as SrA Matt Levery, USAF
- Gavin Hood as Lieutenant Colonel Ed Walsh, USAF
- Kim Engelbrecht as A1C Lucy Galvez, USAF

Kenya

- Barkhad Abdi as Jama Farah, an undercover Kenyan NIS agent
- Armaan Haggio as Musa Mo'Allim
- Aisha Takow as Alia Mo'Allim
- Warren Masemola as Atieno, a Kenyan NIS agent
- Ebby Weyime as Damisi, a Kenyan NIS agent
- Vusi Kunene as Major Moses Owiti, leader of the Kenyan Army Special Forces
- Lex King as Susan Danford / Ayesha Al-Hady

== Crew ==
- Gavin Hood – director
- Ged Doherty – producer
- Colin Firth – producer
- David Lancaster – producer
- Guy Hibbert – writer
- Megan Gill – editor
- Johnny Breedt – production designer
- Nico Louw – sound recordist
- Paul Hepker – composer
- Mark Kilian – composer

== Production ==
"Drones are new but still a weapon of warfare. It doesn't matter if it's a drone or a sniper rifle, the question is: 'Did we kill the right guy?'"

— Gavin Hood, speaking on the film's subject matter.

Eye in the Sky is directed by Gavin Hood based on a screenplay by Guy Hibbert. The screenplay was a project initially being developed at BBC Films, and FilmNation Entertainment acquired Hibbert's screenplay from BBC in September 2011 for Oliver Hirschbiegel to direct. Production did not happen as anticipated, and Hood sent the screenplay to Xavier Marchand, president of Entertainment One. Marchand decided to develop it to produce a film with Hood directing. Entertainment One partnered with Raindog Films in April 2014 to produce Eye in the Sky with Colin Firth as one of the producers. Actors Helen Mirren and Aaron Paul joined the cast the following month.

Hood, born in South Africa, chose to film Eye in the Sky in his home country. Filming began in South Africa in September 2014. Since the South African Civil Aviation Authority did not grant filmmakers permission to fly real drones in the country's airspace for the production, they used visual effects to display the drones. Hood found practical locations throughout South Africa that substituted for settings in the film: an area that looked like Surrey for Mirren's character, clubs that had the appearance of Las Vegas establishments, and Beaufort West which was a backdrop for the state of Nevada in the United States. The bombed town square was built as a movie set at Cape Town Film Studios. Filming concluded on 4 November 2014. None of the four lead actors—Mirren, Rickman, Paul, and Abdi—met one another during production, instead filming alone with Hood due to their characters' separate locations in the film. For example, despite the two costarring in a pair of films (Eye in the Sky and the animated feature Help! I'm a Fish), Aaron Paul and Alan Rickman had never met each other in person, according to Paul.

Mark Kilian and Paul Hepker, who scored Hood's films Tsotsi (2005) and Rendition (2007), reteamed to score Eye in the Sky as did editor Megan Gill.

== Release ==
Eye in the Sky premiered at the 2015 Toronto International Film Festival on 11 September 2015. The film had its United States premiere on 7 January 2016 at the Palm Springs International Film Festival.

Bleecker Street distributed the film in the United States, releasing it in New York City and Los Angeles on 11 March 2016 and gradually expanding to additional markets on the following two weekends. On 1 April 2016, the film received a wide release. Deadline said this release was positioned to take place after the 2015–2016 awards season.

Entertainment One distributed the film in the United Kingdom on 8 April 2016 and Malta in May 2016. It also distributed the film in Canada, Belgium, the Netherlands, Luxembourg, Spain, Australia, and New Zealand.

== Reception ==
=== Box office ===
Eye in the Sky grossed $6.6 million in the UK, $18.7 million in the US and Canada, and $32.8 million worldwide.

The film grossed $113,803 in the US on its opening weekend of 11–13 March 2016 from five screens, an average of $22,761 per screen. In its wide release, the film grossed $4 million, finishing ninth at the box office.

=== Critical response ===
Eye in the Sky received positive reviews. On Rotten Tomatoes, the film has a rating of 95%, based on 175 critics, with a weighted average score of 7.5/10. The site's consensus reads, "As taut as it is timely, Eye in the Sky offers a powerfully acted – and unusually cerebral – spin on the modern wartime political thriller." On Metacritic, the film has a weighted average score of 73 out of 100, based on 38 critics, indicating "generally favorable" reviews.

Rickman's performance was well received by critics, with Richard Roeper of the Chicago Sun-Times saying, "Mr Rickman was never nominated for an Academy Award and it's probably a long shot for a posthumous Supporting Actor for this film - but his work here is a reminder of what a special talent he possessed."

Peter Asaro on Science & Film reviewed the accuracy of the advanced military technology depicted in the film, concluding, "Keep in mind that while some of the advanced technologies depicted are not yet out in the field, many are only a few years away from being a reality".

== See also ==
- Good Kill, a 2014 film also featuring drone warfare
- List of films featuring drones
- Trolley problem
