= List of awards and nominations received by Alan Rickman =

Alan Rickman awards and nominations
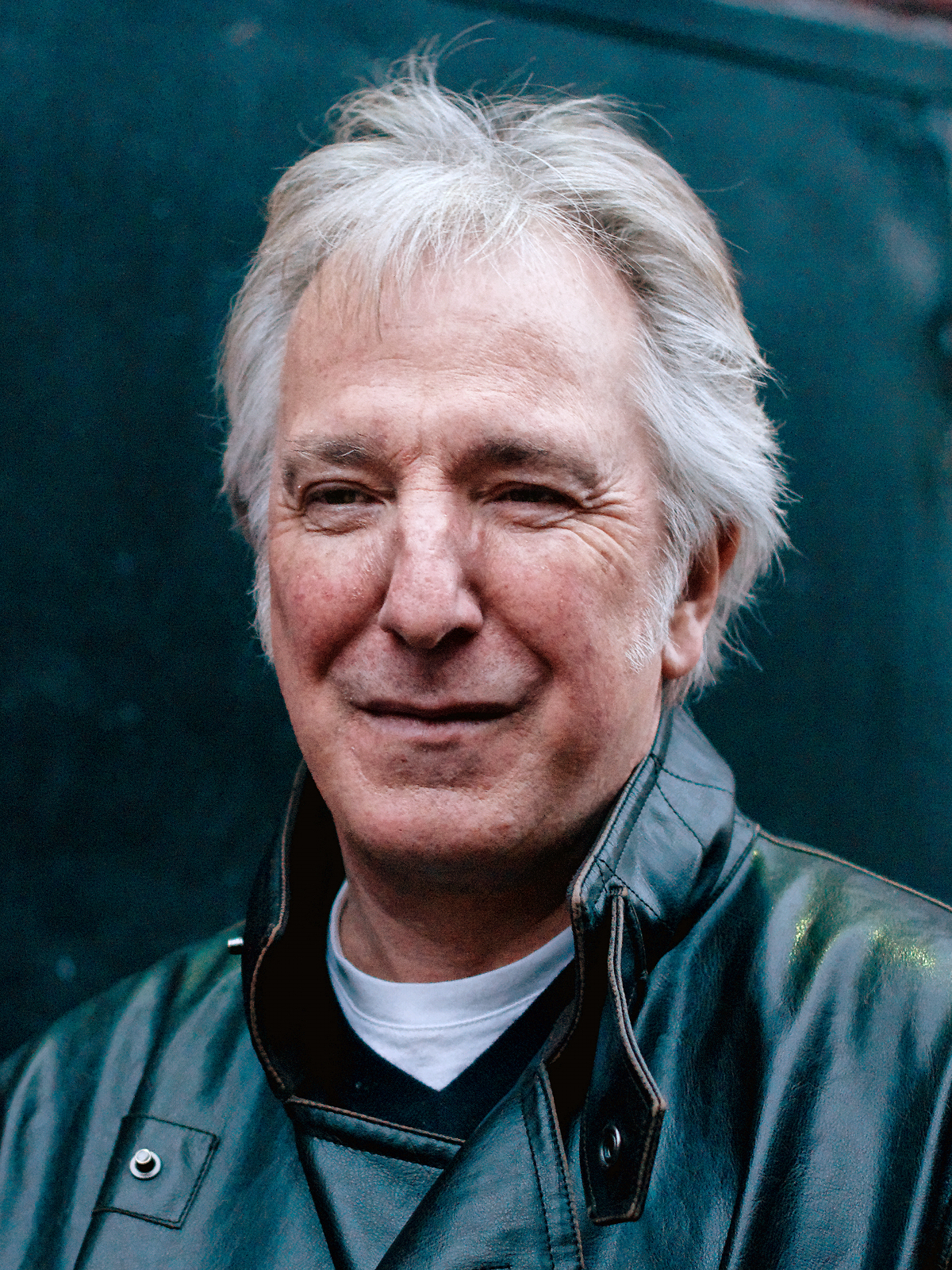
- Rickman at BAM in 2011
Awards and nominations
| Award | Wins | Nominations |
| Actor Awards | 1 | 3 |
| BAFTA Awards | 1 | 4 |
| Emmy Awards | 1 | 2 |
| Golden Globes | 1 | 1 |
| Olivier Awards | 0 | 1 |
| Tony Awards | 0 | 2 |

Totals (Note: Certain award groups do not simply award one winner. They acknowledge several different recipients, have runners-up, and have third place. Since this is a specific recognition and is different from losing an award, runner-up mentions are considered wins in this award tally. For simplification and to avoid errors, each award in this list has been presumed to have had a prior nomination.)
- Wins: 4
- Nominations: 13

The following is a list of awards and nominations received by actor Alan Rickman.

Rickman has received numerous accolades including an Actor Award, a BAFTA Award, a Primetime Emmy Award, and a Golden Globe Award as well as to nominations for two Drama Desk Awards, a Drama League Award, a Laurence Olivier Award, and two Tony Awards.

Rickman received a BAFTA Award for Best Actor in a Supporting Role for his role as the Sheriff of Nottingham in the action-adventure film Robin Hood: Prince of Thieves (1991). Upon receiving the award Rickman stated, "This will be a healthy reminder to me that subtlety isn't everything". He was also BAFTA-nominated for his roles as Jamie in the drama Truly, Madly, Deeply (1991), Colonel Brandon in the costume drama Sense and Sensibility (1995), and Éamon de Valera in the period drama Michael Collins (1996).

For his role as Grigori Rasputin in the HBO film Rasputin: Dark Servant of Destiny (1996) he received the Primetime Emmy Award, the Golden Globe Award and the Screen Actors Guild Award for Best Actor in a Miniseries or TV Movie. He also portrayed Dr. Alfred Blalock in the HBO film Something the Lord Made (2004) for which he was nominated for the Primetime Emmy Award for Outstanding Lead Actor in a Miniseries or a Movie.

Rickman was also known for his extensive work in theatre. For his roles on Broadway he received two Tony Award for Best Actor in a Play nominations for his roles as Le Vicomte de Valmont in Christopher Hampton's Les Liaisons Dangereuses (1987) and as Elyot Chase in the Noël Coward revival Private Lives (2002). He reprised the role in the West End and received a nomination for the Laurence Olivier Award for Best Actor.

== Major Awards ==
=== Actor Awards ===
| Year | Category | Nominated work | Result | Ref. |
|---|---|---|---|---|
| 1995 | Outstanding Ensemble Cast in a Motion Picture | Sense and Sensibility | Nominated | |
| 1996 | Outstanding Actor in a Miniseries or Television Movie | Rasputin: Dark Servant of Destiny | Won | |
| 2013 | Outstanding Ensemble Cast in a Motion Picture | The Butler | Nominated | |

=== BAFTA Awards ===
| Year | Category | Nominated work | Result | Ref. |
British Academy Film Awards
| 1991 | Best Actor in a Leading Role | Truly, Madly, Deeply | Nominated | |
| 1991 | Best Actor in a Supporting Role | Robin Hood: Prince of Thieves | Won | |
| 1995 | Best Actor in a Supporting Role | Sense and Sensibility | Nominated | |
| 1996 | Best Actor in a Supporting Role | Michael Collins | Nominated | |

=== Emmy Awards ===
| Year | Category | Nominated work | Result | Ref. |
Primetime Emmy Awards
| 1996 | Outstanding Lead Actor in a Miniseries or a Movie | Rasputin: Dark Servant of Destiny | Won | |
| 2004 | Outstanding Lead Actor in a Miniseries or a Movie | Something the Lord Made | Nominated | |

=== Golden Globe Awards ===
| Year | Category | Nominated work | Result | Ref. |
|---|---|---|---|---|
| 1997 | Best Actor - Miniseries or Television Film | Rasputin: Dark Servant of Destiny | Won | |

=== Olivier Awards ===
| Year | Category | Nominated work | Result | Ref. |
|---|---|---|---|---|
| 2002 | Best Actor | Private Lives | Nominated | |

=== Tony Awards ===
| Year | Category | Nominated work | Result | Ref. |
|---|---|---|---|---|
| 1987 | Best Actor in a Play | Les Liaisons Dangereuses | Nominated | |
| 2002 | Best Actor in a Play | Private Lives | Nominated | |

== Critics Awards ==
| Year | Association | Category | Nominated work | Result | Ref. |
|---|---|---|---|---|---|
| 2003 | Broadcast Film Critics Association Award | Best Acting Ensemble | Love Actually | Nominated | |
| 2007 | Broadcast Film Critics Association Award | Best Acting Ensemble | Sweeney Todd: The Demon Barber of Fleet Street | Nominated | |
| 2011 | Alliance of Women Film Journalists | Best Supporting Actor | Harry Potter and the Deathly Hallows – Part 2 | Nominated | |
| 2011 | Washington D.C. Area Film Critics Association | Best Cast | Harry Potter and the Deathly Hallows - Part 2 | Nominated | |
| 2002 | Phoenix Film Critics Society Awards | Best Acting Ensemble | Harry Potter and the Chamber of Secrets | Nominated | |
| 2004 | Phoenix Film Critics Society Awards | Best Acting Ensemble | Love Actually | Nominated | |
| 2011 | San Diego Film Critics Society | Best Ensemble Performance | Harry Potter and the Deathly Hallows - Part 2 | Won | |
| 2011 | St. Louis Gateway Film Critics Association | Best Supporting Actor | Harry Potter and the Deathly Hallows - Part 2 | Nominated | |

== Miscellaneous Awards ==
| Organizations | Year | Category | Work | Result | Ref. |
|---|---|---|---|---|---|
| Audie Award | 2010 | Audiobook of the Year | Nelson Mandela's Favorite African Folktales | Won | |
| Audie Award | 2010 | Audie Award for Multi-Voiced Performance | Nelson Mandela's Favorite African Folktales | Won | |
| Drama Desk Award | 1987 | Outstanding Actor in a Play | Les Liaisons Dangereuses | Nominated | |
| Drama Desk Award | 2002 | Outstanding Actor in a Play | Private Lives | Nominated | |
| Drama League Award | 2012 | Outstanding Distinguished Performance | Seminar | Nominated | |
| People's Choice Award | 2011 | Favorite Ensemble Movie Cast | Harry Potter and the Deathly Hallows – Part 2 | Won | |
| Montreal World Film Festival | 1994 | Best Actor | Mesmer | Won | |
| MTV Movie Awards | 1991 | Best Villain | Robin Hood: Prince of Thieves | Nominated | |
| MTV Movie Awards | 2011 | Favorite Harry Potter Character Portrayal | Harry Potter and the Deathly Hallows – Part 2 | Won | |
| Satellite Award | 1996 | Best Actor – Miniseries or Television Film | Rasputin: Dark Servant of Destiny | Won | |
| Satellite Award | 1999 | Best Supporting Actor – Motion Picture | Dogma | Nominated | |
| Satellite Award | 2004 | Best Actor – Miniseries or Television Film | Something the Lord Made | Nominated | |
| Saturn Award | 1992 | Best Supporting Actor | Robin Hood: Prince of Thieves | Nominated | |
| Saturn Award | 2000 | Best Supporting Actor | Galaxy Quest | Nominated | |
| Saturn Award | 2008 | Best Supporting Actor | Sweeney Todd: The Demon Barber of Fleet Street | Nominated | |
| Saturn Award | 2012 | Best Supporting Actor | Harry Potter and the Deathly Hallows – Part 2 | Nominated | |
| Scream Awards | 2009 | Best Ensemble | Harry Potter and the Half-Blood Prince | Won | |
| Scream Awards | 2011 | Best Supporting Actor | Harry Potter and the Deathly Hallows – Part 2 | Nominated | |
| Scream Awards | 2011 | Best Ensemble | Harry Potter and the Deathly Hallows – Part 2 | Nominated | |
