= Threes Anna =

Dutch writer and filmmaker

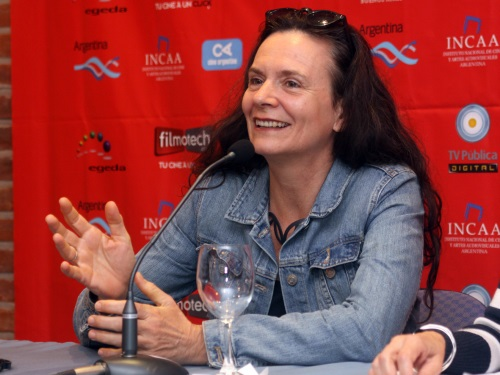

Threes Anna (pseudonym of Threes Schreurs, born in Vlaardingen, The Netherlands, 1959) is a novelist, theatre and film maker.

== Biography ==
Threes Anna is trained as a visual artist. In 1985, Anna was engaged in theatre company Dogtroep, specialized in site specific theatre. In 1989, she becomes artistic leader of the company. Under her leadership, Dogtroep creates over fifty performances all over the world. The performances are developed into big visual spectacles with an international cast. Owing to the extent and complexity of the shows, she doesn't perform herself from 1993 onwards, and concentrated on script writing and directing. Apart from her theatre work, she creates and produces documentaries about several different artists and Dogtroep. After a tragic accident in 1998, in which her partner in life and colleague Marco Biagioni dies, Threes Anna stops with Dogtroep and begins to develop feature films and writing novels.

Since 2003 Threes Anna has published seven novels, De kus van de weduwe ('The Widow's Kiss'), Motormoeder ('Motor Mother', the very first Dutch novel to be downloaded and read on mobile phone), De stille stad ('Silent City'), Vogel kan niet vliegen ('The Bird Can't Fly', after her first feature film), Wachten op de moesson ('Waiting for the Monsoon') (foreign rights were sold before publication to Italia (Mondadori), Spain (MAEVA), Germany (Insel) and Canada (Anansi), Het laatste land ('The Last Land') in 2012 and Paradijsvogel in 2016.

In 2007 Threes Anna's feature film debut, The Bird Can’t Fly is released on the international market, an English spoken full-length movie, that she wrote, directed, and co-produced. The American actress Barbara Hershey has the leading role, the rest of the cast and crew is south-African. The movie had its première at the San Sebastian International Film Festival and won several prizes. In 2012 her second feature film is launched: Silent City (based on her novel De stille stad), playing in Japan. In 2014 her short film Platina Blues, 40 minutes in one hand-held shot, on the composition of the same name by Dutch rock star Thé Lau, is launched.

In September 2020, Threes Anna launched the feature The Warden (de Vogelwachter) a one-actor-movie with the 75-year-old Dutch comedian Freek de Jonge in the lead.

== Prizes ==
Threes Anna's film debut The Bird Can't Fly won these prizes:

- Filmprijs van de stad Utrecht for the best movie debut
- the Stimulans voor Succes Prijs for the most successful films in artistic and commercial ways
- the Jury's Special Award on the Sofia IFF
- the best film and best director at the Zimbabwe IFF
- the best film at the Internazionale del Film di Roma
- the best script at the Madrid-Móstoles IFF.

== Works ==
=== Literature ===
- Paradijsvogel (novel) 2016
- Het laatste land (novel) 2012
- Wachten op de moesson (novel) 2010
- Vogel kan niet vliegen (novel) 2008
- De stille stad (novel) 2006
- Motormoeder (novel) 2005
- De kus van de weduwe (novel) 2003

=== Film ===
- The Warden (de Vogelwachter) a one actor feature film.
- Platina Blues 2014 (40 minutes one-shot film, made on the music and text of Thé Lau)
- Silent City 2012 (feature film, international co-production The Netherlands, Luxembourg and Belgium)
- The Bird Can’t Fly 2007 (feature film, international co-production The Netherlands, South-Africa and Ireland)
- Noordwesterwals 1996 (short film, co-directed by Boris Pavel Conen)

=== Documentary ===
- Portret of Maarten 2003
- De Wals 1996
- Theatre in South Africa 1994

=== Theatre ===
- 1998 Hotazel – outdoor spectacle – tournee The Netherlands
- 1998 2ROOM2 – performance on location – Das Arts Amsterdam
- 1997 Stille Getuigen – performance on location – Diepenheim
- 1997 Adder Zonder Gras – performance on location – Groningen
- 1997 A1 – reisvoorstelling – South-Africa
- 1997 Stemlab – laboratoriumvoorstelling – Amsterdam
- 1996 Kulhavy Tango – performance on location – Archa Theatre Prague Czech Republic
- 1996 Dynamo Mundi – performance on location – Carré Amsterdam
- 1996 Sturm+Stahldraht – performance on location – WMG Gelände Unna Germany
- 1996 Trekpleisters – laboratorium show – Amsterdam
- 1995 theatrical concert – Paradiso Amsterdam
- 1995 Assimil 2 – BITEF festival – Belgrade Serbia
- 1995 Noordwesterwals 2 – performance on location – Amsterdam
- 1995 Assimil 1 – performance on location co-production KPTG – Subotica Serbia
- 1993/1994 New Year's Eve spectacle- live TV show
- 1994 Arts Alive – performance on location – Johannesburg South-Africa
- 1994 Noordwesterwals – performance on location – Amsterdam
- 1994 Camel Gossip III – performance on location opening Skyline Theatre – Chicago USA
- 1993 Liebes Lied – opening Buchmesse – Frankfurt Germany
- 1993 Uwaga Uwaga II – outdoor spectacle – Tilburg
- 1993 Uwaga Uwaga I – outdoor spectacle – Torun Poland
- 1993 Camel Gossip II – performance on location – Schram Studio Amsterdam
- 1992 Camel Gossip I – performance on location – Tramway Glasgow Scotland
- 1992 Special Event – birthday Sonja Barends – live TV show
- 1992 Waterwork – performance on location – World Expo Sevilla Spain
- 1992 Waterwork – performance on location – Zoetermeer
- 1992 La tête d’eau – performance on location Olympic Games Albertville France
- 1991/1992 – New Year's Eve spectacle- live TV show
- 1991 Gestolen Titels – performance on location – Praag Czechoslovakia
- 1991–1993 l’Ascension du Mandarin – traveling show – Europe and Uzbekistan
- 1991 Broederstrijd – outdoor spectacle – Oerol-festival
- 1991 Special – outdoor spectacle – Neu Brandenburg DDR
- 1991 Special – outdoor spectacle – Lille France
- 1991 Vliegtuigje – live TV show
- 1991 outdoor spectacle – Haarlem
- 1991 The Man – outdoor spectacle – Mainz Germany
- 1990/1991 New Year's Eve spectacle– Nieuwmarkt Amsterdam
- 1990 NO-W-All – outdoor spectacle – co-production with Licedei – Berlin Germany
- 1990 Ente II – outdoor spectacle – Chieri Italy
- 1990 Ente I – outdoor spectacle – Grenoble France
- 1990 De springmachine – outdoor spectacle – tour The Netherlands
- 1990 Vingers Branden – performance on location – Korenbeurs Groningen
- 1990 outdoor spectacle – Oerol-festival
- 1989 De Ton – indoor spectacle- Rotterdam
- 1989 Non Inventions – outdoor spectacle – summer tour The Netherlands
- 1989 Cow Girls – outdoor spectacle – tour Italy
- 1989 BiZa – special project – Den Haag
- 1989 De tuin – performance on location – Neerpelt Belgium
- 1989 Zigeunerwereld – indoor show – tour The Netherlands
- 1989 performance on location – Sheffield England
- 1989 Zoutloper –outdoor spectacle – Eemnes and Utrecht
- 1989/1990 – New Year's Eve spectacle – Nieuwmarkt Amsterdam
- 1988 – opening disco Fellini – Utrecht
- 1988 Infiltrations – tour The Netherlands
- 1988 Wit Paard – outdoor spectacle – Leffinge Belgium
- 1988 Siësta – outdoor spectacle – Sabadell Spain
