= Alan Rickman =

English actor (1946–2016)

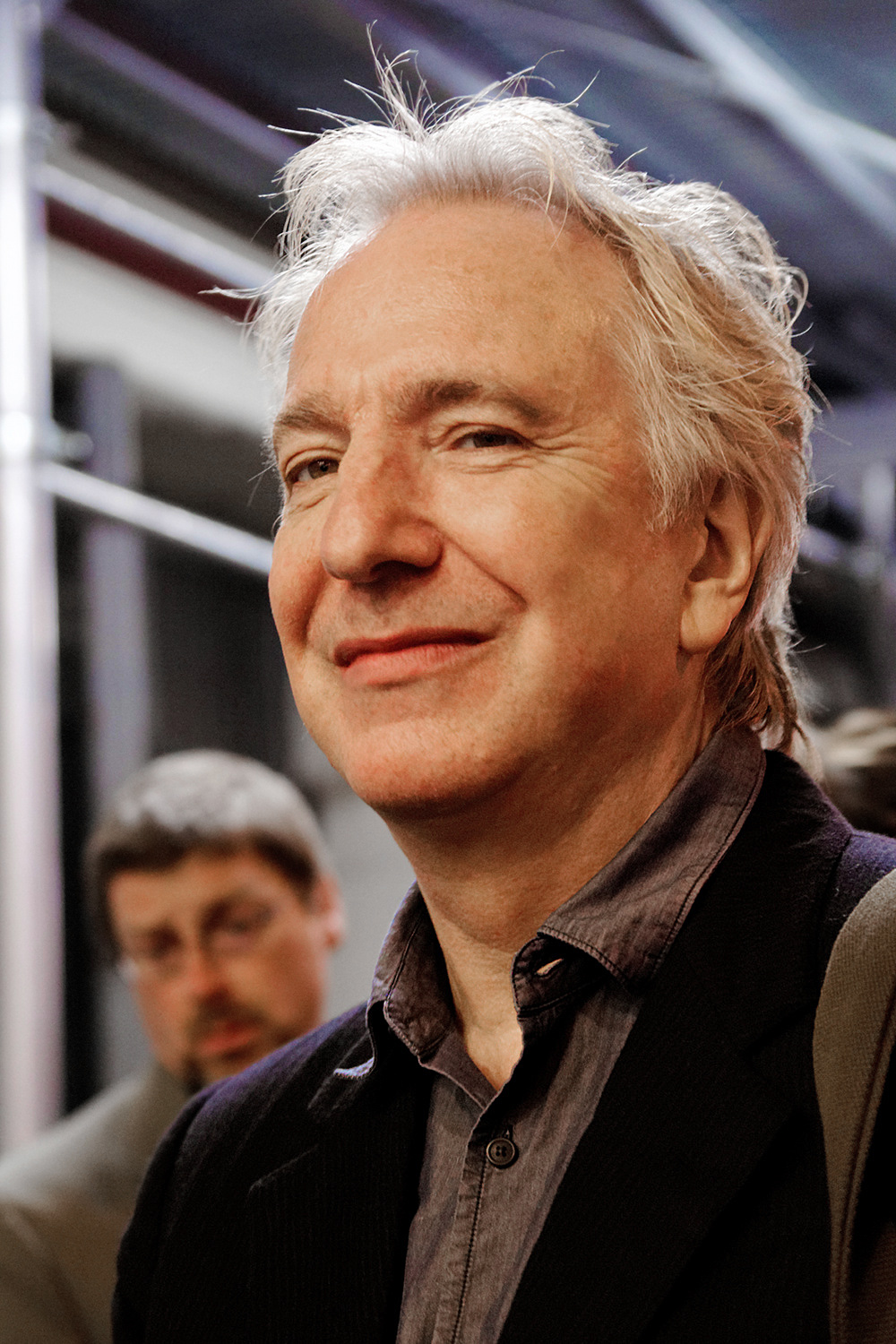
- Rickman in 2011
- Born: 21 February 1946; Brentford, London, England
- Died: 14 January 2016 (aged 69); London, England
- Education: Royal Academy of Dramatic Art
- Occupation: Actor
- Years active: 1974–2016
- Works: Full list
- Spouse: Rima Horton (m. 2012)
- Awards: Full list

Alan Sidney Patrick Rickman (21 February 1946 – 14 January 2016) was an English actor. He was renowned for his stage and screen roles and for his distinctive deep and languid voice. He received various accolades, including a BAFTA Award, a Golden Globe Award, a Primetime Emmy Award, and an Actor Award, in addition to nominations for two Tony Awards and a Laurence Olivier Award. In 2009, The Guardian named him one of the best actors never to have received an Academy Award nomination. Rickman died of pancreatic cancer on 14 January 2016, at the age of 69.

Rickman studied at the Royal Academy of Dramatic Art before becoming a member of the Royal Shakespeare Company where he began his career in theatre, performing in classical and modern plays. He made his film debut as Hans Gruber in Die Hard (1988). He won the BAFTA Award for Best Actor in a Supporting Role for his role as the Sheriff of Nottingham in Robin Hood: Prince of Thieves (1991). He earned critical acclaim for Truly, Madly, Deeply (1991), An Awfully Big Adventure, Sense and Sensibility (both 1995), and Michael Collins (1996).

He went on to play Severus Snape in all eight films of the Harry Potter series (2001–2011) and took memorable roles in Quigley Down Under (1990), Dogma, Galaxy Quest (both 1999), Love Actually (2003), The Hitchhiker's Guide to the Galaxy (2005), Sweeney Todd: The Demon Barber of Fleet Street (2007), Alice in Wonderland (2010), its 2016 sequel, and Eye in the Sky (2015). He directed the films The Winter Guest (1997) and A Little Chaos (2014). On television, he portrayed Grigori Rasputin in the HBO film Rasputin: Dark Servant of Destiny (1996) and Alfred Blalock in the HBO film Something the Lord Made (2004), the former of which won him a Primetime Emmy Award and a Golden Globe Award.

On stage, he made his Broadway debut starring as Le Vicomte de Valmont in the Christopher Hampton play Les Liaisons Dangereuses (1987) for which he was nominated for the Tony Award for Best Lead Actor in a Play. He starred as a newly married man in the revival of Noël Coward's comedic play Private Lives (2002) on the West End and on Broadway, earning a nomination for the Laurence Olivier Award for Best Actor for the former. For his role as an imperious professor in the Theresa Rebeck play Seminar (2011) he was nominated for the Drama League Award.

== Early life and education ==
Alan Sidney Patrick Rickman was born on 21 February 1946 in Brentford, London, and grew up in Acton, London. His parents were housewife Margaret Doreen Rose (née Bartlett) and factory worker, house painter and decorator, and former Second World War aircraft fitter Bernard William Rickman. His mother was Welsh and his paternal grandmother was Irish. Rickman said in 2015, "I was talking to Sharleen Spiteri about being a Celt, how you smell each other out, because my mother's family is Welsh. There's not a lot of English blood in me." His father was a Catholic and his mother a Methodist. He had two brothers, David and Michael, and a sister, Sheila.

Rickman was known for his deep tone of voice and languid delivery for which he would become famous. He said that a vocal coach told him he had a "spastic soft palate". When Rickman was eight years old, his father died of cancer, leaving his mother to raise him and his siblings mostly alone. According to the biographer Maureen Paton, the family was "rehoused by the council and moved to an Acton estate to the west of Wormwood Scrubs Prison, where his mother struggled to bring up four children on her own by working for the Post Office". Margaret Rickman married again in 1960, but divorced Rickman's stepfather after three years.

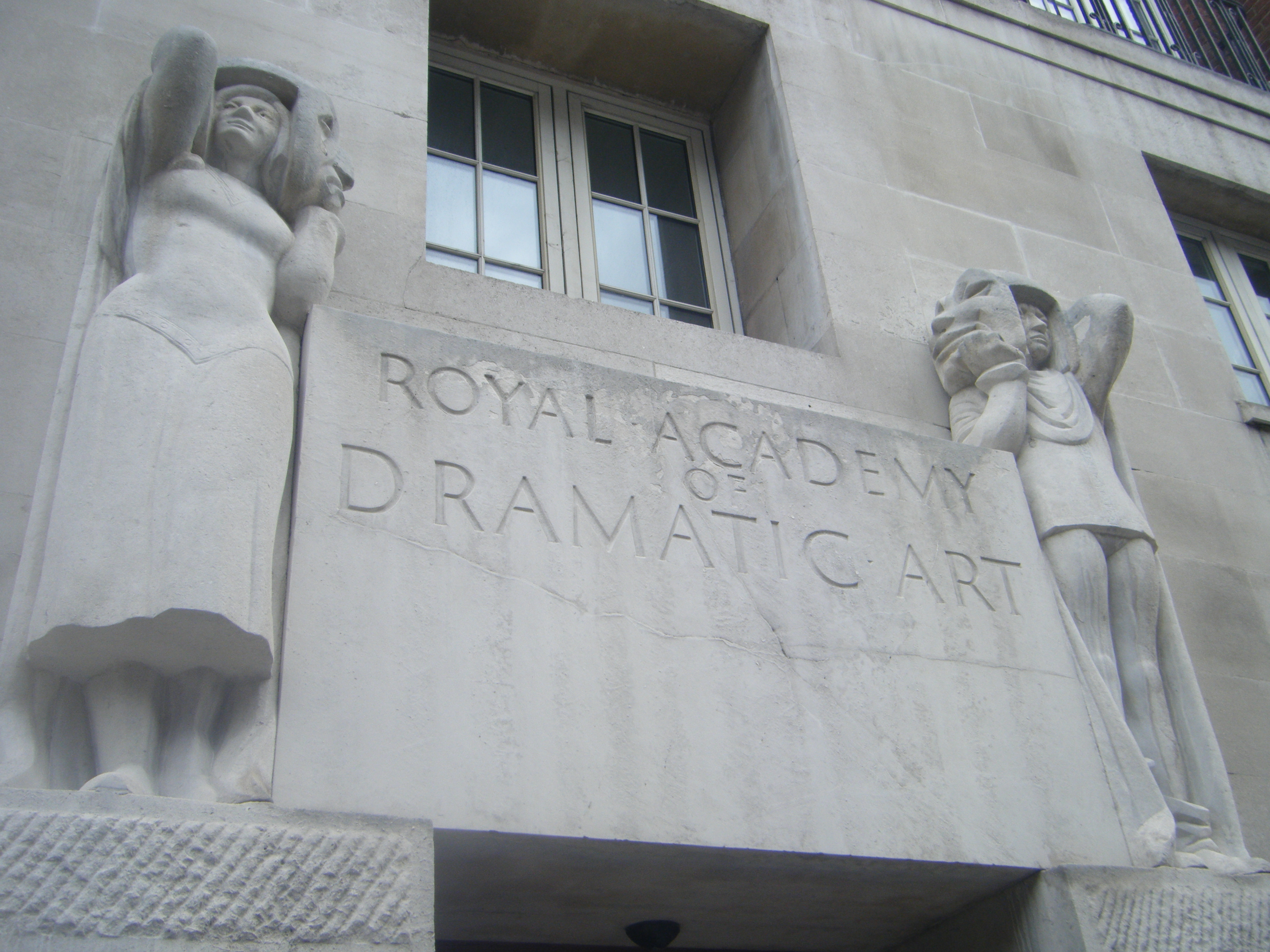
Rickman studied at the Royal Academy of Dramatic Art (RADA) in London from 1972 to 1974. He was elected to the RADA council in 1993, where he was also vice-chairman, a role he held until his death in 2016.

As a child, Rickman excelled at calligraphy and watercolour painting. Rickman was educated at West Acton First School followed by Derwentwater Primary School in Acton and then Latymer Upper School in London through the Direct Grant system, where he became involved in drama. Rickman later attended the Chelsea College of Art and Design from 1965 to 1968. He then attended the Royal College of Art from 1968 to 1970. His training allowed him to work as a graphic designer for the Royal College of Art's inhouse magazine, ARK, and the Notting Hill Herald, which he considered a more stable occupation than acting; he later said that drama school "wasn't considered the sensible thing to do at 18".

Following graduation, Rickman and several friends opened a graphic design studio called Graphiti, but after three years of successful business, he decided that he was going to pursue acting professionally. He wrote to request an audition with RADA, which he attended from 1972 until 1974. While there, he supported himself by working as a dresser for Nigel Hawthorne and Ralph Richardson.

== Career ==
=== 1974–1988: Theatre roles and film debut ===
After graduating from RADA, Rickman worked extensively with British repertory and experimental theatre groups. He first worked at the Library Theatre, Manchester in a 1974 production of Babes in the Wood. He then joined the company of the newly opened Haymarket Theatre, Leicester from 1974–1975, acting in productions of Romeo and Juliet, Joseph and the Amazing Technicolor Dreamcoat and Guys and Dolls. From there he moved to the Crucible Theatre, Sheffield in 1976 and then to Birmingham Repertory Theatre for 1976–1977. His repertory theatre productions included Chekhov's The Seagull and Snoo Wilson's The Grass Widow at the Royal Court Theatre; he also appeared three times at the Edinburgh International Festival. He performed with the Court Drama Group in 1978, gaining roles in Romeo and Juliet and A View from the Bridge, among other plays. While working with the Royal Shakespeare Company (RSC), he was cast as Jaques in As You Like It, contributing an essay about his process to the RSC's book Players of Shakespeare 2. He appeared in the 1981 BBC adaptation of Émile Zola's novel Thérèse Raquin, opposite Kate Nelligan and Brian Cox. He made a brief appearance in one episode of the BBC adaptation of John le Carré's Smiley's People (1982). His breakthrough role was in The Barchester Chronicles (1982), the BBC's adaptation of Trollope's first two Barchester novels, as the Reverend Obadiah Slope.

It shouldn't be a surprise that Alan Rickman is the only actor to make it onto this Greatest Villains list twice—he does bad deeds with such gusto. Legend has it he kept refusing the role of the Sheriff of Nottingham until it was agreed he could do whatever he liked with it—which, to Kevin Costner's rumoured chagrin, included stealing the whole damn show. Every sneer, every eye-roll, every flourish of splenetic exasperation is a joy to behold. Whether he's cancelling Christmas or cutting your heart out with a spoon, Rickman's crowd-pleasing pantomime villainy is downright heroic.

— Empire on Rickman, ranking his portrayals of the Sheriff of Nottingham (number 14) and Hans Gruber (number 4) on their list of the greatest villains.

Rickman was given the male lead, the Vicomte de Valmont, in the 1985 Royal Shakespeare Company production of Christopher Hampton's adaptation of Les Liaisons Dangereuses, directed by Howard Davies. After the RSC production transferred to the West End in 1986 and Broadway in 1987, Rickman received both a Tony Award nomination and a Drama Desk Award nomination for his performance. In 1988, Rickman played the antagonist Hans Gruber in the action thriller Die Hard in what was his first feature film. His portrayal, starring opposite Bruce Willis, earned him critical acclaim and a spot on the AFI's 100 Years...100 Heroes & Villains list as the 46th-best villain in film history. Rickman later revealed that he almost did not take the role, for he did not think Die Hard was the kind of film he wanted to make.

=== 1990–2000: Career breakthrough ===
In 1990, he played the Australian Elliott Marston opposite Tom Selleck in Quigley Down Under (1990). The following year, Rickman was cast as the Sheriff of Nottingham in Kevin Reynolds's film adaptation of Robin Hood: Prince of Thieves (1991). In the film, Rickman acted opposite Kevin Costner and Morgan Freeman. Entertainment Weekly proclaimed that while Robin Hood "left critics and movie goers underwhelmed, Rickman's gleefully wicked villain became the summer's most talked-about performance". For his performance he received the BAFTA Award for Best Actor in a Supporting Role. Upon winning the award Rickman stated, "This will be a healthy reminder to me that subtlety isn't everything". Despite gaining acclaim within the media for his ability to portray villainous roles in films Rickman took issue with being typecast as a villain. During this decade he would portray a range of characters that would defy media perceptions.

Rickman soon started to play leading roles such as Interrogator, in the enigmatic film Closet Land (1991) alongside Madeleine Stowe; and he also was the romantic role of Jamie in the independent romance film Truly, Madly, Deeply (1991) which earned him another BAFTA Award nomination. The film, directed by Anthony Minghella and starring Rickman and Juliet Stevenson, proved to be a critical success. Rickman was able to break out of the mould of the movie villain, with critic Roger Ebert noting, "The man is Rickman, who you will look at on the screen, and know you have seen somewhere, and rattle your memory all during the movie without making the connection that he was the villain in Die Hard." Rickman also starred in Stephen Poliakoff's Close My Eyes (1991) with Clive Owen and Saskia Reeves. Jonathan Rosenbaum of The Chicago Reader praised the film and all three lead performances, calling them "edgy, powerful, and wholly convincing, with Rickman a particular standout." All three of Rickman's performances in Close My Eyes, Truly Madly Deeply and Robin Hood: Prince of Thieves would win him the Evening Standard British Film Award for Best Actor, and the same performances along with his work in Quigley Down Under would also win him the London Film Critics' Circle Award for Actor of the Year.

In 1995, he starred in Mike Newell's coming-of-age film An Awfully Big Adventure. That same year, he was cast as Colonel Brandon in Sense and Sensibility, Ang Lee's film adaptation of Jane Austen's novel. The film also starred Emma Thompson, Hugh Grant, and Kate Winslet. Thompson noted that Rickman could express the "extraordinary sweetness [of] his nature," as he had played "Machiavellian types so effectively" in other films. For his performance, Rickman earned his third BAFTA Award for Best Actor in a Supporting Role nomination and his first Screen Actors Guild Award nomination. The following year he portrayed Éamon de Valera in the Neil Jordan period drama, Michael Collins starring Liam Neeson, Julia Roberts, and Stephen Rea. Rickman earned his fourth BAFTA Award nomination. In 1996, Rickman starred as the "mad monk" Rasputin in the HBO television biopic Rasputin: Dark Servant of Destiny, a role for which he won a Primetime Emmy Award for Outstanding Lead Actor in a Limited or Anthology Series or Movie, a Screen Actors Guild Award for Outstanding Performance by a Male Actor in a Miniseries or Television Movie, and a Golden Globe Award for Best Actor – Miniseries or Television Film.

Rickman directed The Winter Guest at London's Almeida Theatre in 1995 and the film version of the same play, released in 1997, starring Emma Thompson and her real-life mother Phyllida Law. Rickman's stage performances in the 1990s include Antony and Cleopatra in 1998 as Mark Antony, with Helen Mirren as Cleopatra, in the Royal National Theatre's production at the Olivier Theatre in London, which ran from October to December 1998. Rickman appeared in Victoria Wood with All the Trimmings (2000), a BBC One Christmas special with Victoria Wood, playing an aged colonel in the battle of Waterloo who is forced to break off his engagement to Honeysuckle Weeks' character.

During his career, Rickman played comedic roles, including as Alexander Dane/Dr. Lazarus in the cult classic sci-fi parody Galaxy Quest (1999) with Tim Allen, Sigourney Weaver, Sam Rockwell, and Tony Shalhoub. Rockwell said that Rickman "was very instrumental in making sure the script hit the dramatic notes, and everything had a strong logic and reason behind it". He also played the angel Metatron, the voice of God, in Kevin Smith's Dogma (also 1999).

=== 2001–2011: Harry Potter and acclaim ===
In 2001, he first appeared as Severus Snape, the potions master, in Harry Potter and the Philosopher's Stone. His portrayal of the role throughout the Harry Potter series (2001–2011) was dark, but the character's motivations were not clear early on. In 2002, Rickman performed onstage in Noël Coward's romantic comedy Private Lives. After its successful run at the Albery Theatre in the West End, it transferred to Broadway and ended in September 2002; he reunited with his Les Liaisons Dangereuses co-star Lindsay Duncan and director Howard Davies in the Olivier and Tony Award-winning production. Rickman also voiced the character of "King Philip" in the 2002 King of the Hill episode, "Joust Like a Woman".

In 2003, Rickman starred in the ensemble Christmas-themed romantic comedy Love Actually (2003) as Harry, the foolish husband of Emma Thompson's character. The film, written and directed by Richard Curtis, has been called "a modern classic" by The Independent. Rickman was nominated for a Primetime Emmy Award for his work as Dr. Alfred Blalock in HBO's Something the Lord Made (2004). In 2005, he lent his voice to Marvin the Paranoid Android in science fiction comedy The Hitchhiker's Guide to the Galaxy (2005) starring Martin Freeman, Mos Def, Sam Rockwell, and Zooey Deschanel.

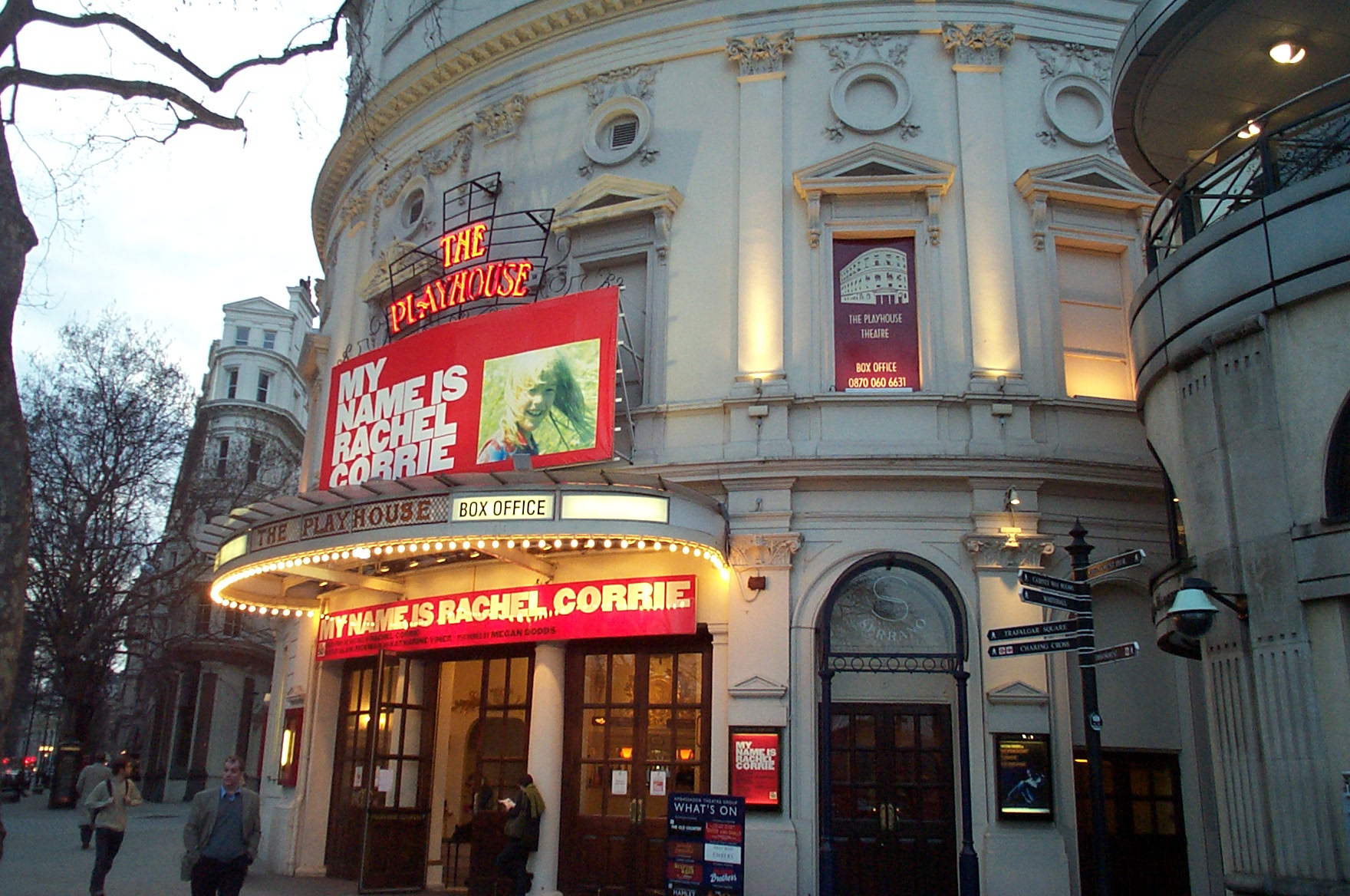
My Name Is Rachel Corrie—a play co-written and directed by Rickman—playing at the Playhouse Theatre, London, March 2006

In early 2005, My Name is Rachel Corrie, a play composed from Rachel Corrie's journals and emails from Gaza and compiled by Rickman and journalist Katharine Viner, in a production directed by Rickman, premiered at the Royal Court Theatre in London and was later revived in October 2005. The West End production saw Rickman win the Theatregoers' Choice Awards for Best Director. The play was to be transferred to the New York Theatre Workshop the following year, but when it was postponed indefinitely over the possibility of boycotts and protests from those who saw it as "anti-Israeli agit-prop", the British producers denounced the decision as censorship, and withdrew the show. Rickman called it "censorship born out of fear". Harold Pinter, Vanessa Redgrave and Tony Kushner among others, criticised the decision to indefinitely delay the show. The one-woman play finally opened off-Broadway on 15 October 2006 for an initial run of 48 performances. Despite the adverse reaction from pro-Israel groups, overall, the play was very popular, especially in London. "I never imagined that the play would create such acute controversy," Rickman said. He added, "Many Jews supported it. The New York producer was Jewish and we held a discussion after every performance. Both Israelis and Palestinians participated in the discussions and there was no shouting in the theatre. People simply listened to each other."

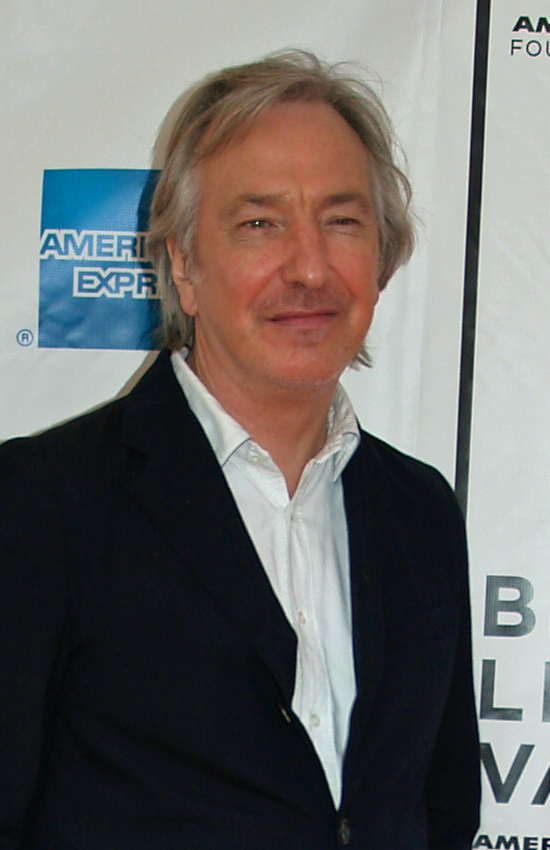
Rickman at the 2007 Tribeca Film Festival

He starred in the independent film Snow Cake (2006) with Sigourney Weaver and Carrie-Anne Moss, and Perfume: The Story of a Murderer (also 2006), directed by Tom Tykwer. He appeared as Judge Turpin in the critically acclaimed Tim Burton film Sweeney Todd: The Demon Barber of Fleet Street (2007) alongside Johnny Depp, and his Harry Potter co-stars Helena Bonham Carter and Timothy Spall. The same year he also played the egotistical, Nobel Prize-winning father in the black comedy Nobel Son (2007). Rickman starred in the 2008 movie Bottle Shock as a Paris-based wine expert named Steven Spurrier, who heads to Napa Valley California in search of worthy wines to bring back to France for the competition that year (based on a true story). In 2009, Rickman was awarded the James Joyce Award by University College Dublin's Literary and Historical Society. In October and November 2010, Rickman starred in the eponymous role in Henrik Ibsen's John Gabriel Borkman at the Abbey Theatre, Dublin alongside Lindsay Duncan and Fiona Shaw. The Irish Independent called Rickman's performance breathtaking. He reprised the role in a production at the Brooklyn Academy of Music.

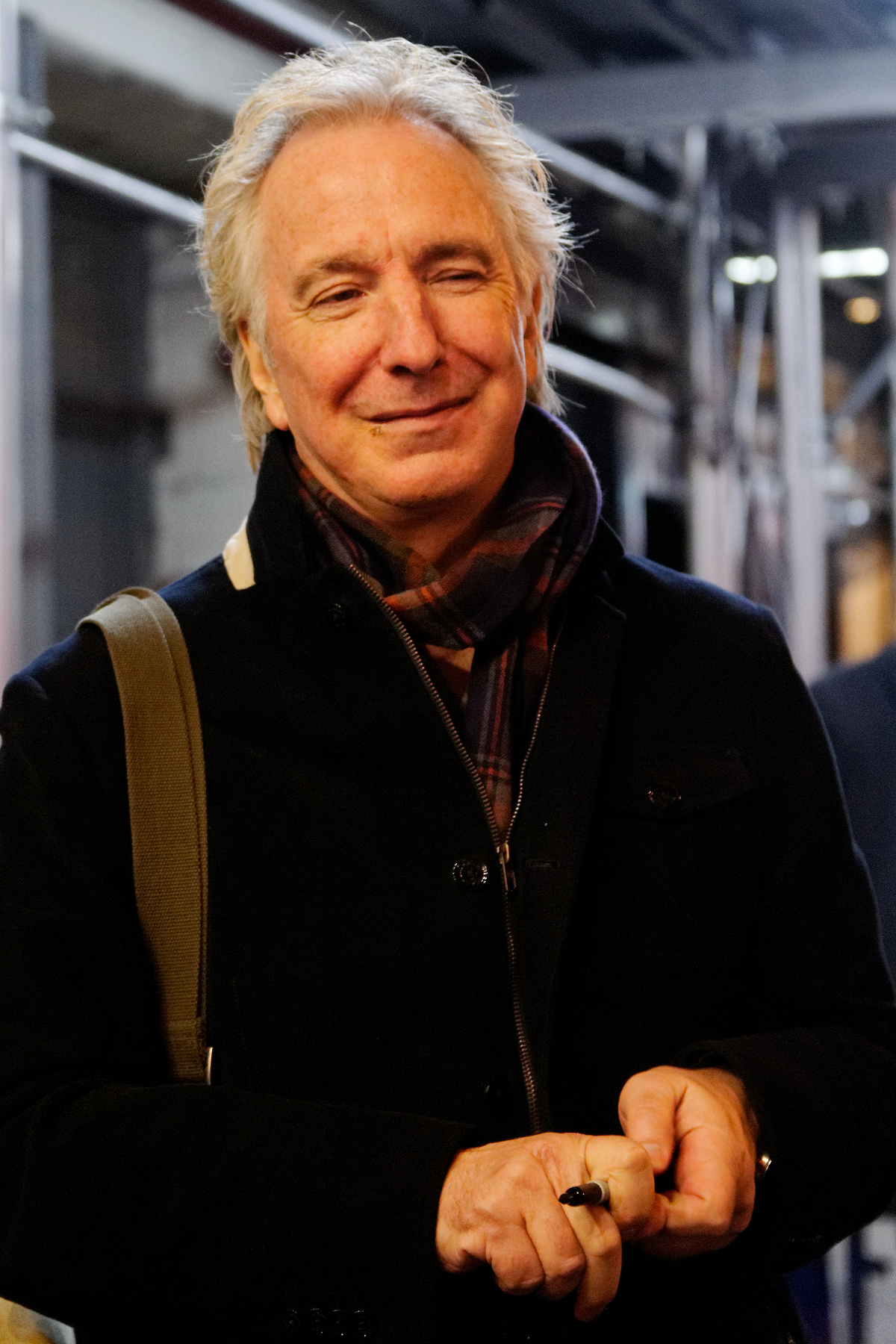
Rickman at the John Golden Theatre in 2011

In 2010, he starred in the BBC television production The Song of Lunch alongside Emma Thompson. That same year he provided the voice of Absolem the Caterpillar in Tim Burton's film Alice in Wonderland (2010). Rickman again appeared as Severus Snape in the final installment in the Harry Potter series, Harry Potter and the Deathly Hallows – Part 2 (2011). Throughout the series, his portrayal of Snape garnered widespread critical acclaim. Kenneth Turan of the Los Angeles Times said Rickman "as always, makes the most lasting impression", while Peter Travers of Rolling Stone magazine called Rickman "sublime at giving us a glimpse at last into the secret nurturing heart that ... Snape masks with a sneer." Media coverage characterised Rickman's performance as worthy of nomination for an Academy Award for Best Supporting Actor. His last appearance as Snape saw him receive award nominations in 2011, including at the Saturn Awards and the Scream Awards. In November 2011, Rickman opened in Seminar, a new play by Theresa Rebeck, at the John Golden Theatre on Broadway. Rickman, who left the production in April, won the Broadway.com Audience Choice Award for Favorite Actor in a Play and was nominated for a Drama League Award for Outstanding Distinguished Performance.

=== 2012–2016: Final roles ===
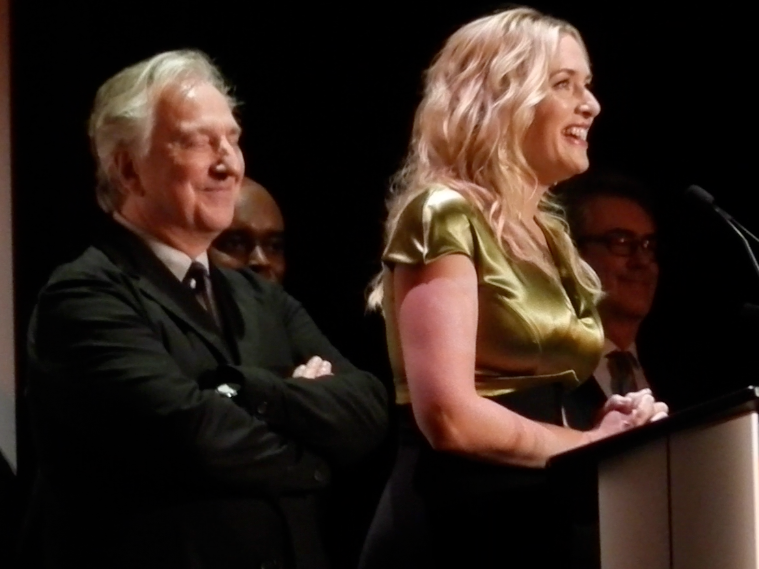
Rickman and Kate Winslet at the 2014 Toronto International Film Festival

Rickman starred with Colin Firth and Cameron Diaz in Gambit (2012) by Michael Hoffman, a remake of the 1966 film. In 2013, he portrayed Ronald Reagan in Lee Daniels' The Butler, and played Hilly Kristal, the founder of the East Village punk-rock club CBGB, in the CBGB film with Rupert Grint. In 2014, he directed and starred as King Louis XIV in the costume drama film A Little Chaos starring Kate Winslet, Matthias Schoenaerts, Jennifer Ehle, and Stanley Tucci. The film premiered at the Toronto International Film Festival. The film received mixed reviews with its critics' consensus reading, "Stylish and well-acted without ever living up to its dramatic potential, A Little Chaos is shouldered by the impressive efforts of a talented cast."

The following year he starred in Gavin Hood's Eye in the Sky (2015) starring Helen Mirren, Aaron Paul, and Barkhad Abdi. This would be Rickman's final onscreen performance. The film debuted at the 2015 Toronto International Film Festival to great acclaim, receiving a Rotten Tomatoes score of 95%, based on 175 critics, with the consensus being, "As taut as it is timely, Eye in the Sky offers a powerfully acted – and unusually cerebral – spin on the modern wartime political thriller." Critic Stephen Holden of The New York Times in particular praised his role, writing: "General Benson is Mr. Rickman's final screen performance, and it is a great one, suffused with a dyspeptic world-weary understanding of war and human nature".

== Reputation and technique ==
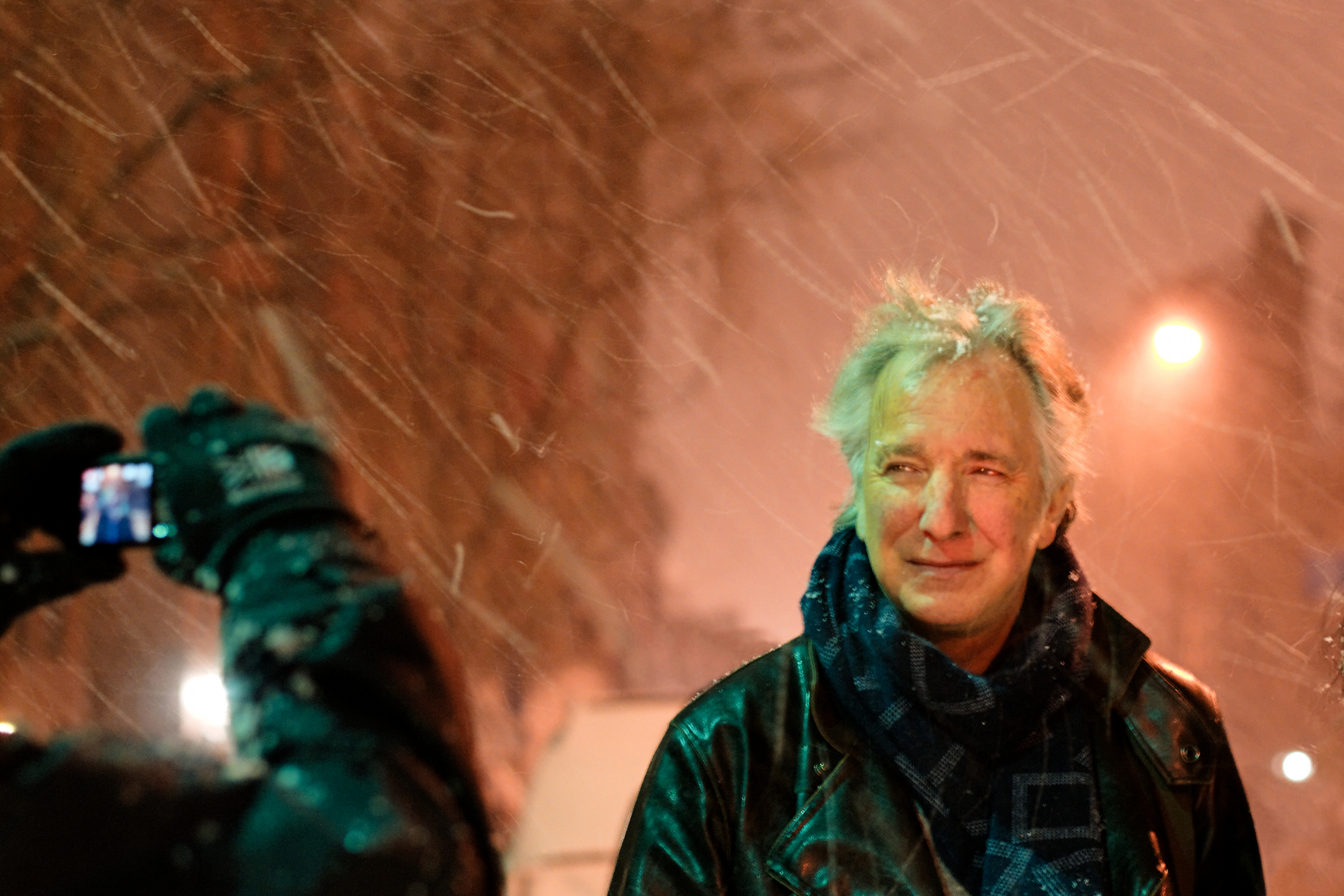
Rickman posing for a fan after a performance of John Gabriel Borkman in 2011

=== Public image ===
Rickman was chosen by Empire as one of the 100 Sexiest Stars in film history (No. 34) in 1995, and ranked No. 59 in Empire's "The Top 100 Movie Stars of All Time" list in October 1997. In 2009 and 2010, he was ranked once again as one of the 100 Sexiest Stars by Empire, both times placing No. 8 out of the 50 actors chosen. He was elected to the council of the Royal Academy of Dramatic Art (RADA) in 1993; he was subsequently RADA's vice-chairman and a member of its artistic advisory and training committees and development board.

Rickman was voted No. 19 in Empire magazine's Greatest Living Movie Stars over the age of 50 and was twice nominated for Broadway's Tony Award as Best Actor (Play); in 1987 for Les Liaisons Dangereuses and in 2002 for a revival of Noël Coward's Private Lives. The Guardian named Rickman as an "honourable mention" in a list of the best actors never to have received an Academy Award nomination.

=== On acting ===
In 2010, he was interviewed by BBC Hardtalk and explained "you only speak as a human being in life and therefore ...you only speak because you wish to respond to something you've heard". He believed the idea of merely recalling a speech to memory alone in a bedroom was nonsense in terms of learning to act.

Talking to ABC Radio National in 2012, Rickman revealed that the film which influenced and informed him was Robert Altman's 1975 film Nashville.

In an interview with Charlie Rose in 2012, Rose commented to Rickman that when playing anyone nasty, you have to find a vulnerability to which Rickman responded that he felt you couldn't judge a character you play or how could you play it. He went on to say that the characters have different wants and look at different means to gain them.

In an interview with NPR in 2013, he affirmed his earlier advice, saying "it would be that acting is about accurate listening."

=== Academia ===
Two researchers, a linguist and a sound engineer, found "the perfect [male] voice" to be a combination of Rickman's and Jeremy Irons' voices based on a sample of 50 voices. The BBC states that Rickman's "sonorous, languid voice was his calling card—making even throwaway lines of dialogue sound thought-out and authoritative." In their vocal range exercises in studying for a GCSE in drama, he was singled out by the BBC for his "excellent diction and articulation".

=== Pop culture ===
Rickman is featured in several musical works, including a song composed by Adam Leonard entitled "Not Alan Rickman". Credited as 'A Strolling Player' in the sleeve notes, the actor played a "Master of Ceremonies" part, announcing the various instruments at the end of the first part of Mike Oldfield's Tubular Bells II (1992) on the track "The Bell". Rickman was one of the many artists who recited Shakespearian sonnets on the album When Love Speaks (2002), and also featured prominently in a music video by Scottish rock band Texas entitled "In Demand", which premiered on MTV Europe in August 2000.

== Personal life ==
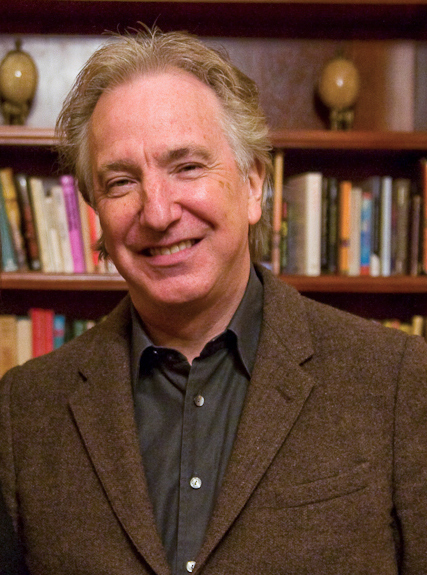
Rickman at a Hudson Union Society event in 2009

In 1965, when he was 19, Rickman met 18-year-old Rima Horton, who became his significant other in the early 1970s and would later be a Labour Party councillor on Kensington and Chelsea London Borough Council (1986–2006) and an economics lecturer at Kingston University in London. In 2015, Rickman confirmed that they had married in a private ceremony in New York City in 2012.

Rickman was the godfather of fellow actor Tom Burke. Rickman's brother Michael is a Conservative Party district councillor in Leicestershire.

Rickman was an active patron of the research foundation Saving Faces and honorary president of the International Performers' Aid Trust, a charity that works to fight poverty amongst performing artists all over the world.

When discussing politics, Rickman said he "was born a card-carrying member of the Labour Party". His last recorded work prior to his death was for a short video to help Oxford University students raise funds and awareness of the refugee crisis for Save the Children and Refugee Council. According to his diaries, Rickman declined a CBE in 2008.

Rickman was political until his last days. His last onscreen performance was with Helen Mirren in the drama Eye in the Sky, which he had described as "a film about the moral responsibilities governments face regarding the use of drones."

In 2003, after reading published emails by Rachel Corrie, a US activist who advocated for Palestinian rights and was crushed to death by an Israeli bulldozer in Gaza, he was motivated to produce My Name Is Rachel Corrie; the play was well-received and popular in London.

== Illnesses and death ==
Throughout 2005, Rickman received treatment for an aggressive form of prostate cancer, culminating in a prostatectomy in January 2006. The operation coincided with the casting for Harry Potter and the Order of the Phoenix, and he deliberated over whether to return to the series, but decided in favour, stating: "The argument that wins is the one that says: 'See it through. It's your story.'"

In August 2015, Rickman had a minor stroke, which led to the diagnosis of pancreatic cancer. On 14 January 2016, he died in a London hospital at the age of 69. His remains were cremated on 3 February in the West London Crematorium in Kensal Green. His ashes were given to his wife. His final two films, Eye in the Sky and Alice Through the Looking Glass, were dedicated to his memory, as was The Limehouse Golem, which would have been his next project.

== Acting credits and accolades ==
Rickman gained acclaim for his portrayal of Severus Snape in the Harry Potter series (2001–2011). He also appeared in numerous films including Die Hard (1988), Robin Hood: Prince of Thieves, Truly, Madly, Deeply (both 1991), An Awfully Big Adventure, Sense and Sensibility (both 1995), Michael Collins (1996), Dogma, Galaxy Quest (both 1999), Love Actually (2003), The Hitchhiker's Guide to the Galaxy (2005), Sweeney Todd: The Demon Barber of Fleet Street (2007), Alice in Wonderland (2010), and Eye in the Sky (2015).

He received numerous accolades including a BAFTA Award, a Primetime Emmy Award, a Golden Globe Award, and a Screen Actors Guild Award in addition to nominations for two Drama Desk Awards, a Drama League Award, a Laurence Olivier Award, and two Tony Awards.

== Legacy ==
Soon after his death, his fans created a memorial underneath the "Platform 9¾" sign at London King's Cross railway station. His death has been compared to that of David Bowie, a fellow British cultural figure who died at the same age as Rickman four days earlier; like Rickman, Bowie died of cancer and kept his cancer diagnosis from the public.

Tributes from Rickman's co-stars and contemporaries appeared on social media following the announcement. Since his cancer was not publicly known, some—like Ralph Fiennes, who "cannot believe he is gone", and Jason Isaacs, who was "sidestepped by the awful news"—expressed their surprise. Sir Michael Gambon told BBC Radio 4 he was a "great friend" and "a real man of the theatre and the stage". At a West End performance of the play that made him a star (Les Liaisons Dangereuses), he was remembered as "a great man of the British theatre".

Harry Potter creator J. K. Rowling called Rickman "a magnificent actor and a wonderful man." Emma Watson wrote, "I feel so lucky to have worked and spent time with such a special man and actor. I'll really miss our conversations." Daniel Radcliffe appreciated his loyalty and support: "I'm pretty sure he came and saw everything I ever did on stage both in Britain and America. He didn't have to do that." Evanna Lynch said it was scary to bump into Rickman in character as Snape, but "he was so kind and generous in the moments he wasn't Snaping about." Rupert Grint said, "even though he has gone I will always hear his voice." Johnny Depp, who co-starred with Rickman in two Tim Burton films, commented, "That voice, that persona. There's hardly anyone unique anymore. He was unique."

Kate Winslet, who gave a tearful tribute at the London Film Critics' Circle Awards, remembered Rickman as warm and generous, adding, "And that voice! Oh, that voice." Dame Helen Mirren said his voice "could suggest honey or a hidden stiletto blade". Emma Thompson remembered "the intransigence which made him the great artist he was—his ineffable and cynical wit, the clarity with which he saw most things, including me ... I learned a lot from him." Colin Firth told The Hollywood Reporter that, as an actor, Rickman had been a mentor. John McTiernan, director of Die Hard, said Rickman was the antithesis of the villainous roles for which he was most famous on screen. Sir Ian McKellen wrote, "behind [Rickman's] mournful face, which was just as beautiful when wracked with mirth, there was a super-active spirit, questing and achieving, a super-hero, unassuming but deadly effective." Writer/director Kevin Smith told a tearful 10-minute story about Rickman on his Hollywood Babble On podcast. Rickman's family offered their thanks "for the messages of condolence".

An edited collection of Rickman's diaries from 1993 to 2015 was published on 4 October 2022 under the title Madly, Deeply: The Alan Rickman Diaries.

On 30 April 2023, search engine Google commemorated Rickman with a Doodle.

On 13 November 2025, Rickman's personal scripts and mementoes went up for auction.

== See also ==
- List of British actors
- List of people who have declined a British honour
- List of Primetime Emmy Award winners
- List of Golden Globe winners
