= Zineb Oukach =

Moroccan actress and model

- زينب أوكاش
- Born: Casablanca, Morocco
- Citizenship: Morocco
- Occupation: Actress
- Years active: 2006–present

Zineb Oukach (Arabic: زينب أوكاش; /ˈziːnɛb ˈuːkəʃ/) is a Moroccan film actress and model, known to worldwide audiences for playing the role of Fatima in the 2007 Gavin Hood film Rendition.

== Early life ==
Oukach was born and raised in Casablanca, Morocco. In 2004 she moved to France, where she studied Economics before attending Cours Florent to focus on her acting career.

== Career ==
Already well known in Morocco for her work in Parfum de Mer, by acclaimed Moroccan film maker Abdelhai Laraki, and for her role in the Moroccan television series Une Famille Respectable by Kamal Kamal, in 2007 Oukach rose to international fame for her performance as the young Arab lead in the film Rendition alongside Meryl Streep, Jake Gyllenhaal and Reese Witherspoon. Oukach also played a role in The Wolf of Wall Street. And in the science fiction television series Alien Dawn, aired on Nickelodeon.

== Filmography ==
- Rendition - Fatima (2007)

(French title: Détention secrète)

- Parfum de Mer - Nadia (2006)

(English title: Scent of the Sea)

- The Wolf of Wall Street - hostess on yacht (2013)
- ’’Alien Dawn’’ - Stella
