= Guy Hibbert =

British screenwriter

- Born: Oxford, England
- Occupations: Screenwriter, film producer
- Spouse: Meifu Wang
- Children: 1 Grandchildren = 2

Guy Hibbert is a British screenwriter and playwright.

He has won four BAFTA TV awards, including Best Writer for the 2009 film Five Minutes of Heaven. This film was premiered at the 25th Sundance Film Festival, where Hibbert won the World Cinema Screenwriting Award.

Five Minutes of Heaven also won the Christopher Ewart-Biggs Memorial Prize, given for work promoting peace and reconciliation in Ireland.

His script for Eye In The Sky won Best Screenplay at Evening Standard British Film Awards 2017.

Hibbert started his writing career as a playwright. His play On The Edge was the winner of the John Whiting Award in 1985.

Other awards include the Mental Health Media Award in 1998 and in 2004 and the Joan Coleman Award in 2013 for his contribution to the understanding of mental health.

Hibbert lives in London with his wife, poet and translator Meifu Wang. He has one daughter, Celeste Hibbert, and two granddaughters.

== Filmography ==
- Master of the Marionettes (1989) writer
- Aimee (1991) – writer
- Bad Girl (1992) – writer
- Nice Town (1992) – writer
- Saigon Baby (1995) – writer
- Prime Suspect - "Scent of Darkness" (1997) – writer
- No Child Of Mine (1997) – writer
- Shot Through the Heart (1998) – writer
- The Russian Bride (2001) - writer and executive producer
- May 33rd (2004) – writer and executive producer
- Omagh (2004) – co-writer with Paul Greengrass
- Who Gets the Dog? (2007) – writer
- Five Minutes of Heaven (2009) – writer
- Blood and Oil (2010) – writer
- Complicit (2013) – writer and executive producer
- One Child (2014) - writer and executive producer
- Eye in the Sky (2015) – writer and executive producer
- A United Kingdom (2016) - writer and executive producer
