= Tsotsi (novel) =

1980 Athol Fugard novel

- 1st edition, Donker 1980
- Author: Athol Fugard
- Language: English
- Published: Johannesburg, South Africa
- Publisher: Donker
- Publication place: South Africa

Tsotsi is the only novel written by South African playwright Athol Fugard (1932–2025). It was published in 1980 although written some time earlier, and it was the basis of the 2005 film of the same name. It has been republished in several editions including in 2019 by Canongate (ISBN 978-1786896155).

In 2022 it was selected as one of the 70 books in the Big Jubilee Read, a celebration of writing by Commonwealth writers for the Platinum Jubilee of Elizabeth II.
