= The Bird Can't Fly =

The Bird Can’t Fly
- Directed by: Threes Anna
- Written by: Threes Anna; Philip Roberts
- Produced by: Threes Anna; Bous De Jong; Tom Maguire; Joel Phiri; Anton Scholten
- Starring: Barbara Hershey
- Cinematography: Guido van Gennep
- Edited by: Wouter Jansen
- Music by: Paul Hepker; Mark Kilian
- Release date: 12 May 2007 (Cannes)
- Running time: 89 minutes
- Countries: South Africa; Ireland; Netherlands
- Language: English

The Bird Can't Fly is a 2007 Dutch-South African-Irish drama film directed by Threes Anna and starring Barbara Hershey.

== Cast ==
- Barbara Hershey as Melody
- Yusuf Davids as River
- Tony Kgoroge as Scoop
- John Kani as Stone
- Kira Wilkinson as Grace
- Amanda Dilma as Pretty
- Tina Jaxa as Mercy
- Thoko Ntshinga as Fair
- Claire Berlein as Charm
- Dipuo Huma as Belle
- Hazel Scott as Mrs. Grain
- Bill Curry as Postman
