= A Reasonable Man =

- Directed by: Gavin Hood
- Written by: Gavin Hood
- Produced by: Gavin Hood; Paul Raleigh
- Starring: Gavin Hood; Nigel Hawthorne; Janine Eser
- Cinematography: Buster Reynolds
- Edited by: Avril Beukes
- Music by: Neill Solomon
- Production company: African Media Entertainment
- Distributed by: Pandora Cinema
- Release dates: 13 August 1999 (South Africa); 15 October 1999 (Chicago)
- Running time: 103 minutes
- Countries: South Africa; France
- Language: English
- Budget: $61,000
- Box office: $45,000 (South Africa)

A Reasonable Man is a 1999 South African-French thriller crime drama film produced, written, starring, and directed by Gavin Hood.

== Premise ==
Sean Raine, an ex-army officer with issues of his own, defends an impoverished young cowherd of killing a baby that he believes is an evil being known as a Tikoloshe.

== Cast ==
- Gavin Hood as Sean Raine
- Nigel Hawthorne as Judge Wendon
- Janine Eser as Jennifer Raine
- Vusi Kunene as Prosecutor Linde
- Ken Gampu as Headman
- Loyiso Gxwala as Sipho Mbombela
- Nandi Nyembe as Sangoma Rachel Ndlovu
- Ian Roberts as Chris Van Rooyen
- Graham Hopkins as Professor MacKenzie
- Rapulana Seiphemo as Joe Zuma
- Keketso Semoko as Mary Majola
- Thembi Nyandeni as Miriam Mbombela
- Duma Mnembe as Village Sangoma
- Amanda Dakada as Mary's sick daughter
- Ayanda Ncube as Thandi Mbombela
