= Rima Horton =

English former councillor and economics lecturer (born 1947)

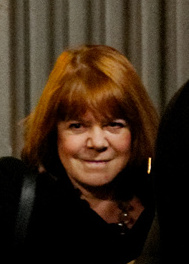

Member of the Kensington and Chelsea London Borough Council for St Charles
- In office May 1986 – 4 May 2006

Personal details
- Born: Rima Elizabeth Horton; 31 January 1947 (age 79) London, England
- Party: Labour
- Spouse: Alan Rickman (m. 2012; died 2016)
- Education: University of Southampton
- Occupation: Lecturer

Rima Elizabeth Horton (born 31 January 1947) is an English former academic and Labour Party politician. She was a member of the Kensington and Chelsea London Borough Council from 1986 to 2006, and worked as a senior lecturer at Kingston University until retirement.

== Early life ==
Rima Elizabeth Horton was born in the Bayswater neighbourhood of London, the third of four children of Elice Irene (née Frame) and Wilfred Stewart Horton. Her mother was from Wales while her father was London-born. Horton attended the private, co-educational St. Vincent's primary school, City of London School for Girls and later the University of Southampton. She performed in theatre at school and then in several amateur groups, such as the Brook Drama Club which took her to Paris in 1962 when she was only 15. Fellow members reported that she already had a strong presence and a real talent for directing the group. At 18, she won the Most Promising Youngster Award at the Southall Music & Drama Festival, where young Alan Rickman acted beside her.

== Career ==
Horton won election as a Labour Party councillor on the Kensington and Chelsea London Borough Council in 1986, serving as its Chief Whip and a spokesperson on education during her tenure. She lost her place on the council in May 2006, as "part of the national shift" (in which there was a swing against Labour, who had been in government nationally for nine years by that point). She stood twice as a Labour candidate for Parliament, losing to the Conservative candidate both times. Horton also worked as a senior economics lecturer at Kingston University in London. She retired in 2012.

Horton served on the board of directors of The Making Place, a children's charity. She was appointed in 2002 and stepped down in 2005. She has also served on the board of trustees of the Gate Theatre in Notting Hill.

== Writing ==
Horton was a contributor to The Elgar Companion to Radical Political Economy in 1994, penning a piece titled "Inequality". In it, she posed three questions: whether people are "naturally equal in essence"; whether and when the redistribution of wealth is justified; and, if so, how much is "fair"? She cited "much recent work" suggesting that health status and mortality rates in developed countries "actually depends on the distribution of income".

== Personal life ==
Horton met aspiring actor Alan Rickman in 1965, when they both were in an amateur theatre group at Chelsea College of Arts he was attending. She was 18 and he was 19. They became partners in the early 1970s and began living together in 1977. They were married in a private ceremony in New York City in 2012. Their marriage was announced publicly three years afterwards, in 2015. Horton lived with Rickman until his death in January 2016.
