= Paul Hepker =

South African composer

Paul Hepker (born in Harare, Zimbabwe on 17 December 1967) is a South African composer, musical director, pianist, best known for composing the score (with Mark Kilian) for the film Tsotsi, which won the Academy Award for Foreign Language Film at the 78th Academy Awards in 2005. Hepker and Kilian also wrote the score for Rendition, the Gavin Hood film starring Jake Gyllenhaal, Reese Witherspoon and Meryl Streep amongst others. Hepker and Kilian also co-composed the score for "The Bird Can’t Fly" by Dutch director Threes Anna. Hepker wrote the music for the AIDs documentary "Into the Light" which featured the voice of Kenyan artist Ayub Ogada.

In the 1990s Hepker toured extensively as pianist/keyboardist with Shirley Bassey, Johnny Clegg and many talented South African artists including Vusi Mahlasela, Vicky Sampson, MarcAlex and Yvonne Chaka Chaka.

A classically trained pianist (taught by Adolph Hallis) and multi-instrumentalist, Hepker lived and worked in South Africa as a musical director and composer – doing jingles, musicals and TV shows when not off touring the world. He was a successful musical director of stage productions of Joseph and his Technicolor Dreamcoat for PACT at the State Theatre in Pretoria and The Theatre on the Track in Kyalami, where he also co-devised and musically directed Heaven Can't Wait and California Dreamin'. In the mid-1990s he had a pop duo called 'zelig' (with dyna-mite vocalist Gabriel).

Paul moved to Hollywood in 1997, where he now writes for film, TV and stage. Hepker has composed the music for numerous Discovery Channel series – including the wildly popular Alaskan crab-fishing shows: "Deadliest Catch" and "Deadliest Season". Other series include "Impact", "Crash Files", "Frontline Firefighters", "Iditarod", "Raw Nature" and "Shark U".
