= Tsotsi =

2005 film directed by Gavin Hood

- Theatrical release poster
- Directed by: Gavin Hood
- Screenplay by: Gavin Hood
- Based on: Tsotsi by Athol Fugard
- Produced by: Peter Fudakowski
- Starring: Presley Chweneyagae
- Cinematography: Lance Gewer
- Edited by: Megan Gill
- Music by: Vusi Mahlasela; Mark Kilian; Paul Hepker
- Production companies: The UK Film & TV Production Company PLC; Industrial Development Corporation of South Africa; The National Film and Video Foundation of SA; Moviworld; Tsotsi Films
- Distributed by: Ster-Kinekor Pictures (South Africa); Momentum Pictures (United Kingdom)
- Release dates: 18 August 2005 (Edinburgh Film Festival); 23 December 2005 (South Africa)
- Running time: 95 minutes
- Countries: South Africa; United Kingdom
- Languages: Setswana; Zulu; Sesotho; Afrikaans; English
- Budget: $3 million
- Box office: $11.5 million

Tsotsi is a 2005 crime drama film written and directed by Gavin Hood and produced by Peter Fudakowski. It is an adaptation of the novel Tsotsi by Athol Fugard, and is a South African/UK co-production. Set in the Alexandra slum in Johannesburg, South Africa, it stars Presley Chweneyagae as David/Tsotsi (meaning "criminal" - see also Tsotsitaal), a young street thug who steals a car only to discover a baby in the back seat. It also features Kenneth Nkosi, Jerry Mofokeng, and Rapulana Seiphemo in supporting roles.

The soundtrack features Kwaito music performed by South African artist Zola and Afro-pop group Mafikizolo, as well as a score by Mark Kilian and Paul Hepker with the voice of South African protest singer and poet Vusi Mahlasela.

The film was praised, particularly for its writing, direction, and performances, especially Chweneyagae's and Pheto's, cinematography and for emotional weight. It went on to win the 2006 Academy Award for Best International Feature Film and was nominated for the Golden Globe for Best Foreign Language Film, becoming the first South African film and first African film not made in French to win the former. In 2009, it was unofficially remade in Tamil as Yogi.

== Plot ==
As his mother is dying of disease, David runs away from an abusive father and lives with other homeless children in a series of large concrete construction pipes. A few years later, David, who now goes by Tsotsi, is the leader of a gang that includes his friends Butcher, Aap, and Boston.

After getting involved in a murder committed by Butcher during a mugging, Tsotsi and Boston get into a fight that leaves Boston badly injured. Tsotsi later shoots Pumla, a young woman, while stealing her car, only to discover a three-month-old baby in the back seat. Tsotsi hastily strips the car of its valuables and takes the baby back to his shack. Pumla survives the attack (although she is rendered unable to walk) and works with a police artist to create a composite sketch of Tsotsi's face, which is then run in the newspapers.

Realising that he cannot properly care for the baby on his own, Tsotsi spots Miriam with a young child strapped to her back, collecting water from a public tap. He follows her to her shack and forces her at gunpoint to feed the kidnapped child. Meanwhile, rich gang leader Fela begins attempting to recruit Aap, Boston, and Butcher to work for him. When Tsotsi takes the child to Miriam a second time, she asks him to leave the boy with her so that she can care for him on Tsotsi's behalf, and Tsotsi agrees.

Tsotsi decides to take care of the injured Boston and has Aap and Butcher take Boston to his shack. Boston, who is called Teacher Boy by his friends, explains that he never took the teachers' examination. Tsotsi tells him that the gang will raise the money so that Boston can take the exam, which means that they will have to commit another robbery.

Tsotsi and Aap go to Pumla's house. When Pumla's husband John returns from the hospital, they follow him into the house and tie him up. Aap is assigned to watch John while Butcher ransacks the bedroom and Tsotsi collects items from the baby's room.

When Aap goes to raid the fridge, John activates the alarm. In a panic, Butcher attempts to kill John with John's pistol that he found. Tsotsi shoots and kills Butcher with his pistol. He and Aap escape in John's car moments before the security company arrives.

Traumatised by Tsotsi's killing of Butcher and fearing that Tsotsi will one day harm him too, Aap decides to leave the gang. When Tsotsi goes back to Miriam's house, she reveals that she knows where he got the baby, and begs him to return the child to his parents.

Tsotsi sets off to return the baby. He reaches John's house and tells John over the intercom that he will leave the child outside the gate. Meanwhile, an officer stationed at the house alerts Captain Smit, who rushes to the scene, arriving just as Tsotsi is about to walk away.

The police train their guns on Tsotsi, ordering him to return the baby. However, John urges them to lower their weapons so that he can retrieve the baby himself. As Tsotsi holds the baby in his arms, John convinces him to give up the baby. Tsotsi emotionally hands the baby to John, then is told to put up his hands and turns himself in as the film ends.

=== Alternate endings ===
The film ends with Tsotsi raising his hands and does not disclose what happens thereafter. Two unused endings were shot for the film, which can be seen on the Tsotsi DVD. In one, the baby cries and Tsotsi is shot in the shoulder while reaching for a milk bottle he brought, and while the officers are shocked at what happened, he escapes through a large field back to the Alexandra slums after avoiding another shot from the chief police officer. In the other, the baby cries and Tsotsi is shot in the chest while reaching for the milk bottle. He collapses and dies while John and Pumla look on in horror.

== Cast ==
- Presley Chweneyagae as David / Tsotsi: The anti-heroic leader of a gang of small-time thugs. His name, in Tsotsitaal, means "thug" or "criminal".
- Mothusi Magano as Boston / Teacher boy: A member of Tsotsi's gang and a heavy drinker, Boston was studying to be a teacher before he quit college and moved to the shacks. He frequently pleads for decency and moderation in the gang's dealings.
- Kenneth Nkosi as Aap: Tsotsi's childhood friend. Aap is obedient and happy-go-lucky, and relies on Tsotsi heavily, rarely thinking for himself. His name, in Afrikaans and Tsotsitaal, means "monkey".
- Zenzo Ngqobe as Butcher: The fourth member of Tsotsi's gang, and the most violent, Butcher is a cheat and a loose cannon who does not hesitate to commit murder.
- Jerry Mofokeng as Morris: A beggar who worked in the gold mines until he was permanently crippled when a beam fell on his legs.
- Terry Pheto as Miriam: A widow with a young son who lives near Tsotsi in the slum.
- Nambitha Mpumlwana as Pumla Dube: The mother of the kidnapped child.
- Rapulana Seiphemo as John Dube: The father of the kidnapped child.
- Ian Roberts as Captain Smit: An Afrikaner police captain.
- Thembi Nyandeni as Soekie: Owner of the criminals' local bar.
- Israel Makoe as Tsotsi's father
- Honour Zuma as the Baby
- Zola 7

== Reception ==
=== Box office ===
The film opened in a limited release in North America on 24 February 2006 in 6 theatres and ultimately was shown in 122 theatres for a lifetime worldwide gross of $11.54 million.

=== Critical response ===
The film received positive reviews from critics and has a score of 82% on Rotten Tomatoes based on 131 reviews with an average score of 7.41 out of 10. The critical consensus states: "Chweneyagae's powerful performance carries this simple yet searing tale of a shantytown teenager's redemption." The film also has a score of 70 out of 100 on Metacritic based on 35 critics.

Roger Ebert gave the film a four out of four rating and stated:

How strange, a movie where a bad man becomes better, instead of the other way around. Tsotsi, a film of deep emotional power, considers a young killer whose cold eyes show no emotion, who kills unthinkingly, and who is transformed by the helplessness of a baby. He didn't mean to kidnap the baby, but now that he has it, it looks at him with trust and need, and he is powerless before eyes more demanding than his own. [...] How the story develops is for you to discover. I was surprised to find that it leads toward hope instead of despair; why does fiction so often assume defeat is our destiny?

Tsotsi won the 2006 Academy Award for Best Foreign Language Film and was nominated for the Golden Globe for Best Foreign Language Film in 2006.

Gavin Hood was also nominated for the 2005 Non-European Film – Prix Screen International at the European Film Awards for his work on the film.

== Soundtrack ==
Tsotsi

Soundtrack album by Various Artists
- Released: 16 February 2006
- Genres: Kwaito; Hip hop Afro-pop
- Length: 1:08:15
- Label: Milan Entertainment
- Producer: Emmanuel Chamboredon

No.	Title	Writer(s)	Performed by	Length
1.	"Mdlwembe"	Kabelo "Kaybee" Ikaneng	Zola	4:17
2.	"Bhambatha"	Thabiso Tsotetsi	Zola	4:22
3.	"Zingu 7"	Kabelo "Kaybee" Ikaneng	Zola	2:43
4.	"Matofotofo"	Composed by Cleopas Monyepao, Lyrics by T. Ngeobo, S. Msimanga	Pitch Black Afro featuring Bravo	4:52
5.	"Sgubhu Sam"	Unathi	Unathi	4:10
6.	"Munt'Omnyama"	Lyrics by T. Kgosinkwe, Additional Lyrics by T. Seate, A. Muphemi	Mafikizolo featuring Stoan & Jahseed from Bongo Maffin	4:31
7.	"Palesa"	Thabiso Tsotetsi	Zola	3:59
8.	"Seven"	Kabelo "Kaybee" Ikaneng	Zola	4:09
9.	"Ehlala"	Lyrics by Bonginkosi "Zola" Dlamini, Composed by Thabiso Tsotetsi, Cleopas Monyepao	Zola	4:37
10.	"C.R.A.Z.Y"	Bongani Fassie, 37 MPH	Ishmael featuring Bongz	4:10
11.	"It's Your Life"	Bonginkosi "Zola" Dlamini, Thabiso Tsotetsi, Cleopas Monyepao	Zola	4:57
12.	"Woof Woof"	Kabelo "Kaybee" Ikaneng	Zola	3:18
13.	"Stolen Legs"	Mark Kilian, Paul Hepker	Mark Kilian and Paul Hepker featuring Vusi Mahlasela	0:59
14.	"On The Tracks"	Mark Kilian, Paul Hepker	Mark Kilian and Paul Hepker featuring Vusi Mahlasela	1:11
15.	"Silang Mabele"	Vusi Mahlasela	Vusi Mahlasela	5:38
16.	"Bye Bye Baby"	Mark Kilian, Paul Hepker	Mark Kilian and Paul Hepker featuring Vusi Mahlasela	1:52
17.	"Baby Handover"	Mark Kilian, Paul Hepker	Mark Kilian and Paul Hepker featuring Vusi Mahlasela	1:59
18.	"E Sale Noka"	Mark Kilian, Paul Hepker, Vusi Mahlasela	Vusi Mahlasela and the A-Team	1:53
19.	"Ghetto Scandalous"	Bonginkosi "Zola" Dlamini, Amu, Kabelo "Kaybee" Ikaneng	Zola	4:46
Total length:				1:08:15

== See also ==
- List of South African films
- Cinema of South Africa
