= Oerol Festival =

Annual cultural festival in the Netherlands

Coordinates: 53.3761°N 5.2496°E

Oerol
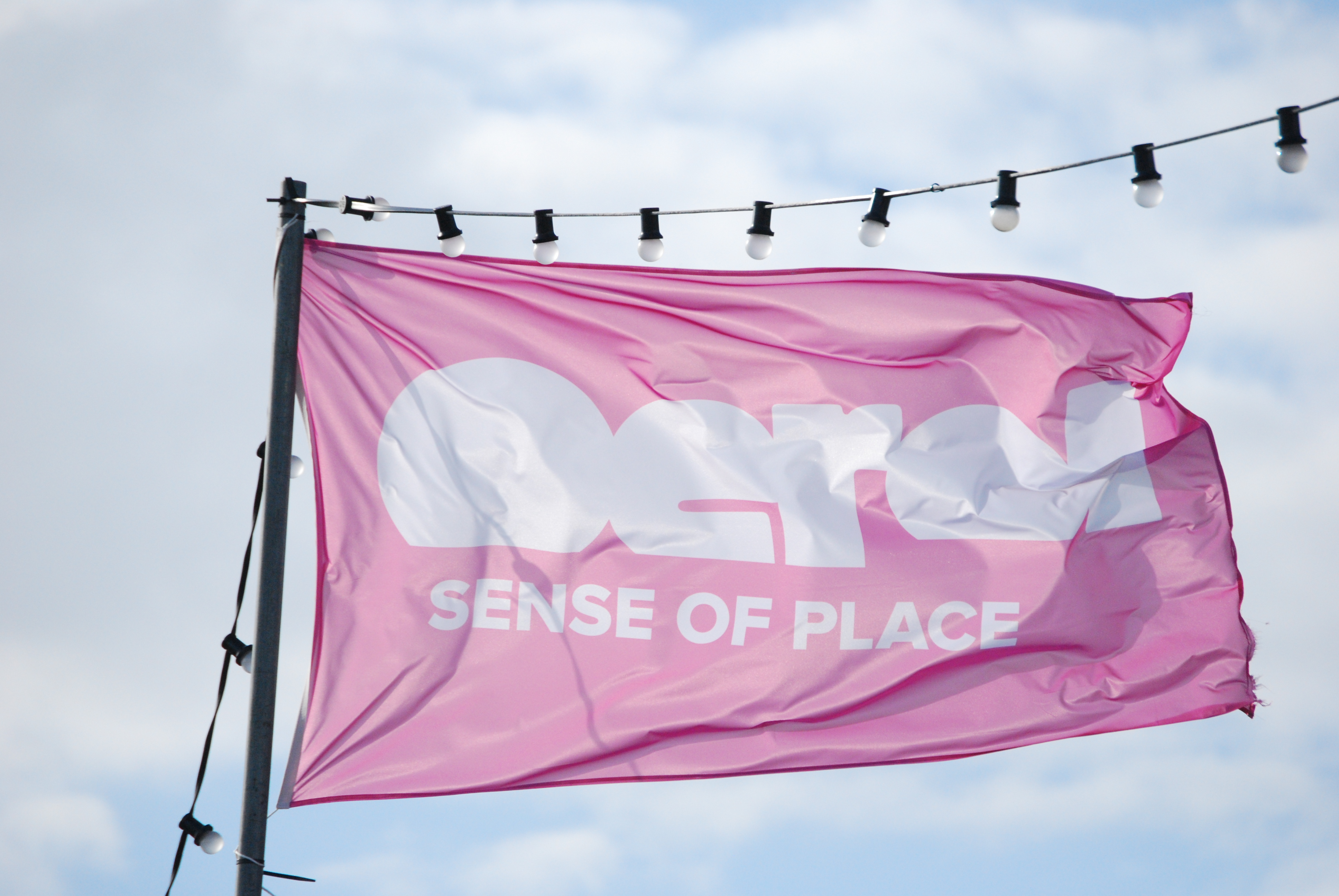
- Status: Active
- Genre: Theatre, music, and visual arts
- Date: June
- Frequency: Annually
- Locations: Terschelling, Netherlands
- Website: www.oerol.nl/en/

Oerol (Dutch pronunciation: [ˈuːrɔl]) is a cultural festival on the island of Terschelling in the Netherlands that is held annually in June. The ten-day festival is focused on live, public theatre as well as music and visual arts. This festival was founded in 1981 by Joop Mulder, then owner of café De Stoep in Midsland. The first edition took place on June 18, 1982.

== Festival ==
Oerol has grown into one of the largest location theater festivals in Europe, Oerol is programmed at the beginning of the summer. Around 55,000 visitors come to the festival each year.

The premise of the Festival is to use the entire island as a stage, although two primary stages (Groene Strand and Westerkeyn) are set up. Beaches, woods, dunes and other landscapes can function as performance spaces, and shows have also taken place in farm sheds, boathouses and an army bunker. Tickets are sold in the form of "passports" allowing access to the island for part or all of the week, and then tickets are available for the individual performances. Street theatre acts, art, and podium musical performances are free during the festival. Over 50,000 people visited the island and some 95,000 tickets were sold for the 2007 festival.

Due to the COVID-19 pandemic, the physical Festivals of 2020 and 2021 were cancelled. An 'Imagine Your Island' fucntioned as an alternate online event.

== Naming ==
In the Terschelling dialect, Oerol means "everywhere" or literally "overall" in the sense of covering the entire land (oeral in standard Frisian). Oerol takes its name from an old Terschelling tradition, when for a short time in early spring cattle were allowed to roam freely on the island, grazing on any and all available greenery. The oerol tradition continued until the arrival of paved roads, since cars and bicyclists collided at night with sleeping cattle; it was finally ended during the German occupation of the island in World War II.

== Funding ==
Over the years, the Festival faced financial difficulties several times. In the 1993, Festival director Mulder announced during the opening that negotiations with the Ministry of WVC and the provincial government of Friesland had failed, and that this time the Festival would be held for the last time. Believing it to be the last time, visitors left the island disappointed. However, a solution was found shortly thereafter.

On the final day of Oerol in 2004 Mulder again announced that the continued existence of the Festival was threatened. Although a record number of visitors (55,000) had come, the organization was once again in financial difficulty. The subsidy of € 180,000 was not enough to continue to organize and finance the festival in the following years. "We want at least € 400,000, otherwise it won't happen next year," Mulder said on the closing day of the 23rd Oerol edition. In 2005, structural support for the festival was actually extended and the 24th edition was secured.

Since 2017, Oerol has a solid position in the system and is part of the Basic Infrastructure (BIS) with a modest structural subsidy. Thanks to the extra subsidies during the COVID-19 pandemic, Oerol was not in financial jeopardy and staff and creators were still able to claim (part of) the agreed fees.

== Death of Joop Mulder ==
On 10 January 2021, Joop Mulder, the Festival's founder, died at the age of 67.

As a tribute to Mulder, Marc van Vliet's artwork De Streken will be placed in the Wadden Sea during the summer in the coming years with the help of private donations. On the other side of the Wadden Sea, Sense of Place has placed a bench, titled "whatdataangaat". This is a famous quote by Mulder.

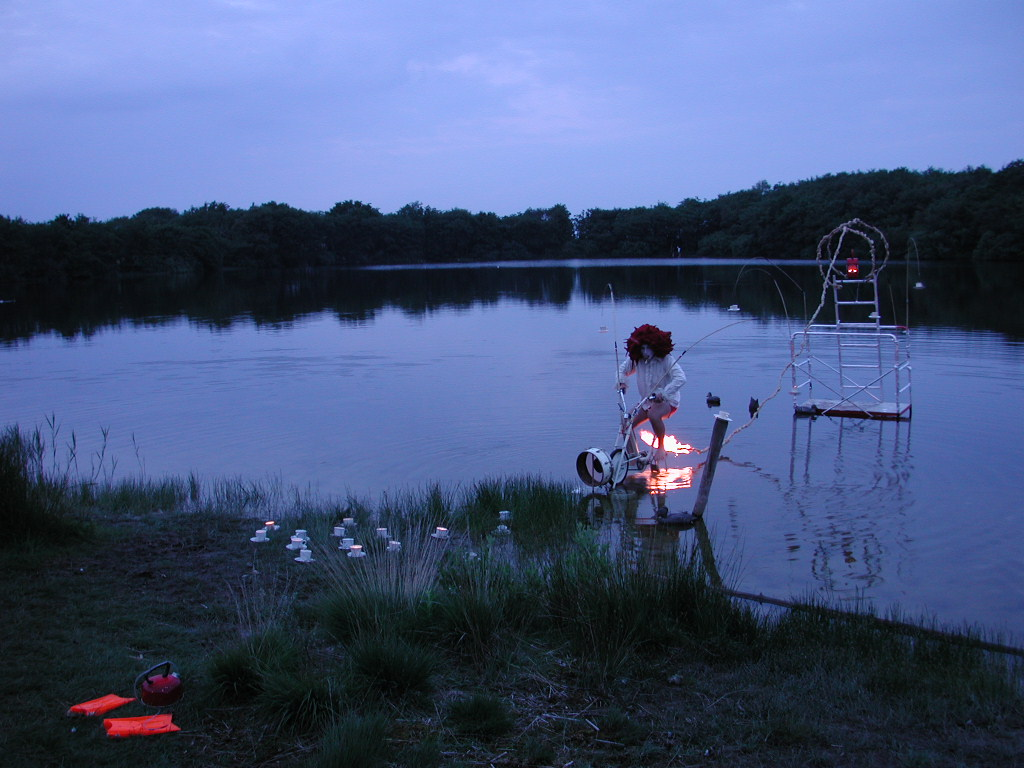
Performance in 2001

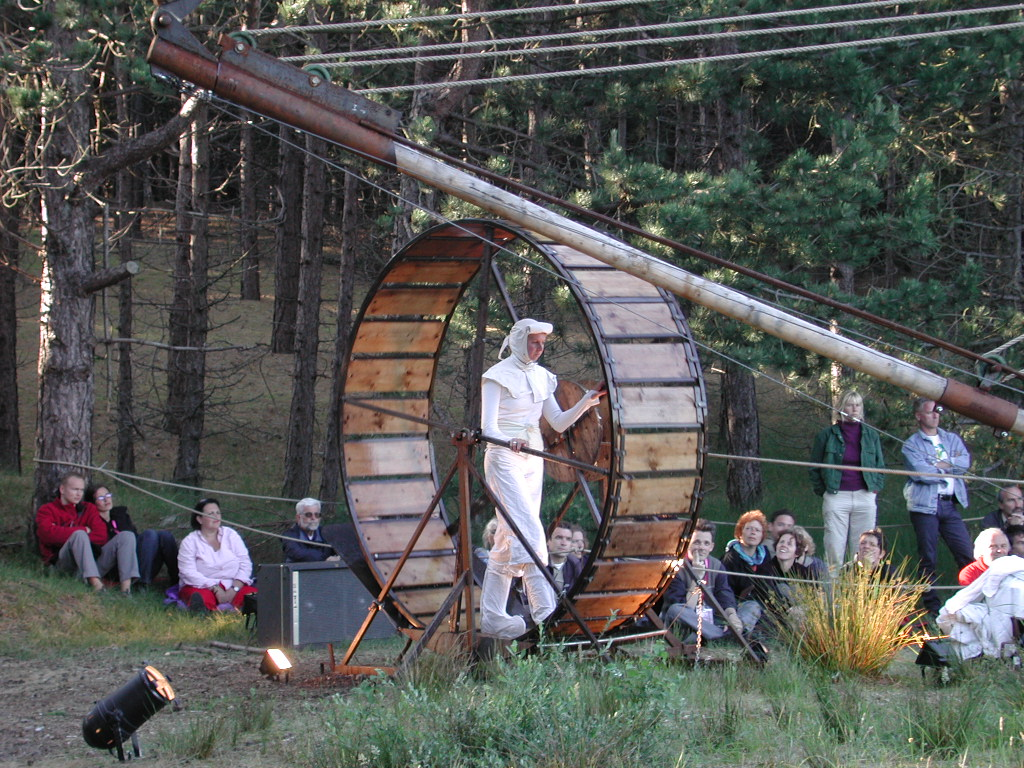
Performance in 2002

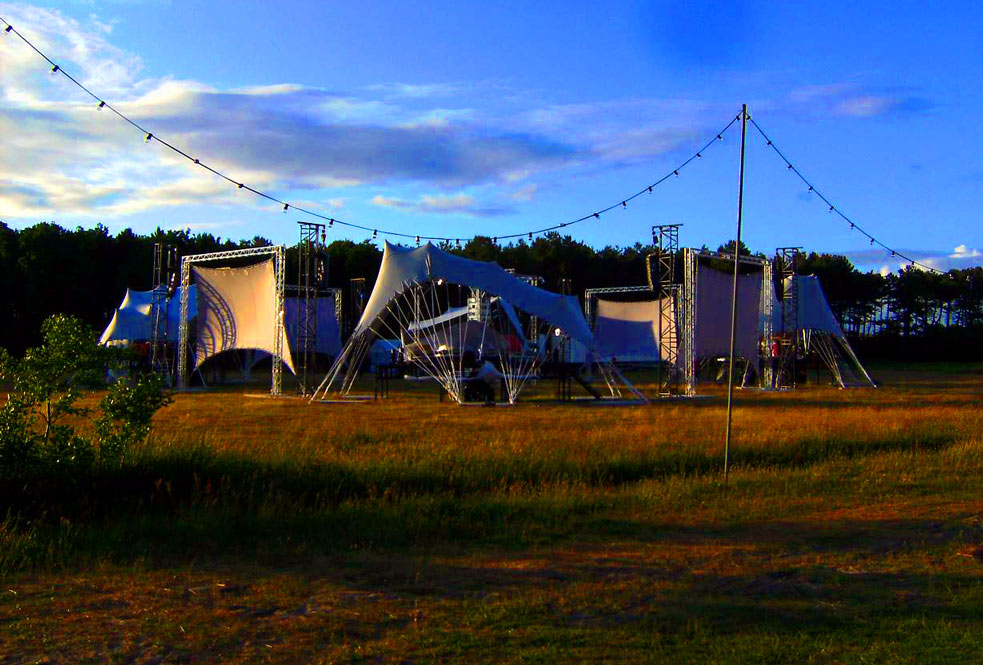
Time Project, a live music installation in 2008
