= Rendition (film) =

- Theatrical release poster
- Directed by: Gavin Hood
- Written by: Kelley Sane
- Produced by: Steve Golin; David Kanter; Keith Redmon; Michael Sugar; Marcus Viscidi
- Starring: Jake Gyllenhaal; Reese Witherspoon; Peter Sarsgaard; Alan Arkin; Meryl Streep; Omar Metwally; Igal Naor; Moa Khouas; Zineb Oukach
- Cinematography: Dion Beebe
- Edited by: Megan Gill
- Music by: Paul Hepker; Mark Kilian
- Production companies: Level 1 Entertainment; Anonymous Content
- Distributed by: New Line Cinema
- Release dates: September 7, 2007 (TIFF); October 19, 2007 (United States)
- Running time: 122 minutes
- Country: United States
- Language: English
- Budget: $27.5 million
- Box office: $27 million

Rendition is a 2007 American political thriller film directed by Gavin Hood, and starring Reese Witherspoon, Jake Gyllenhaal, Meryl Streep, Peter Sarsgaard, Alan Arkin, and Omar Metwally. The film centers on the controversial CIA practice of extraordinary rendition and is based on the true story of Khalid El-Masri, who was mistaken for Khalid al-Masri.

The film was produced by Level 1 Entertainment and Anonymous Content and distributed by New Line Cinema, and premiered at the Toronto International Film Festival on September 7, 2007, before being released theatrically in North America on October 19, 2007. The film received mixed reviews from critics and underperformed at the box office.

== Plot ==
In North Africa, CIA analyst Douglas Freeman briefs an agent. A suicide attack kills the agent and 18 civilians; the target was high-ranking police official Abbas-i "Abasi" Fawal (Igal Naor), a liaison for the United States who conducts interrogations with techniques amounting to torture, but Fawal is unharmed.

Egyptian-born Anwar El-Ibrahimi is a chemical engineer living in Chicago with his mother, his pregnant wife Isabella, and their young son. He is believed to be linked to known terrorist Rashid by records indicating several calls to his cellphone. Returning from a conference in South Africa, Anwar is detained by American officials and sent to a secret facility near the earlier attack, where he is interrogated and tortured.

Isabella is not informed of her husband’s whereabouts, and all official evidence of his being on the plane at Cape Town International Airport is erased. Freeman, assigned to observe Anwar’s interrogation by Fawal, is doubtful of his guilt, but CIA superior Corrine Whitman insists such treatments are necessary to save potential victims of terrorism.

Isabella travels to Washington, D.C. to ask friend Alan Smith, an aide to Senator Hawkins, to find her missing husband. He informs her that Anwar failed to board the plane in Cape Town, but she shows him her husband's credit card purchase at the in-flight duty-free shop, confirming he was on the flight. Smith pieces together details of Anwar's detention but is unable to convince Senator Hawkins or Corrine Whitman, who ordered the rendition, to release Anwar or acknowledge his imprisonment.

Hawkins tells Smith to let the matter go, as public debate on extraordinary rendition would complicate the senator’s bill before Congress. His sympathetic secretary tips Isabella off that Senator Hawkins will be visiting. She confronts him and Corrine Whitman before being led out by security, only to go into labour in the hallway.

Under torture, Anwar eventually confesses that he advised a man named Rashid on chemicals to enhance explosives and was promised $40,000. Freeman suspects a false confession, confirmed when the names Anwar gives are traced by Interpol and draw a blank. A quick Google search reveals the names belong to an Egyptian soccer team. Freeman approaches the Minister of the Interior with this finding, questioning why a man with a $200,000 salary would risk his life for $40,000. When discussing the value of intelligence gathered through torture, Freeman quotes from The Merchant of Venice by William Shakespeare: "I fear you speak upon the rack, Where men enforced do speak anything."

Freeman persuades the minister to release Anwar, sending him back to America via a clandestine ship to (Malaga and Madrid) Spain, then a flight to Chicago, ignoring Lee Mayer's (Freeman's boss) frantic orders to hand him back to Fawal and knowing he will probably be branded as insubordinate. Freeman also leaks the torture details to the press, igniting a worldwide scandal and likely ending his career. Anwar returns home and shares a tearful reunion with Isabella, his son, and their newborn baby.

=== Sub-plot ===
In a parallel storyline, Abasi Fawal's daughter Fatima runs away with her boyfriend Khalid. Abasi learns Khalid's late brother was an inmate at his prison.

Fatima learns that Khalid belongs to a terrorist group, and discovers a notebook with pictures: Khalid and his brother brandishing AK-47s; a grief-stricken Khalid standing over his brother's corpse; her father; and a statement that Khalid will avenge his brother.

Realising that her father, responsible for the death of Khalid's brother, is about to be assassinated by Khalid, she runs to the town square and confronts Khalid. He hesitates, and is killed by the attack’s organizers; he releases the dead man's switch, and Fatima is killed in the explosion at the beginning of the film.

Abasi rushes to Khalid's apartment and discovers Khalid's grandmother grieving the loss of her grandsons and Fatima. Abasi realizes his daughter died trying to protect him.

=== Theory ===
The phone record implicating Anwar remains unexplained. It is mentioned that phones are often passed off to avoid tracing; the DVD extras explain a subplot on this concept that was cut from the film. Director Gavin Hood stated in an interview that the ambiguity of Anwar’s involvement was deliberate, to let the viewer decide whether the possibility of his guilt justified kidnapping and torture.

== Cast ==
- Reese Witherspoon as Isabella Fields El-Ibrahimi
- Jake Gyllenhaal as Douglas Freeman
- Meryl Streep as Corrine Whitman
- Omar Metwally as Anwar El-Ibrahimi
- Alan Arkin as Senator Hawkins
- Peter Sarsgaard as Alan Smith
- Aramis Knight as Jeremy El-Ibrahimi
- Rosie Malek-Yonan as Nuru El-Ibrahimi
- Moa Khouas as Khalid El-Emin
- Zineb Oukach as Fatima Fawal
- Igal Naor as Abasi Fawal
- J. K. Simmons as Lee Mayers
- Bob Gunton as Lars Whitman
- Hadar Ratzon as Safiya
- Reymond Amsalem as Layla Fawal
- Simon Abkarian as Said Abdel Aziz
- Wendy Phillips as Samantha
- Laila Mrabti as Lina Fawal
- Christian Martin as Senator Lewis' aide

== Reception ==
Reviews for Rendition were mixed. On the review aggregator website Rotten Tomatoes, 47% of 152 critics' reviews are positive. The website's consensus reads: "The impressive cast cannot rescue Rendition, which explores complex issues in woefully simplified terms." On Metacritic, the film averaged a score of 55 based on 34 reviews. Audiences polled by CinemaScore gave the film an average grade of "B+" on an A+ to F scale.

Roger Ebert awarded the film four stars out of four, saying, "Rendition is valuable and rare. As I wrote from Toronto: 'It is a movie about the theory and practice of two things: torture and personal responsibility. And it is wise about what is right, and what is wrong.'" In contrast, Peter Travers of Rolling Stone applauded the cast, but noted that the film was a "bust as a persuasive drama". Travers declared the film the year's Worst Anti-War Film on his list of the Worst Movies of 2007.

== See also ==
- Extraordinary Rendition (film)
