= Rasputin: Dark Servant of Destiny =

- Rasputin: Dark Servant of Destiny film poster
- Genre: Biography; Historical drama
- Written by: Peter Pruce
- Directed by: Uli Edel
- Starring: Alan Rickman; Greta Scacchi; Ian McKellen; David Warner; John Wood
- Theme music composer: Brad Fiedel
- Country of origin: United States

Production
- Executive producers: David R. Ginsburg; David Kirkpatrick
- Producers: Nick Gillott; Galina Tuchinsky
- Production locations: Budapest, Hungary; St. Petersburg, Russia
- Cinematography: Elemér Ragályi
- Editors: Seth Flaum; Dan Rae
- Running time: 100 minutes
- Production companies: HBO Pictures; Rysher / Citadel Entertainment

Original release
- Network: HBO
- Release: March 23, 1996

Rasputin: Dark Servant of Destiny is a 1996 American biographical historical drama television film directed by Uli Edel and starring Alan Rickman, Greta Scacchi and Ian McKellen. It chronicles the last four years (1912–1916) of Grigori Rasputin's stint as a healer to Alexei Nikolaevich, Tsarevich of Russia; the heir apparent to the Russian throne as well as the only son of Tsar Nicholas II of Russia and Empress Alexandra Feodorovna; who suffered from hemophilia. The film is narrated in the first person by Alexei. The film premiered on HBO on March 23, 1996.

== Plot ==
In 1991, the remains of Russian Tsar Nicholas II and his family (except for Alexei and Maria) are discovered. The voice of Nicholas' young son, Tsarevich Alexei Nikolaevich, narrates the remainder of the story.

In 1883 Western Siberia, a young Grigori Rasputin is asked by his father Efim and a group of men to perform magic. Rasputin has a vision and denounces one of the men as a horse thief. Although Efim initially slaps him for making such an accusation, Rasputin watches as the man is chased outside and beaten. Twenty years later, Rasputin sees a vision of the Virgin Mary, prompting him to become a priest. Rasputin quickly becomes famous, with people, even a bishop, begging for his blessing.

Meanwhile, in St. Petersburg, Alexei is confined to his bed suffering from severe bruising to his leg caused by Hemophilia B, a disease that prevents proper blood clotting. Nicholas has so far kept Alexei's illness a secret from the Russian people. Eugene Botkin, the family's court physician, has been unable to help the boy. Alexei's mother, Tsarina Alexandra Feodorovna asks to see a spiritual healer, and is recommended to call upon Rasputin.

Rasputin is summoned to the Tsar's palace and brought before Alexei. Rasputin startles Nicholas and Alexandra by asking Alexei about his leg, despite neither of them having told him of Alexei's affliction. Rasputin soothes Alexei with images of sailing whilst he places his hand on the boy's leg. Rasputin limps away, causing Alexandra to believe he has absorbed Alexei's pain into his own body. Nicholas asks Rasputin how he knew about Alexei's leg and Rasputin responds that the Virgin Mary told him and sent him to heal Alexei; Nicholas remains skeptical.

The next morning, Alexei awakens in perfect health and proclaims that Rasputin has healed him with magic. Dr. Botkin insists that it was a treatment he started using on Alexei the week before. Alexandra visits Rasputin to thank him. Rasputin questions Alexandra's faith in God, placing the blame for Alexei's disease on her weak prayers. Alexandra asks that Rasputin move in with the family and gives him his own chamber in the palace.

Rasputin begins to become acquainted with Nicholas's daughters, Olga, Tatiana, Maria and Anastasia; worrying Nicholas after he hears rumors of Rasputin's womanizing and flings with prostitutes. Nicholas soon asks Rasputin to leave the palace. Later, Alexei suffers a severe nosebleed and Alexandra begs for Rasputin to be brought back to heal Alexei again. Rasputin returns and heals Alexei, converting Nicholas in the process, although Dr. Botkin remains convinced that Rasputin is merely hypnotizing Alexei.

Dr. Botkin vents his suspicions to Russian Prime Minister Pyotr Stolypin, who sends men to spy on Rasputin. A woman named Princess Marisa visits Rasputin, asking to be blessed. Rasputin tells her that before one can ask for absolution one must sin and convinces her to have sex with him. Stolypin's spies watch this happen.

Stolypin approaches Nicholas with his findings, and with news that rumors are circulating throughout Russia regarding Rasputin's stay at the palace and closeness to the Imperial Family, particularly Alexandra. That night, a drunken Rasputin makes some obscene comments about the Imperial Family and is brought before the Tsar. Nicholas banishes Rasputin from St. Petersburg and Rasputin prophesies a terrible future for Russia and Stolypin's own assassination. A month later Nicholas is informed of the onset of World War I and Stolypin is shot and killed.

Alexei suffers another severe bleeding, prompting Alexandra and Nicholas to call Rasputin. Rasputin heals Alexei over the phone, re-confirming Nicholas's faith in the healer. Rasputin is forgiven and returns to the palace. As millions of Russian soldiers die in World War I, citizens place the blame on Alexandra and Rasputin. Rasputin stops seeing the Virgin Mary, causing Alexandra and his fellow monks to desert him.

A group of men led by Prince Felix Yusupov decide to murder Rasputin and invite him to the Yusupov Palace in December 1916. Felix feeds Rasputin cakes and wine laced with lethal amounts of cyanide but is horrified when it seems to have no effect. Felix then shoots Rasputin, who still does not die. Rasputin stumbles through the courtyard to the palace gates before being shot four more times, finally collapsing and dying. His body is thrown from a bridge into the icy Malaya Nevka River.

Alexandra reads a note left behind by Rasputin, revealing his prior knowledge that he would be murdered and that should the murderers be nobles, the Imperial Family would die within two years. In 1917, with Russia on the verge of collapse due to the war, Nicholas is forced to abdicate as Tsar and is sent into exile with his family. The Imperial Family is executed in Yekaterinburg on 17 July 1918.

== Cast ==
- Alan Rickman as Grigori Rasputin
  - Tamás Tóth as Young Grigori Rasputin
- Greta Scacchi as Tsarina Alexandra Feodorovka
- Ian McKellen as Tsar Nicholas II
- Freddie Finlay as Tsarevich Alexei Nikolaevich
- David Warner as Dr. Eugene Botkin
- John Wood as Prime Minister Pyotr Stolypin
- James Frain as Prince Felix Yusupov
- Ian Hogg as Vladimir Purishkevich
- Sheila Ruskin as Princess Marisa Ivanova
- Peter Jeffrey as Bishop Hermogones
- Julian Curry as Dr. Lazovert
- John Carter as Efim Rasputin
- Zsofia Ivony as Grand Duchess Maria Nikolaevna
- Gábor Koncz as Yurovsky
- Patricia Kovács as Grand Duchess Anastasia Nikolaevna
- Robert Lang as Alexander Protopopov
- Diana Quick as Grand Duchess Ella Feodrovna
- Natasha Reshetnikova as Grand Duchess Tatiana Nikolaevna
- John Turner as Grand Duke Serge Alexandrovich

== Historical accuracy ==
Russian Prime Minister Pyotr Stolypin (John Wood) is shown to have been killed in 1913 on the occasion of the Romanov dynasty's Tercentenary celebration and just prior to the outbreak of World War I, while he was actually killed in 1911.

The Russian Orthodox Choir which sings the litany at the Tercentenary liturgy also seems to be a choir of the 1990s, since Patriarch Alexy II of Moscow is mentioned by name. The Patriarchate in fact did not exist under the later Romanovs, having been abolished by Peter the Great.

== Reception ==
Caryn James in The New York Times praised Alan Rickman, Ian McKellen and Greta Scacchi, and called the film "fascinating... a cleverly entertaining character study".

== Awards and nominations ==
Rasputin: Dark Servant of Destiny won a Golden Globe Award for Best Miniseries or Television Film. Alan Rickman, starring as Grigori Rasputin, won an Emmy Award (along with Greta Scacchi playing Tsarina Alexandra Feodorovna) and a Golden Globe for his work in this movie. Ian McKellen, playing Tsar Nicholas II, won a Golden Globe for Best Supporting Actor and was nominated an Emmy Award for Best Supporting Actor.

Year	Association	Category	Nominee(s)	Result
1996	CableACE Awards	Best Supporting Actress in a Movie or Miniseries	Greta Scacchi	Nominated
1996	CableACE Awards	Best Costume Design	Natasha Landau	Nominated
1996	Primetime Emmy Awards	Outstanding Lead Actor in a Miniseries or a Movie	Alan Rickman	Won
1996	Primetime Emmy Awards	Outstanding Supporting Actor in a Miniseries or a Movie	Ian McKellen	Nominated
1996	Primetime Emmy Awards	Outstanding Supporting Actress in a Miniseries or a Movie	Greta Scacchi	Won
1996	Primetime Emmy Awards	Outstanding Cinematography for a Miniseries or Movie	Elemér Ragályi	Won
1996	Primetime Emmy Awards	Outstanding Costumes for a Miniseries, Movie or a Special	Natasha Landau	Nominated
1997	Golden Globe Awards	Best Miniseries or Television Film		Won
1997	Golden Globe Awards	Best Actor – Miniseries or Television Film	Alan Rickman	Won
1997	Golden Globe Awards	Best Supporting Actor – Series, Miniseries or Television Film	Ian McKellen	Won
1997	Golden Globe Awards	Best Supporting Actress – Series, Miniseries or Television Film	Greta Scacchi	Nominated
1997	Satellite Awards	Best Actor – Miniseries or Television Film	Alan Rickman	Won
1997	Satellite Awards	Best Supporting Actor – Series, Miniseries or Television Film	Ian McKellen	Nominated
1997	Satellite Awards	Best Supporting Actress – Series, Miniseries or Television Film	Greta Scacchi	Nominated
1997	Screen Actors Guild Awards	Outstanding Performance by a Male Actor in a Miniseries or Television Movie	Alan Rickman	Won
