= Seminar (play) =

2011 play by Theresa Rebeck

- Logo of the production
- Written by: Theresa Rebeck
- Characters: Leonard; Kate; Martin; Douglas; Izzy
- Original language: English
- Subject: A series of writing seminars.
- Genre: Comedy
- Setting: Present day; New York City

Premiere
- Date premiered: November 20, 2011
- Place premiered: John Golden Theatre; New York City

Seminar is a play by Theresa Rebeck which premiered on Broadway in 2011.

== Productions ==
Seminar premiered on Broadway at the John Golden Theatre on November 20, 2011 and closed on May 6, 2012. Alan Rickman originated the role of the lead character, Leonard. Jeff Goldblum replaced Rickman as Leonard on April 3, 2012. Ticket sales dropped following Rickman's departure.

The production was directed by Sam Gold and produced by Jeffrey Finn, Jill Furman, John N. Hart Jr. and Patrick Milling-Smith. It featured original music by John Gromada. This production was nominated as Best Play by the Outer Critics Circle and the Drama League, but did not earn any Tony Award nominations.

Seminar opened at the San Francisco Playhouse on May 3, 2014, and received outstanding reviews from the local press. The play was directed by Amy Glazer; the role of Leonard was played by Charles Shaw Robinson.

== Plot ==
Set in present-day New York City, Seminar follows four young writers — Kate, Martin, Douglas, and Izzy — and their professor, Leonard. Each student has paid Leonard $5,000 for a ten-week writing seminar to be held in Kate's Upper West Side apartment. As tensions arise and romance falls, they clash over their writing, their relations, and their futures.

== Principal roles and Broadway casts ==
Character	Description	Original Broadway performer	Closing Night Broadway performer
Leonard	The seminar's professor, he has long, dramatic history as a writer.	Alan Rickman	Jeff Goldblum
Martin	A writer who is struggling financially. He is afraid to show his work to anyone.	Hamish Linklater	Justin Long
Douglas	Nephew of a famous playwright from Harvard. He can actually write, but is constantly accused of "name dropping."	Jerry O'Connell	Jerry O'Connell
Izzy	Deemed a good writer from the beginning, she is at the center of the group's romantic conflicts.	Hettienne Park	Hettienne Park
Kate	Her writing is immediately criticized as having a narrator no one cares about. She constantly tries to prove herself.	Lily Rabe	Zoe Lister-Jones

== Critical reception ==
The play was mostly well received. Ben Brantley of The New York Times criticized some script elements, but praised Rickman's acting: "This mélange of feelings, magnificently orchestrated by Mr. Rickman, is arrived at after Leonard has only glanced at the first couple of pages of a vast manuscript. But ... I felt an authentic rush of pleasure and the exhilaration of being reminded that in theater, art comes less from landing lines than [from] finding what lies between them."

Elysa Gardner of USA Today called Seminar an "enriching study". David Rooney of the Hollywood Reporter found the play "tight, witty and consistently entertaining, acquiring more muscle as the layers are peeled back to reveal both the scarred humanity and the numbness beneath Leonard’s soured exterior."
