= Gavin Hood =

South African filmmaker

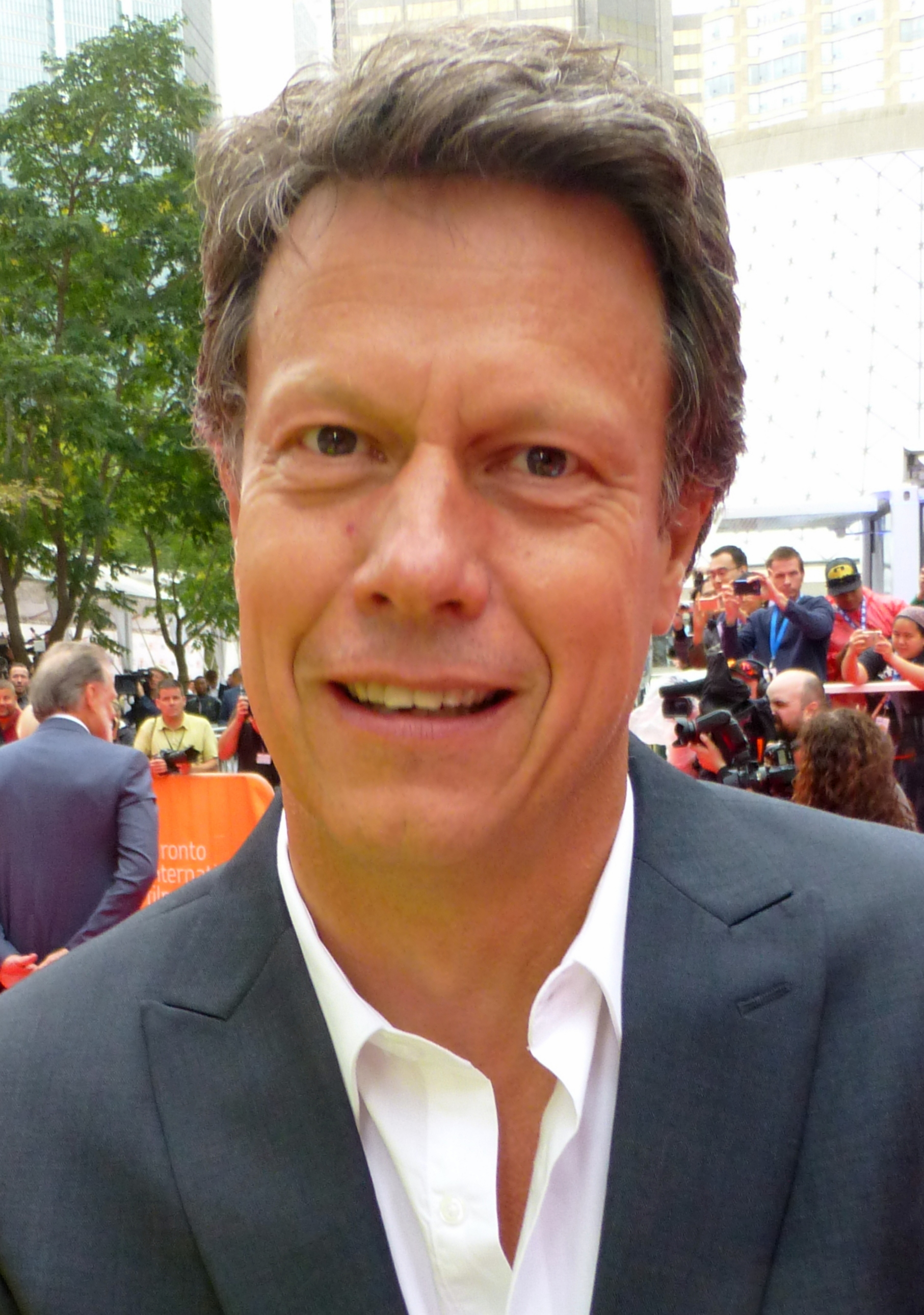
- Hood at the 2015 Toronto International Film Festival
- Born: 12 May 1963 (age 63); Johannesburg, South Africa
- Education: St Stithians College
- Occupations: Film director; screenwriter; actor; film producer
- Years active: 1989–present

Gavin Hood (born 12 May 1963) is a South African filmmaker, and actor, best known for writing and directing Tsotsi (2005), which won the Academy Award for Best International Feature Film. He also directed the films X-Men Origins: Wolverine, Ender's Game, Eye in the Sky and Official Secrets.

== Early life ==
Hood was born in Johannesburg and grew up in the Hillbrow area. He is the son of the English-born South African retailer Gordon Hood (d. 2013). Hood attended St Stithians College and went on to graduate with a law degree from the University of the Witwatersrand. He then pursued a post-graduate degree in screenwriting and directing at a film school in California in 1991.

== Directing career ==
Upon returning to his home country, Hood got his start in directing when he was commissioned to make several short educational dramas for the South African Department of Health. His first commercial short film was The Storekeeper (1998). He earned an Artes Award for his contributions.

Hood co-produced and wrote the script for his debut feature film, A Reasonable Man (1999), which portrays the accidental killing of a young child mistaken for a tokoloshe. He then directed the Polish language 2001 feature film In Desert and Wilderness (W pustyni i w puszczy) when its original director fell ill. This was then followed by the critically acclaimed crime drama film Tsotsi (2005). Tsotsi went on to win the 2005 Academy Award for Best International Feature Film, granting him his first Academy Award, and was nominated for the Golden Globe for Best Foreign Language Film in 2006. Hood was also nominated for the 2005 Non-European Film—Prix Screen International at the European Film Awards for his work on the film.

In 2000, Variety magazine named him as one of its "Ten Directors to Watch".

He directed Rendition (2007), his first Hollywood feature, for New Line Cinema. He also directed the film X-Men Origins: Wolverine, based on the Marvel Comics character of the same name, with Hugh Jackman reprising his role from the X-Men films.

Prior to the film's release, Gavin talked about the political undertones of the new Wolverine movie:

Any movie that is simply about good versus evil ... is in my view putting out into the world and certainly into a mass audience and young audience's mind a rather dangerous philosophy, which is that there is good and evil in the simplistic and easily defined way

...

I think that for the last eight years, we've had that philosophy very much prevalent in the Bush administration that if you're on the side of good, at least as you perceive it, then you can do no evil ... That's what's so great about this character or about this movie for me and why I wanted to do it ... This is a guy who recognizes his own capacity for evil and I think that's exciting in a sort of popular culture kind of way. After all, the most famous line from Wolverine, the comics, is "I am the best there is at what I do, but what I do best isn't very nice."

In 2011, Hood began work at the helm of novelist Orson Scott Card's Ender's Game. He wrote a draft of Card's screenplay and directed the film. Ender's Game was released in U.S. theaters on 1 November 2013.

Hood directed and acted in Eye in the Sky, which was released on 15 September 2015 at the TIFF in Toronto, Canada.

Hood wrote, directed, and executive produced the 2019 British film Official Secrets based on the real life case of the Iraq War whistleblower Katharine Gun.

== Personal life ==
Over the course of his career, Hood has "bounced about, back and forth" between South Africa, the United States, and the United Kingdom.

== Filmography ==
Short film

Year	Title	Director	Writer	Producer
1998	The Storekeeper	Yes	Yes	Yes

Feature film

Year	Title	Director	Writer	Producer
1999	A Reasonable Man	Yes	Yes	Yes
2001	In Desert and Wilderness	Yes	Yes	No
2005	Tsotsi	Yes	Yes	No
2007	Rendition	Yes	No	No
2009	X-Men Origins: Wolverine	Yes	No	No
2013	Ender's Game	Yes	Yes	No
2015	Eye in the Sky	Yes	No	No
2019	Official Secrets	Yes	Yes	Executive

=== Acting roles ===
Film

Year	Title	Role	Notes
1991	The Sheltering Desert	Willi	
1991	American Kickboxer	Ken Holligan	
1991	Curse III: Blood Sacrifice	Robert	
1994	Project Shadowchaser II	Tieg	
1995	Kickboxer 5	German Champion	Direct-to-video
1995	Human Timebomb	Mike	Direct-to-video
1997	Operation Delta Force 2: Mayday	Sparks	Direct-to-video
1998	Beings	US Doctor	Direct-to-video
1998	Operation Delta Force 3: Clear Target	Sparks	Direct-to-video
1999	A Reasonable Man	Sean Raine	
1999	Traitor's Heart	John Roberts	
2004	In Enemy Hands	Achilles Captain	
2013	Ender's Game	Giant	Voice and motion-capture performance cameo
2015	Eye in the Sky	Lieutenant Colonel Ed Walsh	

Television

Year	Title	Role	Notes
1993	The Game		13 episodes
1996	Rhodes	Frank Johnson	4 episodes
2004	Stargate SG-1	Colonel Alexi Vaselov	Episode "Lockdown"
2004	King Solomon's Mines	Bruce McNabb	Miniseries

== Awards and nominations ==
Year	Award	Category	Title	Result
2005	Academy Awards	Best International Feature Film	Tsotsi	Won
2005	BAFTA Awards	Best Film Not in the English Language	Tsotsi	Nominated
2005	Golden Globe Awards	Best Foreign Language Film	Tsotsi	Nominated
