= List of South African slang words =

South Africa is a culturally and ethnically diverse country with twelve official languages and a population known for its multilingualism. Mixing languages in everyday conversations, social media interactions, and musical compositions is a common practice.

South African slang is a hybrid linguistic code that has been shaped by centuries of migration, and integration. This informal language includes phonetic and lexical elements from indigenous Khoi languages, and input from Dutch, English, French, and German settlers. It also includes contributions from the Cape Malay community. There has also been some borrowing from indigenous African languages, particularly Zulu and Xhosa, Contemporary South African colloquial speech is an archive of these various languages

The list provided below outlines frequently used terms and phrases used in South Africa. This compilation also includes borrowed slang from neighboring countries such as Botswana, Eswatini (formerly Swaziland), Lesotho, and Namibia. Additionally, it may encompass linguistic elements from Eastern African nations like Mozambique and Zimbabwe based on the United Nations geoscheme for Africa.

== Curse words and slurs ==
South Africa is a country formed from centuries of immigrants, settlers, and colonisers. It has a long history of using racial slurs or derogatory phrases when speaking of the other. Some such words have more recently been reclaimed as a mark of pride and defiance (for example, coloured).

"Voetsek", or simply "tsek", is a fun way of telling someone to "fuck off". This is also used to scare unwanted animals away.

"Jou Ma se kont" or "Jou Ma se poes" is a derogatory phrase that literally translates to "Your Mom's cunt" or "Your Mom's pussy". The term originates from the Western Cape region where it is most closely associated with the slang used by the Coloured community. This is often seen as more aggressive than the aforementioned phrase "voetsek". Although still seen as offensive, over time it has become a less aggressive adjective used as an exclamation. Such as "it is poes cold" when describing a surprisingly cold temperature.

=== Gestures ===
Pointing your thumb through your fist at someone is a very rude gesture, conveying a meaning similar to "fuck you," depending on the context.

The bras d'honneur is also seen as highly offensive, which is another way of conveying "fuck you", or "up yours!".

== Colloquial phrases ==
Slang phrases

• By fire by force – a phrase used to tell one that they are going to do something regardless of the conditions. (e.g. “You are going to the doctor by fire by force”)

• Dala what you must - A phrase used to signify that one must do what they think is right or what is most appropriate in a given situation (e.g. “That's a bad situation, you just have to dala what you must”)

• ID photo - the washing of your face and teeth only, instead of your whole body (e.g. “I'm late so I am going to do an ID photo.”)

• Is not make sure – To say that something is not good, not convincing, an overreach or delusional at the worst. (e.g. “This new chips flavour is not make sure”)

• Like things - Used to call someone nosey. (e.g. “That ou like things.”)

• Same WhatsApp Group - Used when two or more things are alike (e.g. “Those two stick with each other because they are in the same WhatsApp group”)

=== Time ===
Normally, in other English-speaking countries, when you say you're doing something "now", you would assume it means that you will do said thing right away. In South Africa, the phrases "now now", "just now", and "right now" all have differing connotations: "Now now" often means minutes later; "just now" means hours later; and "right now" actually means now.

For example, the following line using South African slang:

"I am going to see a movie just now. I will drive there now now. I am at the movies right now."

...actually has the following meaning in standard usage:

"I am going to see a movie in an hour or so. I will (start to) drive there in a few minutes. I am at the movies now."

== Slang words from English ==
South Africa uses British English spelling and punctuation, although some American spellings are common.

- canyon crab – derogatory term for Afrikaner
- clutchplate – derogatory term for Afrikaner
- cozzie – a swimsuit, short for swimming costume
- Dutchman – derogatory term for Afrikaner
- rockspider – derogatory term for Afrikaner.
- zamalek – Black Label Lager, locally brewed under licence; derived from the Egyptian football team of the same name because of the team colours. A very popular local beer because of its high alcohol content.

== Slang words from Afrikaans (Afrikanerisms) ==
=== A ===
- aya – brother and rasta
- abba – to carry someone (normally a child) on one's back
- africtionary – Website for African Slang dictionary.
- ag man – oh man; ag as the Afrikaans equivalent to "oh" (pronounced \ach\ like German ACHtung), "man" pronounced as in "mun" in "munches".
- ag shame – both an expression of pity and sorrow, depending on context: Ag shame, daardie baba is te oulik! (Aw, that baby is so cute!); Ag shame, die arme hond is dood. (Ah shame, the poor dog died.)
- antie – an older female authority figure. Derived from the English "aunt", with the original meaning still intact.
- anties – breasts/boobs or plural of the word "aunt"
- aweh/awe (pronounced \AAAH-WHE\) – said in excitement, as in: 'Aweh; my boss said I can go home early today.', 'or 'Ok, cool'.' Same as the English pop culture slang 'yas'. The word has many meanings or uses: "hello", "goodbye", "yes", "cool". Also associated with prison use. (Greeting) "Aweh, my bru." (Hello my friend). Similar: howzit, yooit, hoesit, yo.

=== B ===
- babbelbek – someone who talks a lot
- babelaas / babbelas – hangover (from Zulu word "ibhabhalazi")
- bakgat – cool; expression of appreciation for something very well accomplished
- bakore – lit "bowl ears", refers specifically to people who have protruding ears, like a bowl's handles.
- bakkie – a utility truck or pick-up truck, now a mainstream word in South African English. Can also refer to a small plastic container/bowl.
- ballas – lit. "balls". Refers to the testicle.
- ballie – close male friend. Sometimes used to refer to an older man. Can also be used to describe an old man as irritable or crabby.
- ouballie – father. "My 'ouballie' always used to tell us this story."
- balsak – lit. "ball-sack". Refers specifically to the scrotum.
- bangbroek – lit. "scaredy-pants"
- befok (pejorative) – 'really good, exciting, cool', as in "The rock-show was befok." (Do not confuse with gefok.) Also means 'extremely angry', as in "He was so befok, he could scream." Also means "extremely crazy", as in "Are you befok?".
- befoetered/bedonnered/bemoerd – lit. "extremely angry" similar to "diedonnerend", etc. Usually used to refer to a person who is often in a very bad mood.
- bergie – from Afrikaans berg, which translates to "mountain", originally referring to vagrants who sheltered in the forests of Table Mountain; now a mainstream word for a particular subculture of vagrants, or homeless persons, especially in Cape Town.
- beter bang Jan, as dooie Jan – lit. "better to be a scared Jan rather than a dead Jan". English equivalent is "better to be safe than sorry".
- bietjie-baie – lit. "a little bit too much". "bietjie" (a little bit – "be-key") and "baie" (a lot – "bye-ya")
- bielie – a butch, yet friendly and often brave man with a lot of stamina. Someone who will lovingly do something tough no matter if the odds are stacked against him. Derived from the folk song "Jan, Jan, Jan, die bielie van die bosveld". Which describes a man (Jan) who is willing to do any form of hard labour with a smile on his face.
- blerrie/bladdy hell – damn/damnit. Originally from the British English phrase "bloody hell".
- bliksem – strike, hit, punch; also used often as an expression of surprise/emphasis. It derives from the Dutch word for "lightning", and often occurs in conjunction with donner. "Bliksem! Daai weerlig was hard!". (Damn! That lightning-strike was loud!) Used as a curse in Afrikaans: "Jou bliksem!" (You bastard!)
- bliksemse – lit. "damn thing" Used in conjunction with "donnerse".
- bloutrein – literally "blue train", referring to methylated spirits, sometimes used for drinking (filtered through a loaf of white bread). Also refers to the Blue Train, a luxury train that travels from Johannesburg to Cape Town via the Trans Karoo rail-line aka "Transkaroo".
- boef – lit. "law-breaker". Refers to any person who has broken a law and got away with it. Derived from the Afrikaans word of the same spelling for "to cuff" (i.e. to arrest, or get arrested). The plural "boewe", refers both to multiple persons in arrest and the handcuffs themselves. Considered outdated as "bliksem" and "skelm" are more commonly used.
- boer – literally "farmer" in Afrikaans. (pronounced boo-(r)). Also the verb "to farm".
- boer maak 'n plan – "farmer makes a plan" is an expression used to refer to a creative solution, often low-cost and rather innovative.
- boere – police, even when the police themselves are non-white people
- boererate – a number of local home remedies that are super effective and cheap. May also be applied to DIY projects.
- boerewors – a very popular mixed-meat spiced sausage in South Africa. In Afrikaans, literally "farmer's sausage", used as a mainstream word in South African English.
- boerewors roll/boerie roll – the South African equivalent of the hot dog, using the boerewors with an onion relish in a hot dog bun
- boggerol/bugger-all – Anglicism with identical meaning (absolutely nothing), usually succeeding the words "sweet blou/blue" to emphasize the "nothingness" of the topic.
- boland – refers to the geographic region north of Cape Town. See Boland.
- bollie – lit "to poop". Of unknown origin, it is the Afrikaans equivalent of "poop". Due to the fact that it's the most child-friendly description of defecation.
- bokkie – (diminutive of bok, literally meaning "little buck" or "doe") a popular term of endearment, comparable to "sweetheart", "honey", etc. Another meaning for the word bokkie (or bokbaardjie) is for a style of beard which is short (often pointy) and stylish and often surrounds just the mouth and chin in a circle (Goatee). Based on the Afrikaans word bok (lit. "buck", as well as goat).
- boom – marijuana (literally tree)
- bosberaad – strategy meeting held in a rural setting
- bossies, or bosbefok – crazy, whacko, mad. Also a term for one who has shell shock. Refers to the time of the South African Border War where soldiers spent time in the bush ("bos/bosse") and would return home suffering battle flash-backs (Post-traumatic stress disorder).
- boud or boude – butt or buttocks
- braai – a barbecue, to barbecue (from braaivleis – grilled meat), used as a mainstream word in South African English. Specifically to grill meat on an open fire. As a noun, it is also the literal area/object used for the grilling of the meat (in that case, the barbecue grill and stand) as well as the social gathering around it.
- braaivleis – see braai, braai meat
- braaibroodjies – toasted sandwiches that are grilled over an open flame on a braai. Usually served as a side-dish to braaivleis.
- brak – mongrel dog, can also refer to brackish water
- branna – short for "brandewyn" (lit. "brandy")
- broekie – panties or ladies underwear. From Afrikaans: broek, meaning "trousers/briefs". Common usage: "Don't get your broekies in a knot" which means "Calm down".
- broekie lace – ornate ironwork found on Victorian buildings (lit. 'pantie lace'), the tie that you find on board shorts
- bro/bra/bru/boet/boetie – a close male friend and a term of affection used by one male to another. All words are variations of the word "broer" in Afrikaans meaning "brother". Boetie (Pronounced 'Boet – tea') specifically means little brother in Afrikaans because of the "ie" diminutive suffix. You could say, "Hey bro, howzit" or "Thanks a million bro for lending me your car". When you refer to another male as bro is it because you consider that person to be such a good friend he is like a brother, a family member. Bro can also be used for strangers but only also if you wish to show a welcoming and friendly attitude towards them or when you want to deescalate tension in a friendly way as in "Chill out bro". However you would certainly not walk around calling every man you see, bro, because in South Africa the term is not used as loosely as it is in the US for example.
- bring-en-braai/bring-and-braai – guests bring their own food and drink (usually pre-prepared, except for the meat) to the braai. Traditions surrounding the event usually stipulate that any left-over food and drinks are left behind with the hosts of the party as a parting gift, unless the food was pre-prepared in a personal container.
- bromponie – lit. "a noisy pony", refers to a scooter motorcycle, because a full-size motorcycle is often referred to as an "ysterperd" (iron horse), considering a pony is much smaller than a horse.
- brommer – lit. "a noise maker" refers to a noisy fly, more specifically to the genus Morellia (which is much larger than its cousin, the common housefly).
- buk – duck your head down quickly, as in "Buk when you go in the door; it's really low."
- bucks – from the English word meaning (antelope) it refers to money (currency), although borrowed from the American term of the same meaning, coincidentally there are two types of bucks featured on the coins of the South African Rand (Springbok on the R1 and Kudu on the R2). Not to be confused with the "Bokke" (Springbokke/Springbucks).

=== C ===
- cherrie – sexy woman or the fruit cherry
- chop/tjop – it literally means a piece of meat ("pork chop" or "lamb chop") that you would often cook on a braai. If you can call someone a chop it means they are being silly or an acting like an idiot, "Don't be a chop". Calling someone a chop often does not mean any harm, it is a light and playful insult and this word is most commonly used in a friendly way between associates. It can also be meant in a teasing way, like "don't be silly".
- chop-chop – lit. means "quickly". Is used when a person has had something done, or wants to have something done in a short amount of time. Derived from the chopping of a knife.
- choty goty – beautiful girl
- chrisco – a party/disco where Christian music mainly features; a combination of the words "Christian" and "disco"
- Chwee chweereekeys – getting high

=== D ===
- domnaai - " he's a domnaai". Refer to someone who makes unwise decisions
- dagga – most commonly used word for marijuana, This word comes from KhoiKhoi daxa (or daXa-b) European settlers struggled to write their phonetics so there are several different spellings eg:daccha, dacka, and daggha.
- dice – not to be confused with the game of dice, it refers to a form of amateur motor-racing where 2 or more vehicles sprint to an impromptu Finish Line on public roads. Often considered to be a part of illegal street racing, dicing under the legal limit though is usually permitted, though still frowned upon.
- dik – lit. "thick". Can be a derogatory term for being overweight, similar to "dikgat", as well satiety (or the sensation of being full)
- dikbek – grumpy, in a huff (literally: "thick mouth" (pout)
- dikgat – lit. "fat-arsed". Derogatory term for overweight people, same as "vetgat"
- die donner in; die moer in; die bliksem in – lit. extremely angry. From "donner", "moer" and "bliksem", all meaning to "hit/ strike (someone)".
- dinges – thingamabob, a whatzit or a whatchamacallit. Dutch – dinges.
- dof – stupid or slow to understand. "Are you dof?"
- Dog het gedog hy plant 'n veer en 'n hoender kom op – lit. "Thought thought it would plant a feather and then a chicken would come up". Used in retort when someone says they thought something was a good idea and it turned out not to be.
- domkop – idiot (lit. dumbhead), same as German "Dummkopf" or Dutch "domkop"
- dom nool – emphasis of "stupid idiot"
- donner – to beat up. Same as "bliksem". Derived from "donder" (thunder, related to Thor).
- donnerse – lit. "damn thing". Often used in frustration with another person or thing: "Die donnerse ding wil nie werk nie." ("The damn thing doesn't wanna work").
- doos – literally "box". Depending on context, the slang/derogatory version can mean prat, twat, idiot but most commonly understood as a translation of "arsehole" or "cunt", which in that case would be considered highly offensive.
  - doos dronk – stupid drunk
- dop – alcohol, to drink alcohol, to fail a test. Originally refers to a tot (measure). The diminutive form "doppie" refers to a bottle cap.
- doss, dorse, dossing – sleep or nap
- draadsitter – lit. "fence sitter". Refers to someone who is uninterested in choosing a side in an argument and therefore remains neutral.
- draadtrek – lit. pull wire, to masturbate
- droëwors – (Afrikaans) dried boerewors, similar to biltong
- drol – lit. a turd (vulgar); also refers to an arsehole/idiot; a cigarette, with a singly sold cigarette called a 'los drol' ("loose cigarette")
- dronkie – drunkard
- druk – to embrace or squeeze, hug (noun) "Gee my 'n drukkie," "Give me a hug"
- druk 'n drie, druk a drol, druk 'n vinger in jou hol – lit. "score a try, squeeze a turd and insert your finger into your anus". A crude but humorous way to say "go finger-fuck yourself"
- donkie – someone or something that is lame, stupid, retarded, or just generally sucky to the max.

=== E ===
- eh pappa! – lit. "whoa daddy!"
- eina! – ouch!
- eish! – Wow! What? Expression of surprise. Of Bantu origin.
- ek sê – "I say!" Used when making a statement.
- ent, entjie – cigarette, can also refer to the act of smoking a cigarette.

=== F ===
- flou – an unfunny (weak) joke (from the Afrikaans word for weak), can also refer to weak coffee or tea or weak alcoholic drink. A person that is weak.
- fok – Afrikaans for "fuck", can be used in most ways it is used in English. Fokken = fucking, gefok = fucked. Dutch – Fokken = breeding (animals).
  - fokker – lit. "fucker".
  - fokkoff – lit. "fuckoff" (vulgar)
  - fokkol – lit. "fuck-all". Literally means "absolutely nothing" (vulgar): Ek het fokkol geld ("I've got no money").
  - fok voort – lit. to proceed in a single-minded direction regardless of obstacles. Derived from the phrase: Kyk Noord en Fok voort. (Look North, and go forth).
  - fok weet – lit. "fuck knows". A response to an unanswerable question (vulgar).
- FPK – flying poes klap, see poesklap

=== G ===
- gabba – the perineum. A combination of ‘gat’ and ‘ballas’: After cycling for five hours my gabba is a bit tender. Could also be used as a derogatory term to refer to a man.
- gat – lit. "hole". Also refers lit. to "arse". Can also be used as a shortened version of the word "gaan" (going to).
- gatkruip – lit. "arse creeping" or brown nosing
- gatvol – lit. annoyed enough to the brink of getting angry: Ek is gatvol vir jou kak. (I've had enough of your shit.)
- Gebruiker – cigarette
- gees – lit. represents intense passion, spirit, and mood.
- geit – (pronounced "gate", with the "g" sound in the back of the throat) It literally means "quirks". Usually a negative connotation in relation to a person being either: stubborn, fussy or demanding and sometimes also relating to hypochondriasis. Literal English translation will align it with "-ness" (a.i. hardness, stubbornness). An example is: "hardegat-geit" (lit. hard-arsed and cocky).
- gham – A word to describe someone that acts out in an uncivilzed manner, or refer to lower class person. (other words would be "tappit", :kommen: or when someone is gham it portrays them as being poor and or dirty.). "Ew, that guy is so gham!"
- gin-en-gaap – An expression of unknown origin, describes a person who is wasting time by either laziness or being too slow. Gaap is Afrikaans for yawn.
- goffel – ugly girl or woman. For example, "What a G!". Also a degrading term for a person of coloured origin.
- gomgat – bumpkin, redneck (in the US sense, not to be confused with rooinek, the literal translation of redneck).
- goof, ghoef – swim, take a dip
- goofed, ghoefed – stoned
- gooi – throw, chuck or to "tune" (see below) someone
- goose – also chick, cherry: a young woman or girlfriend (used mainly during the 1950s, now dated). Also a famous line by South African comedian Barry Hilton.
- gril – (pronounced with the g-sound in the back of the throat) it refers to a person having an adverse sensory reaction to something that is considered disgusting, creepy or freaky in any way. The closest English equivalent would be "hair-raising". Usually used in the phrase "ek gril myself dood vir...." (i get freaked-out by...).
- gwai – also cigarette. derived from "give me a cigarette. Translated – "gee da n gwai"

=== H ===
- hardegat-, gheit – lit. "hard-arsed". Describes the stubbornness of a person.
- Hier kom Groot Kak! – lit. "Here's comes big shit" Is an expression of revelation towards an often impending and undesired result.
- hoesit, hoezit – derived from "How is it going? – contracted to how's it? In South African English context, howzit is more a greeting of "hello" rather than "how are you?", similar to South African black slang's "eta" or "ola"
- hoer en remoer – lit "whoring around" by either throwing wild parties, or having casual sex with just about every attractive person you meet, applies to both genders.
- hokaai stop die lorrie! – lit. "Whoa there! Stop the lorry!". Often used to call an immediate halt in whatever is being done, usually in conjunction with a possible undesirable outcome.
- hol – lit. hollow. It also refers to "run very fast" ("Daai man hol so vinning"; "That man runs so fast"). Also refers to anus.
- holskeurend – lit. "anus-ripping". Refers to hysterical laughter.
- holflos – lit. "arsehole-floss", refers to a G-string.
- honne – informal spelling and pronunciation of "honde" (dogs).
- horrog – informal way to say "hot dog". Usually when made with Vienna sausages.
- hottentot – derogatory term describing people of multiracial ethnic backgrounds, especially those of Malaysian-descent (i.e. the majority of Capetonians). The word is derived from the early Dutch term for the Khoi-San people. "Hottentotsgod," or Hottentots' god, is Afrikaans for a Praying Mantis).
- hou jou bek – shut your muzzle/snout
- huistoegaantyd – lit. "time to go home". From "huis+toe" (to+home), "gaan" (go) and "tyd" (time).
- hy sal sy gat sien – lit. "he'll see his arse" fig. "He'll have his come-uppance"

=== I ===
- in sy moer in – badly damaged, destroyed (rude, often considered profanity due to 'moer' to beat up). often used in conjunction with "moer-in".
- in sy glory in – same as above, considered to be less rude.
- innie/oppie – informal combined spelling of the phrases "in die" (in the) and "op die" (on the).
- in jou noppies – lit. "you are thrilled". Used to describe levels of excitement, similar to "tickled pink".
- ipekonders – commonly pronounced as "iepie-corners", refers to Hypochondriasis. Unlike the actual disorder, it is often used to comically exaggerate a person's reaction to any kind of symptoms that are generally considered harmless regardless of the discomfort caused by them. Like when someone drinks cough-syrup after coughing just twice.

=== J ===
- ja – Yeah (literally "yes" in Afrikaans)
- Jakob regop – lit. "Jacob upright". Refers to an erect penis.
- jakkals trou met wolf se vrou – lit. "Jackal weds Wolf's wife". Refers to the weather phenomena known as a "monkey's wedding". Can be used to describe an unlikely situation. Also refers to a song of the same name by Afrikaans singer Karlien Van Jaarsveld.
- jux/juks/jags – Meaning "horny". For example, "Jinne meisie, jy maak my nou sommer lekker jags."
- ja-nee – literally "yes-no", an expression of positive confirmation. Example : Dis warm vandag. ("It's hot today") : Ja-nee ("Indeed")
- “Jasis” – “Jesus!” or “Good Lord”. Used to convey shock or exclamation. “Jasis that is a nice car!”
- Jan Allerman – lit. "Jan Every man". Local variant of the American term "Average Joe."
- jippo – Bypass, hack, slacking, short-term fix. I'll jippo the alarm to not make a sound while we work on it. While the team was working hard all night, Byron was jippoing.
- jippo-guts – Diarrhoea
- jirre – “The Lord” from "die Here", surprise, frustration, or emphasis.
- jislaaik! – Expression of surprise, can be positive or negative. Often used when you get a fright, but equally often during particularly exciting parts of a rugby game.
  - jissie – A shortened version of "jislaaik".
  - jinne – Another variation of "jislaaik".
- jip – Informal for "yes".
- jo – An exclamation e.g., "Jo, that was rude," "Jo, you gave me a fright!" Pronounced as in "yolk".
- jol – To have fun, to party, can also refer to a disco or party, to commit adultery or even dating or courting
- jou ma se poes! – lit. "your mom's pussy" (vulgar).
  - jou ma se [doos/gat/piel]! and other variations
- Juffie – The shortened version of "Juffrou". "Juffrou" is a shortened version of the formal title given to address a young unmarried woman "Mejuffrou" (Miss). It is also the formal title given to address a female teacher of any age or marital status, whereby "Juffie" would be considered informal.
- Jus – Not of sound mind. Saying "don't be jus" or "moenie jus wees nie" implies ridiculous or stupid behaviour. Somebody about to lick an electrified fence would be a bit "jus". More commonly used amongst the Cape Coloured community, but understood regionally.

=== K ===
- kaalgat – lit. "naked arse". Derived from the word "kaal" (naked), it's simply a more humorous description. Similar to the English term "birthday suits".
- Kaapse Dokter/Cape Doctor – A strong south-eastern wind in the Cape Peninsula-area. Called the "doctor" due to the belief that it clears the Cape Town air of its pollution.
- Kaapse Draai – lit. "Cape turn", refers to a folk song (of the same name) that describes a flightpath around the Cape Peninsula literally as the Pied crow flies (known as a Witborskraai in Afrikaans), can now be applied to actual tours around the peninsula. Singer Nádine released a single based on the folk song, with the same name. It also jokingly refers to a car that turns far to wide (i.e. like crossing into the oncoming lane).
- kafee/cafee/kaffie/caffie – refers to a café, though it can also refer to a small non-coffee serving grocery shop or Tuck shop.
- kaffer – Offensive pejorative referring to a black African.
- kaffer wil nie val nie – a phrase referring to the consumption of KWV. Often used by black South Africans at shebeens.
- kak – Literal translation: shit, crap, rubbish, nonsense (vulgar), of very wide usage. Also used as a way of further expressing one's feeling in language, for example, instead of "that girl is pretty" one can say emphatically "that girl is kak pretty!"
  - kak en betaal – lit "shit and pay". Used when frustrated about spending all your hard-earned money on family, or friends, and having none left for yourself. Closest English equivalent is "Cough it up and pay up", but it doesn't have anywhere near the same power.
  - kakhuis – lit. "shithouse". Refers to both a toilet and the bathroom it is located in, as well as "a lot of".
  - kakspul – lit. "shithouse/shitload". Refers to a troublesome situation as well as an exaggerated amount of money.
- Kannie is dood van kruiwa stoot – lit "(I can't) died from pushing a Wheelbarrow". The phrase "ek kan nie" (shortened to kannie = cannot/can't) is personified as a lazy man. The phrase is used as a form of motivation and discipline, implying that if you can do a physical task as easy as pushing a wheelbarrow, then you are more than capable enough to do any kind of hard work.
- katspoegie – lit. "kat's spit". Refers to a very small amount of something, similar to "bietjie" (a little bit)
- khaki – derogatory term for an English person. From the colour worn by British troops, as well as the traditional clothes worn by Boere (Afrikaans speaking white farmers).
- kêrels – police (original Afrikaans meaning: guys, chaps). "The kêrels are coming, watch out!" (dated). More commonly referring to boyfriend or literal translation: Guy or young man. Dutch – kerels.
- kerrie-en-rys – lit. "curry and rice", is a popular South African variant of a curry usually served with rice and blatjang
- kief, kif, kiff – (adjective) wicked, cool, neat, great, wonderful. The word derives from the Arabic word kif كيف, meaning pleasure or marijuana. This may also be related to the Afrikaans word for poison: gif. Coastal pot-smokers used the term to refer to Durban Poison: "Gifs" [locally-grown marijuana]. The word evolved into kiff, an adjective or exclamation meaning "cool", among English-speaking people on the east coast.
- kie-kie/kiekie/kiek-kie – pronounced "key-ki"; refers to a photograph
- Klaas Vakie – (pronounced "klaas faacky") refers to the mythical creature known as the Sandman, can also ironically refer to people who had just now woken up late.
- klankie – lit. "a sound", Can also mean unpleasant smell. Used in conjunction with "klank". Pronounced as in "clunk"
- klap – to smack. (from Afrikaans). "He got klapped in the bar". Like a "bitch-slap", but much worse. Another variation on this is the "kopklap" (getting slapped hard over the head), typically done by a parent of authority figure as a form of discipline.
- klikkie klik bek – lit. a tattle tale
- klippies, klippies n coke – Klipdrift, a brandy preferred by mostly Afrikaans men, usually leading to chinas getting bliksemed
- klipslag – lit. "stone-stroke". Used to jokingly refer to a person who can't swim even if their life depended on it and thus sinks like a stone in water, this is mostly a joking self-reference by pessimistic swimmers.
- klokke – lit. "bells". The plural of the word "klok" (derived from "clock"). It also refers to a man's testes.
- koebaai – an anglicism of "goodbye".
- koek – lit. "cake". Can be used to refer to a response to a sticky situation: "O Koek" (Oh Shit); clumped hair that is messy: Jou hare is gekoek (Your hair is very messy and difficult to brush); Can also refer to a vagina.
- Koeksister – A sweet pastry that's been fried and dipped in a honey syrup, and shaped in the form of a French-braid. It doesn't have anything to do with a sibling – "sister" is "suster" in Afrikaans. The "sis" refers to the sound it makes when fried in oil. Alternative spelling is koesister. It also can refer to lesbians, or female genitalia: "I can like to be teasing my koeksister while I are wearing a rokkie"
- koeldrank/cooldrink – refers to a soft drink
- koffie-moffie – a camp male waiter or male flight attendant. See "moffie".
- komme-sie komme-sa – lit. "either-or". An expression, of French origin, that states the user isn't sure about an answer and doesn't care either. Similar to the expression "tamato-tomato".
- kont – same as "cunt" in English (profanity)
- koppie – lit. "cup". Also refers to a relatively small hill, (with "koppie" being the diminutive form of "kop") in reference to it appearing like a small head (kop) poking out of the ground.
- kopraas – lit. "head noise". someone who talks endlessly
- kortgat – lit. "short arse". Cutesy nickname given to shorter-than average people, can be considered offensive unlike its antonym "langeraad".
- kotch – (from "kots") lit. "to vomit" (vulgar)
- krimpie – old person
- kraaines – lit. "crow's nest". While the original English meaning stays intact, it can also refer to a big mess. Whether it be messy hair, a messy bedroom or a loud and messy gathering, like a party.
- kreef – literally means "crayfish" but it refers to a promiscuous woman with the intent to attract men.
- kry 'n kramp! – lit. "get a cramp". A definitive expression of strong disagreement, usually used to end an argument regardless if the issue was resolved. Can also be used to refer to exaggerated negative feelings towards a stubborn person: Ek wens hy kry 'n kramp! (I wish he gets a cramp!). Used in conjunction with "gaan kak!".
- kwaai – cool, excellent (Afrikaans: "angry". Compare the US slang word phat.)
- kydaar – visitor from northern provinces, especially Gauteng, to Cape Town; from "kyk daar!" – "just look at that!". See also "soppiekoppie".
- kyk Noord en fok voort. – To continue without any clear plan in mind. To play it by ear. Directly translates to "Look North and fuck onward."
- kyk teen jou ooglede vas – lit. "looking through closed eyes". Contrary to "kyk aan die binnekant van jou ooglede" (which means to take a nap, or go to sleep), it refers to a person who is wide awake, yet cannot spot the item they're looking for that's right under their nose. Used in conjunction with "As dit 'n slang was, dan sou hy jou gepik het"

=== L ===
- laatlammetjie – lit. "late lamb", refers to the youngest child in a family, specifically if there is a significant age-gap between the child and their older sibling (or more specifically when there is 3 or more siblings; the 2nd youngest sibling). It should also be considered that the parents' are at an advanced age at that point. Laatlammetjies refer to a set of youngest siblings that are close in age to each other, but with a significant age gap between their older siblings. For example: Charlie Duncan (4yrs old) and Toby Duncan (1yr old), from the Disney Channel series Good Luck Charlie, are 12 and 16 years younger (respectively) than their older middle-brother Gabe Duncan.
- laf – to be silly or funny. Jy's laf! You're laf boet! "Ek klap 'n ding wat laf raak!" (Jokingly "clap"). (Soft way of saying you've lost it or you're a clown!)
- lag – to laugh. For example: They lag at the joke.
- laaitie, lighty – a younger person, esp. a younger male such as a younger brother or son
- lank – lots/a lot
- langeraad – (pronounced: "lung-A-raat") cutesy nickname given to a really tall person
- lang maer blonde man – a slight contrast to the phrase "tall, dark and handsome", it describes a goodlooking tall blonde-haired, and usually blue-eyed, man.
- laanie, larny – (n) boss, used in a different tone. (adj.) fancy
- las – 1. an act that is undesirable to commit, a burden. 2. To tell someone or suggest to stop doing an act. (origin: something that is slowing you or an object down; for example, "'n Las in die pad.", meaning "An object as in a stone in the road."). 3. To physically join two separate objects together: (Las die punte van die twee toue aanmekaar; Tie the two ends of the ropes together.)
- leeuloop – lit. "lion walk". Popularized by singer-comedian Robbie Wessels in the song of the same name, it refers to a naked dance (but slightly more humorous than vulgar). The song mainly describes a man getting down on all fours, clenching two balls (of "any" type) between his legs and pretending to be a lion by roaring.
- lekker – (lit. tasty) It means pleasing, tasty, nice, good, great, delicious. Lekker is used for just about anything you find nice. "How was the party? Lekker", "I met a lekker chick last night", "local is lekker, a popular slogan promoting South African culture and produce", "How is that steak? Lekker bro". Unlike its English counterpart "nice", use of the word "lekker" is actually promoted instead of frowned upon despite being very commonly used. It is speculated that "lekker" will never become clichéd.
- lorrie – lit. "truck". Derived from the English word "lorry" with an identical meaning, the term gained popularity after the British colonized South Africa. Though "trok" (the proper Afrikaans translation for "truck") is still in use, it has been heavily replaced with the slang term "lorrie". Is sometimes used to jokingly compare cars that are just as difficult to drive as an actual truck.
- los or loskind – lit. "loose, loose child." A really slutty girl, usually wears revealing clothes and is easy to get with (for example: "Sarah is 'n fokken loskind!")
- loskop – air head, literally a "lost head" refers to someone whose head is in the clouds, clumsy, forgetful.
- loslappie – a person who sleeps around a lot (i.e. "whore/manwhore", but not as derogatory)
- lus – to have a craving for. "I lus for a cigarette". (Also see "smaak".)

=== M ===
- ma-hulle/ma-le/pa-hulle/pa-le – collective references to both parents which can be either centered around the mother (ma) or father (pa). Based on the word hulle (them).
- maag wil werk – lit. "stomach wants to work", a polite way to say you need to shit as soon as possible. Often used in conjunction with "maag is omgekrap" (upset stomach).
- maak soos Rokoff en fokkoff! – lit. "make like Rokoff and fuckoff!" Of unknown origin, is a crude way of telling someone to go away. Is similar to the English sayings like: Make like hay" and "Make like eggs, and scramble".
- maaifoedie – motherfucker, as in "Jou maaifoedie"
- maat – friend (OED), also partner (wife, girlfriend)
- mal – mad, crazy, insane
- malhuis – lit. "looney bin"
- mallie – mother
- mamparra – idiot. Also refers to a dud or a brick made from recycled clay/mortar.
- melktert/milk tart – a traditional custard tart of Dutch origin. Unlike a conventional custard tart, a melktert has a strong milk flavour and is best served with a dash of cinnamon sprinkled on top.
- mengelmoes-kardoes – lit. "variety-case". Refers to a larger variety of "thrift" being on offer.
- mielie – millet corn (AmE) / maize (BrE), staple diet. The base ingredient of Mielie-meal, which is the flour of choice to make Pap (also called mieliepap), a popular type of porridge.
- mmchakawally – cigarettes
- moegoe – stupid person, coward, or weakling
- moffie – effeminate male homosexual (derogatory). Can be compared to "fairy". From "mofskaap", merino sheep.
- moenie duk hou nie - stop with your nonsense
- moer – to hit / to fight with, for example: "he is gonna moer you" Also a word for a nut used with a bolt
  - moerkoffie – is a strong blend of ground-coffee usually served with minimal milk in a tin-based mug.
  - moer-meter – comically describes a person's temperament for their tolerance of bullshit. Derived from the red thermometer and used as a metaphor as illustrated by Donald Duck when he gets mad. Used in conjunction with "bloediglik vererg".
  - moerse – a very strong word for big, for example: "that's a moerse house"
  - moer strip – a point in time when a person's patience has worn so thin, he could snap violently at any moment. Derived from a nut (moer) that strips its threads when excessive force is applied.
  - moer-toe – stuffed up or destroyed (my car is moer-toe)
- mompie – retard ("Liesl, you are such a mompie!")
- mooi, man! – "well done, man", used as an expression of appreciation in another person's achievement.
- Moola – lit. "money". Is the English slang term for money as well as the name of the actual mobile-currency used in the now defunct Mxit.
- morne – boring, sterile, unexciting ("This is more morne than watching Saracens play!")
- morsjors – lit. "a messy person". refers to a person who is behaving, and/or dressing, in a very messy (morsige) manner.
- mos – Afrikaans, implies that what has been said is well known or self-evident (a formal part of grammar, the closest English equivalent would be "duh!"). "Ek drink mos tee." ("I drink tea, duh!"). Used at the end of a sentence, as in "...Jy weet mos." ("...Obviously, as you know.")
- mossie-poep – lit. "sparrow-fart" based on the definition of "poep-ruik" (oversleeping in the morning), it refers to a very early "waking up time" in the morning, often more specifically before 6:00AM (before sparrows wake up, but after the cock's crow)
- muggie – bug, especially a little flying gnat
- mugwaai – cigarette
- mung – the term mung means to lose a life playing video games and it also represents Pallsmoor jail, you gonna go to the"mung" when you stolen something and you get caught by police.
- mxit taal – lit. "mix it language". Refers to the text-based grammar usage that was popularized by the now-defunct Mxit, a free instant messaging service. For example: Eng: How R U? Afrikaans: Hoe ganit? (Hoe gaan dit?); Eng: I'm gr8 (I'm great).

=== N ===
- nagani - a word to use when disagreeing on something
- naai (Afrikaans) – copulate; but strictly speaking "sew", from the action of a sewing machine needle.The word Naai for sexual intercourse originally comes from the KhoiKhoi language..
- nè? – do you know what I mean/agree?, oh really?, is it not so? or British English "innit?". Similar to the French "n'est-ce pas" and the Portuguese "né?", meaning "Isn't it?", e.g. "Jy hou van tee, nè?" ("You like tea, not so?") (informal). The South African English equivalent is "hey", for example "Eish, its cold hey?".
- neuk – lit. "to hit", less vulgar than "moer", "donner" and "bliksem"
- negentien-voetsek – "nineteen-voetsek" (Commonly pronounced "neëntien"; "nie'an teen"), refers to a date in the early 20th century, with "voetsek" (go far away) referring to a very early date. Translation: a very long time ago, often used when the specific date isn't known.
- nogal – of all things. Term expressing a measure of surprise.
- nooit – lit. "never." No way, unbelievable!
- nomme yah - refers to agreeing with someone or something
- nou – lit. "Immediately/now". Also means "narrow".
- nou-net – lit. "just now". Refers to an event that happened within a few minutes ago.
- nou-nou/now now – contrary to the original meaning of the English word "now", it means "in due time", and therefore can mean anything from "in the next five minutes" to "in the next five years".
- net-nou – lit. "just now." Can refer to an event that happened a while ago, maybe within 12hrs ("I saw him just now"). Or some time in the future ("I'm coming just now"), which could mean anything from 5 minutes to 5 years, or never.
- net-net – lit. "just just". Refers to something/someone that has either impeccable timing and/or is just shy from, and just far enough to, winning any competitive event. English equivalents are: "Just in the nick of time", "just shy of winning", "almost". For example: Ek het my eksamen vraestel net-net deur gekom (I just barely passed my exam).
- Nou gaan ons Braai! – lit. "Now we're gonna Braai!". Pokes fun at the procrastination of the braaier, who intends to start immediately, but doesn't start till much much later.

=== O ===
- O Griet! – lit. "Oh Gosh!". A catchphrase uttered by the beloved witch Liewe Heksie when calling out her magic horse, Griet, whom she's able to conjure-up with the phrase, though she never remembers his name and as a result she only ever summons him by accident whenever she's in panic. The popularity of the catchphrase ensured that it gained use via the general public and therefore is used by a person whenever their in a state of panic.
- O gonna Madonna – ("g" sound pronounced in the back of the throat) Derived from "O Gonna" ("Oh Shit", but not vulgar), the singer Madonna's name was added to the phrase by Leon Schuster for comedic rhyming effect, it has since become one of his signature catchphrases along with: "O gatta patata" and "Oh Schucks" (both mean "Oh Shit", and the latter was inspired by Leon's own last name).
- oom – an older man of authority, commonly in reference to an older Afrikaans man (Afrikaans for "uncle")
- ou (diminutive outjie, plural = ouens, outjies) man, guy, bloke (also oke) (literally "old")
- ou toppie – lit. "old head." Refers usually to an elderly man and a father.
- ouballie – lit. "old little ball(s)." Old man, dad; as in: "shaft me, ouballie" "My ouballie (father, dad) will be home soon".

=== P ===
- poppe huisie - a sort of game children used to play in their younger age where they pretend living together in a house and each one had to played their role .
- pak – lit. "to pack". Also means "to give a hiding", as the shortened version of pakslae, a "parcel of hidings"
- pap – also called "mieliepap", is a traditional maize ("mielie") porridge similar to grits; can also mean "deflated". Pap (porridge) is primarily known in three stages; all three are variant to the water-to-maize ratio: stywepap (lit. "stiff-pap"; 3/4 water-to-maize), phutupap/krummelpap (pap with a crumbly texture; 1/4 water-to-maize) and slap-pap (pap with a runny texture; 4/3 water-to-maize). Unlike most international porridges, pap (specifically the aforementioned phutupap and stywepap variations) is commonly served at both breakfast and dinner times in the Northern half of the country.
- pap-sop-nat – very wet
- papgat – lit. "flat/uninflated hole." Tired or weak.
- paplepel – lit. "pap-spoon"; a wooden spoon used in the making of pap, but can also be used to give a hiding
- paraat – disciplined. Somebody who is paraat, generally has "houding" i.e. style / character
- patat – lit. "sweet potato". A favourite side-dish for Afrikaners, the name "patat" ("pah-tut") can also become a pet-name or term of endearment.
- paw-paw – lit. a Paw-paw fruit. Can refer to an idiot, but is less derogatory and often used to lightly joke with the person in question.
- perdedrolle is vye – lit. "Horseshit is figs". When someone is accusing another person of bullshitting them: Jy probeer my se dat perdedrolle is fye! (You're trying to tell me that horseshit is figs!)
- piel – derogatory term for a male genitalia ("cock" or "dick")
- piele – everything is cool, e.g. piele vir Sannie
- piesang, piesang, paw-paw – lit. "banana, banana, paw-paw". Children's rhyme used when a person makes a fool of himself and/or is a sore loser.
- Piet Pompies – used to identify an anonymous man, similar to Joe Soap.
- plaas se prys – lit. "the price of a farm". Refers to anything that is considered too expensive regardless of its actual worth, considering that a farm is one of the most expensive pieces of property one could privately own.
- plaas – lit. "farm". Also, when someone falls down: Plaas gekoop. As a verb, it translates to "placed down" or "put down"
- plak – lit. "to stick". Can also refer to starting an informal settlement like a Township (Plakkerskamp)
- plakkerskamp/township – an informal settlement primarily housing non-whites of very low-income in poorly self-constructed houses known as "shacks"
- platsak – lit. "flat pocket." Out of cash, flat broke
- platteland – lit. "flat land", refers to a rural area, country (as in living in the country, as opposed to living in the city). The "flatness" refers to the fact that the area is geographically similar to farmlands.
- poep – lit. "to fart". Derived from the English term "poop", it literally means "to pass gas".
  - soos 'n poep teen donderweer – lit. "it's like farting against a thunderstorm". Meaning the argument being presented is falling on deaf ears due to either a much more intimidating defense, or just plain ignorance, i.e. the sound of the fart is being drowned-out by the sound of thunder. Its closest English counterpart would be "it's like talking to a brick wall".
- poepol – (from poephol, arse) an idiot. lit. an arsehole (more specifically the anus), but not as derogatory. Can be used as source of comedy: Ek voel soos 'n poepol.
- poepolletjie – lit. Diminutive form of poepol, strictly reserved as a term of endearment between couples.
- poepruik – lit. "to smell a fart". Refers to a person who is sleeping in late, though it specifically points to the person wasting time because of it.
- poes – derogatory term for female genitalia ("pussy" or "cunt")
- poesklap – lit. "vagina hit." A very hard slap. similar to "klap" (to smack/slap), but far more painful: Ek gaan jou so 'n harde poesklap gee, jou tanne gaan vibreer vir maande lank. (I'm gonna smack you so hard, that your teeth will vibrate for months). Poesklap therefore is far more life-threatening than a "bitch-slap".
  - FPK or flying poesklap – the deadliest of all the poesklaps
- poplap – derived from "lappop" (rag doll). It is a term of endearment towards young beautiful women, and can also extend to much younger girls usually via a grandfather-figure. The closest English equivalent would be "poppet".
- pote – lit. "animal paws". Is an informal reference to a person's feet ("voete" in Afrikaans) directly relating the condition and size of the feet to that of an animal's paws. Also derogatory term for police officers (plural).
- potjie – (pronounced "poi-key") lit. the diminutive form of the English/Afrikaans word "pot", referring to the cooking utensil, but more specifically a small-to-large sized cast iron pot that is traditionally used to make potjiekos, phutupap and samp (stampmielies).
- potjiekos – lit. "small pot food". Is a meat and vegetable dish that is specially cooked in a potjie. It is traditionally slow-cooked over an open fire for a couple of hours before being served during a Braai (social gathering). Though it is similar to a stew, the main differences are: a stew has much water/sauce, while a potjiekos has very little water/sauce; and you stir a stew, you don't stir potjiekos as it is intended to not have the individual ingredients' flavor mixing. Potjiekos is traditionally served with phutupap or samp. Though it is considered a meal on its own, it can also be served as a side dish to braaivleis and Mielies (corn on the cob) (as both would take up a considerable amount of space on the plate).
- potte – lit. "pots". Also refers to a huge behind.
- pouse – (pronounced "po-ze"). As an anglicism it is derived from its English counterpart which means to temporarily stop an audio or video, or a musical break. In its Afrikaans pronunciation it refers specifically to an intermission in theatre and a school recess. Due to code-switching, the English pronunciation (in its original meaning) is also regularly used by Afrikaners, though it is separated from the Afrikaans pronunciation's meaning. For example: Ek moet die video pause (Eng pro.) omdat ons nou op pause (Afr pro.) gaan. (I have to pause the video because we're going on recess now.)
- praat 'n gat innie kop – lit. "speaking a hole in someone's head". To strongly convince someone to agree with you.
- praatsiek – lit. "talk sick." Verbal diarrhea. A person who talks non-stop.

=== Q ===
- quarter-past kaal arm – lit. "quarter-past naked arm". A sarcastic response to the question "What time is it?", whereby the user either doesn't know the time or doesn't care. "Naked arm" refers to the person not wearing a wristwatch.

=== R ===
- rammetjie-uitnek – lit "ram with its head held high". Big-headed. Refers more to sporadic bragging rights, than egocentrism.
- reën katte en honde – lit. raining cats and dogs, i.e.: excessive rain
- renoster-snot – lit "rhinoceros snot". Prestik (a South African product similar to Blu Tack).
- rigting bedonnerd – lit. "directionless". Refers to any person who becomes easily disorientated when no visual references are helping their navigation, i.e. they feel lost very easily. It can also be used to humorously describe a person's poor sense of direction, for example: "James May can get lost in his own house."
- rietkooi – lit. "Reed bed", i.e. "bunk bed", considered out-dated as references to bunk beds in general fell out of use in favour of the English term. Original Afrikaans translation for "bunk-bed" is "stapelbed". Riet ("Reed") refers to the bunk bed frame's flimsy appearance while "kooi" is the slang term for a bed (specifically a single-bed), derived from the Capetonian dialect. "Kooi" is still in use in the Southern regions.
- rol – ("roll") A fight or brawl. Rolling – to fight.
- rooinek – ("red neck") Afrikaner derogatory term for English person or English-speaking South African. Derived in the 19th century due to native British not being used to the hot African sun and getting sunburnt, especially on the neck. Alternative explanation, reference to the fact that British officers during the two Boer Wars had red collars.
- rooijasse/rooibaadtjies – lit. a red jacket/coat. Refers to the British soldiers of the Anglo-Boer Wars that wore red coats.
- roomys-karretjie/ice-cream-karretjie – lit. "ice-cream car" refers to a purpose-modified vehicle that drives around and sells ice cream. Referred to in the U.S. as an "ice cream truck" and in the UK as an "ice-cream van". It also is considered a nickname for the Volkswagen Type 2 and Volkswagen Type 2 (T3), due to both vehicle's immense popularity in that configuration. Even though it is technically a panel van, it's still referred to as a "karretjie".

=== S ===
- s'n – Pronounced similar to "sin" ("i" is less emphasized), it indicates possession. English Equivalent is the apostrophe ('s). Used in conjunction with "syne" (his) and "hare" (hers)
- saffa – lit. "a South African". Taken from the initials "S.A." as well as an informal pronunciation of the name "South Africa" (as Saf-Africa), the term refers to any South African-born person who also grew up in the country. This sometimes also extends to the South African Expats.
- sakkie-sakkie – Also known as the Sokkie dans, is a style of sensual Ballroom dance.
- sat – tired, dead – "Ek is siek en sat van sy nonsens" – "I'm sick and tired of his nonsense", see 'vrek' below (pronounced as "sut" in English)
- schoepit – pronounced "s-choo-pit", is the informal pronunciation of the word "stupid".
- schoof - to look or gawk, usually at an attractive man/woman.
- scrompie – slang for "hobo" or bergie. (Liesl told her 7-year-old son, Karl, to walk away from the scrompie walking towards them.)
- se gat – expression of strong disagreement often used in conjunction with "se moer" & "jou gat" (your arse).
- sel – lit."cell" in all definitions of the word, i.e.: selfoon (cellphone); tronk sel (jail sel); plant sel (plant cell)
- sien jou gat – lit. "seeing your own arse". Refers to making an enormous fool of yourself and being out-performed & out-classed.
- sie-sah – expression of goodness, or of disgust, depending on context.
- sies, "sis" – expression of disgust, disappointment, annoyance, as in: Ag sies man.
- sit gat, rus bene – lit. "sit arse, rest legs". Refers to relaxing after a long hard day.
- skapie – someone who might be referred to as a "pussy". Literally "little sheep".
- skeef – skewed, gay, as in: hy het 'n bietjie skeef voorgekom (he seemed a bit gay)
- skelm – (pronounced: skellem) crook or trouble-maker, mistress, secret lover, on the sly
- skief – to glare at someone (root: Afrikaans 'skeef', skew)
- skiet kat – Vomiting
- skilpad het nie vere nie, en appels is nie pere nie – lit. "tortoises don't have feathers, and apples aren't pears". It is a children's rhyme that discusses a mistruth. It is the Afrikaans equivalent of "liar liar pants on fire."
- skinderbek/skinnerbekkie – refers to the person(s) who is spreading gossip, not to be taken as a compliment.
- skinner, skinder – gossip
- skommel(draadtrek) – to masturbate
- skop, skiet en boomklim – literally "kicking, shooting and climbing trees". A colloquial description of an action film, usually of the lighter, more humorous kind. (Think Jackie Chan.)
- skop, skiet en donner – literally "kicking, shooting and beating people up". A colloquial description of an action movie of the more violent kind. (Think Jean-Claude Van Damme and Arnold Schwarzenegger.)
- skort – watch out, be careful or something is wrong here
- skraal – "thin" or "emaciated"
- skrik – fright; also used in the phrase skrik my gat af (very big fright)
- skuit – (pronounced "skate") lit. "to shit"; similar to "taking a dump"
- skwaanz – to snitch and sue; a bru dat overreacts to situations or activities they themselves participate in, like, they choke out people in the choking game and thinks dat is fun, but when someone chokes THEM out, they snitch and sue. Also, "squanz"; "Yo, dat bru is skwaanz! We don't hang wit daardie fok."
- skyf – cigarette, a puff, and also less commonly marijuana or dagga
- slapgat – English translation is "lazy arse", also can refer to something badly put together, "Hy het dit slapgat gemaak" (he put it together haphazardly)
- slaptjips/ slapchips – (pronounced as "slup chips") similar to thick-cut British chips; usually soft, oily and soaked in vinegar. Slap is Afrikaans for "limp". French fries refers to thinly cut chips. Crispy potato/corn chips are referred to as 'chips'.
- smaak stukkend – to like very much or to love to pieces (literal meaning of stukkend). "Ek smaak you stukkend" = "I love you madly".
- smaak – "taste" also means, to like another person or thing.
- sneeudier – old person
- snoepie – (pronounced "snoopy") refers almost exclusively to a tuck shop based in a school. Tuck shops that are outside school property are often just called a "winkel" or "winkeltjie" (meaning "a small shop"), and sometimes also called a kafee (referring to a café, though not necessarily one that serves coffee). The original English usage of the term "Tuck shop" stays intact.
- snoeiers – A word meant to mean to refer to a pair of lesbians or ladies that are very affectionate towards each other, physically, emotionally, etc.
- snotklap – "i'll slap you so hard the snot will fly". Usually used to discipline a child.
- soek – to look for trouble with someone/to antagonise/to stir up trouble = "you soeking with me?" – Afrikaans: "to seek or look for".
- sommer – for no particular reason, "just because"
- soos 'n poep innie bad – lit "like a fart in a bathtub of water". Refers to something rising very quickly (literally like the bubbles caused by a fart), for example: Soos wat die vliegtuig opgestyg het, toe klim ons soos 'n poep innie bad tot by ons cruising altitude. (As the plane took off, we ascended like a fart in a bathtub to our cruising altitude).
- soos Siebies se gat – lit. "like Siebies' arse". Refers to a job done badly and a messy room. Derived from a man of unknown origin known as "Siebies" (short for Siebert or Sieberhagen)
- sopdrol – diarrhea, someone with a weak constitution, literally soup poo
- soutpiel – Sometimes shortened to soutie. A derogatory term for someone of British descent. Lit. salt dick, one who has one foot in England and one foot in South Africa, with their penis dangling in the Atlantic Ocean.
- soutpilaar – lit. "salt pillar". Refers to anyone who is standing and staring unnecessarily at something (whether it is at an object or into blank space, i.e. daydreaming) and isn't paying attention to his/her surroundings. Based on the biblical figure Lot's wife, who turned into a pillar of salt after disobeying God's command by looking back at the Destruction of Sodom and Gomorrah.
- spaarbussie/spaarbus – lit. "save-bus". Refers to a piggy bank.
- spiff – cool
- spookasem – lit. "ghost-breath". Refers to candy floss.
- springbok – lit. "springbok". As the antelope is the national animal of South Africa, its name has been used in several specialized fields to indicate a "belonging" to the country, incl: the former Springbok Radio (operated by the SABC), the South Africa national cricket team (was originally called the Sprinkboks, now called the Proteas due to disassociation with the Apartheid regime and the Springbok-emblem), the South Africa National Rugby Union Team (commonly called "the Springboks, or Bokke") and the call sign of South African Airways.
- spuitpoep – lit. "Diarrhea"
- spyker – lit. "a nail". Can also refer to rough sex, similar to "naai".
- steek – stab, poke (with a knife). "He/she steeked her/him" = "He/she poked her/him". Also see "naai" = Nick steeked me stukkend.
- stoepkakker – a dismissive term for a small, yappy dog, usually of mixed breed and with white curly fur. While putting on a big show of barking, this dog is actually too afraid to leave the porch (stoep) and so ends up having to defecate (kak) there.
- stok sweet, lit. "a stick sweet", combination of Afrikaans word for stick (stok) and sweet. A lollipop.
- stompie – a cigarette butt, a short person or impolite term to refer to the remaining arm/leg/finger after an amputation.
- stout – naughty
- stukkend – (Afrikaans) broken, a lot. Also commonly used when someone is hungover. For example, "I am so stukkend".
- stukkie, stekkie – a woman (from the Afrikaans meaning "a piece") – mostly used when referring to a woman that you have/have casual encounters with, girlfriend.
- stuur groete aan mannetjies Roux – lit. "Send greetings to Mannetjies Roux" a popular folk song by Laurika Rauch about the titular Springbok Rugby Player. The song describes a young girl going to live on a farm with her aunt and uncle, who are avid supporters of South African Rugby Union player Mannetjies Roux (pronounced Munne-keys (in Afrikaans) Roux (as in French)). A film based on the song was eventually released in 2013.
- suig 'n duik in my kop – lit. "sucking a dent in my skull". Refers to a very strong sucking sensation caused by a thick viscous drink when drinking it through a straw, especially a McDonald's milkshake, which is famous for the sensation.
- swak – broke. Original Afrikaans: weak. "I'm swak, ek sê". Also used to suggest that someone's behaviour was harsh (with varying degrees of seriousness, depending on tone and context), for example: "It's swak that I failed the test."
- sy naam is Kom Terug en sy van is Bloedbek/Bloedneus – lit. "its first name is Come Back, and its last name is Bloody-mouth/nose/Or Else". A verbal warning given to a person who wants to borrow something.

=== T ===
- tronkvoël - refers to someone who's been in jail
- tikkop - refers to someone who's using drugs( especially crystal meths)
- tsek – shortened version of voetsek. Crude way of saying 'go away'. Intended to be yelled at dogs, but commonly used to chase away bergies.
- te-moer-en-gone – an expression that comically states the levels of being lost. Can refer to either an object that is thrown out-of-bounds and is therefore lost, or more specifically getting lost in an area that is far from the nearest civilization. The closest English equivalent is "in the middle of nowhere".
- tekkies – running shoes. (The Anglicized pronunciation tackies has become mainstream in South African English.) Sports shoes that are specifically designed for running and often used for comfort.
- tiet – English equivalent "boob" or "breast" (from "teat"); tiete (plural); tietie (diminutive) and tieties (plural diminutive)
- tietie bottel – lit. "baby bottle".
- tet – breast or boob
- tjoef – a vape
- tjor/tjorretjie/tjorrie – diminutive description of a car, especially one that's being admired: This is a nice tjorretjie you got here!. (The second "tj" is pronounced as the "ch" in chat.)
- tjorts – defecation, can also refer to the sound droplets of liquid make, often referring to a very minimal amount of a liquid ingredient, similar to "kat spoegie".
- toppie, ou toppie – father – see ouballie
- tos – lit. to masturbate
- trek – to move or pull. (The word has become international with the meaning of "making a pioneering journey"; the slang usage more closely resembles the standard Afrikaans meaning.)
- trekker – lit. "mover". Also refers to a tractor, as it can be used to tow (pull) trailers and/or cars.
- tannie – lit. "aunt/mother". Derived from the Dutch word tante (aunt), it refers to any older female authority figure. The female counterpart of "oom" (uncle). Though the original English meaning stays intact, the term has come to indicate a sign of tremendous respect towards a much older woman. Rules in using the term correctly are: The woman must be at least 10 years older than oneself, otherwise they might consider it offensive towards their age if they are young; unless she is one's real-life aunt, referring to a woman as "tannie" is purely permission-based, i.e. if she doesn't accept the term (and she'll tell you), then you should refrain from using it when addressing her.
- tiekie/tie-kie/ticky – taken from the word "tiekieboks/ticky box", is the popular name of the now outdated streetside payphone. Though ticky boxes are still in use, they have been largely replaced by cellphones. The ticky box takes its name from the limited time-period per call, based on the ticking of a timer. Also the name given to the old 2 and a half cent piece and later the 5 cent piece.
- tok-tok-tokkie – refers to a woodpecker, with "tok-tok" being the onomatopoeia of the sound the bird makes while pecking. Also refers to the woodpecker-style birds used in some cuckoo clocks.
- toktokkie – a children's game where you knock on someones door and run away before they answer.
- trassie – a derogatory term for a hemaphrodite, homosexual male, or an effeminate male.
- trek deur jou hol – lit. "pulling something through your arse" refers to someone who has a tendency to ruin any property that was given to them whether they do it intentionally or not. Contrasts with the expression "kan dit deur 'n ring trek" (can pull it through a ring), which refers to something or someone that is extremely well polished, clean and organized.
- TVP (tiener velprobleem) – acne problems.

=== V ===
- vaalie – mildly derogatory term used by people on the coast for a tourist from inland (Root: Old Transvaal province)
- vark – lit. "pig". Identical meaning to the English word in all of its interpretations, i.e.: pig, pork (varkvleis), arsehole (vulgar).
- van die os op die wa af – lit. "from the ox onto the wagon and off". Similar to "speaking of which" and "while we're on the subject"
- van toeka se dae af – lit. "since the olden days". Derived from the acronym "toeka", which is defined as the foundation of God's Word, which means it has been used since biblical times.
- veë jou gat aan dit af – lit. "wiping your arse on it". Refers to blatant ignorance against any person or object, no matter the consequences. Closest English equivalent is: "You don't give a shit."
- vellies – veldskoene, traditional Afrikaans outdoors shoes made from hide
- verkramp – politically conservative or pessimistic, the opposite of verlig, or enlightened
- vetkoek – a deep-fried pastry that can either have a sweet filling of jam, honey, and syrup, or a savory filling of beef, chicken, pork, etc. Though the name literally translates as "fat cake", that name was already reserved by an English dessert, so in order to distinguish between the two very different dishes, vetkoek remains the universal name across all languages.
- viswyf – lit. "fish female", refers to a woman that throws a "bitch-fit" when she doesn't get her way. "Jy gaan soos 'n viswyf tekere!" (You're being really bitchy now!).
- voertsek, voetsek – get lost, buzz off, go away, run, scram, stuff off, bugger off (it can be considered rude, depending on the context) – usually used when referring to an animal. From the Dutch "vort, zeg ik" – used with animals, meaning "Go away!" or "Get moving". Voetsek is considered to be far more assertive than its English counterparts.
- voetjie-voetjie – lit. a game of footsie
- voël – lit. "bird". While the original meaning remains intact, it also refers to a penis (vulgar), due to "eiers" (eggs) being another nickname for testicles.
- voshaarnooi – lit. "a red-headed girl". Derived from the song of the same name, by Afrikaans singer Louis Van Rensburg, the song describes the beauty of a young fiery red-headed girl (voshare = red hair). The original Afrikaans term for a "red-head" is a rooikop.
- Volksie – (pronounced as "folk-see") Is the local name of the Volkswagen Type 1 "Beetle" (based on the German/Afrikaans pronunciation – "folks-vach-en"). It essentially translates to "little Volkswagen". Also known as a "Volla".
- vrek – Afrikaans, meaning an animal dying. Possibly from Dutch verrekken to dislocate? Is considered extremely rude when used to refer to a person that has died, as the person would be likened to a mere animal.
- vroeg ryp, vroeg vrot – lit. "the quicker the fruit ripens, the quicker it will rot". Refers to anything that is being rushed.
- vrot – bad, rotten, putrid, sometimes drunk
- vrotbek – someone who swears a lot or is swearing a lot at the moment, as well as someone with bad breath.
- vry – to make out or courting (equivalent to American "necking", British "snogging" or Australian "pashing")
- Vrystaat vernier – shifting spanner
- vuilbek – lit. "dirty mouth", refers someone who swears a lot or is swearing a lot at the moment.
- vuil uil – lit. "dirty owl", an unsavoury character, a person of ill repute, guilt of transgressions

=== W ===
- waai – Afrikaans for "wave hello/goodbye". Slang for "to go". Durbanites like to say "Hey, let's waai pozzy." = "Let's go home." Also refers to the blowing of wind.
- wakker pies iet - lit. " jy moet wakker pies iet ". Telling someone to be aware of someone or something
- dis n Weber dag/maand/koffie – Afrikaans slang to describe a good day or thing, using Weber. Originated from a High School teachers attitude and the students adopted it.
- waar val jy uit die bus uit/van die bus af? – lit. "Where did you fall off the bus?". Is a question usually asked when the person you are talking to, wasn't paying attention to the topic changing when they joined the discussion, and as a result they usually interrupt the discussion with an off-topic question.
- watookal – lit. "what also all." Whatever.
- wakkerslaap – despite its original Dutch meaning "worry", it can also be used to verbally "wake-up" a drowsy person.
- windgat – lit. "wind hole." A loquatious over-talkative, perhaps bragging person.
- woes – wild, untidy, unkempt or irreverent. A general term pertaining to either a person, behaviour or situation. Also could mean angry, in a rage, or sexually aroused.
- word wakker, die dag word al swakker! – lit. "become awake, the day is getting ever-weaker." A wake-up call in military fashion, usually is accompanied with loud banging on the door.
- wys – multiple meanings – to insult (see tune) or to say e.g. "Yoh, John wys me after I told him to shut up!". Also refers to "wysheid" (wisdom/wise) in a sarcastic tone: "O jy dink jy's wys né! (You think you're smart huh, do you!)

=== Y ===
- yoh – an expression of surprise e.g., "Yoh, that was rude" "Yoh, you gave me a fright!", (Police-chief talking about the poor physique of his policemen): "They should look at our men and say "yoh!".
- ysterperd – "iron horse", describes a motorcycle, specifically a Harley-Davidson-style "full-size" motorcycle. Is derived from the fact that a motorcycle, with all its uses, is the modern day equivalent of a horse-and-rider.
- ystervarkie(s) – lit. "iron piglets". Also known by their English/Australian name "Lamingtons", these are small cubes of sponge cakes dipped in chocolate syrup and covered in desiccated coconut. It takes its Afrikaans name from the ystervark (Afrikaans for porcupine) due to its resemblance to the animal.

=== Z ===
- zap – while the original English usage remains intact, though the term "to shock" is preferred, it also refers to one's obscene usage of the middle finger, while a "double-zap" would be where both middle fingers are extended at the same time.
- zef – from the Ford Zephyr car, cheap to tune up; cool, rough guy; common person; kitsch, trashy
- zol – a homemade cigarette rolled with old newspaper or Rizla pape, possibly marijuana-filled, equivalent to American "doobie"

== Words from Khoi languages ==
- aitsa – is usually used when exclaiming agreement like you would when saying "sweet!", "nice!", "lekker!", and "got it!".
- buchu – a wonderful smelling range of medicinal plants.
- dagga – marijuana (has become a mainstream word in South African English) (from Khoe daxa-b for Leonotis plant)
- eina – exclamation of pain, as in ouch (from Khoekhoe exclamation of pain or surprise)
- goggo – bug (from Khoe xo-xo, creeping things, here the g is pronounced like ch in Scottish loch)
- kaross – garment made of animal skin (from Khoe meaning skin blanket)
- kierie – a walking stick, or cane, usually made of wood. Primarily used by the elderly as general usage of a cane fell out of fashion among younger generations, though people still have a habit of when carrying a stick to use it as a walking stick, even though they don't necessarily need it.

== Words from Xhosa, Tswana, Zulu and other Nguni/Sotho languages ==
The following lists slang borrowings from the Nguni Bantu languages (which include Zulu Sotho and Tswana and Xhosa). They typically occur in use in the South Africa townships, but some have become increasingly popular among white youth. Unless otherwise noted these words do not occur in formal South African English.

- abba – the act of carrying a child on your back. Is a tradition of tribal African women to carry their young hands-free on their backs by literally binding them in a sarong-like garment, emulating the pouch of a Kangaroo.
- Aikhona! – not on your nellie; nice try. Sometimes a strong refusal/disagreement, No!
- tjhaile/tshayile – (pronounced: chai-leh) "time to go home"
- dintshang – “how is it going?” from Sotho and Tswana people
- chaai – used to describe a feeling of loss or disappointment (It is what it is or it's over in other words) e.g. "That test was chaai!" or "i lost my money it's chaai because I won't get it back "
- cherry – "meddie" – "hun" could mean girl or girlfriend e.g. "is that your cherry "
- fede – “what's up?” from Sotho and Tswana people)
- chommie – a friend (similar to English "chum")
- cav – meaning "to see: (the c is pronounced as a dental click). It can be used meaning both "to see" or "to understand" as in "Did you cav that ?" or as in "Do you cav what I am saying?"
- cocopan – small tip truck on rails used in mines (from Nguni nqukumbana, Scotch cart)
- donga – lit. "wall" (Xhosa). Small erosion channel, akin to arroyo in Mexico.
- eish! – an interjection expressing resignation
- fundi – expert (from Nguni "umfundisi" meaning teacher or preacher) – used in mainstream South African English
- faka – to put (pronounced as fuh-kuh) from the common Nguni word meaning the same thing, faka
- gogo/koko – grandmother, elderly woman (from Mbo-Nguni, ugogo)
- hawu! – expression of disbelief, surprise. Pronounced like English "how!". From the Zulu "hawu".
- hayibo! – has no direct English translation. It's used as an exaggerated response to something and can be apply to any situation (from Zulu, 'definitely not').
- indaba – meeting of the community (from Nguni, 'a matter for discussion'); has become a mainstream word in South African English in the sense of consultative conference.
- inyanga – traditional herbalist and healer (compare with sangoma)
- jova – injection, to inject (from Zulu)
- kwedini – a popular word meaning a boy in Xhosa and Zulu
- laduma! – a popular cheer at soccer matches, "he scores!" (literally: "it thunders", in Nguni)
- nca – meaning something is nice or tasty (the nc is a nasalised dental click)
- Vati – water, kasi word for water, also the name of a water purification company from standerton Sakhile
- muti – medicine (from Nguni umuthi) – typically traditional African
- Mzansi – South Africa (uMzantsi in Xhosa means "south"), specifically refers to the South Africa.
- Ngca – (pronounced "Ngc-ah", dental click) an expression of appreciation or admiration, similar to "nice"
- ousie – Term used to refer to a maid, usually a black female; also used by black females to call/refer to each other (from Sesotho and Setswana for 'sister)
- sangoma – traditional healer or diviner
- shongololo (also spelt songalolo) – millipede (from Nguni, ukusonga, 'to roll up')
- Tshisa Nyama – of Xhosa origin, lit means to "burn meat". Is the Zulu equivalent to the braai.
- spaza – an informal trading-post/convenience store found in townships and remote areas (also a term referring to something cheap and nasty – i.e. of poor quality)
- tokoloshe – a dwarf-like water sprite, taken from tokoloshe.
- toyi-toyi – (more commonly spelt toi-toi) protest-dancing; used in mainstream South African English
- tsotsi – gangster, layabout, no gooder from Sotho and Tswana people
- ubuntu – compassion or kindness, humanity, connectedness
- Vuvuzela – a traditional horn made from the hollowed-out horns of a Kudu bull. It produces a monotonous tone and is often used as a summonings. A modernized version is made from plastic and more closely resembles a straight trumpet. The modern version is commonly used by the audience at soccer games, though usage of it has been highly frowned upon and in some cases banned because of noise-regulations, due to its incredibly loud blaring monotonous tone.
- Ntwana yam – A friend of yours
- Ewe – lit. "yes" (Mbo-Nguni)
- wena – Literally "you" (Mbo-Nguni). Commonly used in a sentence "Hayiwena!"

== Slang originating from other countries ==
The following slang words used in South African originated in other parts of the Commonwealth of Nations and subsequently came to South Africa.

- bint – a girl, from Arabic بِنْت. Usually seen as derogatory.
- buck – the main unit of currency: in South Africa the rand, and from the American use of the word for the dollar.
- china – friend, mate (from Cockney rhyming slang china [plate] = "mate").
- chow – to eat
- coaster – a state of affairs that surpasses cool
- pom – name for an English person originating from England
- shab short for shebeen.

== Slang originating from ethnic minorities ==
=== South African Coloured slang ===
The majority of Coloureds in South Africa speak Afrikaans. Those who speak English use the equivalent English words as slang.

- gam – derogatory term for Coloured people in South Africa. Derived from "Gham" or "Ham" referring to Ham in the Old Testament. It is a reference to the children of Noah's son Ham who were illegitimate and cursed into slavery by God.

Could also come from Kxom, which means dirty or soil in San.

=== South African Indian slang ===
- y'all – "you all" appears across all varieties of South African Indian English. Its lexical similarity to the y'all of the United States is attributed to coincidence.

=== South African Jewish slang ===
- Bagel: for an overly materialistic and excessively groomed young man
- chattis, khateis (plural chatteisim, khateisim. Yiddish: "a sinner"): approximately equivalent to "trashy white talk". The word refers particularly to poor, white, Afrikaans-speaking communities with endemic social problems.Example of this or these type of people would be the Cape coloured community of Manenberg or "Chatchies" as its affectionately known. Sometimes used as an ethnic slur against Afrikaners in general. From Talmudic phrase Eyn bor yerey khet – a bor – (uncouth ignoramus) is not afraid of sin. The bor-Boer assonance gives a case for quibble: if not afraid of sin must be therefore a sinner.
- Kugel: an overly materialistic and excessively groomed young woman
- Peruvian / Peruvnik: a low-class, unmannered and unsophisticated person regardless of wealth, usually Jewish. The etymology is unclear. (Theories: (a) Yiddish corruption of Parvenu; (b) derives from an acronym for "Polish and Russian Union", supposedly a Jewish club founded in Kimberley in the 1870s, according to Bradford's Dictionary of South African English.) The more assimilated and established Jews from Germany and England looked down on this group, and their descendants remain stigmatised.
- Schwarzer: Yiddish / German for "black" – a black person
- shiksa: as in other Jewish communities, this means "non-Jewish girl". Traditionally "slave-girl", from the Yiddish version of the Hebrew word for "dirty, unclean, loathsome" In South Africa, however, it has the additional meaning of a "female domestic worker".

== Example ==
South African English
An example of South African English regionalisms/slang (second language speaker)

Jinne man, just put on your tekkies and your costume, don't be dof! We're going to walk to the beach and then go for a swim, if you want to come with you better hurry up, chyna. Ag nee, I stepped on a shongololo, I just bought new tekkies the other day! You know what, lets just forget about the beach and have a braai instead, all we need is some meat, mieliepap, some cooldrinks, maybe a brinjal and some other veggies. And if someone can bring some biscuits for a banofi pie, that would be great. Hey bru, it's a lekker day for a jol today, ek sê! I'm warning you my dad won't tolerate any gesuipery, he'll klap you stukkend! Is it? Ja, he's kwaai! He was tuning me just now from his bakkie my bokkie is a soutie and a rooinek. Eish! Well at least he's duidelik.

== See also ==
- Gayle language
- Languages of South Africa
- List of lexical differences in South African English
- South African English
