= Stuur Groete aan Mannetjies Roux =

- Directed by: Paul Eilers
- Produced by: Piet de Jager, Salmon de Jager
- Starring: Ian Roberts; Anna-Mart van der Merwe; Lizelle de Klerk; Elton Landrew; Laurika Rauch
- Cinematography: Tom Marais
- Edited by: Mandy Roberts
- Music by: Jaconell Mouton
- Production company: Bosbok Ses Films
- Release date: December 2013
- Country: South Africa
- Language: Afrikaans

Stuur Groete aan Mannetjies Roux (English: "Send greetings to Mannetjies Roux") is a 2013 film in Afrikaans about a teenage girl who visits her aunt and uncle on their Karoo farm during the school vacation. She makes a series of discoveries: she finds out who she really is and where she comes from. Three visitors in one week change her life forever, and her uncle's obsession with the try by Mannetjies Roux is finally explained.

The film has nothing to do with the life of South African rugby player Mannetjies Roux, but rather with the try which he scored in 1962 in Bloemfontein against the British Lions.

The film is based on the title and lyrics of one of Laurika Rauch's most famous songs "Stuur Groete aan Mannetjies Roux". The song describes life on the uncle's farm from the girl's point-of-view, most notably the uncle's Diesel-powered car, the longing for rain and the try scored by Mannetjies Roux.

== Main actors ==
- Ian Roberts as Oom Frans
- Anna-Mart van der Merwe as Tante Koba
- Lizelle de Klerk as Engela
- Elton Landrew as Toemaar
- Steffie le Roux as Anna
- Wilhelm van der Walt as Anton
- Ilse Oppelt as Katie
- Laurika Rauch as Engela (as an adult)

== See also ==
- List of Afrikaans-language films
