= Ian Roberts (South African actor) =

South African actor, playwright, singer (born 1951)

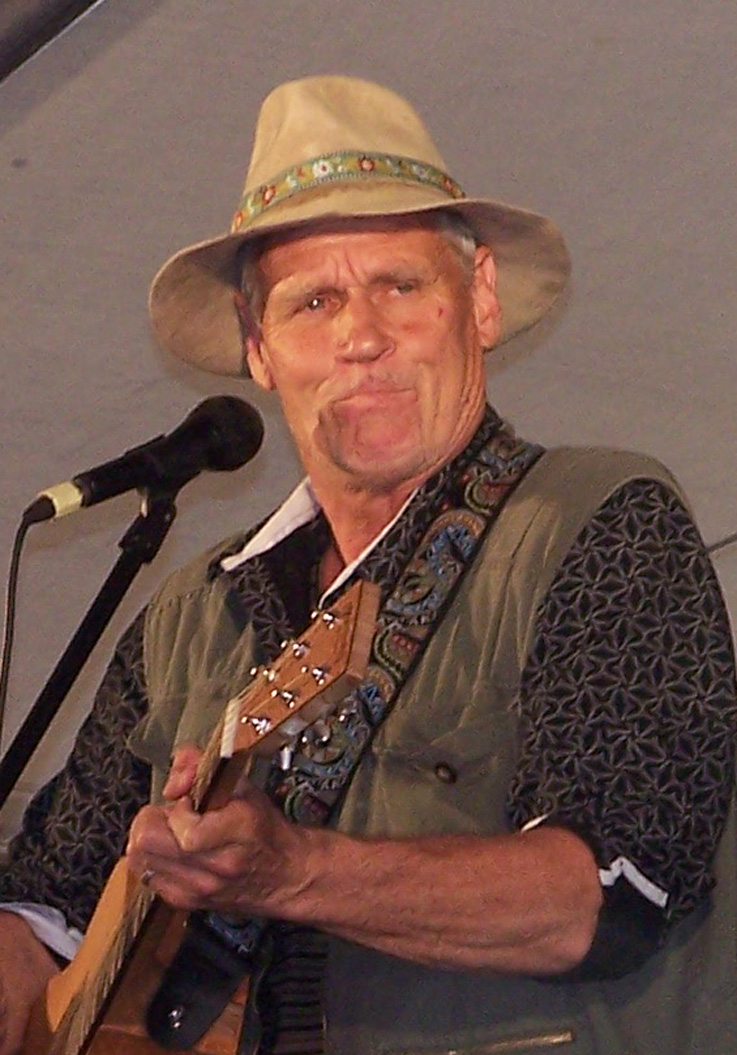
- Roberts performing at the Rittelfees in Vredendal, Western Cape, in 2003
- Born: 30 November 1951 (age 74); Fort Beaufort, Cape Province, Union of South Africa
- Education: Rhodes University
- Occupations: Actor; playwright; singer
- Spouse: Michelle Botes (divorced 1999)
- Children: 4
- Musical career
- Years active: 1980–present

Ian Roberts (born 30 November 1951) is a South African actor, playwright and singer. A native English speaker, he is also fluent in Afrikaans and Xhosa.

== Early life ==
Roberts was born in Fort Beaufort in the Cape Province, Union of South Africa, and grew up on his father's citrus farm near the town. He attended St. Andrew's Preparatory School and St. Andrew's College in Grahamstown. After completing high school, he performed his compulsory national service in the South African Army, which he completed in 1971.

After holding a variety of jobs and taking a course in photography at the Port Elizabeth Technical College from 1973 to 1975, Roberts enrolled at Rhodes University in 1976 to pursue a Bachelor of Arts degree majoring in speech, drama and social anthropology.

== Acting career ==
Roberts became a well-known figure in South African for his role as Boet in a long-running series of television advertisements for Castrol motor oil. This character, along with others such as Swaer and Moegoe, has also appeared in M-Net's comedy series Kalahari Oasis and in his band, Radio Kalahari Orkes.

In the Oscar-winning South African film, Tsotsi, Roberts played the role of a police captain.

He was married to South African actress Michelle Botes, but the couple divorced in 1999. They had two children.

== Filmography ==
List of performances by Ian Roberts in film
Year	Title	Role	Other notes
1987	Jane and the Lost City	Carl	
1989	Arende	Sloet Steenkamp	
1989	A Private Life	Sergeant Smit	Television Movie
1992	The Power of One	Hoppie Gruenewald	
1993	Triptiek	–	Television Series
1993	Daisy de Melker	Sid de Melker	Television Movie
1995	Cry, the Beloved Country	Evans	
1996	Rhodes	Colenbrander	Television Miniseries
1997	Mandela and de Klerk	Kobie Coetsee	Television Movie
1998	Paljas	Frans	
1998	Tarzan and the Lost City	Captain Dooley	
1998	Sweepers	Yager	
1999	A Reasonable Man	Chris Van Rooyen	
2000	I Dreamed of Africa	Mike Donovan	
2001	Malunde	Kobus	
2001	Askari	Ripshaw	
2002	Promised Land	Gerhard Snyman	
2003	Hoodlum & Son	Earl	
2004	King Solomon's Mines	Sir Henry	Television Movie
2004	Red Dust	Piet Muller	
2005	Wah-Wah	John Traherne	
2005	Tsotsi	Captain Smit	
2005	3 Needles	Hallyday	
2006	Number 10	Marius Kramer	
2008	Bakgat!	Basjan Du Preez	
2010	Bakgat! II	Basjan Du Preez	
2013	Bakgat! tot die mag 3	Basjan Du Preez	
2013	Stuur Groete aan Mannetjies Roux	Oom Frans	
2016	Cape Town	Gerbrand Vos	Television Miniseries
2017	Van der Merwe	Oupa Schalk van der Merwe	

In addition to the above, Roberts has played leading roles in Afrikaans-language television series, including Sloet Steenkamp in Arende ("Eagles") and Jack Degenaar in Arsenaal ("Arsenal"), as well as a supporting role in Kwelaman (1986). He has also written a number of scripts, including Honeytown 1 and the musical Palang van Dwaal ("Palang from Dwaal").
