= List of South African English regionalisms =

This is a list of words used in mainstream South African English but not usually found in other dialects of the English language. For internationally common English words of South African origin, see List of English words of Afrikaans origin.

== A-B ==
aikhona
(Informal) meaning ''no'' or ''hell no''.
Amasi
Fermented milk, sometimes called maas.
bakkie
A utility truck or pickup truck. Can also mean a small basin or other container.
bergie
(Informal) refers to a particular subculture of vagrants in Cape Town (from Afrikaans berg (mountain), originally referring to vagrants who sheltered in the forests of Table Mountain). Increasingly used in other cities to mean a vagrant of any description. The term hobo is also used for homeless vagrants.
bioscope, bio
Cinema; movie theatre (now dated).
biltong
Cured meat, similar to jerky.
bladdy
(Informal) occasionally heard South African version of bloody (the predominantly heard form), from the Cape Coloured/Afrikaans blerrie, itself a corruption of the English word.
boerewors
Traditional sausage (from Afrikaans "farmer’s sausage"), usually made with a mixture of coarse-ground beef and pork and seasoned with spices such as coriander. Droëwors is boerewors with vinegar added as a preservative that has been cured similar to biltong.
boy
In addition to its normal meaning, an archaic and derogatory term for a male domestic servant of colour, for example, a gardener may be called a garden boy (not uncommon).
braai
A barbecue, to barbecue.
buck
A rand, referring to the Springbok that is featured on the South African R1-coin (one rand coin).
bundu, bundus
A wilderness region, remote from cities (from Shona bundo, meaning grasslands).
bunny chow
Loaf of bread filled with curry, speciality of Durban, particularly Indian South Africans also called a kota by black South Africans, on account of it commonly being sold in a quarter loaf of bread (see also spatlo).
bokkie
Originally referring to a baby antelope. It refers to a (often Afrikaner) white girl, and it can also be applied as a pet-name between lovers.

== C-E ==
cafe
When pronounced /kæˈfiː/ refers to a convenience store not a coffee shop (originally such stores sold coffee and other basic items) called a tea room by Durbanites.
checkers
A plastic carrier bag, named after the South African grocery chain ‘Checkers’.
china
(Informal) a friend, abbreviated Cockney rhyming slang, "china plate", for "mate" e.g. "Howzit my China?"
circle
Used to refer to the shape but also used to refer to a traffic roundabout, given its circular shape.
Coloured
Refers to typically brown skinned South Africans of mixed European and Khoisan or black and/or Malay ancestry, a definition formally codified under apartheid.
combi/kombi/coombi
A mini-van, people-carrier, especially referring to the Volkswagen Type 2 and its descendants. Not usually used in the context of minibus taxis, which are referred to as taxis.
cool drink, cold drink
Soft drink, fizzy drink (not necessarily chilled). Groovy was used to refer to canned soft drinks (after one of the first brands to introduce the container to South Africa) :may refer to a bribe, typically to a traffic cop.
creepy crawly Kreepy Krauly
Automated pool cleaner.
dagga
(Pronounced /dæxə/ or more commonly, /dʌxə/) marijuana.
donga
An erosion ditch of the type found in South African topography (from Zulu, wall).
draadkar/draad-kar
A toy car which is constructed out of throw-away steel wires.
entjie
A cigarette.
erf
(Plural erfs, in English, erven/erve in Dutch/Afrikaans) a plot of land in an urban area (from Cape Dutch).

== F-J ==
geyser
A domestic hot water heater, particularly a storage hot water heater.
girl
In addition to its normal meaning, archaic and derogatory term for a female domestic servant of colour. Superseded by "maid", and more recently "domestic worker" or "domestic".
gogga
(Pronounced /ˈxɔːxə/, the latter similar to the Afrikaans pronunciation) a creepy crawly or an insect.
gogo
Zulu word meaning grandmother/grandma, also used as a general term of respect for women of appropriate age. Became part of the iconic slogan Yebo Gogo (Yes, Grandma) from the South African cellular service-provider Vodacom.

gogo

In Tswana has the same meaning as gogga - it refers to a creepy crawly or an insect.

homeland
Under apartheid, typically referred to a self-governing "state" for black South Africans.
howzit
(Colloquial) hello, how are you, good morning (despite being a contracted of 'how is it going', howzit is almost exclusively a greeting, and seldom a question).
imbizo
A meeting or conference, similar to a legotla or indaba, formerly called a bosberaad (Afrikaans for bush meeting): often a retreat for senior government and political officials to discuss policy.
is it?
(Colloquial) Is that so? An all purpose exclamative, can be used in any context where "really?", "uh-huh", etc. would be appropriate, e.g. "I'm feeling pretty tired." "Is it?".
indaba
A conference (from Zulu, "a matter for discussion")
jam
(Informal) can also be referred to as having a good time, partying, drinking etc. e.g. "Let's jam soon".
ja
(Colloquial) yes (from Afrikaans "yes"). Pronounced "ya".
janee, ja-nee, ja/nee, ja nee
(Colloquial) meaning yes/agreed, in response to a question: "Ja no, that's fine." (From Afrikaans "ja nee", which is used in the same sense).
jol
(Informal, pronounced /dʒɔːl/) another term more commonly used for partying and drinking. e.g. "It was a jol" or "I am jolling with you soon." Can also mean having a lighthearted fling or affair ("I'm jolling that cherrie").
just now
Idiomatically used to mean soon, later, in a short while, or a short time ago, but unlike the UK not immediately.

== K-L ==
kaffir
(Derogatory/offensive, pronounced /kæfə/) a black-skinned person (from Arabic kafir meaning non-believer) used as a racial slur.
kif
(Informal) indicating appreciation, like "cool".
kip
A nap.
Klaas Vakie
The Sandman.
koki, koki pen
(Pronounced /koʊkiː/) a fibre-tip pen or sharpie (from a defunct local brand name).
koppie
A small hill, (also Afrikaans for a cup/mug).
koeksister
A Dutch-derived sweet pastry dessert dipped in a syrup. Pastry is traditionally shaped in the form of a French braid. The name ''koeksister'' translates as ''Cake-sister''.
lapa
Permanent, semi-open thatched structure used for entertaining.
lekker
(Informal, pronounced /lɛkə/) nice, pleasant, enjoyable (from Afrikaans "nice").
lappie
(Informal) a small dishcloth used for cleaning, as opposed to a dishcloth or tea towel.
laaitie
(Informal) one's own child or younger brother, specifically refers to a young boy, or to refer to a young person as a lightweight or inexperienced in something particular.
location, kasi
An apartheid-era urban area populated by Blacks, Cape Coloureds, or Indians. It was replaced by "township" in common usage amongst Whites but is still widely used by Blacks in the form of kasi.

== M-N ==
matric
School-leaving certificate or the final year of high school or a student in the final year, short for matriculation.
mielie, mealie
An ear of maize (from Afrikaans mielie).
mieliemeel, mealie meal
Used for both cornmeal (maize meal) and the traditional porridge made from it similar to polenta, the latter also commonly known by the Afrikaans word pap, and is a traditional staple food of black South Africans.
Melktert/Milktart
A Dutch custard-tart with a strong milk flavor, usually sprinkled with cinnamon on top.
monkey's wedding
A sunshower.
Moola
Currency used by the now-defunct South African mobile-data service Mxit; money in general.
morgan
A traditional unit of measurement of land area of Dutch origin, that is approximately equal to two acres.
muti
Any sort of medicine but especially something unfamiliar (Zulu for traditional medicine).
Mzansi.
Another name for South Africa, from the Xhosa word for "South".
naartjie
A mandarin orange (from Indonesian via Afrikaans), a tangerine in Britain.
now now
(Colloquial) derived from the Afrikaans ''nou-nou'' (which can be used both in future- and immediate past-tense) idiomatically used to mean soon, but not immediately (sooner than just now in South Africa, but similar to just now in the United Kingdom).

== O-R ==
outjie
A person, similar to "bloke" (man).
ousie
Maid/housekeeper, from the Afrikaans ou sis, originally referred to an older domestic worker.
pap
Porridge-like dish made from maize meal (cornmeal).
poep
Afrikaans translation of the English word fart but is commonly used in many South African cultures.
poephol
Crude Afrikaans word translation of the English word ' 'arsehole' ' but is commonly used as an insult in both English and Afrikaans.
poppie
(Informal) a ditzy woman (derogatory term), from the Afrikaans word pop, meaning a doll.
potjie
A cast iron dutch oven.
robot
Besides the standard meaning, in South Africa this is also used for traffic lights. The etymology of the word derives from a description of early traffic lights as robot policemen, which then got truncated with time.
rondavel
Round free-standing hut-like structure, usually with a thatched roof.
rusk
A type of bread or pastry that was traditionally dried to extend its shelf life, and that is dipped in tea or coffee.

== S ==
samp
Dried and roughly ground maize kernels, similar to American grits.
sarmie
A sandwich.
samoosa
A small triangular pastry of Indian origin. South African spelling and pronunciation of samosa.
Sangoma
A traditional African healer.
shame
An exclamation denoting sympathy as in "shame, you poor thing, you must be cold". Also used to describe a ''cuteness factor''.
sharp, shapp, shapp-shapp, pashasha, pashash
General positive exclamation meaning "OK", "all's good", "no worries", or "goodbye". Often accompanied by a thumbs-up gesture. A similar, more recent term used in Cape Town is aweh. Also means intelligent (that laaitie is sharp).
shebeen
(Also used in Ireland and Scotland) an illegal drinking establishment, nowadays meaning any legal, informal bar, especially in townships.
shongololo, songololo
Millipede (from Zulu and Xhosa, ukushonga, to roll up).
skyfie
Segment of an orange or other citrus fruit.
snackwich
A Jaffle-style toasted sandwich made in an electric toaster.
sosatie
A kebab on a stick.
soutie
Derogatory term for an English-speaking South African, from the Afrikaans soutpiel (literally "salty penis"), which referred to British colonial settlers who had one foot in England, one foot in South Africa and, consequently, their manhood dangling in the Atlantic Ocean.
spanspek
A cantaloupe.
spaza
An informal trading post/convenience store found in townships and remote areas.
standard
Besides other meanings, used to refer to a school grade higher than grades 1 and 2 (now defunct).
State President
Head of state between 1961 and 1994 - the position is now the President of South Africa.
Stompie
A discarded cigarette / cigarette butt-end. Also another name for a rumour that is generally made up and not reliable.

== T-Z ==
tackies, takkies, tekkies
Sneakers, trainers.
tea room
Convenience store, used by Durbanites (see also cafe).
thumb suck
An estimate that is based on a pure guess and not based on any sort of analysis.
tickey box, ticky-box, tiekieboks
A payphone, derived from "tickey" coin (threepenny coin minted in 1892), as one had to insert a coin to make a call. Archaic, and superseded by public phone and payphone.
town
The Central Business District (CBD) of a town or city, used without the definite article ("let's go to town to buy clothes"). CBD tends to be used in more formal contexts.
township
Residential area, historically reserved for black Africans, Coloureds or Indians under apartheid. Sometimes also used to describe impoverished formally designated residential areas largely populated by black Africans, established post-Apartheid. Formerly called a location. Also has a distinct legal meaning in South Africa's system of land title, with no racial connotations.
veld
Virgin bush, especially grassland or wide open rural spaces. Afrikaans for field.
vetkoek
Afrikaner deep fried dough bread.

== See also ==
- List of South African slang words
