= Mannetjies Roux =

South African rugby union player

- Born: François Du Toit Roux; 12 April 1939 (age 87) Victoria West, Northern Cape, South Africa

Rugby union career
- Position: Centre
Amateur team(s)
Years	Team	Apps	(Points)
1960	Western Province		
1961	Northern Transvaal		
1965	Griqualand West		
International career
Years	Team	Apps	(Points)
1960–70	South Africa	27	(30)

Francois Du Toit "Mannetjies" Roux (born 12 April 1939) is a former South African rugby player. He was capped 27 times; 6 times at wing and 21 times at centre, scoring 6 tries.

== Rugby career ==
Born in Victoria West and educated at Paarl Boys High, he went to Stellenbosch University; an institution known for serving as a conveyor belt of future Springboks. Later on he joined the South African Air Force in Pretoria where he was a Harvard instructor.

He won his first cap, at wing, against Wales in Cardiff in 1960, which the Springboks won 3-0 thanks to a Keith Oxlee penalty. The selectors chose him as a wing on occasions as they thought him difficult to combine with in mid-field.

He possessed a great deal of pace and was a ferocious defender, despite his lack of size. He was perhaps best known for his tackle on England and British Lions flyhalf Richard Sharp, while playing for Northern Transvaal (the Blue Bulls) in 1962, which broke Sharp's jaw or cheekbone.

Controversy seemed to follow him almost throughout his career, with Roux achieving notoriety on the demo-ridden 1969/70 Springbok tour of the United Kingdom for kicking one protester in the backside and hurling the ball at another.

== Retirement ==
Retiring in 1970, after he led Griqualand West to only their third Currie Cup title to date (having also represented Western Province at the start of his career, in addition to Northern Transvaal), he eventually returned to the town of his birth.

He and his wife Charlotte are currently running a shop and museum called Victoria Trading Post in Victoria West.

== Trivia ==
According to legend, he got his nickname (originally "Mannetjie", Afrikaans for little man) from a domestic worker, who apparently found his cockiness quite amusing. The "s" at the end was added only much later by his wife. The addition of the "s" is affectionate. During a conversation, Mannetjies referred to the house in Victoria West where he played as a young boy. The high stoep (porch) around the house made the domestic worker to warn him with “Mannetjie, pasop dat jy nie daar afval nie” ("Mannetjie watch out that you don’t fall down from there"). Follow link to see picture

The Afrikaans artist Laurika Rauch has a well-known song with the title "Stuur groete aan Mannetjies Roux" ("Greetings to Mannetjies Roux") and a film based on the song. As a tribute, she performed the song to him (who was standing alongside her) at a Blue Bulls vs Stormers Super Rugby-game at Loftus Versfeld Stadium in 2011.

== See also ==
- 1962 British Lions tour to South Africa
- 1969–70 South Africa rugby union tour
