= South African English =

Variety of the English language

- Region: South Africa
- Ethnicity: South Africans
- Language family: Indo-European: Germanic; West Germanic; North Sea Germanic; Anglo-Frisian; Anglic; English; South African English
- Early forms: Proto-Indo-European: Proto-Germanic; Old English; Middle English; Early Modern English; late 18th century British English; 19th century British English; early 20th century British English
- Writing system: Latin (English alphabet); Unified English Braille

Official status
- Official language in: South Africa; Lesotho
- Regulated by: English Academy of Southern Africa

Language codes
- ISO 639-3: –
- Glottolog: sout3331
- IETF: en-ZA

Geographical distribution of English in South Africa: proportion of the population that speaks English at home 0–20% 20–40% 40–60% 60–80% 80–100%

Geographical distribution of English in South Africa: density of English home-language speakers. The four high-density clusters correspond to the locations of Pretoria and Johannesburg, Durban, Gqeberha and Cape Town (clockwise). <1 /km² 1–3 /km² 3–10 /km² 10–30 /km² 30–100 /km² 100–300 /km² 300–1000 /km² 1000–3000 /km² >3000 /km²

South African English (SAfE, SAfEn, SAE, en-ZA) (Note: en-ZA Afrikaans: Suid Afrikaans Engels is the language code for South African English, as defined by ISO standards (see ISO 639-1 and ISO 3166-1 alpha-2) and Internet standards (see IETF language tag).) is the set of English language dialects native to South Africans.

== History ==
British settlers first arrived in the South African region in 1795, when they established a military holding operation at the Cape Colony. The goal of this first endeavour was to gain control of a key Cape sea route, not to establish a permanent settler colony. Full control of the colony was wrested from the Batavian Republic following the Battle of Blaauwberg in 1806. The first major influx of English speakers arrived in 1820. About 5,000 British settlers, mostly rural or working class, settled in the Eastern Cape. Though the British were a minority colonist group (the Dutch had been in the region since 1652 when traders from the Dutch East India Company developed an outpost), the Cape Colony governor, Lord Charles Somerset, declared English an official language in 1822. To spread the influence of English in the colony, officials began to recruit British schoolmasters and Scottish clergy to occupy positions in the education and church systems. Another group of English speakers arrived from Britain in the 1840s and 1850s, along with the Natal settlers. These individuals were largely "standard speakers" like retired military personnel and aristocrats. A third wave of English settlers arrived between 1875 and 1904, and brought with them a diverse variety of English dialects. These last two waves did not have as large an influence on South African English (SAE), for "the seeds of development were already sown in 1820". However, the Natal wave brought nostalgia for British customs and helped to define the idea of a "standard" variety that resembled Southern British English.

When the Union of South Africa was formed in 1910, English and Dutch were the official state languages, although Afrikaans effectively replaced Dutch in 1925. After 1994, these two languages along with nine other Southern Bantu languages achieved equal official status.

SAE is an extraterritorial (ET) variety of English, or a language variety that has been transported outside its mainland home. More specifically, SAE is a Southern hemisphere ET originating from later English colonisation in the 18th and 19th centuries (Zimbabwean, Australian, and New Zealand English are also Southern hemisphere ET varieties). SAE resembles British English more closely than it does American English due to the close ties that South African colonies maintained with the mainland in the 19th and 20th centuries. However, the influence of American pop culture around the world made American English more familiar in South Africa, with some American lexical items becoming alternatives to comparable British terms.

== White South African English ==
Several white South African English varieties have emerged, accompanied by varying levels of perceived social prestige. Roger Lass describes white South African English as a system of three sub-varieties spoken primarily by White South Africans, called "The Great Trichotomy" (a term first used to categorise Australian English varieties and subsequently applied to South African English). In this classification, the "Cultivated" variety closely approximates England's standard Received Pronunciation and is associated with the upper class; the "General" variety is a social indicator of the middle class and is the common tongue; and the "Broad" variety is most associated with the working class, low socioeconomic status, and little education. These three sub-varieties, Cultivated, General, and Broad, have also sometimes been called "Conservative SAE", "Respectable SAE", and "Extreme SAE", respectively. Broad White SAE closely approximates the second-language variety of (Afrikaans-speaking) Afrikaners called Afrikaans English. This variety has been stigmatised by middle- and upper-class SAE speakers (primarily those of British origin) and is considered a vernacular form of SAE.

=== Phonology ===
==== Vowels ====
- Allophonic variation in the KIT vowel (from Wells' 1982 lexical sets). In some contexts, such as after /h/, the KIT vowel is pronounced [ɪ]; before tautosyllabic /l/ it is pronounced [ɤ]; and in other contexts it is pronounced [ə]. This feature is not present in Conservative SAE, and may have resulted from a vocalic chain shift in White SAE.
- Pronunciation of the FLEECE vowel with the long monophthongal [iː]. In contrast, other Southern Hemisphere Englishes like Australian English and New Zealand English have diphthongised FLEECE ([ɪi ~ əi]).
- Back PALM, with lip rounding in the broader dialects ([ɑː] or [ɒː]). This differs from Australian English and New Zealand English, which have central [aː] instead.
- The trap-bath split, as in New Zealand English and partially also Australian English.
- LOT is short, open, weakly rounded, and centralised, around [ɒ̽].
- FOOT is short, half-closed back and centralised, around [ʊ].
- NURSE tends to resemble the Received Pronunciation non-rhotic [ɜː] among Conservative SAE speakers, while the vowel is front, half-close, centralised [øː] in other varieties.

==== Consonants ====
- In Conservative and Respectable SAE, /h/ is the voiceless glottal fricative [h]. In Extreme SAE, /h/ has a more breathy-voiced pronunciation, [ɦ], likely as a result of a Dutch/Afrikaans substrate. /h/ is sometimes deleted in Extreme SAE where it is preserved in Conservative and Respectable SAE. For instance, when it occurs initially in stressed syllables in words like "house", it is deleted in Extreme SAE.
- Conservative SAE is completely non-rhotic like Received Pronunciation, while Respectable SAE has sporadic moments of rhoticity. These rhotic moments generally occur in /r/-final words. More frequent rhoticity is a marker of Extreme SAE.
- Unaspirated voiceless plosives (like /p/, /t/, and /k/) in stressed word-initial environments.
- Yod-assimilation: tune and dune tend to be realised as [t͡ʃʉːn] and [d͡ʒʉːn], instead of the Received Pronunciation [tjuːn] and [djuːn].

== Black South African English ==
Black South African English, or BSAE, is spoken by individuals whose first language is an indigenous African tongue. BSAE is considered a "new" English because it has emerged through the education system among second-language speakers in places where English is not the majority language. At least two sociolinguistic variants have been definitively studied on a post-creole continuum for the second-language Black South African English spoken by most Black South Africans: a high-end, prestigious "acrolect" and a more middle-ranging, mainstream "mesolect". The "basilect" variety is less similar to the colonial language (natively-spoken English), while the "mesolect" is somewhat more so. Historically, BSAE has been considered a "non-standard" variety of English, inappropriate for formal contexts and influenced by indigenous African languages.

According to the Central Statistical Services, as of 1994 about seven million black people spoke English in South Africa. BSAE originated in the South African school system when the 1953 Bantu Education Act mandated the use of native African languages in the classroom. When this law was established, most of the native English-speaking teachers were removed from schools. This limited the exposure that black students received to standard varieties of English. As a result, the English spoken in black schools developed distinctive patterns of pronunciation and syntax, leading to the formation of BSAE. Some of these characteristic features can be linked to the mother tongues of the early BSAE speakers. The policy of mother tongue promotion in schools ultimately failed, and in 1979, the Department of Bantu Education allowed schools to choose their own language of instruction. English was largely the language of choice because it was viewed as a key tool of social and economic advancement. BSAE has contrasting pronunciation and organisation of vowels and consonants compared to the ones in standard English. For instance, "it lacks the tense/lax contrast and central vowels in the mesolectal variety."

=== Classification ===
The difference between Black and White South Africans is based on their ethnic backgrounds, with them, as BSAE, being originally the first indigenous people that made a ''new'' English South Africa and developing speaking their tongue version of English and deciding not to speak South Africa's native language of English, which is mostly exclusive for them due to it not being the majority language. In SAE it is primarily used for publicising the differences between British and other forms of tongue speaking for native speakers in various communities of South Africa.

The local native language of Black South African "new" English would lean more on the syllable side and would lean less on stress timing; due to this, the speech of the language would be affected by the length of vowel deduction in "new" English.

=== Phonology ===
BSAE emerged from the influence of local native languages on the British English variety often taught in South African schools. After dispersing BSAE has been seen as three distinct subvarieties: the basilect, mesolect, and acrolect. Not much has yet been studied on the subvarieties of BSAE, and the distinctions between them are not yet fully defined. However, there are some notable pronunciation differences in the mesolect and acrolect.

The vowels in BSAE can be realised as five key phonemes: /i/, pronounced in words like "FLEECE" or KIT, /u/ in "FOOT" or "GOOSE", /ɛ/ in "TRAP", "DRESS", or "NURSE", /ɔ/ in LOT or FORCE, and /a/ as in CAR. /i/ may occasionally be pronounced [ɪ] in the acrolectal variety, though there is no consistent change among speakers. One difference in the acrolect in comparison to the mesolect is that it often uses [ʌ] in place of [a].

In addition, many vowels that are normally diphthongs in most varieties are monophthongs in BSAE. For example, "FACE" in General White SAE is typically pronounced as /feɪs/, but in BSAE is typically pronounced /fɛs/.

=== Grammar ===
Black South African English analysis has not been researched or utilised enough due to its contrasting methods to Southern British norms. BSAE has contrasting pronunciation and organisation of vowels and consonants compared to the ones in more commonly used languages such as other varieties of English. Due to English being an official language of South Africa, dialects that have contrary methods in language and pronunciation to English become isolated from the speech in that area. For instance, "it lacks the tense/lax contrast and central vowels in the mesolectal variety."

In Black South African English, the length of vowels is changeable, and vowel length can be understood as stress placement, with some deviation from Standard English. An example of this is in the word "sevénty", which has primary stress on the penultimate, rather than the initial, syllable.

Additionally, BSAE differs from other forms of dialect by "having shorter tone/information units and having lower pitch and decrease intensity as the sentence concludes."

Certain words such as "maybe" are used as conditional words that imply the result of something if a thing or event were to happen. Another distinctive trait of BSAE is the use of the word "that" as a complementiser. BSAE also has a high frequency of the retention of question word order, 0.86 per 1000 words.

Other findings show that the Cultural Linguistic explorations of World Englishes have been evaluating BSAE based on its cognitive sociolinguistic principles. It is a language that is still being studied due to its strong cultural and traditional ties to its mother tongues.

=== History ===
Historically, BSAE has been considered a "non-standard" variety of English, perceived as inappropriate for formal contexts, and influenced by indigenous African languages.

BSAE, or Black South African English, has its roots in European colonialism of the African continent in the 19th century. As a result of English being pushed by the colonisers of the region, the British, English became widespread in the South African region after it became necessary for indigenous African communities to use for success under the British. Much like in other colonies of the British, English became a necessity for advancement and economic security in the colony for indigenous Africans.

According to the Central Statistical Services, as of 1994, about seven million black people spoke English in South Africa. BSAE originated in the South African school system when the 1953 Bantu Education Act mandated the use of native African languages in the classroom. When this law was established, most of the native English-speaking teachers were removed from schools. This limited the exposure that black students received to standard varieties of English. As a result, the English spoken in black schools developed distinctive patterns of pronunciation and syntax, leading to the formation of BSAE. Some of these characteristic features can be linked to the mother tongues of the early BSAE speakers. The policy of mother tongue promotion in schools ultimately failed, and in 1979, the Department of Bantu Education allowed schools to choose their own language of instruction. English was largely the language of choice because it was viewed as a key tool of social and economic advancement.

=== Geography ===
South Africa occupies the southern area of Africa, its coastline stretching more than 2,850 kilometers (1,770 miles) from the desert border within Namibia on the Atlantic (western) coast southwards around the tip of Africa and then northeast to the border with Mozambique on the Indian Ocean. The low-lying coastal zone is narrow for much of that distance, soon giving way to a mountainous escarpment (Great Escarpment) that separates the coast from the high inland plateau. In some places, notably the province of KwaZulu-Natal in the east, a greater distance separates the coast from the escarpment. Although much of the country is classified as semi-arid, it has considerable variation in climate as well as topography. The total land area is 1,220,813 km^{2} (471,359 sq mi). It has the 23rd largest Exclusive Economic Zone of 1,535,538 km^{2} (592,875 sq mi).

The South African Central Plateau only contains two major rivers: The Limpopo and The Orange (with its tributary, the Vaal). These rivers mainly flow across the central places in the east and west off the coast until they reach the Atlantic Ocean through the Namibian border.

== Indian South African English ==
Indian South African English (ISAE) is a sub-variety that developed among the descendants of Indian immigrants to South Africa. The Apartheid policy, in effect from 1948 to 1991, prevented Indian children from publicly interacting with people of English heritage. This separation caused an Indian variety to develop independently from white South African English, though with phonological and lexical features still fitting under the South African English umbrella. Indian South African English includes a "basilect", "mesolect", and "acrolect". These terms describe varieties of a given language on a spectrum of similarity to the colonial version of that language: the "acrolect" being the most similar. Today, basilect speakers are generally older non-native speakers with little education; acrolect speakers closely resemble colonial native English speakers, with a few phonetic/syntactic exceptions; and mesolect speakers fall somewhere in-between. A significant factor in the development of ISAE is the linguistic background of the early immigrants. While often referred to locally as "Hindustani," the primary North Indian language brought by indentured labourers (predominantly from Bihar and Uttar Pradesh via Calcutta between 1860 and 1911) was identified by linguist Rajend Mesthrie as South African Bhojpuri (SABh), a koiné formed from Bhojpuri and Awadhi languages. As this language declined throughout the 20th century and speakers shifted to English, SABh likely served as a substrate, influencing the phonology, lexicon, and syntax of the emerging Indian South African English variety, alongside influences from other Indian languages like Tamil, Telugu, and Gujarati spoken by other immigrant groups. In recent decades, the dialect has come much closer to the standard language through the model taught in schools. The result is a variety of English which mixes features of Indian, South African, Standard British, creole, and foreign language learning Englishes in a unique and fascinating way.

ISAE resembles Indian English in some respects, possibly because the varieties contain speakers with shared mother tongues or because early English teachers were brought to South Africa from India, or both. Four prominent education-related lexical features shared by ISAE and Indian English are: tuition(s), which means "extra lessons outside school that one pays for" (i.e. "tutoring" in other varieties of English); further studies, which means "higher education"; alphabets, which means "the alphabet, letters of the alphabet"; and by-heart, which means "to learn off by heart"; these items show the influence of Indian English teachers in South Africa. Phonologically, ISAE also shares several similarities with Indian English, though certain common features are decreasing in the South African variety. For instance, consonant retroflexion in phonemes like /ḍ/ and strong aspiration in consonant production (common in North Indian English) are present in both varieties, but declining in ISAE. Syllable-timed rhythm, instead of stress-timed rhythm, is still a prominent feature in both varieties, especially in more colloquial sub-varieties.

== Coloured South African English ==
About 20% of all coloured people in South Africa speak English as a home language. They are primarily concentrated in the provinces of KwaZulu-Natal and northeastern parts of the Eastern Cape in the former Transkei with some transplants being found in Johannesburg.

Many people from these regions migrated to Durban and Pietermaritzburg, where the most Anglophone coloureds can be found.

Anglophone coloureds with European heritage have ancestry mostly from the British Isles, which, along with originating in regions with very few Afrikaans speaking people, contributed to English being the main language of the coloured people in the region.

The accent of Anglophone coloured people is influenced by their multiracial background, being descended from Europeans (British, German, and Afrikaners), Blacks (Zulu and Xhosa), Indians (both Dravidian and Indo-Aryan) as well as other mixed people like St. Helenians, Mauritian Creoles and some Griquas. This has influenced the accent to be one of the most distinctive in Southern Africa.

=== Cape Flats English ===
A particular variety or sub-spectrum of South African English is Cape Flats English, originally and best associated with inner-city Cape Coloured speakers.

== Lexicon ==
=== History of SAE dictionaries ===
In 1913, Charles Pettman created the first South African English dictionary, entitled Africanderisms. This work sought to identify Afrikaans terms that were emerging in the English language in South Africa. In 1924, the Oxford University Press published its first version of a South African English dictionary, The South African Pocket Oxford Dictionary. Subsequent editions of this dictionary have tried to take a "broad editorial approach" in including vocabulary terms native to South Africa, though the extent of this inclusion has been contested. Rhodes University (South Africa) and Oxford University (Great Britain) worked together to produce the 1978 Dictionary of South African English, which adopted a more conservative approach in its inclusion of terms. This dictionary did include, for the first time, what the dictionary writers deemed "the jargon of townships", or vocabulary terms found in Black journalism and literary circles. Dictionaries specialising in scientific jargon, such as the common names of South African plants, also emerged in the twentieth century. However, these works still often relied on Latin terminology and European pronunciation systems. As of 1992, Rajend Mesthrie had produced the only available dictionary of South African Indian English.

=== Vocabulary ===
Unique SAE terms include:

- robot (traffic light)
- tekkies (trainers, sneakers, or tennis shoes)

SAE includes lexical items borrowed from other South African languages. The following list provides a sample of some of these terms:

- braai (barbecue) from Afrikaans
- impimpi (police informant)
- indaba (conference; meeting) from Zulu
- kwela-kwela (taxi or police pick-up van)
- madumbies (a type of edible root) found in Natal
- mama (term of address for a senior woman)
- mbaqanga (type of music)
- morabaraba (board game)
- sgebengu (criminal) found in IsiXhosa and IsiZulu speaking areas
- skebereshe (a loose woman) found in Gauteng
- y'all (the contraction of "you all") for second person plural pronouns in ISAE
- aweh (a greeting or in agreement)
- skollie (an ill-mannered person or someone suspected of engaging in antisocial, possibly criminal, behaviour).

==== British lexical items ====
SAE also contains several lexical items that demonstrate the British influence on this variety:

- arse, bum (ass)
- chemist (drugstore)
- dinner-jacket (tuxedo)
- dustbin (garbage can)
- petrol (gasoline)
- silencer (muffler)
- flat (apartment)

=== Expressions ===
A range of SAE expressions have been borrowed from other South African languages, or are uniquely used in this variety of English. Some common expressions include:

- The borrowed Afrikaans interjection ag, meaning "oh!", as in, "Ag, go away man"! (Equivalent to German "ach"). SAE uses a number of discourse markers from Afrikaans in colloquial speech.
- The expression to come with, common especially among Afrikaans people, as in "are they coming with?" This is influenced by the Afrikaans phrase hulle kom saam, literally "they come together", with saam being misinterpreted as with. In Afrikaans, saamkom is a separable verb, similar to meekomen in Dutch and mitkommen in German, which is translated into English as "to come along". "Come with?" is also encountered in areas of the Upper Midwest of the United States, which had a large number of Scandinavian, Dutch and German immigrants, who, when speaking English, translated equivalent phrases directly from their own languages.
- The use of the "strong obligative modal" must as a synonym for the polite should/shall. "Must" has "much less social impact" in SAE than in other varieties.
- Now-now, as in "I'll do it now-now". Likely borrowed from the Afrikaans nou-nou, this expression describes a time later than that referenced in the phrase "I'll do it now".
- Crayfish, used instead of lobster, likely comes from the Afrikaans “kreef”.
- Kiff, as in "this ice cream is kiff." Used to express approval or joy from something, or to describe something that is in fashion.
- A large amount of slang comes from British origin, such as "naff" (boring, dull or plain), or "China" (mate, friend) from cockney rhyming slang.

== Demographics ==
The South African National Census of 2011 found a total of 4,892,623 speakers of English as a first language, making up 9.6% of the national population. The provinces with significant English-speaking populations were the Western Cape (20.2% of the provincial population), Gauteng (13.3%) and KwaZulu-Natal (13.2%).

English was found to be spoken across all of South Africa's ethnic groups. A breakdown of English speakers according to the conventional racial classifications used by Statistics South Africa is described in the following table:

Population group	First-language English speakers	% of population group	% of total English-speakers
Black African	1,167,913	2.9	23.9
Coloured	945,847	20.8	19.3
Indian or Asian	1,094,317	86.1	22.4
White	1,603,575	35.9	32.8
Other	80,971	29.5	1.7
Total	4,892,623	9.6	100.0

== Examples of South African accents ==
The examples of South African accents in the list below were obtained from George Mason University:

- Male from Nigel, Gauteng
- Male from Port Elizabeth
- Male from Cape Town
- Female from Cape Town

All four of the speakers in this list have English as their first language.

== See also ==
- List of English words of Afrikaans origin
- List of lexical differences in South African English
- List of South African slang words
- Zimbabwean English
- Australian English
- New Zealand English
- Commonwealth English
- Regional accents of English
- Dunglish
