= Anna-Mart van der Merwe =

South African actress (born 1963)

- Born: Anna-Mart van der Merwe; 9 August 1963 (age 63); Vredendal, South Africa
- Education: University of Cape Town
- Occupations: Filmmaker, Actress
- Years active: 1986–present
- Height: 1.65 m (5 ft 5 in)
- Spouse: George Ware

Anna-Mart van der Merwe (born 9 August 1963), is a South African filmmaker and actress. She is best known for the roles in the films Stuur groete aan Mannetjies Roux, Poppie Nongena, and Kanarie as well as television soapies Soul City, Binnelanders, and 7de Laan.

== Personal life ==
van der Merwe was born on 9 August 1963 in Vredendal, South Africa. She matriculated at Vredendal High School. Then she completed her BA degree in Languages from the University of Cape Town. Then she completed a diploma in Speech and Drama at the same university and nominated for ŉ Fleur de Cap award in the Most Promising Study category.

She is married to George Ware, a Zimbabwean businessman.

== Career ==
After graduation in 1987, she was offered a two-year contract with the then TRUK at the Windybrow Theater in Hillbrow, Johannesburg. During this period, she acted in many theatre productions: The Women of Troy, The Witches of Salem, Boo to the Moon and Sing You of Bombs. In 1989 her contract period ended and then became a freelance actress. In 1988, she made her television debut with the television serial Uitdraai produced by Annie Basson. After that success, she acted in many television serials in the preceding years such as; Sonkring 1 en 2, Torings, Konings, Onder Draai die Duiwel Rond, Soul City, Amalia, Feast of the Uninvited, Binnelanders, 7de Laan and Tydelik Terminaal gevolg.

In 1992, she made her debut film with Die Storie van Klara Viljee directed by Katinka Heyns. After that she appeared in several films, such as; The Long Run, Red Dust, Hanna Hoekom, Stuur Groete aan Mannetjies Roux, Dis Koue Kos Skat. In 1994, she acted in the telenovela Soul City, where she later won the Avanti Trophy for the Best Supporting Actress - Drama Series category at the NTVA Avanti Awards. In 2009, she joined with the cast of 7de Laan and played the role "Christelle Terreblanche". For this role, she won the SAFTA Golden Horn Best Supporting Actress - TV Soap category at the South African Film and Television Awards (SAFTA). In 2013, she starred in the film Stuur groete aan Mannetjies Roux and later won the Silwerskerm Festival Prize for Best Actress at the 2014 Silwerskerm Festival.

In 2018, she was nominated for the SAFTA Golden Horn for Best Supporting Actress in Feature Film category for the role "Arlene Louw" in the blockbuster film Kanarie directed by Christiaan Olwagen. In 2019, she acted in the film Poppie Nongena and played the role "Antoinette Swanepoel". At the Silwerskerm Festival, van der Merwe along with film crew won the Best Ensemble Cast Award. Then she won the SAFTA Golden Horn award for the Best Supporting Actress - Feature Film category at the SAFTA in 2020.

Apart from that she also performed in numerous theatre plays such as; The Seagull, Uit die Bloutev, Generaal Mannetjies Mentz, King Lear, Uncle Vanya/Oom Wanja, Twaalfde Nag, Begeerte, God of Carnage, Macbeth-Slapeloos, People are Living There, Skuldeisers, The Mother, Fotostaatmasjien and Liewer.

=== Notable stage dramas ===
- Fotostaatmasjien (2018)
- The Mother
- Cinderella
- God van Chaos
- Jericho
- Die Twaalfuurwals
- Kamer van Spieëls
- Imbumba Samesyn
- Begeerte
- Twaalfde Nag
- Die Buffel
- Uncle Vanya
- Pendoring
- Steeks
- Wyn
- Generaal Mannetjies Mentz
- King Lear
- Die Laaste Strooi
- Uit die Bloute
- Die Vleiroos
- Moby Dick
- Die Mirakel
- The Seagull
- Die Hekse van Salem
- Sing jy van Bomme
- Keep Moving Ma Jack
- Four Play
- Boo to the Moon
- Women of Troy

== Filmography ==
Year	Film	Role	Genre	Ref.
1988	Uitdraai	Cornelie	TV movie	
1990	Veldslag	Dolly	TV mini series	
1991	Die Sonkring	Maryna du Plessis	TV series	
1991	Taxi to Soweto	Miss Rautenbach	Film	
1992	Die Storie van Klara Viljee	Klara Viljee	Film	
1992	Konings	Rika Roodt	TV series	
1993	Die Sonkring II	Maryna MacDonald	TV series	
1994	Torings	Rika Groenewald	TV series	
1994	Paradys		TV series	
1995	The Syndicate	Marsha Delport	TV series	
1995	Viva!	Nikki	TV series	
1969	Vierspel	Lollie	TV series	
1996	Hagenheim: Streng Privaat	Veronica Williams	TV series	
1997	Onder Draai die Duiwel Rond	Brenda le Roux	TV series	
1998	Samaritaan	Rosa	TV series	
1999	Saints, Sinners and Settlers	Alie	Film	
2000	7de Laan	Christelle Terreblanche	TV series	
2000	Desert Diners		Film	
2001	The Long Run	Anna	Film	
2005	Amalia	Dr. Sanet Visser	TV series	
2006	Amalia 2	Dr. Sanet Visser	TV series	
2008	Feast of the Uninvited	Martie van Wyk	TV series	
2008	Skin	Anna Roux	Film	
2009	Binnelanders		TV series	
2010	Die Ongelooflike Avonture van Hanna Hoekom	Mana	Film	
2013	Die Ballade van Robbie de Wee	Erna Verwey	Film	
2013	Stuur groete aan Mannetjies Roux	Koba Basson	Film	
2016	Dis Koue Kos, Skat	Clara Brand	Film	
2018	Kanarie	Arlene Louw	Film	
2019	Poppie Nongena	Antoinette Swanepoel	Film	
2019	Tydelik Terminaal	Julie	TV mini series	
2021	Reyka	Elsa	TV series	

== Awards ==
- Silver Screen Nomination: Best Supporting Actress ( Poppie Nongena )
- SAFTA Award: Canary
- aArtes Award: Best Actress in Sonkring 2
- FNB Regional Award: Out of the Blue
- FNB Regional Award : The Last Straw
- Prestige Women's Award Report
- Vita Award: Best Supporting Actress for The Witches of Salem
- Avanti Award: Soul City
- SAFTA Award: 7de Laan
- Silver Screen Award: Send Greetings to Males Roux
- Fleur de Cap Award: Best Supporting Actress for Wandering
- SAFTA Golden Horn Award: Best Supporting Actress in 7de Laan
