= Laurika Rauch =

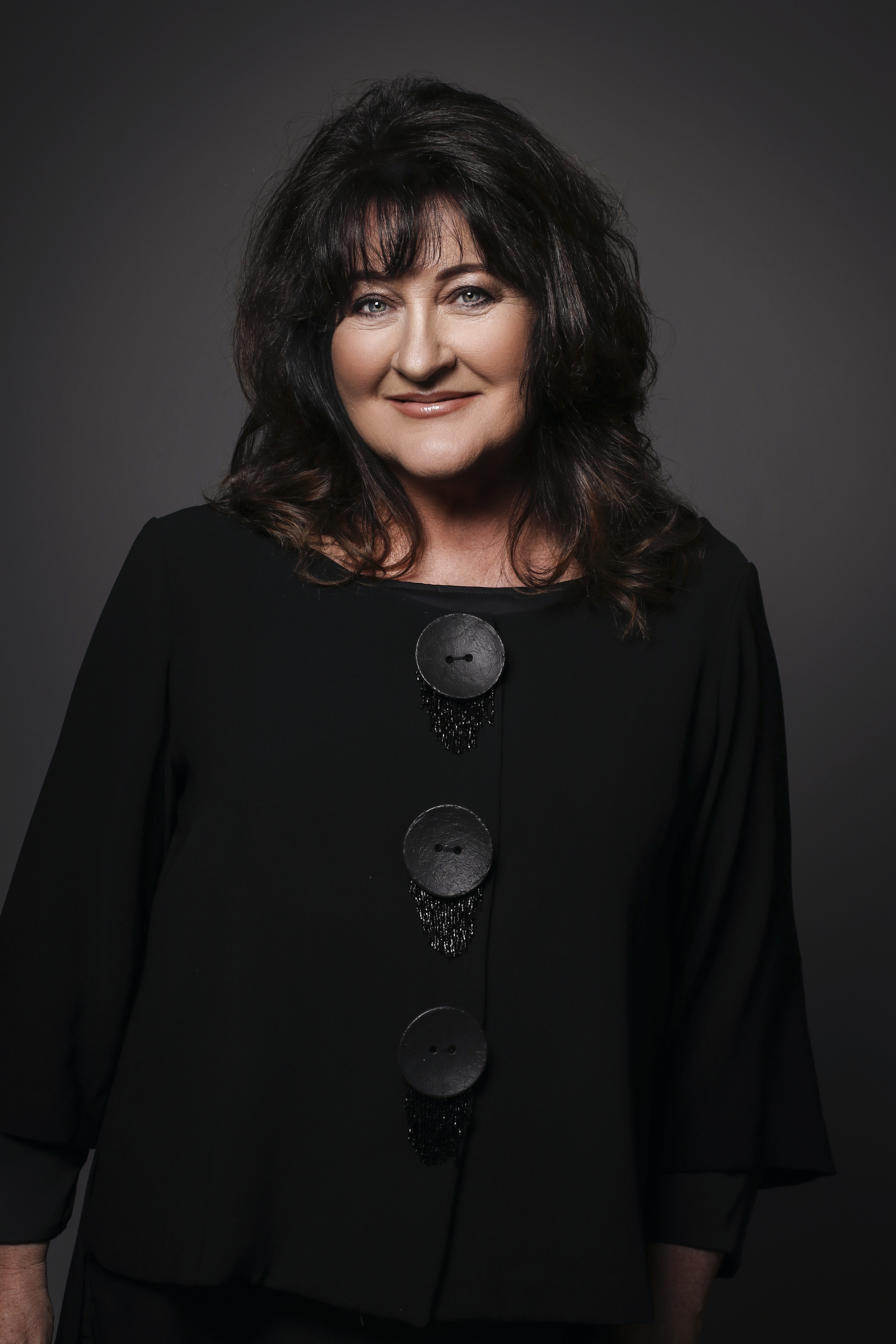

Background information
- Born: Laurika Cecile Rauch; 1 November 1950 (age 75); Cape Town
- Genre: Middle of the road •Popular
- Occupation: Singer
- Instrument: Singer
- Years active: 1979 – 2025
- Label: Laurika Rauch Productions
- Website: laurikarauch.com

Laurika Rauch, OIB (born 1 November 1950 in Cape Town) is a South African singer who performs in both Afrikaans and English. She had a hit single in 1979 with Kinders van die Wind (Children of the Wind), written by Koos du Plessis. The song featured prominently in the Afrikaans television series "Phoenix & Kie" in the late seventies.

== Early life ==
Laurika was born in Cape Town on 1 November as the youngest child of Fritz and Rina Rauch. Her father was the public relations manager at Old Mutual until his retirement and her mother was a trained social worker, the editor of Die Huisvrou magazine and was also very involved in charity work, especially amongst the elderly. She started playing the piano at the age of five, and sang alto in Oom Hannes Uys se Kindersangkring, a children’s choir from Pinelands, for 10 years.

Laurika matriculated at Jan van Riebeeck High School in Cape Town, studied drama at the University of Stellenbosch and obtained her degree in 1972. She moved to Gauteng in 1974 and became a household name in 1979 with the release of her first hit, Kinders van die wind. It was the first Afrikaans song in the late seventies to simultaneously reach the number one position on the Radio 5 and Springbok radio hit parades.

== Career ==
She was an actress with PACT PLAYWORK in 1975-1976 under the leadership of Robin Malan. In the early eighties she also attracted attention with her interpretation of Jacques Brel’s music with her performances in Taubie Kushlick's two Jacques Brel productions at the Chelsea Theatre in Hillbrow.

In August 1996, Laurika performed with the Transvaal Philharmonic Orchestra (renamed NAPOP, now disbanded) in the Opera of the State Theatre in a program that consisted entirely of her repertoire. Both performances were sold out. Laurika has performed in Belgium, The Netherlands, Germany, London, the Czech Republic, New Zealand, and Australia. In December 1993, she performed for an audience of 13,000 people in Utrecht, accompanied by the well-known Metropole Orchestra.

In March 1997 the Charles University in Prague invited her and her pianist (Fanie Fouché) to represent Afrikaans as the youngest member of the Dutch language group to an audience of academics from Europe and Eastern Europe. The performances formed part of the Department of Neerlandistiek’s 75th Jubilee festivities at the university.

Laurika is married to Christopher Torr, the composer and writer of many of her hits, such as Stuur Groete aan Mannetjies Roux, Op Blouberg se Strand, Hot Gates, Die Gang, Die mense op die Bus, My ou Tante Koba, Die Siener, Stille waters and many more. In 2011, Chris's first musical - Stuur groete aan Mannetjies Roux - was staged. It played to more than 50 sold-out performances in four main centres. The film titled Stuur groete aan Mannetjies Roux, which is based on the play, with Anna-Mart van der Merwe and Ian Roberts in lead roles, was released in 2013.

In September 2013, she toured Australia and New Zealand. Laurika and her team performed in Auckland, Brisbane, Melbourne, and Perth.

Laurika released her first album in 4 years, Wals, wals, Willemien in 2014, Die reis followed in October 2016 and Gunstelinge in October 2017. In 2018, she performed with Loki Rothman at the Festival voor het Afrikaans in Amsterdam. In 2019, she commemorated her 40 years in the music industry by releasing a limited edition (1000 copies) box set of 15 of her most loved albums, titled Laurika Rauch: 40 Jaar.

Chris and Laurika have two children - Simon and Nina, and five grandchildren.

== ‘Encore! Brel’ and ‘Met permissie gesê’ ==
After the success of ‘Kinders van die wind’ and her ‘Debuut’-album, the singer and songwriter Anton Goosen asked her in October 1979 to accompany him on a tour. At that time Goosen was also establishing a name for himself with his original Afrikaans music and his hit ‘Kruidjie-Roer-my-nie’. Before him it was often the case that German and other songs of foreign origin were translated and released in South Africa. Original local songwriters were few and far between.

Around this time the ‘grand dame’ of theatre, Taubie Kushlick, heard of Rauch. In 1980 she asked her for an audition as she was looking for somebody to interpret the music of the Belgian songwriter Jacques Brel in a new production with Ann Hamblin and Ferdie Uphof. Kushlick quickly decided that this "boeremeisie" (Afrikaner girl)– as she called Rauch – was the appropriate choice for her new production, ‘Encore! Brel’. It was a great success and played for six months in the Chelsea Theatre in Hillbrow. An ensuing production, ‘The Best of Brel’, followed in 1983.

In 1981 she was also in the cast of ‘Met permissie gesê’, written by Hennie Aucamp. The show was the first Afrikaans cabaret with Janice Honeyman as director and people such as Amanda Strydom, Rina Nienaber, Gerben Kamper and Bill Curry in the cast, it was a form of "civilised protest" against the government of the day.

== Christopher Torr develops as a songwriter ==
In 1984, English-speaking husband, Christopher Torr, wrote a song in English about the bank robber André Stander, who had obtained almost legendary notoriety in South Africa. The song was never recorded or performed.

When somebody gave Rauch a cassette recording of the music of the Udo Jürgens, she didn't listen to it at first, choosing to focus on original Afrikaans material, rather than translating foreign songs. Torr began listening to the German songs, and without knowing what the German meant, wrote Afrikaans words for one of the songs which was eventually recorded and released as one of Rauch's greatest hits –‘Op Blouberg se strand’. Torr still provides much of Rauch's most successful material.

== Laurika Rauch as a songwriter ==
Rauch has put quite a few poems to music and recorded them, such as Nalekokers and Niks hang so rooi soos wingerdblaar by Hexrivier by Boerneef, Ballade vir ‘n koningsdogter by ID du Plessis and Windliedjie and Toemaar die donker man by Ingrid Jonker.

== Career highlights and awards ==
Rauch received a ‘Sarie’ award in 1980 as most promising singer. She was the first recipient of a medal of honour awarded by the ‘South African Academy for Arts and Science’ for her contribution to light Afrikaans music in 1997. In 2006 ‘Huisgenoot Skouspel’ crowned her with an award for her lifelong achievement.

‘Van Berlyn tot Bapsfontein’, together with Jannie du Toit in 1988, was another highlight for her. Stephan Bouwer was the director of this singular production. She took part in Huisgenoot Skouspel in 2000 for the first time, with further performances in 2001, 2002, 2003, 2006, 2007, 2008 en 2009. She was also involved in the ‘Huisgenoot's Kaapse Jol’ in 2007, and ‘Skouspel Plus' in 2009 and 2010. There were various overseas performances, amongst them a concert tour to Belgium in 1985 (a documentary for television was also made during this tour), performances in the Netherlands in 1993 and 1994, three performances in London (2002–2004) at the Ukkasie festival, two performances in Prague (1997 and 1998) and a performance in Antwerp in 2006.

‘Samekoms/Kopano’ with Vusi Mahlasela in 1998/99 is another high point of her career. Rauch was producer and singer, and Deon Opperman the director.

In 2011 her husband, Christopher Torr, completed the musical theatre piece, Stuur groete aan Mannetjies Roux, and sold-out runs at the Atterbury Theatre in Pretoria, the Artscape in the Cape, Emperor's Palace in Johannesburg and the Sand du Plessis theatre in Bloemfontein, were completed at the end of July. Her most popular songs were used in the production, and Rauch also sang and acted in the show. The musical, with a cast of 12 actor/singers, surpassed all expectations – artistically and at the box office.

In 2016 she was awarded the Order of Ikhamanga for "her outstanding contribution in the field of music and raising awareness on political injustices through music."

== Discography ==
‘Debuut’ (1979), ‘ ’n Jaar in my lewe’ (1980), ‘Vir Jou’ (1981), ‘Jy is te dierbaar’ (1983) ‘Laurika op versoek’ (1985) and ‘Encore! Laurika’ (1988):

These vinyl albums provided some of Rauch's greatest hits. Anton Goosen still provided many of the compositions on Debuut, with songs such as ‘Neanderdalman’ and ‘Vergeet om my te vergeet/onthou om te onthou’. Kupido, who would later achieve fame as a country singer, provided ‘Jy is te dierbaar’ and ‘Lied van die natuur’ on the 1983 album ‘Jy is te dierbaar’. With ‘Encore!Laurika’ Chris Torr emerged on the scene as a songwriter with tracks such as ‘Miekie’ and ‘Die ballade van Jakob F de Beer’. It was actually ‘Op Blouberg se strand’ – his translation of the Udo Jürgens song – that was particularly popular with the public.

'Stuur groete aan Mannetjies Roux’ (1990), ‘Die gang’ (1992) and afterwards:

'Stuur groete aan Mannetjies Roux’ was her first Afrikaans album to reach platinum status, and it was the first female Afrikaans album ever to appear in South Africa as a CD. Chris Torr provided the title track about the legendary rugby player Mannetjies Roux. Die gang was the first album that Rauch released in the name of her own record company, ‘Laurika Rauch Productions’. The gripping title track of the ‘Hot Gates’ album of 1995 was also one of Torr's compositions. It remains one of Rauch's greatest hits. Rauch received a SAMA for this album. With The Brel Album (1997) she returned to her roots as a great interpreter of the music of Jacques Brel.

Although there have been other successful greatest hits compilations, her ‘19 Treffers van 21 jaar’ (1999) was a collection spanning more than 20 years of her career. This compilation has obtained double platinum status with sales of more than 120 000 and remains a good seller.

Gian Groen provided the title track of Vier Seisoene Kind (2002) and it remains one of her most popular songs. My ou tante Koba (2004) was nominated for a SAMA. On her album Tweeduisend-en-tien! (2010), she performs a duet with Kurt Darren (‘Slang in die gras’) and the Robbie Wessels song Skouspel 2010, about a baboon that creates chaos in a hotel room, provides comic relief with the aid of baboon sounds provided by the musician Leon Ecroignard. Her first full-length DVD of a performance, with Deon de Bruyn as director and Louis Brittz as musical director, appeared in 2006. The title is LAURIKA RAUCH: Grootste treffers LIVE.

Including compilations of her greatest hits, Rauch has released 22 albums.

- Debuut (1979) – (Gold status) Arranged and directed by Dan Hill
- 'n Jaar in my lewe (1980) – Arranged and directed by Dan Hill
- Vir jou (1981) – Arranged and directed by Dan Hill
- Jy is te dierbaar (1983) – (Gold status) Arranged and directed by Zane Cronjé
- Laurika op versoek (1985) – compilation
- Encore! Laurika (1988) – (Gold status) Arranged and directed by Peter McLea
- Stuur Groete aan Mannetjies Roux (1990) – (Platinum status) Arranged and directed by Peter McLea
- Grootste Treffers Vol. 1 (1991) – (Gold status) Compilation
- Die gang (1992) – Arranged and directed by Peter McLea
- Hot gates (1995) – (Gold status) Arranged and directed by Peter McLea
- Grootste treffers Vol.2 (1996) – Compilation
- The Brel album (1997) – Arranged and directed by Peter McLea
- 19 Treffers van 21 Jaar (1999) – (Triple Platinum status) Compilation of hits until 1999
- Die Mense op die bus (1999) – (Gold status) Arranged and directed by Marshall Harmse. The title track was the theme song of the popular Afrikaans TV series - Iemand om lief te hê
- Hei Mevrou Brown (dit gaan goed) (2000) – Arranged and directed by Jahn Beukes
- Vier seisoene kind (2002) – Arranged and directed by Peter McLea
- My ou tante Koba (2004) – Leon Ecroignard, Wouter van de Venter and Clinton Waring (her band members between 1998 and 2004) were the musical directors. Peter McLea managed the production and did the supporting arrangements.
- Die nuwe trefferalbum (2004) – Compilation
- Chris se trefferliedjies (2005) – Compilation of all Christopher Torr’s songs between 1988 en 2006
- 'n Lekker verlang liedjie (2007) – Arranged and directed by Louis Brittz
- Tweeduisend-en-tien! (2010) – The album consisted of one CD with brand new songs plus a bonus CD with 11 previous songs. Arranged and directed by Peter McLea
- Laurika Rauch sing die liedjies uit Stuur groete aan Mannetjies Roux (2011) - This compilation album also includes three new songs of Christopher Torr. Lulu van der Walt was the arranger and musical director of the three new tracks.
- Wals, wals Willemien (2014) - This album was Laurika’s first featuring mainly original songs since Tweeduisend-en-tien!. The album was well-received and As ek eendag oud is and Murg en Been were placed on high rotation on all the important radio stations. Wals, wals Willemien reached gold status within three months of its release. Jaconell Mouton was main arranger and musical director, together with Juan (Floors) Oosthuizen.
- Die reis (2016) - Juan (Floors) Oosthuizen – was die main arranger and Devereaux van der Hoven-Oosthuizen, Loki Rothman and Bittereinder also contributed as arrangers. Arnold Coleske was responsible for the musical direction, production and vocal production.
- Gunstelinge (2017) - A compilation of some of Laurika’s favourite songs that she recorded between 2000 and 2017. A new version of Kyk hoe glinster die maan can also be heard on this compilation.
- Laurika Rauch – 40 Jaar (Limited edition box set to commemorate her 40 years in the industry) (April 2019)

== DVDs ==
- Kom laat ons sing - 'n musikale reis van Laurika Rauch (2002) - A documentary on the development of Afrikaans songs from the 1930s until 2002. Laurika is the narrator and presenter and Johan Badenhorst the director. 6 Episodes.
- Laurika Rauch: Grootste Treffers LIVE (Gold Status) (2006) - This is a live recording of Laurika performing her best-known songs accompanied by a band. Louis Brittz is the musical arranger and Deon de Bruyn is the video director.
- Stuur groete aan Mannetjies Roux (2013) - The film, released in December 2013. Laurika plays a character role and is responsible for all the vocals on the sound track.
- Hart en See (2015) - With Elvis Blue - released in 2015. Huisgenoot is the media partner. Laurika an Elvis receive a Tempo-award in 2016 for best seller and DVD of the year and a Ghoema award in the same year for best DVD production for Hart en See.

== Television performances ==
- Fyn net van die Woord
- Musiek en Liriek
- In revue met ... Laurika Rauch
- Debuut
- Spies en Plessis
- Potpourri
- Teletreffers
- Klub 88
- Laurika in België
- Lekker Ligte Liedjies
- Kom kuier saam met Laurika Rauch
- Middagvertoning
- Platepraatjies
- Hot Gates: 'n Dokumentêr
- April 1980 (Film)
- Noot vir Noot
- Draadloos
- Geraas
- Kom Laat Ons Sing - 'n dokumentêr
- Huisgenoot Skouspel (2000 - 2003; 2006 - 2009; 2012 - 2014)
- Kyknet Fiëstas 2013
- Kwêla 2014
- Jam interview (2014)
- Die Republiek van Zoid Afrika (2015)
- Afrikaans is Groot (2015 - 2017)
- For kykNET: Laurika takes part in a symposium about the entertainment industry, and the business aspect in particular (2016)
- Adjudicates 2 episodes for Varsity Sing for kykNET (2016)
- A Bravo interview (2016)
- A Kliphard interview (2017)
- A Bravo interview (2017)
- Afrikaans is Groot 2015/2016/2017/2019
- The Voice – Guest performance during 2019 the final show

== Directing ==
Laurika directs and compiles most of her solo performances, and has also been involved in the productions of other singers such as:

1992	Neem kennis (In the Rendezvous of the State Theatre) with Helena Hettema, Danie Niehaus en Illse Roos.
1992	Fm Blues (In the Momentum of the State Theatre) with Coenie de Villiers.
1998	Padlangs, with Karla du Plessis, Fanie Fouché and Dawie Nolte.
1998/1999	Drie van die Bestes/Three of the Best – Millennium (Director, together with Gerrie Jamneck)(Mathys Roets, Danie Niehaus, Kevin Leo)
1998	Vocal director for the Karla du Plessis debut album, Woordeloos
1999	Neem Kennis 2 (Cindy Sampson, Philip Moolman, Wouter van de Venter) (This was a work commissioned by the Klein Karoo Nasionale Kunstefees 1999, based on the Neem Kennis-concept of 1992
2001	Vocal director for Janita Claassen's Wilde Aalwyn album released in August 2001.
2006	Blou kafee - for Illse Roos's performance at the KKNK
2008	Compiled and directed the production of Laurika en Nuwe Vriende at the Centurion Theatre. Artists who appeared with Laurika were Ansujé, La Diva, ‘n Man soos Jan, Jaco and Andriëtte.

== Performances ==
1977	Fangs Directed by Ken Leach; PACT.
1978	The Bedsitting Room Directed by Nigel Vermaas: Market Theatre
1980	Encore! Brel For Taubie Kushlick, at the Chelsea Theatre
1980	Performed with Donald Swann (of Flanders and Swann-fame); the Soweto Teacher's Choir; Mara Louw and Will Bernard in an evening with Donald Swann, his own music and his musical compositions of Van Wyk Louw poems.
1981	Met Permissie Gesê Directed by Janice Honeymon; Market Theatre
1984	Took part in a programme about Koos du Plessis's music with Jana Cilliers, Lucas Maree and Nic Taylor
1983/84	The Best of Brel
1987 en 1995	Performance at Grahamstown Festival
1988	Van Berlyn tot Bapsfontein, with Jannie du Toit Directed by Stephan Bouwer
1990	Op die Hartstog Boulevard, with Jannie du Toit Directed by Stephan Bouwer
1990	Laurika op nagskof, with Phillip Moolman Directed by Ilse van Hemert
1990	Hoagy, with Lisa Michaelson and David Dennis for Pieter Toerien. Directed by Jimmy Bell.
1993	Performed with the Metropole Orchestra in Utrecht at a Christmas Concert in front of an audience of 13 000
1994	Performed in Bussum, Netherlands during a South African week.
1994	Laurika sings Brel
1996	Laurika sings with the TFO
1996	She participates in the Human Rights Concert. Directed by Victor Masondo
1996	Elize en Laurika maak nuus, with Elize Cawood. Directed by Wilson Dunster
1997	Performs with Fanie Fouché as accompanist in Prague at the Department of Neerlandistiek’s 75th Jubilee festival.
1998/99	Samekoms/Kompano, with Vusi Mahlasela. Directed by Deon Opperman
2000-2002	Laurika en Orkes. Directed by Deon Opperman
2001-03; 2006–09; 2012-13	Huisgenoot Skouspel, at the Super Bowl in Sun City.
2002	Ons Kruis Paaie, with Stef Bos, David Kramer, Taliep Pietersen, Denise Jannah, Frank Boeijen, Koos Kombuis and Ray Phiri. Directed by Stef Bos
2002	Laurika in die Staatsteater
2002 – 2004	3 x Ukkasie shows in London: Stevenage, Wembley stadium and The Royal Albert Hall.
2002	Sarie Inspirasiekonserte with Karen Zoid, Lize Beekman, Amanda Strydom en Valiant Swart.
2002	Laurika en die manne at the Volksbladfees.
2003	Woordfees with Laurinda Hofmeyr, Valiant Swart, Albert Frost, Schalk Joubert and Barry van Zyl.
2003 - 2004	Produces three music videos: Kom laat ons sing; Vier seisoene kind; My ou tante Koba Directed by Deon de Bruyn
2003	Balkon with Leon Ecroignard, Wouter van de Venter, Jahn Beukes and Clinton Waring at the KKNK.
2003	Solo performance at the Artscape Theatre in Cape Town.
2003	Performances at in Sangita and White River Barnyards.
2003	WAM-fees with Cutt Glas, Sibongile Khumalo, Jennifer Jones, Isadora Verwey.
2004	Droomstoel Directed by Deon Opperman
2004	Naderby at the Aardklopfees. Directed by Johan Badenhorst.
2005	Plakboek, with Amanda Strydom.
2005	Performance at the Grey College Choir Festival
2006	Performs at Roetesfestival in Antwerpen.
2006	Performance with the Ekurhuleni Children’s Choir
2005/6	Produces her full length DVD: Grootste Treffers LIVE!
2007	Performance at the KKNK and sings Weeping with the die Bala-brothers.
2007	Performance at Aardpops, by Aardklop Kunstefees under the direction of Graham Scott and Janine Neethling.
2007	Solo performance with Clinton Waring in die KWV Cathedral Cellar.
2008	Performance at Carnival City Pops
2008	Performance Deuriemikke Karnaval at Loftus Stadium.
2009	Kurt Darren en Laurika Rauch saam, for the Volksbladfees.
2009	Performs with the UPSO in die Aula.
2009	Performs at Huisgenoot Skouspel Plus at the Grand West Casino.
2009	L2 with Lize Beekman
2010	Sings at the occasion of the opening of Parliament in Cape Town. The evening – at the new Cape Town Stadium was a highlight of her career for Laurika.
2010	Sings in Afri-Frans with Anna Davel, Myra Maud, Mathys Roets and Anna-Mart van der Merwe.
2010	Brel in Brooklyn with Jannie du Toit. Directed by Esther Nasser.
2011	Sings Stuur groete aan Mannetjies Roux at Loftus in front of an audience of 60 000 people.
2011	Stuur groete aan Mannetjies Roux, a musical that toured from Pretoria to Cape Town. Directed by Paul Eilers and Clinton Zerf as the musical director.
2012	Laurika en Vriende, with Jak de Priester en Brandon October.
2013	Dorothy 60 Jaar at the KKNK, a musical production, with Karen Zoid, Dorothy Masuka and Zolani Mahola from Freshleyground with Carien Loubser as director.
2013	Performs in Brisbane, Auckland, Melbourne and Perth
2014	Performs at the Paul Clover Amphi Theatre
2014	Produce two music videos with Clinton Lubbe as director: As ek eendag oud is; Murg en Been.
2014	Performs at Starlight Classics
2014	Performs at Klein Karoo Pops
2014	Performs at the Woordfees: Liedjies vir alle tye
2014	Performs at RSG/LEFRA Oppiwater Kunstefees
2014	Hart en See with Elvis Blue at KKNK and Vryfees
2014	Guest on Republiek van Zoid Afrika.
2014	Performs at Innibos festival with Liedjies vir alle tye.
2014	Laurika sings with other artists for Hennie Smit, veteran comedian and actor after a bout of life threatening illness. Arina de Witt is the organizer.
2015	Hart en See performance at Die Woordfees and Innibosfees
2015	Performs at Legends-show at Innibos Festival.
2015	Tallard and the Ladderbird at the Sax Arena in Centurion.
2015	Nie as ek sing nie, at Aardklop Festival.
2015	Performs with the Bloemfontein Children's Choir.
2015	Performs at Afrikaans is Groot.
2015	Bravo-performance in Mossel Bay with Clinton Waring.
2016	Nie as ek sing nie, at the Taalmonument in Paarl.
2016	Manna vir die Boere - concert
2016	Performs at Woordfees Pops
2016	Nie as ek sing nie at KKNK
2016	Hart en See at the Suid-Ooster Festival in the Artscape Theatre.
2016	Nie as ek sing nie, at the Parkview Barnyard Theatre.
2016	Performs at Afrikaans is Groot
2017	Performs with Loki Rothman at Jason’s Hill Wine Estate.
2017	Blou with Loki Rothman at the Woordfees, Atterbury Theatre, Free State Festival and Aardklop Festival.
2017	Met liefde at the Grandwest Arena
2017	Performs at Liefde by die Dam
2017	Performs at Stars for Charity at Emperors Palace
2017	Performs at Afrikaans is Groot
2018	Blou with Loki Rothman, at Oude Libertas Amiphi Theatre.
2018	Digby my hart with Anton Esterhuyse at the Woordfees.
2018	Blou with Loki Rothman at KKNK
2018	Performs at the Freedom day Concert at the Suidoosterfees.
2018	Laurika in konsert in Atterbury Theatre, Pretoria.
2018	Blou, with Loki Rothman at Innibos Festival.
2018	Performs with Loki Rothman at Spar Kirkwood Wildsfees.
2018	Festival Voor het Afrikaans, Amsterdam, Netherlands.
2019	Several Optog! performances across South Africa.

== Personal life ==
She married Christopher Torr in 1984, after divorcing her first husband, Awie de Swardt. At the time, Christopher was a lecturer in economics and later became a professor. She has two children: Simon, from her marriage to Awie de Swardt, and Nina. She also has five grandchildren.

== Awards ==
- Sarie-award for the most promising singer (1980)
- Dalro-nomination for the best performance in a musical for Taubie Kushlick’s Encore! Brel (1980)
- Gallo-award for her performance in the musical Van Berlyn tot Bapsfontein (1988)
- Octave-award for her album Stuur groete aan Mannetjies Roux (1990)
- FAK-award for her sustained and exceptional promotion of Afrikaans songs (1995)
- FNB/SAMA-award for Hot Gates (1996)
- The first award of its kind by the South African Academy for Arts and Science for her contribution to light Afrikaans music. (1997)
- Honorary-award from her high school, Jan van Riebeeck, in Cape Town (1997)
- Standard Bank/SAMA nomination in the category BEST ADULT CONTEMPORARY ALBUM: Afrikaans, for Hei mevrou Brown (dit gaan goed). (1999)
- GERAAS-award, sponsored by SABC 2 en PUKK, for her life-long contribution to South African music (2001)
- Two Vonk-Oscars for: Life-long contribution to Afrikaans music and Album of the year – Die nuwe Trefferalbum (2004)
- SAMA-nomination for best adult contemporary album for My ou Tante Koba (2004)
- GERAAS-award for the best compilation album - Die nuwe Trefferalbum (2005)
- Laurika is chosen as one of five Afrikaans icons (chosen by independent market research) as part of the ATKV’s media campaign for AFRIKAANS KOOK. (2005)
- KANNA-nomination for PLAKBOEK (together with Amanda Strydom) (2005)
- RAPPORT en CITY PRESS prestige-award (2005)
- HUISGENOOT Life-long achievement award (2006)
- An award from Dames Aktueel for her Contribution to Afrikaans music. (2009)
- An award from the Gariep Arts festival, Kimberley, for her Outstanding contribution to the Arts in South Africa (2009).
- An award from the organisation Want ons kan!/’Cause we can! For Years of Inspiration. (2012)
- An award from Cultivaria for Exceptional Hits in Afrikaans (2012)
- KANNA-award for the production Dorothy 60 jaar at the KKNK– Laurika performs with the legendary Dorothy Masuka, Karen Zoid and Zolani Mahola Directed by Carien Loubser. Musical director: Melissa van der Spuy.
- Woordtrofee from the US Woordfees for Best contemporary Musical Production (Beste kontemporêre musiekproduksie) at the festival for Liedjies vir alle tye. She is accompanied by Llewellyn George (piano and musical director), Kenny Williams. (2014)
- Laurika is the VLU’s (Vroue landbou Unie) artist of the year. (2014)
- KANNA-nomination for ‘Hart en See’ at the KKNK. This is a duet production with Elvis Blue. Director: Deon Opperman and musical director: Janine Neethling. (2014)
- The Clover-award for the Most popular production at Aardklop, for Nie as ek sing nie with Juan (Floors) Oosthuizen (guitar), Devereaux van der Hoven-Oosthuizen (piano and musical direction) and Vernette Rautenbach Wessels (backing vocals).(2015)
- Versnit award in Recognition of her exceptional contribution to Afrikaans Culture. (Erkenning vir ‘n besondere bydrae tot die Afrikaanse Kultuurskat) (2015)
- Ghoema- award for Best female contemporary album for Wals, wals Willemien. (2015)
- Kyknet Fiësta-nomination for Best achievement in a musical production as well as a nomination for Best music-driven production both for Nie as ek sing nie. (2016)
- A Gold status award from Coleske Artists for Sales in excess of 20,000 units for Wals, wals Willemien (2016)
- Ghoema-award together with Elvis Blue, for Best DVD-production for Hart en See. (2016)
- Tempo-award together with Elvis Blue, for Hart en See (DVD) as Top seller and DVD of the year. (2016)
- FAK Prestige-award for a Lifetime’s contribution to the advancement of Afrikaans music. (2016)
- An award of the order of Ikhamanga (bronze) from the Presidency.(2016)
- A Ghoema-award for Ringtone of the year for ‘Blou’ with Loki Rothman. (2017)
- Ghoema-award for Best female contemporary album of the year for ‘Die reis’.(2017)
- Bokkie award for Lifetime achievement from Bokradio. (2017)
- A Lifetime achievement award from Innibosfees – awarded jointly to her and her husband and collaborator/songwriter, Chris Torr (2019)
- Laurika is inducted in the South African Hall of Fame for her contribution to the performing arts.(2019)

== See also ==
- List of Afrikaans singers
- List of South African musicians
- Music of South Africa
