= 1982 in Spanish television =

This is a list of Spanish television related events in 1982.

== Events ==
- 7 February: On air episode ‘’Algo se muere en el alma’’ in the series Verano Azul, a significant moment in Spanish television, with the death of the character of Chanquete.
- 16 April: 180 News Department workers in TVE (among them Clara Isabel Francia, Luis Mariñas, Rosa María Mateo o Baltasar Magro) condemn political pressures on their work.
- 7 June: Official inauguration of Torrespaña.
- 13 June: Televisión Española airs live and worldwide the 1982 FIFA World Cup, taking place in Madrid.
- 23 July: Eugenio Nasarre is appointed Director General of RTVE.
- 17 August: TVE airs last episode of the third season of Dallas; the character of J. R. Ewing (Larry Hagman) is shot.
- 20 August: Mayra Gómez Kemp debuts as hostess of Quiz show Un, dos, tres... responda otra vez.
- 6 December: José María Calviño is appointed Director General of RTVE.

== Debuts ==
Title	Channel	Debut	Performers/Host	Genre
3, 2, 1... contacto	La 1	1982-02-15	Sonia Martínez	Youth
A pie, en bici o en moto	La 1	1982-09-15	Victoria Abril	Youth
Así como suena	La 1	1982-10-10	Mari Cruz Soriano	Variety show
Biblioteca Nacional	La 1	1982-11-19	Fernando Sánchez Dragó	Cultural/Science
Buenas noches	La 1	1982-10-21	Mercedes Milá	Talk show
Con H de Comedia	La 2	1982-05-23		Movies
Con solera	La 1	1982-11-19	Luis Tomás Melgar	News
Concierto 2	La 2	1982-04-02		Music
Cultural 82	La 1	1982-06-06		Cultural/Science
Dabadabada	La 1	1982-01-21	Mayra Gómez Kemp	Children
Dogtanian and the Three Muskehounds	La 1	1982-10-09		Cartoon
De cuatro a uno	La 1	1982-04-15	Jaime Campmany	Talk show
De película	La 1	1982-03-19	Isabel Mestres	Movies
Diálogos de un matrimonio	La 2	1982-01-11	Jesús Puente	Drama series
Al filo de lo imposible	La 1	1982-01-17		Documentary
Don Baldomero y su gente	La 2	1982-04-12	Luis Escobar	Drama series
El arte de vivir	La 1	1982-03-25	Victoria Prego	Cultural/Science
El compromiso de la libertad	La 2	1982-01-05	Federico Ysart	Cultural/Science
El juego de los errores	La 1	1982-10-24	Joaquín Calvo Sotelo	Quiz show
El loco mundo de los payasos	La 1	1982-01-26	Los Payasos de la Tele	Children
El tren	La 1	1982-11-14	Mari Carmen	Variety show
Encuentros en libertad	La 1	1982-12-15	Sibely Valle	Cultural/Science
Espacio XX	La 1	1982-01-22	Carmen Tomás	Cultural/Science
España, sin ir más lejos	La 1	1982-01-21		Documentary
Europa en juego	La 2	1982-10-14		Sport
Evocación	La 2	1981-10-31	Mary Cruz Fernández	Variety show
Fórmula TV	La 2	1982-11-02	José María Casanovas	Sport
Hoy por hoy	La 2	1982-01-20	Pastora Vega	Variety show
Juanita, la Larga	La 1	1982-04-20	Violeta Cela	Drama series
La máscara negra	La 1	1982-03-19	Sancho Gracia	Drama series
La otra cara del deporte	La 1	1982-10-08	Tacho de la Calle	Sport
La puerta del misterio	La 2	1982-01-17	Fernando Jiménez del Oso	Mystery
Los gozos y las sombras	La 1	1982-03-25	Eusebio Poncela	Drama series
Mirar un cuadro	La 1	1982-01-31		Cultural/Science
Mundial Informartivo	La 1	1982-06-15		Sport
Música clásica	La 2	1982-06-13	Enrique García Asensio	Music
Música y músicos	La 2	1982-10-27		Music
Nosotros	La 1	1982-01-22	Francisco García Novell	Sport
Palabras de vida	La 1	1982-10-21		Religion
Pista libre	La 1	1982-01-16	Sandra Sutherland	Youth
Plaza mayor	La 1	1982-02-14	Maruja Callaved	News
Por arte de magia	La 1	1982-05-01	Juan Tamariz	Magic
Producción Española	La 2	1982-02-27	Romualdo Molina	Movies
Próximamente	La 1	1982-02-07	Marisa Medina	Variety show
Pueblo de Dios	La 1	1982-09-25	Carmen Lázaro	Religion
Que vienen los cómicos	La 2	1982-04-13	Els Comediants	Comedy
Ramón y Cajal	La 1	1982-01-26	Adolfo Marsillach	Drama series
Rasgos	La 1	1982-03-14	Mónica Randall	Talk show
Redacción abierta	La 2	1982-01-10	Ricardo Díaz Manresa	News
Resumen jornada	La 1	1982-06-16		Sport
Secuencias del mundo	La 1	1982-02-05	Francisco Rioboo	News
Sedes del mundial	La 1	1982-01-15		Sport
Testimonio	La 2	1982-11-05		Religion
Usted, por ejemplo	La 1	1982-11-12	Manuel Torreiglesias	Variety show
Verdad o mentira	La 1	1982-04-10	Alberto Oliveras	Quiz show
Visto y no visto	La 1	1982-10-30	Alfredo Amestoy	Variety show

== Television programs ==
=== La 1 ===
- Telediario (1957– )
- Revista de toros (1971–1983)
- Un, dos, tres... responda otra vez (1972–2004)
- Estudio estadio (1972–2005)
- Informe Semanal (1973– )
- El gran circo de TVE (1973–1983)
- Gente joven (1976–1987)
- 300 millones (1977–1983)
- Parlamento (1978–2014)
- Aplauso (1978–1983)
- Vivir cada día (1978–1988)
- Un Mundo para ellos (1979–1983)
- Más vale prevenir (1979–1987)
- Bla, bla, bla (1981–1983)
- La Cometa blanca (1981–1983)
- El Libro gordo de Petete (1981–1983)
- Sabadabada (1981–1983)
- Su turno (1981–1983)
- Consumo (1981–1987)
- ¿Un Mundo feliz? (1981–1987)

=== La 2 ===
- Estudio abierto (1970–1985)
- La Clave (1976–1983)
- Musical express (1980–1983)
- Alcores (1981–1983)
- El Carro de la farsa (1981–1983)
- La víspera de nuestro tiempo (1981–1984)

== Ending this year ==
=== La 1 ===
- Hablamos (1977–1982)
- De cerca (1980–1982)
- Informativo juvenil (1980–1982)
- Blanco y negro (1981–1982)
- De ahora en adelante (1981–1982)
- En este país (1981–1982)
- Esta noche (1981–1982)
- Gol... y al Mundial (1981–1982)
- Objetivo (1981–1982)
- Otras cosas (1981–1982)
- Por tierras lejanas (1981–1982)
- Vamos a ver (1981–1982)
- Voces sin voz (1981–1982)

=== La 2 ===
- Retrato en vivo (1979–1982)
- Al cierre (1981–1982)
- Mis terrores favoritos (1981–1982)

== Foreign series debuts in Spain ==
English title	Spanish title	Original title	Channel	Country	Performers
79 Park Avenue	79 Park Avenue		La 1	USA	Lesley Ann Warren, Marc Singer
–	Los Hechos de los Apóstoles	Atti degli apostoli	La 2	ITA	Edoardo Torricella
Baggy Pants and the Nitwits	Don Calzones y los Chalados		La 1	USA	
Barriers	Barreras		La 1	UK	Benedict Taylor
Beulah Land	La plantación Beulah		La 1	USA	Lesley Ann Warren
Big Hawaii	El Gran Hawai		La 2	USA	John Dehner
Camp Wilderness	Acampada		La 1	USA	
Cosmos: A Personal Voyage	Cosmos		La 1	USA	Carl Sagan
David Copperfield	David Cooperfield		La 1	UK	David Yelland
Dinky Dog	El perro Dinky		La 2	USA	
Dynasty	Dinastía		La 1	USA	John Forsythe, Linda Evans, Joan Collins
Hart to Hart	Hart y Hart		La 1	USA	Robert Wagner, Stefanie Powers
How the West Was Won	La conquista del Oeste		La 1	USA	James Arness
In Desert and Wilderness	Aventuras de 2 niños en África	W pustyni i w puszczy	La 2	POL	Monika Rosca
Into the Labyrinth	Dentro del laberinto		La 2	UK	Pamela Salem
Logan's Run	La fuga de Logan		La 1	USA	Gregory Harrison, Heather Menzies
–	Malu, mujer	Malu Mulher	La 1	BRA	Regina Duarte
Murder in Texas	Asesinato en Texas		La 1	USA	Farrah Fawcett
Nanny	Nanny		La 1	UK	Wendy Craig
–	Orlando Furioso	Orlando Furioso	La 2	ITA	Massimo Foschi
Out	¿Quién delató a Frank Ross?		La 1	USA	Tom Bell
Rising Damp	Esto se hunde		La 2	UK	Leonard Rossiter
Secret Valley	Valle secreto		La 2	AUS	Beth Buchanan
Shoulder to Shoulder	Hombro con hombro		La 1	UK	Siân Phillips
Skag	Skag		La 1	USA	Karl Malden
The Flame Trees of Thika	Los árboles de Thika		La 1	UK	Hayley Mills
The Misadventures of Sheriff Lobo	Las desventuras del Sheriff Lobo		La 1	USA	Claude Akins
The Timeless Land	Tierra sin fronteras		La 1	CAN	Nicola Pagett
To Serve Them All My Days	Una vida a su servicio		La 1	UK	John Duttine
Ulysses 31	Ulises 31	Uchū Densetsu Yurishīzu Sātīwan	La 1	JAP	

== Births ==
- 22 January – Lorena García Díez, journalist & hostess
- 7 February – Esther Vaquero, journalist.
- 14 February – Isabel Jiménez, journalist.
- 25 March – David Bustamante, singer.
- 6 April – Miguel Ángel Silvestre, actor.
- 4 May – Isabel Aboy, actress.
- 9 June – Norma Ruiz, actress.
- 20 June – Antonio Castelo, comedian.
- 28 June – Anna Allen, actress.
- 20 July – Laila Jiménez, journalist.
- 9 August – Anna Simon, hostess.
- 29 September – Virginia Maestro, singer.
- 19 October – Ana Arias, actress.
- 29 October – Mariona Tena, actress.
- 11 December – Natalia, hostess & singer
- 23 December – Beatriz Luengo, actress & singer.
- 25 December – Dani Martínez – host.

== Deaths ==
- 16 February – Nélida Quiroga, actress.
- 15 July – Manuel Lozano Sevilla, crítico taurino.
- 14 October – Víctor Ruiz Iriarte, guionista.

== See also ==
- 1982 in Spain
- List of Spanish films of 1982
