= In Desert and Wilderness (disambiguation) =

In Desert and Wilderness is a 1912 novel by Henryk Sienkiewicz. It may also refer to:

- In Desert and Wilderness (1973 film)
- In Desert and Wilderness (2001 film)
- In Desert and Wilderness (1974 TV series)
- In Desert and Wilderness (2001 TV series)
