= Howard Rubie =

Australian director

- Born: Howard William Rubie; 27 August 1938; Sydney, New South Wales, Australia
- Died: 18 July 2011 (aged 72); Sydney, New South Wales, Australia
- Occupation: Director
- Awards: Emmy Award

Howard William Rubie (27 August 1938 – 18 July 2011) was an Australian director.

== Biography ==
Rubie was born in Sydney, he worked extensively in film and television, and was awarded for his services an Emmy and was nominated for an AFI Award (now known as the AACTA Award). and started his career in cinematography and was inducted in 2010 to the Australian Cinematographers Society Hall of Fame.

== Select Credits ==
- The World of the Seekers (1968) (documentary)
- Woobinda, Animal Doctor (1969) (TV series) - various episodes
- The Rovers (1969) (TV series) - various episodes
- Barrier Reef (1971) (TV series) - various episodes
- Wake in Fright (1971) (assistant director)
- Spyforce (1971–72) (TV series - various episodes)
- Boney (1972) (TV series) - various episodes
- Silent Number (1974) (TV series) - various episodes
- Human Target (1974) (TV)
- Shannon's Mob (1975) (TV series) - various episodes
- The Lost Islands (1976) (TV series) - various episodes
- The Haunting of Hewie Dowker (1976) (TV)
- Chopper Squad (1978) (TV series) - various episodes
- The Scalp Merchant (1978) (TV)
- Secret Valley (1980-82) (TV series) - various episodes (also co creator)
- Island Trader (1982) (TV)
- Silent Reach (1983) (TV)
- Chase Through the Night (1983) (TV)
- The Settlement (1984)
- Runaway Island (1984) (TV series) - various episodes
- Stock Squad (1985) (TV)
- Special Squad (1985-86) (TV series) - various episodes
- Butterfly Island (1985-86) (TV series) - various episodes
- Mission Top Secret (1992-95) (TV) - various episodes
- The Phantom Horseman (1990) (TV)
- Search for Treasure Island (1998-2000) (TV series) - various episodes
- Escape of the Artful Dodger (2001) (TV series) - various episodes
