= Snobs (TV series) =

- Genre: Children's series; Drama
- Created by: Nick Wilson; Noel Price
- Directed by: Ralph Strasser; Marcus Cole; Andrew Lewis
- Starring: Indiana Evans; Ross Perrelli; Ella Roberts; Mathew Waters; Brooke Callaghan; Melissa Jaffer
- Composer: Nerida Tyson Chew
- Country of origin: Australia
- Original language: English
- No. of seasons: 1
- No. of episodes: 26

Production
- Executive producers: Nick Wilson; Posie Graeme-Evans; Noel Price; Kris Noble
- Producers: Noel Price; Dennis Kiely
- Cinematography: Danny Batterham
- Production company: Southern Star

Original release
- Network: Nine Network
- Release: 29 September – 11 November 2003

Snobs is an Australian children's television series that aired from 29 September to 11 November 2003 on the Nine Network.

The series is set in Eden Beach, a fictional suburb of Sydney in its northern beaches district; and follows the story of a community of travellers known as "The Ferals" who decide to set up camp in the suburb, despite protest and anger from residents.

== Cast ==
=== Main ===
- Indiana Evans as Abby Oakley
- Ross Perrelli as Marian Freeman
- Ella Roberts as Pia Freeman
- Mathew Waters as Spike Freeman
- Brooke Callaghan as Brooke Bellingham
- Melissa Jaffer as Gwen Walston

=== Recurring ===
- Kerry Walker as Kizzy Freeman
- Craig Elliott as Tobar Freeman
- Vanessa Steele as Rose Freeman
- Nathy Gaffney as Rachel Oakley
- Alex Hughes as Ryan Grainger
- Miles Szanto as Sam Keogh
- Samuel Rosek as Charlie Oakley
- Katherine Merry as Carla Correlli
- Danny Nash as Jim Correlli
- Tim Campbell as Constable Stubbs
- Ann Burbrook as Mrs. Church
- John Derum as Mr. Alexander
- Rhonda Doyle as Clarissa Bellingham
- Trent Sierra as Banjo Freeman
- Matt Nicholls as Rollo
- Anthony Johnson as Freeman

=== Guests ===
- Heather Mitchell as Mary
- Peter Sumner as Doctor

== Plot ==
Abby Oakley (Indiana Evans), a girl from a wealthy middle-class family, and Marian Freeman (Ross Pirelli), a boy from the group of travellers, act as the main protagonists and form a close friendship despite their differences.

They are often joined by Spike Freeman (Mathew Waters) and Pia Freeman (Ella Roberts) and form the main character group in the show. The title of the show comes from the name of the genius Australian Cattle Dog mongrel featured in the show, owned by Marian, who acts as a constant companion.

Other major characters in the show are Brooke Bellingham (Brooke Callaghan), former best friend to Abby who, disappointed with her friend's choice of social group, tries many deceitful methods of winning her back, despite still wishing they could be best friends. However, when she learns the truth behind Abby's family tree, she abandons Abby with the future of their previous friendship in doubt.

Ryan Granger (Alex Hughes) and Sam Keogh (Miles Szanto) act as the bully characters. They are residents of Eden Beach who take particular interest in getting the Ferals out of town, and often resort to ridiculous and callous acts to achieve this, almost all of which backfire on them.

Rachel Oakley (Nathy Gaffney) is Abby's mother, who goes to enormous lengths to try to stop Abby seeing Marian, even going as far as threatening to send her to boarding school.

Tobar Freeman (Craig Elliott) is Marian's father, who at the time of moving to Eden Beach is on probation for robbery, a secret kept from Marian until it is revealed to him later in the series by Rachel Oakley.

Abby's grandmother Gwen (Melissa Jaffer) who Abby is sent to live with in the second part of the series after a series of incidents with her parents.

The story culminates in the Ferals leaving Eden Beach after Marian's father comes off probation, with Marian and his mother opting to stay behind when it is revealed he is in fact related to Abby and her brother, Charlie (Samuel Rosek), as Kizzy, the head of the Ferals, is the sister of Gwen. This emerges when Gwen attempts to persuade her family to remain in town so that Marian's kid brother, Banjo (Trent Sierra), who is deaf, can have a cochlear implant leading to Gwen taking temporary custody of Banjo until such time he has had his operation and fully recovered from it.
