= Adam Fidusiewicz =

Polish actor

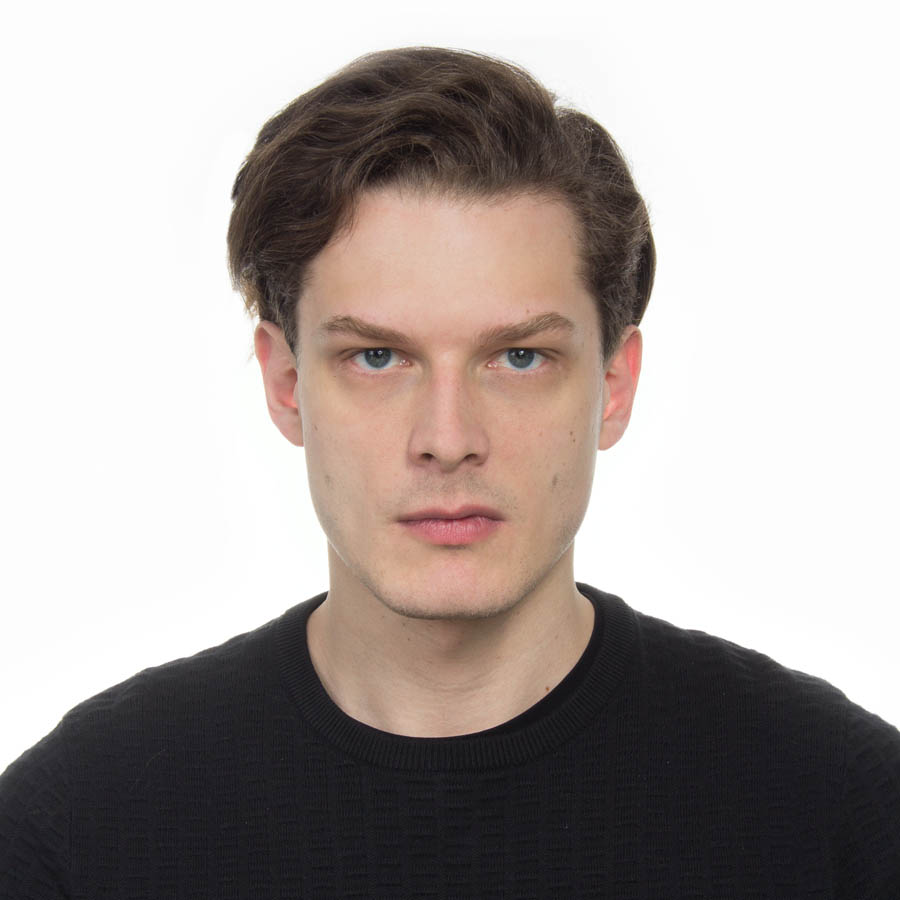
- Fidusiewicz in 2019
- Born: February 18, 1985 (age 41); Warsaw, Poland
- Occupation: Actor

Adam Fidusiewicz (born 18 February 1985) is a Polish actor.

== Studies ==
- 2004-2009: University of Social Science and Humanities
- 2009-2014: The Aleksander Zelwerowicz National Academy of Dramatic Art in Warsaw

== Filmography ==
- 1995: Różany Zamek as Promyk in TV Theatre by Wojciech Molski
- 1996: Likwidator as young boy in the mini series by Krzysztof Janczak
- 2001: In Desert and Wilderness as Staś Tarkowski in the film directed by Gavin Hood
- 2003–2019: Na Wspólnej as Maks Brzozowski
- 2008: Małgosia contra Małgosia as Krzysiek
- 2011: Na dobre i na złe (episode 462 "Dymisja" and episode 480 "Trudne decyzje") as young hacker Pilecki 'Pisklak'
- 2013: Bastian as Bastian in the film directed by Szymon Kubka
- 2014: Sailor's Tales as Coach in the film directed by Marcin Latałło
- 2014: Zobacz mnie – directed by Mateusz Michalski
- 2014: Czas Honoru: Powstanie as Wolf in the TVP2 series
- 2014: Passing Bells as German corporal in the TVP series
- 2015: O mnie się nie martw as Robert in the TVP2 series directed by Filip Zylber
- 2015: Ojciec Mateusz as Marek in the TVP series directed by Wojciech Nowak
- 2015: Crossing Lines as Artur Slomski in the TV series directed by Susan Tully
- 2015: Bodo as Hans in the TVP series directed by Michał Kwieciński
- 2018: Łowcy as a dancer
- 2019: Wypad as a rich kid
- 2020: Komisarz Mama as Michał Wojnar in the POLSAT series directed by Makary Janowski
- 2021: The Mire as Librarian in Netflix Poland series directed by Jan Holoubek
- 2022: Tom Clancy's Jack Ryan in Amazon Prime series directed by Assaf Bernstein
- 2022: Przyjaciółki as Simon in Polsat series
- 2022-2023: FBI International as Vlad in CBS series directed by Rob Greenlea and Avi Youabian
- 2023: The Stolen Art as Kajetan in WFDiF series directed by Paweł Wróbel
- 2023: A Gentleman in Moscow as Vladimir

== Theatre ==
- 1999: Piotruś Pan by J. M. Barrie in an adaptation by Jeremi Przybora – as Indian (directed by Janusz Józefowicz, music by Janusz Stokłosa, Teatr Muzyczny Roma in Warsaw)
- 2000: Musical Metro Agata i Maryna Miklaszewska – as young man (directed by Janusz Józefowicz, music by Janusz Stokłosa, Teatr Studio Buffo in Warsaw)
- 2004: Musical Romeo and Julia Bartosz Wierzbięta based on William Shakespeare's Romeo and Juliet – as Parys (directed by Janusz Józefowicz, music by Janusz Stokłosa, Teatr Studio Buffo in Warsaw)
- 2010: Enter – choreography preparation for the play (directed by Anna Smolar and Jacek Poniedziałek, Nowy Teatr in Warsaw)
- 2011: Pielgrzymi do Grobu Pańskiego by Johann Adolph Hasse – as Guide (directed by Aneta Groszyńska, Kamila Michalak, Jakub Kasprzak, Tomasz Szczepanek, under an eye of Ryszard Peryt, Teatr Collegium Nobilium in Warsaw)
- 2012: MP4 (directed by Mariusz Benoit, Teatr Powszechny im. Zygmunta Hübnera w Warszawie)
- 2012: Wesele Stanisław Wyspiański – as Kasper and Widmo (directed by Jarosław Gajewski, Teatr Collegium Nobilium in Warsaw)
- 2012: Warsztat - directed by Katarzyna Małachowska in Teatr Collegium Nobilium in Warsaw
- 2012: Juliett must die based on William Shakespeare's Romeo and Juliet – as Romeo (directed by Barbara Wiśniewska, The Aleksander Zelwerowicz National Academy of Dramatic Art in Warsaw). In October 2012 the play took part in Baltic House Theatre Festival in Petersburg, in February 2013 the play took part in SZEM Festival in Miskolc (Hungary), then the play was being shown in The International Theatre Schools Festival ITSELF in Warsaw, and in 56th Festival dei 2 Mondi di Spoleto in Italy.
- 2013: Scenariusz dla trzech aktorów Bogusława Schaeffera – as Dru (directed by Paweł Paszta, A Tu Theatre)
- 2013: Porwanie Sabinek Juliana Tuwima – as Emil (directed by Emilian Kamiński, Teatr Kamienica in Warsaw)
- 2013: Piosennik Program składany Andrzeja Poniedzielskiego – as poKosynier (directed by Andrzej Poniedzielski, Ateneum Theatre)
- 2013: Harce młodzieży polskiej Tomasza Śpiewaka – as scout Adam (directed by Remigiusz Brzyk, Teatr IMKA in Warsaw)

== Dubbing ==
- 2010: Ben & Holly's Little Kingdom
- 2011: Kickin' It –
  - Shane (episodes 58, 68)
  - Frank (episode 67)
  - Matt (episode 73)
- 2012: Leonardo – Michelangelo (episode 8)
- 2012: Gravity Falls
- 2012: Young Justice –
  - Thomas Kalmaku (episode 33)
  - Captain Cold (episode 34)
  - Virgil Hawkins/Static (episodes 40, 43, 46)
- 2013: Doraemon
- 2013: Packages from Planet X
- 2013: The Wizards Return: Alex vs. Alex – Dominic
- 2014: Big Hero 6
- 2014: Totally Spies! The Movie
- 2014: Syn Boży
- 2014: Captain America: The Winter Soldier
- 2014: Muppets Most Wanted
- 2014: Swindle – Darren Vader
- 2014: Pokémon – N
- 2015: Avengers: Age of Ultron
- 2015: Ant-Man
- 2015 Scooby-Doo! and Kiss: Rock and Roll Mystery - Demon
- 2015 Cinderella
