= The Phantom Horseman =

The Phantom Horseman may refer to:

- The Phantom Horseman (1924 film), American film
- The Phantom Horseman (1990 film), Australian film
