= Lungile =

Lungile is a given name. Notable people with the name include:

- Lungile Gongqa (born 1979), South African long-distance runner
- Lungile Pepeta (1974–2020), South African cardiologist
- Lungile Shongwe (born 1983), South African actress
- Lungile Tsolekile (born 1984), South African field hockey player
