= Gangster's Paradise: Jerusalema =

- Theatrical release poster
- Directed by: Ralph Ziman
- Written by: Ralph Ziman
- Produced by: Ralph Ziman; Tendeka Matatu
- Starring: Rapulana Seiphemo; Jeffrey Zekele; Robert Hobbs; Mzwandile Ngubeni
- Cinematography: Nic Hofmeyr
- Edited by: David Helfand
- Music by: Alan Lazar
- Distributed by: United International Pictures
- Release dates: February 2008 (Berlin International Film Festival); 29 August 2008
- Running time: 120 minutes
- Country: South Africa
- Languages: English; Zulu; Setswana
- Budget: $2 million
- Box office: $400,000

Gangster's Paradise: Jerusalema, originally titled Jerusalema, is a 2008 South African crime film written and directed by Ralph Ziman. The film was submitted to the 2009 Academy Awards to qualify as a nominee for Best Foreign Language Film. It was a box office bomb, grossing only $400,000 against the production budget of $2 million.

== Plot ==
The film begins with Lucky Kunene lying on a bed, covered in blood. Police officers barge into his room and arrest him for murder charges. The film cuts to the interrogation room, where Kunene says he will provide his full back-story.

The rest of the film tells Kunene's life story leading up to his arrest. The story begins with Kunene and his friend Zakes as teenagers living in the Soweto Township. Lucky learns he has not earned a scholarship to continue his education. In need of money, Kunene and Zakes meet a local crime lord, Nazareth, who was formerly a Russian-trained guerrilla. Nazareth sets up Lucky and Zakes with several small-time robberies. These crimes escalate to large-scale car-jackings, prompting Lucky to give up his educational aspirations. Lucky's final robbery goes horribly wrong, leaving Nazareth imprisoned and much of his crew dead. Lucky and Zakes narrowly escape. They decide to lie low and move to Johannesburg.

At this point, the film skips ahead ten years. Lucky and his friend now run a taxi business in the Hillbrow section of Johannesburg. They lose their business after Lucky himself is carjacked. Frustrated with his living conditions and inability to obtain economic mobility, Lucky creates the "Hillbrow People's Housing Trust". The trust allows Kunene to build an empire of apartment buildings in Hillbrow. He promises residents half price on their rent. Kunene collects all the residents' rent, then negotiates aggressively with landlords so that they accept the reduced rent. Kunene becomes a Robin Hood figure, gaining the title "The Hoodlum of Hillbrow". As Kunene builds his empire of residential buildings, Detective Blakkie Swart builds a case against Kunene.

Kunene next meets a white South African woman, Leah Friedlander. He helps rescue her brother, a drug addict, from drug dealers. After their encounter, Kunene begins a relationship with her. Kunene and Leah buy a house in the suburbs and move in together.

Kunene's success is marred throughout the second half of the film by a drug dealer named Tony Ngu. Kunene wants Ngu to leave so that he can build his empire without interference from drug lords. Nazareth, a member of Lucky's housing trust, becomes involved with Ngu and is eventually busted for drugs. Lucky describes the bust as "exactly the excuse Swart needed" to begin making arrests and demolishing Lucky's buildings.

Ngu, determined to fight back against Lucky's attempts to force him away, entices Leah's brother with drugs to sneak out of Lucky's house. Lucky goes after Leah's brother, but he is found dead. A troubled Lucky contemplates with Zakes about killing Ngu. Soon after, they are involved in a drive-by shooting, where Zakes is murdered. Lucky gathers his crew and storms a strip club where Ngu is spending the night. A furious gunfight ensues. Lucky murders Nazareth, and sustains serious injuries himself. Lucky chases Ngu onto the roof of the club. Ngu pleads with Lucky, telling him he will do anything to have his life spared. Lucky responds "can you bring Zakes back?" He shoots Ngu and pushes him off the roof. At this point, the back-story has caught up to the opening scene of the film. Lucky, bloodied and lying in bed, is arrested for murder.

In prison, Kunene quickly orchestrates his own escape. Kunene feigns illness, and is transported from prison to the hospital. There, Kunene is under less security. With the help of his remaining friends, he escapes and resides in Durban where he always dreamed of living there.

== Cast ==
- Rapulana Seiphemo as Lucky Kunene
- Ronnie Nyakale as Zakes Mbolelo
- Jeffrey Zekele as Nazareth
- Robert Hobbs as Detective Blakkie Swart
- Shelly Meskin as Leah Friedlander
- Malusi Skenjana as Tony Ngu
- Mzwandile Ngubeni as Young Bull
- Eugene Wanangwa Khumbanyiwa as Drug dealer
- Jafta Mamabolo as Young Lucky
- Thembsie Matu as The Loan Shark
- Sello Motloung as Detective Modisane
- Bubu Mazibuko as Older Nomsa

== Production ==
Gangster's Paradise: Jerusalema is based on the story of Lucky Kunene, an underworld figure who in the 1990s took over real estate in the Hillbrow neighborhood of Johannesburg, South Africa. Writer-director Ralph Ziman learned and investigated about how a successful businessman bought buildings in Hillbrow through Legal Purchase and began researching the phenomenon, interviewing reporters, police officers, social workers, and lawyers and discovering that this practice was commonplace. Ziman wrote the script for Jerusalema based on his research. He said of the film and its title, "I wanted Jerusalema to take a harsh but realistic look at Johannesburg, but I also wanted to reflect the hopes and aspirations of its citizens. When you look at Hillbrow from a distance, it does look like that shining city on a hill, the New Jerusalem that will be our salvation, but when you get onto its streets, you find another story." The director also used an African hymn, "Jerusalema", throughout the film, saying of the intent, "[It] might seem pretty cynical but it also underlines a continuing sense of hope." Ziman also sought to connect the crime wave to the political changes taking place in South Africa.

Producer Tendeka Matatu said the characters were based on sketches from their research for the film. The producer said of the character's background: "During the research of the script we came across many MK vets who are living on the very edge of poverty and who, after fighting for a better life for all, now feel betrayed."

Production of Jerusalema was difficult because the filmmakers struggled to find a budget when South Africa's National Film and Video Foundation would not invest in their project. The filmmakers found enough financing to make the film, and Ziman reflected that the budget was smaller than music videos he had directed. Ziman said of the experience, "We used skateboards as dollies on the set and old-technology cameras to film. We cut down on the crew but I don't think anyone who sees the film will realise that."

== Release ==
Gangster's Paradise: Jerusalema's filmmakers initially sought to distribute the film in theaters through the South African cinema chain Ster-Kinekor, but because the filmmakers sought to hold onto rights for release on DVD and TV, the chain chose not to back them. Instead, the filmmakers found backing from Metro FM and the Gauteng Film Commission, which helped them with publicity, including a premiere in Berlin. Jerusalema premiered at the Berlin International Film Festival on 11 February 2008. The film was commercially released in South Africa on 29 August 2008, and the film was well received by critics and audiences. Jerusalema grossed US$400,000 at 14 theaters in the course of a month. The South African film was submitted to the Academy Awards for consideration to qualify as a nominee for Best Foreign Language Film. The film was expected to succeed Tsotsi as the next South African contender for the award, but Ziman's film was not selected.

Robert McKay of South Africa's The Times wrote of Jerusalema, "Having shirked off the burden of the heavy, heavy lessons of apartheid in favour of drug deals, shoot-outs and armed robberies, Jerusalema is as quick and devastating as a smash and grab." He said of the direction, "Ziman's extensive experience as a music video director ... makes Jerusalema crackle with energy."

The Umkhonto we Sizwe Military Veterans' Association criticized the film for its portrayal of the military veterans. Its national chairperson, Kebby Maphatsoe, said, "The insult is painful as it does not afford the people of South Africa and our children the opportunity to learn the truth about their history." The United Congregational Church of Southern Africa criticized the film for its title, based on the holy city of Jerusalem, where the film portrayed a criminal underworld. The Evangelical Lutheran Church in Southern Africa also criticized how the Biblical name Nazareth was used for a gangster's name.

== See also ==
- List of South African submissions for the Academy Award for Best Foreign Language Film
