= The Rogue Stallion =

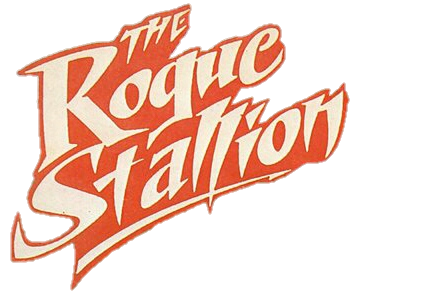
- Genre: Action, Adventure, Family
- Created by: Roger Mirams
- Written by: Ysabelle Dean; Rick Maier
- Directed by: Henri Safran
- Starring: Beth Buchanan; Brian Rooney
- Composer: Mike Harvey
- Country of origin: Australia
- Original language: English

Production
- Executive producer: Roger Mirams
- Producers: Don Reynolds; Philip East
- Production location: New Zealand
- Cinematography: John McLean
- Editor: David Huggett
- Production companies: Grundy Television; South Pacific Pictures
- Budget: $1 million

Original release
- Release: 1990

The Rogue Stallion is a 1990 Australian television film, part of the South Pacific Adventure Series, following the story of teenage Anna Peterson (Beth Buchanan) who moves to the fictitious town of Charlton, New Zealand with her mother, Rose (Michele Fawdon), and brother, Mike (Andrew Shepherd), following the tragic death of her father, John Peterson (Bruno Lawrence), in Australia, only to find herself embroiled in a bitter local feud between a prominent local horse breeder, Mr. Garrett (Peter McAllum), and a brumby.

Produced by Grundy Television in Australia, the film was also released in the United States by Feature Films for Families.

== Cast ==
- Beth Buchanan as Anna Peterson
- Brian Rooney as Wayne Garrett
- Bruno Lawrence as John Peterson
- Michele Fawdon as Rose Peterson
- Andrew Shepherd as Mike
- Peter McAllum as Mr Garrett
- John Watson as Mr. George Peabody
- Dean O'Gorman as Tony
- Jodie Rimmer as Ginny Garrett
- Beaver as Jean Bailey
- Jose Maria Caffarel as Old Gonzalez

== Plot ==
The Peterson family's life in Sydney, Australia, is upended following the death of John Peterson in a stable accident. His widow, Rose, decides to use a recent racing bonus to fulfill John's dream of returning to his ancestral home in Charlton, New Zealand, taking their teenage daughter Anna and younger son Mike with her. Close to their destination, they are run off the road by Mr. Garrett, a wealthy horse breeder obsessed with capturing a brumby, referred to locally as a "rogue", that roams the area. Their introduction to the town is further marred when they receive a cold shoulder by local grocer George Peabody (John Watson) and subsequently find the family homestead in a state of severe disrepair.

Integration into the community proves difficult as Garrett harbors a long-standing grudge against the late John Peterson, fueled by a rumor that John had killed one of Garrett's best mares years prior. While the local veterinarian and bus driver, Jean Bailey (Beaver), welcomes the family, two of Garrett's children, Tony (Dean O'Gorman) and Ginny (Jodie Rimmer), subject Anna and Mike to persistent bullying at school. Rose, traumatized by her husband's death, forbids her children from being around horses, but Anna’s passion leads her to sneak away to the local Pony Club. There, she publicly confronts Garrett for his heavy-handed treatment of his prize horse, Eclipse.

Seeking revenge for a school bus fight incident, Ginny and Tony trick Anna into riding Eclipse, then pelt the horse with stones to make it bolt. Anna is thrown and Eclipse disappears into the woods. Anna runs into the woods in search of the horse and is marked as missing by her family and the local authorities. Garret's oldest, Wayne (Brian Rooney) is against his siblings' mistreatment of the Petersons and distances himself from their actions. While searching for the horse, Anna narrowly avoids falling into a camouflaged horse trap dug by Garrett’s stockmen. Upon finding Eclipse stuck in a bog, she also comes across Old Gonzalez (José María Caffarel), a mysterious hermit falsely rumored to be a murderer. In reality, Gonzalez is a gentle man who maintains a secret animal sanctuary. With the help of the wild stallion, whom Gonzalez calls "Wildfire" (Fuego Salvaje), they rescue Eclipse take her to the sanctuary to recover.

Back in town, Ginny and Tony accuse Anna of horse theft to cover their own tracks, prompting Garrett to pressure the Petersons to leave New Zealand altogether. Wayne eventually finds Anna at Old Gonzales' sanctuary. There, Gonzalez reveals the truth of the historical feud: years ago, Garrett had been caught by John Peterson whipping a stallion. To frame John, Garrett intentionally left a stable door open, allowing the horse to escape and injure itself, which resulted in John being fired and exiled from town.

The situation reaches a crisis when young Mike, having snuck out of their home to search for his sister, falls into one of Garrett’s traps and is seriously injured. Desperate, Anna forms a bond with Wildfire, riding the brumby into town to seek medical help. The accident initially makes Rose resolve to return to Australia and Anna, greatly distraught, leaves the hospital to say farewell to Old Gonzales and Wildfire. Meanwhile, Jean Bailey rallies the community to stand up to Garrett’s intimidation and support the family instead.

In a final pursuit, Garrett follows Anna to Gonzalez' sanctuary and attempts to shoot Wildfire there. He chases the horse to a cliffside where Wildfire leaps into the rapids below and is presumed drowned. Furious, Gonzalez publicly shames Garrett in front of his stockmen for his arrogance and his role in the sabotage years earlier, revealing the truth about John Peterson and clearing his name. In the aftermath, Mr. Garret is disgraced among the townspeople, including Garrett's stockmen, who hold a "working bee" to restore the Peterson homestead. Wayne regains his confidence and returns to riding, revealing to Anna that Wildfire survived the fall. The film ends with the two teenagers riding through the New Zealand hills together.

== See also ==
- List of films about horses
