= The Scalp Merchant =

- Promotional poster
- Written by: Ian Coughlan
- Directed by: Howard Rubie
- Starring: John Waters; Cameron Mitchell; Elizabeth Alexander
- Country of origin: Australia
- Original language: English

Production
- Producer: Roger Mirams
- Running time: 100 mins

Original release
- Network: Grundy Organisation
- Release: 1978

The Scalp Merchant is a 1978 Australian television film directed by Howard Rubie. It is about a private investigator.

== Plot synopsis ==
A private investigator is brought in to help recover the dough that was stolen from an Australian timber company and thinks that the box the money was taken in has been hidden in a lake. When a search team heads in the direction of where the box may be located, dangerous things begin to happen.

== Cast ==
- John Waters as Cliff Rowan
- Elizabeth Alexander
- Ron Haddrick
- Ric Hutton
- Cameron Mitchell as Riley
- Joan Sydney
- Margaret Nelson
- Edgar Metcalfe as The Minister
- Steve Jodrell as Downey
- Helen Hough
