= Escape of the Artful Dodger =

Television series

- Country of origin: Australia
- No. of seasons: 1
- No. of episodes: 13

Production
- Executive producers: Andrew Brooke; Kris Noble
- Producers: Roger Mirams; Howard Rubie
- Running time: 24 min

Original release
- Network: Nine Network
- Release: 17 September – 10 December 2001

Escape of the Artful Dodger is an Australian children's television series first screened on the Nine Network in 2001. The plot is an epilogue to the Charles Dickens novel Oliver Twist, portraying the character of Jack Dawkins in colonial New South Wales. While he remains a nimble-fingered young pickpocket, the "Artful Dodger" has been adapted slightly to be more appealing to younger audiences, behaving more llike a benevolent Robin Hood.

== Plot ==
Having been deported to Australia along with fellow crook Will Grady while Oliver Twist and Hannah Schuller are on their way to join up with Hannah's brother Michael, Dodger and his new friends find themselves facing obstacles along the way, namely, the tyranny and cruelty of the corrupt Sergeant Bates.

== Cast ==
- Luke O'Loughlin as Dodger
- Rowan Witt as Oliver Twist
- Brittany Byrnes as Hannah Schuller
- Simon Scarlett as Wild Will Grady
- Barry Langrishe as Sergeant Bates
- Mathew Waters as Scratch
- Henri Szeps as Dr. Hartman
- Phillip Hinton as Mr. Brownlow
- Maggie Blinco as Mrs Posset
- Kate Sherman as Becky
- Christopher Baz as Fagin
- Bill Conn as Mr Butterfield
- Aurora Voss as Kelly
- Shane Briant as Colonel Springs
- Richard Wilson as Lord Edward Tuxley
- Brian Rooney as Cedric
- Peter Whitford as Father O'Brien
- Linal Haft as Mr. Micawber
- Peter Gwynne as Uriah Heep
- John Meillon Jr. as Charles Dickens

== See also ==
- List of Australian television series
