= Andrzej Strzelecki =

Polish film and theater actor (1952–2020)

Andrzej Tadeusz Strzelecki
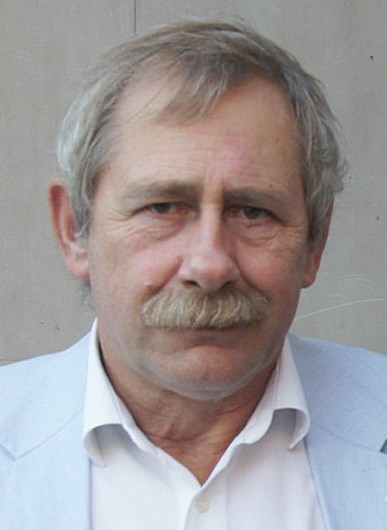
- Born: 4 February 1952; Warsaw, Poland
- Died: 17 July 2020 (aged 68); Warsaw
- Education: The Aleksander Zelwerowicz National Academy of Dramatic Art in Warsaw
- Occupation: Actor
- Years active: 1967–2020
- Spouse: Joanna Pałucka
- Children: 2

Andrzej Tadeusz Strzelecki (4 February 1952 – 17 July 2020), was a Polish actor, satirist, theatre director, screenplay writer and rector of the Aleksander Zelwerowicz National Academy of Dramatic Art in Warsaw in the years 2008–2016.

== Biography ==
In 1974 he graduated from the Acting Department of the National Academy of Dramatic Art in Warsaw, and in 1978 from the Directing Department. He played on stage in the Variety Theatre (1974–1981) and the Rampa Theatre (1987–1997) in Warsaw. As a TV announcer, he has hosted a number of programs for Telewizja Polska. Andrzej Strzelecki was awarded many times for his film and theatrical roles as well as for directorial work. As an actor, he also played in television series. In 2004 he was awarded the title of Professor of Theater Arts. Strzelecki was passionate about golf.

He died of lung and bronchial cancer.

== Selected filmography ==
- 1967: Kiedy miłość była zbrodnią as Boy from Hitlerjugend
- 1976: Excuse Me, Is It Here They Beat Up People? as Show Host
- 1999–2020: Klan (TV series) as Tadeusz Koziełło
- 2001: In Desert and Wilderness as Mr. Georg Rawlison
- 2008: Rozmowy nocą
- 2011: Battle of Warsaw 1920 as Wincenty Witos
- 2017: Barwy szczęścia as Czarnoleski
- 2019: Pół wieku poezji później as Wloscibyt, Head of a Village
