= Brian Rooney (actor) =

British actor (born 1972)

- Born: 2 November 1972 (age 54); Belfast, Northern Ireland
- Occupation: Actor
- Years active: 1988–present

Brian Rooney (born 2 November 1972) is a Northern Irish-born Australian actor with film, television and stage credits. He is best known for his childhood television performances, in particular the part of Michael Winters in G.P.. He appeared in the children's television productions of The Ferals as Leonard, and Spellbinder as Alex Katsonis.

== Career ==
Rooney first appeared on Australian television on Network 10 in Adelaide, South Australia on the Grundy Television show Pot Luck. He sang Take My Breath Away, but lost to Roy Handley, who performed the Acker Bilk song Stranger on the Shore. Both Handley and Rooney were told by the show's celebrity judge, Adelaide based TV and radio personality Anne Wills, that they should try acting as they had the "face for television". Consequently, Rooney auditioned with the Australian Broadcasting Corporation for a role on G.P..

Rooney began his career playing the street-wise urchin Gavroche in the Australian stage production of Les Misérables. Soon after, he went on to play the character Tommy Franco, alongside Dolph Lundgren and Louis Gossett Jr., in the 1989 feature film The Punisher.

As a child actor, Rooney became best known on Australian television during the early 1990s for his long-running role of Michael Winters in the ABC-TV series G.P., and as Brendan Maloney in the 1991 miniseries Brides of Christ. He has appeared in a number of television films including The Rogue Stallion (1990), The Phantom Horseman (1991), and Pirates Island (1991).

More recently Rooney played the role of Cedric in the 2001 children's television series Escape of the Artful Dodger. In 2010, he guest starred as the character Jones in Rescue: Special Ops (Season 2, Episode 12).

== Filmography ==
=== Film ===
Title	Year	Role	Notes
The Punisher	1989	Tommy Franco	Feature film
Charcoal	1999	Kev	Short film
The Great Gatsby	2013	Clerk – Probity Trust	Feature film
Yellow Eyes	2026	Abbott Penrose	Feature film

=== Television ===
Title	Year	Role	Notes
Rafferty's Rules	1988	Tommy	1 episode
G.P.	1989-95	Michael Winters	Main role (seasons 1–3); Recurring role (season 4); Guest role (seasons 5 & 7); 133 episodes
The Rogue Stallion	1990	Wayne Garrett	TV film
Brides of Christ	1991	Brendan Maloney	Miniseries; 2 episodes
Pirates Island	1990	Jim	TV film
The Phantom Horseman	1991	Toby	TV film
Mission Top Secret	1991	Jim	TV film
The Ferals	1994–95	Leonard	Main role
Spellbinder	1995	Alex Katsonis	Main role
Big Sky	1997	Jigger	1 episode
All Saints	1998	Robbie Watson	1 episode
Kings in Grass Castles	1998	J. W. (aged 19)	Miniseries; 1 episode
Murder Call	1999	Nero	1 episode
Escape of the Artful Dodger	2001	Cedric	1 episode
Rescue: Special Ops	2010	Jim Jones	1 episode
Tricky Business	2012	Hamish Kelly	1 episode
The Moodys	2014	Benji	1 episode
Mr Inbetween	2021	Dan	1 episode
