= I Know Leopard =

Australian musical group

- Origin: Sydney, Australia
- Genres: Art pop; dream pop; synthpop; indie pop; indie rock
- Years active: 2012–2022
- Label: Ivy League Records
- Spinoff of: These New South Whales
- Past members: Luke O'Loughlin; Rosie Fitzgerald; Jennifer McCullagh; Matt DeGris; Jade Eley; Todd Andrews
- Website: iknowleopard.com

I Know Leopard were an Australian pop band from Sydney. The band was formed in 2012 by lead vocalist and keyboardist Luke O'Loughlin. The band underwent multiple line-up changes, with its final iteration also featuring Rosie Fitzgerald on bass and Jennifer McCullagh on violin and keyboards. They released their debut and only album, Love is a Landmine, in 2019.

== History ==
The band was formed in 2012 between friends Luke O'Loughlin, Matt DeGris, Jade Eley and Todd Andrews after they relocated from Adelaide to Sydney. O'Loughlin and Andrews had formed a punk band, These New South Whales, the year before – with O'Loughlin on drums and Andrews on guitar. Soon after forming, I Know Leopard released their debut EP, Embers.

In 2014, the band signed to Ivy League Records, through which they released their second EP, Illumina. Shortly after this, the band saw the arrival of Jennifer McCullagh and the departure of Eley. The EP saw success on triple j, and the band won the Sydney slot for the 2015 Laneway Festival through the stations triple j competition.

In 2015, the lineup changed once again with the departure of DeGris and the arrival of Rosie Fitzgerald. Later in the year, the band released their third EP Another Life. The songs "Close Your Eyes", "Perfect Picture" and "Another Life" all received significant airplay on triple j. The band released the singles "Rather Be Lonely" and "Let Go" in 2016 and 2017, respectively, with both singles also receiving strong airplay on triple j.

In 2018, the band released the song "Landmine", which would later come in at No. 177 in that year's triple j Hottest 200. The following year, the band released the singles "Heather" and "Seventy Lies", and in April 2019 they released their debut album Love is a Landmine. The album debuted and peaked at No. 39 on the ARIA Charts. The album was also nominated for the Australian Music Prize, and received Album of the Week at Sydney Community Radio station FBi Radio. The fourth single from the album, "Everything Goes With You", was released in August 2019 and was a nominee for the 2019 Vanda & Young Global Songwriting Competition.

In 2019, O'Loughlin and Fitzgerald announced that they had been in a romantic relationship for a few years. This relationship, and the breakdowns that happened around it, aided in the creation of music for their debut LP Love is a Landmine, which O'Loughlin described as "therapy". Andrews, having sat out of touring since the release of Love is a Landmine, left the band permanently in 2020 to focus on These New South Whales. In 2021, the band returned with a new single, "Lover Automatic". This was followed later in the year with a further two stand-alone singles, "Day 2 Day" and "Good As What You Give". The band released one last single, "Nothing is Real", and played a run of shows in late 2022 before quietly disbanding.

== Touring ==
The band embarked on several national tours over the years, including the Love is a Landmine album tour in mid-2019 which saw them selling out and playing to thousands of people across Australia, and the "Everything Goes With You" national tour in November 2019, named after a song from the band's debut album. The band also played a number of notable festivals, including Lost Lands, Festival of the Sun and Beyond the Valley in 2019 and Party in the Paddock in 2020. The band supported A-ha and Rick Astley on tour across Australia in February 2020.

== Members ==
=== Final line-up ===
- Luke O'Loughlin – lead vocals, keyboards (2012–2022)
- Jennifer McCullagh – violin, keyboards, backing vocals (2013–2022)
- Rosie Fitzgerald – bass, synthesizer, backing vocals (2015–2022)

=== Former members ===
- Matt DeGris – drums (2012–2015)
- Jade Eley – bass, backing vocals (2012–2013)
- Todd Andrews – guitar (2012–2020)

=== Former touring musicians ===
- Jack Moffitt – guitar
- Luke Davison – drums
- Tully Ryan – drums

== Discography ==
=== Albums ===
Title	Album details	Peak chart positions
Title	Album details	AUS
Love is a Landmine	Release date: 5 April 2019; Label: Ivy League Records; Formats: Vinyl, CD, digital download	39

=== EPs ===
Title	Album details
Embers	Release date: 2012; Label: Independent; Formats: CD, Digital download
Illumina	Release date: 16 May 2014; Label: Ivy League Records; Formats: CD, Digital download
Another Life	Release date: 14 September 2015; Label: Ivy League Records; Formats: CD, Digital download

=== Singles ===
List of singles, with selected chart positions
Year	Title	Album
2012	"Embers"	Embers
2012	"Useless"	Embers
2014	"Hold This Tight"	Illumina
2015	"Perfect Picture"	Another Life
2015	"Close My Eyes"	Another Life
2016	"Rather Be Lonely"	Non-album singles
2017	"Let Go"	Non-album singles
2018	"Landmine"	Love is a Landmine
2019	"Heather"	Love is a Landmine
2019	"Seventy Lies"	Love is a Landmine
2019	"Everything Goes With You"	Love is a Landmine
2021	"Lover Automatic"	Non-album singles
2021	"Day 2 Day"	Non-album singles
2021	"Good As What You Give"	Non-album singles
2022	"Nothing is Real"	Non-album singles

== Awards and nominations ==
=== National Live Music Awards ===
The National Live Music Awards (NLMAs) are a broad recognition of Australia's diverse live industry, celebrating the success of the Australian live scene. The awards commenced in 2016.

Year	Nominee / work	Award	Result
National Live Music Awards of 2019	Rosie Fitzgerald (I Know Leopard)	Live Bassist of the Year	Nominated
National Live Music Awards of 2019	Jennifer McCullagh (I Know Leopard)	Live Instrumentalist of the Year	Nominated
