= The Haunting of Hewie Dowker =

- Written by: Ian Coughlan
- Directed by: Howard Rubie
- Starring: John Waters; Kate Fitzpatrick
- Country of origin: Australia
- Original language: English

Production
- Producer: Roger Mirams
- Running time: 75 minute
- Production company: United Telecasts

Original release
- Network: Network Ten
- Release: 6 November 1976

The Haunting of Hewie Dowker is a 1976 Australian film about Hewie Dowker, a Sydney cop who discovers he has psychic powers.

== Synopsis ==
Sydney police officer Hewie Dowker begins to realise he possesses psychic abilities, as recurrent visions of a young girl being murdered during a black mass begin to haunt him.

== Cast ==
- John Waters as Howie Dowker
- Kate Fitzpatrick
- Ron Haddrick
- Tony Barry as Police officer
- Walter Sullivan as Police officer
