= Luke O'Loughlin =

Australian actor

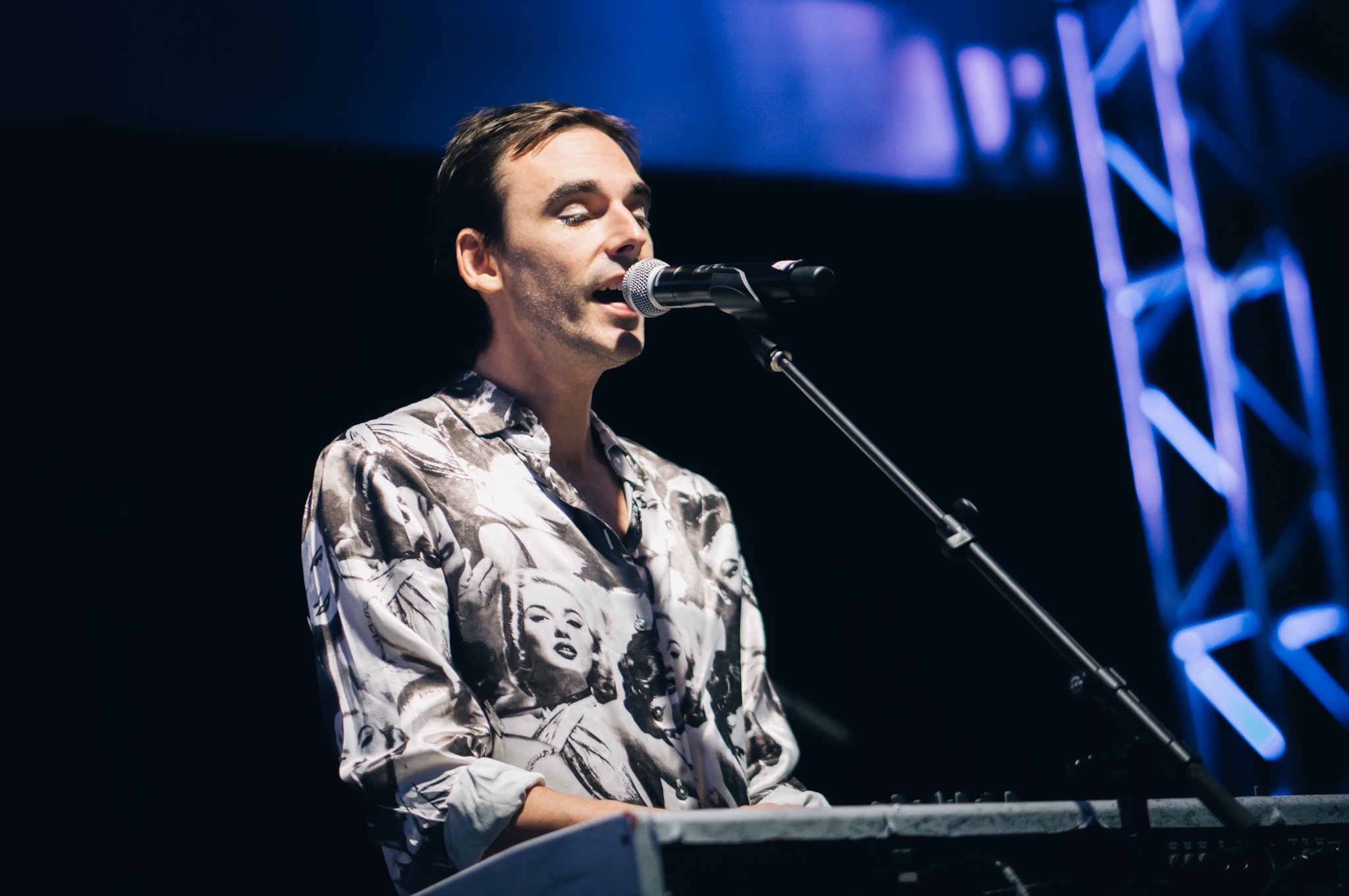
- O'Loughlin performing in I Know Leopard at SXSW in 2019
- Born: 23 December 1985 (age 40); Adelaide, South Australia, Australia
- Occupations: Actor; musician
- Years active: 1999–present

Luke O'Loughlin (born 23 December 1985) is an Australian musician and former actor.

== Early life ==
O'Loughlin was born in Adelaide, the only child of model Tanya Powell of Tanya Powell Model Agency and Jack O'Loughlin. Growing up, O'Loughlin listened to his parents’ Electric Light Orchestra, 10cc and The Alan Parsons Project records on repeat which has inspired some of his work with I Know Leopard. He is a graduate of University Senior College.

== Career ==
O'Loughlin is best known playing the title character in the Seven Network children's television series, Chuck Finn where he played a Canadian teenager who moved to Australia where he discovers a paddle steamer occupied by ghosts.

In 2002, O'Loughlin won an Australian Film Institute Best Young Actor nomination for Escape of the Artful Dodger.

Currently, O'Loughlin is the lead vocalist and keyboardist in the Australian band I Know Leopard. He was formerly the lead vocalist of New Navy, and the drummer of the Sydney punk outfit These New South Whales.

O'Loughlin has also co-written with other artists, such as Foster The People and electronic duo The Knocks on their 2020 single ‘All About You’.

== Personal life ==
O'Loughlin was previously in a relationship with Rosie Fizgerald, the bassist from I Know Leopard.

== Filmography ==
=== Film ===
- Sally Marshall Is Not an Alien (1999)
- The Road Ahead (2005)
- Hair Today, Gone Tomorrow (2007)
- The Boys are Back (2009)
- Broken Hill(2009)

=== Television ===
- Chuck Finn (1999–2000) - Charles "Chuck" Finn
- Escape of the Artful Dodger (2001) - Jack Dawkins/The Artful Dodger
- Scooter:Secret Agent (2005)

=== Theatre ===
- Equus (August 2003) - Alan Strang, performed at the Little Theatre, Adelaide

=== Music ===
- I Know Leopard
- New Navy
- These New South Whales
