= Chuck Finn =

1999 Australian children's TV series

- Created by: Paul D. Barron; Peter Hepworth
- Starring: Luke O'Loughlin; Cassandra Kane; Johnny Nicolaidis; Larena Charlesworth; Amelia Knight; Glenn McMillan; Thomas Lambert; Jonathan Tabaka; Andy Seymour; Holly Myers
- Opening theme: "Down by the River"
- Ending theme: "Down by the River"
- Composer: Mike Brady
- Country of origin: Australia
- Original language: English
- No. of seasons: 2
- No. of episodes: 32

Production
- Executive producers: Paul D. Barron; Joan Peters
- Editor: Tania Nehme
- Camera setup: Video; Multiple camera
- Running time: 24 minutes
- Production company: Barron Television

Original release
- Network: Seven Network
- Release: 18 October 1999 – 25 December 2000

Chuck Finn is an Australian children's fantasy television series created by Paul Barron and Peter Hepworth. It was produced by Barron Television and aired on the Seven Network from 18 October 1999 to 25 December 2000, throughout its initial run, it was split into 2 seasons, spanning a total of 32 episodes.

== Synopsis ==
Charles "Chuck" Finn is a 13-year-old Canadian boy who had just moved to the fictional town of Tingalla, South Australia, situated next to the Murray River. At first, Chuck struggles to cope with having a new life and desires going back to his hometown in Toronto, but he then comes across a run down paddle steamer known as The Tingalla Rose. The vessel is occupied by two ghosts named Elvira "Fingers" Fitzpatrick, a Victorian era woman and Buddy Berry, a 1950s rock and roll singer who were both passengers on board when they died. He also befriends a group of locals; Hamish, Becky, Linda and Sarah McDonald, the latter who is the daughter of the current captain of The Tingalla Rose. These events lead to Chuck accepting Tingalla as his new home. The course of the series has the group trying to get the vessel back in business as it was in the previous century while competing with a rival vessel, The River Queen. They also come to terms with resident bully, Theodore "Tiny" Maloney and his friends, Davo and Spider.

== Cast ==
=== Main / regular ===
- Luke O'Loughlin as Charles "Chuck" Finn
- Cassandra Kane as Sarah McDonald
- Johnny Nicolaidis as Hamish
- Larena Charlesworth as Linda
- Amelia Knight as Becky
- Glenn McMillan as Theodore "Tiny" Maloney
- Thomas Lambert as Davo
- Jonathan Tabaka as Spider
- Andy Seymour as Buddy Berry
- Holly Myers as Elvira "Fingers" Fitzpatrick
- Irena Dangov as Edna Littlemore
- Ted McQueen-Mason as Herman Littlemore
- Carmel Johnson as Mrs Bonaface

=== Guests ===
- Ben Nicholas as Sam (1 episode)
- Bruce Spence as Professor Heinz (1 episode)
- Bud Tingwell as Old Snowy (1 episode)
- Doris Younane as Natasha (1 episode)
- Frankie J. Holden as Syd (1 episode)
- Garry McDonald as Tony Rigatoni (1 episode)
- Gary Sweet as Captain Candlelight (1 episode)
- Kristy Wright as Rosy (1 episode)
- Kym Gyngell as Mr Jones (1 episode)
- Mary-Anne Fahey as Dr McCorquondale (1 episode)
- Matthew Newton as Dr Finlay / Steven Stevens (1 episode)
- Michael Veitch as Franke Tingalla (1 episode)
- Peter Rowsthorn as Drake (1 episode)
- Red Symons as Dr Vetrone (1 episode)

== Production ==
The series was edited by Tania Nehme, who went on to win several awards.
