= The Settlement (1984 film) =

- Directed by: Howard Rubie
- Written by: Ted Roberts
- Starring: Bill Kerr; John Jarratt
- Release date: 1984
- Country: Australia
- Language: English

The Settlement is a 1984 Australian film directed by Howard Rubie and starring Bill Kerr and John Jarratt. It is set in Queensland in the 1950s.

== Cast ==
- Bill Kerr as Kearney
- John Jarratt as Tommy Martin
- Lorna Lesley as Joycie
- Alan Cassell as Lohan

== Plot ==
When two friendly drifters, Jack Kearney (Bill Kerr) and Tommy Martin (John Jarratt) wander into the sleepy country township of Cedar Creek, there is nothing to prepare the innocent locals for the spectacle destined to unfold.

Intent to make loose ends meet and fill their empty pockets by swindling money from some of the naive locals, the two fellas settle in an abandoned shack on the outskirts of town. Befriended by former prostitute and social outcast Joycie (Lorna Lesley), the two open-minded men welcome her into their home and their hearts, setting in motion a town scandal of considerable concern.

Establishing a sensational ménage à trois in an otherwise highly conservative environment, the loving threesome face the wrath of the greater community, as others in the town strongly disapprove of their new-age living arrangements and set their sights on a bit of good old fashioned outback home-wrecking.

== Production ==
The film was shot over four weeks just outside Brisbane.

== Reception ==
Bob Ellis later called it:

A wonderful film. It's a great film. It's like a film that Lawson never wrote but might have. It's sort of a menage a trois outside a country town. I like, particularly, the man played by Tony Barry. He waits for his wife outside while she goes to church. That's what my father did to my mother.
