= Yellow Eyes (film) =

2026 supernatural horror film

- Theatrical release poster
- Directed by: Jesse Korman
- Written by: Mickey Solis
- Produced by: Jordan Beckerman; Ben Gojer; Will Hirschfeld; Jordan Yale Levine; Joe Swanberg
- Starring: Nena Martins; Michael Kunicki; Jimmy Chung; Brian Rooney
- Edited by: Kevin Kaufman
- Music by: Brett Detar
- Production companies: Terror Town; Great Escape; Yale Productions
- Distributed by: Inaugural Entertainment
- Release dates: August 18, 2026 (VOD); August 23, 2026 (Rivoli Theater)
- Running time: 86 minutes
- Country: United States
- Language: English

Yellow Eyes is a 2026 American independent supernatural horror film directed by Jesse Korman and written by Mickey Solis. Produced by indie filmmaker Joe Swanberg, the film stars Nena Martins and Michael Kunicki. It follows a young couple whose lives are upended after inheriting a rural New England property hiding an ancient, cursed artifact. The film was released digitally in the United States by Screambox and Cineverse on August 18, 2026.

== Cast ==
- Nena Martins as Julia
- Michael Kunicki as Brad
- Margo O'Connell as Lana
- Jimmy Chung
- Joette Waters
- DeVaughn Loman
- Brian Rooney as Abbott Penrose

== Production ==
The film was directed by Jesse Korman and penned by screenwriter Mickey Solis. It was backed by notable indie producer Joe Swanberg alongside Jordan Yale Levine and Jordan Beckerman. Principal photography captured the rustic, isolated atmosphere of a rural New England setting to heighten the traditional, old-school possession narrative.

The film started filming on June 17 and wrapped on July 2, 2024. The production is filming in South Shore next to Hyde Park, Chicago.

=== Music ===
The film's score and soundtrack features contributions from the mathcore band The Number Twelve Looks Like You, fronted by the film's director Jesse Korman. Rather than a traditional orchestral score, the band incorporated tracks such as the singles "Eyes on the Fireworks" and "Indeciso" to build the film's tense atmosphere.

== Release ==
Yellow Eyes was acquired for distribution by Inaugural Entertainment and released via the horror streaming platform Screambox (alongside Cineverse) on August 18, 2026. And there's a one night only screening at Rivoli Theater in Sylvan Street, Rutherford, NJ on August 23, 2026.

== Reception ==
Reviewers noted that the film attempts to subvert standard subgenre tropes by avoiding typical clichés—such as extensive Latin-chanting or binding victims to beds—while leaning into a darker sense of humor and gritty character dynamics. Critics highlighted Nena Martins' grounded performance as the beleaguered spouse, though responses to Michael Kunicki's manic portrayal of the possessed lead were more mixed.

Robert W. Monk of Flickering Myth gave the film a positive feedback and a 3 over 5 rating and he said: Yellow Eyes is an enjoyable watch for scare fans who appreciate a traditional possession tale with a fresh spin.
