= Island Trader =

Island Trader is a 1982 Australian TV movie directed by Howard Rubie and starring John Ewart, Sancho Gracia, Eric Oldfield and Ruth Cracknell.

It was written by Ron McLean for Reg Grundy Productions.

== Plot ==
A plane transporting a cargo of treasure crashes, and a group of kids set off on a quest to find it - doing battle with an evil ship's captain in the process.

== Cast ==
- John Ewart
- Sancho Gracia
- Eric Oldfield
- Ruth Cracknell as Victoria
- Heleen Rebel
- Neil Fitzpatrick
- Beth Buchanan as Joanne
- Dave Manning as Mike
- Tony Blackett
- David Phillips as Radio Operator (uncredited)
