= Karolina Sawka =

Polish actress (born 1991)

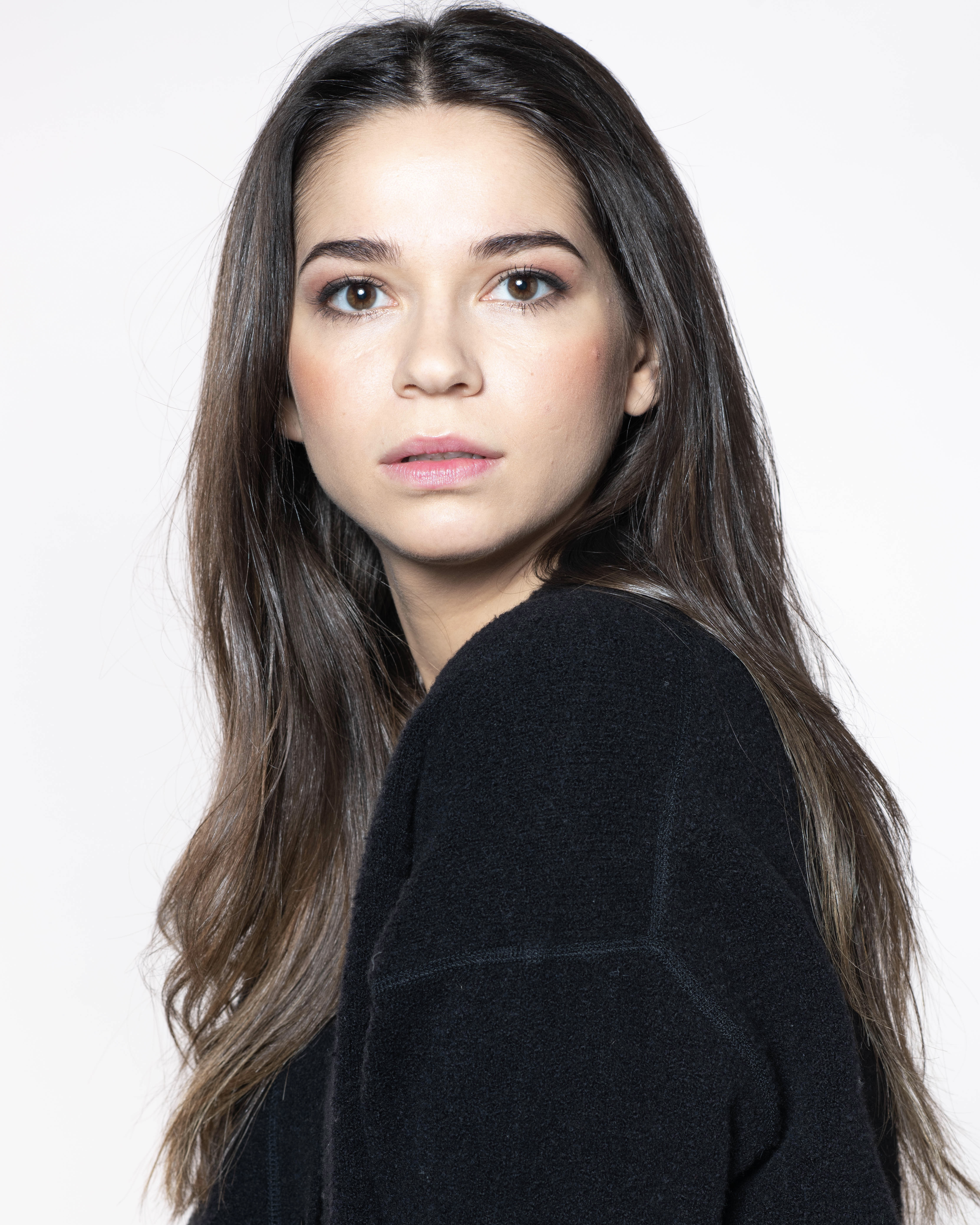
- Sawka in 2020
- Born: 15 December 1991 (age 34); Szczecin, Poland
- Education: Łódź Film School
- Occupation: Actress
- Years active: 2001 – present
- Spouse: Mateusz Rzeźniczak (m. 2024)

Karolina Sawka (Polish: [ka.rɔˈli.na ˈsav.ka]; born 15 December 1991) is a Polish stage and television actress.

== Biography ==
Karolina Sawka was born on 15 December 1991 in Szczecin, Poland. Her parents are illustrator and cartoonist Henryk Sawka, and makeup artist Ewa Sawka.

As a child, she portrayed Nel Rawlison, one of main characters in a 2001 adventure film In Desert and Wilderness. For her performance, she received several awards at the Giffoni Film Festival. In 2001, she was also awarded a title of the "Ambassador of Szczecin".

In 2015, Sawka debuted on stage of the Szwalnia Theatre in Łódź. She also performed in Iron Theatre in Katowice, and Contemporary Theatre in Szczecin. In 2017, Sawka acted in a student film Soyer, and in 2018, she graduated from the Łódź Film School. Additionally, she appeared in television series such as L for Love (2018–2019), First Love (2020), Father Matthew (2021), and Papiery na szczęście (2021).

== Private life ==
In 2024, she married actor Mateusz Rzeźniczak.

== Filmography ==
Year	Title	Role	Notes
2001	In Desert and Wilderness	Nel Rawlison	Feature film
2001	In Desert and Wilderness	Nel Rawlison	Miniseries; 3 episodes
2012	Miledzie	Waitress	Short film
2014	Hawk's Eye	Girl	Short film
2015	Kontrasty	Olga	Short film
2015	Chain Glass	Friend	Short film
2016	Zbliżenie	Mother in her youth	Short film
2017	Soyer	Tiger trainer	Feature film
2018–2019	L for Love	Kalina Marczewska	Television series; 22 episodes
2020	First Love	Magdalena Matuszewska	Television series; 60 episodes
2021	Father Matthew	Malwina Kopka	Television series; episode: "Chciwość" (no. 328)
2021	Papiery na szczęście	Bride	Television series; episode no. 27
