= Mathew Waters =

Australian actor (born 1989)

- Born: Matthew John Waters; 29 May 1989 (age 36); Kogarah, New South Wales, Australia
- Occupation: Actor
- Years active: 1998–present
- Notable work: Round the Twist, Snobs, The Pacific

Mathew John Waters (born 29 May 1989) is an Australian actor best known for his roles in Round the Twist, Snobs, The Pacific, Peter Pan and the original cast of the musical The Boy From Oz, where he played the roles of musician/entertainer Young Peter Allen.

== Career ==
Waters' acting career began at age eight when he was selected from more than 1,000 boys to play the role of young Peter Allen in the musical biopic The Boy From Oz. Waters' career went from strength to strength after landing starring roles in a number of Australian TV series with a worldwide cult following, namely as Bronson Twist in Round The Twist (series 3 & 4), as Scratch in The Escape of The Artful Dodger, and as Spike in Snobs.

Waters went on to star in a number of musicals such as Mame and The Artful Dodger in Oliver! "The Musical" before turning his hand to film. In 2003, he was invited to play a role in Peter Pan, after P. J. Hogan had seen him perform in Oliver!. Waters has subsequently appeared on TV in the United Kingdom and Germany, and he has gone on to appear in the HBO miniseries The Pacific and also a Canadian production Darwin's Brave New World. In December 2015, he played the Cowardly Lion in a pantomime production of The Wizard of Oz at the Shaw Theatre, London.

== Filmography ==
=== Film ===
Year	Title	Role	Notes
2003	Peter Pan	Messenger Boy	
2008	Men's Group	Darren	
TBA	Own Worst Enemy	Perry Chambers	

=== Television ===
Year	Title	Role	Notes
2000–2001	Round the Twist	Bronson Twist	26 episodes
2001	Escape of the Artful Dodger	Scratch	9 episodes
2003	Snobs	Spike	26 episodes
2006	Blue Water High	Troy	Episode #2.13
2009	Darwin's Brave New World	Syms Covington	3 episodes
2010	The Pacific	Weeping Marine	Episode: "Guadalcanal/Leckie"
2018	Doctor Doctor	Farmer	Episode: "When We Collide"
2018	Black Comedy	Guest Cast	Episode #3.1
2019	Fat Pizza: Back in Business	Premier's Assist	Episode #1.4
