= Kali (character) =

Kali is a character in the 1911 novel In Desert and Wilderness (Polish: W pustyni i w puszczy) by Polish writer Henryk Sienkiewicz. He is one of the earliest Polish literary depictions of a black person and has thus been cited as having shaped Polish perceptions of black people.

== Plot ==
Kali is the son of Mamba, a tribal chief of Wa-Hima, who later became the tribal chief and civilized his people. At first, he was kidnapped and sold through many places in Africa, until he meets a Polish boy, Staś Tarkowski, and an English girl named Nell Rawlinson, who are caught up in the rise of the Mahdist War in Sudan by the Arabs. Kali falls into the hands of Gebhr, one of the kidnappers of Staś and Nell, who treats Kali brutally as a slave. After Staś' liberation, the children end up travelling through the desert accompanied by two black people, Kali and a girl named Mea. They encounter a number of wonders and perils, from living in the forest to the war in Kali's homeland. During these adventures, Kali is described as "brave, creative and honourable", and later he becomes "a fair and successful leader of his people", through civilizing and Christianizing tribes around the Lake Rudolf region.

== Kali in Polish culture ==
Kali speaks broken English and many of his phrases have become frequently quoted, especially "Kali jeść, Kali pić" which means "Kali eat, Kali drink" (the lack of verb-subject agreement and conjugation being due to his lack of knowledge).

According to Time Magazine, 'Kali has been immortalized in the Polish language in the saying, “Kali’s morality,” which means “double standard"'. Kali says at one point: “If somebody takes Kali’s cow, it’s a bad deed. If Kali takes somebody’s cow, it’s a good deed.”
