= Stock Squad =

- Based on: an original idea by John Shaw; Brian Chirlian
- Written by: Hugh Stuckey
- Directed by: Howard Rubie
- Starring: Martin Sacks; Gerard Kennedy; Kris McQuade; Richard Meikle
- Country of origin: Australia
- Original language: English

Production
- Producer: Tom Jeffrey
- Cinematography: Ross Berryman
- Running time: 92 mins
- Production company: Independent Productions

Original release
- Network: Nine Network
- Release: 30 April 1986

Stock Squad is a 1985 Australian television film directed by Howard Rubie and starring Martin Sacks, Gerard Kennedy, Kris McQuade, and Richard Meikle. It focuses on the rural crime division. It aired on 30 April 1986, in Sydney.

== Premise ==
In the country town of Mirabee, huge quantities of grain go missing from a Government operated silo. The stock squad is called in to investigate.

== Cast ==
- Martin Sacks as Ric Santana
- Gerard Kennedy as Ken Ritchie
- Kris McQuade as Caroline Marshall
- Richard Meikle as McCabe
- Michael O'Neill as Andy Marshall
- Jay Hackett as McIntyre
- Carmen Duncan
- Tony Blackett
- Phillip Ross
- Brendon Lunney
- Su Cruickshank
- Jim Holt

== Reception ==
The Age called it "a thriller that doesn't thrill... as flat as the wheat country landscape."
