= In Desert and Wilderness (1973 film) =

- Directed by: Władysław Ślesicki
- Written by: Władysław Ślesicki, Henryk Sienkiewicz (novel)
- Produced by: Studio Filmowe (d. Zespół Filmowy) Iluzjon
- Cinematography: Bogusław Lambach
- Music by: Andrzej Korzyński
- Release date: 1973
- Running time: 193 minutes
- Country: Poland
- Language: Polish

In Desert and Wilderness (Polish: W pustyni i w puszczy) is a 1973 Polish film directed by Władysław Ślesicki. Adapted from the 1911 novel In Desert and Wilderness by Henryk Sienkiewicz, it tells the story of two kids, Staś Tarkowski and Nel Rawlison, kidnapped by the rebels during Mahdi's rebellion in Sudan.

The film is 193 minutes long and is composed of 2 parts which were shown separately in theaters. Work on it started in 1971. It was filmed in Egypt, Sudan and Bulgaria, with an international cast and crew. At the same time, a four-part miniseries was made. It is similar to the film but has some additional scenes as well as some altered scenes. Another adaptation was released in 2001.

The film remains to this day the second most-watched Polish film in cinemas in history with 31 million viewers seeing the film only in the period of the Polish People's Republic (until 1989).

== Cast ==
- Monika Rosca .... Nel Rawlison
- Tomasz Mędrzak .... Staś Tarkowski
- Emos Bango .... Kali
- Malia Mekki .... Mea
- Edmund Fetting .... George Rawlison (Nel's father)
- Stanisław Jasiukiewicz .... Władysław Tarkowski (Staś's father)
- Zygmunt Hobot .... Kaliopuli
- Zygmunt Maciejewski .... Linde
- Ahmed Hegazi .... Gebhr
- Ahmed Marei .... Chamis
- Ibrahim Shemi .... Idrys
- Abdel Menam Abu El Fatouh .... Mahdi
- Hosna Suleyman .... Dinah
- Abbas Fares
- Stefania Mędrzak .... Madame Olivier
- Fatma Helal .... Fatma
- Jerzy Kamas .... Tarkowski's voice (uncredited)
- Mohamed Hamdi, Bogumił Simeonow, Gawrił Gawriłow and others.
