= Pirates Island =

- Written by: Rick Maier
- Directed by: Viktor Ritelis
- Starring: Beth Buchanan; Brian Rooney; Les Hill; David Argue
- Country of origin: Australia
- Original language: English

Production
- Producer: Philip East
- Production company: Grundy Television
- Budget: $1 million

Original release
- Release: 1990

Pirates Island is a 1990 Australian film about a group of children who are swept away in a balloon to an island where pirates run amok.

== Cast ==
- Beth Buchanan as Sarah
- Brian Rooney as Jim
- Les Hill as Tony
- Matt Doran as Grommet
- David Argue as Snerdle
- Cornelia Frances as Captain Blackheart
- John Jarratt as The Jackel
- Roger Wand as Slavemaster
