= Tomasz Mędrzak =

Polish actor (born 1954)

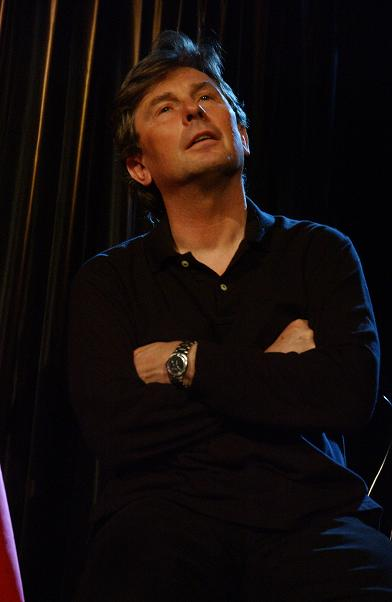
- Born: Tomasz Mędrzak; December 18, 1954 (age 71); Łódź, Poland
- Years active: 1973-1999

Tomasz Mędrzak (born December 18, 1954, in Łódź, Poland), was a teenage star of the 1973 In Desert and Wilderness movie and miniseries (1973), where he played Staś Tarkowski, having Monika Rosca as young partner. He is the son of Stefania Mędrzak.

He later did acting studies and has played a few movie roles. But he has always been focused rather on theatre. In 1996, he has been an art director of the Ochota Theater in Warsaw. He didn't really want to play Staś. He went to the auditions because he was interested in technical aspects of cinematography. Some time after being chosen, he wanted to decline, but the wife of the movie's director persuaded him to stay.

== Filmography ==
Year	Title	Role	Notes
1980-2000	Dom	Leszek Talar	Guest Star (2 episodes)
1993	Wow		Episode "Pechowy dzień"
1991	V.I.P.	Jan Ramus	Polish film
1988	And the Violins Stopped Playing	A Man	uncredited
1985	Lustro		made-for-television
1986	The Republic of Hope	Edward Wodniczak	Polish film
1985	Republika Ostrowska		Mini series
1985	Lustro		Not to be confused with the 1986 movie above.
1981	Przypadki Piotra S.		made-for-television
1980	Polonia restituta	A son of the doctor	Episode 1 (uncredited)
1980	Królowa Bona	Courtier	Episode #1.9
1979	A Long Way to Go	Piotr	Film
1973	In Desert and Wilderness	Staś Tarkowski	Miniseries
1973	In Desert and Wilderness	Staś Tarkowski	Movie
