= Ochota Theater =

Theater in Warsaw, Poland

- Teatr Ochoty
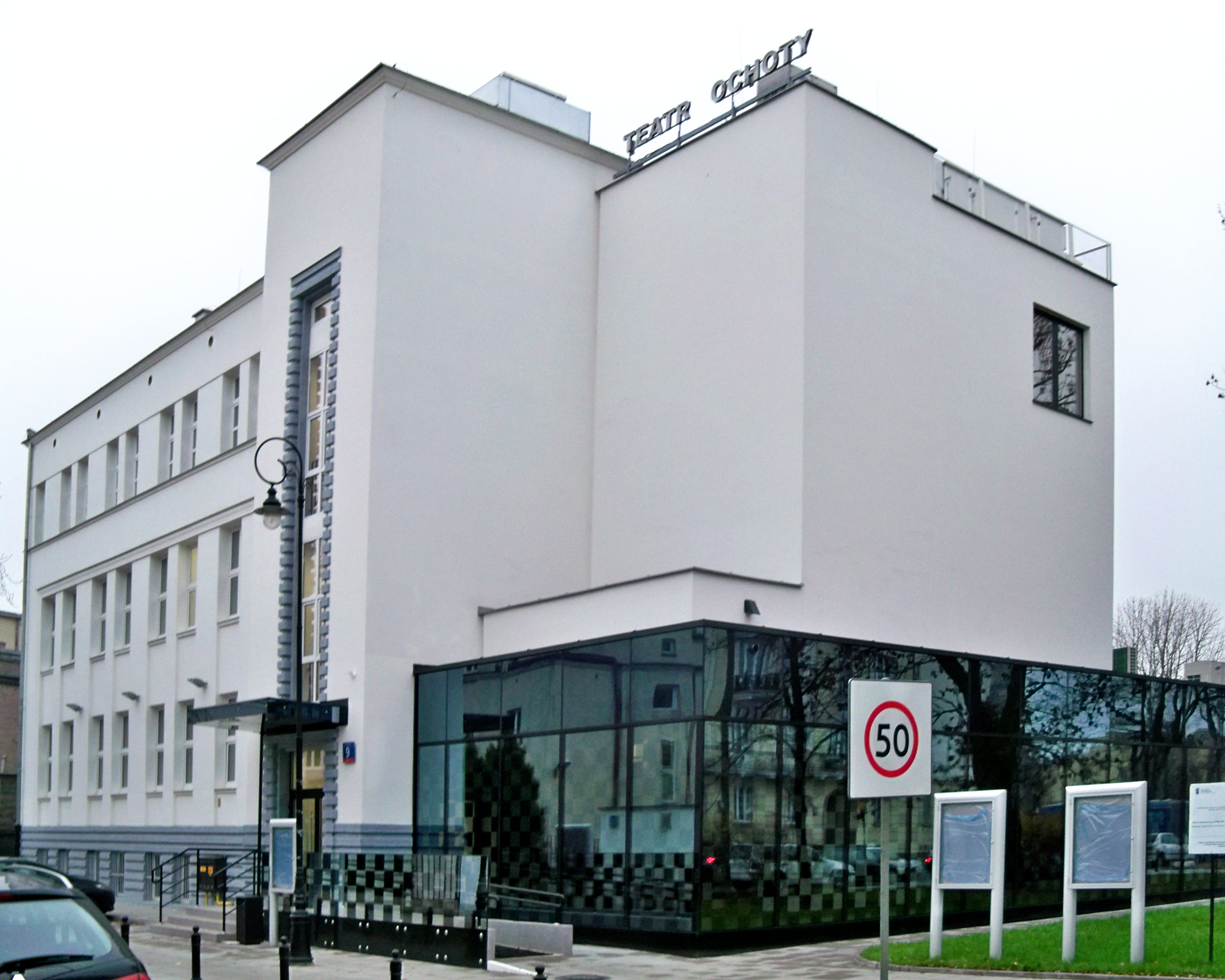
- Interactive map of Ochota Theater
- Address: ul. Reja 9 Warsaw; Poland
- Coordinates: 52.217164°N 20.989016°E

Construction
- Opened: October 22, 1970

Website
- https://teatrochoty.pl/

The Jan and Halina Machulski Ochota Theater (Polish: Teatr Ochoty im. Jana i Haliny Machulskich) is a performing arts theater in Kolonia Lubeckiego, Ochota, Warsaw. The auditorium has a seating capacity of less than 100.

== History ==
The theater was founded on October 22, 1970, by married couple Jan Machulski and Halina Machulska. Uciekła mi przepióreczka was the first performance played there. Jan Machulski was the director of the institution from its inception until 1996. Since 1976 the theater has staged Shakespeare's plays in Zamość, which gave rise to Zamość Theatre Summer.

Between 1996 and 2008, the theater was managed by Tomasz Mędrzak. In 2009, the city did not renew the contract with Mędrzak, leaving the theater without a director. In 2010, Joanna Nawrocka became the director.

On the theater's 50th anniversary in 2020, city councilors renamed the theater after Jan Machulski and Halina Machulska.

In 2022, the Warsaw Council of Seniors recognized the theater as a senior-friendly place.
