= Mission Top Secret =

- Genre: Action
- Created by: Roger Mirams
- Starring: Jennifer Hardy; Andrew Shepherd; Deanna Burgess; Frederick Parslow; Shane Briant; Lauren Hewett
- Country of origin: Australia
- Original language: English
- No. of seasons: 2
- No. of episodes: 48

Production
- Producer: Grundy Television Australia
- Running time: 30 minutes

Original release
- Network: Network Ten
- Release: 1992 – 1995

Mission Top Secret is an Australian action series aired between 1992 and 1995.

The pilot for the series was a 1991 telemovie of the same name. This was part of the South Pacific Adventure series on a budget of $1 million.

At the APRA Music Awards of 1994 won Best Television Theme.

== Premise ==
The series is about an organization known as the Centauri Network, a network of children from around the planet who fight crime and solve mysteries with the help of gadgets that were quite advanced for the time.

When twelve-year-old Jemma accidentally taps into a disused telecommunications satellite, she finds that she has audio-visual contact with other computers worldwide. With the help of electronics inventor Sir Joshua Cranberry she forms the Centauri Network, a worldwide crime-fighting organization of children. Jemma is the daughter of Sir Joshua's assistant. Their primary enemy was one persistent individual, Neville Savage, who is some sort of criminal mastermind. The inventor, Sir Joshua Cranberry, is the uncle of the Wiggins' twins, who are the primary protagonists in Season One.

As a curiosity, it can be observed that the names of the two protagonists match those of Prince Albert and Queen Victoria of England.

== Cast ==
=== Main / regular ===
- Rachel Friend as Annette (telemovie / pilot)
- Jennifer Hardy as Victoria Wiggins (season 1)
- Andrew Shephard as Albert Wiggins (season 1)
- Deanna Burgess as Jemma Snipe (season 1)
- Rossi Kotsis as Spike Baxter (seasons 1–2)
- Shane Briant as Neville Savage (seasons 1–2)
- Fred Parslow as Sir Joshua Cranberry (seasons 1–2)
- Emma Jane Fowler as Sandy Weston (seasons 1–2)
- Jamie Croft as David Fowler (season 2)
- Lauren Hewett as Kat Fowler (season 2)
- Beth Buchanan as Danielle
- Brian Rooney as Jim

=== Guests ===
- Alyssa-Jane Cook as Angel (1 episode)
- Jonathan Hardy as Bombalini (1 episode)
- Liz Burch as Mrs Fowler (4 episodes)
- Roy Billing as Superintendent Burke (3 episodes)

== Episodes ==
=== Series 1 ===
- The Falling Star (episodes 1.01 - 1.04)
- Eagles from the East (episodes 1.05 - 1.08)
- The Mona Lisa Mix-Up (episodes 1.09 - 1.12)
- The Treasure of Cala Figuera (episodes 1.13 - 1.16)
- The Polish Pony Puzzle (episodes 1.17 - 1.20)
- The Flight of the Golden Goose (episodes 1.21 - 1.24)

=== Series 2 ===
- The Crown Jewels Are Missing (episodes 2.01 - 2.04)
- The Return of the Dinosaur (episodes 2.05 - 2.08)
- The Golden Voice (episodes 2.09 - 2.12)
- The Treasure of Elephant Ridge (episodes 2.13 - 2.16)
- The Emperor's Pearl (episodes 2.17 - 2.20)
- The Toymaker (episodes 2.21 - 2.24)
