= Beth Buchanan =

Australian actress (born 1972)

- Born: Beth Christine Buchanan; 10 March 1972 (age 54); Sydney, New South Wales, Australia
- Occupations: Actress, social worker
- Years active: 1977–present
- Children: 3

Beth Christine Buchanan (born 10 March 1972) is an Australian actress and social worker. She is best known for the television roles as Gemma Ramsay in Neighbours, and Susan Croydon in Blue Heelers. She was also a long-standing member of the Ranters Theatre Company.

== Early life ==
Buchanan was born in Sydney, the daughter of musician Tony Buchanan (formerly of Crossfire) and teacher Jo Buchanan. She is the youngest of three children; her brother Miles and sister Simone are also actors.

== Career ==
Buchanan's television work includes appearances in Secret Valley, Runaway Island, Island Trader, Pirates Island, A Country Practice, Home and Away, Stingers, Hey Dad..! (where her older sister Simone starred as Debbie Kelly) and The Brittas Empire. Her longest-running part was the recurring role of Susan Croydon, the daughter of Tom Croydon, in the popular series Blue Heelers, which she played from 1994 to 2006. Major storylines included becoming a school teacher; attempting to take the blame when drugs were planted in her and Tom's home; and losing her baby as a result of a hit-and-run targeted at her father. Buchanan played Rita Heywood in both series of ABC1's journalism-orientated comedy Lowdown.

Film roles have included Newsfront, Fluteman, A Good Thing Going, Fortress (1986) – based on the Faraday School kidnapping – The Rogue Stallion and The King. Buchanan also played the title character in Peter Long's short A Telephone Call for Genevieve Snow (2000). Adapted from the story by Carmel Bird, it won the Silver Lion Award at the Venice Film Festival in 2000.

Buchanan has also worked alongside her former partner, Raimondo Cortese, performing in numerous stage plays he has written, both in Australia and internationally.

== Filmography ==
=== Television ===
Year	Title	Role	Notes
1980	Secret Valley	Beth	TV series, 9 episodes
1982-88	A Country Practice	Emma Stevenson / Fern Bowen / Becky Mason / Mrs Kafoops / Janis Burnett / Amanda Petersen	TV series, 10 episodes
1984	Five Mile Creek	Bessie	TV series, 1 episode
1984	Runaway Island	Nancy	TV miniseries
1987	The Flying Doctors	Julie Cleary	TV series, 1 episode
1987	The Haunted School	Vanessa	TV miniseries, 8 episodes
1988	Home and Away	Elyce Davis / Elyce Hart	TV series, 8 episodes
1989	Hey Dad..!	Elaine	TV series, 3 episodes
1990-91, 2019, 2022	Neighbours	Gemma Ramsay	TV series
1994	The Brittas Empire	Stephanie	TV series, season 4, episode 3
1994-2004	Blue Heelers	Susan Croydon	TV series, 15 episodes
1996	Halifax f.p.	Denise Crow	TV series, 1 episode
1999	Law of the Land	Danni Cairns	TV series, 1 episode
	Stingers		TV series
2010-12	Lowdown	Rita Heywood	TV series, seasons 1 & 2, 16 episodes
2014	This is Littleton	Daisy's Mother	TV series, 1 episode

=== Film ===
Year	Title	Role	Notes
1978	Newsfront		Feature film
1978	A Good Thing Going	Little girl in supermarket (uncredited)	TV movie
1982	Fluteman	Wendy	Feature film
1982	Island Trader	Joanne	TV movie
1983	Zero Zero	Child	TV movie
1985	Fortress	Leanne	Feature film
1986	Body Business	C	TV movie
1986	The Last Frontier	Zoe Hannon	TV movie
1988	Touch the Sun: Princess Kate	Benedicte	TV movie
1990	The Rogue Stallion	Anna Peterson	TV movie
1990	Pirates Island	Sarah	TV movie
1992	Mission Top Secret	Danielle	TV movie
1992	The Phantom Horseman	Charlotte	Feature film
2000	A Telephone Call for Genevieve Snow	Genevieve Snow	Short film
2002	The Hard Word	Nurse	Feature film
2003	The Situation Room		Short film
2007	The King	Val Wesley	TV movie
2006	The Tragedy of Hamlet Prince of Denmark	Ophelia	Film
2018	The Couple Enjoy a Bath		Short film

== Theatre ==
=== As actor ===
Year	Title	Role	Notes
1995	Death by Misadventure		La Mama, Melbourne
1995	Crimes of the Heart	Babe Borrelle	Universal Theatre, Melbourne, with HIT Productions
1996	The Large Breast or the Upside-Down Bell		La Mama, Melbourne, with Ranters Theatre
1997; 1999	Features of Blown Youth		The Economiser, Melbourne, Theater am Halleschen Ufer, Berlin, Performance Space, Sydney, with Ranters Theatre for Melbourne International Arts Festival
1998	Legacy		La Mama, Melbourne
2000–2003	Roulette Part 1 & 2		Price Theatre, Adelaide, PoNTI Festival Theatre, Portugal, Belvoir Street Theatre, Sydney, Chapel Off Chapel, Melbourne, Coimbra Festival Theatre, Portugal with Ranters Theatre
2001–2003	St Kilda Tales	Effie	Malthouse Theatre, Melbourne, Teatro Nacional San Joao, Portugal, Coimbra Festival Theatre, Portugal, Chapter Arts Centre, Cardiff, Aberystwyth Theatre, Wales, The Green Room, Manchester with Ranters Theatre
2003	God's Last Acre	Jojo	Malthouse Theatre, Melbourne, with Playbox Theatre Company
2003; 2008	The Wall		Horti Hall Gallery, Melbourne, Chapter Arts Centre, Cardiff, North Melbourne Town Hall with Ranters Theatre
2005	Roulette Part 3		The Butter Factory Theatre, Wodonga, Carlton Courthouse, Melbourne with Ranters Theatre
2007; 2009	Affection: Three Cities		Chapter Arts Centre, Cardiff, BlackBox, Melbourne with Ranters Theatre
2008	The Tragedy of Hamlet Prince of Denmark	Ophelia	Tower Theatre, Southbank, Melbourne with Poor Theatre & Malthouse Theatre
2010; 2011	Intimacy		Malthouse Theatre, Melbourne, Project Arts Centre, Dublin, New Ohio Theatre, New York, with Ranters Theatre
2014	I Know That I Am Not Dead		Arts House, North Melbourne for Festival of Live Art (FOLA)
2016	Come Away with Me to the End of the World		Malthouse Theatre, Melbourne
2017; 2020	Passenger		Melbourne Docklands, Sydney bus stop, Pirrama Rd, Pyrmont
2018	Unknown Neighbours		Theatre Works, Melbourne, with Ranters Theatre and Creative VaQi for Festival of Live Art (FOLA)

=== As writer ===
Year	Title	Role	Notes
2002	The Unicorn	Writer	Fitzroy Gallery, Melbourne
2007; 2009	Affection: Three Cities	Creator	Chapter Arts Centre, Cardiff, BlackBox, Melbourne with Ranters Theatre
2010; 2011	Intimacy	Devisor	Malthouse Theatre, Melbourne, Project Arts Centre, Dublin, New Ohio Theatre, New York, with Ranters Theatre
2016	Come Away with Me to the End of the World	Devisor	Malthouse Theatre, Melbourne

== Personal life ==
Buchanan has three sons (Cinto, born 2004; Cesare, born 2007; and Tancredi, born 2010) with her ex partner, playwright Raimondo Cortese. She is a social worker with a Master of Social Work (RMIT), has an Arts Diploma in Professional Writing and Editing (RMIT) and an Honours Degree in Performance Writing (Victoria University).
