= The Phantom Horseman (1990 film) =

- Written by: David Phillips
- Directed by: Howard Rubie
- Starring: Beth Buchanan; Brian Rooney
- Country of origin: Australia
- Original language: English

Production
- Producer: Philip East
- Production company: Grundy Television

Original release
- Release: 1990

The Phantom Horseman is a 1990 Australian television film about a mysterious masked horseman.

== Synopsis ==
The film portrays the adventure of a group of children who are whisked away to a strange island, and their encounters with pirates and a character known as The Phantom Horseman.

== Cast ==
- Beth Buchanan as Charlotte
- Brian Rooney as Toby
- Bryan Marshall as Tremaine
- James Coates as Longworth
- John Bonney as MacArthur
- Antoinette Byron as Arabella
- Michael Gow as Maul
- Marshall Napier as Captain Johnson
- Bill Conn as Marsden
- Martin Vaughan as Cross
- Ken Radley as Blake
- Marc Gray as Martin
