= Lungile Shongwe =

South African actress

- Born: 1983 (age 42–43); South Africa
- Occupation: Actress
- Notable work: In Desert and Wilderness

Lungile Shongwe (born 1983) is a South African film and theater actress. She is known for playing in a movie "In Desert and Wilderness" (2001) of a director Gavin Hood. In the film she starred alongside other South African actor, Mzwandile Ngubeni. In preparation for the role of Mea - just like Mzwandile Ngubeni - she had to learn Polish dialogues, although she did not know before the Polish language.

== Filmography ==
- 2001 In Desert and Wilderness - as Mea
- 2001 In Desert and Wilderness (TV mini-series) - as Mea
