= Craig Elliott =

American illustrator

- Born: July 13, 1971 (age 55)
- Area: artist

Craig Elliott (born July 13, 1971) is an American illustrator, visual development artist and layout artist who works in the animation industry. After graduating from the Art Center College of Design in Pasadena, California in 1996, he went on to work on numerous films for Disney Feature Animation, DreamWorks, Nickelodeon and Fox Animation Studios. Craig also exhibits his fine art illustrations and paintings at both Wondercon and Comic-Con International as well as occasionally teaching at the Art Center College of Design and Gnomon School of Visual Effects.

== Books and comics ==
Craig has painted comic book and cover artwork for Dark Horse Comics, appeared in various art periodicals such as Spectrum, Erotic Fantasy Art and The World's Greatest Erotic Art of Today as well as self-publishing his projects through the Aristata imprint.

In 2008, Craig was invited to contribute a piece to the Totoro Forest Project, a fundraising exhibition/auction to support the national trust Totoro Forest Foundation that was founded by Oscar Award winning filmmaker Hayao Miyazaki.

== Works ==
- Rise of the Argonauts (2008) (Video Game) (concept artist)

== Filmography ==
- Hercules (1997) (visual development artist)
- Mulan (1998) (key layout artist)
- The Emperor's New Groove (2000) (visual development artist)
- Treasure Planet (2002) (visual development artist/key assistant layout artist)
- Shark Tale (2004) (visual development artist)
- Father of the Pride (2004) (visual development artist)
- Home on the Range (2004) (key assistant layout artist)
- Chicken Little (2005) (visual development artist)
- Flushed Away (2006) (visual development artist)
- Bee Movie (2007) (visual development artist)
- Enchanted (2007) (layout artist)
- The Princess and the Frog (2009) (visual development artist)
- The Penguins of Madagascar (2009) (visual development artist)
- Rio (2011) (visual development artist)
- Hoodwinked 2: Hood vs. Evil (2011) (visual development artist)
- Puss in Boots (2011) (visual development artist)
- The Lorax (2012) (visual development artist)
- Monsters vs. Aliens (2013) (visual development artist)
- The Book of Life (2014) (visual development artist)
- Seventh Son (2014) (Concept artist)
- The SpongeBob Movie: Sponge Out of Water (2015) (visual development artist)
- Cars 3 (2017) (visual development artist)
- The Star (2017) (Production Designer)
- Strange world (2022) (visual development artist)
- Leo (2023) (Production Designer)
- Iwaju (2024) (visual development artist)
