= Mzwandile Ngubeni =

South African actor

- Born: 13 March 1982 (age 44); South Africa
- Occupation: Actor
- Years active: 1998 - present
- Spouse(s): Ntando Myeri, Nolwazi Ngubeni

Mzwandile Ngubeni (born 1982) is a South African film and theater actor. He is known for playing in a movie "In Desert and Wilderness" (2001) of a director Gavin Hood. In the film he starred alongside other South African actress, Lungile Shongwe. In preparation for the role of Kali - just like Lungile Shongwe - he had to learn Polish dialogues, although he did not know before the Polish language.

== Filmography ==
- 2001 Witness to a Kill - as Bellhop
- 2001 In Desert and Wilderness - as Kali
- 2001 In Desert and Wilderness (TV mini-series) - as Kali
- 2008 Jerusalema - as Young Bull
- 2009 Qudhmun Adeerkii - as a police officer Nageeye War
- 2010 MsX Bodyguards - as a friendly shopkeeper
- 2011 Waalane Weeji - as a foreigner
