= Ryszard Peryt =

Polish opera director, conductor, producer, and actor (1947–2019)

Ryszard Peryt (9 March 1947 – 23 January 2019) was a Polish opera director, conductor, producer and actor. He was also a librettist, having written the libretto for Zygmunt Krause's Balthazar.
