= Monika Rosca =

Polish former child actress and current pianist

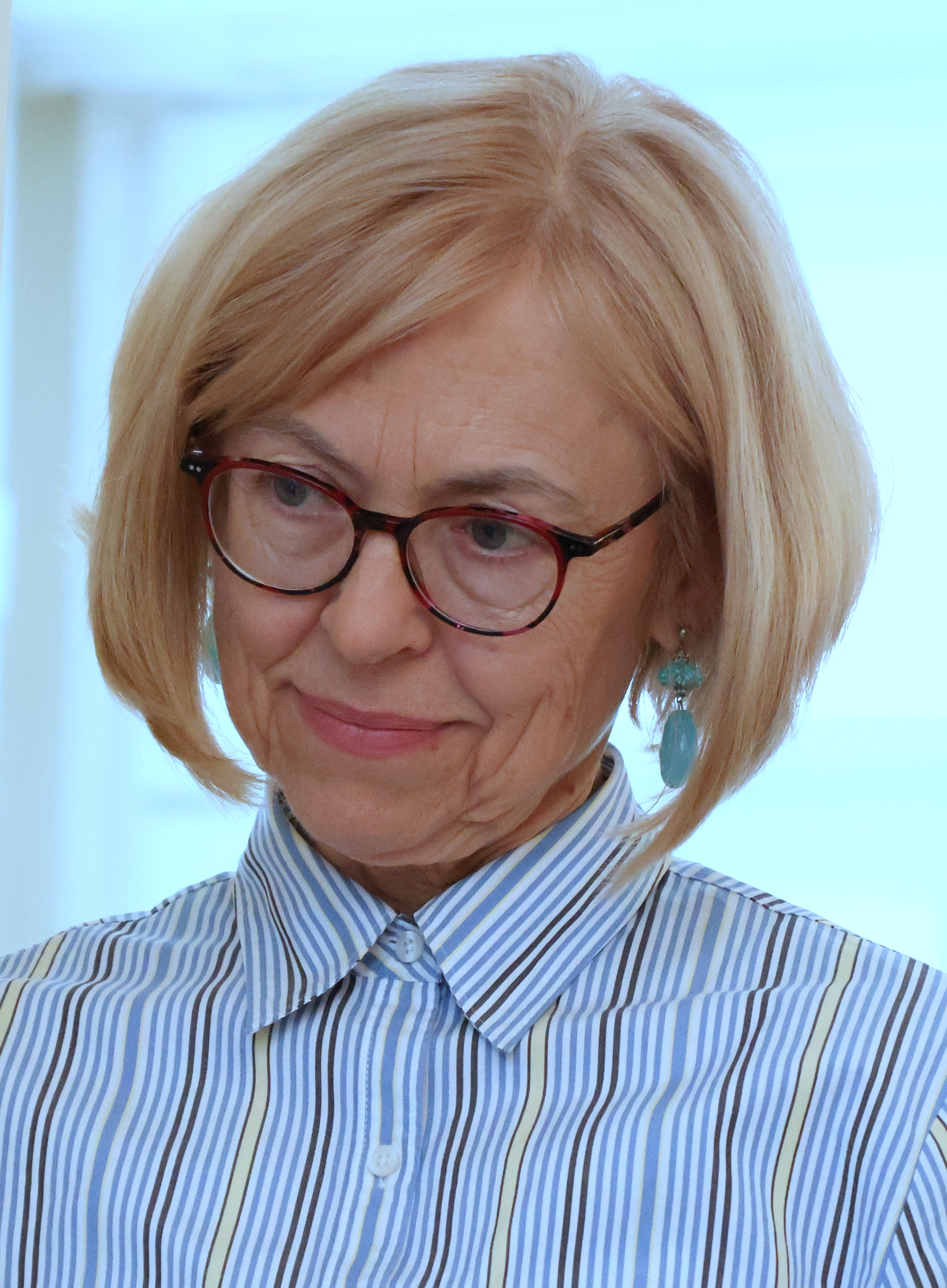
- Rosca in 2025
- Born: 4 May 1961 (age 65); Łódź, Poland

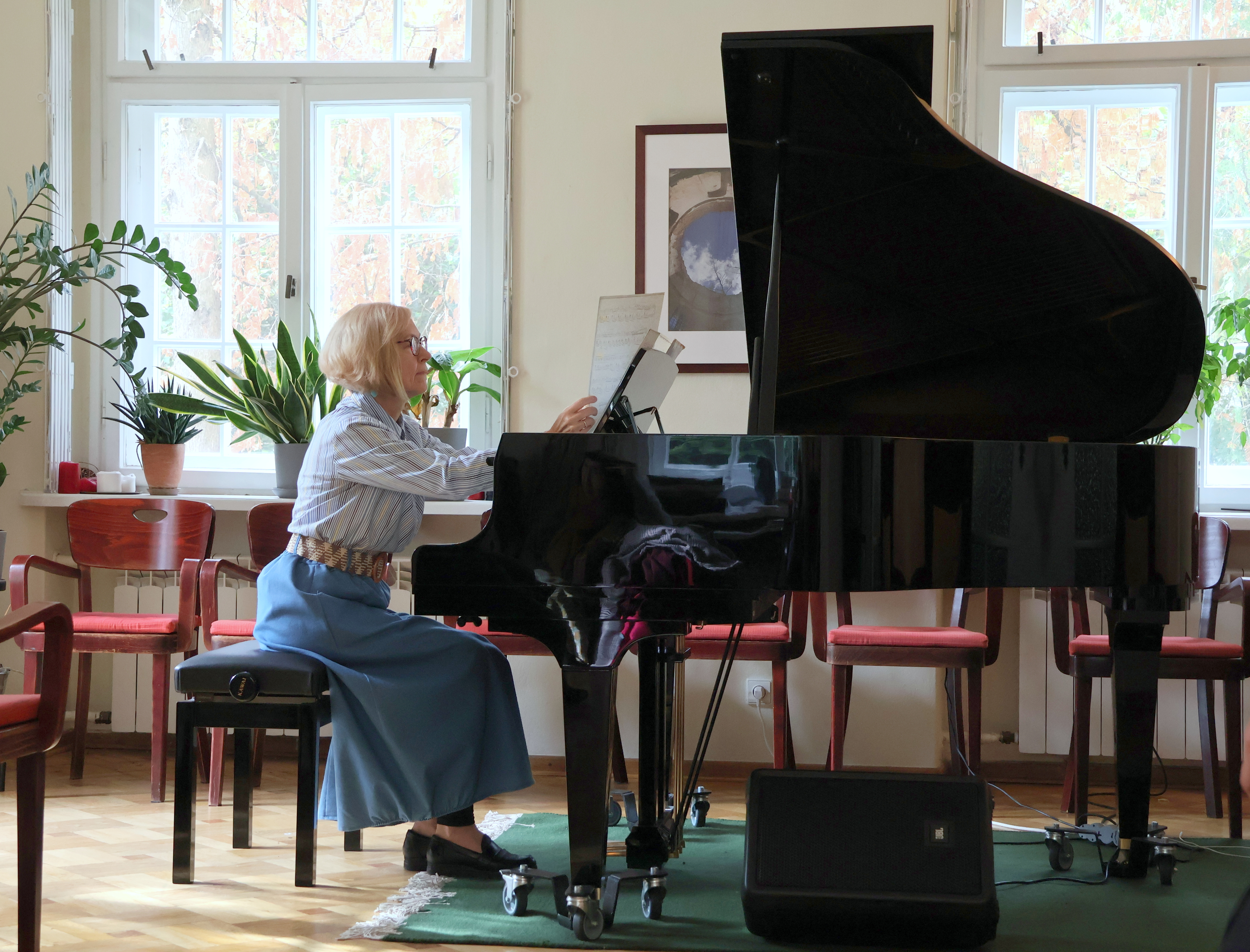
Rosca at the piano in 2025

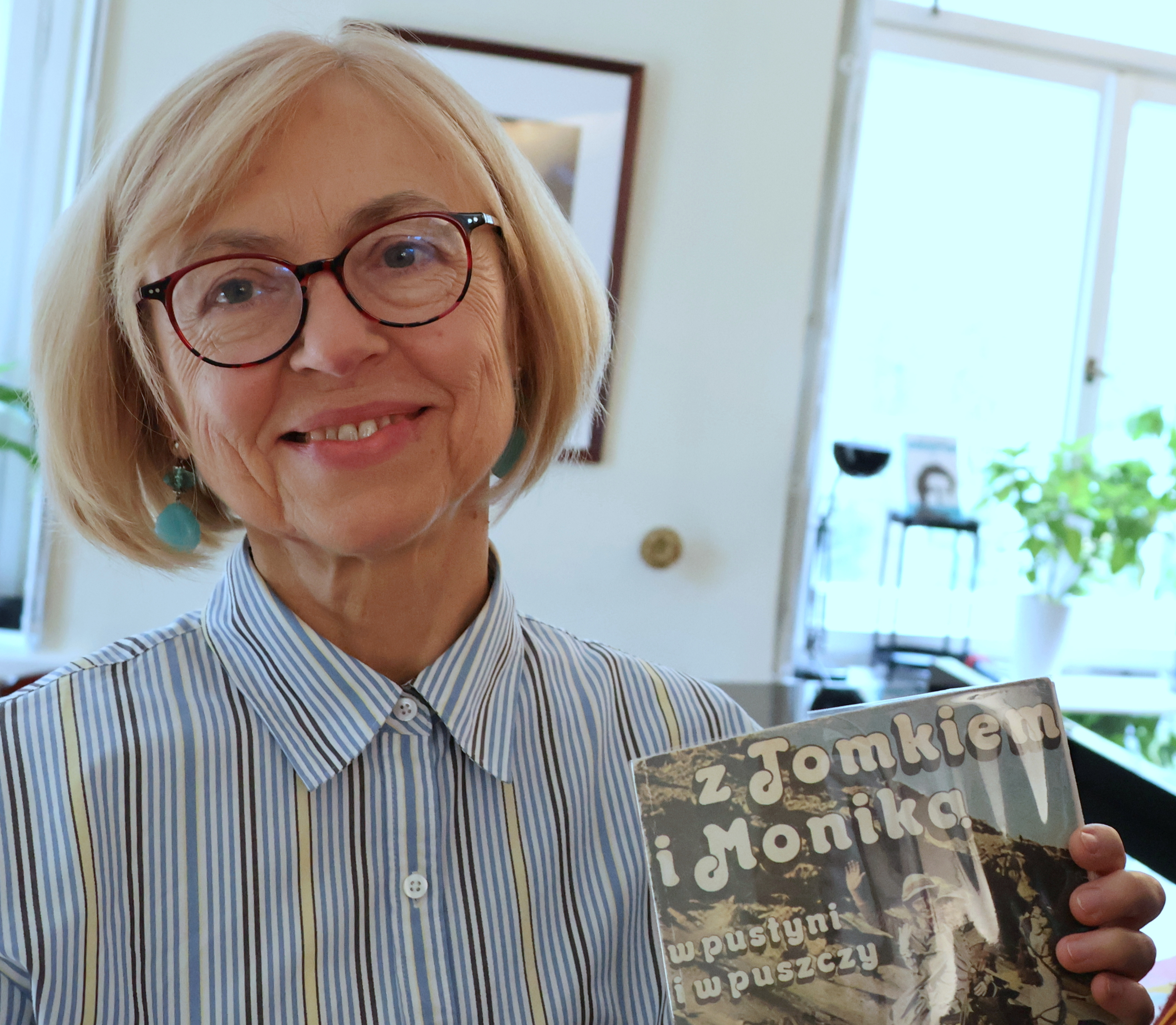
Rosca with a copy of Władysław Ślesicki’s book With Tomek and Monika in the Desert and Wilderness. Notes from the Film Set, published 1986 (2025)

Monika Rosca (born 4 May 1961) is a Polish former child actress and a current pianist. She appeared in two films: In Desert and Wilderness, which was produced as a movie (1973) and miniseries (1974), and a dubbed version of The Water Babies (1978), a British cartoon.

== Career ==
Rosca, who is half Romanian, was nine years old when she was cast in the role of Nel Rawlison in the film version of the adventure novel of Polish nineteen and early twenty century leading epic writer and 1905 literature Nobel Prize winner Henryk Sienkiewicz In Desert and Wilderness (1973), beating over 4,000 other girls to win the role. She was 12 when the movie completed filming. The movie was very popular, and remains ranked second in Poland by number of viewers. After completing filming, Rosca returned to elementary school, where she studied piano and flute. After finishing high school she attended the Warsaw and Łódź Academies of Music, twice being awarded the Fryderyk Chopin Society Scholarship. She received a master's degree in fine arts.

Rosca became an assistant professor, but left teaching to concentrate on a performance career. She has appeared in concert in Poland, Germany, United Kingdom, France, Romania, Russia, Korea, Indonesia and India.

She has won a number of international competitions, including the Rina Sala Gallo in Italy, Chamber Music and Karol Szymanowski Competitions in Łódź, 'Atheneum Piano Competition in Athens, Milosz Magin Piano Competition in Paris, and the Fryderyk Chopin International Competition in Poland. She frequently plays with the Fryderyk Chopin Society in Warsaw and Żelazowa Wola. In 1975, she received Czechoslovak magazine's Květy award.

== Current life ==
She remains in touch with Tomasz Mędrzak, her co-star from In Desert and Wilderness. They appeared together on Wojciech Jagielski's television talk show in 2000 when discussions were underway regarding a possible remake of the film.
