= In Desert and Wilderness (2001 film) =

2001 Polish film

- Movie poster
- Directed by: Gavin Hood
- Written by: Gavin Hood
- Based on: In Desert and Wilderness by Henryk Sienkiewicz
- Produced by: Waldemar Dziki, Włodzimierz Otulak
- Starring: Karolina Sawka; Adam Fidusiewicz; Mzwandile Ngubeni; Lungile Shongwe
- Cinematography: Jacek Januszyk
- Music by: Krzesimir Dębski
- Release date: 2001
- Running time: 111 minutes
- Country: Poland
- Language: Polish
- Budget: $4.2 million
- Box office: 2.2 million admissions (Poland)

In Desert and Wilderness (Polish: W pustyni i w puszczy) is a 2001 Polish film directed by Gavin Hood. Adapted from the 1911 novel In Desert and Wilderness by Henryk Sienkiewicz, it tells the story of two children, Staś Tarkowski and Nel Rawlison, kidnapped by the rebels during Mahdi's rebellion in Sudan.

== Production ==
Filming took three months. It was filmed in South Africa and Tunisia. The original director, Maciej Dutkiewicz, fell ill at the very beginning of filming and his role was taken by Hood. A miniseries version of the film was later broadcast in 2002. Its content differed from the book and the film was said to be more modern, notably in its depiction of intercultural relationships. The film enjoyed considerable success.

== Music ==
The soundtrack for the film was composed by Krzesimir Dębski. The theme song was Beata Kozidrak's 2000 song Rzeka marzeń (River of Dreams).

== Cast ==
- Karolina Sawka as Nel Rawlison
- Adam Fidusiewicz as Staś Tarkowski
- Artur Żmijewski as Władysław Tarkowski (Staś's father)
- Andrzej Strzelecki as George Rawlinson (Nel's father)
- Mzwandile Ngubeni as Kali
- Lungile Shongwe as Mea
- Konrad Imiela as Chamis
- Lotfi Dziri as Gebhr
- Ahmed Hafiane as Idrys
- Krzysztof Kowalewski as Kalioupoli
- Krzysztof Kolberger as Linde
- Agnieszka Pilaszewska as Madame Olivier
- Hichem Rostom as Mahdi

== Reception ==
With 2.2 million admissions, it was the second most popular Polish film of the year behind Quo Vadis.
