= In Desert and Wilderness =

1911 novel by Henryk Sienkiewicz

- 1912 Polish edition
- Author: Henryk Sienkiewicz
- Original title: W pustyni i w puszczy
- Language: Polish
- Genre: Young adult novel
- Publisher: Gebethner i Wolff
- Publication date: 1911
- Publication place: Poland
- English publication date: 1912

In Desert and Wilderness (Polish: W pustyni i w puszczy) is a popular young adult novel by the Polish author and Nobel Prize-winning novelist Henryk Sienkiewicz, written in 1911. The author's only novel written for children/teenagers, it tells the story of two young friends, Polish boy Staś Tarkowski and English girl Nell Rawlison, kidnapped by rebels during the Mahdist War in Sudan. It was adapted for film twice, in 1973 and in 2001.

== Plot ==
The story takes place in the late 19th century Egypt, during the Mahdist War. A 14-year-old Polish boy, Stanisław (Staś) Tarkowski, and 8-year-old English girl, Nell Rawlison, live with their fathers and grow up in the town of Port Said. Their fathers are engineers who supervise the maintenance of the Suez Canal. One day, the Mahdist War begins in Sudan, led by a Muslim preacher, the Mahdi. Staś and Nell are captured as hostages by a group of Arabs who hope that they can exchange the children for Fatma Smain, Mahdi's distant relative, who had been arrested by the British.

Nell and Staś are forced to travel through the Sahara Desert to Khartoum, where they are to be presented to Mahdi. The journey is difficult and exhausting, especially for delicate and vulnerable Nell. Staś, protects his friend from the abductors' cruelty, even though that means that he is beaten and punished. His plans to escape fail and the children gradually lose their hope, especially after the Fall of Khartoum and the death of General Gordon.

When the group arrive in Khartoum, the Arabs are disappointed by the fact that Mahdi, busy with leading the revolt, ignored their mission and turned down their offers. They take out their anger and frustration on the children.

Staś is summoned to meet with the Mahdi and turns down the rebel leader's offer to convert to Islam. For that he is strongly reprimanded by another European captive, a Greek who did agree to convert in order to save his family and himself. The Greek tells Staś that such a forced conversion does not count since "God sees what is inside your heart" and that, by his intransigence, Staś may have doomed Nell to terrible death.

Staś and Nell, exhausted by heat, thirst, hunger and poor treatment, live for some time in the city of Omdurman, ruined by war, poverty and diseases. After a while, the children and Arabs make another journey further south, to Fashoda. Dinah, Nell's servant, becomes infected by diseases at Omdurman, so she died on the way to Fashoda.

One day the group encounters a lion who attacks them. The Arabs (who do not know how to fire a shotgun) hand Staś' weapon to him and beg him to shoot the beast. Staś kills the lion, and then shoots down the Arabs as well. This is dictated by the despair and fury: the boy knows that the men were not going to set the children free and kill all of them.

Free of the Arabs, the children are marooned in the depth of Africa. They set out on an arduous journey through the African desert and jungle in the hope that sooner or later they would encounter European explorers or the British Army. The journey is full of dangers and adventures. The children, accompanied by two black slaves (a boy named Kali and a girl named Mea) whom Staś had freed from the Arabs, encounter a number of wonders and perils, including the worst night to the treehouse "Cracow".

Soon Nell is stricken with malaria and is about to die. Staś, mad with grief, decides to go to what he thinks is a Bedouin camp and beg for quinine. When he gets to the camp, he finds out that it belongs to an old Swiss explorer named Linde. The man had been severely injured by a wild boar and is waiting for death. All of his African servants, offered by the King of Uganda, have fallen ill to sleeping sickness (except Nasibu), in which Staś baptized followed Linde's words. Staś becomes friend with Linde who generously supplies him with food, weapon, gunpowder and a lot of quinine, and told him that his plan to Abyssinia is too risky and the best way to escape is to the Indian Ocean. Thanks to the medicine, Nell recovers. A few days later, Linde died and the African servants died one by one.

Following Linde's words, the group went on a mountain called Mount Linde with a height of 1500m from sea level. They stayed there for a time and during their stay, Nell recovered fully from malaria, Staś and Nell converted and baptized Kali, Mea and Nasibu into Christians, and the children started making kites to transfer the rescue message, hoping one will fall into European hands or their father.

The group moves on to the villages. The tribespeople, seeing Staś riding upon an elephant, honor him and Nell as a Good Mzimu (a good spirit/goddess). The group stays in some villages a short time, for Kali is by birthright the prince of the Wa-Hima tribe and therefore well-known.

On reaching Kali's home village, the group learns that his tribe has been invaded by and attacked by the Samburu tribes since time immemorial, and his dad is defending a fort and will devastate if not rescued. Due to assistance from Kali's tribe and the guns carried by Staś and Nell, the war is won in the protagonist's favour. Because of his good nature, Staś and Nell command that the tribespeople of the Samburu tribe not be killed but rather united with the Wa-Hima.

Staś, Nell, Saba, King, Kali and 100 Samburu and Wa-Hima tribespeople, equipped and trained with guns, move on to the east, which has not been mapped, in hope of reaching the Indian Ocean and being found by English explorers who might be searching for them. Kali has brought with him two witch doctors, M'Kunje and M'Pua, fearing that they might plot against him while he is away from home. However, it ends tragically for the group: both of the witch doctors steal their food and the last of their water and tried to escape, but died doing so.

Many of the tribespeople accompanying Nell and Staś die from lack of water, some leave the group. After the group has gone for at least three days without any water in the scorching dry desert, the children are saved at the last moment by two familiar officers who had recovered kites inscribed by Staś and Nell earlier in their plight describing their whereabouts and destination. Staś, Nell and Saba are reunited with their fathers and Nell returns to England. Kali and his tribe members return to their home village on Lake Rudolf and start the Christianization and civilization of their tribes. 10 years later, after graduating university and getting a job in Switzerland, Staś travels to England where he marries Nell. One year later, George Rawlinson passes away, and Staś and Nell revisit their journey in the past but in more convenient circumstances, as the Mahdi were defeated. They visit King, which was under the care of the local British authorities and had heard about the success of the missionary work and civilization of Kali. Finally, the couple return to Poland and live there with Staś' father.

== Characters ==
- Nell Rawlison – 8-year-old English girl. She is very pretty and sweet. Although at the beginning of the novel she seems to be timid and shy, later she shows that she can be courageous and stubborn. She treats Staś with trust, respect and obedience, and often looks up to him.
- Stanisław Tarkowski (dim. Staś) – a 14-year-old Polish boy. At the beginning of the novel, he seems to be a little bit scornful and bigheaded. However, as the story develops, it is revealed that Staś is extremely chivalrous and willing to sacrifice his own life to save Nell whom he loves like his own sister.
- Kali – African boy from Wa-hima tribe, son of King Mamba, once a slave of Gebhr but was liberated and became Staś's servant who quickly becomes his friend. He faithfully serves his master and helps him to go through the dangers of Africa. And later became the king of the Wa-Hima and Christianized and civilized the tribes around Lake Rudolf region. Kali became popular when a Polish colloquial saying about double standards was coined around the so-called "Kali's morality" (moralność Kalego): "If somebody takes Kali's cow, it's a bad deed. If Kali takes somebody's cow, it's a good deed."
- Mea – African girl from the Dinka tribe, Nell's servant. Shy and quiet, she loves her little mistress and protects her from dangers.
- Władysław Tarkowski - Staś's father, veteran of the January Uprising, an engineer working in the Suez Canal Company. Married a Frenchwoman, who died giving birth to Staś.
- George Rawlison – Nell's widowed father, a director of the Suez Canal Company.
- Dinah - Nell's servant. She died on the way to Fashoda because of diseases at Omdurman.
- Chamis – son of Chagidi, one of the kidnappers. Earlier a servant of Staś and Nell's fathers but lied about their dads' locations to kidnap the children.
- Idris – a Bedouin, one of the Mahdi's followers. Relatively well-behaved towards the children, he admired Staś's courage. He was tasked with bringing the children safely to the Mahdi and Smain.
- Gebhr – the cruel younger brother of Idris.
- Mrs. Oliver – Nell's teacher, a Frenchwoman.
- Linde – Swiss explorer, encountered by Staś.
- Smain – husband of Fatma, relative of the Mahdi.
- Caliopuli – Greek worker who survived and was employed by the Mahdi.
- Nasibu – servant of Linde, after his death, he joined the children on their further journeys.
- Faru – leader of the Samburus, the tribe that once opposed Kali's tribe.
- M'Kunje and M'Pua – witch doctors of Wa-Hima, hostile to Kali after their "evil Mzimu" tool was found.
- M'Rua - King of the village where Staś and Kali firstly introduced Nell as "good Mzimu".
- Doctor Clary – relative of Nell, whose sister married Nell's relative in Bombay.
- Captain Glenn – encountered by Staś and Nell in the train, later saved them in an expedition incidentally.
- Fatma Smain – a relative of the Mahdi. Her detention was the reason for the abduction of Staś and Nell.

== Reception ==
The book enjoyed immense popularity among readers upon its publication in 1911 and was translated into 21 languages becoming an international best-seller. Wojciech Zembaty writes that the book "uses classic patterns of the adventure novel genre" and observes that "thanks to willpower, endurance and creativity [...] the travellers and castaways of these novels manage to survive in a hostile environment" citing Daniel Dafoe's Robinson Crusoe (1719) and Jules Verne's The Mysterious Island (1874) as examples. He argues that after a century, the book is still a good read, the characters being simple but well-drawn. Staś, one of the main protagonists, has to confront his own self-image in the face of actual challenges and dangers as he tries to protect little Nel. He praised the book for plenty of dramatic, thrilling and epic moments.

In the 21st century, In Desert and Wilderness has come under increasing criticism for its depiction of Black people and European colonialism. In 2001, Polish literary critic Ludwik Stomma described the book as "uncritical apologia of 19th-century colonialism", and argued that the European characters in the book are presented as multifaceted and complex in nature in comparison to Sienkiewicz's often one-dimensional depiction of non-European characters. Stomma noted that Sienkiewicz portrayed Africans as being primitive despite the fact that prior to his visit to Africa in 1891, numerous ethnological works on Africa, its culture and religious beliefs had already been published and would have been available to him. Furthermore, Stomma criticized how Sienkiewicz depicted the Mahdi in a uniformly negative light and ignored misdeeds committed by British forces in their war against him.

However, according to Zembaty the issue of racial stereotyping in the book is not so obvious. He counters the argument about the novel's allegedly racist depiction of African characters by showing the example of the young prince Kali, liberated from slavery, who is "brave, creative and honourable". Kali saves the kids on a couple of occasions and stays with them in difficult moments, risking his own life. He later becomes a fair and successful leader of his people. In 2017, Afro-Polish activist James Omolo wrote that In Desert and Wilderness "helped perpetuate existing racist stereotypes".

According to sociologist Maciej Gdula, In Desert and Wilderness promotes a sense of superiority over the people of other races and shows how to celebrate one's own culture, while at the same time disregarding the other and alien cultures. However, just like other works by writers from this period including Joseph Conrad, Rudyard Kipling or H. Rider Haggard, who were met with similar criticisms, the book can also be seen as a product of the era in which Sienkiewicz lived and his views on Africa could be seen as a sort of historical testimony, a monument from the times, when Europe was narcissistic and saw themselves as superior, compared to the rest of the world, in terms of material and scientific progress. In 1990, the book was included on the list of obligatory reading for the fifth grade in Polish schools by the Ministry of National Education.

== Film adaptations ==
The first movie version was directed by Władysław Ślesicki in 1973. It lasts about three hours and is composed of two parts which were shown separately in theaters. Work on it started in 1971 and it was released in 1973. The movie was filmed in Egypt, Sudan and Bulgaria, with an international cast and crew. A mini-series was created at the same time. This version was shown in the U.S. on HBO in fall 1975.

The 2001 version was directed by Gavin Hood in only about three months. It was filmed in South Africa, Tunisia and Namibia. The original director fell ill at the very beginning of filming and his role was taken by Hood. A mini-series was made at the same time.

== Follow-up stories by other authors ==
- In 1961, a Polish writer and screenwriter Marian Brandys published Śladami Stasia i Nel (Following the Path of Staś and Nel) and, in 1962 a related story, Z Panem Biegankiem w Abisynii (In Abyssinia with Mister Bieganek).
- Władysław Ślesicki, the director of the 1973 movie, released a book about making the movie, Z Tomkiem i Moniką w pustyni i w puszczy (In Desert and Wilderness with Tomek and Monika).
- In 1993, Wojciech Sambory (a pen name for a writing team) wrote Powrót do Afryki (A Return to Africa), as a sequel to the novel (published by Reporter-Oficyna Wydawnicza, ISBN 83-85189-54-8).
- In 2014, Leszek Talko published a book Staś i Nel. Zaginiony klejnot Indii (Staś and Nel: The Lost Jewel of India), which takes place two years after the events of the original novel.

== See also ==
- Mahdist Sudan
- The Tragedy of the Korosko (novel with a similar theme)
- Postcolonialism
- Imperialism
- Polish literature
- Bildungsroman
