= Speaking truth to power =

Non-violent political tactic employed by dissidents

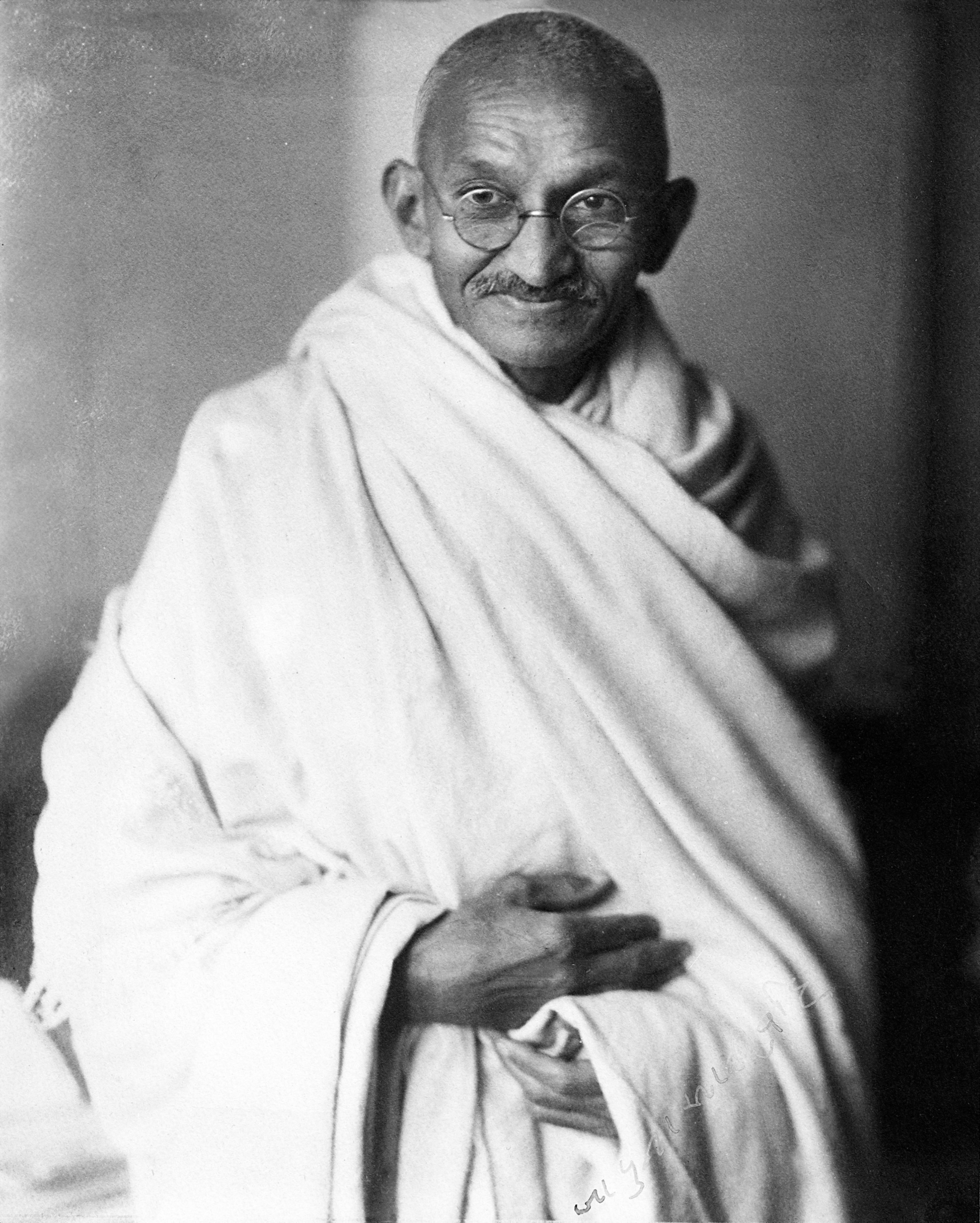
Mahatma Gandhi spoke truth to power using non-violent tactics

Speaking truth to power refers to the act of speaking out against an entity, such as a government, that an individual regards as oppressive or authoritarian. The phrase originated with a pamphlet, Speak Truth to Power: a Quaker Search for an Alternative to Violence, published by the American Friends Service Committee in 1955. Speak Truth To Power is also the title of a global human rights initiative under the auspices of Robert F. Kennedy Human Rights. Practitioners who have campaigned for a more just and truthful world have included Apollonius of Tyana, Vaclav Havel, Nelson Mandela, Archbishop Desmond Tutu, Mahatma Gandhi, Bacha Khan, and the Dalai Lama.

== History of the concept ==
Historian Clayborne Carson attributes the popularizing of the phrase in America to civil rights organizer and peace activist Bayard Rustin, and said that he adapted it in the early 1940s from a saying of Muhammad. Rustin adapted and condensed this concept as part of co-writing the pamphlet Speak Truth to Power: a Quaker Search for an Alternative to Violence which was published in 1955.

In 1970, Albert O. Hirschman wrote that subordinates have three options: Exit, Voice, and Loyalty. However, according to Michel Foucault, only the courageous may pursue the truth-to-power course, as they risk losing their friends (as Winston Churchill did in the 1930s), their liberty, even their lives (as Liu Xiaobo did).

Noam Chomsky is dismissive of "speaking truth to power". He asserts: "power knows the truth already, and is busy concealing it". It is the oppressed who need to hear the truth, not the oppressors. Chomsky's belief that we must speak 'truth to the powerless' inspired a six-part docuseries on Canadian foreign policy of the same name, released in 2022, in which he also took part.

== Examples ==
Alexander Solzhenitsyn and Andrei Sakharov are among those who suffered for speaking out against the USSR. In 1936, Japanese finance minister Takahashi Korekiyo was assassinated after suggesting that Japan could not afford its planned military buildup. Dietrich Bonhoeffer in Nazi Germany, and Martin Luther King Jr. in the US, were people who lost their lives for speaking truth to power.

Ex-GCHQ employee Katharine Gun was charged under the UK Official Secrets Act 1989 with leaking a request by the United States for compromising intelligence on United Nations delegates prior to the Iraq invasion of 2003. Together with Daniel Ellsberg, Coleen Rowley and Sibel Edmonds, she set up the Truth-telling Coalition to encourage more of their former colleagues to 'tell truth to power'.

== In education ==
The reverend Nick Mercer, an assistant chaplain at Sherborne School, believes that human rights and morality should be taught in all schools. Mercer, who gave evidence on mistreatment of detainees in Iraq, once served as a military lawyer.

According to Vaclav Havel, politics should not be ignored because it attracts bad people. It follows that politics requires people of exceptional purity, higher sensitivity, taste, tact and responsibility. "Those who say that politics is disreputable help make it so... Those who claim that politics is a dirty business are lying to us."

Michel Foucault spoke and wrote about power and oppression by examining how "technologies of power and knowledge have, since antiquity, intertwined and developed in concrete and historical frameworks".

Paulo Freire in his seminal work Pedagogy of the Oppressed explains how "oppression has been justified and how it is reproduced through a mutual process between the "oppressor" and the "oppressed" (oppressors–oppressed distinction). Freire admits that the powerless in society can be frightened of freedom. He writes, "Freedom is acquired by conquest, not by gift. It must be pursued constantly and responsibly. Freedom is not an ideal located outside of man; nor is it an idea which becomes myth. It is rather the indispensable condition for the quest for human completion". According to Freire, freedom will be the result of praxis—informed action—when a balance between theory and practice is achieved".

== In popular culture ==
=== Books ===
Anita Hill's book Speaking Truth to Power (1998), is a candid autobiography in which Hill reflects on her experience of testifying at the 1991 Clarence Thomas Supreme Court nomination hearings, gives details on her earlier professional relationship with Clarence Thomas, and explains her motivation for going public with her sexual harassment accusations against Thomas.

Kerry Kennedy's book Speak Truth To Power: Human Rights Defenders Who Are Changing Our World (1st edition 2000), with photographs by Eddie Adams, features interviews with dedicated human rights campaigners including: José Ramos-Horta from East Timor, Dianna Ortiz of Guatemala, Baltasar Garzón of Spain and Desmond Tutu of South Africa.

=== Films ===
The story of Sophie Scholl and the White Rose non-violent, intellectual resistance group in the Third Reich has been filmed four times, including Die Weiße Rose (1982), and Sophie Scholl: The Final Days (2005).

Richard Attenborough's film Gandhi (1982) was a worldwide success, despite one Hollywood mogul's opinion that the central character was a "little brown man in a sheet whom nobody wants to see."

More recent films exemplifying speaking truth to power include the biopic Snowden (2016), about the whistleblower Edward Snowden, and Official Secrets (2019), about the story of Katharine Gun.

=== Television ===
The phrase "truth to power" is often used in the HBO series The Wire. For example, for a reality check, politician Tommy Carcetti frequently asks his trusted advisor Norman Wilson to speak "truth to power" (e.g., in season 5, episode 1).

== See also ==
- Exposé
- Nonviolent revolution
- Power politics
- Whistleblower
