= Ben Emmerson =

British lawyer (born 1963)

Ben Emmerson CBE KC
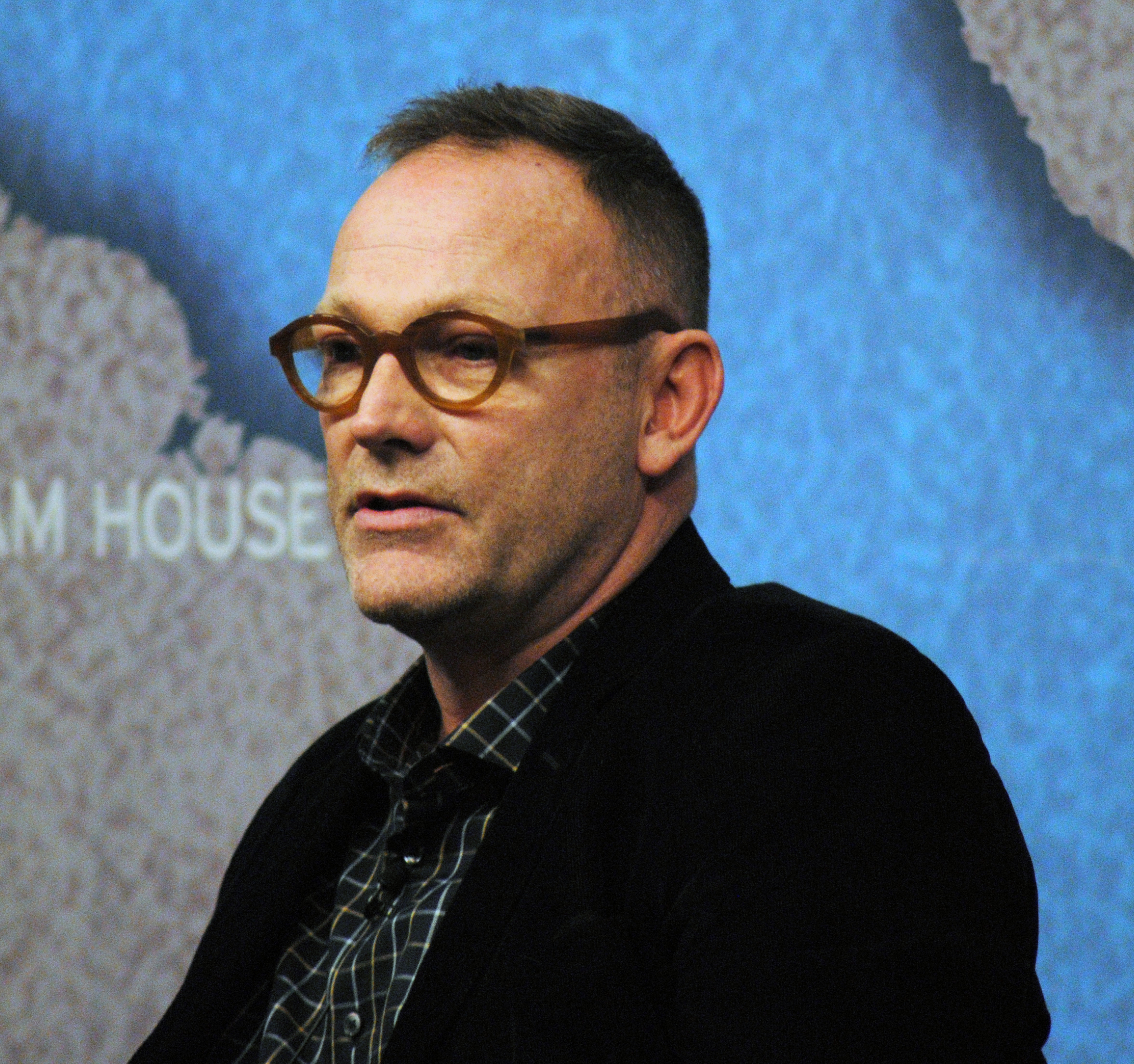
- Emmerson at Chatham House in 2013

United Nations Special Rapporteur on Counter Terrorism and Human Rights
- In office 2011–2017
- Preceded by: Martin Scheinin
- Succeeded by: Fionnuala Ní Aoláin

Personal details
- Born: 30 August 1963 (age 62) Kent, England
- Occupation: Barrister

Michael Benedict Emmerson CBE KC (born 30 August 1963) is a British barrister, specialising in public international law, human rights and humanitarian law, and international criminal law. From 2011 to 2017, he was the UN Special Rapporteur on Human Rights and Counter-Terrorism. Emmerson is currently an Appeals Chamber Judge of the UN Mechanism for International Criminal Tribunals sitting on the Criminal Tribunals for the Former Yugoslavia and Rwanda. He has previously served as Special Adviser to the Prosecutor of the International Criminal Court, and Special Adviser to the Appeals Chamber of the ECCC (the UN-backed Khmer Rouge Tribunal in Cambodia).

In his legal practice, Emmerson has acted for a number of foreign Governments in connection with international armed conflicts, including the Governments of Croatia, Cyprus, Georgia and Ukraine. He has also represented several current and former heads of State and other political figures, including Mohammed Nasheed (former President of the Maldives); Ramush Haradinaj (former Prime Minister of Kosovo); Arseny Yatsenuk (former Prime Minister of Ukraine); and Carles Puigdemont (ex President of Catalonia). He has appeared in numerous cases in the European Court of Human Rights, acting for and against the Government of the United Kingdom and other Council of Europe Member States, and has appeared in the International Court of Justice, the International Criminal Court and other international courts and tribunals.

Emmerson's former clients include WikiLeaks founder Julian Assange (in connection with an attempt to extradite him to Sweden); GCHQ whistleblower Katharine Gun (who was prosecuted under the UK's Official Secrets Acts following the 2003 invasion of Iraq); and Marina Litvinenko (the wife of former Russian FSB officer Alexander Litvinenko, who was assassinated in London in 2006 using the radioactive isotope Polonium 210). Emmerson also represented Abdelbasset al-Megrahi (the Libyan intelligence officer convicted of the Lockerbie bombing) in his appeal against conviction in Scotland, and subsequently acted for Abdullah Al-Senussi, the former head of national security to Colonel Gaddafi, in proceedings before the International Criminal Court.

Within the UK, Emmerson has been a deputy High Court judge, a master of the Bench of the Middle Temple, a visiting professor of international law and security at the University of Oxford, and an Honorary Fellow of Mansfield College, Oxford. In 2016, he was awarded an honorary PhD from Bristol University.

In 2023, he represented Nicolás Maduro's government during Venezuela's appeal of the International Criminal Court investigation in Venezuela.

== Early life, education and early career ==
Born in Kent, his father Brian Emmerson was finance director of the Stock Exchange in London. He attended Douai School and Bristol University, and was called to the bar in 1986. Until 1999 Emmerson was a member of Doughty Street Chambers, but in February 2000 he left to join the new Matrix Chambers which specialises in human rights. In May 2000 he was appointed Queen's Counsel. In January 2019, he moved to Monckton Chambers. Ben Emmerson left Monckton Chambers in 2020.

== International appointments ==
In June 2011, Emmerson was elected by the UN Human Rights Council as UN Special Rapporteur on Counter Terrorism and Human Rights. He held this mandate until July 2017. In this capacity he reported annually to the UN General Assembly, the UN Human Rights Council and relevant entities established by the Security Council. He also conducted country visits and reports, and provided technical and other advice to states. He produced reports on the counter-terrorism policies of Saudi Arabia, Chile, Sri Lanka, Tunisia and Burkina Faso. His first thematic report, published in 2012, concerned the human rights of victims of terrorism. The report was welcomed by Amnesty International. He also produced reports on the use of armed drones for counter-terrorism operations in Pakistan, Afghanistan and Palestine, accountability for the torture of terrorist suspects, human rights violations committed by ISIS in Iraq and Syria, electronic surveillance, terrorism and migration, the impact of national security measures on civil society, and the UN's counter-terrorism sanctions regime.

Emmerson is currently the British judge on the UN Mechanism of the International Criminal Tribunal for Rwanda and the International Criminal Tribunal for the Former Yugoslavia. He has previously acted as Special Adviser to the Prosecutor at the International Criminal Court and Special Adviser to the international judges of the UN backed Khmer Rouge Tribunal in Cambodia.

== Notable cases ==
In 1998, Emmerson successfully represented the claimants in the groundbreaking case of Osman v United Kingdom, a seminal decision of the European Court of Human Rights that first established the principle that a State owes a positive obligation to protect the right to life under Article 2 of the European Convention on Human Rights from the criminal acts of a private individual. The case concerned the fatal shooting of a man in London by a teacher who had become obsessed with the victim's son. It was alleged that the police had failed to heed multiple warning signs, or take necessary action to prevent the murder, and that the British courts had failed to provide an effective remedy for the police negligence. The Court held that the United Kingdom had violated the victims’ rights to a fair hearing through the grant of an effective legal immunity to the police, shielding them from legal liability in the tort of negligence, and awarded damages for the breach.

The following year, he successfully challenged the UK government's ban on homosexuals serving in the military, when he represented two homosexual members of British armed forces at the European Court of Human Rights. The UK government was ordered to pay compensation and subsequently reversed its policy.

In 2003, Emmerson represented Islamist cleric Abu Qatada, accused of being a member of Al-Qaeda, along with a number of inmates of Belmarsh Prison, at a joint hearing of the Special Immigration Appeals Commission, challenging their indefinite detention, without charge or trial, on national security grounds. The case (reported as A. v. Secretary of State for the Home Department), went to the House of Lords, which held that the indefinite detention of foreign terrorist suspects without trial was in breach of Articles 5 and 14 of the European Convention on Human Rights, and that the UK's derogation from its obligations under the convention was invalid because it was discriminatory and disproportionate. The decision established key principles about the relationship between the judiciary and the executive. Lord Bingham, the Senior Law Lord, held that the House of Lords was entitled to overrule the decisions made by Government and Parliament in that case. The case subsequently went to the European Court of Human Rights in Strasbourg which upheld the decision of the House of Lords, adding that the secret nature of the procedure was unfair to the accused. In a subsequent decision arising out of the same case, Emmerson successfully argued in the House of Lords that the detention of terrorist suspects could not be justified by reference to evidence obtained by acts of torture committed abroad by the agents of a foreign state.

Between 2005 and 2012, Emmerson successfully defended Ramush Haradinaj, the former Prime Minister of Kosovo, on war crimes charges at the International Criminal Tribunal for the former Yugoslavia (ICTY) in The Hague. Following Haradinaj's acquittal, the Prosecution successfully appealed, and the Appeals Chamber of the ICTY ordered a partial retrial, which concluded in November 2012, with Haradinaj's acquittal a second time. Haradinaj was subsequently re-elected as Kosovo's prime minister in 2016.

In 2014, Emmerson was appointed Counsel for the Independent Panel Inquiry into Child Sexual Abuse in England and Wales. On 29 September 2016, Emmerson was suspended and then resigned from the position. It later emerged that an allegation of sexual assault had been made against him, but an inquiry by a senior judge ruled that the allegation was unfounded.

In 2015 Emmerson represented Marina Litvinenko, wife of Russian ex-KGB agent Alexander Litvinenko, at the public inquiry into his murder in London in 2006, using a radioactive isotope, (Polonium 210). Emmerson argued a successful judicial review challenge to the British Government's refusal to hold a public inquiry to examine the responsibility of the Russian State for Litvinenko's murder. At the completion of the public inquiry, the judge, Robert Owen, found that the Russian State was responsible for ordering the murder, and that Russian President Vladimir Putin had "probably" given his personal approval to the killing. Following the publication of the Inquiry report, Emmerson described the murder as an act of "nuclear terrorism" and called on Prime Minister David Cameron to take effective action, saying that a failure to respond would be a "craven" abdication of his responsibilities. An official spokesperson for the Prime Minister commented: "The conclusion that the murder was authorised at the highest levels of the Russian State is extremely disturbing" and promised to take effective action in response.

In 2016, Emmerson was appointed to the legal team representing Mohamed Nasheed – the first democratically elected President of the Maldives, who was deposed and then imprisoned by the regime of President Yameen Abdul Gayoom. Following a successful claim to the United Nations Working Group on Arbitrary Detention, Nasheed took refuge in the UK. Emmerson was subsequently appointed as international envoy for the Maldives opposition in an unsuccessful attempt to seek dialogue through the UN. In 2018, however, the opposition led by former President Nasheed won democratic elections in the Maldives and returned to power.

In 2018, Emmerson took the case of Catalan president Carles Puigdemont to the UN Human Rights Committee, arguing that the government of Spain had violated his right to participate in political life through a legal crackdown, following an independence referendum in Catalonia in October 2017. He also took up the case of several prominent Catalan politicians and civil society leaders at the UN Working Group on Arbitrary Detention, arising out of their imprisonment in Spain on charges of sedition and rebellion for their part in the 2017 referendum.

The same year, Emmerson appeared at the European Court of Human Rights in two inter-State cases against the Russian Federation. The first case, brought by Georgia, alleged that Russian forces and their proxies in the separatist movements in South Ossetia and Abkhazia committed war crimes during the invasion of Georgia in 2008. At a hearing on 23 May 2018, Emmerson argued that Russian troops were guilty of multiple violations during a "rampage" across Georgian territory in which Russia's aim was to "occupy as much territory as it could get away with".

During 2018, Emmerson also represented the Government of Ukraine in inter-State litigation arising out of Russia's annexation of Crimea, and its sponsorship of the war in Eastern Ukraine.

Emmerson has advised Rohingya victims of human rights violations in Myanmar, and Yazidi victims of human rights violations committed by ISIS in Syria and Iraq.

During the International Criminal Court investigation in Venezuela, Emmerson represented Nicolás Maduro's government its appeal of the process.

== Writing ==
Emmerson was the founder editor of the European Human Rights Law Review and is co-author, with Professor Andrew Ashworth KC, of Human Rights and Criminal Justice (Sweet & Maxwell, 3rd Edition), the leading text on the application of the Convention in criminal cases. From 1995 to 2015 he was the human rights editor of Archbold Criminal Pleading, Evidence and Practice, Evidence and Practice (Sweet & Maxwell).

== Honours ==
Emmerson was appointed as a Commander of the Order of the British Empire (CBE) in the 2020 Birthday Honours for services to international human rights and humanitarian law.

== In popular culture ==
In the 2022 ITVX miniseries Litvinenko, Emmerson was portrayed by Stephen Campbell Moore. In the 2019 movie Official Secrets , he was portrayed by Ralph Fiennes.

Legal offices
Preceded by Martin Scheinin	United Nations Special Rapporteur on Counter Terrorism and Human Rights; 2011–2017
