= Moira House School =

Moira House
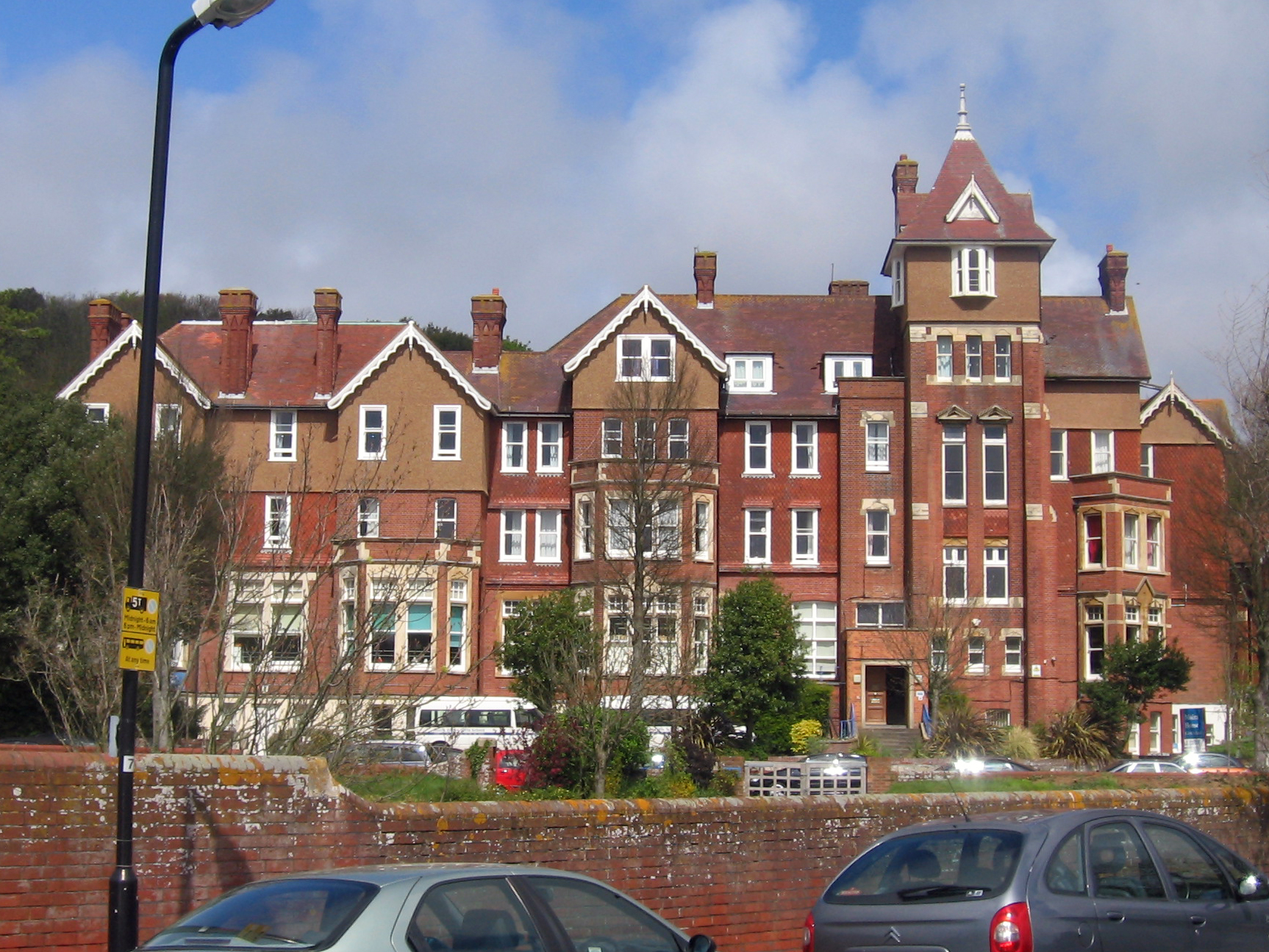

Location
- Upper Carlisle Road; Eastbourne, East Sussex, BN20 7TE; England
- Coordinates: 50.7592°N 0.2627°E

Information
- Type: Private
- Motto: "Nemo a me alienus" - "Other people matter"
- Religious affiliation: Interdenominational
- Established: 1875
- Founder: Charles Ingham
- Closed: 2020
- Department for Education URN: 114651 Tables
- Chair: Andrew Pianca
- School Principal: A. Wood
- Gender: Girls (Boys in nursery, aged 0-4)
- Age: 0 to 18
- Enrolment: c. 320
- Website: http://www.moirahouse.co.uk

Moira House School was an independent day and boarding school for girls aged six to 18 years in Eastbourne, East Sussex, England. The inter-denominational school, which was founded in Surrey in 1875, moved to Eastborne in 1887. It had 312 pupils, including ten boys, with 55 in the sixth form in March 2017.

In 2018, the school merged with Roedean School as part of the newly created Roedean Group of Schools, it was renamed Roedean Moira House. However, in 2020 the school was closed with the majority of pupils transferring to Roedean.

== History ==
The school was established in 1875 by Charles Ingham at Moira House in Surrey. Within a few years it had moved to Eastbourne.

On 27 January 2018, the school merged with Roedean School as part of the newly created Roedean Group of Schools and became known as Roedean Moira House. In March 2020, Andrew Pianca, chairman of governors of Roedean Moira House, announced: “It is with great sadness and regret that we have taken the difficult decision to close Roedean Moira House. Our legal advisors tell us it is the only route available to us.” The decision was blamed on falling numbers of pupils and “financial losses that we cannot sustain”.

An Educational Needs Assessment explored the reasons behind the closure, finding that the school “suffered material operational losses for the financial year ending 2019” and that economic difficulties had been caused by lower demand for independent school places in the Eastbourne area. On 31 May 2022 approval was given for a plan to redevelop the five-acre Moira House School campus into a residential development of 33 apartments and 19 houses. The school's ancillary buildings, including the gym and swimming pool, would be demolished, but the three original 19th-century houses would be turned into housing.

On 19 October 2025, a fire broke out in the former buildings resulting in eight fire engines having to attend.

== Houses ==
The school had a house system, and sisters were usually allocated to the same house. The houses had names from myths and legends:

- Excalibur, symbolised by a sword and the colour gold
- Pegasus, symbolised by a pegasus and the colour white
- Vulcan, symbolised by a flame and the colour red
- Merlin, symbolised by a wizard and the colour green

== Sports ==
With views over the sea, the school grounds at Eastbourne opened directly onto the South Downs National Park, providing walking, cycling and pony trekking opportunities for the girls. Playing fields, including astroturf, provided for lawn tennis, cricket, football, field hockey, netball, lacrosse, and athletics. The school also had a 25-metre indoor heated swimming pool, and a sports hall. An equestrian centre was opened in September 2016.

== Music ==
Visiting staff taught cello, clarinet, flute, guitar, piano, recorder, saxophone, violin, vocal etc. Girls who wished to do so were able to take Associated Board of Examination music exams. The Chamber Choir performed locally, such as at Canterbury Cathedral. Every two years there was a Performing Arts Tour which involved flying to other parts of the world to perform, and destinations included San Francisco, Hong Kong, Australia, Dubai, and Barbados. The last tour was to New York City, where the choir sang at the Empire State Building, the United Nations Building and the Statue of Liberty. Girls could study musical theatre and take LAMDA exams in drama.

== Former pupils ==
- Isabelle Allen (born 2002), actress
- Susannah Corbett (born 1968), actress and author
- Karin Giannone (born 1974), news presenter at BBC News
- Rumer Godden (1907–1998), author
- Katharine Gun (born 1974), British linguist and whistleblower
- Gina Miller (born 1965), initiator of R (Miller) v Secretary of State for Exiting the European Union
- Christina Oxenberg (born 1962), writer and journalist
- Prunella Scales (1932–2025), actress
