= Gina Miller =

Guyanese-British business owner (born 1965)

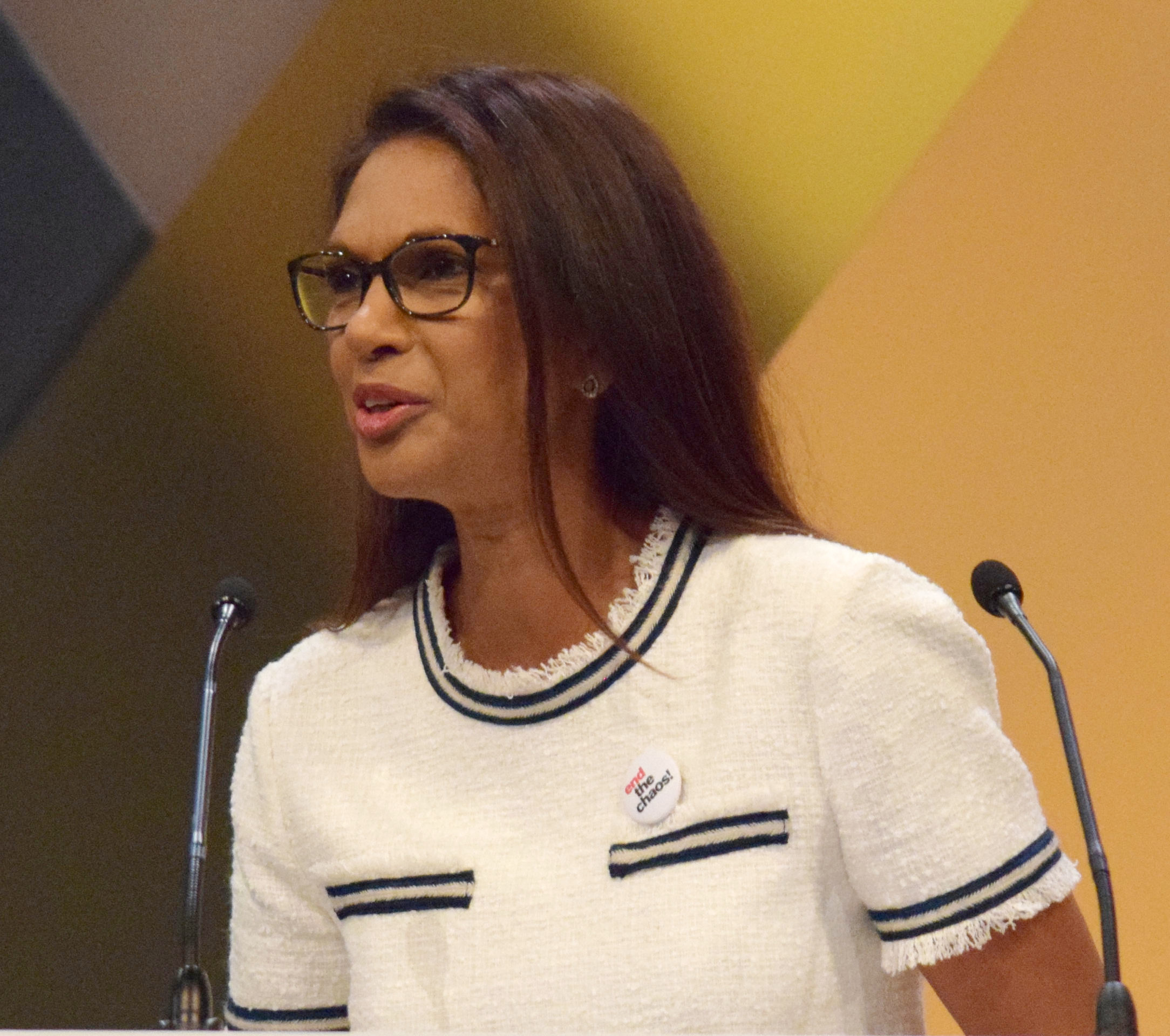
- Miller in 2018
- Born: Gina Nadira Singh; 19 April 1965 (age 61); British Guiana
- Education: Moira House School
- Alma mater: University of East London
- Occupation: Investment manager
- Known for: Challenging the UK government's assumption of the right to invoke Article 50 without reference to Parliament, and the prorogation of the UK parliament in 2019.
- Political party: True and Fair Party
- Spouses: Adrian Beal (m. 1985, divorced) Jon Maguire (m. 2000; div. 2002) Alan Miller (m. 2007)
- Children: 3
- Parents: Doodnauth Singh (father); Savitri Singh (mother)

Gina Nadira Miller (née Singh; born 19 April 1965) is a Guyanese-British business owner and activist who initiated the 2016 R (Miller) v Secretary of State for Exiting the European Union court case against the British government over its authority to implement Brexit without approval from Parliament. In September 2019, she successfully challenged the government's prorogation of Parliament, formally supported in the legal proceedings by the former prime minister Sir John Major and the shadow attorney general, Shami Chakrabarti. She founded the True and Fair Campaign in 2012, calling for an end to financial misconduct in the investment and pension industries. Miller was a candidate in the 2025 University of Cambridge Chancellor election.

== Biography ==
Miller was born Gina Nadira Singh in British Guiana to Savitri and Doodnauth Singh, who later became the Attorney General of Guyana. She is of Hindu Indo-Guyanese descent. On her father's side, she traces her origin to Chhindwara, Madhya Pradesh in India. She grew up in the newly independent Guyana, and was sent to England by her parents at the age of 10 to be educated at an independent boarding school, Moira House in Eastbourne.

When she was 14, Guyana introduced strict currency controls that prevented their parents from continuing to send funds for Gina and her brother, so she took a summer job as a chambermaid in an Eastbourne hotel. She studied law at the Polytechnic of East London (now University of East London) but left without completing her finals because her parents wanted her to return to Guyana.

She has written that she was brutally attacked while at law school, that some of her attackers were fellow students, and that the attack caused her to give up her degree course. She stated "I was attacked because I was not behaving like I was supposed to be behaving.... I was being too western." The attackers were Asian, and they had mistaken her for being Indian. She gained a degree in marketing, and an MSc in human resource management at the University of East London. In 2017, she received an honorary Doctorate of Laws from the University of East London, 30 years from when she had attended as a student.

She owned a property photographic laboratory in 1987, before becoming a marketing and event manager at BMW Fleet Division in 1990. She started a specialist financial services marketing agency in 1992, and launched the Senate investment conference programme in 1996. She became a marketing consultant in 2006. In February 2009, Miller co-founded the investment firm SCM Private (now SCM Direct) with her husband Alan Miller. She has been a leading campaigner against hidden charges in pensions and investment and what she has described as "flagrant mis-selling within the asset management market". She set up Miller Philanthropy (rebranded to the True and Fair Foundation) in 2009 (which closed in 2019), and established MoneyShe.com in 2014, as a female-focused investment brand.

She has married three times, and has three children.

In October 2017, Miller was named by Powerlist as the "UK's most influential black person" which recognises those of African and African Caribbean heritage. Those nominated were chosen by an independent panel with members including former High Court judge Dame Linda Dobbs and former Apprentice winner Tim Campbell. They rated nominees on their "ability to change lives and alter events". She was also named number 26 on the list of most influential British Asians by GG2 Power List.

== True and Fair Foundation ==
Miller set up the True and Fair Foundation in 2009, with the stated aim of increasing philanthropy and common good in an era of growing inequality, social fragmentation and small state funding. It aimed to encourage those who have been successful to give back to the communities that afforded them their success, lessening the burden of giving for donors and philanthropists who wish to give smarter and in an efficient and transparent manner but may be time poor. The Foundation was a registered charity under English law and was removed from the register in July 2019.

In December 2015, the True and Fair foundation published a report, ‘A Hornet’s Nest: A Review of Charitable Spending by UK Charities’, which alleged that of 5,453 charities surveyed, 1,020 were spending less than half of their income on charitable activities. The report was sharply criticised by charities and voluntary sector bodies for being based on misunderstanding or misinterpretation of how charities report income and expenditure from their trading arms, e.g. charity shops, leading to a misleading picture.

The True and Fair Foundation closed in 2019 with trustees saying the charity had stopped operating in the Autumn of 2018. It had come under regulatory scrutiny in its latter years. The True and Fair Foundation was issued with formal regulatory advice in 2016 and in March 2019 the Charity Commission said it was "not clear" if the charity had complied.

=== True and Fair Campaign ===
In January 2012, Miller set up the True and Fair Campaign, with the stated aim to "limit the possibility of future mis-selling or financial scandals through greater transparency." This initiative attracted the animosity of part of the City, earning her the nickname of "black widow spider". She reported being called "a disgrace [whose] lobbying efforts would bring down the entire City".

On 27 September 2021, she launched a political party, the True and Fair Party. In a statement she said that her new party "champions greater transparency, accountability, competency than existing political parties provide".

== Brexit legal challenge ==
In June 2016, subsequent to the United Kingdom European Union membership referendum, Miller privately engaged the City of London law firm Mishcon de Reya to challenge the authority of the British Government to invoke Article 50 of the Treaty on European Union using prerogative powers, arguing that only Parliament can take away rights that Parliament has granted.

On 3 November 2016, the High Court of Justice ruled that Parliament had to legislate before the Government could invoke Article 50. Miller said outside the High Court: "The judgment, I hope – when it's read by the Government and they contemplate the full judgment – that they will make the wise decision of not appealing but pressing forward and having a proper debate in our sovereign Parliament, our mother of parliaments that we are so admired for all over the world".

=== Motivations ===
Miller stated in various interviews that her motivations for pressing on with the legal action were upholding Parliamentary sovereignty and democracy. Others, however, particularly Brexit supporters, have accused her of attempting to obstruct the undertaking of Brexit.

=== Outcome ===
The Government's appeal to the Supreme Court was heard in December 2016. When closing the hearing, the Court President said that the appeal raised important constitutional issues, and the Justices would take time to give full consideration to the many arguments presented to them, orally and in writing, and they would do their best to resolve the case as quickly as possible. When the Supreme Court delivered its judgment in January 2017, it upheld the High Court ruling by a majority of 8–3.

After the government's appeal was dismissed, the Secretary of State for Exiting the EU formally introduced in Parliament, on 26 January 2017, a bill that, on 16 March, was enacted without amendment as the European Union (Notification of Withdrawal) Act 2017.

On 31 January 2020, the United Kingdom officially left the European Union following a vote by MPs in favour of the EU (Withdrawal Agreement) Bill, 358 to 234 - a majority of 124; the bill also banned an extension of the transition period, beyond its expiry at the end of 2020. Miller held a 1 minute silence outside of her property in early February 2020.

=== Abuse and threats ===
The legal challenge met with a "torrent" of abuse from supporters of Brexit, including racial abuse and death threats. In the two days following the judges' decision, more than 79,000 tweets mentioned her account, of which about 13 per cent were hostile. Many referred to her as a traitor and mentioned her perceived foreignness. The law firm Miller hired for the case, Mishcon de Reya, was subjected to abuse as a result of its involvement in the case, and Brexit supporters mounted a protest outside the firm's offices. A man, aged 55, was arrested in November 2016 on suspicion of racially aggravated malicious communications over threats to Miller, but was later told he would not be prosecuted.

Another man, aged 50, was arrested in January 2017, also in relation to the complaint made in November; the second man was later named as Rhodri Philipps, 4th Viscount St Davids, who was charged on 7 March. Philipps, of Knightsbridge, London, described Miller as a "boat jumper" and added: "If this is what we should expect from immigrants, send them back to their stinking jungles". Philipps also posted "£5,000 for the first person to 'accidentally' run over this bloody troublesome first generation immigrant" on Facebook. He pleaded "not guilty" to three charges of malicious communication under section 127 of the Communications Act 2003 when he appeared at Westminster Magistrates' Court on 2 May 2017. At the May hearing, the prosecution said the crown would seek an increased sentence because of the racial aggravation factor. He was found guilty of two charges at his trial on 11 July 2017, at which he defended himself. Philipps described his own comments as "satire". He was later sentenced to 12 weeks in prison.

At least eight other people were issued with cease and desist notices by the police. In August 2017, Miller said she had faced continuing threats of acid attacks in recent months, and fears leaving her home.

In October 2019, detectives with the Metropolitan Police launched an investigation into a GoFundMe campaign seeking to raise £10,000 to hire a hitman to kill Miller.

== Election activity ==
=== 2017 general election ===
Miller organised a crowdfunding campaign to back candidates opposed to a 'hard Brexit' in the 2017 general election. As of 21 April 2017, the campaign had raised over £300,000. On 26 April 2017, Miller launched the Best for Britain campaign at the Institute of Contemporary Arts in London. The campaign called for a tactical vote to ensure elected MPs have a real final vote on the Brexit deal. It also encouraged young people to become actively engaged in the Brexit debate. She stated publicly that she personally would vote Liberal Democrat for the first time, having previously been a Labour supporter. She left Best for Britain after the election, describing it as both "a room full of white males deciding what's going to happen to the country" and "undemocratic".

She also launched a legal challenge against the Conservative–DUP agreement, the confidence-and-supply agreement secured by Theresa May's government in the aftermath of the election.

=== 2019 European Parliament election ===
On 8 May 2019, Miller set up a website, Remain United, to encourage tactical voting in the EU parliamentary election on 23 May, to maximise the number of MEPs of various parties elected who support remaining in the EU.

== Prorogation of parliament legal challenge ==
On 28 August 2019, Miller was one of a number of parties to launch legal proceedings against the Johnson government for advising the Queen to prorogue parliament, claiming to do so was unconstitutional. On 6 September 2019, the High Court ruled that the advice was not justiciable and dismissed her case, but granted permission to appeal. A similar case lodged before the Scottish Court of Session ruled several days later that the advice was justiciable, that it was motivated by an intention to circumvent Parliamentary accountability, and the it was unlawful, void and of no effect, setting up a hearing before the Supreme Court for 17 September. On 24 September 2019, the Supreme Court ruled unanimously that the advice, and subsequent prorogation, were unlawful, void and of no effect because it had "the effect of frustrating or preventing, without reasonable justification, the ability of Parliament to carry out its constitutional functions as a legislature and as the body responsible for the supervision of the executive."

== Political activity ==
In June 2018, Miller led the People’s March for a People’s Vote on the final Brexit deal alongside Liberal Democrat and Green party leaders Vince Cable and Caroline Lucas and Conservative Anna Soubry.

In September 2018 Miller addressed the Liberal Democrat party conference where she told the delegates she was not a member of any party, and was speaking to them as a "friend" who felt a bond over so many issues, but added: "I am not addressing you as your leader in waiting."

=== True and Fair Party ===
In September 2021, Miller announced the foundation of a new political party called the True and Fair Party. The party was formally launched on 13 January 2022. On 1 February 2022, it was announced that the Renew Party had merged its operations into the True and Fair Party. On 28 July 2023, it was reported that the True and Fair Party's bank account would be shut down by online bank Monzo, and that Miller had not been given an explanation for the closure. Monzo later said they did not accept political parties as customers, and that the True and Fair Party's account was not originally categorised as such in the application.

She was her party's candidate for Epsom and Ewell for the 2024 general election. Miller was not elected, coming sixth out of the seven candidates and achieving a 1.5 per cent vote share, thereby losing her deposit.
