= Doodnauth Singh =

Guyanese politician (1933–2013)

Attorney General and Minister of Legal Affairs
- In office 16 June 2001 – 1 February 2009
- President: Bharrat Jagdeo
- Prime Minister: Sam Hinds

Member of the National Assembly
- In office 2001–2009

Personal details
- Born: 16 June 1933 Corentyne, British Guiana
- Died: 21 August 2013 (aged 80) Georgetown, Guyana
- Party: People's Progressive Party
- Spouse(s): Susan Teal; Savitri Singh
- Children: 6, including Gina

Doodnauth Singh (16 June 1933 – 21 August 2013) was Attorney General of Guyana from 2001 to 2009, and also served as a People's Progressive Party (PPP) Member of the National Assembly.

He was educated at Skeldon High School, Central High School in Georgetown, and London's Regent Street Polytechnic (Diploma in Economics), and was called to the bar at Middle Temple in December 1958. He was a former chairman of the Guyana Elections Commission (GECOM). He had six children, including Gina Miller.

Singh's practice extended to the Caribbean, representing individuals in many countries, including in 1990 as defense counsel for Anisa Abu Bakr, wife of Yasin Abu Bakr, in the failed coup in Trinidad and Tobago. He is also part of the legal team appearing in the murder trial of former Grenadian prime minister Maurice Bishop. In addition, he served as a prosecutor under Eugenia Charles in Dominica.

In 1997, he was chairman of the Electoral Commission for the presidential and regional elections.

He was Attorney General of Guyana between 2001 and 2009.
