= Katharine Gun =

British linguist, translator and whistleblower (born 1974)

- Born: Katharine Teresa Harwood; 1974 (age 51–52)
- Education: St Mary's College, Durham; University of Birmingham
- Occupation: Linguist
- Organization: GCHQ
- Known for: whistle blowing

Katharine Teresa Gun (née Harwood; born 1974) is a British linguist who worked as a translator for the Government Communications Headquarters (GCHQ). In 2003, she leaked top-secret information to a friend who passed it to The Observer. The information concerned a request from the United States for compromising intelligence on diplomats from member states of the 2003 United Nations Security Council, who were due to vote on a second UN resolution on the prospective 2003 invasion of Iraq.

== Early life ==
Gun moved to Taiwan in 1977 with her parents, Paul and Jan Harwood. Her father studied Chinese at Durham University and taught at Tunghai University in the city of Taichung, central Taiwan.

After spending her childhood in Taiwan, where she attended Morrison Academy until age 16, she returned to Britain to study for her A-levels at Moira House School, a girls' boarding school in Eastbourne. Her upbringing later led her to describe herself as a "third culture kid". In 1993 she began studying Japanese and Chinese at Durham University.

She graduated with an upper second-class degree, then took a job as an assistant English teacher with the JET program in Hiroshima, Japan. She left teaching in 1999, and after some temporary jobs, finding it difficult to find work as a linguist, she applied to GCHQ in 2001 after reading a newspaper advertisement for the organisation. She was previously unaware of GCHQ, and later said, "I didn't have much idea about what they did...I was going into it pretty much blind. Most people do."

She has a younger brother who was teaching in Taiwan.

== Leak ==
Her regular job at GCHQ in Cheltenham was to translate Mandarin Chinese into English. While at work at GCHQ on 31 January 2003, she read an email from Frank Koza, the chief of staff at the "regional targets" division of the National Security Agency, the American signals intelligence agency.

Koza's email requested aid in a secret operation to bug the United Nations offices of six countries: Angola, Bulgaria, Cameroon, Chile, Guinea and Pakistan. These were the six "swing nations" on the UN Security Council that could determine whether the UN approved the invasion of Iraq.

Outraged by the email, she took a printed copy of it home. After contemplating the email over the weekend, she gave it to a friend who was acquainted with journalists. In February, she travelled to London to take part in the demonstration against the impending invasion of Iraq. She heard no more of the email, and had all but forgotten it until Sunday 2 March, when she saw it reproduced on the front page of The Observer newspaper. Less than a week after the Observer story, on Wednesday 5 March, she confessed to her line manager at GCHQ that she had leaked the email, and was arrested. In a BBC interview with Jeremy Paxman, she said that she had not raised the matter with staff counsellors as she "honestly didn't think that would have had any practical effect". She spent a night in police custody, and eight months later was charged with breaking the Official Secrets Act. While waiting to hear whether she would be charged, she embarked on a postgraduate degree course in global ethics at the University of Birmingham.

== Court case ==
On 13 November 2003, she was charged with an offence under section 1 of the Official Secrets Act 1989. Her case became a cause célèbre among activists, and many people stepped forward to urge the government to drop the case. Among them, from the US, were the Reverend Jesse Jackson, Daniel Ellsberg (the US government official who leaked the Pentagon Papers), and Congressman Dennis Kucinich.

The case came to court on 25 February 2004. Within half an hour, the case was dropped because the prosecution declined to offer evidence. At the time, the reasons for the Attorney-General to drop the case were unclear. The day before the trial, the defence team had asked the government for any records of legal advice about the lawfulness of the war that it had received during the run-up to the war. A full trial might have exposed any such documents to public scrutiny, as the defence was expected to argue that trying to stop an unlawful war of aggression outweighed her obligations under the Official Secrets Act. She was defended by Alex Bailin KC. Speculation was rife in the media that the prosecution service had bowed to political pressure to drop the case so that any such documents would remain secret. A government spokesman said that the decision to drop the case was made before the defence's demands were submitted. The Guardian newspaper had reported plans to drop the case the previous week. On the day of the court hearing, Gun said, "I'm just baffled in the 21st century [that] we as human beings are still dropping bombs on each other as a means to resolve issues." In May 2019 The Guardian said the case was dropped "when the prosecution realised that evidence would emerge ... that even British government lawyers believed the invasion was unlawful."

The 2019 film Official Secrets, which recounts Gun's actions in 2003, suggests that the case against her was dropped because Gun's defence team asked for disclosure of the attorney general's pre-invasion advice to Tony Blair about the legality of the invasion. In September 2019, Ken Macdonald, the former director of public prosecutions, said the case against her was dropped because a fair trial would not have been possible without the disclosure of information that would compromise national security. Gavin Hood, the director of Official Secrets, expressed scepticism about MacDonald's statement and called for the declassification of the official documents referred to by MacDonald.

== Personal life ==
Gun's husband, Yaşar Gün, is a Turkish Kurd. As of 2020, Gun lives in Turkey and visits Britain. After the charges against her were dropped in 2004, she found it difficult to find new employment. As of 2019, she had been living in Turkey for several years with her husband and their 11-year-old daughter.

== Later life ==
Gun received the Sam Adams Award for 2003 and was supported in her case by the UK human rights pressure group Liberty and in the US by the Institute for Public Accuracy. Following the dropping of the case, Liberty commented, "One wonders whether disclosure in this criminal trial might have been a little too embarrassing."

Two years after her trial, Gun wrote an article titled "Iran: Time to Leak", which asked whistleblowers to make public any information about plans for a potential war against Iran. She urged "those in a position to do so to disclose information which relates to this planned aggression; legal advice, meetings between the White House and other intelligence agencies, assessments of Iran's threat level (or better yet, evidence that assessments have been altered), troop deployments and army notifications. Don't let 'the intelligence and the facts be fixed around the policy' this time."

== In film ==
In January 2019, the film Official Secrets, recounting Gun's actions in 2003, received its premiere at the Sundance Film Festival, with Keira Knightley playing Gun. Daniel Ellsberg praised the swiftness and importance of Gun taking action, saying it was in some ways more significant than his own whistleblowing on the Vietnam War. In July 2019, in a lengthy interview on the US program Democracy Now!, Gun, Gavin Hood (the film's writer, director and producer), as well as Martin Bright and Ed Vulliamy (the journalists who broke the story of the leaked memo) discussed the events that the film describes. Together with journalist Peter Beaumont, Gun advised and consulted over the years it took to make the film and they are "very happy with the result."

== See also ==
- United Nations Security Council and the Iraq War – Security Council positions before war
- Graymail – Threatened revelation of state secrets
- Jock Kane – GCHQ whistleblower, banned books author
- Clive Ponting – British civil servant and historian (1946–2020), cleared of breaking the Official Secrets Act, resulting in the law being tightened
- Sarah Tisdall – FCO whistleblower (1983)
- List of whistleblowers (worldwide, all sectors)
- Speaking truth to power – Non-violent political tactic employed by dissidents
