= Martin Bright =

British journalist (born 1966)

- Born: Martin Derek Bright; 5 June 1966 (age 60)
- Education: Queen Elizabeth's Hospital; University of Cambridge; School of Oriental and African Studies (University of London)
- Occupations: Journalist; Author
- Spouse: Vanessa Thorpe
- Children: 2
- Writing career
- Genre: Non-fiction
- Subjects: Terrorist attacks in Britain and abroad; Muslim extremism

Martin Derek Bright (born 5 June 1966) is a British journalist. He worked for the BBC World Service and The Guardian before becoming The Observer's education correspondent and then home affairs editor. From 2005 to 2009, he was the political editor of New Statesman. He had a blog for The Spectator, and was The Jewish Chronicle's political editor from September 2009 to March 2013. In 2014 he took a position at the Tony Blair Faith Foundation, but resigned after five months over a lack of editorial autonomy.

Since the late twentieth century, he has particularly covered the rise of Muslim extremism, terrorist attacks in Britain and abroad, and aspects of British governmental relations with the Muslim community in the United Kingdom.

In 2009 Bright founded New Deal of the Mind, a charitable company to promote employment in creative fields and working with organisations, government and all political parties.

== Education ==
From 1977 to 1984, Bright was educated at Queen Elizabeth's Hospital, a private day school for boys in the city of Bristol in South West England, followed by Magdalene College, Cambridge, where he gained a BA Hons. in English Literature in 1987. In 1996, he gained an MA in the History of Asia and Africa at the School of Oriental and African Studies (part of the University of London).

== Career ==
In 2001, Bright wrote "The Great Koran Con Trick", an article in the New Statesman about the work of the scholars John Wansbrough, Michael Cook, Patricia Crone, Andrew Rippin and Gerald Hawting, associated in the 1970s with the University of London's School of Oriental and African Studies (SOAS). He reported the work of the scholars as "revisionist history" of Islam. They have developed new techniques of analysis, in some cases adopting methods from earlier biblical studies and using a wider range of sources, including non-Muslim, non-Arabic texts. Their conclusions have included:

- little is known about the life of the Muslim prophet Mohammad;
- rapid expansion of the religion could be due to its appeal "of conquest and jihad for the tribes of the Arabian peninsula";
- the Koran as known was likely compiled, or written long after Mohammad's death in 632 AD.
- Arabs and Jews were allied against Christianity in the earliest days of Islam; and
- some scholars have suggested that Islam, like Christianity, may be considered a "heretical branch of rabbinical Judaism."

Bright's arguments were ridiculed and debunked by the very scholars—including his own former SOAS tutor, Professor Gerald Hawting—whose work he drew upon to support his cover story. Three of these scholars wrote to the New Statesman raising objections to the article with one commenting that the "spurious air of conspiracy and censorship conjured up in Martin Bright‘s article is nonsense".

Bright claimed that new archeological finds, such as scraps of manuscript at the Great Mosque of Sana'a in Yemen, have supported suggestions of the development of the Koran over time. Some of the scholars reportedly disagreed with Bright's characterization of their work. The article was considered controversial among traditionalist Muslims. The Muslim intellectual Ziauddin Sardar argued the SOAS scholars approached the material from a Eurocentric point of view.

In a documentary, Who Speaks for Muslims? (2002), and When Progressives Treat with Reactionaries: The British State's flirtation with radical Islamism (2006), a report for the right-wing Policy Exchange think tank, Bright has examined issues of the contemporary Muslim community in the United Kingdom and the government's relationship with its constituencies. This has been a focus of his journalism.

Bright left the New Statesman in January 2009, and began writing a blog, "The Bright Stuff – Dispatches from Enemy Territory," for The Spectator.

In January 2009, Bright formed New Deal of the Mind, a coalition of artists, entrepreneurs, academics and opinion formers working to boost employment in Britain's creative sector during the recession. The organisation was launched formally at Number 11 Downing Street on 24 March 2009. The launch seminar was attended by more than 60 of Britain's leading creative industry figures, as well as several ministers and politicians from across the political spectrum.

In September 2009, Bright joined The Jewish Chronicle as political editor. He left the publication in March 2013, but returned as a columnist, remaining until January, 2014.

In January, 2014, he took a position at the Tony Blair Faith Foundation as editor of a new website on religion and globalisation produced in conjunction with the Harvard Divinity School. He resigned after five months, feeling Blair did not give him the autonomy he needed.

== Marriage and family ==
Bright is married to Vanessa Thorpe, the arts correspondent of The Observer; the couple have two children.

== Works ==
- He was presenter of Channel 4's 30 Minutes documentary, Who Speaks For Muslims? (2002), about the Muslim community in the United Kingdom. The Muslim Council of Britain sent a letter to Channel 4 protesting what it described as several errors in the documentary, as well as a generally negative tone suggesting it supported radical Islam.
- Bright wrote When Progressives Treat with Reactionaries: The British State's flirtation with radical Islamism (2006), a report exploring British state funding of political Islam and Foreign Office overtures to radical groups. It was published by Policy Exchange, which Bright described as a centre-right thinktank.
- Martin presented the documentary Vanished: the Surrey Schoolgirl about an unsolved missing person case he reported on in the mid-1990s.

== Legacy and honours ==
- 2009, Bright was on the journalism long list for the Orwell Prize.
- Bright's Observer article on information revealed by whistleblower Katharine Gun features prominently in the film Official Secrets, where Bright is played by Matt Smith.
