= Yassin Kadi =

Saudi Arabian businessman (born 1955)

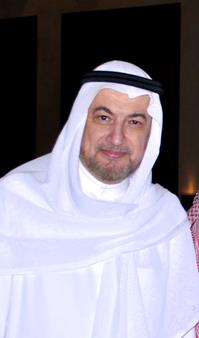
Yassin Kadi

Yassin Abdullah Kadi (Arabic: ياسين قاضي; also transliterated from Arabic as Yasin Abdullah Ezzedine al-Qadi or Yasin A. Kahdi) (born 23 February 1955) is a Saudi Arabian businessman. A multi-millionaire from Jeddah, Kadi trained as an architect in Chicago, Illinois. He is the son-in-law of Sheikh Ahmed Salah Jamjoom, a former Saudi Arabian government minister with close ties to the Saudi royal family.

The UN placed sanctions against Kadi in 1999 and 2000, when he was named by United Nations Security Council Resolutions 1267 and 1333 as a suspected associate of Osama bin Laden's terror network, al-Qaeda. On 12 October 2001, the U.S. Department of Treasury's Office of Foreign Assets Control (OFAC) ordered his assets in the United States to be frozen. The European Union also applied sanctions to Kadi. In response, Kadi's lawyers brought two lawsuits now considered landmarks in EU law and public international law, known as Kadi I (2008) and Kadi II (2013). The case for which he is best known, a 2008 decision by the European Court of Justice, Kadi I, is thought to have challenged "the core framework of UN terrorist sanctions and forces UN member states to tackle difficult legal questions or else face possible collapse of the UN’s terrorist sanctions regime."

Kadi's listing as a terrorist was overturned by several European courts, and his name was removed from blacklists by Switzerland (2007), the European Union (2008 and 2010), and the United Kingdom (2008 and 2010). In September 2010, Kadi "succeeded in having dismissed in their entirety the civil claims brought against him in the United States on behalf of the families of the 9/11 victims", when a U.S. District Judge ruled that the District Court for the Southern District of New York had no jurisdiction over Kadi, a Saudi Arabian citizen. In October 2012, the UN Security Council committee monitoring sanctions against al-Qaeda granted Kadi's petition to be removed from its blacklist. The Kadi II decision by the European Court of Justice in July 2013 declined appeals by the European Commission and the UK against the earlier annulment of European sanctions against Kadi, saying that there was no evidence to substantiate the allegations of his being linked to terrorism. On 26 November 2014, the United States Department of the Treasury removed Kadi's name from its Specially Designated Nationals list.

== Early life ==
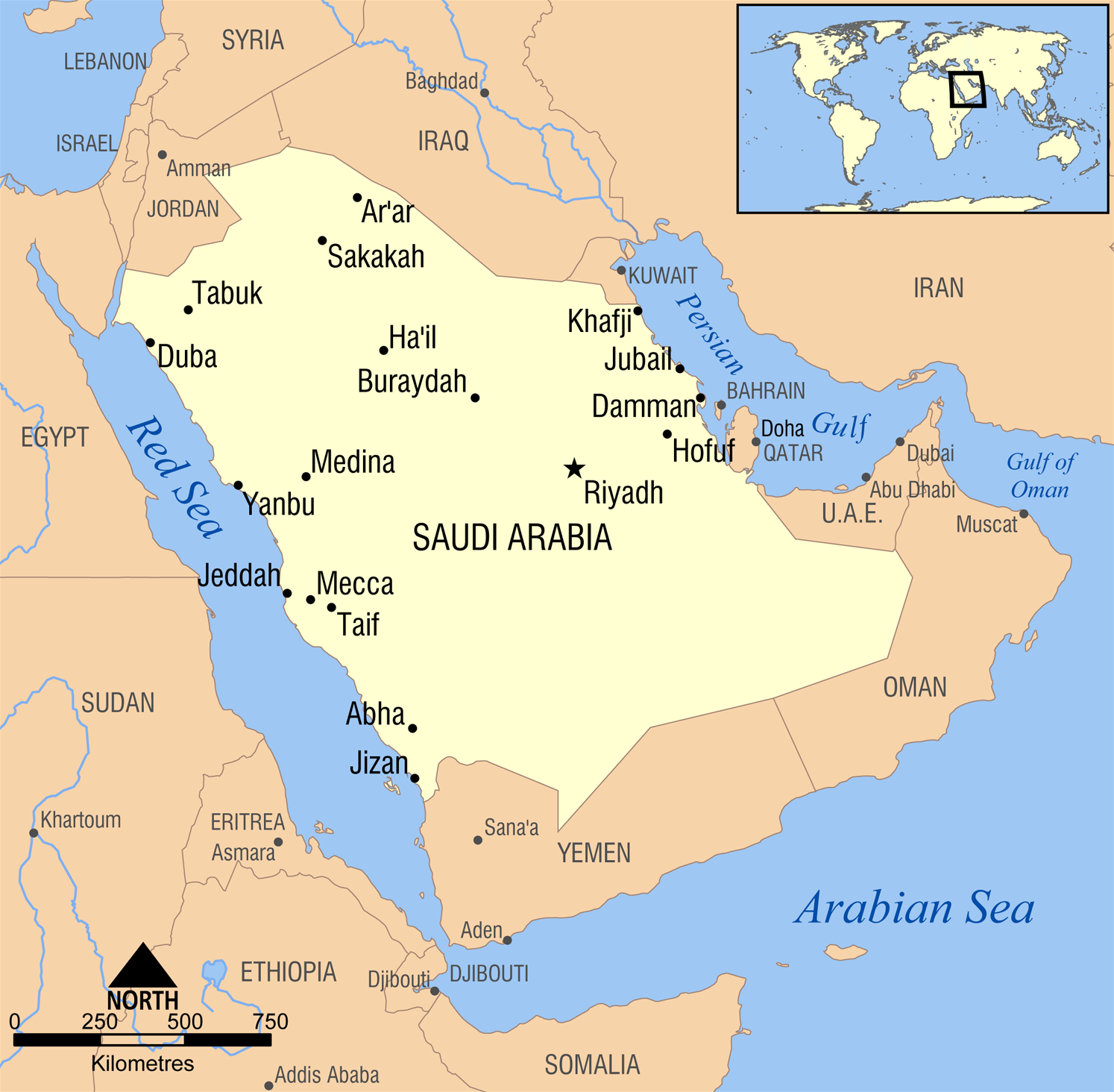
Present Saudi Arabia

Kadi was born 23 February 1955 in Cairo, Egypt. His father became a successful businessman in Jeddah, Saudi Arabia. He has six sisters and no brothers.

Around 1977, Kadi earned a bachelor's degree in architectural engineering from Alexandria University in Cairo, Egypt, and subsequently became an intern at the architectural firm Skidmore, Owings & Merrill in Chicago from July 1979 to February 1981. He helped the firm develop a master plan and contract documentation for the Mecca Campus of the King Abdulaziz University.

Yassin Kadi married a daughter of Sheikh Ahmed Salah Jamjoom sometime before 1981. He and his wife have seven children, One of his sons is a U.S. citizen.

== Business and nonprofit ventures ==
In the 1980s, Kadi became a vice president of the Jamjoom Group, a multi-national conglomerate headquartered in Jeddah. Around 1986, Yassin Kadi became one of the principal investors in BMI Inc., a Shariah-compliant investment bank based in New Jersey.

Kadi inherited "several million dollars" in 1988. In 1990, he began to establish close business associations with Saudi billionaire Khalid bin Mahfouz, whose family owned a majority interest in Saudi Arabia's largest bank, the National Commercial Bank. Kadi said that he was brought in to maintain good financial relations with pious Muslims throughout the Islamic world, by building a more shariah-compliant banking network for the bank. "We devised systems of leasing and ways to borrow money" that could be used by pious Muslims, who are not allowed to charge interest, Kadi told the Chicago Tribune.

In May 1992, Kadi created the Muwafaq Foundation, an Islamic charity incorporated for the stated purpose of providing famine relief and education in the Islamic world, particularly Pakistan. The charity was incorporated as a trust on the island of Jersey, an off-shore tax haven located near the coast of Normandy, France. Officials on the island told the Guardian that Jersey "does not appear to maintain any public record of the Muwafaq Foundation. "They said "if it was structured as a financial trust, it would not require to be registered at all." Kadi personally donated about $15 to $20 million from his fortune, and solicited donations from bin Mahfouz and other wealthy Saudi families. Bin Mahfouz became a principal donor but later said that he was not involved in the operation of the charity after its establishment.

A similarly named organization, the "Muwaffaq Society" or "Muwaffaq Ltd.," was registered in the Isle of Man in June 1991, but Kadi denied any relationship to this entity. Plaintiffs who have filed suit against Kadi and his associates claim that Muwafaq was a charitable front used to funnel money to al-Qaeda, an allegation Mr Kadi has repeatedly denied.

In 1996, Kadi became one of the original founders and financial supporters of the Dar Al-Hekma Private College for Girls, a "path-breaking Saudi women's college" based in Jeddah. At the time of the 11 September attacks, he was serving as the Secretary-General of the college.

=== Business activity after 2001 ===
According to Victor D. Comras, "Al Kadi is believed to have acted swiftly after 9/11 to restructure many of his business interests and, while retaining actual control, placed many of his own assets into the hands of nominal managers and directors." In 2005, the New York Times estimated that Kadi's net worth "exceeds $65 million." In 2010, Comras described him as a billionaire, citing his extensive international business holdings.

== Terrorism blacklist ==
=== Meetings with Osama bin Laden ===
In an October 2001 interview with the Chicago Tribune, Kadi said that he met with Osama bin Laden at religious gatherings in the 1980s, but "he said the encounters were unremarkable at a time when bin Laden's battle against the Soviets in Afghanistan attracted US government support and donations from Mosques around the United States."

In a December 2008 interview with the New York Times, Kadi added that he once met Osama bin Laden in Chicago. He gives the date as 1981. Steven Coll, a biographer of the Bin Laden family discovered that the date of the visit was 1979. Osama "was here for two weeks in 1979, it seems, and he visited Los Angeles and Indiana, among other places."

The date coincides with Kadi's arrival in Chicago in July 1979. Coll gives as his source a 2009 biography written by Osama's first wife, Najwa Bin Laden.

=== 1991: Loan Linked to Hamas ===
In 1991, Kadi loaned $820,000 to the Quranic Literacy Institute (QLI) of Oak Lawn, IL, a group formed to disseminate the Koran and Muslim texts but later allegedly linked to Hamas. Kadi told the Chicago Tribune he made the loan because of his friendship with the literacy institute's president, whom he met at a Sunday lecture in the Chicago area.

Kadi said the money was intended to allow the institute to make a land investment, which would yield profits that would support its charitable work.

=== 1998: Funds Al-Iman University ===
In 1998, Kadi donated money toward the construction of housing for students at Al-Iman University in Sanaa, Yemen. The university's name is also translated as Iman University or Al-Eman.

A 2010 New York Times profile of the university indicates it is run by Muslims who follow Salafist practice, that is, a strict and puritanical form of Islam practiced by the Salafi ("ancestors" or first Muslims ). Al-Iman is "not a typical college," says Glenn R. Simpson of the Wall Street Journal. "Its curriculum primarily concerns the study and propagation of radical Islam."

=== January - August 1998: Linked to Maram ===
According to Glenn R. Simpson of the Wall Street Journal, Kadi's bank records show that, between January and August 1998, he transferred $1.25 million from his Geneva bank account through an associate to an alleged al-Qaeda front company in Turkey known as Maram. Founded as a travel agency and import-export business, the company Maram was reportedly established by Mamdouh Mahmud Salim, said to be one of al-Qaeda's founding members and to have a history of moving money and shopping for weapons for the organization.

A few months later, in December 1998, Kadi reportedly transferred shares in the company to two other men. One was Wael Hamza Julaidan, a Saudi businessman said to be a founder of al-Qaeda (the US officially designated Julaidan a financial supporter of al-Qaeda in 2002). The other was reported to be Mohammed Bayazid, another alleged founder of al-Qaeda.

On 20 December 1998 Salim was extradited to the United States, where he was charged with participating in the 1998 United States embassy bombings. In 2010, USA Today reported that he is an inmate of the ADX Florence facility in Florence, Colorado (reg.nr. 42426–054), sentenced to life without parole for stabbing a federal prison guard in the eye.

=== Blocked by Executive Order 13224 ===
On 12 October 2001 Kadi was listed as one of several dozen individuals that the United States "determined to have committed or to pose a significant risk of committing or providing material support for acts of terrorism" under Executive Order 13224. His U.S. assets were frozen. On 15 October, OFAC sent a letter to Kadi notifying him of his rights to request reconsideration. Kadi was added to the UN list shortly afterward, which also resulted in his assets being frozen in European Union countries. Saudi Arabia "supported the addition of the Jeddah-based terrorist financier, Yasin al-Qadi, to the UN's consolidated list in October 2001," according to an official press release of the U.S. Treasury.

=== "Not found guilty of anything" ===
Yassin Kadi was never formally charged with a crime by the U.S. Department of Treasury's Office of Foreign Assets Control. "As is customary in such cases, Washington has presented no direct evidence linking Mr. Kadi to terrorism," the New York Times reported in 2008. "But it has made public a dense labyrinth of associations and business and personal ties that it says establishes Mr. Kadi’s relationship with Mr. bin Laden and his allies."

"We have not found Mr. Kadi guilty of anything," Adam J. Szubin, director of OFAC, told the Times. "But we have found that he is a supporter of terror."

"The post-911 credo became one of pre-emption and acting on suspicion," says Marieke DeGoede in her 2012 book Speculative Security: The Politics of Pursuing Terrorist Monies. OFAC uses its new powers to freeze assets "during the pendancy of an investigation," which means, effectively, that the government is able to stop the operations of charities suspected of being terrorist fronts "without any formal determination of wrongdoing."

Kadi, who has repeatedly claimed that he has given no support to terrorism, told the Times that the result was a legal paradox. When no criminal charge has been brought and the evidence on which the charges are based has been classified, "there is no way to defend yourself."

Kadi denied all the allegations as totally untrue. "I don’t have any connection, be it close or distant, with Al-Qaeda or its leader Bin Laden, either directly or indirectly," he told Asharq Al-Awsat, a sister publication of Arab News, in an interview.

== Legal action ==
=== December 2001: Appeals listing and asset freeze ===
In December 2001, Kadi filed a challenge to the EU listing and asset freeze in the European Court of First Instance (General Court). His appeal was based on a claim that he had been denied fundamental due process. The same month, he also petitioned the U.S. Department of Treasury (OFAC) for reconsideration of his listing and asset freeze.

=== Move to Turkey ===
After 11 September 2001, Yassin Kadi moved many of his operations to Istanbul, Turkey and Switzerland. Forbes reported that Kadi is a friend of Turkish Prime Minister Recep Tayyip Erdogan. Erdogan is quoted as having said "I know Mr. Kadi. I believe in him as I believe in myself. For Mr. Kadi to associate with a terrorist organization, or support one, is impossible."

=== November 2002: Defendant in 9/11 lawsuit ===
On 15 August 2002, firefighters, rescue workers and more than 600 relatives of victims of the September 11 attacks filed a $116 trillion lawsuit against Osama bin Laden, the Saudi Bin Laden Group, three Saudi princes, the government of Sudan, seven international banks, eight Islamic foundations, charities and subsidiaries, and many other defendants. Kadi was added to the list of defendants on 22 November 2002, along with 50 more people and organizations, bringing the total number of defendants to 186. The amount of money sought was reduced to $1 trillion, but the number of plaintiffs soon increased to 2,500 after the suit was widely publicized. Technically, Kadi was part of the "Third Amended Complaint" in the case of Thomas E. Burnett, Sr., et al. v. Al Baraka Investment and Development Corporation, et al., originally filed in the District of Columbia.

Informally, the case is called the "911 Lawsuit," and it is a landmark case that has been examined in great detail by legal scholars. In 2005 the case was combined with several other lawsuits to become In re Terrorist Attacks on September 11, 2001, MDL 1570, filed in the Southern District of New York. The case grew to more than 6,500 plaintiffs, collectively called "9/11 Families United to Bankrupt Terrorism."

=== March 2004: Delisting request denied by OFAC ===
On 12 March 2004, OFAC issued a 20-page unclassified memorandum denying Kadi's request for reconsideration. It determined that Kadi played "a significant leadership role" in the Muwafaq ("Blessed Success") Foundation, as one of six trustees, and the others "delegated . . . the running and the operation of the Foundation" to Kadi, who "was the driving force behind the administration of the foundation." He "effectively conceded that he directly supervised the individual country offices." OFAC relied on Kadi's involvement in Muwafaq and, in particular, activities claimed to have occurred in Bosnia, Albania, Sudan and Pakistan, to conclude that "Kadi financially supported terrorist activities, primarily through Muwafaq, but also through other Kadi-owned entities." It considered Kadi's "relationship with and financial transfers to, designated terrorists Abdul Latif Saleh, Wa'el Julaidan, and Chariq Ayadi -- who were all involved in Muwafaq."

According to OFAC's findings, "Muwafaq gave logistical and financial support to Al-Gama'at Al-Islamiya, a mujahadin battalion in Bosnia that was designated as SGDT on October 31, 2001. The organization also transferred $500,000 to terrorist organizations in the Balkans in the mid-1990s." OFAC found that Muwafaq "was involved in arms trafficking from Albania to Bosnia," and concluded that "as of late 2001, Kadi had continued to finance institutions and organizations in the Balkans after Muwafaq had ceased operations there, including two entities that were designated as SDGTs in early 2002 -- the Revival of Islamic Heritage Society's Pakistan and Afghanistan offices, and the Bosnia-Herzegovina branch of the Al-Haramain Foundation."

=== September 2004: Complaint against Swiss prosecutor ===
On 21 September 2004, the Swiss Federal Criminal Court ruled in Kadi's favor with regard to complaints brought by Kadi's lawyers against the Swiss prosecutor, Deputy Swiss Attorney General Claude Nicati. The Swiss court ordered that Kadi's lawyers be given full access to Nicati's entire file, including all notes taken by Nicati of his meeting with Jean-Charles Brisard.

"Brisard is the lead investigator for the US lawyers in the civil action brought in the US courts on behalf of the families of the victims of the Sept. 11, 2001 attacks and cannot therefore be regarded as independent," his lawyers said. "Of particular concern to Al-Qadi was his discovery that Brisard passed to US lawyers documents he received from Nicati’s file in his capacity as expert."

On 27 March 2006, an extraordinary prosecutor appointed to investigate the matter concluded that Kadi's allegations were baseless and dismissed the action, finding that there was no evidence that Brisard or his assistants had improperly passed on information to Nicati.

=== September 2005: EU denies request for delisting ===
In September 2005, the EU Court of First Instance (General Court) denied Kadi's appeal, saying that compliance with EU law need not be considered because the UN Security Council has primacy. Kadi appealed to the EU Court of Justice.

=== December 2005: Wins case in Switzerland ===
The Federal Criminal Court in Berne, Switzerland, "cleared Al-Qadi of any wrongdoing in a case stemming from the 9/11 attacks," his lawyers announced on 12 December 2005. The charges had alleged that Kadi gave money in 1998 ostensibly to construct student housing at Al-Iman University in Yemen while knowing that the funds may have ended up supporting Al-Qaeda's plan to attack New York City.

"I am very happy to know that my friend Al-Qadi has been cleared of all charges by the Swiss court," Zuhair Fayez, a Jeddah-based architect, told Arab News on 25 December. He described Kadi as a reputable businessman and said the individuals and agencies that falsely accused Kadi of funding terrorism must be held responsible for damaging his reputation and interests.

=== December 2007: Delisted by Switzerland ===
On 13 December 2007, based on the results of its own six-year investigation, a Swiss court removed Kadi from the country's list of blocked terrorists. Arab News reported that Kadi was exonerated "on all charges" and said that his money in Swiss banks and the Geneva-based Faisal bank would be unfrozen. Switzerland is not a member of the European Union and therefore had no obligation to comply with the EU listing.

=== September 2008: EU Court of Justice rules in favor of Kadi ===
In 2008 the European Court of Justice overturned sanctions against Kadi by individual European Union governments, on the grounds the EU nations had not offered those sanctioned a chance for the judicial review of their matter.

On 3 September 2008, the EU Court of Justice (higher court) ruled in favor of Kadi, "saying UN agreements cannot have the effect of prejudicing constitutional principles agreed to in the treaty establishing the European Community. The court found the EU regulation allowing listing and asset freezes to breach fundamental human rights, since no evidence was communicated to Kadi, and the right of defence and effective judicial review were prejudiced. It gave EU authorities three months to remedy these defects, leaving the sanctions in place during that time."

According to Forbes magazine, none of the bodies that have sanctioned Kadi have made public any of the evidence upon which the sanctions were and continued to be based.

On 22 October 2008, Martin Scheinin, in a report to the United Nations Security Council, suggested greater openness and transparency for making known the reasons individuals and organizations were being sanctioned. He stated:

"Leaving things as they are at the U.N. level ... is the least preferred option, as it would result in a wave of litigation and the credibility of the overall United Nations counterterrorism framework would be at risk."

=== November 2008: EU Commission renews listing and asset freeze ===
In October 2008, the EU Commission (sanctions agency) provided to Kadi's attorneys a brief summary of the UN's reasons for listing Kadi, and they gave Kadi an opportunity for comment. On 28 November 2008, the EU Commission renewed its listing and assets freeze against Kadi.

=== December 2008: Partially delisted by UK Treasury ===
In December 2008, the UK Treasury removed Yassin Kadi from its list of persons designated as terrorists under its Terrorism (United Nations Measures) Order 2001 (the "2001 Order"), but left him on a second list of persons designated as terrorists under separate UK legislation, the Al Qaeda and Taliban (United Nations Measures) Order 2006 (the "2006 Order"), which contained different listing criteria.

According to his UK lawyers at Carter-Ruck, "this delisting followed a comprehensive review by the UK Treasury of the case against Mr. Kadi, including a review of the materials which had been used to support Mr. Kadi's original designation, after which the UK Treasury concluded that "the case against (Mr. Kadi) no longer meets the test set out in ... the Terrorism Order."

=== January 2009: Kadi v Timothy Geithner et al ===
On 16 January 2009, Kadi filed suit against officers of the U.S. Department of Treasury (OFAC) in the U.S. District Court for the District of Columbia (Yassin Abdullah Kadi v. Timothy Geithner et al., Civil Action No. 09-0108; and Kadi v. Paulson et al., a request for agency decision review assigned to Judge John D. Bates, Case 28–1331).

The lawsuit and request for agency review challenged Kadi's designation as a terrorist and the asset freeze. Kadi raised "constitutional claims regarding due process, free speech, and protection from unreasonable seizure of assets."

=== February 2009: Second challenge to EU listing and EU freeze ===
In February 2009, Kadi filed a new lawsuit with the EU General Court (formerly the Court of First Instance), challenging the EU's 28 November 2008 decision to renew his listing and assets freeze.

=== August 2009: UN clarifies reasons for listing Kadi ===
On 13 August 2009, the United Nations Security Council Committee concerning Al-Qaida and associated individuals and entities (the "Al-Qaida Sanctions Committee") posted additional information and a narrative summary of their reasons for listing Yasin Abdullah Ezzeddine Kadi. The reasons included:

- Kadi's acknowledgement of his role as founding trustee and director of the actions of the Muwafaq Foundation, a foundation which historically operated under the umbrella of the Makhtab al-Khidamat, an organization which was the predecessor of Al-Qaida and which was founded by Usama bin Ladin
- Kadi's decision in 1992 to hire Shafiq ben Mohamed ben Mohamed al-Ayadi as head the European offices of the Muwafaq Foundation
- The 1995 testimony of Talad Fuad Kassem, who said that the Muwafaq Foundation had provided logistical and financial support for a fighters' battalion in Bosnia and Herzegovina and that the Muwafaq Foundation was involved in providing financial support for terrorist activities of the fighters, as well as arms trafficking from Albania to Bosnia and Herzegovina
- Kadi's role as a major shareholder in the now closed Sarajevo-based Depositna Banka, where planning sessions for an attack against a United States facility in Saudi Arabia may have taken place
- Kadi's ownership of several firms in Albania which funneled money to extremists or employed extremists in positions where they controlled the firm's funds
- Evidence that Bin Laden provided the working capital for up to five of Kadi's companies in Albania.

Based on these reasons, the U.N. Security Council resolved to continue listing Yassin Kadi as a suspected supporter of al-Qaeda terrorists and the United States Department of Treasury has continued to classify Kadi as a Specially Designated Global Terrorist.

=== January 2010: UK Supreme Court delists Kadi ===
On 27 January 2010, the Supreme Court of the United Kingdom (the highest appellate court for the UK) annulled the listing criteria of "the 2006 Order," the Al Qaeda and Taliban (United Nations Measures) Order 2006. In the case of Her Majesty's Treasury v Ahmed the court struck down the operative part of the legislation, and ruled that it must be quashed as being ultra vires, or beyond the powers of the government which were conferred under the UK's United Nations Act 1946, which allowed the UK to implement UN Security Council Resolutions.

Thus Kadi's removal from a second UK list of persons designated as terrorists "was done as the result of the finding of the Supreme Court of the United Kingdom that any such designation (as was done in Mr. Kadi's case in contravention of his fundamental rights) was illegal."

=== September 2010: EU Court rules in Kadi’s favor, faults UN procedures ===
On 30 September 2010, the EU General Court once again ruled in favor of Kadi, "noting that the UN procedure, despite improvements in the establishment of an Ombudsman Office to make recommendations on delisting requests, lacks fundamental due process protections, including sufficient notice of the charges and denying 'most minimal access to the evidence against him.'" It said: "In essence the Security Council has still not deemed it appropriate to establish an independent and impartial body responsible for hearing ... decisions taken by the Sanctions Committee." (Paragraph 128).

According to Kadi's solicitors at Carter-Ruck, the ruling had the effect of striking down the European asset-freezing regulation that was imposed on Kadi on 28 November 2008 after he had won his appeal to the European Court of Justice.

=== 8 September 2011: Sued by Lloyd's ===
Kadi was among nine defendants sued by the Lloyd's of London insurance syndicate on 8 September 2011 in a "landmark legal case against Saudi Arabia, accusing the kingdom of indirectly funding al-Qa'ida and demanding the repayment of £136m [$215 million] it paid out to victims of the 9/11 attacks." Formally titled Underwriting Members of Lloyd's Syndicate 3500 v. Kingdom of Saudi Arabia et al., the civil suit was filed in Pittsburgh (the U.S. District Court for the Western District of Pennsylvania).

"Absent the sponsorship of al Qaeda’s material sponsors and supporters, including the defendants named herein, al Qaeda would not have possessed the capacity to conceive, plan and execute the September 11th attacks," according to the 154-page complaint.

Yassin Kadi is listed along with the following defendants:

- The Kingdom of Saudi Arabia (KSA)
- The Saudi High Commission for Relief of Bosnia and Herzegovina (SHCR)
- The Saudi Joint Relief Committee for Kosovo and Chechnya (SJRC)
- The Saudi Arabian Red Crescent Society (SRCS)
- The National Commercial Bank (NCB)
- The Al-Rajhi Bank and Investment Company (ARABIC)
- Prince Salman Bin Abdul-Aziz al Saud
- Sulaiman Abdul Aziz Al Rajhi (SAAR)

=== March 2012: U.S. Judge denies Kadi's motion to delist ===
On 19 March 2012, the U.S. District Court for the District of Columbia dismissed Kadi's 2009 lawsuit against the officers of the U.S. Department of Treasury (OFAC). Judge John D. Bates brushed off Kadi's claim that OFAC "simply ignored" his explanation that Muwafaq was an organization engaged in charitable activities. Kadi had said the government believes Muwafaq is a front for bin Laden because USA Today reported that. "To the extent Kadi contends that newspaper articles cannot be relied upon by the government at all, that proposition is not well-grounded," Bates wrote. "As already stated, reliance on hearsay is plainly allowed. Furthermore, reliance on newspaper articles has been permitted to 'fill in evidentiary gaps when there is corroboration,' as well as to provide background information", Bates explained in his judgement.

Bates stated "the Court finds that this claim must be dismissed because (1) the bill of attainder clause does not apply to acts taken by a regulatory agency and (2) even if it did, the clause is not triggered here, because there was no action constituting 'punishment'".

=== October 2012: UN Security Council delists Kadi ===
The U.N. Security Council created an independent ombudsman in 2009 to handle requests to get off the blacklist. The decision to delist Kadi came following his request for removal, according to a UN statement.

It stated that "after concluding its consideration of the delisting request submitted by this individual through the Ombudsperson established pursuant to Security Council resolution 1904 (2009), and after considering the Comprehensive Report of the Ombudsperson on this delisting request. Therefore, the assets freeze, travel ban and arms embargo set out in paragraph 1 of Security Council resolution 1989 (2011) no longer apply to the following individual."

=== July 2013: European Court of Justice upholds annulment of terrorism designation ===
The European Commission, the European Council, and the United Kingdom appealed against the 2010 ruling of the EU General Court which had struck down the freezing of Kadi's European assets. The Grand Chamber of the Court of Justice of the European Union declined the appeal. According to Maya Lester, the decision hinged upon the court having gone through "each reason for the decision to re-list Yassin Kadi in 2008, and Mr Kadi’s evidence in response, and found none of the reasons to have been substantiated with evidence". The court stated that "since no information or evidence has been produced to substantiate the allegations, roundly refuted by Mr. Al-Qadi, of his being involved in activities linked to international terrorism, those allegations are not such as to justify the adoption, at European Union level, of restrictive measures against him."

=== September 2014: US unblocks property and interests ===
On 11 September 2014, OFAC unblocked the property and interests in property of Yassin Kadi pursuant to E.O. 13224, "Blocking Property and Prohibiting Transactions With Persons Who Commit, Threaten To Commit, or Support Terrorism."

== Bibliography ==
Cited in Footnotes

- Blackburn, Chris "Jamaat-i-Islam: A Threat to Bangladesh?" Secular Voice of Bangladesh website
- Gerth, Jeff and Judith Miller, "On The List: Philanthropist or Fount of Funds for Terrorists?" New York Times, 13 October 2001
- Jackson, David et al. "U.S.: Money Trail Leads to Saudi," Chicago Tribune, 29 October 2001
- Johnson, Jeff "Whistleblower Complains of FBI Obstruction," CNS News, 30 May 2002, APFN.org website
- Morais, Richard C., and Denet C. Tezel (2008-01-24). "The Al Qadi Affair". Forbes magazine. Retrieved 2008-10-23. mirror
- Simpson, Glenn R. "Well Connected, A Saudi Mogul Skirts Sanctions," Wall Street Journal, 29 August 2007
- Thomas Jr., Landon "A Wealthy Saudi Mired in Limbo Over an Accusation of Terrorism," New York Times, 12 December 2008
- Who's Who in the Arab World: 1981-1982 (University of Michigan: Publitec, 1981) p. 820

Additional References

- Bascio, Patrick, Defeating Islamic Terrorism: An Alternative Strategy (Branden Books, 2007) p. 50-51
- Brisard, Jean-Charles and Guillaume Dasquié. Forbidden Truth: U.S.-Taliban Secret Oil Diplomacy and the Failed Hunt for Bin Laden (New York: Thunder's Mouth Press, 2002)
- Comras, Victor D. Flawed Diplomacy: The United Nations and the War on Terrorism

(Potomac Books Inc., 2010) p. 98

- DeGoede, Marieke. Speculative Security: The Politics of Pursuing Terrorist Monies

(University of Minnesota Press, 2012) p. 133 ff.

- Levitt, Matthew. Hamas: Politics, Charity, and Terrorism in the Service of Jihad (Yale

University Press, 2007), p. 168

- Posner, Gerald. Secrets of the Kingdom: The Inside Story of the Saudi-U.S. Connection (New York: Random House, 2005).
- Powis, Robert E. The Money Launderers. (Chicago: Probis Publishing Company, 1992).
- Randal, Jonathan. Osama: The Making of a Terrorist (New York: Vintage Books, 2004).
- Rubin, Barry. Guide to Islamist Movements (M.E. Sharpe, 2009). Vol. 1, p. 127
- Truell, Peter and Larry Gurwin. False Profits: The Inside Story of BCCI, The World's Most Corrupt Financial Empire (Boston and New York: Houghton Mifflin Co., 1992)
