= New Deal of the Mind =

British charitable organization

New Deal of the Mind (NDotM) is a charity that was established in 2009.

NDotM developed from an article published in the New Statesman in January 2009 by Martin Bright, the magazine's former political editor. In this piece, Bright suggested that cultural elements of the Works Progress Administration (WPA), part of US President Franklin D. Roosevelt's post-Great Depression New Deal, be adapted for the UK today. Bright listed the achievements of the WPA: 3,500 branch libraries created, 4,400 musical performances every month by the Federal Music Project, a collection of oral histories collated which featured the narratives of the last living slaves. He also cited some of WPA's beneficiaries: Jackson Pollock, Mark Rothko and Willem de Kooning and writers such as Saul Bellow, John Cheever and Ralph Ellison.

In an effort to devise plans for job creation in the creative sector, NDotM borrows and adapts elements from Roosevelt's original New Deal. NDotM are pushing for government policy that encourages self-employment and freelance opportunities—the lifeblood of the creative industries—such as the reintroduction of something similar to the Enterprise Allowance Scheme. Under Margaret Thatcher's government, long term unemployed people were offered £40 a week and free business advice while they set up a business. The EAS famously helped figures including Creation Records founder Alan McGee, Superdry's creator Julian Dunkerton and artists Tracey Emin and Jane and Louise Wilson.

New Deal of the Mind has successfully lobbied for the return of the Enterprise Allowance Scheme, and borrows and adapts from both the EAS and WPA to push for government policy that encourages self-employment and freelance opportunities – the lifeblood of the creative industries. We’re working with the Government to help put unemployed people into creative placements in arts and culture and we’re finding spaces across the UK which will become "incubator centres" providing space, support and advice for people setting up on their own.

NDotM are also working to create Future Jobs Fund Hubs and NDotM Pop-Up Centres across the UK. The Hubs offer paid employment opportunities in arts and heritage institutions. The NDotM Pop-Up Centres will be entrepreneurship incubators for creative people, providing space as well as career and business advice.

== Launch ==
New Deal of the Mind was launched 2012 at Number 11 Downing Street. The event, hosted by Chancellor Alistair Darling and Maggie Darling, attracted an array of cultural leaders, artists, designers, journalists, ministers and politicians. It was described by Lord Puttnam as a "remarkable moment in history".

Martin Bright said he was delighted by the support from entrepreneurs, people in the arts and politicians from all parties. "I think this just shows that in extraordinary times, we need to do extraordinary things. We couldn’t do that without the support of such people, all of whom care about and understand the immense part that arts and culture play in our economic, financial and social well being."

Speakers included:

- Right Hon Andy Burnham MP, then Secretary of State for Culture, Media and Sport
- Right Hon James Purnell MP, then Secretary of State for Work and Pensions
- Right Hon Ed Vaizey MP, Conservative Party Shadow Culture Minister
- Sir Christopher Frayling, Rector of Royal College of Art
- Lord David Puttnam, film producer
- Dame Jenny Abramsky, Chair of the Heritage Lottery Fund
- Jude Kelly OBE, artistic director of the Southbank Centre
- Mark Thompson, Director-General of the BBC
- Sir John Tusa, Chair of the University of the Arts London
- Roger Wright, Controller of BBC Radio 3, Director of the Proms

Its legal form was initially New Deal of the Mind Limited, which during 2013 closed down its website and became a dormant company. It was replaced by NDotM Limited.

== Areas of activity ==
=== Research and advocacy ===
If government policy hopes to address the needs of the creative sector and create jobs, it must consider the needs of the self-employed. It is estimated that 41% of people working in the creative sector are self-employed and Arts Council research shows that more than 70% of those working in its regularly funded organisations (RFOs) are employed on a freelance basis.

NDotM is pushing for government policy that encourages entrepreneurship in the creative industries such as the reintroduction of the Enterprise Allowance Scheme.

Additionally, NDotM is lobbying policy makers and arts institutions nationally and locally to raise awareness of the significant role creativity can play in economic recovery.

=== Pop-Up Centres ===
NDotM proposes re-opening some of the UK's thousands of abandoned commercial properties as cultural and artistic spaces. NDotM Pop-Up Centres will contain studio, rehearsal and gallery spaces for young artists and musicians and drop-in centres for designers. Uniquely, they will also provide employment and business advice for innovators and creative people in partnership with Jobcentre Plus and University Career Services.

=== Future Jobs Fund Hubs ===
NDotM Future Jobs Fund Hubs create internships, apprenticeships and jobs targeted at creative graduates and long-term unemployed young people (18–24 years) in larger arts and heritage institutions that act as "hubs." These placements are paid for by the recently created Future Jobs Fund, a fund of around £1 billion to support the creation of jobs for long term unemployed young people and others who face significant disadvantage in the labour market.

FJF placements seek to tackle the issues of youth unemployment in the arts head-on, and, as a corollary help with the cultural and racial diversity that can only enrichen this country's heritage.

== People ==
The range of expertise and experience of NDotM's board of trustees, advisers and patrons ensures that NDotM is steered by specialists and experts who have strong track records of success in the arts, business, government and cultural sectors.

=== Team ===
- Martin Bright, CEO
- Karen Freyer, Managing Director
- Marcus Mason, Programme Manager
- Mwila Mulenshi, Programme Assistant
- Jonny Mundey, Cultural Development Officer

=== Board of trustees ===
- Richard Greer (chair), contemporary art patron and chair of a collector's group working with University of the Arts London
- Dr. Catherine Fieschi, Director, Counterpoint
- Pippa Harris, one of the founders of Neal Street Productions, along with Sam Mendes and Caro Newling
- Jude Kelly OBE, artistic director, Southbank Centre
- Mike Smith, managing director, Columbia Records
- Sir John Tusa, chairman, Clore Leadership Programme and University of the Arts London

=== Advisory board ===
- Dame Jenny Abramsky, chair, Heritage Lottery Fund
- Roy Clare CBE, Chief Executive, Museums, Libraries and Archives Council
- Anthony Sargent, General Director, the Sage Gateshead
- Carole Souter, Chief Executive, Heritage Lottery Fund
- Karen Brookfield, deputy director (Policy & Strategy), Heritage Lottery Fund
- Sir Ronald Grierson, chairman, International Advisory Board, The Blackstone Group
- Sir Tony Hall, executive director, Royal Opera House
- Graham Sheffield, artistic director, Barbican
- David Kershaw, Chief Executive, M&C Saatchi
- Trevor Phillips, chairman, Equality and Human Rights Commission
- Paul Collard, Chief Executive, Creativity, Culture and Education England

=== Patrons ===
- David Lammy MP, Minister of State for Higher Education and Intellectual Property
- Baroness Estelle Morris, Former Education Secretary
