= Martin Scheinin =

Finnish professor of law

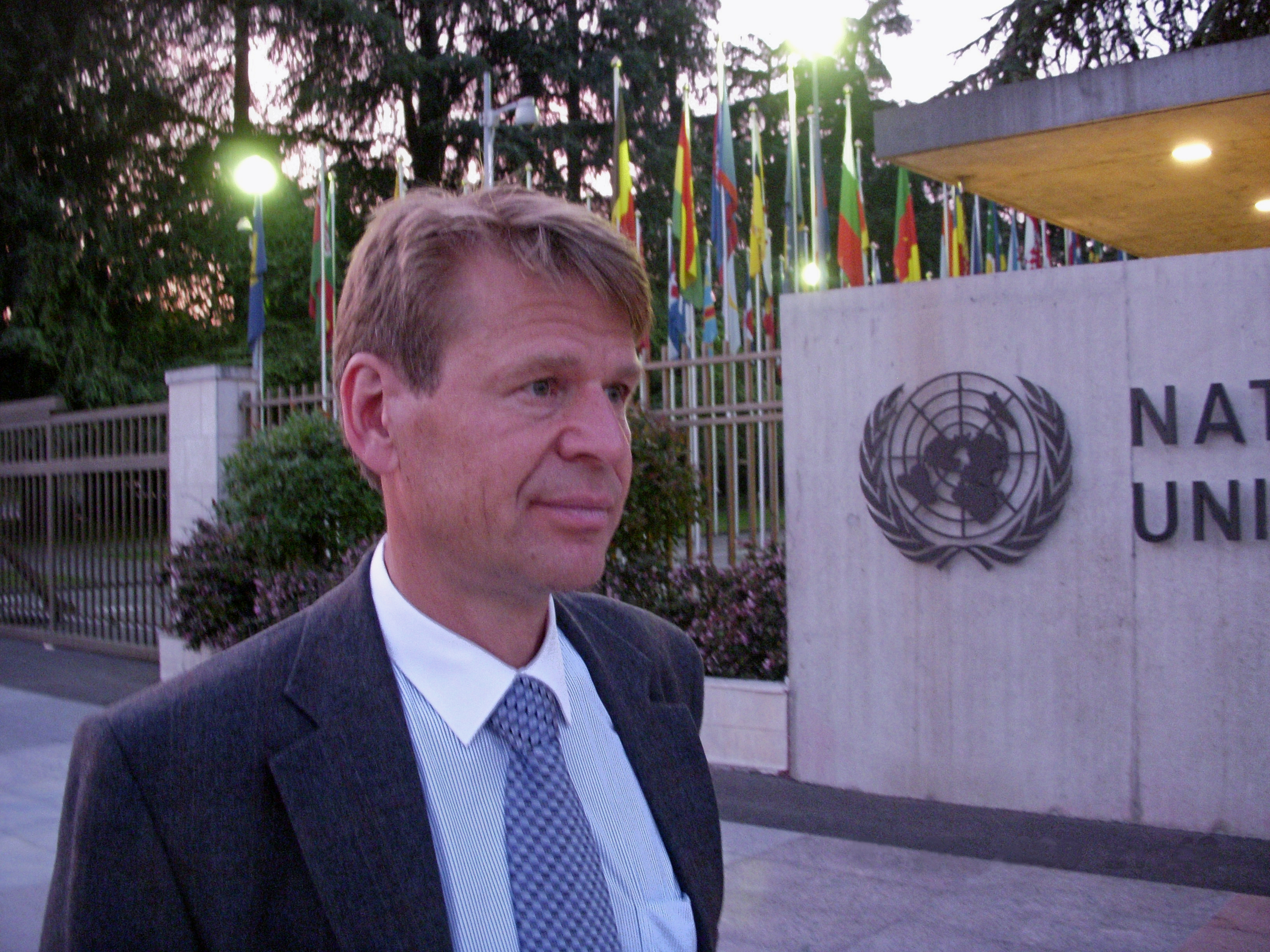
- Martin Scheinin in 2009

United Nations Special Rapporteur on Counter Terrorism and Human Rights
- In office 2005–2011
- Preceded by: Post created
- Succeeded by: Ben Emmerson

Personal details
- Born: 4 November 1954 Helsinki, Finland
- Education: University of Turku, Finland; University of Helsinki, Finland
- Occupation: Professor of International Law and Human Rights, European University Institute, Florence, Italy

Martin Scheinin (born 4 November 1954) is an international law scholar who served as the first United Nations Special Rapporteur on human rights and counter-terrorism in 2005–2011. He was selected for this position after serving for eight years (1997–2004) as member of the United Nations Human Rights Committee, the independent expert body monitoring states' compliance with the International Covenant on Civil and Political Rights. While on the committee, he was known as a defendant of the rights of minorities and indigenous peoples and opponent of capital punishment, as well as the drafter of the committee's General Comment No. 29 on states of emergency.

Today, he is Guest Professor at Lund University's Faculty of Law, and remains a part-time professor of International Law and Human Rights at the European University Institute in Florence, Italy. He is an expert of international law, human rights and constitutional law. From 2010 to 2014 Scheinin was President of the International Association of Constitutional Law. In 2018-2023 he was a member of the Scientific Committee of the EU Fundamental Rights Agency.

== Biography ==
Scheinin was born on 4 November 1954 in Helsinki, Finland to an accomplished upper-middle-class family. His father was dentistry professor and university rector Arje Scheinin. Although Scheinin received a Lutheran upbringing, his father's Jewish ancestry made him read books on the Holocaust and thus he became interested in human rights. In his youth he was an activist and involved in leftist politics. He was active in the 1970s student radicalism and involved in the Turun Akateeminen Sosialistiseura (Academic Socialist Association of Turku) In early 1980s he worked as lawyer of the parliamentary group of the Finnish People's Democratic League (SKDL), briefly also engaging with the Eurocommunist fraction of the deeply divided Communist Party of Finland. In an interview Scheinin claims that his interest in human rights partly stemmed from his background as a peace activist and partly from insights concerning the world of politics that he learned while working as a lawyer in the parliament building.

He has explained his conversion from a Euro-marxist to a liberal as learning by the mid-1980s that "liberty is a higher value than equality". He left party politics in the mid-1980s and has since focused on his legal and academic work. He was active in several non-governmental organisations, including Ihmisoikeusliitto (Finnish League for Human Rights) and Suomen Demokraattiset Lakimiehet DEMLA (Democratic Lawyers of Finland).

Scheinin received his law degrees at the Universities of Turku (LL.M. 1982, LL.L. 1987) and Helsinki (J.D. 1991). Scheinin's doctoral dissertation was titled "Ihmisoikeudet Suomen oikeudessa" (Human Rights in the Legal System of Finland) and had a transformative role in strengthening the country's commitment to international human rights and their constitutional protection.

Scheinin has defended Sami people's rights against mining and forestry activities, including in Angeli, Finland since the 1990s. He states that indigenous people's rights are close to his heart. In an interview, Scheinin considers his greatest achievement his contributions to the suspension of capital punishment in Russia.

Scheinin was awarded Amnesty International Finland's Candle Prize in 2011 for his long-term work for human rights, and more specifically for his work as a UN Special Rapporteur on human rights and counter-terrorism in 2005–2011.

== Academic career ==
Scheinin received his doctorate in law from the University of Helsinki in 1991. Scheinin was Professor of law for fifteen years in Finland, first as Professor of Constitutional Law at the University of Helsinki (1993–1998) and then as Professor of Constitutional and International Law and Director of the Institute for Human Rights at Åbo Akademi University (1998–2008). He moved to Florence in 2008 to take up office as Professor of Public International Law at the European University Institute.

At the European University Institute, Scheinin's areas of research and supervision have included human rights law, privacy and surveillance, rights of indigenous peoples, and anti-terrorism legislation. In 2016–2018 he served as the Dean of Graduate Studies in addition to his duties as professor. He was the Coordinator of the FP7-research project SURVEILLE (Surveillance: Ethical Issues, Legal Limitations, and Efficiency), and earlier the Work Package leader in the research project DETECTER (Detection Technologies, Terrorism, Ethics, and Human Rights) under the European Union Framework 7 Security Programme. He was also the coordinator of the research strand GLOTHRO (Beyond Territoriality: Globalisation and Transnational Human Rights Obligations) within the EUI Global Governance Programme.

His professional experience also includes working for the Parliament of Finland, the Finnish Ministry of Justice and three governmental commissions that drafted amendments to the Finnish Constitution, including the 1995 fundamental rights reform. He has taught courses on human rights or counter-terrorism in many parts of the world, including at the University of Melbourne, University of Pretoria, the American University Washington College of Law and the University of Toronto, and for professional target groups such as judges, lawyers or prosecutors in Egypt, Latvia, Turkey and the Russian Federation.

In 2010–2014 Scheinin was President of the International Association of Constitutional Law. From 2020 to early 2025, he was British Academy Global Professor at the Bonavero Institute of Human Rights at the University of Oxford, while maintaining the status of part-time professor at the European University Institute.

== Work with the UN ==
Scheinin has worked with the UN on human rights issues since 1997, first as a member of the United Nations Human Rights Committee, and from 2005 until 2011 as Special Rapporteur on human rights and counter-terrorism.

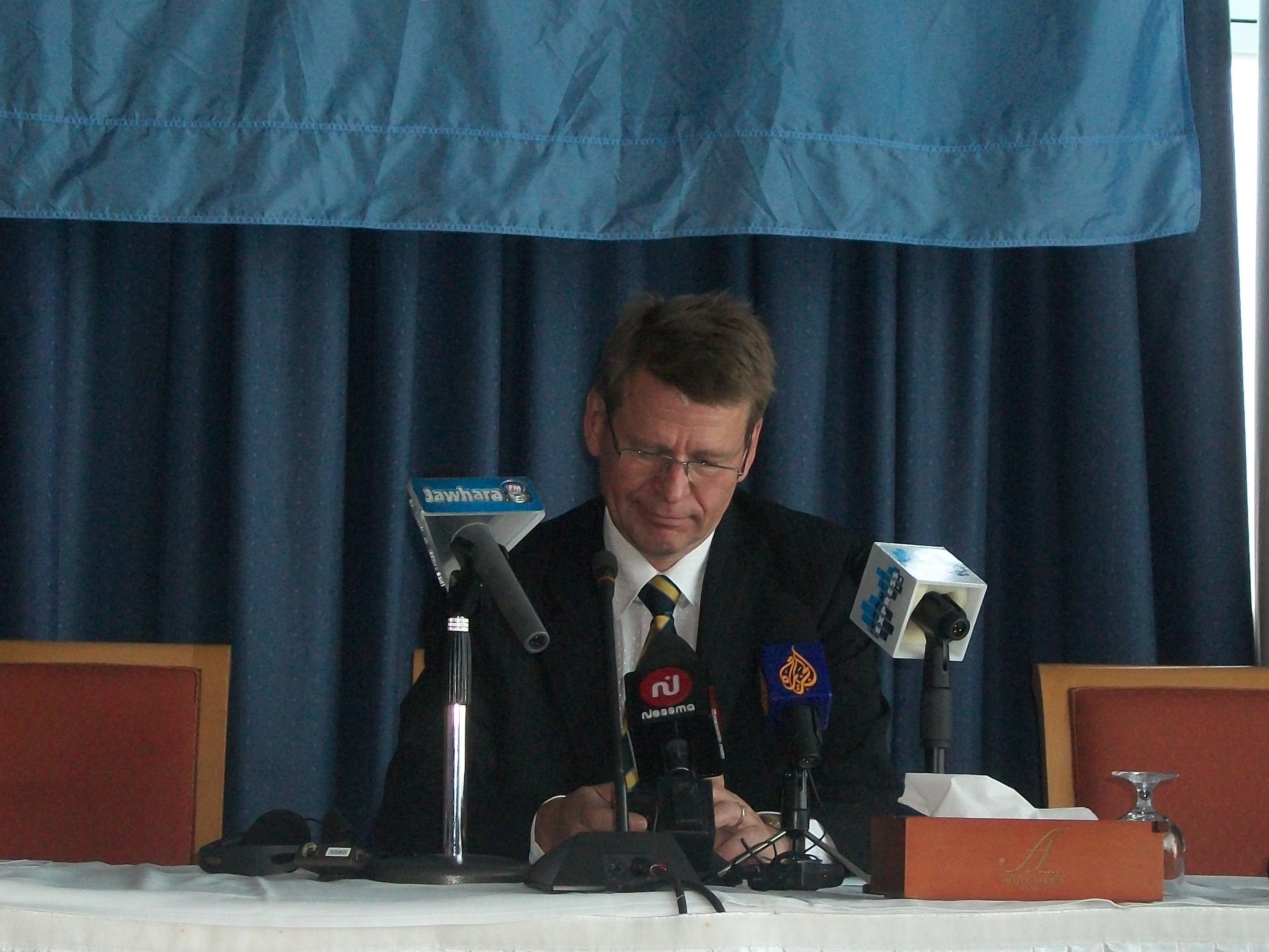
26 May 2011, Martin Scheinin urged Tunisia to continue reforms and investigate past human rights abuses.

In April 2005, the UN Commission on Human Rights appointed "a special rapporteur on the promotion and protection of human rights and fundamental freedoms while countering terrorism". This was initially a three-year appointment, to end in 2008, but was later extended by three more years, to end in 2011.

As Special Rapporteur on human rights and counter-terrorism, Scheinin reported annually both to the United Nations General Assembly and the United Nations Human Rights Council. His reports have covered themes such as definitions of terrorism, the right to fair trial in terrorism cases, the impact of counter-terrorism measures on economic, social and cultural rights, the right to privacy in the age of counter-terrorism, the role of intelligence agencies and their oversight in counter-terrorism, and the identification of best practice in combating terrorism in full compliance with human rights.

Some of the reports have been commended by governments, such as those related to discriminatory profiling or the right to privacy in the context of counter-terrorism. On some other occasions, certain governments have been highly critical about the reports, such as Scheinin's analysis of the [gender] impact of counter-terrorism measures and his proposals of a total reform of the terrorist listing by the United Nations Security Council. In a Fox News Channel interview, U.S. Senator Orrin Hatch called Scheinin and his colleague Christof Heyns "jerks" for sending a letter to the US government concerning the circumstances of the killing of Osama Bin Laden.

As Special Rapporteur, Scheinin was a member of the United Nations Counter-Terrorism Implementation Task Force (CTITF) and conducted a number of country visits to assess the counter-terrorism law and practice of countries such as Turkey, South Africa, United States, Israel, Spain, Egypt, Tunisia and Peru. As part of the country missions, he visited prisons and observed terrorism trials, such as the Military Commission hearings in the Salim Hamdan case in Guantanamo Bay and the Jose Padilla and Ahmed Ghailani trials in the United States. The country visits have often resulted in concrete improvements, such as the repeal of a contested Presidential Decree in Peru immediately after the visit in September 2010. As Special Rapporteurs can visit a country only upon the invitation of its government, Scheinin was not able to obtain access to countries such as Pakistan, the Philippines, or the Russian Federation.

Scheinin's mandate as Special Rapporteur on the promotion and protection of human rights and fundamental freedoms while countering terrorism ended on 31 July 2011. He was succeeded by Ben Emmerson, KC. (United Kingdom of Great Britain and Northern Ireland), who assumed this mandate on 1 August 2011.

== Other Activities ==
After his years as Special Rapporteur, Scheinin has remained active in issues concerning counter-terrorism and surveillance, as an academic, expert witness or in the media. His SURVEILLE project was endorsed in a resolution on mass surveillance adopted by the European Parliament in October 2015. He was heard as expert witness by the Tom Lantos Human Rights Commission of US Congress concerning human rights in the North Caucasus, by the Inter-American Court of Human Rights in the Mapuche case and by the Parliament of the United Kingdom in the consideration of the Investigatory Powers Bill. His work as Special Rapporteur has also been cited by the European Court of Human Rights and, in the Yassin Kadi case, by the European Court of Justice.

In 2015, when ten years had passed since his membership on the UN Human Rights Committee, Scheinin accepted again to serve as pro bono counsel for the indigenous Sami people. The first case was Tiina Sanila-Aikio (President of the Sami Parliament in Finland) v. Finland (Communication 2668/2015) related to state interference in the 2015 elections of the Sami Parliament. In its Final Views, the Human Rights Committee established a violation of ICCPR article 25 (rights of political participation), both read alone and in conjunction with article 27 (rights of minorities), as interpreted in the light of article 1 (peoples' right to self-determination). The general significance of the case is in its operationalisation of the right of indigenous peoples to self-determination not only as an interpretive principle but also as a justiciable right of "internal self-determination". Scheinin remains involved litigation before United Nations human rights treaty bodies concerning indigenous peoples' rights, including in cases related to climate change. In 2024, both the Committee on the Rights of the Child in M.E.V. et al. v. Finland (Communication 172/2022) and the Committee on Economic, Social and Cultural Rights in J.T. et al. v. Finland (Communications 251/2022 and 289/2022) established violations of the rights of the indigenous Sami through Finland's application of its Mining Act on Sami reindeer herding lands.

From 2018 to 2023, Scheinin served as a member of the Scientific Committee of the EU Fundamental Rights Agency, its main quality assurance body.

== Selected publications ==
- Scheinin, Martin (ed.), Human rights norms in 'other' international courts : part of studies on international courts and tribunals, Cambridge : Cambridge University Press, 2019
- Scheinin, Martin, Krunke, Helle, Aksenova, Marina (eds.), Judges as guardians of constitutionalism and human rights, Cheltenham; Northampton : Edward Elgar Publishing, 2016
- Krause, Catarina, Scheinin, Martin (eds.), International Protection of Human Rights: A textbook (2nd, rev. ed), Turku/Åbo, Åbo Akademi University Institute for Human Rights, 2012
- Kozma, Julia, Nowak, Manfred, Scheinin, Martin, A World Court of Human Rights : Consolidated statute and commentary, Vienna/Graz, Neuer Wissenschaftlicher Verlag, 2010
- Menno Kamminga and Martin Scheinin (eds.): The Impact of Human Rights Law on General International Law. Oxford University Press 2009
