= Peter Beaumont (journalist) =

British journalist

Peter Beaumont (born 28 November 1961 in Bishops Stortford) is a British journalist who is the foreign affairs editor of The Observer as well as writing for its sister paper, The Guardian. He has covered wars in Iraq, Afghanistan, Lebanon, Palestine, and Kosovo.

Beaumont is the author of The Secret Life of War – Journeys Through Modern Conflict (2009), a memoir of his life as a foreign correspondent working in war zones.

He was played by Matthew Goode in the film Official Secrets (2019).

== Awards ==
- Amnesty National Press Award 2006
- Orwell Prize 2007
- Webby Award 2011
