= Official Secrets =

- Theatrical release poster
- Directed by: Gavin Hood
- Screenplay by: Gregory Bernstein; Sara Bernstein; Gavin Hood
- Based on: The Spy Who Tried to Stop a War by Marcia & Thomas Mitchell
- Produced by: Ged Doherty; Elizabeth Fowler; Melissa Shiyu Zuo
- Starring: Keira Knightley; Matt Smith; Matthew Goode; Rhys Ifans; Adam Bakri; Ralph Fiennes
- Cinematography: Florian Hoffmeister
- Edited by: Megan Gill
- Music by: Paul Hepker; Mark Kilian
- Production companies: Clear Pictures Entertainment; Raindog Films; The Gordon Company; Ingenious Media; Screen Yorkshire
- Distributed by: Entertainment One (United Kingdom); IFC Films (United States)
- Release dates: 28 January 2019 (Sundance); 30 August 2019 (United States); 18 October 2019 (United Kingdom)
- Running time: 112 minutes
- Countries: United Kingdom; United States
- Language: English
- Box office: $10.1 million

Official Secrets is a 2019 British drama film directed by Gavin Hood, based on the case of whistleblower Katharine Gun, who exposed an illegal spying operation by American and British intelligence services to gauge sentiment of and potentially blackmail United Nations diplomats tasked to vote on a resolution regarding the 2003 invasion of Iraq. Keira Knightley stars as Gun, alongside Matt Smith, Matthew Goode, Adam Bakri, Indira Varma and Ralph Fiennes.

The film had its world premiere at the Sundance Film Festival on 28 January 2019 and was released in the United States on 30 August 2019, by IFC Films, and in the United Kingdom on 18 October 2019, by Entertainment One.

== Plot ==
In early 2003, GCHQ analyst Katharine Gun obtains a memo detailing a joint United States and British operation to spy on diplomats from several non–permanent United Nations Security Council member states (Cameroon, Chile, Bulgaria and Guinea), to "dig dirt" on them. This was to influence the Security Council into passing a resolution supporting an invasion of Iraq.

Angered that the UK is being led into a war on false pretences, Katharine leaks the memo to a friend involved in the anti-war movement, who passes it to anti-war activist Yvonne Ridley. She gets it to The Observer journalist Martin Bright.

The Observer foreign editor Peter Beaumont allows Martin to investigate the story. To verify the memo's authenticity, Martin enlists the help of the Observer's Washington correspondent Ed Vulliamy to contact the memo's author Frank Koza, Chief of Staff at the "regional targets" section of the NSA. Despite the Observer's pro-war stance, Peter convinces the chief editor Roger Alton that the leaked memo is worth publishing.

The leaked memo's publication in March 2003 generates public and media interest. The Drudge Report attempts to discredit the document as a fake, as staffer Nicole Mowbray had inadvertently changed the text from American to British English with a spellchecker. However, Martin is able to produce the original memo, confirming its authenticity.

Katharine's actions prompt GCHQ to launch an internal investigation. Seeking to prevent an invasion of Iraq and to protect her colleagues from suspicion, Katharine confesses to the leak. She is arrested, questioned, then released on bail.

Following the outbreak of the Iraq War, Katharine seeks the services of the Liberty lawyers Ben Emmerson and Shami Chakrabarti. The British Government decides to charge her with violating the Official Secrets Act, tasking the Director of Public Prosecutions, Ken Macdonald, with the prosecution.

To exert pressure, the British authorities attempt to deport her husband Yasar Gun, a Turkish Kurd. However, Katharine is able to halt the deportation with the help of her MP, Nigel Jones.

Katharine's defence strategy is that she acted from loyalty to her country, seeking to prevent it from being led into an unlawful war. With the help of Martin, Ed, and former Foreign Office deputy legal adviser Elizabeth Wilmshurst, Ben discovers that the Attorney General Peter Goldsmith changed his position on the legality of the war after meeting lawyers from the Bush Administration. Despite the odds against her, Katharine refuses to plead guilty in exchange for a reduced charge.

In court, the Crown prosecutor offers no evidence against Katharine. Ben responds that this is because doing so would have shown that the Blair government led the UK into war on false pretences.

The film then mentions the human toll of the Iraq War and that Lord Goldsmith's advice on the illegality of the Iraq War was made public in 2010. It ends with footage of the real Katharine addressing the media following the dismissal of her case, and Ben shunning Ken for putting Katharine through the ordeal "to make an example of her".

== Cast ==
- Keira Knightley as Katharine Gun
- Matt Smith as Martin Bright
- Matthew Goode as Peter Beaumont
- Rhys Ifans as Ed Vulliamy
- Adam Bakri as Yasar Gun
- Indira Varma as Shami Chakrabarti
- Ralph Fiennes as Ben Emmerson
- Conleth Hill as Roger Alton
- Tamsin Greig as Elizabeth Wilmshurst
- Hattie Morahan as Yvonne Ridley
- Ray Panthaki as Kamal Ahmed
- Angus Wright as Mark Ellison
- Chris Larkin as Nigel Jones
- Monica Dolan as Fiona Bygate
- Jack Farthing as Andy Dumfries
- Clive Francis as Admiral Nick Wilkinson
- Katherine Kelly as Jacqueline / MI6 Agent
- John Heffernan as James Welch
- Kenneth Cranham as Judge Hyam
- Darrell D'Silva as Chilean Ambassador
- Janie Dee as Jan Clements
- MyAnna Buring as Jasmine
- Niccy Lin as Mi-Yung
- Chris Reilly as Jerry
- Shaun Dooley as John
- Peter Guinness as TinTin
- Hanako Footman as Nicole Mowbray
- Jeremy Northam as Ken Macdonald

Martin Bright has a cameo role as an unnamed journalist.

== Production ==
Sara and Gregory Bernstein had already written a script by 2008. Eventually it found itself on The Black List, a list of "most liked" screenplays that have not yet been produced, where director Debs Paterson saw it. Still, nothing came of it until January 2016, when a filming start in May was announced, with Harrison Ford, Anthony Hopkins, Paul Bettany, Natalie Dormer and Martin Freeman cast. Tahar Rahim and Gillian Anderson were cast during the 2016 Berlin International Film Festival. However by June 2017, filming had yet to begin, and cast member Anderson stated she had not heard anything about the project since being cast.

By January 2018, the project was redeveloped once more, with Gavin Hood now set to direct in place of Justin Chadwick, and Keira Knightley and Matt Smith cast in February, replacing the previous cast. In March, Ralph Fiennes and Matthew Goode joined the cast, with filming beginning on 12 March 2018 in Yorkshire. Filming took place in the village of Boston Spa on 14 March. Indira Varma, Conleth Hill and Tamsin Greig joined the cast the next day. Filming had moved to Manchester by 19 March, serving as a stand-in for London. Filming was undertaken in April 2018 in Liverpool's St George's Hall.

The beach scenes featuring Emmerson and Macdonald were filmed at Thurstaston beach on the Wirral peninsula side of the Dee Estuary and prominently show the cottage known locally as Sally's Cottage.

== Release ==
The film had its world premiere at the Sundance Film Festival on 28 January 2019. Shortly after, IFC Films acquired US distribution rights to the film for "just under $2 million". It was released in the United States on 30 August 2019. It was previously scheduled to be released on 23 August 2019. and in the United Kingdom on 18 October 2019.

== Reception ==
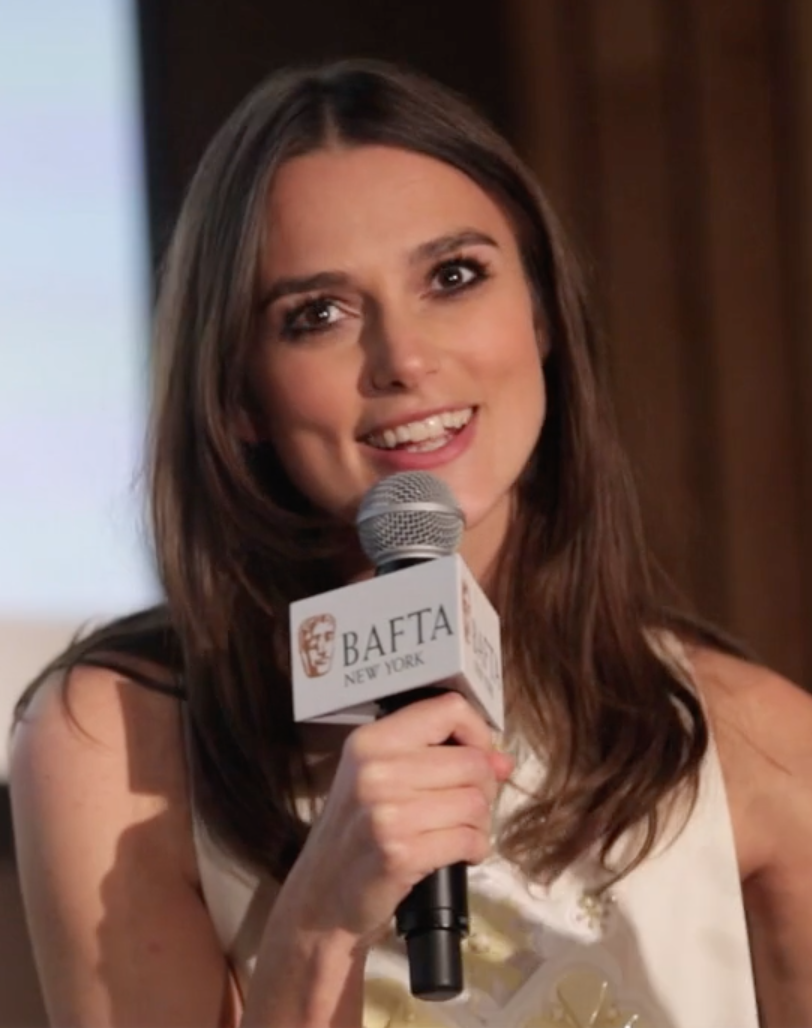
Keira Knightley's performance garnered critical acclaim.

On review aggregator website Rotten Tomatoes, the film holds an approval rating of 82% based on 166 reviews, with an average rating of 6.9/10. The website's critics consensus reads, "Official Secrets has a familiar structure and an obvious if worthy message, but rises on the strength of Keira Knightley's powerful performance." On Metacritic, the film holds 63 out of a 100 based on 28 reviews, indicating "generally favorable reviews".

In an article about the film and Katharine Gun, Sam Husseini wrote that "having followed this story from the start, I find this film to be, by Hollywood standards, a remarkably accurate account of what has happened to date—'to date' because the wider story still isn't really over".

== Accolades ==
Award	Year	Category	Recipient	Result	Ref(s)
Saturn Awards	26 October 2021	Best International Film	Official Secrets	Nominated	
