= The Wild (TV series) =

South African television soap

- Created by: Rohan Dickson; Richard Nosworthy; Bronwyn Berry
- Written by: Iain Paton; David Gordon; Julie Barker; Salah Sabiti; Carmen Sangion
- Directed by: Lungelo Sithebo; Katherine Cookie
- Starring: Zolisa Xaluva; Minnie Dlamini; Ian Roberts; Tumisho Masha; Shona Ferguson; Michelle Bradshaw; Hayley Owen; Connie Ferguson; Gail Nkoane; Faye Peters; Melusi Yeni; Khabonina Qubeka; John Kani
- Theme music composer: It Sounds Like This
- Composer: Joel Assaizky
- Country of origin: South Africa
- No. of seasons: 2
- No. of episodes: 416

Production
- Executive producers: Rohan Dickson; Richard Nosworthy; Bronwyn Berry
- Production locations: South Africa, North West
- Running time: 22-26 minutes

Original release
- Network: M-Net
- Release: 4 April 2011 – 28 March 2013

Related
- Legacy

The Wild is a South African television drama series created and executive produced by Rohan Dickson, Richard Nosworthy and Bronwyn Berry. It is an M-Net original series produced for M-Net by its in-house production company Magic Factory, and stars Shona Ferguson, Connie Ferguson, Tumisho Masha, Gail Mabalane, Ian Roberts, James Alexander, Tyrone Keogh and Clementine Mosimane, amongst others.

== Cast ==
Actor	Role
Connie Masilo	Marang Lebone
Shona Ferguson	Itumeleng Tladi
Tumisho Masha	Alfred Lebone
Gail Nkoane	Nompumelelo Lebone
Minnie Dlamini	Zintle Lebone
Khabonina Qubeka	Maxine Khumalo
Zakeeya Patel	Anita Khan
Lele Ledwaba	Dobsie
Putla Sehlapelo	Tiro Lebone
Tyrone Keogh	Jack Van Reean
Melusi Yeni	Isaac Tladi
Hayley Owens	Angie Palmer
Clementine Mosimane	Mme Rose Tladi
John Kani	Mr Mogomotsi
Michelle Bradshaw	Lindsley
Faye Peters	Nina
Ian Roberts	Karen Palmer
Aubrey Poo	Mr Mayor

== Broadcast ==
Before its television debut, M-Net held a red-carpet event on the 3rd of April 2011 at Montecasino, previewing the first four episodes of the series.

The series premiered on M-Net on 4 April 2011, airing four days a week. The series was rerun on M-Net's sister channels Mzansi Magic on 2 April 2012, Mzansi Wethu on 12 May 2013, and on M-Net Family on 2 July 2015. The series was later added to streaming service Showmax. The series was also shown on e.tv and eExtra in 2019.

== Awards and nominations ==
List of awards and nominations received by The Wild and cast members
Year	Award ceremony	Category	Recipient/Nominated work	Results	Ref.
2014	South African Film and Television Awards	Best Editor in a TV Soap	Editing Team	Won	
2014	South African Film and Television Awards	Best Art Direction in a TV Soap	Annerie Gericke	Won	
2014	South African Film and Television Awards	Best DOP / Cinematographer of a TV Soap	The Wild	Won	
