= Dineo Langa =

South African actress and businesswoman

- Born: Dineo Bridgette Moeketsi; 20 July 1987 (age 39); Johannesburg, South Africa
- Education: New York Film Academy
- Occupations: Actress; businesswoman; media personality
- Known for: The Queen as Keabetswe 'Kea' Khoza
- Notable work: The Queen
- Title: Mrs
- Spouse: Zothile Langa (m. 2019)
- Mother: Kgomotso Moeketsi
- Website: www.dineolanga.com.za

Dineo Bridgette Moeketsi Langa (née Moeketsi; born 20 July 1987) is a South African actress, businesswoman and media personality. She is well known for her main role as Kea Khoza on Mzansi Magic telenovela The Queen.

== Career ==
Dineo Langa has appeared in numerous TV shows including playing Naledi Thebe on E.tv's Scandal!, playing Kea Khoza on Mzansi Magic's The Queen opposite Connie Ferguson, Shona Ferguson and Themba Ndaba and portraying Mmakoena Molefe on SABC 3 new telenovela The Estate.

In 2020, during lockdown, Langa hosted the South African Music Awards with co-host Donovan Goliath which were held virtual and had five airing episodes. In 2021, Langa hosted the South African Film & Television Awards.

== Personal life ==
Dineo is daughter of South African Radio Personality KG Moekesti formerly Kgomotso Moeketsi. She is married to South African rapper "Solo", formerly Ntsizwa Solo Langa kaMthimkhulu.

== Filmography ==
=== Film ===
| Year | Title | Role |
|---|---|---|
| 2018 | Mrs Right Guy | Thando |
| 2024 | Losing Lerato 2 | Cleo Joyce |
| 2024 | A Westley South African Christmas | Lerato Dlamini |

Television

| Year | Film | Role |
|---|---|---|
| (2013–2016) | Scandal! | Naledi Thebe |
| (2016– 2020) | The Queen | Keabetswe Khoza |
| (2020) | 2020 SAMA AWARDS | Host/Herself |
| (2021–2022) | The Estate | Mmakoena Molefe |
| (2021) | SAFTA 2021 | Host/Herself |
| 2023 | Unseen (Netflix Series) | Naledi |
