= Sthembiso Khoza =

South African actor (born 1986)

- Born: Sthembiso Khoza; July 1, 1986 (age 40); KwaZulu Natal,South Africa
- Other name: SK Khoza
- Citizenship: South Africa
- Occupation: •actor •presenter •adult actor (former)
- Years active: 2014-present
- Known for: Shaka Khoza on The Queen
- Notable work: The Queen
- Partner: Ayanda Hlongwane (separated)
- Relatives: Abdul Khoza(brother)

Sthembiso Khoza (born 1 July 1986) also known as "Sk Khoza" or "Sthembiso SK" is a South African actor and presenter widely known for his breakthrough role as Shaka Khoza on Mzansi Magic's telenovela The Queen.

== Early life and career ==
Khoza was born and raised in KwaZulu Natal, South Africa and is of Zulu descent. He is the brother of Isibaya famed actor Abdul

In 2014 Khoza was cast as the host of Mzansi Riders before being cast as the recurring characters of DJ Teeman on Mzansi Magic's telenovela iNkaba alongside John Kani and Baby Cele. The following year saw Khoza rise on many screens as he was seen on shows like Mzansi Love- Kasi Style season 2 portraying Sihle, The Road alongside Nandi Madida and hosting a new show Bounce. He continued his flourishing in television fame until his 2016 breakthrough role as Shaka Khoza on The Queen alongside Connie Ferguson, Themba Ndaba and Marah Louw amongst others. His other television appearances include Kings of Jo'Burg, Ayeye: Stripped, and The Black Door. In 2026 Khoza reprised his role as Sabelo Cele on the spinoff telenovela Isitha: The Enemy reference this to his return to television.

== Public image ==
Khoza has been making waves on the news and everywhere since been dubbed as the Most Wanted Controversial Actor. In 2019 Khoza was fired from the hit telenovela The Queen after allegations of physical abuse started airing around accused by his then girlfriend. As per code of conduct Mzansi Magic and Ferguson Films removed him from the production stating that they do not condone any type of abuse especially Genders Based Violence. Despite the much Controversy around his personal life, viewers of the show felt like his personal life should not affect his work and a petition was signed over 26,000 people.

In 2022 the actor made headlines when a video of him attacking a fan started circulating around the socials. Disturbed viewers called for his cancellation. Not long after a sextape of the actor started circulating around and his response to the video the actor said he is very aware of the video and is not ashamed of it. He went on to announce that he will be starting an OnlyFans account after realising how big the video went in terms of number views.

== Personal life ==
Khoza was reportedly sharing a custody of his sons with Media personality and traditional doctor Gogo Maweni. The actor was engaged to his girlfriend Ayanda Hlongwane in 2020 before calling it a quits and revealing that his fiancée was physically abusive. In 2021 rumours of his friendship to fellow actor Moshe Ndike was questioned after the two were reportedly sported getting cosy numerous times.

== Filmography ==
=== Film ===
Year	Film	Role
2016	Baby Mama's	Tumi
2019	Zulu Wedding	Shoba

=== Television ===
Year	Title	Role
2014- 2015	iNkabi	DJ Teeman
2015	Ayeye	Neo
2015-2016	The Road	Sam Thabethe
2015	Isibaya	Thabiso
2016	Kingdom :Ukhakhayi	Madoda
2016–2019; 2020–2022	The Queen	Shaka Khoza
2022	Ayeye: Stripped	Neo
2020–present	Kings of Jo'burg	Cyrus
2022	Housekeepers	Sydney Ngubane
2022-2023	The Black Door	Sabelo Cele/Bafana Mabuza
2026–present	Isitha: The Enemy	Sabelo Cele/Bafana Mabuza
2026	Umthetho	Zola

== External references ==
- Sthembiso Khoza at IMDb
- Sthembiso Khoza at TVSA
- Sthembiso Khoza on Instagram
