= Zenande Mfenyana =

South African actress (born 1985)

- Born: Zenande Feziwe Mfenyana; 11 October 1985 (age 41); Kagiso, Gauteng
- Education: Queenstown Girls' High School; University of Pretoria
- Occupation: Actress
- Years active: 2006–present
- Notable work: Generations; The Queen; Inimba
- Children: 1
- Relatives: Akhenime Mfenyana (sister)

Zenande Mfenyana (born 11 October 1985) is a South African model and actress. She is known for portraying Noluntu Memela on SABC 1's Generations.

== Early life and education ==
Mfenyana was born in 1985 in Johannesburg, then moved to the Eastern Cape in Queenstown where she completed her matric at Queenstown Girls' High School. She was enrolled at the University of Pretoria and holds a BA in Drama.

== Career ==
Mfenyana came into the spotlight in August 2011 where she starred on Mfundi Vundla's SABC 1's soap opera Generations. She portrayed the role of Noluntu Memela, the daughter of Mawande Memela, until she was fired in August 2014 due to a strike that featured 15 of the cast members, including Connie Ferguson (Karabo Moroka), Sophie Ndaba (Queen Moroka) and Nambitha Mpumlwana (Mawande Memela).

In January 2015, Mfenyana starred as Reba on e.tv's soap opera Ashes to Ashes, alongside Tina Jaxa and Menzi Ngubane.

Mfenyana then played the main role of Babalwa on seasons one and two of the Ferguson Films' Mzansi Magic's Xhosa drama series Igazi, alongside Vatiswa Ndara, Jet Novuka and the late Nomhle Nkonyeni.

As of February 2017, she plays the main role of Goodness Mabuza on the Ferguson Films' Mzansi Magic series The Queen, alongside its producers Shona and Connie Ferguson.

== Filmography ==
Year	Title	Role	Note
2011-2014	Generations	Noluntu Memela	
2015-2016	Ashes to Ashes	Reba Namane	
	Igazi	Babalwa	
	MTV Shuga (Down South)	Cynthia Vilakazi	
2017–2022	The Queen	Goodness Mabuza	
2025-2026	Inimba season 1 and season 2	Thumeka Mabandla	

== Achievements ==
=== South African Film and Television Awards ===
Year	Nominee / work	Award	Result	Ref.
2026	Herself	Best Supporting Actress	Won	
