= Nomsa Buthelezi =

South African actress and television presenter

- Born: Nomsa Buthelezi; 7 April 1982 (age 44); Gauteng, South Africa
- Education: COSAC drama academy
- Occupation: Director
- Years active: 1990–present
- Television: The Queen (South African TV series)
- Spouse: Zandile Shezi (m. 2019)
- Children: 2

Nomsa Buthelezi-Shezi (born 7 April 1982) is a South African actress and television presenter. She is best known for the roles in the television serials such as; Abo Mzala, Isibaya, Lockdown and The Queen (South African TV series).

== Personal life ==
Buthelezi was born on 7 April 1982 in Alexandra, Gauteng, South Africa to Vezi and Magdalene. She has 2 brothers: Moses and Tony. Moses died in July 2021. She completed her primary education in her hometown, and later completed high school education at the age of 16. She then went on to complete a two-year course at the COSAC drama academy.

She dated Unathi Ndondzwana, who died after suffering a stroke in 2013. She is openly lesbian and is married to her longtime partner, Zandile Shezi. They got married on 28 September 2019, at a ceremony held in Alexandra, Johannesburg. She has two children.

== Career ==
Before entering to television, she had a 17 long career in theatre. In 2008, she played the role of a female "Metro police officer" in the Vodacom "Summer Loving" commercial until 2009. In 2011, she joined with the SABC1 sitcom Abo Mzala and played the role "Thandi" until the end of third season. She later won the award for the Best Supporting Actress in TV Comedy category at the South African Film and Television Awards (SAFTA). Then in 2013, she appeared in the Mzansi Magic sitcom Samsokolo with the role "Dudu". In the following year, she acted in the Vuzu sitcom Check Coast. Then she played the role "Awelani" in the soapie Muvhango.

In 2013, she joined with the season one of Mzansi Magic soap opera Isibaya where she played role of "Ma Mnisi". The role became very popular, where she continued to play the role for seven consecutive years until 2020. In the meantime in 2017, she became the presenter on Our Perfect Wedding from Season 7 to season 11. Meanwhile, in the same year, she played the role "Slender" in the Mzansi Magic prison drama Lockdown until 2019. After that serial, she joined with popular SABC1 soap opera Generations: The Legacy, where she played the role "Boipelo". In 2014, she was nominated for the Best Supporting Actress in TV Comedy category for her role in the serial Check Coast at the SAFTA. Apart from television, she also acted in the films: For Love and Broken Bones and The Adventures of Supermama. In 2019, she co-hosted the show "Fragrance Your Life" with Thembsie Matu aired on e.tv.

== Filmography ==
Year	Film	Role	Genre	Ref.
2011	Abo Mzala	Thandi	TV series	
2011	The Mating Game	Mean Prisoner	TV series	
2012	Jacob's Cross	Tumi	TV series	
2013	Isibaya	Ma Mnisi	TV series	
2013	Samsokolo	Duduzile "Dudu" Radebe	TV series	
2014	Check-Coast	Honesty Malovha	TV series	
2015	Gauteng Maboneng	Gladys	TV series	
2015	Thandeka's Diary	Candidate Tiny	TV series	
2016	For Love and Broken Bones	Estelle	Film	
2017	Lockdown	Slender	TV series	
2017	Muvhango	Awelani	TV series	
2018	The River	Wedding Planner	TV series	
2019;2022	Generations	Boipelo	TV series	
2021	The Adventures Of SuperMaMa	Doris	TV short supernatural film	
2022	The Queen	MaJali Khoza	Telenovela	
2025–Present	Black Gold	Brenda MaBrr Mthethwa	Telenovela	
