= Sello Maake Ka-Ncube =

South African actor (born 1960)

Sello Maake kaNcube
- Born: 12 March 1960 (age 66); Orlando, Soweto, South Africa
- Education: University of Leeds
- Occupations: Actor, Playwright, Director, Producer, Motivational Speaker, Mentor and Gender-based violence activist
- Years active: 1981–present
- Television: The Queen (2016–2017) as Fix and Executive Producer The Queen (2016–2017) as Kgosietsile Mathapelo: Generations (1993–2002) as Archie Moroka; Scandal! (2007–2016) as Lucas "Daniel" Nyathi; Rockville as Rolex Ngidi (2016)
- Spouse: Pearl Mbewe-Maake kaNcube
- Website: www.sellomaakekancube.co.za

Sello Maake kaNcube (born 12 March 1960) is a South African actor, director, producer and playwright. He has worked in his native land as well as the United States, United Kingdom, Canada and Europe.

== Work ==
=== Television ===
In his native country South Africa, Sello Maake kaNcube is best known for his leading roles in the long-running soap opera Generations as Archie Moroka and on the ETV soap opera Scandal! as a villainous character called Lucas "Daniel" Nyathi. He also starred as the flamboyant Kgosietsile in Mzansi Magic's telenovela The Queen.
