= Thembsie Matu =

South African actress

- Born: Nomathemba Matu; 1966 (age 58–59); Gauteng, South Africa
- Other names: Thembisile Matu
- Occupation(s): Actress, Television presenter
- Years active: 1987–present
- Spouse: Peter Sebotsa
- Children: 2

Nomathemba 'Thembisile' Matu (born 1966), also known as Thembsie Matu, is a South African actress and television presenter. She is best known for the roles in the television serials such as Tshisa, Rockville and The Queen.

== Personal life ==
Matu was born in 1966 in Katlehong, Gauteng, South Africa. She grew up with her mother after her father abandoned them.

She was married to Peter Sebotsa, an Anglican minister, who died after drowning in the family's pool in June 2019. She has one daughter and one son. In 2021, she contracted COVID-19 and spent five weeks in the hospital.

== Career ==
In 1987, she made her professional stage debut in the play Sekunjalo. After that, she performed in the plays What A Shame (1989) and Give A Child (1989). In 1994, she entered television with the serial Mama’s Love and then in the serial Lahliwe (1999).

In 2006, she appeared in the SABC1 drama series Tshisa in the role of Nomathamsanqa. She continued to play the role for six years. Meanwhile in 2006, she acted in the SABC3 drama television serial The Lab. In the serial, she played the recurring role of Zinhle until 2008. She also joined the SABC1 mini-serial uGugu no Andile and played the guest role of "Teacher". In 2008, she appeared on the e.tv soap opera Rhythm City in the guest role Sis Bee. During this period, she made supportive and guest roles in many television serials such as Zone 14, Gaz'lam, Home Affairs, Zero Tolerance, The Lab and Jacob's Cross. In 2009, she acted in the comedy film Finding Lenny directed by Neal Sundstrom. After that, she joined the SABC1 sitcom Abo Mzala and starred the role of Zodwa in the second season, which was previously played by Lusanda Mbane.

In 2011, she played the role Novezake in the first season of SABC1 serial Intsika. Then in the same year, she joined the serial Soul Buddyz to play the supportive role of Mrs Vilakazi. After that, she appeared in the serial The Wild as Gertrude. In the next year, she acted in the second season of the SABC2 serial Moferefere Lenyalong as Boreng. In 2013, she appeared in Rockville as Sis Ribs, where she was nominated for the Best Supporting Actress in a TV Drama at the 2014 South African Film and Television Awards (SAFTA). In the preceding years, she continued to act in many television serials such as Abo Mzala, Thandeka's Diary, MTV Shuga and Thuli noThulani. However her most popular television role came through the Mzansi Magic telenovela The Queen when she played the role "Petronella". With that popularity, she continued to play the role from season 2 to season 6 in 2021.

Apart from television acting, she appeared in the popular commercial for the insecticide Doom. In 2018, she was nominated for the Diva Extraordinaire of the year at the 2018 Feather Awards. In 2019, she co-hosted the show "Fragrance Your Life" with Nomsa Buthelezi aired on e.tv. Meanwhile, she also won the awards for the Favourite Actress and Ultimate Viewers' Choice awards at the 2018 DStv Mzansi Viewers' Choice Awards.

== Filmography ==
Year	Film	Role	Genre	Ref.
2006	Tshisa	Nomathamsanqa	TV series	
2006	Zone 14	Aunt Napho	TV series	
2006	Gaz'lam	Woman 3	TV series	
2006	Home Affairs	Nolitha	TV series	
2006	Zero Tolerance	Stella Hadebe	TV series	
2006	The Lab	Zinhle	TV series	
2007	Jacob's Cross	Rebecca	TV series	
2007	Nomzamo	Gladys	TV series	
2008	Rhythm City	Sis Bee	TV series	
2008	uGugu no Andile	Teacher	TV series	
2008	Izingane zoBaba	Rose	TV series	
2009	Gangster's Paradise: Jerusalema	The Loan Shark	Film	
2009	Finding Lenny	Big Momma	Film	
2011	Intsika	Novezake	TV series	
2011	Soul Buddyz	Mrs Vilakazi	TV series	
2011	The Wild	Gertrude	TV series	
2012	Moferefere Lenyalong	Boreng	TV series	
2013	Rockville	Sis Ribs	TV series	
2013	Zaziwa	Herself	TV series	
2014	Skeem Saam	Ousie Tlaki	TV series	
2015	Abo Mzala	Zodwa	TV series	
2015	Thandeka's Diary	Ntombi	TV series	
2017	MTV Shuga	Mama Chillaz	TV series	
2017	The Queen	Petronella	TV series	
2017	Thuli noThulani	Mrs Zondi	TV series	
2024	Lobola Man	Aunt Miriam	Film	
