= Zandile Msutwana =

South African actress

- Born: Zandile Msutwana; 6 July 1979 (age 46); Qonce, Eastern Cape, South Africa
- Occupation: Actress
- Years active: Early 2000s–present
- Known for: The Queen as Vuyiswa Jola

Zandile Msutwana (born 6 July 1979 in Qonce) is a South African actress best known for her leading role as Akua Yenana on the 2007–2010 SABC 1 drama series Society.

== Education ==
She was enrolled at UCT where she achieved a Performers Diploma in Speech and Drama.

== Career ==
Msutwana started her acting career whilst at university, having appeared on productions such as; King Lear, The Suit, Brink, Trojan Women.

Her professional acting career began in 2007 where she portrayed a lead role on SABC 1's drama series Society. She starred as Akua Yenana, a stockbroker then a lady of leisure until its departure in 2010.

In 2009, she starred a main role as the bride, Ayanda, on the White Wedding film alongside Kenneth Nkosi, the groom, and Rapulana Seiphemo, the best man.

In 2013, she portrayed a main role on Mzansi Magic's Zabalaza until its departure in 2015 which featured Baby Cele.

In 2016, on Mzansi Magic's drama series Isikizi; she starred as Nomazwe, a mother who gives birth to a prince's son who is declared by the king's Sangoma (traditional healer) as a cursed newborn who'll grow to kill his father and marry his mother.

She starred the role of princess Nomakhwezi on Igazi's Season 1, a Shona and Connie Ferguson production, alongside Vatiswa Ndara, Jet Novuka and the late Nomhle Nkonyeni.

She starred as the main role of Vuyiswa Jola on The Queen, alongside Shona Ferguson and Connie Ferguson from 2016-2022.

She played the role of Zimkitha Mxenge in the show Gqeberha: The Empire for the entirety of the shows two season run. Her other television casts include Home Affairs, Mtunzini.com, Isidingo, Rhythm City and Soul City. and her other film casts include The Algiers Murders and A Small Town Called Descent.

== Selected filmography ==
Year	Film	Role
2007- 2010	Society	Akua Yenana
2016 - 2022	The Queen	Vuyiswa Jola
2014	Igazi	Nomakhwezi
2016	Isikizi	Nomazwe
2023 - 2025	Gqeberha: The Empire	Zimkhitha Mxenge

== Awards and nominations ==
She was nominated the SAFTA Golden Horn: Best Supporting Actress award in 2010 for her role in the 2009 White Wedding film.
