= Sthandile Nkosi =

South African actress (born 1993)

- Born: 24 September 1993 (age 33); Soshanguve, Pretoria, South Africa
- Education: Tshwane University of Technology
- Occupations: Actress; screenwriter; director
- Years active: 2014–present
- Known for: Scandal!; The Queen

Sthandile Nkosi (born 24 September 1993) is a South African actress, screenwriter and director. She is best known for portraying starring role of Londiwe Jama on The Queen (2022–2023) and Scandal! (2024–2026) as Unity.

== Early life ==
Nkosi was born in Soshanguve, Johannesburg, South Africa. She attended Vilhalla Primary School in Centurion and Pro Arte Alphen Park High School in Alphen Park. In 2016, she obtained a Diploma in Dramatic Arts and Baccalaureus Technologies Degree from Tshwane University of Technology, and she was majoring with directing and scriptwriting in her final year.

== Career ==
Nkosi began her acting career performing in theatre productions while studying drama. Her early stage credits include A Woman in Waiting (2014) playing the role of young Thembi Mtshali, and Alcohol DTI Educational Theatre Roadshow (2014), followed by Dipolelo Gotswa Borwa (2015), Adaptation of Medea (2015), Ubulution (2016), My Dog Don't Like Black People (2017) and Reen Bloed Nasie (2018). In 2018, she wrote and directed the play Ninah. She made her professional theatre appearance in Saving Azania in 2019.

Nkosi made her television debut in MTV Shuga: Down South in 2019, appearing as a manicurist. The same year, she appeared as Koketso in the television film Nnake and as Teaspoon in the Mzansi Magic drama series Vula Vala.

== Filmography ==
Filmography
Year	Title	Role	Notes / Format
2018–2019	MTV Shuga Down South	Manicurist	Television series (Season 2)
2019	Pretty's Daughter	Amy	Short film
2019	Mamodibe	Amahle	Television film
2020	uVula Vala	Teaspoon	Television series
2021	Dead Places	Mary	Netflix series
2022	Money Heist	Karabo	Television series
2022	BO MMA-In Law	Karabo	Television series
2022	Mr. Bones 3: Son of Bones	Amina	Feature film
2022	uMbali	Mbali	Lead role
2022	The Brave Ones	Ntsiki Gasa	Lead role; Netflix series
2022–2023	The Queen	Londiwe Jama	Television series
2023–2024	Generations: The Legacy	Sonia	Television series
2024	Savage Beauty	Lorraine	Netflix series (Season 2)
2024	Lobola Man	Rachel	Netflix film
2024–present	Scandal!	Unity	Television series
