= Skeleton Coast (disambiguation) =

The Skeleton Coast is a section of coast in Namibia.

Skeleton Coast may also refer to:

- Skeleton Coast (1987 film)
- Skeleton Coast (2024 film)
- Skeleton Coast, an album by The Lawrence Arms
- Skeleton Coast, a novel by Clive Cussler

== See also ==
- Coast of Skeletons, 1965 film
