= Gail Mabalane =

Gail Nkoane Mabalane
- Born: Gail Tsholofelo Nkoane; 27 December 1984 (age 41); Kimberley, Northern Cape, South Africa
- Occupations: Actress; model; entrepreneur; philanthropist; singer; socialite
- Years active: 2010 - present
- Notable work: The Road (2015); The Wild (2011 - 2013); The Imposter (2018); Blood and Water (2020 - present)
- Spouse: Kabelo Mabalane (m. 2013)
- Children: 2
- Musical career
- Instrument: Vocals
- Years active: 2010 – present

Gail Mabalane (née Nkoane; born 27 December 1984) is a South African actress, model, media socialite, businesswoman and singer. She is most notable for acting roles on the South African television series "The Wild", and recently starred on the television series "The Road", which airs on Mzansi Magic every weeknight. She plays Thandeka Khumalo on Blood & Water, which is only available on Netflix. She also appeared in the Netflix movie "Happiness is" that premiered on 18 October 2024.

== Life and career ==
=== Early life ===
Mabalane was born Gail Nkoane and raised in the town of Kimberley, Northern Cape in South Africa. She is the middle child of three children. Her mother entered her into her first pageant, "Miss Tinkerbell" when she was five years old. It was at this point that her family noticed her potential. In 2005, she was a Top 5 Miss SA Teen Finalist.

=== Breakthrough ===
In 2010, Mabalane auditioned for and became a Top 10 Finalist on the 6th Season on Idols South Africa. She was the first to be eliminated from the Final Top 10 after performing "Please Don't Leave Me", originally by P!nk.

In 2011, Mabalane obtained her major acting debut role as Lelo Sedibe on the MNet TV Series "The Wild", alongside major South African actress Connie Ferguson. The show was later cancelled by MNet in 2013. In August 2015, she made her first appearance on South Africa's most viewed television soapie, Generations: The Legacy, once again alongside Connie Ferguson.

== Filmography ==
=== Films ===
Year	Title	Role	Notes
2012	Zion		
2021	Indemnity		
2023	Unseen	Zenzi Mwale	Main role
2024	Happiness Is	Tumi	Main role

=== Television ===
Year	Title	Role	Notes
2010	Idols (season 6)	Herself	Season 6 Top 10 Finalist
2011 - 2013	The Wild	Lelo Sedibe	Lead role
2013 - 2014	Rockville	Vicky	Minor role
2015	Generations: The Legacy	Sarah Westbrook	Minor role
2015	The Road	Kedibone "Kedi" Seakgoe / Stella Phiri	Main role (Episode 1 to 60)
2016	Rockville	Vicky	Main, recurring
2018	The Imposter	Kelenogile Mokoena	Main role (Season 2)
2020	Blood & Water	Thandeka Khumalo	Main role

== Personal life ==
Gail Mabalane was born on the 27 December 1984 in Kimberly, South Africa. Her mother entered her into pageant shows before her death from a long-term illness after her brother's accidental death on Christmas Eve. In 2013, her father also died shortly after her wedding to Kabelo Mabalane. Gail and Kabelo have two children.
