= Thuli Phongolo =

South African actress and DJ (born 1994)

- Born: Thulisile Phongolo; 22 January 1994 (age 32); Soweto, Gauteng, South Africa
- Other name: Thuli P
- Education: University of Johannesburg
- Occupations: Actress; DJ
- Years active: 2012-present

Thulisile Phongolo (born 22 January 1994), also known as Thuli P, is a South African actress, DJ and media personality. She is best known for playing a role of Namhla Diale in Generations:The Legacy.

== Early life ==
Phongolo was born on 22 January 1994, in Soweto, Gauteng, South Africa. She pursued her Strategic Marketing degree from the University of Johannesburg after passing her matric at Allen Glen High School.

== Career ==
Phongolo began her acting career playing Zama on the South African Broadcasting Corporation's (SABC) TV series Tshisa. While a prefect at her high school, Phongolo played Namhla Diale on the soap opera Generations: The Legacy. After leaving that show in 2018, Phongolo acted in SABC's TV series Makoti and Mzansi Magic's The Republic.

In November 2021, she was performing in The Wife: Showmax's telenovela adaptation of Dudu Busani-Dube's Hlomu, The Wife. That same month, she was announced to be appearing in the film, I Am Sofia. As of April 2023, Phongolo was still appeared on Makoti.

In 2017, Phongolo was an amateur disc jockey, a profession she maintained through at least April 2023.

In 2025, she released her debut single "Hai Suka", featuring Nia Pearl and Kay Invictus.

In January 2026, she released her debut extended play (EP), Avana, under her independent label Avana Records. The record was self-funded and marked her expansion as a recording artist.

== Business Ventures ==
Phongolo has launched several business ventures, including her fashion brand TULIP and her independent record label Avana Records.

She has also invested in property and other entrepreneurial ventures.

== Public Image and Media Presence ==
Phongolo has a significant following and is regarded as a prominent media personality in South Africa's entertainment industry.

In 2025, she was announced as one of the DJs for the TikTok Sub-Saharan Africa Awards, highlighting her influence in digital entertainment.

== Filmography ==
Year	Film	Role
2012	Tshisa	Zama
2014-2016	Generations: The Legacy	Namhla Diale
2019-2022	Makoti	Lilitha
2019	The Republic	Mbali
2021	The Wife	Lerato
2021	Rockville	Buhle
2025	Generations: The Legacy	Namhla Diale

== Personal life ==
Phongolo has received media attention for aspects of her personal life.
