= Kagiso Rathebe =

South African actor

- Born: 26 October 1992 (age 33); Johannesburg, South Africa
- Occupation: Actor
- Notable work: Scandal; How To Ruin Christmas; Spoorloos; Keeping Score; Generations: The Legacy; Entangled; The Queen; Noughts & Crosses; Law, Love & Betrayal

Kagiso Rathebe (born 26 October 1992) is a South African actor and model. After graduating from The Market Theatre Laboratory, Kagiso went on to star on shows such as How To Ruin Christmas, Spoorloos, The Queen, and Noughts & Crosses. He is best known for his role as Amo on Scandal!

In addition to his 2022 guest appearance on The River, 2023 also saw Kagiso star in Amazon Prime's "My Girlfriends Father" as well as Mzansi Magic's crime thriller "Maru A Pula" - both film's directed by filmmaker Kagiso Sam Leburu.

Kagiso currently stars as a paralegal attorney on Showmax’s brand new legal drama Law, Love & Betrayal; his next film, Netflix's City of Gold, is set to be released later this year.

== Early life and education ==
Kagiso Rathebe was born on 26 October 1992, in South Africa. From a young age, Rathebe exhibited a passion for the performing arts, which later led him to pursue formal training. In 2013, he enrolled at The Market Theatre Laboratory, where he studied for two years and attained a qualification in Live Performance.

== Career ==
=== Theatre Beginnings ===
Kagiso Rathebe’s acting career began on the stage. His debut came in 2013 with a role in the theatre production Milk and Honey. This early experience in theatre allowed him to hone his skills and prepared him for a diverse career in acting.

== Television and Film Career ==
Breakthrough in International Television

In 2018, Rathebe secured his first international role as Chidike Akindele in the BBC drama “Noughts & Crosses.” In this series, he starred opposite Bonnie Mbuli, playing the role of her lover. The opportunity to work on a high-profile project provided Rathebe with significant exposure and expanded his acting portfolio.

=== Acclaimed Short Film – Opus ===
Within the same year, Rathebe took on the lead role in the award-winning short film “Opus.” The film, based on the true story of classical bassist Vimbs Mavimbs, garnered international attention, with screenings at multiple film festivals, including those in Atlanta, Washington D.C., and Italy. “Opus” won the Best Short Narrative award at both The Silicone Valley Film Festival and the Jozi Film Festival, solidifying Rathebe's reputation as a versatile actor.

=== Role on Scandal! ===
Rathebe is perhaps best known for his role as Amo on the popular South African soap opera “Scandal!” He joined the cast of e.tv's “Scandal!” as a freelance photographer in his late 20s working for NFH. His character, initially charming and likeable, eventually turned into a cold-blooded villain, which captivated audiences and led to a significant boost in the show’s ratings. During his three and a half years on “Scandal!,” the show saw an increase in viewership from 4.9 million to 5.27 million viewers within a month, largely due to the compelling storyline involving his character. Amo's transformation and eventual exit from the show in 2023 earned Rathebe critical acclaim from both the show's producers and audience alike.

=== Recent Work and Guest Appearances ===
After his role on “Scandal!,” Rathebe went on to star as a serial killer in Mzansi Magic's The Queen; as well as making a guest appearance on 1Magic's “The River”. In 2023, Rathebe starred in Amazon Prime's “My Girlfriend’s Father” and the Mzansi Magic crime thriller “Maru A Pula,” where he portrayed a disgraced detective grieving the loss of his child while investigating another missing girl's case. Both films were directed by filmmaker Kagiso Sam Leburu.

=== Other Notable Roles ===
In addition to his work on “Scandal!” and other shows, Rathebe has appeared in various television series, including “Keeping Score,” “Generations: The Legacy,” “Spoorloos,” and Netflix's “How To Ruin Christmas.”

== Beyond Acting ==
=== Voice Work and Hosting ===
Outside of acting, Rathebe has an extensive background in voice work. He has provided live announcements for department stores such as Game and Builders Warehouse for over six years. Additionally, he has experience in short radio commercials and corporate campaign videos. In 2015, Rathebe hosted The International Franchise Expo at Sandton Convention Centre, an event that ran for three days.

== Music career ==
Apart from his acting and modeling careers, Kagiso Rathebe is also a musician. He has released several tracks on SoundCloud, showcasing his talents as a songwriter and guitarist. His creative pursuits in music complement his work in the entertainment industry, further highlighting his diverse artistic abilities.
