= Minnie Dlamini =

South African actress, television personality and model

- Born: Minenhle Dlamini; 7 July 1990 (age 36); Durban, KwaZulu-Natal, South Africa
- Education: Northlands Girls' High School; University of Cape Town; Glenashley Preparatory School
- Occupations: Television presenter; media personality; on-air personality; model; actress
- Years active: 2010–present
- Spouse: Quinton Jones (m. 2017; div. 2022)
- Children: 1
- Website: mdskincare.co.za

Minenhle Dlamini (born 7 July 1990), known as Minnie Dlamini, is a South African television presenter, actress and model. In 2010 she was selected as the new presenter for the SABC 1 Friday live-music show Live Amp.

== Early life and education ==
She was born to Jabulani and Queen Dlamini in Durban, KwaZulu-Natal Province of South Africa. She had her early education at Northlands Girls' High School before she proceeded to the University of Cape Town where she studied film, media, drama and economics[incomplete/excluded].

== Personal life ==
On 8 July 2017, she married Quinton Jones in a traditional marriage which took place in Glenn Hills, Durban North; before, they went on to do the white wedding on 16 September with exclusive coverage rights sold to Multichoice for R6-million.

On 13 October, through Vuzu Amp on DStv, she debuted the first episode of Minnie Dlamini: Becoming Mrs Jones, a three-part reality docu-series which documents her pre-wedding and post-wedding journey. On 19 October, VuzuTV announced via Twitter, that the first episode of Minnie Dlamini: Becoming Mrs Jones became the highest rated show in Vuzu Amp history.

In early 2022, it was reported that Minenhle and Quinton filed for divorce after four years of marriage after it was rumoured that she had cheated with businessman Edwin Sodi.

== Career ==
=== On-air personality ===
While studying at the University of Cape Town, Dlamini was a presenter for LIVE on 16 June 2010, after she made her debut screen appearance while covering the "Youth Day" and "World Cup celebrations" shows. She later co-hosted Mzansi Insider, an SABC 1's lifestyle show. In 2012, she resigned from the show in order to pursue a career in acting. In 2013, Minnie switched to sports broadcasting by co-hosting Soccerzone with Thomas Mlambo, until in 2016 when the show's format was changed by SABC 1. She has since co-hosted several local and international award ceremonies, including the 14th Metro FM Music Awards, 2016 Africa Magic Viewers Choice Awards, the PSL Awards and the South African Film and Television Awards.

=== Acting ===
In 2010, Dlamini debuted as a film actress in Generations, a SABC 1 TV soap in which she made a guest appearance as Miranda. She went on to play a lead role as Zintle Lebone in the soap The Wild and as Nosipho Bogatsu in Rockville.

=== Modelling ===
In September 2011, Dlamini was announced as the new face of South African departmental store LEGit, with her own fashion range, the Minnie-Series. In 2022 Minnie Dlamine wore a limited edition Veldskoen Shoes sneaker in collaboration with DHL at the Paris Fashion Week before it was officially launched in Paris.

== Filmography ==
Film
| Year | Film | Role | Notes |
|---|---|---|---|
| 2010 | Generations | as Miranda | Guest appearance |
| 2011 | The Wild | as Zintle Lebone | Lead role |
| 2013 | Rockville | as Nosipho Bogatsu | Supporting role |
| 2015 | Our Perfect Wedding | Herself | Host/Presenter |
| 2016 | HomeGround | Herself | Presenter |
| 2017 | Becoming Mrs. Jones | Herself | Reality |

== Philanthropy ==
In 2014, Dlamini founded the Minnie Dlamini Foundation, a charity organization established with the aim of helping young South African girls have access to good education. On 15 July 2015, she announced via Twitter that her foundation will be sponsoring 29 students with their university fees.

== Achievements ==
=== Basadi in Music Awards ===
| Year | Nominee / work | Award | Result | Ref. |
|---|---|---|---|---|
| 2026 | Herself | Entertainment TV Producer of the Year | Won | |

=== National Film and Television Awards ===
| Year | Nominee / work | Award | Result | Ref. |
|---|---|---|---|---|
| 2024 | Herself | Best Female TV Personality 2024 | Nominated | |
