= Isibhamu =

South African drama television series

- Genre: Thriller; supranatural drama
- Created by: Ranga Chikwene
- Written by: Ranga Chikwene; Paul S Rowlston; Thapelo Motloung; Nombulelo Mcwerah; Sebabatso Mofokeng
- Directed by: Dominic Black; Nthabi Tau; Siyabonga Mkhize
- Starring: Khojane Morai; Lerato Mokoka; Ncibijana Madlala; Elliot Makhubo; Zikhona Bali
- Country of origin: South Africa
- Original languages: English; Zulu
- No. of seasons: 1
- No. of episodes: 7

Production
- Executive producer: Ranga Chikwene
- Producer: The Three Warlocks Production
- Camera setup: Multi-camera
- Running time: 50–54 minutes

Original release
- Network: Mzansi Magic
- Release: 7 June – 19 July 2026

Isibhamu is a South African supernatural drama series that premiered on Mzansi Magic on 7 June 2026. The drama series follows heartbroken young man, Siphamamdla, on his quest to avenge his father's murder, whose actions unleash an enchanted gun.

== Premise ==
Isibhamu is a supernatural drama that follows Siphamandla, a heartbroken young man trying to avenge his father’s murder. In his pursuit, he uncovers a powerful gun possessed by an evil muti spirit. When he looses the gun in a small town, a deadly relay begins as the enchanted weapon passes from person to person, creating a dark trail of mayhem and violence across the small community.

== Cast ==
- Khojane Morai as Sphamandla
- Lerato Mokoka as Naleli
- Ncibijana Madlala as Conrad Khoza
- Elliot Makhubo as Mhlongo
- Zikhona Bali as Detective Sambo
- Amo Chidi as Bokang

== Production ==
Isibhamu is a South African supernatural television drama series produced by The Three Warlocks Production in co-production with Crystal Pics TV. The series premiered on Mzansi Magic on 7 June 2026 and is based on the popular Zambian drama series Mfuti. The series explores themes of love, vengeance and supernatural. Commissioned in 2025 by Mzansi Magic, production of the series took place between February and April of 2026

== Release ==
The series premiered on Mzansi Magic from 7 June 2026, airing only on Sundays at 20:00 for one hour.
