= The Queen (South African TV series) =

South African TV Series

- Season 7 logo
- Genre: Telenovela
- Created by: Ferguson Films
- Written by: Phathutshedzo Makwarela; Gwydion Beynon; Christa Biyela; Duduzile Zamantungwa Mabaso; Lebogang Mogashoa; Chris Q. Radebe; Nelisiwe Ngcobo; Linda Bere; Sihle Mthembu; Sthembile Mnisi; Percy Bonga Vilakazi; Shitshembiso Mabasa; Bafana Khumalo; Zamani Khethelo; Donna Sibande; Kelton Sinyosi; Paul Crilley; Nandisa Mkhize; Tiisetso Tlelima
- Directed by: Andries van der Merwe; Xolani Mabaso; Zolani Phakade; Wandile Magadla
- Starring: Connie Ferguson; Shona Ferguson; Marah Louw; Sello Maake KaNcube; Rami Chuene; Rapulana Seiphemo; Sthandile Nkosi; Loyiso McDonald; Sthembiso SK Khoza; Dineo Moekesti-Langa; Natasha Thahane; Themba Ndaba; Zandile Msutwana; Zenande Mfenyana; Zolisa Xaluva; Thandy Matlalia; Jessica Nkosi; Cindy Mahlangu; Thembsie Matu; Mostoaledi Setumo; Vuyolwethu Ngcukana; Xolani Mayekiso; Nay Maps; Moshe Mdike; Sipho Manzini; Sibusiwe Jili; Ntando Duma; Lorraine Moropa; Khumbuza Meyiwa; Siphesihle Vazi; Ntobeko Mathebula; Craig Nobela; Thabang Molaba; Brenda Ngxoli; Mbulelo Katise; TK Sebothoma; Lunathi Mampofu; Joe Kazadi; Senzo Radebe; Sipho Ndlovu; Kagiso Rathebe; Buhle Mofokeng; Neo Rapostoa; Philiso Mohlala; Tshiamo Malobi; Paballo Koza; Candice Modiselle; Tisetso Thoka; Simo Magwaza; Chris Jafta; Tebogo Mbele; Thabsile Zikhali; Angela Sithole; Vusi Thanda; Kamvelitsha Bikitsha; Tshepo Desando; Mbali Nkosi; Fezile Makhanya; Lorcia Cooper-Khumalo; Kwanele Mthethwa; Mpumi Moana; Sannah Mnchunu; Nomsa Buthelezi-Shezi; Khuli Roberts; Rosemary Zimu; Kay Sibiya; Jesse Suntele; Thato Malomu; Zenzo Nqobe; Kabelo Molaousi; Patrick Ndlovu; With Special Guest Appearance by: Sindi Dlathu As; Lindiwe Dlamini-Dikana
- Theme music composer: Joel Assaizky
- Opening theme: The Queen Title Sequence
- Ending theme: The Queen Ending Sequence
- Country of origin: South Africa
- Original languages: English; Setswana; Sepedi; Afrikaans; isiZulu; isiXhosa
- No. of seasons: 7
- No. of episodes: 1,633 episodes

Production
- Executive producer: Connie Ferguson
- Producers: Lauren Neil; Amanda Quwe; Eva Khumalo Banda
- Cinematography: Leon Kriel
- Camera setup: Multi-camera
- Running time: 22 - 24 minutes
- Production company: Ferguson Films
- Budget: R9 million

Original release
- Network: Mzansi Magic
- Release: 1 August 2016 – 13 January 2023

Related
- The Throne; The River

The Queen was a South African telenovela that premiered on Mzansi Magic on 1 August 2016 and on Canal Plus in April 2020. It is produced by Ferguson Films, owned by acting veterans Connie Ferguson and her late husband Shona Ferguson. The Queen ran for 260 episodes per season and aired every Monday to Friday at 21h00 on Mzansi Magic.

The Queen concluded season 4 with a one-hour finale on Friday 24 July 2020, season 5 premiered on Monday 27 July 2020. The Queen had a crossover episode with The River, featuring Sindi Dlathu as Lindiwe Dlamini -Dikana who is Harriet's friend.

Longtime series star Loyiso Macdonald (who had been part of the cast since the show's inception) exited the show in June 2021. Zandile Msutwana suffered an injury on set and she was temporarily replaced by Thembisa Mdoda-Nxumalo while she recovered at home.

The channel cancelled the show in March 2022 when The Queen was renewed for a shortened seventh and final season, with only 125 episodes instead of the usual 260-episode season order. Season 7 premiered in July 2022 and ran until a series finale on 13 January 2023 following seven successful seasons. The telenovela was replaced by a Xhosa's first and exclusive telenovela titled Gqeberha: The Empire which was produced by Tshedza Pictures.

== Episodes ==
Series	Episodes	Originally released	
Series	Episodes	First released	Last released
1	208	1 August 2016	27 July 2017
2	260	31 July 2017	27 July 2018
3	260	30 July 2018	26 July 2019
4	260	29 July 2019	24 July 2020
5	260	27 July 2020	23 July 2021
6	260	26 July 2021	22 July 2022
7	125	25 July 2022	13 January 2023

== Plot ==
The show revolves around the Khoza family, drug lords who hide their dealings behind their logistics company, and their conflicts with their competitors and the Tembisa Police Service. Harriet Khoza known as "The Queen" takes over the reins of the Khoza dynasty after her husband passes and does everything to protect herself as well as her family from Jerry Maake a police captain who believes Harriet killed his son and is determined to bring her and her criminal organisation down. As the series progresses Harriet Khoza then takes on Gracious Mabuza and her daughter Goodness Mabuza in their war against each other. The Khoza's world is turned upside down by the arrival of a new lethal and ambitious enemy Thando Sebata (Jessica Nkosi) a powerful drug lord heiress, trained assassin and sniper who runs her families drug empire with an iron fist and takes the throne right from under Harriet and becomes the new drug queen-pin of Midrand (Connie Ferguson) and (Themba Ndaba) are the only actors who appeared in the premiere and are scheduled to appear in the series finale.

== Main characters ==
- Harriet Khoza (Played by Connie Ferguson)

Harriet Khoza is the female protagonist and matriarch of the criminal Khoza family. As a drug queenpin, she takes over the business after her husband's death and works with her brother-in-law, Brutus. She is fiercely protective of her children, Kea and Kagiso, and hires a hitman to kill her husband. In a long-running plotline, she is haunted by her traumatic past when she is forced to confront her abusive father, Tiro, who is later disowned by the family and commits suicide. Harriet eventually partners with Hector Sebata and later marries him, but has him killed after discovering his affair with Vuyiswa.

- Captain Jeremiah "Jerry" Maake (Played by Shona Ferguson)

Captain Jerry Maake is a tough police officer determined to bring down the Khoza family's drug operation. His mission is intensely personal, as he believes Harriet was responsible for his son's death. He is married to Vuyiswa and is the father of Amo, Mogapi, and Bakang. Jerry is killed after jumping in front of a helicopter shooter's bullets to save Harriet's life.

- Keabetswe "Kea" Esmarelda Khoza (Played by Dineo Langa)

The daughter of Harriet and Mzi, Kea has a series of tragic romantic relationships, including one with an abusive man who is eventually killed by her family. She later elopes with a new boyfriend, Eric, but is tragically killed in an explosion on her way to Jerry Maake's funeral.

- Uncle Brutus Mfanafuthi Khoza (Played by Themba Ndaba)

Brutus is the male protagonist of the series and the Khoza family patriarch, alongside his sister-in-law, Harriet. He is the brother of Mzi and has many children. He and Harriet lead the drug syndicate and survive various attacks. He and Harriet eventually leave the drug business.

- Kagiso "Muscle Man" Melusi Khoza (Played by Loyiso MacDonald)

The youngest son of Harriet, Kagiso is a former army pilot who has complex romantic relationships, notably with Goodness Mabuza. He initially holds his mother responsible for Kea's death. He and Goodness later move away to start a new life but return to honor Kea's memory. He later seeks vengeance in season 7.

- Shaka Khoza (Played by Sthembiso Khoza)

Shaka is the oldest son of Mzi and a close associate of his uncle, Brutus. He was killed by his brother, Kagiso, but later returned from the dead, inciting a revenge plot. He had multiple failed relationships, including with Mmabatho and Goodness. He later leaves to avoid the police but returns to take over his father's business in season 7.

- Lieutenant Vuyiswa "Sis Vee" Maake-Sebata (Played by Zandile Msutwana)

A dedicated detective, Vuyiswa is initially Jerry's partner and later his wife. After Jerry is killed, Vuyiswa seeks justice and uncovers Hector Sebata's involvement in his murder. She later marries Hector, but they divorce, and she leaves town with their son after being threatened by Harriet.

== Cast members ==
- Connie Ferguson as Harriet Khoza
- Shona Ferguson as Jerry Maake
- Themba Ndaba as Brutus Khoza
- Loyiso MacDonald as Kagiso Khoza
- Sthembiso Khoza as Shaka Khoza
- Dineo Moeketsi as Kea Khoza
- Sello Maake Ka-Ncube as Kgosi Mathapelo
- Zandile Msutwana as Vuyiswa Jola
- Marah Louw as Boitswarelo Maake
- Zenzo Ngqobe as Mogapi Maake
- Natasha Thahane as Amo Maake
- Kabelo Moalusi as Roy Maake

=== Season 2 ===
- Connie Ferguson as Harriet Khoza
- Shona Ferguson as Jerry Maake
- Rami Chuene as Gracious Mabuza
- Themba Ndaba as Brutus Khoza
- Loyiso Macdonald as Kagiso Khoza
- Sthembiso Khoza as Shaka Khoza
- Dineo Moeketsi as Kea Khoza
- Zandile Msutwana as Vuyiswa Jola
- Zenande Mfenyana as Goodness Mabuza
- Marah Louw as Boitswarelo Maake
- Motsoaledi Setumo as Dr. Mabatho Mabuza
- Natasha Thahane as Amo Maake
- Khayakazi Kula as Martha Ndlovu
- Mlamli Mangcala as Sthembiso Radebe
- Thabang Molaba as Gift Mabuza
- Kabelo Moalusi as Roy Maake
- Thato Molamo as Bakang Maake
- Thandy Matlaila as Cleo

=== Season 3 ===
- Connie Ferguson as Harriet Khoza
- Shona Ferguson as Jerry Maake
- Rami Chuene as Gracious Mabuza
- Themba Ndaba as Brutus Khoza
- Loyiso Macdonald as Kagiso Khoza
- Sthembiso Khoza as Shaka Khoza
- Dineo Moeketsi as Kea Khoza
- Zandile Msutwana as Vuyiswa Jola - Maake
- Zenande Mfenyana as Goodness Mabuza
- Zolisa Xaluva as Diamond Mabuza
- Motsoaledi Setumo as Mmabatho Khoza
- Vuyo Ngcukana as Lumko Shumacher Toto
- Sipho Manzini as Jabulani "Mjekejeke" Zulu
- Thembsie Matu as Petronella Zulu
- Xolani Mayekiso as Thato Maake
- Nay Maps as Dingane Khoza
- Mlamli Mangcala as Sthembiso Radebe
- Moshe Ndiki as Prince
- Kayakazi Kula as Martha Ndlovu
- Sindi Dlathu as Lindiwe Dikana (Special Guest Crossover)

=== Season 4 ===
- Connie Ferguson as Harriet Khoza
- Shona Ferguson as Jerry Maake
- Rami Chuene as Gracious Mabuza
- Themba Ndaba as Brutus Khoza
- Loyiso Macdonald as Kagiso Khoza
- Sthembiso Khoza as Shaka Khoza
- Dineo Langa as Keabetswe Khoza
- Nay Maps Maphalala as Dingane Khoza
- Zandile Msutwana as Vuyiswa Jola - Maake
- Zenande Mfenyana as Goodness Mabuza
- Motsoaledi Setumo as Mmabatho Khoza
- Brenda Mhlongo as Ntombizodwa Khoza
- Vuyolwethu Ngcukana as Shumacher Toto
- Sipho Manzini as Jabulani "Mjekejeke" Zulu
- Thembsie Matu as Petronella Zulu
- Xolani Mayekiso as Thato Maake
- Mlamli Mangcala as Sthembiso Radebe
- Sibusisiwe Jili as Georgina Zulu
- Cindy Mahlangu as Siyanda Dlamini

=== Season 5 ===
- Connie Ferguson as Harriet Khoza
- Rapulana Seiphemo as Hector Sebata
- Themba Ndaba as Brutus Khoza
- Loyiso MacDonald as Kagiso Khoza
- Sthembiso Khoza as Shaka Khoza
- Rapulana Seiphemo as Hector Sebata
- Jessica Nkosi as Thando Sebata
- Zandile Msutwana as Vuyiswa Jola - Sebata
- Zenande Mfenyana as Goodness Mabuza - Khoza
- Vuyolwethu Ngcukana as Schumacher Toto
- Sipho Manzini as Jabulani "Mjekejeke" Zulu
- Thembsie Matu as Petronella Zulu
- Brenda Ngxoli NomaPrincess Matshikiza
- Ntando Duma as Mpho Sebata
- Kenneth Nkosi as Detective Jaros Motale
- Xolani Mayekiso as Thato Maake
- Sibusisiwe Jili as Georgina Zulu
- Cindy Mahlangu as Siyanda Dlamini

=== Season 6 ===
- Connie Ferguson as Harriet Khoza – Sebata
- Rapulana Seiphemo as Hector Sebata
- Themba Ndaba as Brutus Khoza
- Sthembiso Khoza as Shaka Khoza
- Jessica Nkosi as Thando Sebata
- Zandile Msutwana as Vuyiswa Maake
- Zenande Mfenyana as Goodness Mabuza - Khoza
- Vuyolwethu Ngcukana as Schumacher Toto
- Sipho Manzini as Jabulani "Mjekejeke" Zulu
- Thembsie Matu as Petronella Zulu
- Brenda Ngxoli as NomaPrincess Matshikiza
- Sibusisiwe Jili as Georgina Zulu
- Lorraine Moropa as Olerato Mathapelo
- Cindy Mahlangu as Siyanda Dlamini
- Khumbuza Meytwa as Bhambatha Khoza
- Siphesihle Vazi as Mlungisi Khoza
- Ntobeko Mathebula as Cebo'elihle Khoza
- Craig Nobela as Nkosiyabo Khoza
- Nomsa Buthelezi as Majali Khoza
- Sindi Dlathu as Lindiwe Dikana (Special Guest Crossover)

=== Season 7 ===
- Connie Ferguson as Harriet Khoza
- Themba Ndaba as Brutus Khoza
- Sithandile Nkosi as Londiwe Jama
- Lorraine Moropa as Olerato Mathapelo
- Siphesihle Vazi as Mlungisi Khoza
- Thembsie Matu as Petronella Zulu
- Kagiso Rathebe as Mncedisi
- Sipho Manzini as Jabulani "Mjekejeke" Zulu
- Vuyo Ngcukana as Shumacher Toto
- Mbulelo Katise as Duma Jama
- Khumbuza Meytwa as Bhambatha Khoza
- Ntobeko Mathebula as Cebo'elihle Khoza
- Craig Nobela as Nkosiyabo Khoza

== Former cast ==
Actor	Role	Seasons
Shona Ferguson	Jerry Maake	1-4
Rapulana Seiphemo	Hector Sebata	4-6
Zandile Msutwana	Vuyiswa Jola - Maake	1-6
Jessica Nkosi	Thando Sebata	5-6
Nomsa Bhuthelezi	MaJali Khoza	6
Dineo Langa	Kea Khoza	1-4
Loyiso MacDonald	Kagiso Khoza	1-7
Rami Chuene	Gracious Mabuza	2-4
Paballo Koza	Khaya Khoza	1 - 6
Thembisa Mdoda	Vuyiswa Jola - Maake	5
Zenande Mfenyane	Goodness Mabuza	1-7
Sthembiso Khoza	Shaka Khoza	1-7
Sibusisiwe Jili	Detective Georgina Zulu	4-6
Nay Maps	Dingane Khoza	4
Motsoaledi Setumo	Mmabatho Khoza	2-4
Zolisa Xaluva	Diamond Mabuza	2-3
Mlamli Mangcala	Sthembiso Radebe	1-4
Sello Maake	Kgosi Mathapelo	1; 5
Marah Louw	Boi Maake	1-2
Natasha Thahane	Amo Maake	1-4
Thato Molamo	Baking Nkwe	2
Xolani Mayekiso	Thato Maake	2-5
Ntando Duma	Mpho Sebata	5
Brenda Ngxoli	NomaPrincess Matshikiza	5-6
Kabelo Moalusi	Roy Maake	1-2
Thabang Molaba	Gift Mabuza	2
Thandy Matlaila	Cleo	1-3
Zenzo Ngcobe	Mohapi Maake	1
Joe Kazadi	Thabiso Ngcobo	3
Cindy Mahlangu	Siyanda Dlamini	3-6
Khanya Mkangisa	Akhona Jola	3-6
Lunathi Mampofu	Benni	3
Khayakazi Kula	Martha Ndlovu	1-3
Unathi Matu	Sipho	5
Pabee Moganedi	Mamiki	2
Jesse Suntele	Officer Bar	1
Kay Sibiya	Kwanele	2
Magic Hlatshwayo	Alfios	2
Moshe Ndiki	Prince	2-4
Angela Sithole	Onica	1-4
Robert Mpisi	Bhekumuzi Khoza	2-3
Unathi Guma	Babalwa	2
Thalitha Ndima	Prudence	3
Sana Mchunu	Tryphina	4
Tisetso Thoka	Ayihlome	7
Vusi Thanda	Mziwoxolo Mabuza	1-5

== Awards and nominations ==
Dstv Viewers Choice Awards
Year	Nominee / work	Award	Result
2017	"Sello Maake Ka-Ncube"	Favourite Actor	Nominated
2017	"Themba Ndaba"	Favourite Actor	Won
2018	"Thembsie Matu"	Favourite Actress	Won
2018	"Rami Chuene"	Favourite Actress	Nominated

The South African Film and Television Awards (Saftas)
Year	Nominee / work	Award	Result
2018	Joe Assaizky	Best Achievement In Original Music/Score-TV Soap/Telenovela	Nominated
2018	"Leon kriel"	Best Achievement in Cinematography-TV Soap/Telenovel	Nominated
2018	"Odette Earle"	Best Achievement in Art/ Production Design - TV Soap/Telenovela	Nominated
2018	"Ferguson Films"	Most Popular TV Soap/Telenovela	Nominated
2020	"Loyiso MacDonald"	Best Supporting Actor - Telenovela	Won

The Royalty Soapie Awards
Year	Nominee / work	Award	Result
2020	The Queen	Outstanding Lighting	Won
2020	The Queen	Outstanding Wardrobe	Won
2020	Sthembiso "Sk" Khoza	Outstanding Supporting Actor	Won
2021	The Queen	Outstanding Daily TV Drama	Nominated
2021	Themba Ndaba	Outstanding Lead Actor	Nominated
2021	Jessica Nkosi	Outstanding Female Villain	Won
2021	The Directing Team	Outstanding Direction Team	Nominated
2021	The Queen	Outstanding Cinematography	Nominated
2021	The Queen	Outstanding Editing Team	Nominated
2021	The Queen	Outstanding Wardrobe	Nominated
