= Kings of Jo'Burg =

South African television series

- Genre: Crime thriller
- Created by: Shona Ferguson
- Directed by: Samad Davis
- Starring: Connie Ferguson; Shona Ferguson; Zolisa Xaluva; Nobuhle Samuel; Cindy Mahlangu-Zungu; Angela Sithole Christopher; TK Sebothoma; Abdul Khoza; Sthembiso SK Khoza; Clint Brink; Thembisile Seete; Tsholofelo Matshaba; Nambitha Ben-Mazwi; Thapelo Mokoena; Jay Anstey; Sean Marco; Lorraine Moropa
- Country of origin: South Africa
- Original languages: English, Xhosa
- No. of seasons: 3
- No. of episodes: 21

Production
- Executive producer: Shona Ferguson Connie Ferguson Samad Davis
- Production location: South Africa
- Production company: Ferguson Films

Original release
- Network: Netflix
- Release: 4 December 2020 – present

Kings of Jo'burg is a South African television series about a Johannesburg criminal family, the Masire family. The series combines elements of crime, drama, and the supernatural. Created by Shona Ferguson, the franchise gained popularity on Netflix. The first season premiered on 4 December 2020.

== Overview ==
The franchise follows the Masire family, led by the charismatic and powerful Simon Masire, who is the kingpin of Jo'burg's criminal empire. The family faces various challenges, including power struggles, betrayals, and supernatural forces that threaten their existence. As the story unfolds, the Masire family must navigate these obstacles to protect their interests and maintain their dominance in the criminal underworld.

== Plot ==
The plot of the franchise centers around the Masire family's criminal activities and their internal dynamics. The first season introduces the audience to the world of the Masire family, led by Simon Masire. However, at the end of the first season, Simon disappears under mysterious circumstances, leaving a power vacuum within the family

In the second season, released January 23, 2023, the family faces the challenges of Simon's absence and the emergence of new enemies seeking to seize control of Johannesburg's criminal underworld. The Masire family must confront their own demons, navigate treacherous alliances, and protect their legacy amidst a supernatural family curse. The season explores themes of loyalty, betrayal, and the consequences of power.

The third season, released June 13, 2025, focuses on the Masire's family curse and introduces new supernatural elements with the mystical elements becoming dominant. It picks up with Mo taking the reins of the family control after his brother Simon's death, navigating both criminal operations and personal demons.

== Cast ==
- Shona Ferguson as Simon "Vader" Masire (season 1), kingpin of Jo'burg's criminal empire and patriarch of the Masire family.
- Zolisa Xaluva as Mogomotsi "Mo" Masire, the reluctant leader of the family.
- Connie Ferguson as Veronica Masire, Simon's twin sister who returns to the family after 20 years.
- Cindy Mahlangu as Phumzi, Mo's love interest and a key player in the family's operations.
- TK Sebothoma as Tlotlo Masire, Mo's son who seeks to establish his own power within the family.
- Sello Sebotsane as Agent Stan Mazibuko, Phumzi's uncle and a crucial ally to the Masire family.

== Episodes ==
Series overview
| Series | Episodes | Originally released |
|---|---|---|
| 1 | 6 | 4 December 2020 |
| 2 | 8 | 23 January 2023 |
| 3 | 7 | 13 June 2025 |

=== Season 1 (2020) ===
| No. overall | No. in season | Title | Original release date |
|---|---|---|---|
| 1 | 1 | "Vader (Father)" | 4 December 2020 |
| 2 | 2 | "My Brother's Keeper" | 4 December 2020 |
| 3 | 3 | "Rise & Fall of the Young Prince" | 4 December 2020 |
| 4 | 4 | "Equilibrium" | 4 December 2020 |
| 5 | 5 | "We Are Brothers" | 4 December 2020 |
| 6 | 6 | "The Sacrifice" | 4 December 2020 |

=== Season 2 (2023) ===
| No. overall | No. in season | Title | Original release date |
|---|---|---|---|
| 7 | 1 | "Episode 1" | 23 January 2023 |
| 8 | 2 | "Episode 2" | 23 January 2023 |
| 9 | 3 | "Episode 3" | 23 January 2023 |
| 10 | 4 | "Episode 4" | 23 January 2023 |
| 11 | 5 | "Episode 5" | 23 January 2023 |
| 12 | 6 | "Episode 6" | 23 January 2023 |
| 13 | 7 | "Episode 7" | 23 January 2023 |
| 14 | 8 | "Episode 8" | 23 January 2023 |

=== Season 3 (2025) ===
| No. overall | No. in season | Title | Original release date |
|---|---|---|---|
| 15 | 1 | "Episode 1" | 13 June 2025 |
| 16 | 2 | "Episode 2" | 13 June 2025 |
| 17 | 3 | "Episode 3" | 13 June 2025 |
| 18 | 4 | "Episode 4" | 13 June 2025 |
| 19 | 5 | "Episode 5" | 13 June 2025 |
| 20 | 6 | "Episode 6" | 13 June 2025 |
| 21 | 7 | "Episode 7" | 13 June 2025 |

== Reception ==
The franchise has received positive reviews for its storyline, cast performances, and its blend of genres. It has been praised for its ability to maintain its quality after the death of its creator, Shona Ferguson.
