= Cindy Mahlangu =

South African actress

- Born: 21 November 1996 (age 29); Mpumalanga, Witbank, South Africa
- Education: Höerskool Standerton
- Occupations: Actress; influencer; model
- Years active: 2017–present

Cindy Mahlangu (born 21 November 1996) is a South African actress, influencer and model. She is known for playing Violeta Mamba on the e.tv soap opera Scandal!, and Mzansi Magic telenovela The Queen as Siyanda Dlamini.

== Early life ==
Mahlangu was born on 21 November 1996, in Witbank, Mpumalanga, South Africa. She went to Höerskool Standerton where she was learning in both languages, English and Afrikaans. After her parents divorced, she and her brother was raised by their mother and grandmother.

== Career ==
In 2016, Mahlangu made her first debut in acting playing the role of Dumazile Mthethwa in The Herd. In 2019, she played the role of Siyanda Dlamini on Mzansi Magic in the South African TV series The Queen, and played the role of Kayise on Makoti.

In 2020, Mahlangu starred as Violeta Mamba on E.tv soap opera Scandal!, and starred on Netflix series Blood & Water as Zama. She also appeared in the Netflix series Kings of Jo'burg which went into a second series in January 2023. In 2025, she is currently playing the lead role of Pinky in Netflix crime Bad Influencer with Jo-Anne Reyneke and being a judge for Miss South Africa 2025.

== Personal life ==
Mahlangu is currently dating a South African football player Bongani Zungu. After two years of being together, they welcomed their first child, a son in 2022.

== Filmography ==
Year	Film	Role	Notes
2016	The Herd	Dumazile Mthethwa	Main role, season 1
2019	The Queen	Siyanda Dlamini	Main role, season 3–6
2019	Makoti	Kayise	Main role, season 1
2020	Scandal!	Violeta Mamba	Main role, season 15
2020	Blood & Water	Zama Bolton	Main role, season 1–3
2021	Kings of Jo'burg	Phumzile Masire	Starring role, season 1–3
2022	Kedibone	Buhle	Recurring role
2024	Skeleton Coast	Sash	Starring role
2024	Soft Love	Zandi J	Recurring role
2025	Miss South Africa 2025	Herself	Judge
2025	Bad Influencer	Pinky	Lead role, season 1
2026–present	Nyala O...	Lerato Dlamini	Lead role, season 1
