= Michelle Molatlou =

South African actress and former Miss Black South Africa (1973–2017)

- Born: Michelle Molatlou; 1973; South Africa
- Died: 19 December 2017 (aged 44); Bloemfontein, South Africa
- Occupations: Actress, Television presenter
- Years active: 1993–2017
- Children: 2
- Awards: Miss Black South Africa

Michelle Molatlou (1973 – 19 December 2017) was a South African actress, television presenter and Former Miss Black South Africa. She is best known for the roles in the television serials such as; In the Name of Love, Mokgonyana Matswale and Generations.

== Personal life ==
She had one brother, Kgosi Monye.

She was married to businessman Malope Mojapelo from 2006 to 2014. She was a mother of two sons.

She died on 19 December 2017 at the age of 44 while receiving treatment for cervical cancer at the National Hospital in Bloemfontein.

== Career ==
In 1993, she won the Miss Black South Africa pageant. With that, she became the last person to win the title before the pageant was discontinued since then. After the pageant, she joined with SABC2 as a television presenter to host the magazine show Mamepe. Meanwhile, she joined with television serials such as; Kgalelo Pelo, In the Name of Love, and Mokgonyana Matswale. However, her most notable television acting came through the SABC1 soap opera Generations: The Legacy in 2016. In 2017, she worked as the presenter of Mzansi Magic program Lokshin Bioscope movies.

In 2000, she made the film debut with direct-to-video Die Wüstenrose where she played the role of "Luna". Then she made appearances in many direct-to-video films such as; Eine Liebe in Afrika, Folge deinem Herzen, Für immer Afrika and Afrika im Herzen.

== Filmography ==
Year	Film	Role	Genre	Ref.
2000	Die Wüstenrose	Luna	TV movie	
2002	Eine Liebe in Afrika	Anina	TV movie	
2006	Folge deinem Herzen	Ari	TV movie	
2007	Für immer Afrika	Ari	TV movie	
2008	Afrika im Herzen	Ari	TV movie	
	Kgalelo Pelo		TV series	
	In the Name of Love		TV series	
	Mokgonyana Matswale		TV series	
2016	Generations: The Legacy		TV series	
