= Northlands Girls' High School =

Location
- 16 Cadogan Drive, Durban North; KwaZulu-Natal; South Africa

Information
- Type: Public school, All Girls
- Motto: Quisque Sibi Verus (To thine own self be true)
- Established: 1 October 1953
- Principal: Mr. T.s Reddy
- Grades: Grade 8-Grade 12
- Houses: Banks, Shepstone, Lewis and Vaughan
- Colour: Banks-Blue (colour) Shepstone Red (colour) Lewis-Yellow (colour) Vaughan-Green (colour)
- Website: www.nghs.co.za

Northlands Girls High School 'NGHS' is an all-girls school situated in the suburb of Durban North, South Africa. It has a strong relationship with its brother school, Northwood School for boys. NGHS, the first secondary school to be built in Durban North. NGHS was originally called Durban North High School. A decision by the Department of Education to separate boys and girls schools in 1953 resulted in the newly formed Northlands Girls' High School and on 1 October 1953 a march by the boys, led by headmaster Percy Hardaker, to take occupancy of the new what was to be known as Northlands Boys' High School whilst the girls lined the route, waving goodbye.

The badge of the original school featured a sailing ship. On the separation into single-sex schools in 1953, it was replaced by a knight's helm, which is still featured in the current badge. The school has around 700 students, aged 13 to 18 years.

The school's motto is Quisque Sibi Verus, which is Latin and means to thine own self be true.

== Notable alumnae ==
- Aimee Barrett-Theron, rugby union referee and former player
- Marsha Cox, field hockey player
- Minnie Dlamini, on-air personality, actress and model
- Tyler-Jane Coleman, South African Rugby Women's Player
