= Zolisa Xaluva =

South African actor

- Born: Zolisa Xaluva; 13 June 1981 (age 45); Gqeberha, Eastern Cape, South Africa
- Occupation: Actor
- Years active: 2004–present
- Notable work: Generations; The Queen; Gomora

Zolisa Xaluva (born 13 June 1981) is a South African actor. He is best known for his starring role in the popular series Generations as Jason and Mzansi Magic telenovelas The Queen as Diamond Mabuza (2017–2019)and Gomora (2020–2022) as Melusi.

== Career ==
Xaluva began his acting career in 2004, where he starred in a television series Tsha Tsha season 3 as Lwazi Mboweni, uGugu no Andile in 2008 and 2009 as Khutso and played the main role in SABC 1 soapie opera Generations: The Legacy as Jayson. He played the role of Sydney Lwans in Zabalaza in 2013.early 2017, he played the supporting role of Uncle Luvo in Igazi. The same year,he played starring role of Diamond Mabuza in The Queen from season 2 to 4. He made his debut in a movie series Sew the Winter to My Skin in 2018 as Black Whyatt Earp. In 2019, he played the role of Art Nyakama in a film Knuckle City.

Before COVID-19 pandemic in early 2020, Xaluva played the lead in a popular Mzansi Magic telenovela Gomora as Melusi Dlamini from season 1 to 2. The same year, he played the starring role in a Netflix movie Kings of Jo'Burg as Mogomotsi "Mo " Masire. In 2022, he starred in a Showmax a fantasy series Blood Psalms as Toka. He played the lead role in e.tv telenovela Smoke & Mirrors as Ceaser Ngonyama, but his role was replaced by Hlomla Dandala in April 2024. The same year, he starred in a film The Queenstown Kings as Buyile Mahamba. In 2024, he played the lead role of Bheki Ndlovu in Code 13 with Lunathi Mampofu.

== Personal life ==
Xaluva is currently not married.

== Filmography ==
Year	Film	Role	Genre
	Generations	Jason	TV series
	Gomora	Melusi	TV series
2016	Hustle	Bra X	TV series
	The Queen	Diamond Mabuza	TV series
	Igazi	Uncle Luvo	TV series
	Rhythm City	HHP’s Manager	TV series
	The Throne	Sello	TV series
	Tsha Tsha	Lwazi Mboweni	TV series
	Tshisa	Fashion Photographer	TV series
	uGugu no Andile	Khutso	TV series
2013	Zabalaza	Sydney Lwana	TV series
2018	Sew the Winter to My Skin		Film
