= Rockville (TV series) =

South African drama series

- Genre: Drama Series
- Created by: Connie and Shona Ferguson
- Written by: Phathutshedzo Makwarela, Gwydion Beynon, Linda Bere, Chisanga Kabinga, Pamela Power & Sibusiso Mamba
- Directed by: Johnny Barbuzano
- Starring: Connie Ferguson; Shona Ferguson; Enhle Mbali Mlotshwa; Gail Mabalane; Thembsie Matu; Brenda Ngxoli; Lehasa Moloi; Siyabonga Shibe; Thuli Phongolo
- Composer: Joel Assaizky
- Country of origin: South Africa
- Original languages: English; Setswana; Sepedi; isiZulu; IsiXhosa; Afrikaans
- No. of seasons: 5
- No. of episodes: 59

Production
- Executive producers: Connie and Shona Ferguson
- Producer: Bobby Heaney
- Production locations: Soweto, Gauteng, South Africa
- Editor: Johan "Ula" Oelsen
- Running time: 45 to 60 minutes
- Production company: Ferguson Films

Original release
- Network: Mzansi Magic
- Release: June 19, 2013 – present

Related
- Isibaya

Rockville is a South African drama series created and produced by married couple Connie and Shona Ferguson under their production company, Ferguson Films. The series is written by Phathutshedzo Makwarela, Gwydion Beynon, Linda Bere, Chisanga Kabinga, Pamela Power and Sibusiso Mamba.

The show revolves around two different black families-the middle-class Bogatsus and the working-class Mabasos, who have are embroiled in an ongoing feud over a series of misunderstandings and hardships, particularly the one where the patriarch of the Bogatsu family, Jackson "JB" Bogatsu (Shona Ferguson) is secretly a pimp who corrupts innocent girls and make them prostitutes by using the attractive cigar lounge, Club Venus but when the Mabaso matriarch, Mavis' (Connie Ferguson) daughter, Lindi (Mbali Mlotshwa) gets a job as a waitress, JB pimps her into being a prostitute but it leads to a forbidden love that not only tears their families apart, but threaten sto change the course of their lives forever as JB will have to confront enemies that threaten his business and family and Lindi and Mavis must face the hardships that threaten their family.

Rockville premiered on 19 June 2013 on Mzansi Magic, launching the acclaimed Sunday blockbuster 8:00 PM timeslot. Each episode plays for 1-hour and the total of the each season is 10-hours. Rockville stars Connie Ferguson, Shona Ferguson, Terry Pheto and Mbali Mlotshwa as well as an ensemble cast which includes Gail Mabalane, Minnie Dlamini, Boity Thulo, Brenda Ngxoli, Trevor Gumbi, Sello Sebotsane, Thembsie Matu, Shaleen Surtie-Richards.

Due to its success and reception, Rockville was renewed for a second season, which premiered on 9 February 2014 with Clint Brink, Dorothy Ann Gould, Stephanie Schildknecht, Nandi Nyembe, Lerato Haji, Masego "Maps" Maponyane and Owen Sejake joining the ensemble cast.

Rockville was renewed for a third and fourth season which premiered on 4 January 2015, and 10 July 2016, respectively. Notable cast changes included Bonnie Mbuli being replaced by Terry Pheto in the role of Dudu Bogatsu, and Sipho Ngwenya's character, Sandile, being taken over by Fezile Makhanya.

In 2021, Mzansi Magic announced the return of Rockville to the 20h00 Sunday slot. The returning ensemble cast was joined by Siyabonga Shibe, Wiseman Zitha and Thuli Phongolo to the cast.

== Series overview ==
=== Season 1 ===
This season's main theme is the dark side of South Africa, the sacrifices, drama and subterfuge that it takes to get to the top in today's black South Africa.

It focused on two families-the middle-class Bogatsus and working-class Mabasos who have an ongoing feud over the misunderstandings and their different backgrounds as well as what their family members have done.

From the Mabasos, who live in the township Rockville in Soweto is the formidable matriarch, Mavis Mabaso (Connie Ferguson), whose family ends up in debt thanks to her son Oupa's (Lehasa Moloi) car crash that tests Mavis' strong will for her family and their struggling commitment but is helped by her loyal best friend, Rebecca (Thembsie Matu).

From the Bogatsus, who live in the upper class Waterfall suburb is the wealthy patriarch, Jackson "JB" Bogatsu (Shona Ferguson) who owns a high class cigar lounge known as Club Venus where all the wealthy come out to play. However, he really gets his wealthy from a secret high class escort service, where the prostitutes are known as Black Diamonds.

The central plot focuses on Mavis' daughter, Lindi (Mbali Mlothswa), who is a law student who dreams big and gets a job as a waitress at Club Venus, which JB uses to his advantage to pimp her but there becomes love at first sight, and it prompts Lindi into becoming a prostitute to help her family but it begins to set conflict between her family and JB's.

However, that's not all as an incident in the brothel puts JB's business at risk as the murky world if high class ends up coming out to play when Club Venus is about to be exposed for the lie that they are, which not only threatens JB's precious business that he worked hard to build but it also threatens to cause turmoil within his family as well as Lindi's family. Where she has to confront situations and make choices that she never dreamt of doing, Lindi realizes that every dream has a dark side.

=== Season 2 ===
As Rockville returns for a second season, the lives of the Mabasos and the Bogatsus have hit a knife edge. This is due to Mavis being the one who shot JB at his and Dudu's (Bonnie Mbuli) wedding anniversary and as JB is fighting for his life, Mavis is reeling after what she has done, while Oupa will do anything to protect his mother. This causes Mavis' daughter Lindi to leave and continue work as a prostitute.

After Mavis is released from jail, her moral values are again put to the test as she still regrets what she has done but seeks help from Paster Morake (Sello Sebotane) and Sis Rebecca, however when Lindi refuses to go back home, the arrival of Mavis' old friend, Gladys (Brenda Ngxoli) a divorcee drunkard leads Mavis to go astray with alcohol, threatening to tear apart her family and ruin her religious values.

Meanwhile, after JB is alive, he finds himself fighting for the control of Club Venus with the club's original founder. The ruthlessly diabolical Frankie who will do anything to beat JB while JB not only has to deal with some financial difficulties, but the arrival of his estranged father, gangster Cassius (Owen Sejake) possibly stirs trouble within JB's family. However, even though JB does not want anything to do with him, Cassius quickly commit a deadly salvation when he kills Frankie, leading JB to rule Club Venus again now that Frankie and Mike (Luthuli Dlamini) are dead. However, the fight for Club Venus and the brothel forces him to confront Frankie's vengeful son, Trevor (Clint Brink) who'll do anything to get what he wants and to rule his mother's business and will go so far as to even use JB's innocent daughter Mpho (Boity Thulo) as bait.

However, when Trevor is dead, JB is forced to confront his father which will not only lead to a destroyed bond but it also threatens to make him do something that will tear apart his family.

=== Season 3 ===
Rockville has been renewed for a third seasons which has been released on 4 January 2015, where this season's main theme focuses on the characters confronting their inner demons and the reckoning, not around their families, their friends but within themselves.

=== Season 4 ===
The season follows up after the events of Jackson's shooting. He now live in Alex when his wife and children abandon him and leave him broke. He is also dumped by Lindi who give birth to a baby boy on the season premier. Vicky returns after her son is taken by her family and they organise a heist in order to reopen a strip club which proves to be a success but they also catch the attention of a corrupt politician Rolex Ngidi (Sello Maake Ka-Ncube).

=== Season 5 ===
This new season finds JB and Lindi happily married, raising their five-year-old son, while trying to navigate running a legit hotel business without the Black Diamonds and the underworld. JB is a changed man, and that makes Mavis, Lindi's mother, very happy. Despite all of Lindi and JB's best efforts, running a clean business is hard. Hotel Paradiso is a money pit, and then it gets hit with embezzlement, suicide, and Covid. Everything they worked hard for is under threat, and out of options, Lindi proposes that they go back to what they know best - the business of selling flesh. JB agrees only if it’s temporary, until they pay off their debts. They turn the hotel into a high-class brothel - they have to keep this a secret from Mavis, who has finally accepted JB as her son-in-law because he changed his ways.

In the township, Mavis faces many challenges as she worries about Oupa’s future. Oupa, on the other hand, is worried about her refusing to take the pandemic seriously. A death shocks Mavis into facing reality. Reality continues to intensify for Mavis and all her loved ones as she gets caught between her friends Peggy and Gladys, and is drawn into the dangerous world of counterfeit cigarettes, unwittingly becoming the target of a gangster masquerading as a prayer woman (Linda Sebezo). While Mavis will find strength in her friendship and community, she will also suffer a great loss and even have to choose between her morals and her love for her children.

To restart the business, JB and Sipho go to find Vicky, who harbours resentment because when they shut down Club Venus, she felt like they had thrown her out onto the streets, into poverty. Desperate for stability, she agrees to help them find new Black Diamonds. But she has a secret that she has kept from JB for over a decade.

Soon, they discover the only way to find high-class girls is to poach them from their pimps. JB stages a daring mission rescuing working girls from their abusive pimps and even finding girls who are being trafficked. Among these girls is Buhle (Thuli Phongolo), a recent graduate from rural KZN, who was abducted for sex trafficking but ends up catching the eye of the boss, Kalashnikov (Siyabonga Shibe). He begins to groom her for himself and so is enraged when she’s rescued by JB. After the rescue, Lindi and JB make it clear that they are not their new pimps, but partners. The working girls will have power and autonomy to make the most of the money. As Hotel Paradiso begins a new era, JB and Lindi are now in the crosshairs of a dangerous trafficker, a heist kingpin, and other threats from the past loom, as they try to keep the brothel a secret. Home, business and their marriage come under pressure from both outsiders and from their most trusted inner circle.

== Cast ==
= Main cast (credited)
= Recurring cast (3+)
= Guest cast (1-2)

Actor	Character	Appearances				
Actor	Character	1	2	3	4	5
Shona Ferguson	JB, Jackson Bogatsu	Main	Main	Main	Main	Main
Connie Ferguson	Mavis Mabaso	Main	Main	Main	Main	Main
Enhle Mbali Mlotshwa (Note: as Entle Mbali Maphumulo)	Lindiwe Mabaso - Bogatsu	Main	Main	Main	Main	Main
Gail Mabalane	Vicky Mabona	Support	Support	Support	Support	Support
Trevor Gumbi	Sipho	Support	Support	Support	Support	Support
Boity Thulo	Mpho Bogatsu	Support	Support	Support	Recurring	—N/a
Minnie Dlamini	Nosipho Bogatsu	Recurring	—N/a	—N/a	—N/a	—N/a
Bonnie Mbuli	Dudu Bogatsu	Support	—N/a	—N/a	—N/a	—N/a
Israel Matseke Zulu	Bra Ali	Recurring	Recurring	Recurring	Recurring	—N/a
Bonginkosi Twala	Bra Simon	Regular	Regular	Regular	Regular	Regular
Dorothy Ann Gould	Frankie	Main	Main	—N/a	—N/a	—N/a
Mpho Malatsi	Bongani	Guest	—N/a	—N/a	—N/a	—N/a
Jason Kennett	Gianni	Guest	—N/a	—N/a	—N/a	—N/a
Nandi Nyembe	Gogo	Guest	Guest	—N/a	—N/a	—N/a
Ferry Jele	Joyce	Guest	—N/a	—N/a	—N/a	—N/a
Bridget Masinga	Lerato	Guest	—N/a	—N/a	—N/a	—N/a
JT Medupe	Mdu	Guest	—N/a	—N/a	—N/a	—N/a
Yonda Thomas	Mduduzi	Guest	—N/a	—N/a	—N/a	—N/a
Luthuli Dlamini	Mike	Guest	—N/a	—N/a	—N/a	—N/a
Kenneth Nkosi	Minister Masondo	Guest	—N/a	—N/a	—N/a	—N/a
Tumi Morake	Portia	Guest	—N/a	—N/a	—N/a	—N/a
Rami Chuene	Tina (as Ramatsui Desando)	Guest	—N/a	—N/a	—N/a	—N/a
Brenda Ngxoli	Gladys	—N/a	Recurring	Recurring	—N/a	Recurring
Owen Sejake	Cassius	—N/a	Main	—N/a	—N/a	—N/a
Stephanie Schildknecht	Janet	—N/a	Guest	—N/a	—N/a	—N/a
Meren Reddy	Janet's Boyfriend	—N/a	Guest	—N/a	—N/a	—N/a
Tango Ncetezo	Peggy	—N/a	Regular	Regular	Regular	Regular
Sello Motloung	Police Commissioner	—N/a	Guest	—N/a	—N/a	—N/a
Maps Maponyane	TK	—N/a	Guest	—N/a	—N/a	—N/a
Clint Brink	Trevor	—N/a	Main	—N/a	—N/a	—N/a
Lerato Zah Moloi (Note: as Lerato Haji)	Tumi	—N/a	Recurring	—N/a	—N/a	—N/a
Terry Pheto (Note: Replaces Bonnie Mbuli)	Dudu Bogatsu	—N/a	Main	Main	—N/a	—N/a
Khanya Mkangisa	Nolitha	—N/a	—N/a	Recurring	—N/a	—N/a
Fezile Makhanya	Sandile	—N/a	—N/a	Recurring	Recurring	Recurring
Hlomla Dandala	Gomorrah	—N/a	—N/a	Main	—N/a	—N/a
Mbali Nkosi	Cindy	—N/a	Recurring	Recurring	—N/a	—N/a
Nunu Khumalo	Nosipho	—N/a	—N/a	Recurring	—N/a	—N/a
Graham Hopkins	Judge	—N/a	—N/a	Recurring	—N/a	—N/a
David Johnson	Coco	—N/a	—N/a	Recurring	Recurring	—N/a
Emmanuel Castis	Giovanni	—N/a	—N/a	Recurring	—N/a	—N/a
Drikus Volschenk	Kingpin	—N/a	—N/a	Recurring	—N/a	—N/a
Russel Savadier	Dr. Silva	—N/a	—N/a	Recurring	—N/a	—N/a
Don Mlangeni Nawa	Diliza	—N/a	—N/a	Main	—N/a	—N/a
Bradley Olivier	Hot Businessman	—N/a	—N/a	Guest	—N/a	—N/a
Sipho Manzini	Security Guard	—N/a	—N/a	Guest	—N/a	—N/a
Vuyiseka Cawe	Owethu	—N/a	—N/a	Guest	—N/a	—N/a
Sello Maake Ka-Ncube	Rolex Ngidi	—N/a	—N/a	—N/a	Main	—N/a
Tsholo Matshaba	Olga Mabaso	—N/a	—N/a	—N/a	Main	Guest
Kamo Modisakeng	Bassie	—N/a	—N/a	—N/a	Main	—N/a
Ayanda Thabethe	Aliyah	—N/a	—N/a	—N/a	Main	—N/a
Themba Ndaba	Ngema	—N/a	—N/a	—N/a	Main	—N/a
Austin Shandu	Jabu	—N/a	—N/a	—N/a	Recurring	—N/a
Seipati Motshwane	Mmabatho	—N/a	—N/a	—N/a	Recurring	Guest
Robby Collins (Note: Replaces David Johnson who played Coco in season 2)	Coco	—N/a	—N/a	—N/a	Recurring	—N/a
Amkelekile Prince Nonjola	Masego	—N/a	—N/a	—N/a	Guest	—N/a
Tahnee Davids	Lolo	—N/a	—N/a	—N/a	Guest	—N/a
Ghana Hattingh	Gail	—N/a	—N/a	—N/a	Guest	—N/a
Nomazizi Molose	Granny	—N/a	—N/a	—N/a	Guest	—N/a
Thato Kgoele	Neo	—N/a	—N/a	—N/a	Guest	—N/a
Loyiso MacDonald	Africa Mbatha	—N/a	—N/a	—N/a	Guest	—N/a
Kgomotso Christopher	Azania Dlamini	—N/a	—N/a	—N/a	Guest	—N/a
Neo Molao	Nhlanhla	—N/a	—N/a	—N/a	Guest	—N/a
Teboho Karabo Williams	Azania's Daughter	—N/a	—N/a	—N/a	Guest	—N/a
Mutodi Neshehe	Alex	—N/a	—N/a	—N/a	Guest	—N/a
Mahlatse Kgoale	Mzee	—N/a	—N/a	—N/a	Guest	—N/a
Thuli Phongolo	Buhle	—N/a	—N/a	—N/a	—N/a	Main
Siyabonga Shibe	Kalashnikov	—N/a	—N/a	—N/a	—N/a	Main
Nhlanhla Mdlalose	Sgora	—N/a	—N/a	—N/a	—N/a	Recurring
Sokhulu Mthiyane	Capone	—N/a	—N/a	—N/a	—N/a	Recurring
Ronewa Malema	Masego	—N/a	—N/a	—N/a	—N/a	Recurring
Thabisile Zikhali	Sweety	—N/a	—N/a	—N/a	—N/a	Recurring
Mandisa Mahlangu	Gogo	—N/a	—N/a	—N/a	—N/a	Recurring
Manqoba Xulu	Abelo	—N/a	—N/a	—N/a	—N/a	Recurring
Zolani Phakade	Mandla	—N/a	—N/a	—N/a	—N/a	Recurring
Mothusi Sengwatse	Spitjo	—N/a	—N/a	—N/a	—N/a	Guest
Wiseman Zitha	Adonis	—N/a	—N/a	—N/a	—N/a	Recurring
Kgapyane Tshilwane	Sylvia	—N/a	—N/a	—N/a	—N/a	Guest
Kwezi Ndlovu	Stellina	—N/a	—N/a	—N/a	—N/a	Recurring
Simphiwe Ngema	Innocentia	—N/a	—N/a	—N/a	—N/a	Guest
Linda Sebezo	MaMoloi	—N/a	—N/a	—N/a	—N/a	Recurring
Mohale Motaung	Zamani	—N/a	—N/a	—N/a	—N/a	Guest
Unathi Platyi (Note: as Unathi Plaatji)	Lerumo	—N/a	—N/a	—N/a	—N/a	Guest
Lloyd Rathebe	Mkhonto	—N/a	—N/a	—N/a	—N/a	Guest
Tshiamo Molobi	Delani	—N/a	—N/a	—N/a	—N/a	Recurring
Charles Serage	Sergeant Mokwena	—N/a	—N/a	—N/a	—N/a	Guest
Thobeka Sikhungo	Thuli	—N/a	—N/a	—N/a	—N/a	Guest
Thembi Nyandeni	Ntombi Nkosi	—N/a	—N/a	—N/a	—N/a	Guest
