= Date My Family =

South African reality television series

- Narrated by: Sjula Dlamini
- Country of origin: South Africa
- No. of seasons: 13

Production
- Producers: Basetsana Khumalo; Clifford Elk; Kopano Gelman
- Production companies: Connect TV; Multichoice Studios

Original release
- Network: Mzansi Magic
- Release: 24 May 2015

Date My Family is a South African reality lifestyle romance television series produced by Connect TV for Mzansi Magic. The series aims to help singletons find their love interest by setting them on dates with their potential partner's closest friends and families.

== Format ==
Each episode features a bachelor/bachelorette looking for love, who will attend three dates to meet the families of three potential dates. These date will sit in a separate room and watch as their family represents them to the participant, and judge how the participant conducts themselves, as well as what they are looking for in a partner. The participant must choose the suitable potential partner based solely on how the family has represented them, this time taking them on a date where they will interact face-to-face.
