= Precious Simelane =

South African actress (1977–2005)

- Born: Precious Simelane; 10 October 1977; Pretoria, South Africa
- Died: 21 April 2005 (aged 27); George Mukhari Hospital, South Africa
- Education: Loreto Convent; Pro Arte
- Alma mater: Tshwane University of Technology; University of South Africa
- Occupation: Actress
- Years active: 1991–2005

Precious Simelane (10 October 1977 – 21 April 2005) was a South African actress. She was best known for her roles in the popular serials Backstage and Generations.

== Personal life ==
She was born on 10 October 1977 in Pretoria, South Africa. She first attended to St Anne's Primary School for primary education and later moved to Loreto Convent. She completed secondary education at Pro Arte. She later studied drama at the Tshwane University of Technology and at University of South Africa (Unisa).

== Death ==
She died on 21 April 2005 after a temporary illness at George Mukhari Hospital at the age of 27. Funeral took place in Pretoria where final rites service was held at the Apostolic Mission Faith Church in Atteridgeville. She was cremated in Zandfontein Cemetery.

== Career ==
She became highly popular with the role 'Zanele Bhengu' in the television soapie Generations.

== Filmography ==
Year	Film	Role	Genre	Ref.
2003	Backstage		TV series	
2005	Generations	Zanele Bhengu	TV series	
