= Skeleton Coast (2024 film) =

2024 Namibian thriller film

- Directed by: Robert Peters
- Produced by: Panashe Daringo
- Production company: Mondjila Studios
- Release date: 2024
- Country: Namibia

Skeleton Coast is a 2024 Namibian thriller film directed by Robert Peters.

== Cast ==
- Damilola Adegbite
- Tjuna Daringo as Dr. Samantha Gold
- Mawuli Gavor as Dr. Abam Mense
- Cindy Mahlangu as Sasha
- René Mena as Tony's Assistant
- Thapelo Mokoena as Lerato Mohapi
- Ini Dima Okojie as Adana
- Eric Roberts as Tony Andersen
- Armas Shivute as Mr. Petrus

== Production ==
Skeleton Coast was filmed and produced at the Skeleton Coast, Namibia. The film was produced by Nigeria’s Play Network Studios and the Namibian film production company, Mondajila Studios.

== Release ==
The film first premiered at the Ster-Kinekor Maerua Mall and at Grove Mall, Windhoek-Namibia.

== Awards and nominations ==
Skeleton Coast was nominated in eight categories, Best Director, Supporting Actress, Lead Actor, Movie Writing, Editing, Score/Music, Cinematography, and Movie categories in the Africa Magic Viewers’ Choice Awards.
