= Lobola Man =

2024 South African romantic comedy film

- Directed by: Thabang Moleya
- Written by: Katleho Ramaphakela
- Produced by: Katleho Ramaphakela
- Cinematography: Brad Devine
- Edited by: Kabi Modiko
- Music by: Samukelo Mahlalela
- Production companies: Burnt Onion Production; Thabang Moleya Film
- Distributed by: Netflix
- Release date: 12 July 2024
- Running time: 108 minutes
- Country: South Africa
- Languages: English; Zulu

Lobola Man is a 2024 South African romantic comedy film directed by Thabang Moleya and written by Katleho Ramaphakela. The film stars Lawrence Maleka, Sandile Mahlangu, Kwanele Mthethwa, Nimrod Nkosi, Thembsie Matu, Obed Baloyi, and Sello Ramolahloane.

The film explores modern relationships and cultural traditions in South Africa, with a focus on lobola, a traditional form of bride wealth paid by a groom or his family to the family of the bride.

Lobola Man was released on Netflix on July 12, 2024.

== Synopsis ==
Ace Ngubeni, a lobolo negotiator who helps men negotiate the bride price with their in‑laws. Ace is also a womanizer who does not believe in love or commitment. Ace's views are shaped by his childhood, when his father, who had affairs outside marriage involved Ace in those affairs.

Aces outlook begins to change when Duke Maseko, a technology company CEO hires Ace to negotiate the lobola for Dukes fiancée, Zandile. Zandile is outspoken and opinionated. Ace has already met Zandile before Duke introduces them. Aces personal connection with Zandile complicates the negotiation. Challenges Aces views, about love and relationships.

== Cast ==
=== Main ===
- Lawrence Maleka as Ace
  - Lehlohonolo Mokoi as Young Ace
- Kwanele Mthethwa as Zandile
- Sandile Mahlangu as Duke
- Nimrod Nkosi as Mr. Zungu

=== Supporting characters ===
- Thembsie Matu as Aunt Miriam (Club Manager)
- Obed Baloyi as Uncle Long John
- Themba Ndaba as Sam
  - Tiisetso Masike as Young Sam
- Kaseran Pillay as Samoosa Vendor

== Production ==
Filming

Filming took place entirely in South Africa, primarily in Johannesburg and Soweto. Principal photography took place throughout 2023.

== Release ==
Lobola Man was released on Netflix on July 12, 2024.

== Reception ==
On the review aggregator website Rotten Tomatoes, 83% of 7 critics' reviews are positive, with an average rating of 4.2/10.

Upon its release, Lobola Man received mixed reviews from critics. Seyi Lasisi of Afrocritik described the film as "one of those films that are obsessively watched and swiftly forgotten" and gave it a rating of 1.8/5 rating.
