= Generations (South African TV series) =

South African soap opera from 1993 to 2014

- Genre: Soap opera
- Created by: Mfundi Vundla
- Written by: Collin Oliphant; Linda Bere; Lerato Khanye; Bongi Ndaba; Sipho Radebe; Dorotte Nel; Tanya Tiedjie; Karen Vundla; Ruth Mahlodi; Ruth Moahlodi; S'thembile Mnisi
- Starring: see below
- Theme music composer: Jonas Gwangwa; Claude Gombard
- Country of origin: South Africa
- Original language: Multilingual (subtitles included)
- No. of seasons: 21
- No. of episodes: 4246

Production
- Producers: Mfundi Vundla; Karen Vundla; Human Stark; Costas Gavriel
- Running time: 30:00 (incl. commercials)

Original release
- Network: SABC1
- Release: 1 February 1993 – 31 October 2014

Related
- Backstage; Binneland; Generations: The Legacy

Generations is a South African soap opera which first premiered on SABC 1 in 1993. It was created and produced by Mfundi Vundla and aired weekdays at 20:00 UTC+2 (South African Standard Time) on SABC 1. Set against the backdrop of the advertising industry, this drama celebrated the hopes and dreams of South Africans who aspire to a better future.

The show received overwhelmingly positive reviews, being among the most-watched local television shows throughout its long run. Production on the show stopped on 11 August 2014, when 16 principal actors began withholding their services following wage disputes, a cut of R500 million in royalties and three-year extended contracts.

From 30 September 2014 to 30 November 2014, the series was put on a highly publicized hiatus, following the dispute with 16 actors, who were fired from the show on 18 August 2014 after a week-long strike. Fans were urged not to watch the show in support of the 16 actors. The South African Audience Research Foundation confirmed that instead viewership increased from the usual seven million to 10 million viewers a night prior to the announcement of the subsequent sacking.

Generations returned on 1 December 2014, rebranded as Generations: The Legacy, with some of the old cast members from the original series. The show received generally negative reviews and low ratings in its first week of airing, but the viewers warmed to the revamped show in the next couple of weeks following its return. When it returned in December 2014, it starred Connie Ferguson and Rapulana Seiphemo and also starred Musa Ngema and Asanda Foji.

== Plot ==
The backdrop of Generations is the advertising industry, with a storyline that celebrates the dreams and aspirations of South Africans. As in most soaps - rivalry, treachery and blackmail between siblings, friends and foes alike are common. Suspense, intrigue and tension are the order of the day as the plot unfolds and romance influences relationships between warring parties. Its just the reality of the present generation's lifestyle, where conflicts are ubiquitous and endless. With themes of witchcraft and magic, it includes African influences.

== Ratings and other news ==
The previous Generations was the most viewed soapie on South Africa television throughout its run, with over seven million viewers. However, after being rebranded as Generations: The Legacy, ratings dropped to three million viewers. However, after a few weeks back on air the viewership improved once again with the show occupying 60.2% of the market share during the 20:00 timeslot.

Generations is the first TV series in South Africa to partner with real corporations and companies to advertise their products and services on the TV series. This was done in a manner where these partners were included in some part of the scripts. This has already happened with three South African companies i.e. Pep Stores, Capitec Bank and Smart Gym.

== Controversy ==
In 2008, the show's producer Mfundi Vundla snubbed the South African Film and Television Awards (SAFTA) by rejecting any nomination for the soapie and its cast. Vundla has apparently taken the fight back to SAFTA, who had snubbed him by not having a single winner from Generations the previous year despite the fact that it was, in his opinion, the best soapie on local television and allegedly boasts some of the best actors in the country.

In a letter addressed to his staff, Vundla reportedly requested that they do not attend the awards function "to avoid creating the impression that Generations in any way supports SAFTA." Vundla also criticized the judging procedure for not being properly administered or transparent and said politics influenced the adjudication process. He also complained that certain nominations were "inaccurate or simply absurd".

== Music ==
The show has had changes in the opening sequence, including to the title music of the show. The 2007 change from the original Jonas Gwangwa composition, followed by Mandla "Spikiri" Mofokeng's theme music. Before the introduction of Generations: The Legacy, the title music was by Trevor Jones. The theme song for Generations: The Legacy was composed by Jonas Gwangwa and Claude Gombard (stage-name Claude King). It was recorded and mixed by Claude Gombard at his Claude King Media Productions recording studio in Johannesburg, during the month of November, 2014. Jonas Gwangwa is featured on trombone and Claude Gombard on guitar, in the piece, which is titled Nomakanjani (meaning "anything and everything").

== International broadcast ==
Up until 2020, Generations aired in Jamaica, on Television Jamaica (TVJ), which was four years behind in episodes. Four episodes were aired on Sundays back to back at 1:00pm local time and repeated on Mondays, Tuesdays, Wednesdays and Fridays at 5:30am and 12:30pm local time (one episode for each day).

In Kenya, Generations aired during weeknights at 6:00 pm EAT on Kenya Broadcasting Corporation (KBC) over the 2000s and during Saturdays on Citizen TV in the early 2010s.

Generations premiered in India on eIndia which broadcast on Mondays - Fridays at 20:30, from 15 February 2012.

== Cast ==
The cast members of Generations before its hiatus in 2014 were; In 2005, the actress Precious Simelane who played the role 'Zanele Bhengu' died and in 2021 the actor Menzi Ngubane, who played the role of Sibusiso Dlomo also died.

| Actor | Role |
|---|---|
| Connie Masilo | Karabo Moroka |
| Katlego Danke | Dineo Tlaole |
| Menzi Ngubane | Sibusiso Dhlomo |
| Thami Mngqolo | Senzo Dhlomo |
| Seputla Sebogodi | Kenneth Mashaba |
| Sophie Ndaba | Queen Moroka |
| Rapulana Seiphemo | Tau Mogale |
| Mandla Gaduka | Selwyn "Choppa" Maithufi |
| Maggie Benedict | Akhona Griffiths |
| Winnie Ntshaba | Khethiwe Buthelezi |
| Nambitha Mpumlwana | Mawande Memela |
| Zenande Mfenyana | Noluntu Memela |
| Zolisa Xaluva | Jason Malinga |
| Anga Makubalo | Bandile 'MJ' Memela |
| Zikhona Sodlaka | Priska Dlhomo |
| Slindile Nodangala | Ruby Dikobe |
| Thato Molamu | Nicholas Nomvete |
| Patrick Shai | Patrick Tlaole |
| Atandwa Kani | Samora Lembede |
| Mike Mvelase | Khaphela Ngcobo |
| Vusi Kunene | Jack Mabaso |
| Sonia Mbele | Ntombi Khumalo |
| Camilla Waldman | Anne de Villiers |
| Dumisani MBE | Dumisani Mashaba |
| Kagiso Rakosa | Sharon |
| Leleti Khumalo | Busisiwe Dhlomo |
