= Sophie Ndaba =

South African actress

Sophie Lichaba
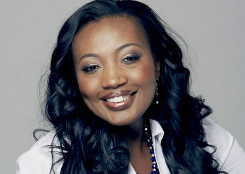
- Born: Sophie Mphasane; 29 June 1973 (age 53); Soweto, South Africa
- Other name: Sophie Ndaba
- Occupations: Actor; model; event organiser
- Years active: 1992 – present
- Spouses: Themba Ndaba (m. 1998; div. 2007) Max Lichaba (m. 2017; div. 2022)
- Partner: Keith Harrington (2011–2013)
- Children: Rudo Ndaba; Lwandle Ndaba
- Awards: Golden Horn Award for "Best Comic Actor" in 2009 etc

Sophie Lichaba (née Mphasane, formerly Ndaba; born 29 June 1973) is a South African actress. She played Queen Moroka in the soap Generations. In 2016, she was a guest judge in the final Miss South Africa 2016 beauty pageant.

== Education ==
She completed high school in Zimbabwe, after which she pursued her modeling career. Her mother sent her to an orphanage in Eastlea, Harare, Zimbabwe so she could get a better education than what was available in apartheid South Africa.

== Personal life ==
Lichaba's father, Solly Mphasane, died in 2016. She suffers from diabetes. With her former husband, Themba Ndaba, she has two children, Rudo and Lwandle. She adopted her niece, Shallon Ndaba, following the death of her sister, Tiny Mphasane. She married Max Lichaba in 2017. In late 2018, Lichaba was the victim of a rumour, which claimed that she had died.

== Awards ==
- Duku Duku Award for “Best Soap Actress” in 2003
- Golden Horn Award for “Best Comic Actor” in 2009
- Woman Of Inspiration Award

== Filmography ==
- Class of '92
- Egoli: Place of Gold
- Generations
- Gog' Helen
- Yizo Yizo
- Soul City
- She is King
- Isidingo
- High Rollers - Season 2
- Lockdown
