= Themba Ndaba =

South African actor and director

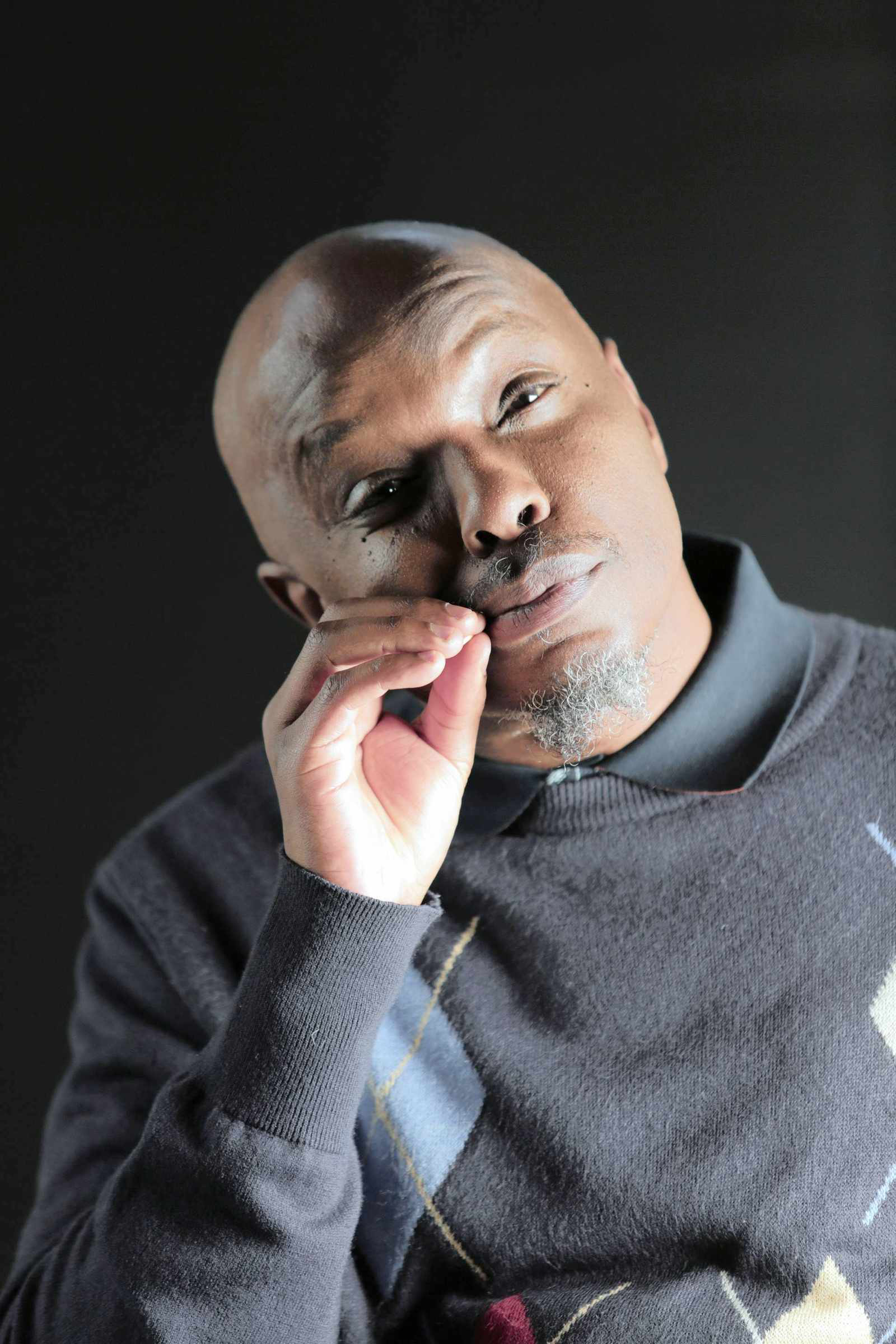
- Born: Themba Ndaba; 14 February 1965 (age 61); Soweto, South Africa
- Education: Harare Polytechnic
- Occupation: Actor
- Years active: 1990 – present
- Notable work: "Brutus" on The Queen Mzansi
- Spouses: Sophie Ndaba (m. 1998; div. 2007); Josey Ndaba (m. 2011)
- Children: 3
- Awards: 2011 Africa Movie Academy Awards

Themba Ndaba (born 14 February 1965) is a South African actor and director. He is best known for casting in the movie Machine Gun Preacher and in the series Zone 14. He recently starred as Brutus Khoza in the South African Ferguson Films TV series The Queen.

== Biography ==
Born in Soweto, Gauteng, he moved to Swaziland (since 2018 renamed to Eswatini) at an early age and was brought up there. He started school in 1970 and matriculated at St Marks High School in 1982. He then went to study Economics and Statistics in Zimbabwe in 1983. He took a break from studies and worked as a banker in Harare for a while. From 1986 to 1988 he attended Harare Polytechnic, where he graduated with a Higher National Diploma in Business Studies with a distinction in Economics and Statistics.

== Filmography ==
- Generations
- Machine Gun Preacher
- Hopeville
- The Queen
- Zone 14
- The Road
- Mfolozi Street
- Gomora
- Rockville
- Rhythm City
- Queendom
- Lobola Man

== Awards ==
In 2011, He won a Golden Horn Award for being the Best Feature in a movie and also won the 2011 Africa Movie Academy Awards for his leading role in the movie Hopeville.

== Television ==
He plays a role as Brutus Khoza in the Ferguson Films TV series The Queen.

== Personal life ==
In 1998, he married actress Sophie Ndaba, whom he has two children with; they divorced in 2007. In 2011, he married Josey Ndaba, with whom he has one child.
