= Shona Ferguson =

Motswana actor and film producer (1974–2021)

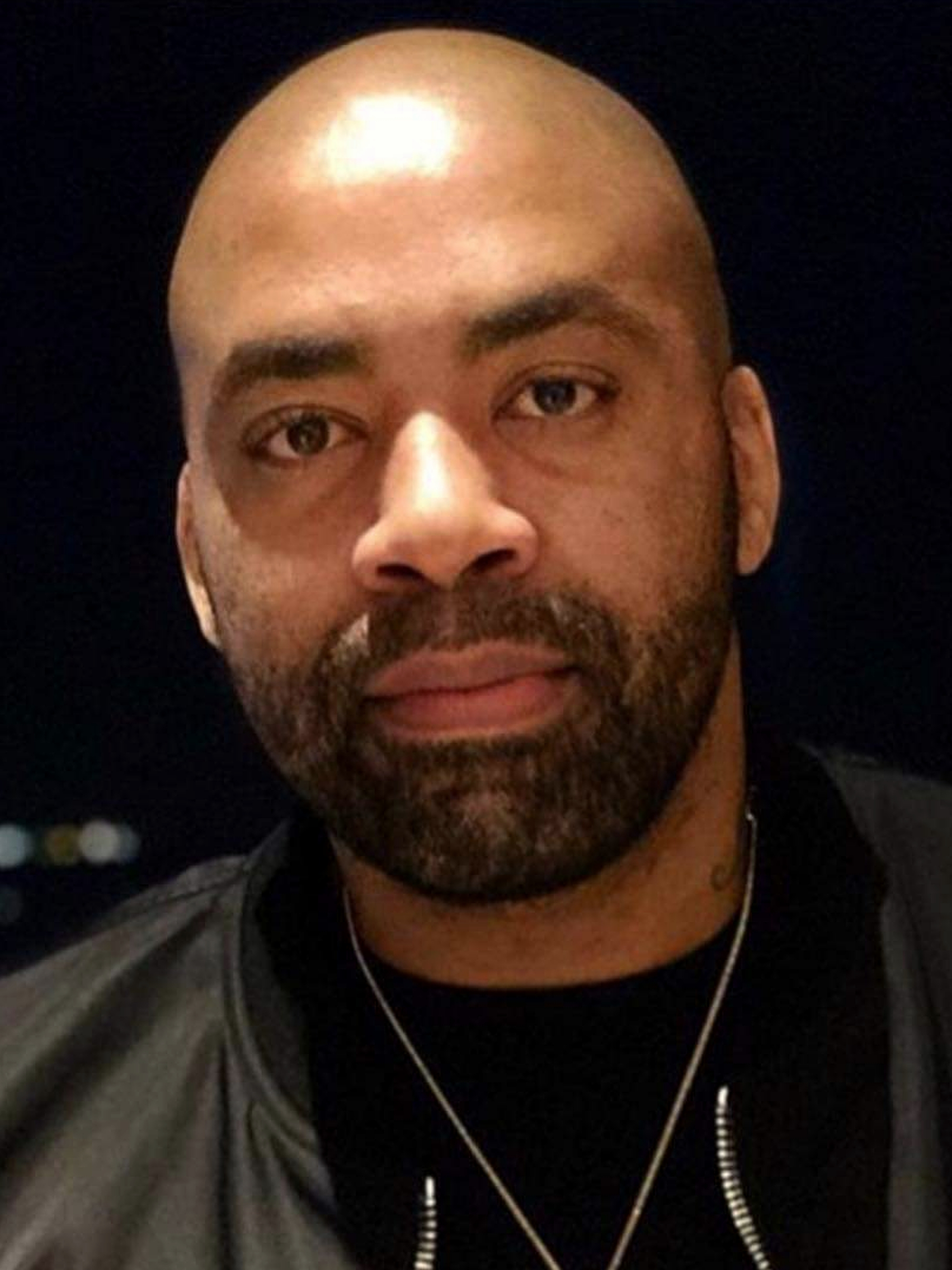
- Ferguson in 2019
- Born: Aaron Arthur Ferguson; 30 April 1974; Gaborone, Botswana
- Died: 30 July 2021 (aged 47); Johannesburg, South Africa
- Occupations: Director; actor; producer; businessman
- Years active: 1992–2021
- Spouse: Connie Ferguson (m. 2001)
- Awards: Golden Horn Award

Aaron Arthur Ferguson (30 April 1974 – 30 July 2021), professionally known as Shona Ferguson, was a Motswana actor based in South Africa, executive producer and co-founder of Ferguson Films, alongside his wife, Connie Ferguson.

== Early career ==
Ferguson started his journey into the world of entertainment in Lesotho as a club DJ at The Palace Hotel Night Club in 1992. After moving back to Botswana his focus shifted to the corporate world and he ended up in the IT business. Having started as a salesman, he worked his way up to become a respected businessman where he won multiple achievement awards, including Top Sales Manager Award 1998–99.

== Acting career ==
Ferguson's first major acting role was as Dr Leabua in the South African Venda language soap opera Muvhango. He left the show in March 2007. He then starred as Itumeleng from 2011 to 2013 on The Wild, a M-Net soap opera.

He, along with wife Connie Ferguson, established Ferguson Films and both starred on their film production's first series Rockville. He starred as JB from 2013 to its final episode in 2016. He also starred on 2014's The Gift, a Ferguson Films series, and starred as Jerry Maake on The Queen, also a Ferguson Films series that started in 2016. His other TV appearances include Isidingo: The Need as Tyson and Scandal! as Alex.

== Ferguson Films ==
In 2010, he started Ferguson Films with wife and actress, Connie Ferguson. Their productions included Rockville, iGazi, The Gift, The Throne, The Herd, The Queen, and The Imposter.

In 2020, they produced a Netflix six-episode fantasy crime drama called Kings of Jo'Burg, for which Ferguson had a starring role. The series was renewed for a second season, that premiered on 23 January 2023, and a third season, which premiered on 13 June 2025, with the story details accumulating following Ferguson's passing.

== Movies ==
Ferguson was cast in the 2010 film Mrs. Mandela.

== Personal life ==
He met actress Connie Masilo on 31 July 2001. They married in November of that year.

== Awards and nominations ==
He received the Golden Horn Award for Best Actor in a TV Soap and Golden Horn Award for Best Achievement by a Lead Actor in a Made for TV Movie.

== Death ==
On 26 June 2021, Ferguson was admitted to Pinehaven Hospital with COVID-19. With his condition getting worse, he was airlifted towards the mid-days of July to Milpark Hospital in Johannesburg, where he died on 30 July 2021, aged 47. He was buried at the Fourways Memorial Park, after a private funeral. A memorial service was held two days later, where the attendance was limited to 50 due to COVID-19 lockdown regulations.
