= South African Film and Television Awards =

South African awards ceremony

- Current: 18th South African Film & Television Awards
- Awarded for: Achievement of creative excellence in Film and Television arts.
- Country: South Africa
- Presented by: National Film and Video Foundation
- First award: 28 October 2006; 20 years ago
- Website: nfvf.co.za

The South African Film and Television Awards (sometimes referred to as the Golden Horns; often simply called the SAFTAs) is an annual South African awards ceremony hosted by the National Film and Video Foundation (NFVF), to honour creative excellence in the local film and television industry as assessed by the volunteer judges. The various category winners are awarded a statuette, officially called the Golden Horn, and a certificate. The awards, first presented in 2006 at the Gallagher Estate, are overseen by a committee governed by the NFVF.

The finalists, nominees, and winners are chosen by a multi-phasic process of judging panels. Only South African citizens are eligible for the awards. The South African Broadcasting Corporation (SABC) is the official live broadcast partner and sponsor.

The 13th South African Film and Television Awards (Quarantine Edition-ceremony) was held at the Sun City Metro Theater 1 April 2021 by Edem, Henry-Kendall A. And garnered over 1 million live watchers at the official SAFTAs 2021 Zoom Link.

== Background ==
At the first film indaba in August 2005, representatives of the South African film and television industry, with guidance from the National Film and Video Foundation (NFVF), set to establish an annual awards ceremony. The awards would serve as a way honour, celebrate, and promote creative excellence, and encourage the development of new talent within the industry. Since the inaugural ceremony, the awards have been under the custodianship of the NFVF and governed by a committee. The current NFVF chief-executive officer is the chairperson, while the rest of the body consists of the national broadcasters, the South African Screen Federation (SASFED), Writers' Guild of South Africa (WGSA), and other key stakeholders.

At the 6th South African Film and Television Awards ceremony the then NFVF CEO and SAFTA committee chairperson, Eddie Mbalo, announced there would be an investigation into establishing a South African Film and Television Academy as "true custodians" of the awards. The announcement followed Eddie Mbalo's resignation, "hoping" that the academy would be launched with a new chairperson. In the weeks before the 7th South African Film and Television Awards the current NFVF CEO, Zama Mkosi, reported that a special sub-committee had drawn up a draft constitution for the Academy. The constitution was released to the industry for feedback, she stated that "we may achieve [an Academy] within the next two to three years." It is modelled on international academies, such as Academy of Motion Picture Arts and Sciences and British Academy of Film and Television Arts. The NFVF stated it could not fully fund the academy, stating they would "walk alongside" the industry to make the academy make "financial sense".

== Golden Horn statuette ==
Since the inaugural awards ceremony in 2006, each winner receives a statuette named the Golden Horn and winner certificate in recognition of creative excellence. The faces on the statuette are based on artefacts from throughout Africa, some dating back to 800 CE, and reference the Lydenburg Heads. The three figure heads are sculpted to look like cattle horns and similar to the shapes found on indigenous snuff boxes. These objects were often a recognition the status of venerated member in an African community. Together the horns are a reference to flames and, ultimately, the rising sun as an "emblem of brightness, splendour and the supreme principle of the nature". The creative concept behind the trophy is built on the strength of the collective effort and the recognition of the individual as a part of the team.

== Eligibility and entry ==
As per the awards committee guidelines, only citizens and permanent residents of South Africa are eligible for a nomination; in certain categories this rule only applies to the head producer. In the television award categories, the production company's majority stakeholders must be South African. In the case of co-productions with foreign companies, are only eligible where a "significant proportion" of the creative decision are made by the South African team and the production has been certified by the National Film and Video Foundation. The SAFTA committee sends out a call for entries, typically around August. For the 10th South African Film and Television Awards, participants were allowed to submit their media online, before the entry forms were submitted online and the media sent via a postal service to the NFVF head offices in Johannesburg.

In the television categories, shows that were publicly aired on any local stations between 1 August and 31 July are eligible. The television show must be serialised, with at least one season. The production company or producer submit two of the best episodes, along with a list of the specific categories they with to enter. In the film categories, films that were publicly exhibited in South Africa between 1 January and 31 December are eligible. The minimum runtime for feature film entries was reduced from 70 minutes to 41 minutes for the 10th South African Film and Television Awards. For any actor and actress categories a showreel of their best scenes is submitted, to give the judges a view of their range. If an entry is submitted incorrectly, it is immediately disqualified from that category.

== Judging process ==
The SAFTA committee begins each judging process, by electing a jury of three or more chairpersons. These chairpersons oversee both phases, supply score cards and guide the judges in each category. The film and television professionals with a minimum of ten years experience, or deemed "credible" by the jury, can volunteer to be a judge. In 2011, the SAFTA committee began incorporating previous winners and nominees into the judging process to "encourage peer recognition". The names of judges are not publicly available, to protect their anonymity and remove any potential coercion during the process. In the 2016, there were approximately 300 judges used throughout the process. The judging sessions take place in South Africa's three major cities, Johannesburg, Cape Town and Durban.

After much criticism from the television industry, the SAFTA committee partnered with the Emmy Awards committee in 2015 to review and advise on improvements to the judging process. As a result, judges only cast a vote within their speciality and not every category during the first phase of judging.

=== Phase one ===
The first round of judging, or filtration phase, is when all entries are considered. It typically takes place over six weeks during October and November the year before the ceremony. The filtration process reduces the number of entries to a minimum of five and maximum of seven finalists per category. If there are three or less entries in a category, the award is suspended for the year. This often applies to technical awards, where as the threshold of entries may be lower for the top award categories like Best TV Drama, Best TV Soap, Best TV Comedy, Best Feature Film, Best Actor Feature Film and Best Actress Feature Film .

The judges are split into "panels", each panel is made up of specialists in the given category. For example, the judges who are television directors will only judge for the television directing categories (regardless of genre). The panels must elect a Panel Chairperson and Deputy Chairperson, who participate in both phases of judging. A score card is created by the newly appointed jury chairperson(s), based on specific criteria in a given category. These criteria typically ranges between three or four questions, with each question receiving a rating out of five. This is an example of what a score card for the television directing might look like:

Question	Rating
The technical direction of the show	3
The direction of performances	2
The directorial interpretation of the script	4
Total score	9

Once all the score cards have been counted, the top seven finalist in each category move onto phase two.

=== Phase two ===
The final phase takes place between November and January with a new set of judges. These judges have no prior knowledge of the first phase and are, again, split into speciality panels. Each panel is encouraged to have at least one meeting, via Skype or in-person, to discuss the finalists in their category. An auditor is present during meetings to assess that discussions are "free and fair", and are not dominated by one point-of-view. After these discussions, the judges submit their score cards to the SAFTA committee. The three productions that receive the highest scores make the nominee list, that is typically announced in early-February. The auditors, assigned by the SAFTA committee, tally the final scores submitted and are the only ones who know the winners before the awards evening.

== Ceremonies ==
The inaugural awards ceremony was held in 2006, there have been 18 editions to date.

Ceremony	Date	Best Feature Film	Best Actress (Feature Film)	Best Actor (Feature Film)	Best TV Drama	Best TV Comedy	Best TV Soap	Best Score (Feature)	Host(s)	Venue
1st SAFTA	28 October 2006	Tsotsi	Quanita Adams	Presley Chweneyagae	Hard Copy	City Ses'la	Isidingo	No Award	David Kau	Gallagher Estate
2nd SAFTA	27 October 2007	Goodbye Bafana	Pauline Malefane	Leon Schuster	When We Were Black	Laugh Out Loud	Generations	No Award	David Kau	Gallagher Estate
3rd SAFTA	7 February 2009	No Award	No Award	No Award	Bay of Plenty	City Ses'la	Isidingo	Confessions of a Gambler	Trevor Noah	State Theatre
4th SAFTA	20 February 2010	Shirley Adams	Denise Newman	Kenneth Nkosi	Sokhulu & Partners	Family Bonds	7de Laan	Phillip Miller	John Vlismas	State Theatre
5th SAFTA	27 February 2011	Life, Above All	Khomotso Manyaka	Themba Ndaba	Erfsondes	Proesstraat	Rhythm City	Restless Natives	Thami Ngubeni; Joey Rasdien	Melrose Arch
6th SAFTA	10 March 2012	Black Butterflies		Deon Lotz	Intersexsions	Gauteng Maboneng	Isidingo	Phillip Miller	Bridget Masinga; Jeannie D	Gallagher Estate
7th SAFTA	17 March 2013	Material	Lindiwe Ndlovo	Riaad Moosa	4Play: Sex Tips for Girls	No Award	7de Laan	Michael Bester	Connie Ferguson; Nik Rabinowitz	Gallagher Estate
8th SAFTA	5 April 2014	Of good report	Antoinette Louw	Mathusi Magano	Intersexsions	ZA News	7de Laan	Bruce Retief	Tumi Morake; Iminam Tatiya	Gallagher Estate
9th SAFTA	22 March 2015	Four Corners	Thishiwe Ziqubu	Jezriel Skei	Swartwater	ZA News	Isibaya	Markus Wormstorm	Loyiso Gola	Gallagher Estate
10th SAFTA	20 March 2016	Dis ek, Anna	Fulu Mughovani	Mduduzi Mabaso	Umlilo	ZA News	Rhythm City	Mpho Nthangeni	Minnie Dlamini; Katlego Maboe	Gallagher Estate
11th SAFTA	16 March 2017	Sink	Shoki Mokgape	Dann-Jacques Mouton	Heist	Puppet Nation ZANews	The Road	Chris Letcher	Thando Thabethe; Katlego Maboe	Sun City
12th SAFTA	25 March 2018	Inxeba	Crystal-Donna Roberts	Nakhane Touré	Tjovitjo	Puppet Nation ZANews	Isibaya & Uzalo	Rashid Lanie	Thando Thabethe; Phat Joe	Sun City
13th SAFTA	2 March 2019	Sew the Winter to My Skin	Jill Levenberg	Jarrid Geduld	Lockdown	Tali's Wedding Diary	The River	Quinn Lubbe	Rorisang Thandekiso; Pearl Modiadie; Thomas Msengane; Somizi somGee Mhlongo	Sun City
14th SAFTA	29 April 2020	Fiela se Kind	Clementine Mosimane	Bongile Mantsai	The Republic	No Award	Rhythm City	Chris Letcher		Virtual Event
15th SAFTA	21 May 2021	Toorbos	Tinarie Van Wyk-Loots	Tshamano Sebe	Blood & Water	The Riviera	Rhythm City	Andries Smit	Dineo Langa; Mpho Popps; Graeme Richards	Virtual Event
16th SAFTA	3 September 2022	I Am All Girls	Hlubi Mboya-Arnold	Jafta Mamabolo	4 Mure	Tali's Baby Diary	Suidooster	Ebenhaezer Smal	Khutso Theledi; Mpho Popps; Ryle De Morny	Virtual Event
17th SAFTA	30 September 2023	Gaia	Noxolo Dlamini	Jarrid Geduld	Lavish	How to Ruin Christmas	Scandal!	Pierre-Henri Wicomb	Zozibini Tunzi; Lawrence Maleka; Carl Wastie	Gallagher Estate
18th SAFTA	26 October 2024	The Fragile King	Antoinette Louw	Vusi Kunene	Shaka iLembe	Yoh! Christmas	Skeem Saam	No Award	Lerato Kganyago; Skhumba Hlophe	Gallagher Estate

== Notable moments ==
=== Generations withdraws its nominations (2008) ===
In 2008, Mfundi Vundla, creator of the popular TV soap Generations, withdrew from the 3rd South African Film and Television Awards by declining all nominations of the show, directors, actors, and actresses. The entry application had been submitted by the SABC, without consulting the head producer, Friedrich Stark, whose name was on the application. It was then signed by an intern, violating the SAFTA entry requirements. Vundla stated that the Generations entries at the 2nd South African Film and Television Awards were "pushed through" by the SABC and accepted by SAFTA after the judging process had already been completed. This brought into question the integrity of the ceremony, Vundla explained that he would not be "coerced" into entering again and that the "awards must first get their house in order". The Generations production team did not attend the ceremony, as Vundla explained he wanted to avoid "creating the impression that Generations in any way supports [the SAFTAs]". The NFVF CEO, Eddie Mbalo, publicly stated his "disappoint" in Vundla's decision to withdraw the nominations and believed the team was being "denied the opportunity to be acknowledged" by the industry.

== Award categories ==
The South African Film & Television Award is awarded in the following categories:

=== Feature Film ===
- Best Feature Film
- Best Actor in a Feature Film
- Best Actress in a Feature Film
- Best Supporting Actor in a Feature Film
- Best Supporting Actress in a Feature Film
- Best Achievement in Directing - Feature Film
- Best Achievement in Scriptwriting - Feature Film
- Best Achievement in Cinematography - Feature Film
- Best Achievement in Original Song - Feature Film
- Best Achievement in Original Music/Score - Feature Film
- Best Animation
- Best Short Film
- Best Student Film
- Best Achievement in Production Design - Feature Film
- Best Achievement in Sound Design - Feature Film
- Best Achievement in Costume Design - Feature Film
- Best Achievement in Make-Up & Hairstyling - Feature Film
- Best Achievement in Editing - Feature Film

=== Documentary ===
- Best Documentary Feature
- Best Documentary Short
- Best Achievement in Directing - Documentary
- Best Achievement in Cinematography - Documentary
- Best Achievement in Sound Design - Documentary
- Best Achievement in Editing - Documentary

=== Television/Soap/Telenovela ===
Programs

- Best TV Drama
- Best TV Comedy
- Best TV Soap
- Best Telenovela
- Best Made for TV Movie
- Best Variety Show
- Best Current Affairs Programme
- Best Structured or Docu-Reality Show
- Best Lifestyle Programme
- Best Educational Programme
- Best Children’s Programme
- Best Entertainment Programme
- Best International Format
- Best Competition Reality Show
- Best Structured Soapie Reality Show
- Best Youth Programme

==== Lead actor ====
- Best Actor in a TV Drama
- Best Actor in a TV Comedy
- Best Actor in a TV Soap
- Best Actor in a Telenovela

==== Lead actress ====
- Best Actress in a TV Drama
- Best Actress in a TV Comedy
- Best Actress in a TV Soap
- Best Actress in a Telenovela

==== Supporting actor ====
- Best Supporting Actor in a TV Drama
- Best Supporting Actor in a TV Comedy
- Best Supporting Actor in a TV Soap
- Best Supporting Actor in a Telenovela

==== Supporting actress ====
- Best Supporting Actress in a TV Drama
- Best Supporting Actress in a TV Comedy
- Best Supporting Actress in a TV Soap
- Best Supporting Actress in a Telenovela

==== Directing ====
- Best Achievement in Directing - TV Drama
- Best Achievement in Directing - TV Comedy
- Best Achievement in Directing - TV Soap
- Best Achievement in Directing - Telenovela

==== Scriptwriting ====
- Best Achievement in Scriptwriting - TV Drama
- Best Achievement in Scriptwriting - TV Comedy
- Best Achievement in Scriptwriting - TV Soap
- Best Achievement in Scriptwriting - Telenovela

==== Original music ====
- Best Achievement in Original Music/Score - TV Drama
- Best Achievement in Original Music/Score - TV Comedy
- Best Achievement in Original Music/Score - TV Soap
- Best Achievement in Original Music/Score - Telenovela
- Best Achievement in Original Song

==== Production design/art direction ====
- Best Achievement in Art Direction - TV Drama
- Best Achievement in Art Direction - TV Comedy
- Best Achievement in Art Direction - TV Soap
- Best Achievement in Art Direction - Telenovela

==== Sound design ====
- Best Achievement in Sound - TV Drama
- Best Achievement in Sound - TV Comedy
- Best Achievement in Sound - TV Soap/Telenovela

==== Costume design/wardrobe ====
- Best Achievement in Wardrobe - TV Drama
- Best Achievement in Wardrobe - TV Comedy
- Best Achievement in Wardrobe - TV Soap/Telenovela

==== Make-up & hairstyling ====
- Best Achievement in Make-Up & Hairstyling - TV Drama
- Best Achievement in Make-Up & Hairstyling - TV Comedy
- Best Achievement in Make-Up & Hairstyling - TV Soap/Telenovela

==== Editing ====
- Best Achievement in Editing - TV Drama
- Best Achievement in Editing - TV Comedy
- Best Achievement in Editing - TV Soap
- Best Achievement in Editing - Telenovela

==== Visual effects ====
- Best Achievement in SFX - Film & TV
- Best Achievement in VFX - Film & TV

The following special awards may be awarded at the discretion of the SAFTA Executive and Judging Committees:

- Lifetime Achiever Award
- Emerging Filmmaker
- Youth Achiever
- Outstanding Person with Disability Contributor Award
- Outstanding Provincial Contributor Award

== See also ==
- List of television awards
- Cinema of South Africa
- Television in South Africa
- List of South African films
- List of South African television series
