= Connie Ferguson =

South African-Motswana actress and film producer (born 1970)

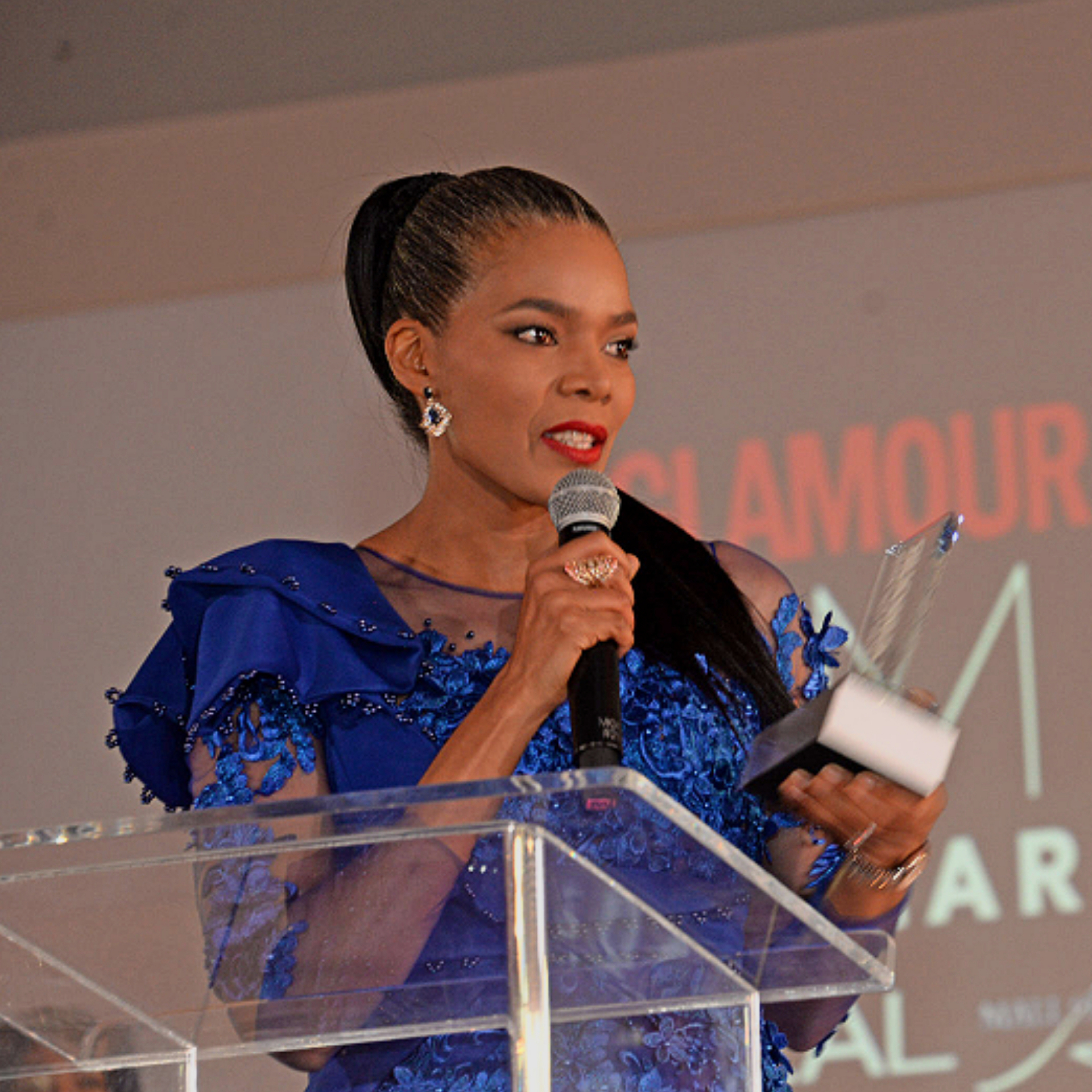
- Connie Ferguson speaking at Glamour Awards in 2018
- Born: Constance Masilo; 10 June 1970 (age 55); Northern Cape, South Africa
- Education: University of KwaZulu Natal
- Occupations: Actress; producer; model; investor; business woman; South African
- Known for: The Queen as Harriet Khoza
- Spouses: Neo Matsunyane (m. 1993; div. 1998) Shona Ferguson (m. 2001; died 2021)
- Children: Lesedi Matsunyane-Ferguson; Felicia Ferguson

Constance Connie Ferguson (née Masilo; born 10 June 1970) is a South African-Motswana actress, filmmaker, producer and businesswoman. She is best known for her lead role as Karabo Moroka on one of South Africa's most popular soap operas, Generations. She starred on the show from its start in 1993 until she exited in 2010. In 2014, she reprised her role on the show after a 4-year absence for a short term. Ferguson was on the cover of Forbes Woman Africa magazine in 2018.

== Career ==
=== Generations (1993–2010; 2014–2016; 2023) ===
In 1993, she began acting in the main role of Karabo Moroka, the wife of Tau Mogale and sister to Archie Moroka, in the most popular South African soap opera, Generations. She starred alongside Menzi Ngubane, Slindile Nodangala and Sophie Ndaba. In 2010, after playing the lead role of Karabo Moroka for 16 years, Connie announced her departure from Generations "to pursue other career options". Ferguson left Generations on a good note as she returned to the soapie four years later, in 2014, to help relaunch Generations: The Legacy. She left the show again in 2016. In 2023, Ferguson returned back to the show, together with Rapulana Seiphemo to reprise their legendary roles as Karabo Moroka and Tau Mogale.

=== The Wild (2010–2013) ===
After her 2010 departure from Generations, she went on to star in the lead role of the M-Net telenovela The Wild, which was shot at an exotic South African game farm. She co-starred with her real-life husband, Shona Ferguson, until its cancellation in April 2013.

=== Ferguson Films (2010–present) ===
Connie and her husband, Shona, launched the television company Ferguson Films in 2010. Their first production, Rockville, was commissioned by M-Net three years later. Other productions include, The Gift, The Throne, The Queen and The Imposter. The couple often appear in their own productions; for example, Connie played the role of Harriet Khoza on The Queen.

The Queen was nominated in several categories at the South African Film and Television Awards in 2018.

She appears in the Netflix series "Kings of Jo'burg" which went into a second series in January 2023. Fellow actors were Cindy Mahlangu, Buhle Samuels, Zolisa Xaluva and Nigerian actor Enyinna Nwigwe.

=== Business Ventures ===
Ferguson launched a fragrance called True Self in 2008, and a lotion in 2014.

== Personal life ==
Ferguson (then Masilo) married fellow actor Neo Matsunyane in 1992. In December 1993, they welcomed a daughter. They divorced in 1998, after five years of marriage.

In July 2001 at Matseliso Secondary, Ferguson met actor Shona Ferguson. In November 2001, three years after her divorce with Matsunyane, they married. In June 2002, the couple welcomed a daughter. After nearly 20 years of marriage, Shona Ferguson died in the afternoon of 30 July 2021 from COVID-19-related complications.

== Filmography ==
Year	Film	Role
(1993 –2010)	Generations	Karabo Moroka
(2000 –2009)	Soul City	Dr. Lerato Molefe
(2004 – 2007)	Late Night News With Connie Ferguson	Herself
(2010)	Comedy Central Roaster	Judge
(2011 – 2013)	The Wild	Marang Lebone
(2013)	Strictly Come Dancing	Herself
(2014)	Generations: The Legacy	Karabo Moroka
(2015 – present)	Rockville	Mavis Mabaso
(2016 – 2023)	The Queen	Harriet Khoza
(2018)	The River	Harriet Khoza
(2021–present)	Kings of Joburg	Josaline "Mermaid" Masire
(2023)	Generations: The Legacy	Karabo Moroka
(2024)	Heart of the Hunter	Molebogeng Kwena

== Achievements ==
=== National Film and Television Awards ===
Year	Nominee / work	Award	Result	Ref.
2024	Herself	Best Actress 2024	Pending	
2024	Herself	Celebrity Personality of the Year 2024	Pending	
