= Generations: The Legacy =

South African soap opera

- Created by: Mfundi Vundla
- Written by: Collin Olliphant; Fezile Cookie; Bryon Abrahams; Zamo Mkhwanazi; Khanyisa Jali Omeiza; Sipho Radebe; Dorothy Nel
- Starring: Kgomotso Christopher; Connie Ferguson; Vusi Kunene; Refilwe Madumo; Samkelo Mabaso; Vuyolwethu Matiwane; Sannah Mchunu; Tinah Mnumzana; Winnie Ntshaba; Nozuko Ntshangase; Manaka Ranaka-Mnisi; Jo-Anne Reyneke; Rapulana Seiphemo; Bheki Sibiya; Philip Tipo Tindisa; Samela Tylerbooi
- Theme music composer: Jonas Gwangwa
- Country of origin: South Africa
- No. of episodes: 3273

Production
- Executive producer: Mfundi Vundla
- Producers: Human Stark; Karen Vundla
- Production company: Morula Pictures

Original release
- Network: SABC 1
- Release: 1 December 2014 – present

Related
- The Estate. & Days Of Our Lives

Generations: The Legacy is a South African soap opera created and produced by Mfundi Vundla. It is a remake of the soap opera Generations, also created and produced by Vundla, but with many new and different characters, different settings and different tones. It is the second most watched television show in South Africa.

== Cast ==
=== Main ===
Alphabetic Order of The Cast
Actor	Role	Lead Actors
Connie Ferguson	Karabo Moroka-Mogale	Main
Winnie Ntshaba	Khethiwe Buthelezi	Main
Jo-Anne Reyneke	Refilwe Nkaba-Mashatile	Main
Manaka Ranaka-Mnisi	Lucy Diale	Main
Vusi Kunene	Jack Mabaso	Main
Rapulana Seiphemo	Tau Mogale	Main
Kgomotso Christopher	Keabetswe Moroka-Moloi	Main
Refilwe Madumo	Fikile Maponya	Main
Bheki Sibiya	G-Wagon	Main
Tinah Mnumzana	Nokwazi Lukhozi	Main
Nozuko Ntshangase	Vuyelwa Nxumalo	Main
Sana Mchunu	Sis Phindi Nxumalo	Main
Philip Tipo Tindisa	Donald Brave	Main
Vuyolwethu Matiwane	Lulama Moroka	Main
Samkelo Mabaso	Sam Ngwenya	Main

=== Former ===
Actor	Role
Ayanda Borotho	Dr.Busisiwe Mlambo-Dzedze
Zizipho Buti	Tracy Jali
Mothusi Chebeletsane	Molefe Moroka
Athwie Cwela	Kamogelo Moroka
Vuyo Dabula	Kumkani "Gaddafi" Phakade
Mnqobi Duma	Bafana "Fana" Cele
Andisiwe Dweba	Gertrude "Getty" Diale
Connie Ferguson	Karabo Moroka-Mogale
Asanda Foji	Simphiwe Ngobese -Moroka
Danica Jones	Tamryn Basson
Kgope Kagae	Moreri Makhafola
Busisiwe Kondleko	Melokuhle Brave-Phakade
Dintle Khonou	Tumelo Gcabashe
Celeste Khumalo	Bulelwa Jafta
Ditebogo Ledwaba	Mbalenhle "Mbali" Makhafola
Mahlatse Letoka	Xolelwa
Joe Mafela	Tebogo Moroka
Letoya Makhene	Matshidiso "Tshidi" Mogale
Mxolisi Masango	Zachariah "Zach" Mahlomuza
Paballo Mavundla	Jerah "Crazy J" Moroka
Thuso Mbedu	Okuhle Cele
Nelisa Mchunu	Tizitha Mngomezulu
JT Medupi	Jonathan Motene
Likhona Mgali	Aseza Malinga
Chiedza Mhende	Wandile "Wandi" Radebe
Brenda Mhlongo	Nandi Mabaso
Kabelo Moalusi	Siya Radebe
Candice Modiselle	Lerato Matema
Thato Mokoena-Mthombeni	Cindy Khumalo
Michelle Molatlou	(untitled guest)
Pearl Monoa	Dr Sphesihle Cele-Moroka
Moopi Mothibeli	Smangaliso "Smanga" Moroka
Muzi Mthabela	Nkosiyabo Cele
Khaya Mthembu	Captain James
Zoe Mthiyane	Zitha Langa
Brandon "Gash1" Mthombeni	Thabo Khumalo
Lebohang Mthunzi	Angela Radebe
Luyanda Mzazi	Lesedi Diale
Andile Nelubane	Dali Malinga
Mutodi Neshehe	Zola Radebe
Musa Ngema	Mazwi Moroka
Sthandile Nkosi	Sonia Makgamedtja
Nicholas Nkuna	Anathi Mpofu
Terrence Ngwila	Kagiso Matlala
Zola Nombona	Pamela Khoza
Six Nyamane	Nozipho Moroka
Buntu Petse	Nontle Mogale
Thulisile Phongolo	Namhla Diale
Lungile Radebe	Themba Makhafola
Kagiso Rathebe	Elam
Kgosimore Rankhomose	Paul Moroka Jnr
Neo Rapotsoa	Didi Mpofu
Jo-Anne Reyneke	Refilwe Nkaba-Mashatile
Kay Sibiya	Siyanda Khoza
Nathaniel Junior Singo	Mpho Phakade
Tabile Tau	Bonga Mpofu
Thando Thabethe	Nolwazi Buzo
Yonda Thomas	Lelethu Malinga
Nkululeko Tshirumbula	Vuyo Radebe
Samela Tylerbooi	Ayanda Majola-Malinga
Busisiwe Xaba	Palesa Matema
Zenzelisiphesihle Sparky Xulu	Sotsaletimanga Ngwenya
Denise Zimba	Mary Gumede
Rosemary Zimu	Violetta Moabi

== Characters ==
- Connie Ferguson as Karabo Moroka: The gracious and vicious eldest daughter of Paul Moroka who was appointed as leader next to her brother Archie Moroka. She is Tau Mogale first and former love interest. She is the widow of Zola Radebe.
- Manaka Ranaka-Mnisi as Lucy Diale : The vicious ruthless sister of Thembinkosi Cosmo Diale who rose from the ashes of poverty to new found success in her hometown. She is the ex-wife of Mrekza Makhafola and an adoptive mother of Mbali. She is the mother of Namhla Mabaso. She is currently a stepmother of Themba Makhafola.
- Rapulana Seiphemo as Tau Mogale: The hardcore successful son of Zondiwe Mogale. He was married to Karabo Moroka but separated when Karabo choose Zola Radebe over him. He is the father of Nontle Mogale and brother of Matshidiso Phakade.
- Aubrey Poolo as Khumo Moroka: The ruthless ambitious cousin of Karabo Moroka who is willing to do anything to be seen as the man on top. His arrival cause havoc in the Moroka family and division at #Ezweni
- Zenzilisiphesihle Xulu as Sotsalitimanga Ngwenya: Described as an arrogant but smart young inspiring man.His arrival cause tension as the rich and powerful question their identity and weak and clueless dangle around his every say. Ngwenya is a man of intelligence and with a strong family name; he sure moves like an innovator ready to build or destroy anything that stands in his way
- Vusi Kunene as Jack Mabaso: Mabaso is the dangerously indestructible gangster who is trying to leave the life of crime behind but is always misjudged. He is the stepfather of Dr Sphesihle Moroka and the birth father of Namhla Diale.
- Ronnie Nyakale as Cosmo Diale: Formal name is Thembinkosi Diale but he is known as Cosmo Diale or "Uncle Cosmo". He is the brother of Lucy Diale who struggled his way to success after he was arrested.
- Samela Tylerbooi as Ayanda Majola: Formally address as Ayanda Malinga, she is the ex-wife of the late Dali Malinga and mother to Nontle Mogale. Her viciousness has challenged her to choose what's right for her even if everyone is against her decision.
- Refilwe Madumo as Fikile Maponya: She is described as the ambitious and bubbly ex-wife of billionaire Ben Mpofu. She is the mother of Bonga and the late Didi Mpofu. She is the CEO of Moroka Maponya Media (MMM) which she co-founded with the late Mazwi Moroka.
- Kgomotso Christopher as Kea Moroka: Born as the youngest Moroka princess alongside her twin brother Khumo, Keabetswe Anastasia Moroka-Moloi (née Moroka) was raised to a world of perfectionist and competition. She doesn't carry out her strength unless pushed to her core. She is the mother of Kamogela Moroka. Like Mazwi; Kea was enforced to an arranged marriage to another prominent family; the Moloi's

== Reception ==
The show has received generally negative reviews from fans and critics alike and aired with low ratings. But the fans would still watch the revamp shortly thereafter. Currently, it is the third most watched soap opera in South Africa.

== In other media ==
A still from a scene depicting Tau Mogale remarking "Am I a joke to you?" is frequently used as a reaction image and Internet meme; it was first circulated on Twitter in 2016.
