= Mzansi Magic =

South Africa satellite channel

- Country: South Africa
- Broadcast area: South Africa, Africa
- Headquarters: Johannesburg

Programming
- Languages: English (and 11 official languages of South Africa)
- Picture format: 576i (SDTV, 16:9) - DStv, 1080i (HDTV, 16:9) - DStv

Ownership
- Owner: MultiChoice (Canal+ S.A.)
- Sister channels: Me; 1max Vuzu; SuperSport; Channel O M-Net; KykNET; Africa Magic; Maisha Magic; Zambezi Magic; Pearl Magic; Wethu+

History
- Launched: 12 July 2010; 16 years ago

Links
- Website: http://mzansimagic.dstv.com/

Availability

Terrestrial
- DStv: Channel 161

Mzansi Magic is a South African digital satellite and general entertainment channel created by Multichoice and run by M-Net's local interest division; it is broadcast on DStv.

== History ==
The channel launched in mid-July 2010 on channel 107 as M-Net's platform to boost local production and showcase entertainment in South Africa. Through the channels development, M-Net would engage with local producers, partnering with South African filmmakers to create gripping content with universal appeal while empowering new and upcoming talent and ensuring that key skills are transferred to the industry.

The channel launched with a six-hour programming block with a mix of original local series and international movies. It was headed by film veteran Lebone Maema. The channel began broadcasting in HD on 24 July 2015.

In August 2026, it was announced that Mzansi Bioskop and Mzansi Music would be shutting down on 16 September 2026 alongside kykNET Lekker and M-Net Movies 1, while Mzansi Wethu would rebrand as Wethu+.

== Programming ==
Mzansi Magic primarily focuses on original local productions and feature films from South Africa, with a few additions of international content.

=== Soapies, Dramas and Telenovelas ===
The channel carries original drama series and telenovelas. Titles include The Queen, Gomora, Isibaya, Umbuso, Shaka Ilembe, Housekeepers, DiepCity, Gqeberha: The Empire and Umkhoka: The Curse. The channel also carries drama series from its sister channels and co-productions from Showmax like Jacob's Cross, The River, Grassroots and Trackers.

=== Reality, Talk and Magazine ===
The channel has a strong focus on highly popular reality series, most notably Date My Family SA, Our Perfect Wedding South Africa, Mnakwethu, Idols South Africa, Big Brother Mzansi, Living The Dream with Somizi and Being Bonang amongst others. It also includes international talk shows like The Talk and The Doctors.

=== Sports ===
The carries some content which is simulcasted with SuperSport. This includes highlights of WWE Raw and SmackDown, as well as the Nedbank Ke Yona Team Search.

=== Music ===
The channel has music specials and interviews with local artists.

=== Movies ===
Initially, the channel carried several international movie titles and gradually worked with new upcoming producers and veterans in the industry. The channel has come to categories these made-for-TV movie titles as 'Lokshin Bioskop' and proved to be popular amongst DStv subscribers.
