= Zola Nombona =

South African actress

- Born: Zola Nombona; 10 March 1992 (age 34); Mthatha, Eastern Cape, South Africa
- Education: Victoria Girls' High School
- Alma mater: University of the Witwatersrand
- Occupations: Actress; dancer
- Years active: 2013–present
- Spouse: Thomas Gumede(married 2018)
- Children: 1

Zola Nombona (born 10 March 1992) is a South African actress best known for her role as Shado, a streetwise teenager, in the second season of the SABC 1 drama series Intersexions in 2013. In 2021 the actress joined Generations: The Legacy playing the character of Pamela Khoza; a vicious journalist and wife of Siyanda Khoza opposite Vusi Kunene, Manaka Ranaka and Abigail Kubheka-Molefe. In 2023 Zola was cast as lead actor in Mzansi Magic new telenovela My Brother's Keeper opposite Wiseman Mncube and Lindani Nkosi.

== Education ==
She went to Victoria Girls' High School, Grahamstown, before achieving a bachelor's and an honours degree in dramatic arts at the University of the Witwatersrand.

== Career ==
Nombona's first major role was on a drama series Intersexions based on HIV/Aids on SABC 1 in 2013.

In 2015, she had her first starring role as Roxanne in the e.tv drama Zbondiwe.

She also starred as Monde on Lockdown, a television drama series set in a fictional high security prison for women. She played the role of Zee in the movie-turned-drama series Inumber Number.

== Filmography ==
=== Television ===
Year	Title	Role	Notes
2015	Ingoma	Constance Dladla	
	Forced love	Kat Minola	
	iNumber Number	Zee	
	iThuba lokugcina	Zodwa Bhengu	
	Z'bondiwe	Roxanne	Lead Role
2018	Lockdown	Monde	
2019	eHostela	Constable Brightness	
2020–2021	Isono	Zoleka	
2021–2022	Generations: The Legacy	Pamela Khoza	
2023–Present	My Brother's Keeper	Fakazile Dosini-Shabalala	Lead Role
