= Pallance Dladla =

South African actor

- Born: Pallance Nkosinathi Dladla; 22 August 1992 (age 34); Johannesburg, Gauteng, South Africa
- Education: Parktown Boys' High School
- Occupation: Actor
- Years active: 2006–present
- Relatives: Siphesihle Vazi(cousin)
- Website: Pallancedladla.com

Pallance Dladla (born 22 August 1992) is a South African actor. He has received multiple awards and nominations, including the SAFTA Award. Dladla first gained recognition as a runner-up on the second season of Class Act. He lost to eventual winners Abdul Khoza and Tumie Ngumla, whom he later would work with in the SABC1 drama series Tempy Pusha.

Dladla has had roles in various television shows, including the drama series 4Play: Sex Tips for Girls, Intersexions, Isibaya, Rhythm City, Is'Thunzi, and the aforementioned drama-comedy Tempy Pushas. His first leading role in a big-budget production came with the drama film Hard to Get (2014). In 2019, Dladla starred in the Netflix thriller series Shadow, as the title character Shadrach "Shadow" Khumalo.

== Early life ==
Dladla was born in the Johannesburg, Gauteng province of South Africa. He was raised in the township of Soweto. Dladla grew up without his father and was raised by his grandfather. According to Dladla his grandfather named him "Pallance" after his favourite actor, Jack Palance. He attended Parktown Boys' High School in Wellington Road near Park town Mansion.

== Career ==
=== 2006–2010: Career beginnings ===
Dladla developed a love for acting at a young age. In 2010, he participated in the Milk and Bread nationwide DALRO scholarship competition, where his self-penned play was a runner-up. While at school, Dladla won the Parktown Boys High Original Script Award along with the Best Actor Award. Dladla went on to win the Most Prestigious Best Actor Award in the ACT/DALRO/Nedbank Scholarships Development.

=== 2011–2012: Class Act and breakthrough ===
In 2011, while accompanying a friend to audition for Class Act, Dladla made an impromptu decision to also audition in the talent search competition broadcast nationally by SABC1. Dladla reached the final stage of Class Act 2011. He received acclaim from the likes of Darryl Roodt, who directed the Academy Award-nominated film Yesterday. Dladla ultimately lost the competition to Abdul Khoza in the final public voting.

In 2012, alongside Xolile Tshabalala, Kgomotso Christopher, Tiffany Jones, and Cheryl Ladd, he played a starring role as Jimmy in the etv drama series 4Play: Sex Tips for Girls - Season 3. That same year, he had a cameo role as "Mohato" in the British drama series Wild at Heart.

=== 2013-2014 ===
In 2013, he played the role of Sizwe on the SABC1 drama series Intersexions. In the same year, he starred as the character of X on SABC 1 comedy-drama Tempy Pushas. In season 3 of the series he was replaced by Luzuko Nteleko. Shortly after, he landed a starring role in the Mzansi Magic soap-opera Isibaya, where he portrayed the character Jabulani "Jabu" Zungu. He was part of the original cast since the show began. Dladla received acclaim for his performance as a supporting actor in the action movie iNumber Number (2013).

In June 2014, Dladla joined the e.tv soapie Rhythm City, taking over the role of Sibusiso Vilakazi, previously played by Lungile Radu. In addition, Dladla was cast in the romantic drama film Hard to Get alongside Thishiwe Ziqubu and Israel Makoe. The film garnered a range of positive user reviews.

=== 2016-2017 ===
From 2016-2017, Dladla had a recurring role as Duke in the Mzansi Magic-Doug Liman directed drama Is'thunzi.

=== Present ===
In 2019, Dladla starred in the Netflix thriller series Shadow as title character Shadrach "Shadow" Khumalo. Fellow cast members include Amanda Du-Pont, Khathu Ramabulana, and Tumie Ngumla. Shadow was Netflix's first South African original series, premiering on 8 March 2019.

== Personal life ==
Dladla enjoys dancing and watching movies in his spare time. His favorite movies include Scarface, Training Day and Mean Streets. Dladla has cited Al Pacino, Denzel Washington, and Johnny Depp as his favorite actors. Dladla is friends with Sdumo Mtshali, with whom he starred in Tempy Pushas, IsiBaya, iNumber Number and Hard to Get.

== Filmography ==
=== Film ===
Year	Title	Role
2013	Avenged	Thulani
2013	iNumber Number	Police Officer
2014	Hard To Get	TK July
2019	Zulu Wedding	Zulu
2023	Alligators	Tristian Nyathi

=== Television ===
Year	Title	Role
2012	4Play: Sex Tips for Girls	Jimmy
2012	Wild at Heart	Mahotela
2013	Intersexion	Sizwe
2013–2015	Tempy Pushas	X
2014–2015	Rhythm City	Sibusiso Vilakazi
2014–2021	Isibaya	Jabulani Zungu
2016–2017	Is'thunzi	Duke
2019	Shadow	Shadow
2021-2023	Dam	Themba
2022	Justice Served	Uhuru
2024	Blood Legacy	Sizwe Blanco
2024	Queendom	Prince Mcebo Khahlamba
TBA	Married To The Present †	In production
