= Pound 4 Pound =

South African drama television series

- Genre: Drama
- Created by: Kagiso Modupe
- Written by: Tiisetso Tlelima
- Directed by: Kagiso Modupe; Sibusiso Phakathi
- Starring: Enhle Mbali Mlotshwa; Mduduzi Mabaso; Kealeboga Masango; Kwanele Mthethwa; Sne Mbatha; Nicole Bessick; Zolisa Xaluva; Don Mlangeni Nawa; Brandon Auret
- Countries of origin: South Africa; America
- Original language: English
- No. of seasons: 1
- No. of episodes: 13

Production
- Executive producers: Kagiso Modupe; Rashaka Muofhe
- Producer: Bakwena Productions
- Camera setup: Multi-camera
- Running time: 22–24 minutes

Original release
- Network: BET Africa
- Release: 29 September – 22 December 2024

Pound 4 Pound is a South African sports drama series created by Kagiso Modupe premiering on BET that centers on the high stakes, often overlooked world of women's boxing in Africa. The story follows Lindiwe Mkhwanazi (played by Enhle Mbali Mlotshwa), a determined COO who defies her all male board to enter an amateur female team into a major Nigerian championship tournament. Actors include Mduduzi Mabaso, Kealeboga Masango, Kwanele Mthethwa, Zolisa Xaluva and Don Mlangeni Nawa.

== Premise ==
Pound 4 Pound centers on Lindiwe Mkhwanazi played by Enhle Mbali Mlotshwa, the passionate COO of the South African Boxing Federation who risks her career to defy an all male board and a stalled system by secretly registering an all women's team for the prestigious Africa Unite Boxing Championship in Lagos, Nigeria. The series follows the team's journey focusing on themes of resilience and female empowerment as an amateur group of underdogs including a former prisoner and a former sex worker trains under the guidance of former boxing champion, Mduduzi Mabaso as Dingaan "Tiger" Nkosi. The show highlights the women fighting for survival and personal traumas to prove they belong in the ring.

== Cast ==
=== Main cast ===
- Enhle Mbali Mlotshwa as Lindiwe
- Mduduzi Mabaso as Dingaan
- Kealeboga Masango as Noks
- Kwanele Mthethwa as Sma
- Sne Mbatha as Kgomotso
- Brandon Auret as Frans
- Gabisile Tshabalala as Sindiswa
- Zolisa Xaluva as Jabulani
- Don Mlangeni Nawa as Jacob

=== Supporting cast ===
- Craig Nobela as Lwandle
- Charlie Bouguenon as Dimitri
- Kea Leburu as Thandiwe
- Elliot Makhubo as Bra Steve
- Didintle Khunou as Portia Tladi
- Craig Palm as Leon
- Lebo Pelesane as Benjamin
- Chumani Pan as Digital Ninja
- Monnye Kunupi as Dorothy
- Vuyo Dabula as Detective Baloyi
- Mapula Mafole as Fatima

== Production ==
Pound 4 Pound is a South African boxing drama series produced by Bakwena Productions in partnership with BET Africa, featuring executive producers Kagiso Modupe who is also the creator and director, and Rashaka Muofhe, along with Herbert Hadebe representing BET with 13 episodes. The series stars Enhle Mbali Mlotshwa as Lindiwe Mkhwanazi, a boxing federation COO navigating organizational sabotage to empower women boxers. The main cast includes Mduduzi Mabaso as trainer Dingaan "Tiger" Nkosi, alongside Kealeboga Masango, Kwanele Mthethwa, Gabisile Tshabalala, Nicole Bessick, Sne Mbatha, Zolisa Xaluva, and Brandon Auret. The story follows the diverse team on their journey to the Africa Unite Boxing Championship in Lagos.

== Release ==
The series premiered on 29 September 2024 to 22 December 2024 on BET Africa, airing weekly on Sundays. It later premiered in the United States on 26 February 2025 at 10 p.m. ET on BET.
