= Mampho Brescia =

South African actress, television presenter and voice over artist (born 1977)

- Brescia in 2020
- Born: Mampho Palesa Molete; 8 December 1977 (age 48); Soweto, Gauteng, South Africa
- Education: University of Witwatersrand; Soka University
- Occupations: actress; television presenter; voice over artist; South African
- Years active: 1998–present
- Known for: Isibaya as Iris Zungu
- Spouse: Nicola Brescia (m. 2005)
- Children: 1

Mampho Palesa Brescia (Sotho pronunciation: [ˈmɑːmpʰɒ pɑlesɑ]; Italian: [ˈbreʃʃa]) (born December 8, 1977) is a South African actress, television presenter and voice-over artist. Popularly known for acting in the television drama series Jacob's Cross and Isibaya.

Her performance as Iris Zungu in Isibaya earned her two nominations for outstanding female villain and outstanding supporting actress at the Royalty Soapie Awards in 2015. In 2021, she was nominated for an international award at the Africa Choice Awards for the category of Next Rated actress of the year.

== Early life ==
Mampho Palesa Brescia (née Molete) was born on December 8, 1977, in the Soweto township of Johannesburg, South Africa to Thomas Segonetso Molete and Augustine Ntsope Molete (née Kolobe). Her interest in films started when she was a child, during her father's tradition of watching historical films every Sunday. She joined school plays from the age of seven and performed in theatre until she finished university.

She completed a degree in International Relations and political science at University of Witwatersrand in South Africa, and an honours degree in Japanese Studies at Soka University in Japan. She worked as a correspondence journalist for the Japanese newspaper Mainichi. Her understanding of Japanese culture and fluency in the language contributed to her appointment as South Africa's first brand ambassador for Japan in 2018.

== Personal life ==
Brescia married Nicola Brescia in 2005. They have a daughter, Rainn Madison Nthatuwa Brescia, born in 2013.

== Filmography ==
=== Television Presenter ===
Year	Title	Role
1998	Reality Check	Co-Host
2003	AfriSat	News Presenter
2004	Imali Mania	Host
2005	Home Channel - Decor Lifestyle	Host

=== Film ===
Year	Title	Role	Notes	Country
2006	Das Traumhotel – Afrika (The Traum Hotel) (Episode 7)	Uncredited		South Africa
2008	Swop	Tina		South Africa
2009	District 9	Reporter		South Africa
2010	What To Bring To America	Helen	Main role	United States of America
2010	Asymmetry	Counselor		United States of America
2015	The Jakes Are Missing	Janice Jakes	Main role	South Africa
2021	I Am All Girls	Brother Boss Girl		South Africa
2022	Eraser: Reborn	U.S. Marshall Keisha Rhodes		United States of America
2022	No Love Lost	Mother of Amahle		South Africa

=== Television Series ===
Year	Title	Role	Notes
2002	Generations (South African TV series)	Mbali	Season 1
2006	Zero Tolerance	Ayanda Magoba	Season 3
2006	Isidingo	Batsi	Season 1
2007–2008	Jacob's Cross	Zanele	Lead in Season 1–3
2009	Home Affairs (TV series)	Mrs Mthiyane	Season 4
2011	Make Love Not War	Lawyer	
2014–2016	Isibaya	Iris Zungu	Lead in Season 1–8
2016	Mfolozi Street	Sibongile Pelompe	Lead in Season 2
2019	Shadow (TV series)	Faith	Lead in Season 1
2021	Dead Places	Jessica	
2021	Family Secrets	Cleopatra Mokwena	Season 2
2022	Savage Beauty (TV series)	Angela Makwetu	Season 1
2022	Lioness	Neurosurgeon	Season 2
2023	In Your Dreams	Mrs Gwaya	Season 1
2024–2025	Soft Life (TV Series)	Zam	Lead in Season 1

== Accolades ==
=== Awards and nominations ===
Name of the award ceremony, year presented, category, nominee of the award, and the result of the nomination
Year	Award Ceremony	Category	Work/Nominee	Result	Ref. Ref.
2015	Royalty Soapie Awards	Outstanding Female Villain	Iris Zungu in Isibaya	Nominated	
2015	Royalty Soapie Awards	Outstanding Supporting Actress	Iris Zungu in Isibaya	Nominated	
2021	Africa Choice Awards	Next Rated Actress of the Year	Iris Zungu in Isibaya	Nominated	
