= Luyanda =

- Gender: feminine or masculine
- Language: Zulu

Origin
- Meaning: It is growing
- Region of origin: Africa

Luyanda is a Zulu given name meaning "it is growing". Notable people with the name include:

- Luyanda Ntshangase (1997–2018) South African footballer
- Luyanda Zuma (born 2001), South African actress and beauty pageant, Miss Charm South Africa 2023
- Luyanda Zwane (born 2004) South African actress and influencer
