= Matshepo Maleme =

South African actress and model

- Born: Matshepo Maleme; 23 August 1980 (age 45); Free State, South Africa
- Occupation(s): Actress, Model
- Years active: 1997–present
- Children: 2

Matshepo Kukie Maleme (born 23 August 1980) is a South African actress and model. She is best known for the role "Busi" in the film A Million Colours (2011), and television soapies such as, Muvhango, Inkaba and House of Zwide.

== Personal life ==
She grew up with her grandparents, but later moved to Johannesburg with her parents.

She is married and is the mother of one boy and one girl.

At the age of 17, she was diagnosed with depression and experienced gender-based violence. She was also abused at the hands of a partner more than once.

== Career ==
In 2004, she made her debut television appearance with the SABC1 drama series, Bubomi Sana and played the role "Zandiswa". Then in May 2007, she joined with the M-Net soap opera Egoli: Place of Gold with the role of "Thuli". In 2010, she made her film debut with the film Night Drive. In 2011, she acted in the film A Million Colours directed by Peter Bishai. The film received critics acclaim and screened in many film festivals. In 2013, she won the Best Supporting Actress Award in Feature Film category at the South African Film and Television Awards (SAFTA). Then at the 2013 Nigeria Entertainment Awards, she was nominated for the Best Pan African Actress.

After that success, she joined with the SABC 2 soap opera Muvhango with the role "Mapule" from 2012 to 2013. Then in the Mzansi Magic telenovela Inkaba, she played the role of "Thuli Malinga". In 2016, she acted in the serial Gold diggers with the role "Cat", which was her first villainous character on television. In 2017, she played the role "Zandile Maphosa" on the soapie Skeem Saam. In 2018, she acted in the mini series Emoyeni by playing the role "Thoko". In another miniseries called After Nine, she played the role of "Bokang" aired on SABC 1.

Apart from that, she made minor sporadic appearances on the soapies such as, Isithembiso, Isibaya, Scandal, Side dish, Imposter and Housekeepers. In 2021, she joined with the e.tv television serial House of Zwide with the role "Rea Molapo". In the serial Scandal, she played the role "Sheila".

== Filmography ==
Year	Film	Role	Genre	Ref.
1997	Muvhango	Mapule Tshidiso	TV series	
2005	Scandal!	Sheila	TV series	
2006	After 9	Bokang Maema	TV mini series	
2007	After 9	Bokang Maema Xaba	TV series	
2010	Night Drive	Tumi	Film	
2011	A Million Colours	Busi	Film	
2012	iNkaba	Thuli Malinga	TV series	
2016	Isibaya	Miriam Ramatlhodi	TV series	
2016	Gold Diggers	Cat	TV series	
2017	Imposter	Linda	TV series	
2017	Skeem Saam6	Zandi Maphosa	TV series	
2018	Emoyeni	Thoko	TV mini series	
2018	Side Dish		TV mini series	
2018	Housekeepers	Eunice	TV series	
2018	Isithembiso 2	Benjemina	TV series	
2021	House of Zwide	Rea Molapo	TV series	
