= Mbalenhle =

- Gender: Female
- Language: Nguni languages

Origin
- Meaning: Beautiful flower

Other names
- Short form: Mbali
- Nickname: Mbali/ Enhle

Mbalenhle is a feminine given name, derived from the Nguni word mbali, meaning "flower." Notable people with the name include:

- Mbali Khumalo, South African beauty queen, Miss Soweto 2024
- Mbalenhle Mavimbela, South African actress
- Enhle Mbali Mlotshwa (born 1988), South African actress

== See also ==
- eMbalenhle Mpumalanga, South Africa, a township
