= Jeffery Sekele =

South African actor

- Born: Jeffery Sekele; 20 August 1973 (age 53); Limpopo, South Africa
- Education: Mahlontebe Secondary School
- Alma mater: Technikon Pretoria
- Occupations: Actor, Voice over artist
- Years active: 1993–present

Jeffery Sekele (born 20 August 1973) is a South African actor and voice over artist. He is best known for the roles in the television serial and soapies such as Behind the Badge, Zero Tolerance, Isibaya, Isidingo, The Lab, 90 Plein Street, Task Force and House of Zwide.

== Personal life ==
Sekele was born on 20 August 1973 in Leeufontein, near Marble Hall in Limpopo, South Africa. He attended to Mahlontebe Secondary School for education. Then he completed higher studied from Technikon Pretoria.

== Career ==
In 1997, he made a minor role as "Advocate Mosomi" in the television serial Muvhango. In 1999, he graduated from Technikon Pretoria and started professional acting career. After that, he appeared in many supportive roles in the serials such as; Soul Buddyz, Zero Tolerance and Gaz'lam. In 2006, he made his film debut with Heartlines with a minor role "Ditch Foreman". In that year, he joined with the cast of Canadian-South African television drama series Jozi-H and played the role of "Solomon".

In 2008, he acted in the Crime mafia film Gangster's Paradise: Jerusalema. In the same year, he appeared in the serial The Lab. Then in 2010, he made notable appearance in many international television serials such as; M-Net serial Jacob's Cross as well as in British-American action adventure spy serial Strike Back. After that success, he acted in the thriller film 48 as "Fistaz Mphahlele". In 2013, he joined with the cast of Mzansi Magic telenovela-turned-soap-opera Isibaya by starring role as "Blade", Bhekifa's right hand man. In 2021, he started to act in the eTv channel 191 television drama series House of Zwide with the role "Isaac Molapo".

Apart from acting, he also worked as an extensive corporate theatre resume, such as Thobela FM, KPMG, Fedsure, Sasol, Woolworths, SABC Sport, Vodacom and ABSA.

== Filmography ==
| Year | Film | Role | Genre | Ref. |
|---|---|---|---|---|
| 1997 | Muvhango | Advocate Mosomi | TV series | |
| 2002 | Soul Buddyz | Mr Mofokeng | TV series | |
| 2004 | Zero Tolerance | Police Detective | TV series | |
| 2005 | Gaz'lam | Police Officer | TV series | |
| 2006 | Heartlines | Ditch Foreman | Film | |
| 2006 | Jozi-H | Solomon | TV series | |
| 2008 | Gangster's Paradise: Jerusalema | Nazareth | Film | |
| 2008 | The Lab | Jimmy Fuyana | TV series | |
| 2010 | 90 Plein Street | Paul Mmarabele | TV series | |
| 2010 | Jacob's Cross | King | TV series | |
| 2011 | Strike Back | Kingston | TV series | |
| 2011 | 48 | Fistaz | Film | |
| 2013 | Isibaya | Blade | TV series | |
| 2013 | End Game | HR Manager | TV series | |
| 2014 | Task Force | Sly Shabalala | TV series | |
| 2021 | House of Zwide | Isaac Molapo | TV series | |
