= Nelisa Mchunu =

South African actress

- Occupations: Actress, Model, MC, Motivational speaker, Writer
- Years active: 2016–present
- Known for: Portrayal of Fikile Hlatshwayo on Uzalo
- Relatives: Londeka Mchunu(sister)

Nelisa Mchunu is a South African actress, model, MC, motivational speaker and writer. She is best known for the roles in the television soap operas such as, Isithembiso, Isibaya and Uzalo as fikile.

== Personal life ==
At the age of 12 years old, She lived with her mother. Her mother was a teacher. When Mchunu was 14 years old, she went to live with her grandmother. She later grew up in Clermont, KwaZulu-Natal, South Africa, when she moved with mother at the age of 6. Her mother is a teacher. When she was in Grade 8, Nelisa and her two brothers moved to Inanda, KwaZulu-Natal to stay with her grandmother.

In the high school, she studied dramatic arts. She was enrolled with the University of Witwatersrand to study BA in Media Studies, but did not complete the course due to financial difficulties. After that, she worked as a waitress and an assistant for a PR company before entering drama.

== Career ==
In 2015, she joined as an extra on SABC 3 television soap opera Isidingo. Then in 2016, she was invited to play the role "Fikile" in the soap opera Uzalo. Her role became highly popular, where she continued to play the role for six years until 25 May 2021. Her role was going to be killed according to the plot, but Nelisa begged not to kill the role. However, the producers finally retired the role, when it could not continue with the storyline.

After the exit, she appeared on SABC 1 soap opera Generations: The Legacy by playing the role of a disgruntled client of #Ezweni. In late 2021, she returned to the soapie Uzalo.

== Filmography ==
Year	Film	Role	Genre	Ref.
2015	Isidingo	Neza	TV series	
2016-2021;2025–Present	Uzalo	Fikile Hlatshwayo	TV soap	
2023-2025	My Brother's Keeper	Khathazile Shabalala	Telenovela	
2020 - 2022	Generations: The Legacy	Tizitha Mngomezulu	TV soap	
2022-2023	Isifiso	Bazothini	TV series	
