= Isiphetho - Destiny =

- Genre: Drama; Telenovela
- Created by: Mandla N; Mpumelelo Nhlapho
- Written by: Mpumelelo Nhlapo; Mandla N; Sasa Nqabeni; Zolisa Sigwada; Nokuphiwa Magubane; Seabela Maila; Msizi Zane Ndovela; Rami Nhlapho; Elelwani Netshifhire; Nombulelo Mcwerah; Pfarelo Nemakonde; Thulani Sandile Sundu; Awelani Makhuvha; Sibusiso Malaza; Shonisani Masutha; Palesa Mashao; Mamello Ngoepe
- Starring: Mbalenhle Mavimbela; Tsholofelo Maseko; Kope Mogae; Upile uThixo Bongco; Gugu Gumede; Linda Sokhulu; Peter Mashego; Mjosti Mbhele; Themba Ndaba; Sindi Dlathu; Thulani Mtsweni; Nokwazi Dlamini
- Country of origin: South Africa
- Original languages: English; IsiZulu; IsiXhosa; SePedi
- No. of seasons: 1
- No. of episodes: 260

Production
- Executive producers: Mandla N; Mpumelelo Nhlapho; Anneliese van Rooyen
- Producer: Zikona Anam Debese
- Production locations: Media City, Johannesburg, South Africa
- Camera setup: Multi-camera
- Running time: 22-24 minutes
- Production company: BlackBrain Pictures

Original release
- Network: e.tv
- Release: 8 April 2024 – 18 April 2025

Isiphetho - Destiny is a South African television drama series created by Mandla N and Mpumelelo Nhlapho. It is an e.tv original series produced by BlackBrain Pictures, and stars Mbalenhle Mavimbela, Upile uThixo Bongco, Tsholo Maseko, Kope Makgae, Gugu Gumede, Linda Sokhulu, Mjosty Mbhele, Thulani Mtsweni, Peter Mashigo, Nokwazi Dlamini, Chrispen Nyathi, Simangele Mhlongo and Sibusiso Sithole.

== Plot ==
Set in the fictional community of Mzimhlophe, the series follows four friends; Buhle (Mbalenhle Mavimbela), Mosa (Kope Magae), Portia (Tsholofelo Maseko) and Ntando (Upile uThixo Bongco). The four are connected by the tragic burning of a family restaurant which claimed the lives of Buhle's grandfather (who owned the restaurant), and a fifth friend.

Now in their thirties, the four reunite in the community, each with their own set of turmoil, haunted by their past. They decide to revive the restaurant that they had burnt down, in hopes of revitalizing the community and rewriting their destiny. With this journey comes past enemies, rivals and family, either ready to stand in their way or take over the business for themselves.

== Cast ==
- Mbalenhle Mavimbela as Buhle, a young woman who searches for independence and strives to leave Mzimhlophe. She finds herself falling in love with where she is, doing what she truly loves.
- Tsholofelo Maseko as Portia. Treated as the black sheep, Portia struggles to discover who she truly is, to be a responsible adult and mother, and prove to the family she is not a failure.
- Kope Mogae as Mosa, a chef who has a deep crush on Portia. While quick-witted, he often changes to fit in a situation, and hides a past that eventually returns to haunt him.
- Upile uThixo Bongco as Ntando. Raised in Mzimhlophe, Ntando moved to the rural Eastern Cape after the events of the fire. She returns to Mzimhlophe after her late husband's family blames her for his death.
- Gugu Gumede as Connie Zondo, a successful but stern businesswoman who runs a successful shisanyama joint. Her villainous side shows when she hears that Buhle has decided to reopen the restaurant, directly competing with her.
- Linda Sokhulu as Blondie Zondo, a former international theatre star who has now settled down. She hides a secret that is eventually revealed.
- Peter Mashego as Justice, husband to Blondie, and responsible for keeping the law in Mzimhlophe working at the police station.
- Mjosti Mbhele as Zwelakhe Zondo, Blondie's twin brother and Buhle's father, who disapproves of Buhle's decision of reopening the restaurant. His journey to success as a businessman is rather questionable.
- Thulani Mtsweni as Mkhapheni, a well known fixer of Mzimhlophe, making a living on electronic repairs. Mkhapheni often serves as the comic relief of the series.
- Nokwazi Dlamini as Sli, Mkhapheni's wife, who is happy in the life she lives with her husband and beloved son, despite being a nuisance occasionally.
- Sibusiso Sithole as Nkosana, Buhle's love interest
- Nokuthula Mazibuko as Kholekile, Nkosana's mother
- Noxolo Shabalala as Vivian
- Banele Zulu as Jabu, Mkhapheni and Sli's son
- Jabulani Masilela as Nduna, leader in a hostel
- Lindani Mhlongo as Dlangamandla,
- Sphiwe Sithole as Sihle, Portia's daughter
- Shibu Molomo as Nkele, sister-in-law to Blondie
- Rebecca Moshoeu as Koko Mashadi, mother-in-law to Blondie.

== Production ==
=== Development ===
The series comes after the cancellation of the telenovela Nikiwe. Initially, e.tv planned to replace the series with the dramedy telenovela uBettina Wethu, which was acquired by e.tv for a fourth season from SABC 1 and Viu. However, after backlash from viewers, with a drop in figures, e.tv quickly shelved the series to sister channel eSeries, while the main channel aired reruns of eKasi: Our Stories. On 4 March 2024 at 21:28, a "special announcement" from e.tv aired on the channel, announcing Isiphetho as the new telenovela.

=== Filming ===
Filming took place at Media City, the former Urban Brew Studios in Randburg, acquired by Mandla N. According to news reports and an interview with Mandla N on Radio 2000, Mandla had just received the title deed to the studio, and the set for the series was built from scratch.

=== Casting ===
Auditions were held nationwide for the series by Black Brain Pictures, starting in KwaZulu-Natal, at the Grace Community Church in Newcastle, on Saturday 13 January, and the Bat Centre in Durban on 14 January, followed by the Eastern Cape, on the 20th of January at The Athenaeum in Gqeberha. Auditions for the 27th and the 28th took place in Limpopo at the Matora Office Complex in Seshego and the Newtown Music Factory in Johannesburg, Gauteng, respectively. The cast was officially announced in March 2024, with Linda Sokhulu, Mjosti Mbhele, Mbalenhle Mavimbela and Gugu Gumede having lead roles.

A 13-episode miniseries, titled Reimagine Your Destiny, premiered alongside the series, chronicling the audition process. Mandla N spearheaded the auditions, with other actors and stars from his current productions.

In August 2024, the series added Themba Ndaba and Sindi Dlathu to the starring cast.

=== Music ===
The original music score is produced by BlackBrain Pictures and Mandla N, with composers and artists Jamela J Ross, Bongo Riot, Senzo Afrika, Henwood and Kurt Slabbert. Shibu Molomo performed the theme song for the title sequence.

== Broadcast ==
Before its television debut, the series was launched with an intimate crowd, including cast and crew members, on Sunday at the Cradle of Humankind World Heritage Site in Muldersdrift, Gauteng.

Initially, the series was set to premiere on the 15th of April 2024 on e.tv. The premiere date was then changed to 8 April 2024. The series was added to streaming service eVOD on the 6th of May.The series was not renewed for another season making it end on its last episode of the season 1.

== Reception ==
e.tv, in a press release, stated that the series drew in 3.3 million viewers in its first episode.
