= Lwazi =

Lwazi is a given name and surname. Notable people with the name include:

- Lwazi Madi (born 1994), South African water polo player
- Lwazi Maziya (born 1983), Swazi footballer
- Lwazi Mthembu (born 1991), South African actress
- Lwazi Mvovo (born 1986), South African rugby union player
- Lwazi Skosana (born 1991), South African footballer
- Takondwa Lwazi (born 1992), Malawian netball player
