= Kwa Baba =

South African drama television series

- Genre: Telenovela
- Created by: Kagiso Mogale
- Written by: Kagiso Mogale
- Directed by: Shirley Adonisi
- Starring: Vuyo Biyela; Rorisang Mohapi; Lindani Nkosi; Kwanele Mthethwa; Mpho J Molepo; Hlengiwe Lushaba; Sparky Xulu; Helen Lebepe; Nkanyiso Mzimela; Phumzile Mlangeni
- Country of origin: South Africa
- Original languages: English; Zulu; Pedi
- No. of seasons: 1

Production
- Executive producers: Kagiso Mogale; Sinini Nyathi-Mati
- Producer: Singa Vision Productions
- Camera setup: Multi-camera
- Running time: 22–24 minutes

Original release
- Network: Mzansi Magic
- Release: 1 June 2026 – present

Kwa Baba is a South African telenovela created by Kagiso Mogale and produced by Singa Vision Productions. It premiered on Mzansi Magic on DStv on 1 June 2026 at 19:30. The series explores themes of identity, traditional burdens and the clash between modern romance.

== Premise ==
The series follows Zwelakhe Mkhize, an ambitious young entrepreneur building a business empire. His life changes when he falls in love with Bahumi Motaung, but their relationship faces obstacles when Zwelakhe discovers an unresolved traditional debt left by his late father.

== Cast ==
=== Main cast ===
- Vuyo Biyela as Zwelakhe Mkhize
- Rorisang Mohapi-Grootboom as Bahumi Motaung
- Kwanele Mthethwa as Khethiwe Mkhize
- Lindani Nkosi as Dumisani Mkhize
- Mpho J Molepo as Solomon Motaung
- Hlengiwe Lushaba as Slindile Mkhize
- Sparky Xulu as Mhlaba Mkhize
- Helen Lebepe as Dikeledi Motaung
- Nkanyiso Mzimela as Musa Mkhize
- Phumzile Mlangeni as Zandile Mkhize

=== Supporting cast ===
- Khanyisani Kheswa as Nhlanhla Mkhize
- Nhlanhla Kunene as Mxolisi Khumalo
- Lungelo Madondo as Nelisiwe Mkhize
- Naledi Mfoloe as Dinana Motaung
- Mosa Lekwene as Tsholofelo Motaung
- Mpilo Khumalo as Mandla Hlatshwayo
- Zinzi Nsele as Nomvula Radebe
- Simo Magwaza as Vusumuzi Radebe
- Makhosazana Ndlovu as Senzeni Mkhize

== Production ==
Kwa Baba is a South African telenovela produced by Singa Vision Productions that premiered on Mzansi Magic on DStv channel 161 on 1 June 2026. The series is set in the vibrant neighborhood of Msawawa, Diepkloof Extension. The series stars Vuyo Biyela as Zwelakhe Mkhize, alongside Rorisang Mohapi as his love interest, Bahumi Motaung. The cast also features Hlengiwe Lushaba, Lindani Nkosi, Kwanele Mthethwa and Mpho J Molepo.

== Release ==
The series premiered on Mzansi Magic on 1 June 2026, airing Mondays to Fridays at 19:30.
