= My Brother's Keeper (South African TV series) =

South African drama television series

- Genre: Telenovela
- Created by: Duma Ndlovu
- Written by: Nontuthuzelo Magoxo
- Directed by: Uvelile Bangani
- Starring: Zola Nombona; Wiseman Mncube; Lindani Nkosi; S'dumo Mtshali; Nkanyiso Mchunu; Sparky Xulu; Hlengiwe Lushaba; Nelisa Mchunu; Rosemary Zimu
- Country of origin: South Africa
- Original languages: English; Tswana; Zulu; Pedi; Xhosa
- No. of seasons: 2
- No. of episodes: 400

Production
- Executive producer: Duma Ndlovu
- Producer: Rhythm World Productions
- Camera setup: Multi-camera
- Running time: 22–24 minutes

Original release
- Network: Mzansi Magic
- Release: 23 October 2023 – 18 April 2025

My Brother's Keeper is a Mzansi Magic telenovela focusing on a deadly succession battle within the wealthy Shabalala family. It centers on Nqubeko played by (Wiseman Mncube), an ambitious son who breaks tradition and challenges his half brothers for control of the family empire, ShabaSnacks by pursuing his brother’s widow, Fakazile played by (Zola Nombona).

== Premise ==
My Brother's Keeper on Mzansi Magic is a dramatic telenovela centered on the intense and succession battles within the wealthy Shabalala family. The story follows Nqubeko, the headstrong and ambitious son of a mistress who tired of being sidelined and manipulates the rules of ukungena (a customary practice where a man marries his late brother's widow) by going after his brother's widow, Fakazile. As the woman holding the key to the family's empire, Fakazile becomes the center of a corrupting battle for power, loyalty and wealth that threatens to destroy the family from within.

== Cast ==
=== Main cast ===
- Zola Nombona as Fakazile
- Wiseman Mncube as Nqubeko
- Lindani Nkosi as Mshengu
- S'dumo Mtshali as Donga
- Nkanyiso Mchunu as Ndumiso
- Sparky Xulu as Thuthuka
- Hlengiwe Lushaba as Mamchunu
- Nelisa Mchunu as Khathazile
- Rosemary Zimu as Puseletso
- Vuyiseka Cawe as Nomsa
- Mnqobi Kunene as Kwezi
- Raphael Griffiths as Sibusiso
- Ntando Mazibuko as Thoba
- Zimkitha Kumbaca as Nomshado
- Nthabiseng Kgosana as Koketso

=== Supporting cast ===
- Zesuliwe Hadebe as Nomalanga
- Lerato Mahlanya as Mam Sarah
- Sebasa Mogale as Bab Mish
- Yolo Noruwana as Makazi
- Amanda Quwe as Doreen
- Dineo Rasidille as Tshidi
- Moopi Mothibeli as Moeketsi Moeti
- Abdul Khoza as Zembe
- Zola Mhlongo as Nkosazana

== Production ==
My Brother's Keeper is a high stakes South African telenovela produced by Rhythm World Productions, the same team behind the hit show Umkhokha. The show is produced by an executive producer Duma Ndlovu, with a narrative focusing on a deadly succession battle within the Shabalala family, specifically exploring the traditional custom of ukungena. The drama follows Fakazile played by Zola Nombona and Nqubeko played by Wiseman Mncube, Mshengu played Lindani Nkosi, and other cast members include S'dumo Mtshali, Vuyiseka Cawe, Nkanyiso Mchunu, Sparky Xulu, Hlengiwe Lushaba, Nelisa Mchunu and Rosemary Zimu.

== Release ==
The series premiered on Mzansi Magic from 23 October 2023 to 19 April 2025, airing Monday to Friday at 19:30.
