= Sive Mabuya =

South African actress (born 1993)

Sivenathi Mabuya
- Born: Sivenathi Mabuya; April 23, 1993 (age 32)
- Other names: Sivenathi Bukani; Sive Mabuya Bukani
- Citizenship: South Africa
- Occupation: actor
- Years active: 2012-Present
- Spouse: Aphiwe Bukani Present (m. 2023)

Sivenathi Mabuya-Bukani ( née Mabuya; born 26 April 1993) is a South African actress. She is best known for her roles as Mkabi in the Showmax historical drama Shaka iLembe, Zoleka in the Netflix series How to Ruin Love : The Proposal and Xolile in the e.tv soap opera Scandal!.

== Early life and education ==
Mabuya was born in Cape Town, and raised in East London, South Africa, alongside three siblings. She participated in her school's drama club and appeared in church productions during her youth. She completed her secondary education with honours in stage and acting, and later earned a Bachelor of Fine Arts (BFA) degree in Theatre. In 2013, she relocated to Johannesburg to pursue a professional acting career.

== Career ==
In 2015, Mabuya won the MAQ Movie acting competition, which was judged by South African actors, Shona Ferguson, Sdumo Mtshali Nomzamo Mbatha and director Darell Roodt.Her win led to a role in Roodt's film Skorokoro, followed by an appearance in Ferguson's television Series Igazi.

In December 2015, she starred in the M-Net film The Ring, alongside Kenneth Nkosi, Ntando Mcube and Cedric Fourie. She subsequently appeared in the feature film The lucky Specials (2016), oppositeThomas Gumede.

Mabuya's other television appearances include Sober Companion (SABC3), Smoke & Mirrors, Easy Money, Housewives (alongside Renate Stuurman and Loyiso MacDonald) and Cobrizi.

== Filmography ==
Year	Title	Role	Notes
2016 - 2017	Igazi	Norooi	-
2016	Sober Companion	Faith	2 episodes
2016	High Rollers	Angela-Jane ''AJ'' Elison	129 Episodes
2017	The Lucky Specials	Nkanyiso	-
2017	Scandal!	Xolile	1 episode
2020	Kedibone	Niki	
2021	Housewives	-	-
2022	A Royal Surprise	Nandi	-
2024	How To Ruin Love	Zoleka	-
2024	Why the Cattle Wait	Sihle	-
2025	Cobrizi	Bongiwe	13 episodes
2025	The Letter	Masello Musa	-
2025	The Chip	Thandi	-
2023 - 2025	Shaka iLembe	Mkabi	5 Episodes

== Awards and nominations ==
- 2018:Nominated - Best Actress in a Supporting Role , Africa Movie Academy Awards
- 2025:Nominated - Next Rated Female Movie Star of the Year, Africa Choice Awards (Nigeria)

== Personal life ==
Mabuya married Aphiwe Bukani on 1 May 2022. The couple welcomed their first child in September 2025.
