= Celeste Ntuli =

South African actress and comedian

Celeste Nonhlanhla Ntuli
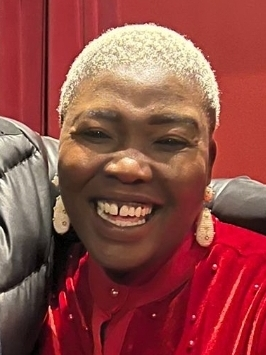
- Born: 25 August 1979 (age 47); Empangeni, KwaZulu-Natal, South Africa
- Education: DUT
- Occupations: actress; comedian
- Known for: Isibaya

Celeste Ntuli (born 25 August 1979) is a South African comedian and actress. She is popularly referred to as the queen of the Zulu comedy and she is known for being the first local female comic to record a one woman show DVD.

== Early years and education ==
Ntuli was born in Empangeni where she had her primary and high school education. She is the sixth child of eight. Her family relocated to Durban, and there she studied entertainment technology at Durban University of Technology.

== Career ==
In 2005, she performed her first comedy show in a church in Durban. She was a finalist on season 2 of SABC 1's So You Think You're Funny competition in 2009. She began her professional career in comedy in 2010. Currently, she is known for being the first comedian to record a one-woman show DVD entitled Seriously, Celeste. She has performed in top Comedy Shows including Blacks Only comedy showcase 2010 and 2012, SA Comic's Choice Awards 2012 and the first Stand Up Zulu comedy show at the Durban Playhouse, in 2011.

In February 2022, Celeste took her career international with a sold out show organized by Akinlolu Jekins at the Leicester Square Theatre in London, UK.

== Filmography ==
She has starred in several movies and shows including:

- Isibaya
- 10 Days in Sun City
- Lockdown
- Looking For Love
- Trippin with Skhumba
- Jiva!
- The Polygamist

== Awards ==
- She won Golden Horn Award for Best Supporting Actress in a TV Soap, SATMA in 2014
- In 2018, she and Skhumba Hlophe had the most nominations for the eighth annual Comics’ Choice Awards
- She won the Flying Solo Award as well as the Comedy G Award of the 2019 Savanna Comics' Choice Awards
