= Kamogelo Mampe =

South African actress

- Born: Kamogelo Mampe; 7 December 1985 (age 40); Free State, South Africa
- Education: Performing Arts of the Free State
- Occupations: Entrepreneur, Actress, Presenter, MC, Voice-over artist
- Years active: 2003–present

Kamogelo Mampe (born 7 December 1985), is a South African entrepreneur, actress, presenter, MC and voice-over artist. She is best known for the role in the television serial Muvhango.

== Personal life ==
Mampe was born on 7 December 1985 in Free State, South Africa. She trained as an actor from the Performing Arts of the Free State (PACOFS) and later graduated with a degree in Psychology.

In 2007, she had a brief relationship with Hip-hop musician Bongani Fassie, who is the son of the late Afro-pop diva Brenda Fassie.

== Career ==
During her primary school, she started ballet and traditional dancing. However, she later excelled in Latin American and Ballroom Dancing. In 2004, she made her television debut with the role as "receptionist Palesa" in the SABC2 soap opera Muvhango. Her role became very popular and continued to play the role until 2008. In the meantime, she also played the minor role of "Jacqui" in the fifth short film of the 2006 Heartlines series, entitled "The Bet". In 2010, she played the role "Palesa" in the SABC1 original South African Netflix drama Intersexions. Then in 2013, she appeared in the Mzansi Magic telenovela Isibaya with the role "Nurse Ditsele".

== Filmography ==
Year	Film	Role	Genre	Ref.
2004	Muvhango	Palesa	TV series	
2006	Heartlines: The Bet	Jacqui	TV series	
2010	Intersexions	Palesa	TV series	
2013	Isibaya	Nurse Ditsele	TV series	
