= Little Big Mouth =

- Directed by: Gray Hofmeyr; Ziggy Hofmeyr
- Written by: Gray Hofmeyr; Ziggy Hofmeyr; Louw Venter
- Produced by: Menzi Thabede
- Starring: Nay Maps; Amanda du-Pont; James Borthwick; Brady Hofmeyr
- Cinematography: Rick Joaquim
- Music by: Jacques Moolman; Dawie de Jager
- Production company: Thabede Menzi Films
- Distributed by: Netflix
- Release date: 22 October 2021
- Running time: 1 h 34 min
- Country: South Africa
- Language: English

Little Big Mouth is a South African romantic comedy film directed and written by Gray and Ziggy Hofmeyr and co-written by Louw Venter. It premiered on Netflix on 22 October 2021.

== Cast ==
- Nay Maps as Siya
- Amanda du-Pont as Mel
- James Borthwick as Frank
- Brady Hofmeyr as Luke
- Charlie Bouguenon as Ceddie
- Georgia-Ann Alp as Alice
- Gray Hofmeyr as Oom Bremmer
- Elzabé Zietsman as Tannie Agnes
- Asgar Mahomed as Ice Cream Shop Owner

== Production ==
An initial alternate title for the film was The Trouble with Siya. Father-and-son duo Gray and Ziggy Hofmeyr directed the film. They also wrote the script with Louw Venter. The film was produced by Menzi Thabede of Thabede Menzi Films, executive produced by Asgar Mahomed, and line produced by Andea de Jager. Principal photography began in March 2021 and wrapped in April.

== Release ==
At the end of September 2021, it was confirmed Little Big Mouth would be part of Netflix's upcoming October slate. The poster was revealed on 8 October followed by a trailer on 15 October.
