= Ntuzuma =

- Location within KwaZulu-Natal Location within South Africa
- Coordinates: 29.739°S 30.949°E
- Country: South Africa
- Province: KwaZulu-Natal
- Municipality: eThekwini

Area
  - Total: 17.82 km^{2} (6.88 sq mi)

Population (2011)
  - Total: 125,394
  - Density: 7,037/km^{2} (18,220/sq mi)

Racial makeup (2011)
  - Black African: 99.5%
  - Coloured: 0.2%
  - Indian/Asian: 0.2%
  - White: 0.1%
  - Other: 0.1%

First languages (2011)
  - Zulu: 91.6%
  - English: 2.3%
  - S. Ndebele: 1.6%
  - Xhosa: 1.6%
  - Other: 2.9%
- Time zone: UTC+2 (SAST)
- Postal code (street): 4359
- PO box: 4360

Ntuzuma is a town in eThekwini in the KwaZulu-Natal province of South Africa.

With a population of 114,231 (Census 2001), Ntuzuma is the youngest of the four "PINK" (Phoenix, Inanda, Ntuzuma and KwaMashu) programme townships, and was built by the Durban City in the 1970s.

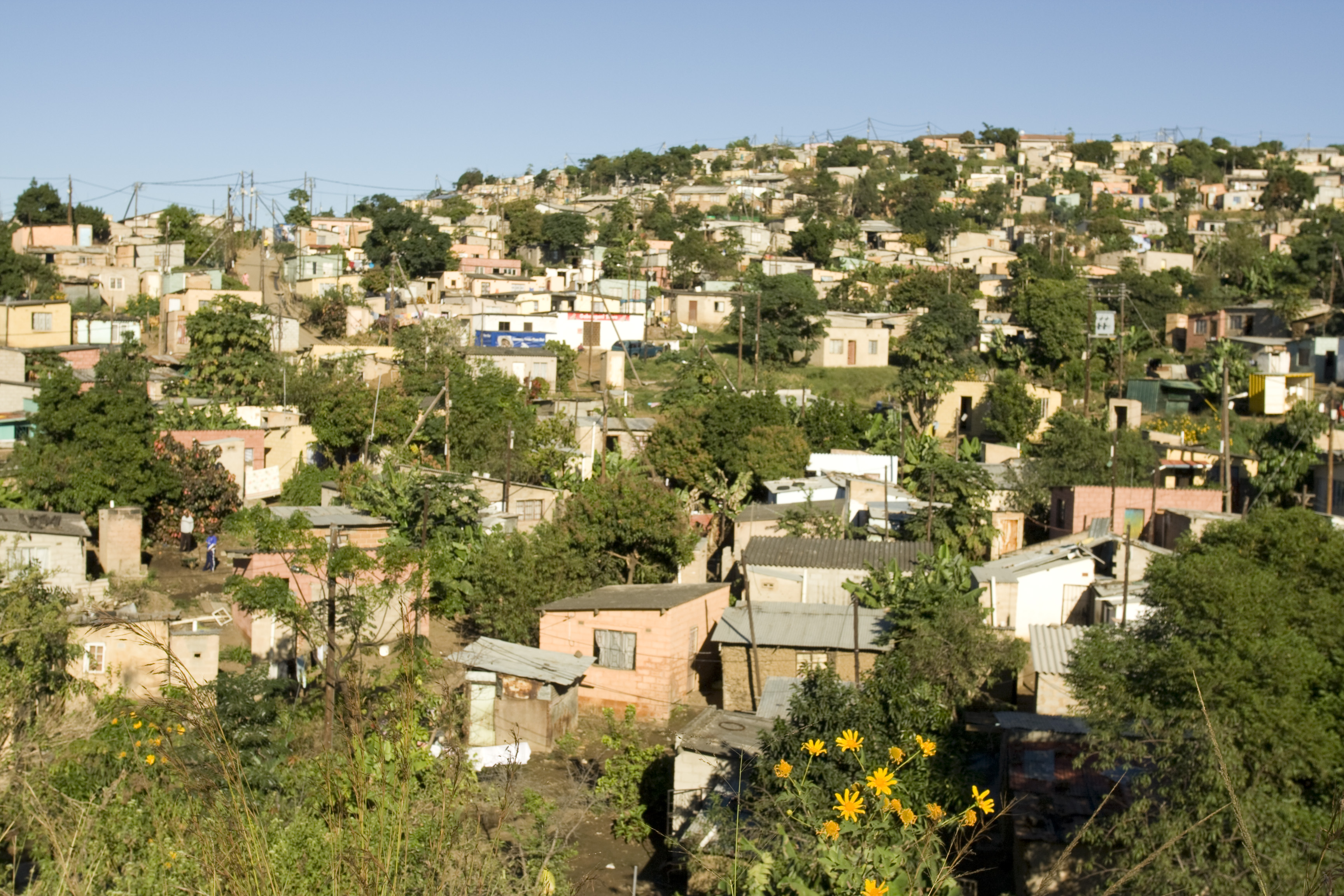

The spatial and infrastructural developments of Ntuzuma have emerged incrementally in different sections, and have, to a large extent, influenced the varying service levels, political affiliations and tenure arrangements that prevail in the area.

Large tracts of land are informally occupied due to the pressure for housing and its relative accessibility. With the RDP Housing Programme, a number of formal houses have been given to the people, which has contributed positively to the town's development plans. Ntuzuma exhibits a wide range of housing including some very up-market homes but also includes a large informal settlement. Ntuzuma's population is dominated by the working class. Ntuzuma Township is 12 km from the Durban CBD; it consists of 99.5% of Black community and 0.5% of other. It is situated near KwaMashu, Inanda, and Phoenix areas.

33% of the community is youth (18–34), that make 40% young children between 1 and 17, and 27% are adults. Many of the youth attend schools in local areas. Others can afford to get entry in multi racial schools and model C schools. Sending a child to universities is every family's dream. Many do make it to tertiary, graduate and get jobs or start Businesses Dominating transportation systems are taxis (mini buses) and buses. However, there has been an increase in people using their private cars for transportation. There are 8 senior secondary schools, 12 primary schools, one technical college and a teachers’ center. There is also a police station, petrol station, clinic, two community halls, fire station, library, small claim court and a bus depot.

There are many recreational facilities such as a swimming pool, football fields and tennis court.

== Notable people ==
- Bridget Masinga (2002 Miss South Africa, 2nd Princess, actress & businesswoman)
- Ayanda Borotho (actress)
- Mpumi (singer)
- Abdul Khoza (actor)
- Sthembiso "SK" Khoza (actor)
- Siyabonga Thuthukani Khoza (Dj)
