= Jessica Nkosi =

South African actress and TV presenter (born 1990)

- Born: Jessica Ayanda Nkosi; 20 January 1990 (age 36); Empangeni, KwaZulu-Natal, South Africa
- Other names: Jessica Nkosi; Jessica Nkosi-Dlamini
- Education: University of Kwazulu-Natal
- Occupations: Actress; TV presenter Entrepreneur; Ambassador
- Years active: 2013 - Present
- Notable work: Isibaya; The Queen
- Partner: TK Dlamini (m. 2025)
- Children: 3

Jessica Ayanda Dlamini (née Nkosi, born 20 January 1990) is a South African actress and TV presenter, best known for her leading roles in M-Net commissioned telenovelas Isibaya, Ayeye, The Queen, and Lavish.

== Early life ==
Nkosi was born in Empangeni, KwaZulu-Natal to Jabu Nkosi and Nhlanhlayethu Ntuli. Nkosi moved to Eshowe, KwaZulu-Natal after the separation of her parents. While Nkosi was in Grade 11, her father died from Hodgkin's Lymphoma.

Nkosi attended the University of KwaZulu-Natal. Although she began her studies pursuing a Bachelor's Degree in Law, she later switched to studies toward a bachelor's degree in Drama and Performing Arts from which she graduated in 2012.

== Career ==
=== Acting ===
In 2013, Nkosi debuted her acting career with the role of Qondisile on the South African telenovela Isibaya.

In 2015, she starred as Eve on Mzansi Magic's Ayeye.

In 2020, Nkosi began her role as the main female villain, Thando Sebata, on the popular South African telenovela, The Queen.

=== MC and Presenting ===
In 2017, Nkosi made her TV presenter debut as co-host on BET's A-List alongside her Isibaya co-star Nomzamo Mabtha.

Nkosi has made appearances on numerous award shows such as the Channel O Music Video Awards, the MTV Africa Music Awards, V-Entertainment and other shows. She has appeared on variety shows such as MTV's Lip Sync Battle Africa as a celebrity guest.

Nkosi first appeared on Our Perfect Wedding show as a guest presenter and later went on to host the show for the next season.

In 2024 Nkosi appeared as a contestant in The Masked Singer (South African version) under the mask of Ice Cream which was unveiled on 27 May 2024.

== Personal life ==
In September 2018, Nkosi and her partner Uzalo actor, Ntokozo Dlamini welcomed their daughter, Namisa Dlamini.
