= Vusi Kunene =

South African actor

- Born: Soweto, Johannesburg, South Africa
- Education: Wits
- Occupation: Actor
- Years active: 1993–present
- Awards: Golden Horn awards, 2011

Vusi Kunene is a South African actor, best known for his role as Jack Mabaso in Generations and its continuation, Generations: The Legacy, Funani Zwide in House of Zwide, Bhekifa in Isibaya (2014–2016), Jefferson Sibeko in Isidingo (2009–2014). He is also known for the way he speaks IsiZulu. He has appeared in 25 films and television shows since 1993. In 2011, he received the Golden Horn Award for Best Actor for the drama Soul City.

== Selected filmography ==
- Waati (1995)
- Cry, the Beloved Country (1995)
- Kini and Adams (1997)
- A Reasonable Man (1999)
- The King Is Alive (2000)
- Final Solution (2001)
- Jacob's Cross (2007–2013) as Chief Paul Lebone
- The First Grader (2010)
- State of Violence (2010)
- Paradise Stop (2011)
- Elelwani (2012)
- Isidingo (2009–2014) as Jefferson Sibeko
- Isibaya (2012–2016)
- A United Kingdom (2016) as Chief Tshekedi Khama
- Generations: The Legacy (2012–2021) as Jack Mabaso
- House of Zwide (2021–present) as Funani Zwide
- Shaka Ilembe (2023) as King Makhasane

== Achievements ==
=== South Africa Film and Television Awards ===
Year	Nominee / work	Award	Result	Ref.
2024		Best Actor in a Feature Film	Won	
