= Gugu Gumede =

South African actress

- Born: Gugu Gumede; 10 December 1991 (age 34); Natal (now KwaZulu-Natal, South Africa)
- Education: American Academy of Dramatic Arts
- Occupation: Actress
- Years active: 2013–present
- Notable work: Generations; Uzalo; The Polygamist
- Children: 1
- Mother: Zanele kaMagwaza-Msibi

Gugu Gumede (born 10 December 1991) is a South African actress born in the province of KwaZulu-Natal. She is well known for portraying the character of a prophetess, Mamlambo, in the soapie Uzalo.

== Early life ==
Gumede was born in the province of KwaZulu Natal. Her father was Simon Hulumeni Gumede and her mother was Zanele kaMagwaza-Msibi. She studied acting at the American Academy of Dramatic Arts in Los Angeles.

== Career ==
In 2013, Gumede returned from the United States and landed a role as Mandisa in Generations, one of the most successful shows in South Africa.

In 2015, Gumede was cast to portray the character of Mamlambo on the most viewed television show in South Africa, Uzalo.

In 2018, she presented the 11th Crown Gospel Music Awards alongside Somizi Mhlongo, Rebecca Malope, Clement Maosa and other celebrities.

== Filmography ==
=== Television ===
| Year | Film/Sopie | Role |
|---|---|---|
| 2013 | Generations | Mandisa |
| 2015-2024 | Uzalo | Hlengiwe MaMlambo Mhlongo |
| 2019 | EHostela | MaMkhize |
| 2024-2025 | Isiphetho - Destiny | Connie Zondo |
| 2026 | The Polygamist | Joyce Gomora |
| 2026-Present | eGagasini: Waves of Change | Phumelela Dube |

== Personal life ==
Gumede is a born-again Christian.

Gugu gave birth to her daughter on 24 March 2022.

== See also ==
- Generations the legacy
- Uzalo
- Isiphetho - Destiny
