= Rorisang Mohapi =

South African actress (born 2002)

- Born: Rorisang Mohapi; 19 April 2002 (age 24); Bloemfontein, Free State, South Africa
- Occupations: Actress; influencer
- Years active: 2024–present
- Notable work: Gqeberha: The Empire; Kwa Baba
- Spouse: Prince Grootboom (m. 2025)

Rorisang Mohapi-Grootboom (née Mohapi; born 19 April 2002) is a South African actress and influencer. She is best known playing starring roles in television series such as Gqeberha: The Empire (2024–2025) as Lulama and Kwa Baba (2026–present) as Bahumi Motaung.

== Career ==
Mohapi made her television debut in 2024, where she played the starring role of Lulama Mthimbkhlu in Mzansi Magic telenovela Gqeberha: The Empire season 2. The same year, in November, she played the villainous role Palesa in e.tv telenovela House of Zwide season 4–5. In 2025, she begged her first Netflix role where she played the role of Lala in a romantic drama Love and Wine. In 2026, she plays the lead of Bahung Motaung in Kwa Baba, and Precious Matlou in a polygamist e.tv and eVOD's television drama Bogaditsong: Sister Wives.

== Personal life ==
Mohapi is married with a fellow actor Prince Grootboom after being engaged in October 2025. They officially got married in December 2025.

== Filmography ==
=== Film ===
Year	Title	Role	Notes
2025	Love and Wine	Lala	Starring role

=== Television ===
Year	Title	Role	Notes
2024–2025	Gqeberha: The Empire	Lulama Mthimkhulu	Starring role
2024–2026	House of Zwide	Palesa	Supporting role
2026–present	Kwa Baba	Bahumi Motaung	Lead role
2026–present	Bogaditsong: Sister Wives	Precious Matlou	Main role
