= Londeka Mchunu =

South African actress

- Born: Londeka Mchunu; 10 July 1994 (age 31); Msinga, South Africa
- Education: Varsity College
- Occupations: Actress, Model
- Years active: 2016–present
- Known for: Portrayal of Zanele Zwide on House of Zwide
- Relatives: Nelisa Mchunu (sister)

Londeka Mchunu (born 10 July 1994) is a South African actress and model. She is best known for the roles in the television soap operas such as, Isithembiso, Isibaya and House of Zwide.

== Early life ==
Mchunu was born on 10 July 1994 in Msinga in a family with ten siblings. Her father died when she was 2 years old. She later grew up in Clermont, KwaZulu-Natal, South Africa, when she moved with mother at the age of 6. Her mother is a teacher. Her sister, Nelisa Mchunu is also an actress. She studied corporate communications at Varsity College.

== Career ==
In 2016, during her life at Varsity College, she made the auditions for a new telenovela produced by Bomb Productions. After impressing the producers, she got the opportunity to play the lead role "Snegugu Magwaza" on the Mzansi Magic and later Mzansi Wethu television soap opera Isithembiso in 2017. The soapie became very popular where she continued to play the role for three seasons until 2020 which included more than 700 episodes. In 2018, she was nominated for the Best Newcomer Actress on TV and Best Supporting actress on TV for the Simon Sabela Film and Television Awards as well for the role. Then in 2020, she joined with the cast of the season eight of Mzansi Magic soap opera Isibaya and made the recurring role of "Londiwe". In the same year, she joined with the e.tv soap opera House of Zwide and made the supportive role of "Zanele Zwide".

== Filmography ==
Year	Film	Role	Genre	Ref.
2017	Isithembiso	Snegugu Magwaza	TV series	
2020	Isibaya	Londiwe Ngubane	TV series	
2020	House of Zwide	Zanele Zwide	TV series	
