= The Polygamist =

South African TV series

- Genre: Netflix series
- Created by: Akin Omotoso
- Written by: Busisiwe Zwane, Nontuthuzelo Magoxo, Lorato Phefo, Nkosazana Zuma-Mncube
- Directed by: Akin Omotoso, Rolie Nikiwe, Nthabi Tau
- Starring: Gugu Gumede; S'dumo Mtshali; Kwanele Mthethwa; Celeste Ntuli; Luyanda Zwane; Wonder Ndlovu; Noluthando Shabalala; Sthandiwe Kgoroge; Kenneth Nkosi; Vuyo Biyela
- Music by: Zethu Mashika
- Country of origin: South Africa
- Original languages: Zulu; English
- No. of seasons: 1
- No. of episodes: 22

Production
- Executive producers: Gugulethu Zuma-Ncube; Thuthukile Zuma; Pepsi Pokane
- Cinematography: Akin Omotso
- Running time: 22-26 minutes
- Production company: Stained Glass TV Productions

Original release
- Network: Netflix
- Release: 12 June 2026

The Polygamist is a South African Netflix Series produced by Stained Glass TV Productions for Netflix. Upon its release on June 12, 2026, it became one of the streamer's biggest African hits, reaching No. 2 globally and No. 1 in 16 countries. By the end of its second week it ranked in the top 10 in 63 countries including the United States. The series is based on Zimbabwean author Sue Nyathi's novel of the same name.

== Premise ==
The Polygamist follows the story of Joyce Gomora, who's an audacious social media darling keeping a perfect family front, until her husband's betrayal pushes her to do the unthinkable. The series is based on the novel of the same name written by Sue Nyathi.

== Cast ==
- Gugu Gumede as Joyce Gomora who is a socialite and influencer and the legal wife of Jonasi. She is the mother of Menzi, Mpume, and Nkazimulo.
- Sdumo Mtshali as Jonasi Gomora who is a self-made business mogul and serial cheater.
  - Ntobeko Mathebula as the young Jonasi Gomora
- Kwanele Mthethwa as Matipa Nkosi
- Kenneth Nkosi as Magesh Gomora
- Noluthando Shabalala as Mpume Gomora
- Wonder Ndlovu as Menzi Gomora
- Celeste Ntuli as Essie Gomora
  - Sibusiswe Shangase as young Essie
- Lwazi Keith Tshebesha as Sarah Gomora
- Luyanda Zwane as Lindani Mbatha
- Sthandiwe Kgoroge as Mama Grace
- Vuyo Biyela as Freedom
- Siyamthanda Banda as Bongani
- Thandolwethu Olly Zondi as Xolani
- Sophie Ndaba as Herself
- Annie Mthembu as Bank Assistant
- Ferida Matsileng as Buhle

== Production ==
The TV series was produced by Stained Glass TV Productions, with executive producers including Gugu Zuma-Ncube and Thuli Zuma, two children of former president Jacob Zuma, a polygamist. One of their siblings, Nkosazana Zuma-Mncube, is also credited as a writer on the series. Thuli Zuma-Ncube said that a number of scenes were drawn directly from their family's own experiences.

Akin Omotoso served as showrunner and directed the series alongside Rolie Nikiwe and Nthabi Tau, while Busisiwe Zwane led the writing team.

== Release and reception ==
All 22 episodes of The Polygamist were released globally on Netflix on 12 June 2026. It also debuted at No. 4 on Netflix's Top 10 Non-English TV chart globally, recording two million views and 19.1 million hours viewed during its first week.

The series premiered amid ongoing public discussion of polygamy in South Africa, fueled in part by reality television programs such as Uthando Nes'Thembu. Its storylines explore the emotional, financial and health-related challenges associated with polygamous relationships, as well as the pursuit of wealth and social status, particularly from the perspective of women. The series trended across social media platforms, where much of the discussion centered on Sdumo Mtshali's portrayal of Jonasi Gomora. Viewers debated the moral ambiguity surrounding the character, questioning whether the women in Jonasi's life were victims of his manipulation or of their own ethical compromises.

== External References ==
- The Polygamist at IMDb
