= Luyanda Zwane =

South African actress and model (born 2004)

- Born: 7 February 2004 (age 22); Durban, KwaZulu Natal, South Africa
- Education: Kingsway High School
- Occupations: Actress; model; influencer
- Years active: 2022–present
- Notable work: Sibongile & The Dlaminis
- Modelling information
- Height: 1.65 m (5 ft 5 in)
- Hair colour: Black
- Eye colour: Black
- Agency: Boss Models

Luyanda Zwane (born 7 February 2004) is a South African actress, influencer and model. She is well known for her starring roles in the Mzansi Wethu telenovela Sibongile & The Dlaminis as Sibongile Mbambo and the drama series Shaka Ilembe as Vundlazi. She is also known for playing Lindani in the Netflix telenovela series The Polygamist.

== Early life ==
Zwane was born on 7 February 2004 in Durban, KwaZulu Natal. She has a twin sister, Lusanda Zwane. She attended Kingsway High School, where she excelled in drama and matriculated with five distinctions. She did not pursue higher education due to a rejected scholarship application.

== Career ==
Zwane made her television debut in 2022, playing the role of Lele in the e.tv series Durban Gen. In 2023, she played the role of Nomonde Gumede in the BET Africa telenovela Redemption. She also appeared in the Showmax series Outlaws as Phumzile and in the Netflix short film Miseducation as Aphiwe Ndima.

In 2024, she played the lead role of Sibongile Mbambo in Sibongile & The Dlaminis and in the Mzansi Magic drama series Shaka Ilembe as Vundlazi. During that year, she left Sibongile & The Dlaminis.

In 2026, she appears initially in a supporting role of Lindani on the Netflix soap opera series The Polygamist. As the series progresses, the character of Lindani becomes more of a lead character.

== Filmography ==
Year	Film	Role
2022	Durban Gen	Lelo
2023	Outlaws	Phumzile
2023	Classified	Amina
2023	Miseducation	Aphiwe Ndima
2024	Sibongile & The Dlaminis	Sibongile Mbambo
2024	Shaka Ilembe	Vundlazi
2026	The Polygamist	Lindani
2026	Spinners Season 2 †	Undisclosed
