= Victoria Girls' High School =

Location
- Grahamstown, Eastern Cape; South Africa
- Coordinates: 33°18′52″S 26°31′31.3″E

Information
- Type: state high school
- Motto: Virtute et Opera (Courage and toil)
- Staff: Principal: Mr Schmidt
- Enrolment: 425 girls from Grade 8 - 12
- Colours: Navy blue and Emerald Green
- Brother School: Graeme College
- Website: www.vghs.co.za

Victoria Girls' High School is a state (public) school in Grahamstown, South Africa with a 100% pass rate and 94% endorsement. It is a girls-only school that caters for learners from Grade 8 to Grade 12. Victoria Girls' High School is a leading school in the province. It has repeatedly produced the top matric pupil in its educational district of Cacadu. VGHS has twice, in 2007 and again in 2011, been the winner of the PetroSA Proudly South African HomeGrown Awards, "Educational Institute of the Year." The school is also a member of the Allan Gray Orbis Foundation's "Circle of Excellence. Victoria Girls' High has also been placed sixth in the Eastern Cape based on its outstanding Mathematics and Science results. Victoria Girls' High School also offers boarding facilities ranging from small and homely to large and social. Victoria Girls' High offers a wide range of facilities including the Johan Carinus Art Centre, computer centres, three science labs and a ninety-seat audio-visual presentation venue. Currently under construction is a new music centre.

== School hymn ==
The school hymn is adapted from Who Would True Valour See - by John Bunyan.

== Notable alumnae ==
- Unathi Nkayi - TV & radio presenter, singer
- Zola Nombona - Actress
