= Kwanele Mthethwa =

South African actress (born 1996)

- Born: Kwanele Mthethwa; 23 May 1996 (age 30); Durban, KwaZulu-Natal, South Africa
- Occupation: Actress
- Years active: 2019–present
- Notable work: Lobola Man; Pound 4 Pound; The Polygamist

Kwanele Mthethwa (born 23 May 1996) is a South African actress. She is best known playing lead roles in major productions such as the Netflix movie Lobola Man (2024) as Zandile, Pound 4 Pound (2024) as Sma and The Polygamist (2026) as Matipa Nkosi.

== Early life ==
Mthethwa was born on 23 May 1996, in Durban, KwaZulu-Natal, South Africa. She went to Burnwood Secondary School in Clare Hills.

== Career ==
Mthethwa made her first television debut in Mzansi Magic telenovela Isithembiso season 2 in 2019 playing the role of Ayanda. In 2020, she appeared in supranatural drama Indandatho Yokukhanya. She played the supporting role of Boity in a drama series Abomama and Showmax short television drama Umakoti Wethu playing the lead role of Nobuhle. The same year, she played the recurring role of Phumeza in The Queen season 5.

In 2022, Mthethwa played the lead in Mzansi Magic drama series Umbuso as Lihle. The same year, she also played the lead role in BET Africa original telenovela Redemption as Faith Zikode. She made her first Netflix role in 2024, in a romantic comedy drama Lobola Man playing the main role of Zandile. The same year, she starred in BET boxing drama series Pound 4 Pound as Sma.

Mthethwa played the role of Nobuntu Gumede in Umkhokha in 2023 after she replaced Khwezi Ndlovu and left in late 2024. In 2026, she appeared in the Netflix drama series The Polygamist playing the lead role of Matipa Nkosi. She is currently playing the starring role of Khethiwe Mkhize in Kwa Baba season 1.

== Filmography ==
=== Film ===
Year	Title	Role	Notes
2020	Indandatho Yokukhanya		Lead role
2021	Umhlukanisi		Starring role
2021	Umakoti Wethu	Nobuhle	Lead role
2022	Induku	Khethiwe Shibe	Lead role
2024	Lobola Man	Zandile	Lead role

=== Television ===
Year	Title	Role	Notes
2019	Isithembiso	Ayanda	Recurring role
2021	Abomama	Boity	Recurring role
2021	The Queen	Phumeza	Recurring role
2022	Entangled	Mbali	Supporting role
2022	Umbuso	Thembilihle	Lead role
2022	Redemption	Faith Zikode	Lead role
2022	The Executive	Dudu	Main role
2023	In The Dock	Nolitha	Main role
2023–2024	Umkhokha	Nobuntu	Main role
2024	Pound 4 Pound	Sma	Main role
2026	The Polygamist	Matipa Nkosi	Lead role
2026–present	Kwa Baba	Khethiwe Mkhize	Main role
