= Gaisang Noge =

South African actress and influencer (born1996)

Gaisane Noge
- Born: Gaisane Keaikitse Noge; 15 June 1996 (age 30); Vaal Triangle, Gauteng, South Africa
- Education: AFDA
- Occupations: Actress; influencer; entrepreneur
- Years active: 2021–present
- Parents: Dosto Noge (father); Matsie Noge (mother)

Gaisang Keaikitse Noge (born 15 June 1996) is a South African actress, influencer, media personality and entrepreneur. She is well known for playing a lead role of Naledi on The Wife season 3 and e.tv series House of Zwide as Mampho Mokoena.

== Early life ==
Noge was born on 15 June 1996, in Vaal Triangle, Gauteng, South Africa. She is the daughter of TV presenter, Dosto Noge and Matsie Noge. In 2017 she graduated from AFDA obtained Degree in Film and Television.

== Career ==
Noge was passionate about acting from a young age, and her parents supported her dream. She participated in the drama club during her school days. Her first appearance on TV was in the Mzansi Magic movie Efa Motho Motho. In 2021, she portrayed as Karabo in BoMma. Later that year, she played a role of Mampho Mokoena in a e.tv series House of Zwide. In February 2022, she played Mavis in Thando a film produced by Bakwena Films about Thando. She also played a lead role on The Wife as Naledi.

== Filmography ==
Year	Film	Role	Notes
2021	BoMma	Karabo	Lead role
2021–present	House of Zwide	Mampho Mokoena	Starring role
2022	The Wife	Naledi	Lead role, season 3
2022	Thando	Mavis	Main role
2023	How to manifest a man	Ntobi	Lead role, season 1 & 2
2023	Sex In The City	Yoliswa	Supporting role
2025	Adulting	Mapaseka	Supporting role, season 2
