= Ntando Rambani =

South African television personality

- Born: 29 August 1995 (age 30); Orange Farm, Johannesburg, South Africa
- Other name: Ntando Rambani
- Citizenship: South Africa
- Occupations: Actress; Model; TV Personality
- Years active: 2014–present
- Known for: Rhythm City
- Political party: EFF
- Spouse: Una Rams (m. 2025)
- Children: 2

Ntando Rambani (nee Duma born 29 August 1995) is a South African actress, television personality, and model. She gained prominence as a presenter on e.tv's youth programming block Craz-e, where she featured on Craz-e World Live. She is also known for her portrayal of Zinzi Dandala on Rhythm City and her role in the historical drama series Shaka iLembe.

== Early life ==
Ntando Rambani was born in the township of Orange Farm in Johannesburg, Gauteng. She was raised by her mother and grandmother alongside three siblings, including her sister, Thando Duma. Growing up in Orange Farm, located approximately 45 km from Johannesburg, she developed an early interest in performing arts.

== Personal life ==
Ntando Rambani has a daughter, Sbahle Mzizi. In 2023, Sbahle, six years old at the time, became the youngest CEO in South Africa by opening a children's salon, Sbahle Siyakhula in Johannesburg.

Ntando frequently shares moments with Sbahle on her social media platforms, highlighting their close bond and mutual support.

Sbahle has pursued entrepreneurial work, and her mother, Ntando, has supported her endeavours.

In February 2025 she married Grammy award-winning Songwriter and musician Una Rams She later welcomed her second child with husband in July 2025 shortly after revealing she was married. In late July Rambani revealed she welcomed her second child a baby girl and their first with her husband Una Rams.

== Career ==
=== Television ===
Rambani's entertainment career began in June 2014 when she joined e.tv's Craz-e as a presenter. She later secured a role in Rhythm City as Zinzi Dandala, which significantly elevated her profile in South African television.

In 2020, Rambani joined the cast of the popular telenovela ‘‘The Queen’’, portraying the character Mpho Sebata. However, in June 2021, it was announced that she would be leaving the production to pursue new opportunities.

In 2023, Rambani joined the cast of the historical drama series ‘‘Shaka iLembe’’, portraying Queen Bhibhi kaSompisi, the ninth wife of Shaka’s father, Senzangakhona. Her performance as Bhibhi has been described as a role that audiences “love to hate,” highlighting her ability to captivate viewers with complex characters.

Rambani expressed her gratitude for the opportunity, sharing her excitement about joining the series and her appreciation for the role.

“Shaka iLembe” premiered on June 18, 2023, on Mzansi Magic, and quickly became a significant success, attracting 3.6 million viewers in its first week, setting a record for the channel.

The series has been acclaimed for its storytelling and production quality, earning 17 nominations at the South African Film and Television Awards (SAFTAs) in September 2024, and winning 12 awards, including Best TV Drama.

Rambani's involvement in “Shaka iLembe” further solidifies her status as a prominent figure in the South African entertainment industry, showcasing her versatility and commitment to diverse roles.

=== Modelling ===
She has established herself in the fashion industry, participating in notable events including the Soweto fashion week runway shows in 2015 and 2017.

== Philanthropy ==
Rambani founded the Inspire A Teen SA Foundation, focusing on youth empowerment across South Africa. She has initiated various community projects, including the "Keep A Child Warm" campaign, which provided blankets to orphanages in Johannesburg.
