= Sue Nyathi =

Zimbabwean author (born 1978)

- Born: Sukoluhle Nyathi; 23 June 1978 (age 48); Bulawayo, Zimbabwe
- Education: National University of Science and Technology, Zimbabwe (Master of Science)
- Occupations: Writer; Screenwriter; Investment analyst
- Years active: 2012–present
- Notable work: The Polygamist (2012), The Gold Diggers (2018), A Family Affair (2020), An Angel's Demise (2022)
- Television: Matatiele (TV series) (2015); Bone of my bones (2017); The Polygamist (2026)
- Website: suenyathi.co.za

Sukoluhle "Sue" Nyathi (born 23 June 1978) is a Zimbabwean author and investment analyst based in South Africa.

== Literary career ==
She began writing at the age of 20. Her debut novel and bestseller The Polygamist was published in 2012. Her second book The Gold Diggers released in 2018 received literary acclaim and was longlisted for the Dublin Literary Award as well as the Barry Ronge Fiction Prize. She released her third book titled A Family Affair in 2020. Her fourth book was released in 2022 titled An Angel's Demise.

In 2021 she was shortlisted for the Morland Writing Scholarships.

== Personal life ==
Nyathi was born in Bulawayo, Zimbabwe on 23 June 1978 and is of Northern Ndebele origin. Her name Sukoluhle means a beautiful night. She left Zimbabwe in 2008 and moved to Johannesburg, South Africa where she currently resides. She holds a Master of Science degree in Finance and Investment from the National University of Science and Technology, Zimbabwe.

== Television ==
In 2015 she was invited by director Rolie Nikiwe to be a screenwriter for the e.tv drama Matatiele. Nikiwe had read Nyathi's The Polygamist and found she would be a good fit for the 22-episode drama. In 2026 Netflix adapted the book into a 22 episode supernovela with the same title.

She also worked on Bone of My Bones in 2017 for SABC 2.

== Bibliography ==
| Year | Title | Ref |
|---|---|---|
| 2012 | The Polygamist | |
| 2018 | The Gold Diggers | |
| 2020 | A Family Affair | |
| 2022 | An Angel's Demise | |
