= Khaya Dladla =

South African actor and musician

- Born: Khaya Dladla; 3 April 1990 (age 36); Umlazi, South Africa
- Occupations: Actor, model, musician, Radio host
- Years active: 2013–present
- Known for: Uzalo as G.C
- Spouse: Mercutio Buthelezi

Khaya Dladla (born 3 April 1990) is a South African actor, musician, model and tv presenter. He is best known for the role "GC" in the television soapie Uzalo. and now currently playing a role of Lazarus on House Of Zwide.

== Personal life ==
Dladla was born on 3 April 1989 in Umlazi, South Africa as the fifth child in a family with six siblings. His father is Reggie Dladla, and mother is Thandi Dladla. He completed primary education from Isipingo Hills Primary School. In 2006, he matriculated from Brettonwood High School. He completed a Diploma in Advertising from the Varsity College. Then he graduated with his Bachelor of Arts degree in Marketing and Communications from the University of South Africa (UNISA).

He is married to his longtime boyfriend, Mercutio Buthelezi.

== Career ==
In 2013, he acted in the SABC 1soap opera Uzalo by playing the role "G.C.". The show became very popular and he won the Best Supporting Actor award at the Simon Sabela Awards for his role. In 2016, he participated as a model at the Durban Fashion Fair. After that show, he appeared with the role of "Nxebale Ndoda" in the Mzansi television serial eHostela. In 2021, he joined with the television serial House of Zwide and played the role "Lazarus". Later in mid 2021, he joined again with the soapie Uzalo.

He is also a musician and worked in the music group Salt & Light. He worked as a background vocalist for the musicians such as Hugh Masekela, Salif Keita and Thandiswa Mazwai. Recently he has featured in YoungStar's "INGOMA" and "Indovozi". Recently he started a radio gig at a KZN radio station, Gagasi FM.

In early November 2024, Khaya hosted the 16th ceremony of annual Feather Awards, alongside Dineo Moeketsi, and Andiswa P Gebashe.

== Filmography ==
Year	Film	Role	Genre	Ref.
2015	Uzalo	G.C.	TV series	
2021	eHostela	Nxebale Ndoda	TV series	
2021	House of Zwide	Lazarus	TV series	
