= Brettonwood High School =

Location
- 399 Oliver Lea Drive, Umbilo, P.O. Box 41635; Durban, KwaZulu-Natal; South Africa
- Coordinates: 29.8930°S 30.9721°E

Information
- School type: Public School
- Motto: Audicior (boldness)
- Established: 1966
- Locale: Suburban
- Principal: Mrs. E. Zizhou
- Grades: 8-12
- Language: English, IsiZulu, Afrikaans
- Houses: Jaguar; Leopard; Lion; Tiger
- Colors: Yellow; White; Black

Brettonwood High School, in Durban, South Africa, opened in January 1966, is named after Brettonwood Avenue, which is at the intersection of the main entrance. It was known as Brettonwood Boys' High School until it became co-educational at the start of the academic year in January 1974. The school's motto is "Audacior", meaning very bold, extremely courageous, more daring (than the rest).

== History ==
The first headmaster was Cyril Harcourt, an Englishman who had served with the Royal Navy during the Second World War. His English background was evident in the traditions introduced into the school.

The school uniform was a black blazer with badge, long grey trousers (envoy 4244 "Special Grey for Brettonwood" with 1 inch Turn ups), white shirt, black shoes and a boater. The full uniform, excluding boater, was required to be worn when outside the classroom and with the boater when outside the school.

In the school's first year there were four classes, two of standard 6 and two of standard 7. In 1969 the school had its first matriculation class.

During the initial years sports were restricted to rugby, cricket and athletics. A wider range is now offered.

Brettonwood High School is the only co-educational English-speaking school in Durban along with Thomas More College (South Africa).

== Notable alumni ==
- Ayanda Borotho, actress
- Gary Anderson, former NFL placekicker
- Khaya Dladla, TV and radio personality, actor
