= Ayanda Borotho =

South African actor

Ayanda MaNgubane Borotho
- Born: Ayanda Ngubane; 13 January 1981 (age 45); Ntuzuma, Durban, KwaZulu-Natal, South Africa
- Education: Brettonwood High School; AAA School of Advertising
- Occupation: Actress
- Years active: 1999–present
- Works: Isibaya, Generations: The Legacy and Shaka Ilembe
- Spouse: Dr. Filike Borotho
- Children: 3

Ayanda Borotho (Née Ngubane; born 13 January 1981) is a South African actress and former model best known for playing the title role in the SABC 1 sitcom Nomzamo, from 2007 to 2010, in which she replaced Zinzile Zungu, as well as Phumelele Zungu on Mzansi Magic’s telenovela Isibaya.

== Early life ==
Ayanda Borotho was born on 13 January 1981 in the township of Ntuzuma near the city of Durban in the KwaZulu-Natal province of South Africa. She attended Brettonwood High School in Umbilo, Durban where she was trained in speech and drama. She completed a diploma in Integrated Marketing Communications at the AAA School of Advertising from 1999 to 2001, specialising in strategic brand management.

== Career ==
She began her acting career in 1999 after landing the role of babysitting schoolgirl Thami in the SABC 1 soapie Generations. In 2000, she had a minor role in the Leon Schuster film Mr Bones. In 2007 She replaced Zinzile Zungu as Nomzamo in the SABC 1 sitcom Nomzamo from season two. Borotho played the minor role of Busi in the fourth season of the SABC 1 drama series Home Affairs, in 2009. In 2013, Borotho was cast as Phumelele on Mzansi Magic's telenovela IsiBaya. In 2018, she was cast as Khethiwe in a South African television drama series Ambition in 2022 the actress landed a notable role on SABC 1's Generation's The Legacy as Dr Busisiwe. She also plays as Queen Nandi's mother in Shaka Ilembe.

== Filmography ==
Movies
Year	Film	Role	Note
2009-2011	Nomzamo	Nomzamo Zuli	
2013 – 2020	Isibaya	Phumelele Dlamini Zungu-Molefe	
2019	Losing Lerato	Principal Modise	
2021-2021	Wounds	Agnes Ndamase	TV Series
2022	Shaka Inkosi YamaKhosi	Queen Nandi	Short
2022-2023	Generations: The Legacy	Dr Busisiwe "NaMlambo"Dzedze	
2023 June 18	Shaka iLembe	Mfunda	5 episodes
2017-2023	The Legacy	Khewzi Dabula	Main Role Seasons 1-5 Recurring Role Seasons 6-7
2023	The River (South African TV series)	Zanemvula	12 episodes
2023	Sibongile & The Dlamini's	Phetheni Dlamini	
2025	Ithonga	Thandeka "MaKhumalo" Magwaza	
2025	Meet the Khumalos	Bongi Sithole	

== Personal life ==
Borotho is married to a doctor and they have three children. She stated that in her household she has a strict "no English policy". Her children speak Zulu and Sotho at home.

== Accolades ==
- She was nominated at MIPAD Awards.
