= House of Zwide =

South African drama series

- Genre: Telenovela; Fashion; Drama; Romance
- Created by: The Bomb Shelter
- Inspired by: House of Aside by Brenda Mukwevho; Vusi Kunene
- Written by: Sydney Dire; Catherine Stewart; Ephraim Sitsha; Glenrose Ndlovu; Londeka Mchunu
- Directed by: Adze Ugah; Angus Gibson; Phiwee Mkhanzi; Catherine Stewart
- Starring: Winnie Ntshaba; Jeffery Sekele; Nefisa Mkhabela; Wanda Zuma; Mduduzi Mabaso; Matshepo Maleme; Khaya Dladla; Gaisang Noge; Paballo Mavundla; Tsholofelo Matshaba; Thato Dithebe; Rorisang Mohapi; Brenda Mukwevho; Lois du Plessis; Linda Nxumalo; Lindokuhle Mbonani; Karabo Magongwa; Tebogo Sefaro; Lucia Mashaba; Kwanele Mkhize; Tshwarelo Letsapa
- Country of origin: South Africa
- No. of seasons: 5

Production
- Executive producers: Desireé Markgraaf; Anant Singh
- Producers: Maqubool Mahomed; Thabo Boom
- Production companies: The Bomb Shelter; Videovision Entertainment

Original release
- Network: e.tv
- Release: 19 July 2021 – 26 June 2026

House of Zwide was a South African television drama series. It was an e.tv original production, co-produced by The Bomb Shelter and Videovision Entertainment for e.tv. The series starrey Vusi Kunene, Nefisa Mkhabela, Jeffery Sekele, Winnie Ntshaba, Wanda Zuma and among others.

== Premise ==
=== Season 1 ===
Funani and Faith Zwide are presented as the founders of House of Zwide, a fashion and textile company in the series.

In the early stages of the company, Faith who was Funani's secretary had an affair with Funani. His wife found out about it and Faith went to her, trying to explain and apologise but instead; she and Funani's wife (Busi) fought.

In the fight, Faith stabbed Busi (Funani's wife) with a scissors in the neck and unfortunately, she died. Panicking, Faith called Isaac, a hitman whom is her ex-boyfriend to come and help her. Since Isaac would do anything for Faith because he still loved her, he helped her.

Isaac and Faith plotted on burning down the house with Busi inside so it could look like her death was a result of the fire. Faith leaves and Isaac starts on the job.

Isaac succeeds in burning down the house, not knowing that Nkosi and Zobuhle, Busi and Funani's kids were there. Getting out, Isaac hears a newborn baby; Zobuhle's cry and he fails to leave it to die but instead decides to raise it as his own. He names the baby Onalerona.

In her twenties, she aspires to be the best designer in the industry but doesn't know the past is yet to haunt her.

Starring: Vusi Kunene, Nefisa Mkhabela & Bawinile Ntshaba

=== Season 2 ===
Picking up from the previous season's events, the truth details the normal everyday lives of both the Zwide and Molapo families. Funani unleashes her wrath on Faith and Isaac, and Ona struggles with her newfound identity and is not ready to accept it. This season introduces a new villain to Funani. Alex Khadzi (Warren Masemola), a villain who is in a fashion war with Funani and will do anything to take Funani down. Faith gets divorced by Funani and sentences her to the life of poverty but Faith moves in with Shoki and Soka trying to regain her lavish lifestyle.

Starring: Warren Masemola, Vusi Kunene

=== Season 3 ===
The storyline begins with a heartbreaking news for The Zwide's as they lost one of their own. Faith and Funani are in denial of their son Senzo Zwide's passing. Molefe received news that he is going to be a father as Dorothy is revealed pregnant. The Zwide's are forced to live with their new enemy Nandipha Khadzi who is here to avenge the death of her brother Alex Khadzi

Starring: Keabestwe KB Mamosadi Mostilanyane &Vusi Kunene

=== Season 4 ===
The season starts soon after Nandipha's tragic death. Busie comes back to the Zwides safe. Funani decides to leave House of Zwide he started from scratch. Funani leaves his legacy to Nkosikhona and Zobuhle. Msizi Faith's ex-convict brother comes back to her life. That threatens Faith's happiness. The is love brewing between Isaac and Maria. Mampho and her cousin Thato start their own fashion label.

Starring: Bawinile Ntshaba and Nefisa Mkhabela

=== Season 5 ===
Following Shoki's tragic death, Nkosi spirals out of control and has to leave for KZN to centre himself leaving Faith and Ona to run the HOZ collective together and Ona securing a high-profile contract which puts her in the spotlight. A traditional healer helps Nkosi and works her way into the Zwide family. Meanwhile, Pastor Ezekiel a crooked pastor establishes a strongho;ld in Tembisa and intends to run for councillor as Isaac reluctantly enters politics to save the community from the influence of Pastor Ezekiel

Starring: Bawinile Ntshaba and Nefisa Mkhabela

== Characters ==
List of cast members

- Vusi Kunene as Funani Zwide: South Africa's biggest and most influential fashionista; The owner, founder and CEO of House of Zwide; He had a huge crush on Reabetswe Molapo; Zobuhle, Nkosi and Senzo's father; Zanele's adoptive step father; Faith's ex-husband; Busi's widower; Shoki's father-in-law; Busi Jr's grandfather; He will do anything to for his family (Main role; 2021–2024)
- Winnie Ntshaba as Faith: Funani's ex-wife and co-founder of the House of Zwide; She and Isaac know the truth about Ona but they are trying to hide it; She is the one who left Funani's mother to die; She killed Busi, mother of Nkosi and Ona (Main role; 2021–Present)
- Jeffery Sekele as Isaac Molapo: An Umkhonto we Sizwe veteran and former gangster. He is Faith Zwide's ex; He is not Ona's real father; He actually stole her when burning the house of Funani Zwide helping Faith; He is now married to Rea Molapo until her untimely death, Keletso's father; Ona's foster father (Main role; 2021—Present)
- Nefisa Mkhabela as Onalerona "Ona" Molapo or Zobuhle Zwide: Busi and Funani's youngest daughter; Isaac and Rea's foster daughter. Nkosi and Senzo's sister; Zanele's foster sister; Shoki's friend & sister in law; A young woman who aspires to be in fashion industry. She finds herself in the House Of Zwide pursuing her passion. She had brief relationships with Sandile and Soka. She is The real Zobuhle. Soka and Neo's ex-girlfriend (main role; 2021—Present)
- Matshepo Maleme as Reabetswe "Rea" Molapo: Isaac's late wife. She is burdened with the secret that Ona is not her and Isaac's daughter. She is Molefe's sister. She is Keletso's mother. She later got involved in an affair with Funani Zwide but ended things when realising what's at stake; she had cancer but succumbed to her illness on 26 February 2024 (Main role; 2021–2024)(dead)
- Khaya Dladla as Lazarus: Funani's friend and confidanté. He is responsible for interpreting and creating Funani's designs. Obsessed with neatness and immaculately groomed, he has a no nonsense attitude (main role; 2021—Present)
- Shalate Sekhabi as Reshoketswe "Shoki" Zwide: She was the wife of Nkosi Zwide and sister to Nomsa Phiri. She was a world class model and was also the face of House of Zwide. She was Onalerona's best friend and Busi stepmother also Soka's cousin. She died after a tragic car accident in season 5 premiere (Main role; 2021–2025)
- Londeka Mchunu as Zanele Zwide: Faith's daughter. Funani's foster daughter. While adored by her father, she desperately seeks her mother's approval. She proves to be a valuable asset to the business by being a social media influencer. Senzo, Onalerona and Nkosi's half-sister. Zola's ex gf and baby mama (but she had a miscarriage) (Supporting Main Role; 2021–2024)
- Wanda Zuma as Nkosikhona 'Nkosi' Zwide: The gracious handsome son of Funani and Busi Zwide. He is a loving husband of the late Shoki and incredible father to his daughter Busisiwe Keneilwe Zwide to whom he shares with the villainous Mampho Mokwena. He is the former Chief Financial Operator (CFO) at House of Zwide. He is Zanele, Onalerona and Senzo Zwide's elder brother (Supporting Main Role; 2021–2026)
- Paballo Mavundla as Sandile:He is an intern at House of Zwide. He was in a brief relationship with Onalerona and was friends with benefits with Zanele Zwide until she was in a relationship with Zola (Supporting Main Role; 2021—Present)
- Karabo Mapongwa as Keletso: She is Isaac and Rea Molapo's youngest daughter. She is an intelligent grade 7 learner and was recently bullied by her friends for "snitching" but later stood up for herself. Onalerona's adoptive sister (Supporting Main Role; 2021—Present)
- Lwazi Mthembu as Nomsa: She is a fashion designer and she is playing a role of a mother to her younger sister Shoki since their grandmother's death. She is Molefe's former girlfriend and was also involved in a love triangle with Dorothy and Molefe (Supporting Main Role; 2021–2023)
- KB Mamosadi as Nandipha "The Ghost" Khadzi : She is the sister of Alex Khadzi ( Warren Masemola) who becomes Faith and Funani Zwide's dangerously determined enemy who has come to avenge the death of her brother. She killed Senzo Zwide who was Funani and Faith Zwide's son in Season 2 finale and later got Funani and Isaac arrested for murder of her brother. She has nothing to lose but more to gain by destroying the Zwide family but tables turned and she was in jail until she escaped and she was killed by Funani in Season 3 finale (Main supporting Role; 2023–2024) (Dead)
- Thato Dithebe as Neo Zwane: First and former personal fashion assistance of the late Alex Khadzi; Former dedicated House of Zwide worker; Ona's ex-boyfriend (Supporting Role; 2022–2024)
- Gaisang Noge as Mampho Zulu: She is the villainous mother of Busisiwe Keneilwe Zwide to whom she shares with the gracious Nkosi Zwide. She is Maria's daughter and big fan of the dangerous Faith Zwide. She worked as intern in House of Zwide but was cast out after blackmailing Nkosi Zwide. Now running her own fashion line she returned at HOZ as part of the collective. She is later married to Sokalezwe (Supporting Main Role; 2021–Present)
- Tsholofelo Mashaba as Maria Mokwena: She is dramatic mother of the vicious Mampho Mokwena. She is slay Queen in curse of poverty-stricken Tembisa. She was currently working for Reabetswe Molapo as an assistant at the salon until her death in Feb 2024. She is Thato's aunt. She is in love with Isaac (Supporting Role; 2023–Present)
- Tebogo Sefora as Thato Mokwena: He is the well talented fashion designer who is also cousin to the villainous Mampho Mokwena. He is revealed as gay in Season 4 and Laz's crush. He later friends Ona, Sandile and Neo.

== Former Cast members ==
- Vusi Kunene, (cMain) (Seasons 1–3), (cGuest)
- Funani Zwide
- Matshepo Maleme (cMain) (Seasons 1–3)
- Rea Molapo
- Wanda Zuma (Main) (Seasons 1-5)
- Nkosi Zwide (cRecurring) (Season 6)
- Shalate Sekhabi (cMain) (Seasons 1–4)
- Shoki Zwide
- Londeka Mchunu (cMain) (Seasons 1–3) (cRecurring) (Season 4)
- Lwazi Mthembu (cMain) (Seasons 1–2) (cRecurring) (Season 3,5)
- Nomsa Phiri

== Cast ==
| Actors | Characters | Seasons | | | | | |
| Actors | Characters | Season 1 | Season 2 | Season 3 | Season 4 | Season 5 | Season 6 |
|---|---|---|---|---|---|---|---|
| Winnie Ntshaba | Faith Zwide | Main | Main | Main | Main | Main | Main |
| Jeffery Sekele | Isaac Molapo | Main | Main | Main | Main | Main | Main |
| Nefisa Mkhabela | Ona Molapo Zwide | Main | Main | Main | Main | Main | Main |
| Mduduzi Mabaso | Msizi Shange | | | | Main | Main | |
| Wanda Zuma | Nkosi Zwide | Main | Main | Main | Main | Main | Guest |
| Tsholofelo Matshaba | Maria Mokwena | | Recurring | Main | Main | Main | Main |
| Khaya Dladla | Lazzurus Laz Ngcobo | Main | Main | Main | Main | Main | Main |
| Louis Du-Plessis | Pearl | Main | Main | Main | Main | Main | Main |
| Linda Nxumalo | Soka Zulu | Main | Main | Main | Main | Main | Main |
| Paballo Mavundla | Sandile Ndlovu | Main | Main | Main | Main | Main | Main |
| Gaisang Noge | Mampho Zulu | Main | Main | Main | Main | Main | Main |
| Tebogo Sefora | Thato Mokwena | | | | Main | Main | Main |
| Thato Dithebe | Neo Zwane | | Recurring | Recurring | Recurring | Recurring | Main |

Cast As Per Opening Sequence

- Bawinile Ntshaba
- Mduduzi Mabaso
- Jeffery Sekele
- Linda Nxumalo
- Tebogo Sefora
- Wanda Blaq Zuma
- Shalate Sekhabi
- Khaya Dladla
- Motlatse Mafatse
- Paballo Mavundla
- Louis Du-Plessis
- Tsholofelo Matshaba
- Nefisa Mkhabela

== Production ==
On 24 November 2020 it was announced that long-running e.tv soapie Rhythm City is being canceled. The channel said that the decision to end the series was part of a business strategy.

In February 2021, The Bomb Shelter sent out a casting call for the female lead role of the series, which at the time had been unspecified. The lead character is described as ambitious and independent woman who loves fashion. Entrants had to send a one-minute monologue to The Bomb Shelter via email before 28 February.

On 9 June, the channel had a press release, announcing that House of Zwide would be the replacement for Rhythm City.

On 24 June, the channel released the official trailer for House of Zwide.

== Broadcast ==
The series premiered on 19 July 2021 on e.tv. It was then added to e.tv's streaming service eVOD, with 5 episodes added ahead of the linear channel's premiere. The series ended its on run on the 26th Of June 2026 after 5 successful seasons.

== Reception ==
The series, throughout its run, has retained its predecessor's position as the channel's second most-watched series, peaking at 4.58 million viewers.

However, in 2022, viewers expressed discontent at what they thought was recycling of old storylines.

On 20 February e.tv announced that the show would not be renewed for a season with the fifth season final episode set to drop on 26 June 2026.
