= Paballo Mavundla =

South African actor

- Born: 11 June 1999 (age 27); Soweto, Gauteng, South Africa
- Education: The National School of the Arts
- Occupation: Actor
- Years active: 2018-Present

Paballo Mavundla (born 11 June 1999) is a South African actor known for his debut role Nkosana on Mzansi Magic's supernatural drama series The Herd and as Jerah Moroka on Generations: The Legacy.

== Background ==
Mavundla was born in the Meadowlands of the heart of South Western Soweto in the Gauteng Province. The actor matriculated with a bachelor in Dramatic Arts from the National School of the Arts, Johannesburg in 2017. He later revealed that being at the institution played a vital role throughout in his career.

== Career ==
After several times of auditioning and not receiving a role, the actor landed his first professional job in the supernatural drama The Herd, where he depicted the role of a naughty and rebellious teen, Nkosana.

He later joined the SABC1 soapie Generations: The Legacy in November 2018. He was tasked with the role of Jerah Moroka also known as Crazy J, a misbehaved cousin of the Morokas who is a varsity student and later works at Ezweni Communications. He is currently playing the role of Sandile in eTVs House of Zwide.

== Filmography ==
Year	Title	Role	Notes	Ref.
2018	The Herd	Nkosana	leading role	
2018–2020	Generations: The Legacy	Jerah Moroka	recurring role	
2021	House of Zwide	Sandile	recurring role	
