= Linda Sokhulu =

South African actress

- Born: 13 September 1976 (age 49); Durban, KwaZulu-Natal, South Africa
- Education: Technikon Natal
- Occupation: Actress
- Known for: Isidingo; Generations; Rhythm City

Linda Sokhulu (born 13 September 1976) is a South African actress. In 2014, she received best actress nomination at the 10th Africa Movie Academy Awards.

== Career ==
Starting in 2004, Sokhulu played "Cleo Khuzwayo" in Generations. In 2013, Sokhulu starred in her first feature film, Felix, and played the role of the mother of an aspiring teenage saxophonist. She got nominated for best actress at SAFTA and Africa Movie Academy Awards. The film also won awards at Durban International Film Festival, where it was described as "a worthy contender with any Hollywood blockbuster". In 2007, she played "Nomathemba" in local soap Ubizo: The Calling. In 2008, she play "Pamela" in Sokhulu & Partners. On 27 January 2022, Sokhulu joined the cast of 7de Laan in a contract starring role.

She voices secret agent Mama K in the upcoming animated series, Supa Team 4.

=== Filmography ===
- Isidingo
- Generations (2004 - 2007)
- A Place Called Home (2006)
- Ubizo: The Calling (2007)
- Shreds and Dreams (2010 & 2014)
- Felix (2013)
- Rhythm City (2019)
- Umkhokha (2021)
- 7de Laan (2022)
- Isiphetho - Destiny (2024 - 2025)

=== Accolades ===
- 2012 Golden Horn Award for Best Actress in a Lead Role in a TV drama
- 2016 Golden Horn Award for Best Actress in a Lead Role in a TV drama
- 2016 Golden Horn Award for Best Supporting Actress in a TV soap
- 2017 Golden Horn Award for Best Actress in a Lead Role in a TV drama
- Africa Movie Academy Award for Best Actress in a Leading Role

== Personal life ==
Sokhulu was born on 13 September 1976, in Durban, however she spent her formative years in Umlazi. She attended St. Anne's Diocesan College in Hilton, KwaZulu-Natal near Pietermaritzburg (1990-1993) before attending Cambridge College in 1994 then studied fashion at Technikon Natal.
