= Andile Gumbi =

South African actor and singer (1983-2019)

- Born: Andile Gumbi; 10 September 1983; Durban, South Africa
- Died: 25 October 2019 (aged 36); Jerusalem, Israel
- Occupations: Actor; dancer; singer; model
- Years active: 1999–2019

Andile Gumbi (10 September 1983 – 25 October 2019) was a South African actor, dancer, singer and model. He is best known for the role "Zweli Ngubane" in the television serial Isibaya.

== Personal life ==
Andile was born on 10 September 1983 in Durban, South Africa. He was married to Hlengiwe Ngcongo. In 2016, he was arrested and charged with assault after he allegedly attacked and punched his wife and dragged her on the floor. Then he spent Freedom Day in jail and then appeared in the Randburg Magistrate's Court. He was later released after his court appearance.

On 22 October 2019, he was hospitalized following a heart attack while he was in Israel for a theatre production. He was in a coma and treated in the ICU at the Shaare Zedek Medical Centre in Israel for three days. He later died on 25 October 2019 at the age of 36.

In December 2019, his 4-year-old son allegedly shot himself in the lower body when he was handling a firearm. He was soon hospitalized with minor injuries.

== Career ==
Before entering drama, he was a member of Abanqobi Musical Group from 1999 to 2004. In 2004, Gumbi first starred in "The Lion King's" Australian company by appearing in many advertisements worldwide. Later Gumbi rendered his voice to the "adult Simba", in Disney's long-running Broadway stage musical The Lion King. He played the popular role from August 28, 2012 through August 25, 2013. Apart from that, he also performed in the theatre plays such as; Lalela, The Lion King, Ntsikana, Nkonyeni High, and Dance Through Me. He also wrote the short film Garden of Gethsmane for Roar-Shorts.

In 2014, he played the role "Zweli Ntshangase", in the second season of the Mzansi Magic soap opera isibaya. The role became very popular among the public, where he continued to play the role until fifth season in 2017. In 2014, he was nominated for the Hunk of the Year Award at the Feather Awards 2014 for the role "Zweli". Then in 2015, he was again nominated for the Outstanding Newcomer Award at the 2015 Royalty Soapie Awards for the same role. In the meantime, he appeared in the e.tv miniseries The Book of Negroes with the role Mamadu.

In 2018, he performed in the play King Kong in King Kong - The Musical and later nominated for the Best Lead Performance Award in a Musical (male)at the Naledi Theatre Awards. Then in 2019, he played the role "Pastor Siyabonga" in the SABC1 drama serial Makoti. In March 2019, he acted in the romantic feature film Love Lives Here directed by Norman Maake. In the same year, he made his final appearance by playing the lead role of "King Nebuchadnezzar" in the theatre musical play Daniel: The Musical at the Jerusalem Theatre.

== Filmography ==
Year	Film	Role	Genre	Ref.
2020	Isibaya	Zweli Ngubane	TV series	
2015	The Book of Negroes	Mamadu	TV mini series	
2019	Makoti	Siyabonga	TV series	
2019	The Letter Reader	Menzi	Short film	
2019	Love Lives Here	Kwena Mthiyane	Film	
