= Enhle Mbali Mlotshwa =

South African actress, TV presenter, and fashion designer

- Born: March 3, 1988 (age 38); Johannesburg, South Africa
- Other name: Enhle Mbali
- Occupations: Actress; Television presenter; International award-winning fashion designer; Businesswoman; Philanthropist
- Years active: 2004–present
- Spouse: Black Coffee (m. 2011; sep. 2019)
- Children: 2
- Website: simplyenhle.com

Enhle Mbali Mlotshwa (born 3 March 1988) is a South African actress, TV presenter, philanthropist and fashion designer. She is known for her role on the South African Television Series, Tshisa. She launched a maternity wear range in South Africa and New York in 2015, and then her own luxury fashion brand in 2019 "Essie Apparel", also known as "House of Essie". The brand has been featured on Vogue Italia 2020 and took home the best designer collection accolade at Fashion Community Week in 2020 in San Francisco. It has been featured in several South African Fashion Weeks. Mlotshwa appears in Mzansi Magic's TV series, How to Manifest a Man, Netflix series Blood Legacy and Pound 4 Pound on BET Africa.

== Career ==
Mlotshwa landed her first role on the South African series Mtunzini.com which aired on the South African National Broadcasting Corporation from 2006 - 2009. Her breakthrough role was on the South African television series, Tshisa. Mlotshwa has since been cast on numerous South African television soapies and drama series including the telenovela iNkaba, Moferefere Lenyalong, Soul City, Sokhulu and Partners, Rhythm City, Rockville, and 7de Laan.

In 2009, Mlotshwa hosted the Channel O series, Young, Gifted and Black and then went on to host ANN7’s, Starbiz which focused on local and international entertainment news. She was a speaker at the Dstv In Good Company Experience which hosted American actress and writer Issa Rae in 2018.

In 2018, she was cast as the lead actress for the short film Lace. The film won Best Film, Audience Favorite, Best Actor, Best Writing, Best Directing, and Best Special Effects for the 48 Hour Film Project in Johannesburg. The film went on to compete at Filmapalooza 2019 in Orlando, Florida earning Mlotshwa an international Best Actress Award.

In 2019, Mlotshwa was cast as supporting lead for the series The Herd. She then starred in Showmax series

== Controversies ==
Enhle Mbali catches fire after using the K-word to describe her hair texture.

== Filmography ==
Television Roles
Year	Title	Role	Channel	Notes
2005	Scandal!	Azania	eTV	Season 1
2006 - 2012	Tshisa	Precious Ledwaba	SABC1	Season 1 - 3
2009 - 2010	Soul City	Lulu	SABC1	Season 9 - 10
2010	4Play: Sex Tips for Girls	Amira Mokoena	eTV	Season 1 - 2, Main Cast
2012	iNkaba	Celebrity Client	Mzansi Magic	
2012	Moferefere Lenyalong	Goldie Sekete	SABC2	
2012	Those Who Can't	Cecilia	SABC3	Season 1
2013 - 2021	Rockville	Lindi Mabaso	Mzansi Magic	Season 1 - 5
2015	The SAFTA's	Presenter	SABC2, Mzansi Magic	Season 9
2016	7 de laan	Nandi	Sabc 2	Season 16
2017	Broken Vows	Azania	eTV	
2017	Zaziwa	As herself	SABC1	Season 5
2018	Project Runway: South Africa - Season 1	Guest Judge	Mzansi Magic	
2019	The Herd	Ayanda	Mzansi Magic	Season 2
2019	Uhambo	Zoleka	Showmax	
2020	Isibaya	Sizakele	Mzansi Magic	Season 8
2020	Loving Thokoza	Charlotte Grootboom	Showmax	
2020	Queen Sono	Nova	Netflix	Season 1
2021	Safe Bet	Pearl	Showmax	
2022	Good men	Betty	SABC 1	Season 1
2022	Four Walls	Grace Molotsi	Weldun Media	
2022	Blood Psalms	Umna	Showmax	Season 1
2023	How To Manifest A Man	Duduzile Ngonyama	1 magic	Season 1
2023	Homewrecker	Tamara Oliphant	Netflix	
2023	Queenstown Kings	Xoliswa Gigaba	Netflix	
2024	How To Manifest a Man	Duduzile Ngonyama	Mzansi Magic	Season 2
2024	Blood Legacy	Gabisile Ndlovu	Netflix	Season 1
2024	Pound 4 Pound	Lindiwe Mkhwanazi	BET Africa	Season 1

== Business and ventures ==
Mlotshwa launched the maternity wear range SE Preggoz in South Africa and New York in 2015. Owns Fashion House "Essie Apparel"

== Philanthropy ==
In 2018, Mlotshwa established the Enhle Cares Foundation during the inaugural Forever Young Gala Dinner, an event held in partnership with the House of Mandela Family Foundation and Africa Rising, with backing from Global Citizen. The Foundation has expanded into the We Care Foundation, is focused on supporting girls and young women in underserved communities. One of its key initiatives involves providing respite activities for girls who serve as primary caregivers to family members affected by HIV/AIDS, disability, or aging. The foundation also prioritizes addressing issues related to sexism.

== Personal life ==
In 2011, Mlotshwa became engaged to Black Coffee a South African DJ, Mlotshwa and Nkosinathi divorced in July 2019. In 2022 Mlotshwa was in a relationship with a businessman from Mamafubedu in Free State by the name of Peter Sibiloane.
