= Thembi Nyandeni =

South African actress

Thembi Nyandeni (born 19 March 1953) is a South African actress known for her work in film, television, and theatre.
