= Amanda du-Pont =

Swazi-born South African actress, model, businesswoman

- Born: Amanda du-Pont; 26 June 1988 (age 38); Manzini, Swaziland
- Education: Uplands College; New York Film Academy
- Occupations: Actress; brand ambassador; model; MC; television host; businesswoman
- Years active: 2006–present
- Height: 159 cm (5 ft 3 in)
- Spouse: Shawn Rodriques (m. 2020; div. 2023)

Amanda du-Pont (born 26 June 1988) is a Swazi-born South African actress, model and television host. Du-Pont is known for her portrayal of Senna in the CW drama series Life is Wild and Sharon in the SABC 3 comedy-drama Taryn & Sharon. Currently, she stars as Ashley in the Netflix thriller series Shadow. She is known for acting on the SABC 1 soap opera Skeem Saam as Nompumelelo 'Lelo' Mthiyane.

== Early life ==
Du-Pont was born on 26 June 1988 in Manzini, Swaziland. She is of French, Italian, Portuguese and Swazi ancestry. She was born and raised in Manzini and lived with her cousin Alulutho Du Pont, also Swati. Later they moved to Mpumalanga to finish their schooling at Uplands College.

== Career ==
Du-Pont had a leading role in the 2014 feature film Between Friends, and a recurring role in the hit South African television program Skeem Saam. From 2012 to 2016 she was the co-host of SABC 1 celebrity lifestyle magazine shows Real Goboza, alongside Phat Joe. She has starred in the CW drama Life is Wild, SABC 2's Muvhango, Intersexions, Generations, Mzanzi TV's Loxion Bioscopeseries, and the 2015 feature film Hear Me Move. In February 2019, it was announced that Du-Pont would star in the Netflix thriller series Shadow.

== Education ==
In 2011, Du-Pont was awarded a Bachelor of Arts degree from the South African School of Motion Picture and Live Performance in Johannesburg. The next year, she graduated from the New York Film Academy in New York City, where she was awarded a full scholarship for scholastic excellence.

== Awards ==
At the age of 21, Du-Pont was awarded a Lifetime Achievement award by Swaziland's Department of Arts & Culture for her early achievements in film and television and her promotion of the Swazi language and culture.

== Personal life ==
Amanda married Shawn Rodriques in 2020. The couple divorced in January 2023.

== Other ventures ==
In April 2020, Du-Pont launched her skincare brand lelive. The name was inspired by Du-Pont's unofficial Swazi name, and means 'of the nation or world'.

== Filmography ==
Year	Title	Role	Notes
2008	Life is Wild	Senna	Episode: "P.O.C."
2012	Loksion Bioskop:Andilalanga		
2012-2016	Real Goboza		
2014–2021	Skeem Saam	Nompumelelo "Lelo" Mthiyane	Main role
2014	Task Force	Christelle	
2015	Generations: The Legacy	Herself	Special Guest
2015	Hear Me Move		
2016–present	Between Friends		
2017	10 Days In Sun City		
2017	Taryn and Sharon	Sharon	
2019	Shadow	Ashley	Main role
2019-2022	Isono	Mary's Worker	Recurring
2021	Little Big Mouth	Mel	Main role
2022	The Domestic		
