= Thulani Mtsweni =

South African actor

- Born: Thulani Mtsweni; 31 July 1968 (age 57); South Africa
- Other names: Kaka Mzozozo
- Occupation: Actor
- Years active: 2015–present
- Children: Sanele Ngcebo Mnguni, Prosperity Cattle
- Relatives: Thulisile Rhoda ka Sibiya

Thulani Mtsweni (born 31 July 1968) is a South African actor. He is best known for his roles in the popular series Isidingo, Isibaya and iNumber Number.

== Career ==
At first, he worked with several student producers to get some exposure in drama due to a struggling pathway towards South African drama. His most notable television acting came through the role as 'Shadrack Bhekiziswe Sibiya' in the popular serial Isidingo. In 2017, he appeared in the television series iNumber Number and played the role 'Nyoka'. He also casts as an abducted boy on Rhythm City. Then he joined the cast of the serial Gomora and quit after two years. In 2020, he joined the cast of another popular telenovela Isibaya and currently playing the role 'Mpihlangene Zungu', younger brother of Mpiyakhe Zungu.
