= Charles Bouguenon =

South African actor (born 1983)

- Born: Charles Bouguenon; 30 June 1983 (age 42); South Africa
- Other names: Charlie Bouguenon
- Occupation: Actor
- Years active: 2004–present
- Height: 1.85 m (6 ft 1 in)

Charles "Charlie" Bouguenon (born 30 June 1983) is a South African actor. He is best known for his roles in the popular international television serials and films Bloodshot, Transformers: The Last Knight and Homeland.

== Personal life ==
He was born on 30 June 1983 in South Africa. His father and grandfather were classical musicians.

== Career ==
Charles began performing at an early age where he started with violin and music theory at the age of four. However, he later continued to move towards acting. During school period, he was very active in dramatic societies with performances in stage. He later studied drama at the University of Pretoria, and completed a teacher's diploma in Latin American and Ballroom dance, as well as a certificate in Stage Combat.

In 2008, he appeared in the television serial Scandal! and also starred in several popular serials such as Jozi Streets, and Egoli. However, he is best known for his recurring role as Coco's boyfriend 'Brad' in the 2011 television sitcom It's for Life. In 2011, he played the role of 'Jimmy Meyer' in the television soap opera 7de Laan as well as in the soapie Binneland also the SABC 3 soapie, The Estate.

He also performed in theatre plays such as Fame: the musical, Janice Honeyman's Cinderella Pantomime, Ladies Night, Antony & Cleopatra, Now That's Tap, Thoroughly Modern Millie, Buddy: the Buddy Holly Story, The King & I, Houtkruis: Die Musical and The Rocky Horror Picture Show.

== Filmography ==
Year	Film	Role	Genre	Ref.
2004	Jozi Streets	Rory	TV series	
2007	7de Laan	Jimmy Meyer	TV series	
2008	Binneland		TV series	
2009	Scandal!	Timothy	TV series	
2011	It's for Life	Brad	TV series	
2012	Angus Buchan's Ordinary People	Xavier	Film	
2013	Koringberg	Dave Arthur	Film	
2014	Homeland	Captain Fox	TV series	
2015	Getroud met rugby	Speursersant Du Plooy	TV series	
2015	Bloedbroers	Petrus Marais	TV series	
2015	Land of Milk & Money	Stanislav Balsak	Film	
2015	Trouvoete	Chris	Film	
2016	Mignon Mossie van Wyk	Coach	Film	
2016	Skorokoro	Assupol Member	Film	
2016	Sterlopers	Joe de Villiers	TV series	
2016	The Journey Is the Destination	Dayril	Film	
2017	Kampterrein	Cedric	Film	
2017	Swartwater	Wolf	TV series	
2017	Transformers: The Last Knight	Namibian Scientist	Film	
2017	Elke Skewe Pot	Neels	TV series	
2017	Vuil Wasgoed	Joe Gotty	Film	
2017	Erfsondes	Hugo	TV series	
2018	Die Kasteel	Nico Gryffenbach	TV series	
2018	Thys & Trix	Stephán	Film	
2019	The Last Victims	Young Warren	Film	
2019	Aya	Mika	Film	
2019	Red Room	Dimitrov Kuryalenko	Film	
2019	The Story of Racheltjie De Beer	Kingsley	Film	
2019	Posbus 1	Willem	TV movie	
2019	Chin Up!	Jordan	TV series	
2020	Bloodshot	Merc Leader	Film	
2020	Blouwyn	Pieter Klaas	Film	
2020	Professionals	Inspector Patric	TV series	
2021	Little Big Mouth	Ceddie		
2023	Warrior	Lukas	TV series	
TBD	Amandla	Drill Sergeant	Film	
TBD	Alexia	Donald	Film	
