= Isibaya =

South African television drama series

- The show's title card, shown at the end of the intro of every episode.
- Genre: Drama
- Created by: Angus Gibson; Desiree Markgraaff; Teboho Mahlatsi; Catherine Stewart
- Written by: Andries Mahlatse Banda; Adze Ugah; Desiree Markgraaf; Mpumelelo Paul Grootboom; Steven Pillemer; Rorisang Matuba; Chris Q. Radebe; Zolisa Sigwada; Christian Bloomkamp
- Directed by: Desiree Markgraaff
- Starring: Siyabonga Thwala; Bheki Mkhwane; Thembi Nyandeni; Bongani Gumede; Sdumo Mtshali; Nomzamo Mbatha; Ayanda Borotho; Celeste Ntuli; Mampho Brescia; Pallance Dladla; Jessica Nkosi; Andile Mxakaza; Muzi Mthabela; Gcina Mkhize; Zakhele Mabasa; Lorraine Mphephi; Mdu Gumede; Melusi Mbele; Vusi Kunene; Andile Gumbi; Zinhle Mabena; Samson Khumalo; Lerato Mvelase; Florence Mokgatsi; Zakhele Msibi; Senzo Vilakazi; Menzi Ngubane; Thuli Thabethe; Adbul Khoza; Linda Mtoba; Linda Sebezo; Sayitsheni Mdhaki; Amina Jack; Nkanyiso Mzimela; Samukele Mkhize; Ernest Ndlovu; Sibonile Ngubane; Nhlanhla Mdlalose; Dumisani Dlamini; Nandi Nyembe; Thandeka Qwabe; Asavela Mnqithi; Enhle Mbali Mlotshwa; Hamilton Dlamini; Aubrey Poo; Sihle Ndaba; Chris Q Radebe; Koketso Mophuting; Londeka Mchunu; Sibusisiwe Jili; Thulani Mtshweni; Tisetso Thoka; Charles Phasha
- Country of origin: South Africa
- Original language: Multilingual (Subtitles included)
- No. of seasons: 8
- No. of episodes: 2,028

Production
- Executive producer: Desiree Markgraaff
- Producer: Eva Franzen
- Camera setup: Multi-cameras
- Running time: 22 - 24 minutes
- Production company: The Bomb Shelter

Original release
- Network: Mzansi Magic
- Release: 18 March 2013 – 2 April 2021

Isibaya is a South African television drama series that ran for eight seasons from 18 March 2013 to 2 April 2021 on Mzansi Magic. The show was created by Angus Gibson, Desiree Markgraaff, Teboho Mahlatsi, Catherine Stewart and Benedict Carton. Actors that have starred in the series over the years include Siyabonga Thwala, Thembi Nyandeni, Nomzamo Mbatha, Celeste Ntuli, Mampho Brescia, Bheki Mkhwane, Pallance Dladla, and Sdumo Mtshali. On 22 September 2025, Mzansi Magic began rerunning the series following a viewer poll on which shows should return, in which Isibaya ranked first.

== Premise ==
The drama revolves around two powerful taxi business families in Bhubesini: the Zungus, headed by Mpiyakhe Zungu, and the Ndlovu family, led by Samson Ndlovu. Their rivalries and daily struggles are further complicated when their children—Thandeka Zungu and S'busiso Ndlovu—marry, briefly uniting the families.

A new threat emerges with the arrival of Judas Ngwenya, his wife Beauty, their children Zama and Qaphela, and Beauty’s stepson. While Judas works for Mpiyakhe Zungu, he secretly schemes against the family. The extended household also includes Beauty’s mother, Lillian Nyandeni, her eventual husband and Judas’s ally, Saddam Xaba, and Judas’s nephew, Jerry Nyandeni. Ultimately, the cycle of betrayal and violence culminates when Judas is killed by his own son, Qaphela (season 7).

== Cast ==
Actor	Role
Siyabonga Thwala	Mpiyakhe Zungu
Thembi Nyandeni	Mkabayi Zungu
Bheki Mkhwane	Samson Ndlovu
Sdumo Mtshali	S'busiso Ndlovu
Nomzamo Mbatha	Thandeka Zungu - Ndlovu Madlovu
Enhle Mbali Mlotshwa	Sizakele Sibiya
Bongani Gumede	Mandlenkosi Ndlovu
Ayanda Borotho	Phumelele Dlamini - Zungu
Celeste Ntuli	Siphokazi Mthembu - Zungu
Pallance Dladla	Jabulani Zungu
Mampho Brescia	Iris Rasebetse
Mdu Gumede	Ntandane
Abdul Khoza	Qaphela Ngwenya
Andile Maxakaza	Fezile Khumalo
Zakhele Mabasa	S'khaleni Mngomezulu
Gcina Mkhize	Khanyisile Majola- Ndlovu
Asavela Mngqithi	Ntwenhle Ndlovu - Ngubane
Lerato Mvelase	Sibongile Mkhize - Zungu
Aubrey Poo	Fenyang Molefenyane
Zinhle Mabena	Sihle Ngubane
Samukele Mkhize	Mabuyi Dlamini
Linda Sebezo	Lillian Nyandeni - Xaba
Lorraine Mphephi	Pamela Mngomezulu

Recurring cast members include

- Wanda Zuma - Detective Mtho
- Dumisani Dlamini - Mbodla
- Hamilton Dlamini - Andile Sibiya
- Wendy Gumede - Nolwandle
- Amina Jack - Thokozani Zungu
- Thulasizwe Khubheka - Mduduzi
- Melusi Mbele - Bhekumuzi
- Londeka Mchunu - Londiwe Ngubane
- Siyatsheni Mdakhi - Saddam Xaba
- Nhlanhla Mdlalose - Bongani
- Zakhele Msibi - Sunday Nkabinde
- Thulani Mtsweni - Mpihlangene Zungu
- Nkanyiso Mzimela - Melusi Zungu
- Sihle Ndaba - Cebisile Mkhize
- Enerst Ndlovu - Ngwebedla
- Sibonelo Ngubane - Mbovu
- Charles Phasha - Jerry
- Chris Q. Radebe - Dabula Ngubane
- Thandeka Qwabe - Thandiwe
- Tisetso Thoka - Mickey Sibiya

== Cast shown on opening scene ==
Season 1

- Siyabonga Thwala as Mpiyakhe Zungu
- Thembi Nyandeni as Mkabayi Zungu
- Bheki Mkhwane as Samson Ndlovu
- Nomzamo Mbatha as Thandeka Zungu
- S'dumo Mtshali as S'busiso Ndlovu
- Bongani Gumede as Mandlenkosi Ndlovu
- Tshepo Baikai as Tshepo Zungu

Season 2

- Siyabonga Thwala as Mpiyakhe Zungu
- Thembi Nyandeni as Mkabayi Zungu
- Bheki Mkhwane as Samson Ndlovu
- Nomzamo Mbatha as Thandeka Zungu
- S'dumo Mtshali as Sibusiso Ndlovu
- Bongani Gumede as Mandlenkosi Zungu
- Menzi Ngubane as Judas Ngwenya
- Abdul Khoza as Qaphela Ngwenya
- Ayanda Borotho as Phumelele Zungu
- Celeste Ntuli as Siphokazi Zungu
- Jessica Nkosi as Qondisile Buthelezi-Shezi
- Vusi Kunene as Bhekifa Shezi
- Mampho Brescia as Iris Rasebetse - Zungu
- Pallance Dladla as Jabulani Zungu
- Muzi Mthabela as Duma Ngema
- Andile Maxakaza as Fezile Khumalo
- Zakhele Mabasa as Skhaleni Mngomezulu
- Mdu Gumede as Ntandane
- Thuli Thabethe as Beauty Ngwenya
- Linda Sebezo as Lillian Nyandeni
- Samson Khumalo as Kgokong
- Lorraine Mphephi as Pamela Mngomezulu
- Linda Mtoba as Zama Nyandeni

Season 3

- Siyabonga Thwala as Mpiyakhe Zungu
- Thembi Nyandeni as Mkabayi Zungu
- Bheki Mkhwane as Samson Ndlovu
- Nomzamo Mbatha as Thandeka Zungu - Ndlovu
- S'dumo Mtshali as Sibusiso Ndlovu
- Bongani Gumede as Mandlenkosi Ndlovu
- Menzi Ngubane as Judas Ngwenya
- Abdul Khoza as Qaphela Ngwenya
- Ayanda Borotho as Phumelele Zungu
- Celeste Ntuli as Siphokazi Zungu
- Jessica Nkosi as Qondisile Buthelezi - Shezi
- Vusi Kunene as Bhekifa Shezi
- Mampho Brescia as Iris Rasebetse
- Andile Mxakaza as Fezile Khumalo
- Zakhele Mabasa as S'khaleni Mngomezulu
- Mdu Gumede as Ntandane
- Thuli Thabethe as Beauty Ngwenya

Season 4

- Siyabonga Thwala as Mpiyakhe Zungu
- Thembi Nyandeni as Mkabayi Zungu
- Bheki Mkhwane as Samson Ndlovu
- Nomzamo Mbatha as Thandeka Zungu - Ndlovu
- S'dumo Mtshali as S'busiso Ndlovu
- Bongani Gumede as Mandlenkosi Ndlovu
- Menzi Ngubane as Judas Ngwenya
- Abdul Khoza as Qaphela Ngwenya
- Ayanda Borotho as Phumelele Zungu
- Celeste Ntuli as Siphokazi Zungu
- Jessica Nkosi as Qondisile Buthelezi - Shezi
- Vusi Kunene as Bhekifa Shezi
- Mampho Brescia as Iris Rasebetse
- Andile Mxakaza as Fezile Khumalo
- Zakhele Mabasa as S'khaleni Mngomezulu
- Mdu Gumede as Ntandane
- Thuli Thabethe as Beauty Ngwenya
- Linda Sebezo as Lillian Nyandeni
- Samson Khumalo as Kgokong
- Lorraine Mphephi as Pamela Mngomezulu

Season 5

Season 6

Season 7

- Siyabonga Thwala as Mpiyakhe Zungu
- Thembi Nyandeni as Mkabayi Zungu
- Bheki Mkhwane as Samson Ndlovu
- Nomzamo Mbatha as Thandeka Zungu
- S'dumo Mtshali as Sibusiso Ndlovu
- Bongani Gumede

Season 8

- Siyabonga Thwala as Mpiyakhe Zungu
- Thembi Nyandeni as Mkabayi Zungu
- Bheki Mkhwane as Samson Ndlovu
- S'dumo Mtshali as Sibusiso Ndlovu
- Bongani Gumede as Mandlenkosi Ndlovu
- Enhle Mbali Mlotshwa as Sizakele Sibiya
- Ayanda Borotho as Phumelele Dlamini
- Celeste Ntuli as Siphokazi Zungu
- Mampho Brescia as Iris Rasebetse
- Andile Mxakaza as Fezile Khumalo
- Zakhele Mabasa as S'khaleni Mngomezulu
- Mdu Gumede as Ntandane
- Gcina Mkhize as Khanyisile Ndlovu
- Asavela Mngqithi as Ntwenthle Ndlovu - Ngubane
- Lerato Mvelase as Sibongile Mkhize - Zungu
- Aubrey Poo as Fenyang Molefenyane
- Chris Q Radebe as Dabula Ngubane
- Zinhle Mabena as Sihle Ngubane
- Samukele Mkhize as Mabuyi Dlamini
- Amina Jack as Thokozani Zungu
- Sibonile Ngubane as Mbovu
- Siyatsheni Mdakhi as Sadam Xaba
- Nkanyiso Mzimela as Melusi Zungu
- Londeka Mchunu as Londiwe Ngubane

== Former cast members ==
- Vusi Kunene as Bhekifa Shezi
- Nomzamo Mbatha as Thandeka Zungu - Ndlovu
- Menzi Ngubane as Judas Ngwenya
- Muzi Mthabela as Duma Ngema
- Tamara Jozi as Mazondi
- Andile Gumbi as Zweli Shezi
- Jessica Nkosi as Qondisile Buthelezi
- Thuli Thabethe as Beauty Nyandeni - Ngwenya
- Linda Mtoba as Zama Nyandeni
- Sibusisiwe Jili as Zanele
- Tumisho Masha as Jackson
- Senzo Vilakazi as Mehlomamba
- Florence Makgatsi as Lerato
- Samson Khumalo as Kgokong
- Koketso Mophuthing as Kaone
- Kamogelo Mampe as Nurse Ditsele
