= Shadow (TV series) =

South African television series

- Genre: Thriller; Crime drama; Action
- Created by: Phillip Wolmarans; Nick Keulemans; Fred Wolmarans; Gareth Crocker
- Starring: Pallance Dladla; Amanda Du-Pont; Khathu Ramabulana; Tumie Ngumla
- Country of origin: South Africa
- Original language: English
- No. of seasons: 1
- No. of episodes: 8

Production
- Executive producers: Chris Lawrance; Colleen Lawrance
- Camera setup: Single-camera
- Running time: 40–49 min
- Production company: Motion Story Productions

Original release
- Network: Netflix
- Release: March 8, 2019

Shadow is a South African thriller television series that premiered on March 8, 2019, on Netflix. It is the first original South African series to stream on Netflix. (Note: Queen Sono was the first South African series commissioned by Netflix, but Shadow streamed first on the service since Queen Sono later premiered on February 28, 2020.)

== Synopsis ==
Shadow follows the story of an ex-cop suffering from congenital analgesia, while taking vigilante justice into his own hands in the criminal underworld of Johannesburg.

== Cast and characters ==
=== Main ===
- Pallance Dladla as Shadrach "Shadow" Khumalo
- Amanda Du-Pont as Ashley
- Khathu Ramabulana as Max
- Tumie Ngumla as Zola

=== Recurring ===
- Nnekwa Tsajwa as Mandla
- Lunathi Mampofu as Mary
- Phila Mazibuko as Reggie
- Altovise Lawrence as Abbey
- Julian Kruger as Frank
- Themsie Times as Mrs. Maleka
- Bhekisizwe Mahlawe as James
- Arno Botes as Benjamin
- Jude Okeke as Arnold
- Mamarumo Marokane as Janice
- Shadi Chauke as Lola
- Mohau Sonny as Gigi
- Phoenix Baaitse as Paka
- Christiaan Cronje as Arthur
- Kaylin Reed as Young Shadow
- Didimalang Moagi as Ayanda
- Zekhetehelo Zondi as Zinhle

== Production ==
=== Casting ===
Sometime after the series was acquired by Netflix, it was confirmed that Pallance Dladla and Amanda Du-Pont had been cast as series regulars.

== Episodes ==
No.	Title	Directed by	Written by	Original release date
1	"Mary's Blackmail"	Gareth Crocker & Fred Wolmarans	Gareth Crocker	March 8, 2019
2	"Snow Globe Killer"	Gareth Crocker & Fred Wolmarans	Gareth Crocker	March 8, 2019
3	"Ashley's Secret"	Gareth Crocker & Fred Wolmarans	Gareth Crocker	March 8, 2019
4	"Man Down"	Gareth Crocker & Fred Wolmarans	Gareth Crocker	March 8, 2019
5	"Ghost Killer"	Gareth Crocker & Fred Wolmarans	Gareth Crocker	March 8, 2019
6	"Dare to Die"	Gareth Crocker & Fred Wolmarans	Gareth Crocker	March 8, 2019
7	"There's Something in the House"	Gareth Crocker & Fred Wolmarans	Gareth Crocker	March 8, 2019
8	"The Reckoning"	Gareth Crocker & Fred Wolmarans	Gareth Crocker	March 8, 2019

== Release ==
On February 18, 2019, the official trailer for the series was released.
