= S'dumo Mtshali =

South African actor

- Born: 3 March 1983 (age 43); Durban, KwaZulu-Natal, South Africa
- Education: Durban University of Technology (Diploma in Drama)
- Occupations: Actor; Director; Producer
- Years active: 2010–present

S'dumo Mtshali, also spelled Sdumo, (born 3 March 1983) is a South African actor, producer, and director. Mtshali first gained recognition as a winner on the inaugural season of Amstel Class Act.

== Career ==
Mtshali won the inaugural season of the SABC 1 reality competition Amstel Class Act in 2010. As part of his prize, he spent eight weeks training at the New York Film Academy and received professional representation from Moonyeen Lee and Associates (MLA).

His first leading role was in the HIV/AIDS drama Intersexions, in which he portrayed DJ Mo. In 2011, he appeared in e.tv’s soapie Rhythm City as Maidi Kotwe. He later starred as the lead character, Chili Ngcobo, in iNumber Number, a film directed by Class Act creator Donovan Marsh.

In 2013, S'dumo joined the cast of Isibaya, replacing Treasure Blose in the role of Sibusiso Ndlovu, a performance that earned him his first South African Film and Television Awards (SAFTA) nomination. At the 2019 SAFTAs, he won the award for Best Supporting Actor in a TV Drama for his portrayal of Mandla in Is'Thunzi.

== Filmography ==
Film

Year	Title	Role	Ref
2011	Inside Story	Sphikiri	
2013	iNumber Number	Chili Ngcobo	
2023	iNumber Number: Jozi Gold	Chili Ngcobo	

Television

Year	Title	Role	Ref
2010	Intersexions	DJ Mo Freek	
2011	Rhythm City	Maidi Kotwe	
2012	Tempy Pushas	Kuti Daniels	
2013	Isibaya	Sibusiso Ndlovu	
2016	Is'Thunzi	Mandla	
2023–2025	My Brothers Keeper	Donga Shabalala	
2025	Marked	Tebza Nyembezi	
2026	The Polygamist	Jonasi Gomora	

== Awards ==
Award	Year	Category	Nominated work	Result	Ref
South African Film and Television Awards	2014	Best Actor in TV Soap	Isibaya	Nominated	
South African Film and Television Awards	2015	Best Actor in Film	iNumber Number	Nominated	
South African Film and Television Awards	2016	Best Actor in TV Drama	Saints & Sinners	Nominated	
South African Film and Television Awards	2018	Best Actor in TV Drama	Is'Thunzi	Nominated	
South African Film and Television Awards	2019	Best Actor in TV Soap	Isibaya	Nominated	
South African Film and Television Awards	2019	Best Supporting Actor in TV Drama	Is'Thunzi	Won	
South African Film and Television Awards	2024	Best Actor in Fim	iNumber Number: Jozi Gold	Nominated	

== Personal life ==
Mtshali is from Montclaire, Durban and holds a Diploma in Drama from the Durban University of Technology.
