= Lwazi Mthembu =

South African actress and singer

- Born: Lwazilubanzi Mthembu; 11 June 1991 (age 35); South Africa
- Education: Sacred Heart College; University of the Witwatersrand
- Occupations: Actress; dancer; singer
- Years active: 2013–present
- Height: 1.57 m (5 ft 2 in)

Lwazilubanzi Mthembu (born 11 July 1991), popularly known as Lwazi Mthembu, is a South African actress, dancer and singer. She is best known for the roles in the television serials Thandeka's Diary, Broken Vows and House of Zwide.

== Personal life ==
Mthembu was born on 11 July 1991 in South Africa. She completed high school at the Sacred Heart College. In 2010, she enrolled to a BA degree in Performing Arts at the University of the Witwatersrand where she graduated in 2013.

== Career ==
During her university life, she performed in many theatre plays such as; Aqua Mine directed by Gys de Villiers, Once Upon a Life at the Wits Theatre and By the Apricot Trees directed by Ntsako Mkhabela for the Grahamstown Festival of the Arts. In 2013, she made her television debut with the SABC1 anthology drama serial Intersexions, where she played a supportive role of "nurse". After graduation, he joined with the fifth season of the e.tv anthology series eKasi: Our Stories and the played the role of "Lala". Then in 2014, she made a guest role in the e.tv romantic comedy-drama serial Mzansi Love.

In 2015, she played the lead role of "Sihle" in the SABC1 television sitcom Thandeka's diary. The role became very popular where she played the role in three seasons until 2019. In 2016, she was invited to play the role "Nurse" in final episodes of the Mzansi Magic soap opera Zabalaza. In 2021, she joined with the cast of television serial House of Zwide with the role "Nomsa".

Apart from acting, she is also a singer and is the vocalist for the band "About That Life".

== Filmography ==
Year	Film	Role	Genre	Ref.
2013	Intersexions	Nurse	TV series	
2013	Mzansi Love	Madam Saskia	TV series	
2013	eKasi: Our Stories	Lala	TV series	
2015	Thandeka's Diary	Sihle	TV series	
2015	Zabalaza	Nurse	TV series	
2017	Broken Vows	Mayibuye	TV series	
2018	Guilt	Zizipho Mokoena	TV series	
2018	Ingozi	Celebrity 1	TV series	
2018	Lockdown	Natasha	TV series	
2019	Ifalakhe	Zinkanyezi	TV series	
2021	House of Zwide	Nomsa	TV series	
