= Shaka iLembe =

South African television series

- Genre: Historical Drama
- Created by: Angus Gibson; Desiree Markgraaff; Teboho Mahlatsi; Catherine Stewart; Nhlanhla Mtaka; Andy Petersen; Benedict Carton
- Based on: King Shaka
- Written by: Daniel Zimbler; Andy Petersen; Jacob Ntshangase; Desiree Markgraaff; Mpumelelo Paul Grootboom; Steven Pillemar; Benedict Carton; Angus Gibson
- Directed by: Angus Gibson; Zeno Petersen; Adze Ugah
- Creative director: Angus Gibson
- Starring: Nomzamo Mbatha; Lemogang Tsipa; Senzo Radebe; Thembinkosi Mthembu; Dawn Thandeka King; Wiseman Mncube; Khabonina Qubeka; Sthandiwe Kgoroge; Luyanda Zuma; Wanda Zuma; Ayanda Borotho; Ntando Duma; Baby Cele; Zamani Mbatha; Mduduzi Mabaso; Sive Mabuya; Sjava; Mondli Makhoba; Amanda Seome; Nkanyiso Mzimela; Thandolwethu Zondi; Anele Nene; Sikhanyiso Sithole; Melusi Mbele; Vuyolwethu Biyela; Khanyisani Kheswa; Fanele Zulu
- Theme music composer: Philip Miller
- Country of origin: South Africa
- Original language: Zulu
- No. of seasons: 2
- No. of episodes: 24

Production
- Executive producers: Desiree Markgraaff; Nomzamo Mbatha; Angus Gibson
- Producers: Desiree Markgraaff; Maqubool Mahomed
- Cinematography: Zeno Petersen
- Editor: LJ Rice
- Camera setup: Multi-cameras
- Running time: 55 - 58 minutes
- Production company: The Bomb Shelter

Original release
- Network: Mzansi Magic
- Release: 18 June 2023 – present

Shaka iLembe is a South African television drama series produced by The Bomb Shelter for M-Net's channel, Mzansi Magic, a Multichoice company. The series retells the story of King Shaka of the Zulu Kingdom and his quest to fight for his throne, and it's the most expensive show in South Africa to date. It stars Lemogang Tsipa as Shaka kaSenzangakhona, Nomzamo Mbatha as Queen Nandi and Senzo Radebe, as King Senzangakhona kaJama.

The series premiered on 18, June 2023, recording 3.6 million viewers in its first week, which are the highest ratings ever for a Multichoice-produced drama series.

In September 2024, Shaka Ilembe became the most nominated drama series in SAFTA history, with 17 nominations. At the 18th SAFTA ceremony held in October 2024, the series became the most-awarded series with 12 awards, including Best TV Drama. Multichoice's SAFTA accolades increased to a total of 46 awards.

Season 2 of the series premiered on June 15, 2025 and picks up with Shaka and Nandi arriving at KwaNobamba, where he begins his reign as the new Zulu king.

== Cast ==
=== Main ===
- Nomzamo Mbatha as Nandi (Season 1 - present)
- Lemogang Tsipa as Shaka kaSenzangakhona (Season 1 - present)
  - Ntando Zondi as Young Shaka (Season 1)
- Thembinkosi Mthembu as Dingiswayo (Season 1 - 2)
- Dawn Thandeka King as Mkabayi kaJama / Narrator (Season 1 - present)
- Wiseman Mncube as Zwide kaLanga (Season 1 - present)
- Khabonina Qubeka as Queen Ntombazi (Season 1 - 2)
- Amanda Seome as Ntombazana KaZwide (Season 2 - present)
- Zamani Mbatha as Nomhlanjana KaZwide (Season 2)
- Anele Nene as Sikhunyana KaZwide (Season 2 - present)
- Nkanyiso Mzimela as Somveli kaDingiswayo (Season 1 - 2)
- Calvin Ratladi as Goloza (Season 1 - 2)
- Luyanda Zuma as Liyana (Season 2)
- Wanda Zuma as Mawewe (Season 1 - 2)
- Melusi Mbele as Nongila kaMabaso (Season 2 - present)
- Senzo Radebe as Senzangakhona kaJama (Season 1 - 2;guest)
- Sthandiwe Kgoroge as Queen Mthaniya KaSibiya (Season 1 - present)
- Baby Cele as Queen Mbhamba (Season 1 - present)
- Ernest Ndlovu as Jama kaNdaba (Season 1)
- Hamilton Dhlamini as King Jobe ka Nyambose (Season 1)
- Ntando Duma as Bhibhi KaSompisi (Season 1 - 2;guest)
- Hope Mbhele as Baleka (Season 1)
- Abdul Khoza as Cija (Season 1 - 2)
- Ziya Xulu as Pikile (Season 1 - 2;guest)

=== Recurring ===
- Fanele Zulu as Mgobhozi (Season 1 - present)
- Lungani Mabaso as Ngcoboka (Season 1 - present)
- Sydney Ndhlovu as Mondisa kaJobe (Season 2)
- Jabulani Mthembu as Soshangane (Season 2 - present)
- Mpilo Mbatha as Mzilikazi (Season 2 - present)
- Kwanele Mkhize as Mbopha kaSithayi (Season 2 - present)
- Phumlani Mndebele as Nyengelezi (Season 1 - 2)
- Sikhanyiso Sithole as Hletjiwe (Season 2 - present)
- Nkosana Samane as Noluju (Season 2)
- Mondli Makhoba as Ngomane (Season 1 - present)
- Andile Mxakaza as Mdlaka (Season 2 - present)
- Zazi Kunene as Nomcoba (Season 1 - present)
- Vuyolwethu Biyela as Dingane (Season 2 - present)
- Wonder Ndlovu as Mpande (Season 2 - present)
- Akhona Ndlovu as King Phakathwayo (Season 1 - 2)
- Khanyisani Kheswa as Nomo (Season 1 - 2)
- Kwanda Manyathi as Mhlangana (Season 2 - present)
- Sive Mabuya as Queen Mkabi kaNzuza (Season 1 - present)
- Thandolwethu Zondi as Nyembezi (Season 2)
- Zonke Mchunu as Queen Zenzile KaMthethwa (Season 1 - present)
- Sjava as Bhungane KaNtsele (Season 1)
- Ayanda Borotho as Queen Mafunda KaQwabe (Season 1)
- Mduduzi Mabaso as Gendeyane (Season 1)

== Production ==
=== Development ===
M-Net and Multichoice had officially announced the series in May 2018, with four years of planning prior to the announcement. Production took six years to complete, with the consultation of historians, academics and family descendants, including the late King Goodwill Zwelithini and Prince Mangosuthu Buthelezi. During this time American network Showtime, which had planned to film their version with a backing of $90 million, suddenly scrapped their production which was towards completion.

=== Filming ===
Location scouting for the series commenced in 2019, with principal filming of the series taking place in 2022 at the Greater Cradle Nature Reserve, and in the towns of Eshowe, Nkandla Forest, Port Edward, Drakensburg, Mooi River and Zulu Falls in KwaZulu-Natal, with more than 120 builders and thatchers from KwaZulu-Natal engaged in building the sets. Filmmakers had to stick to a rigid building schedule to abide by the prescribed on-site protocols in keeping with the strict rules of the nature reserve. According to crew, the sets in Johannesburg took over nine months to build.

== Broadcast ==
Before its television debut, the series had a private screening at Montecasino, Johannesburg.

The series premiered on 18 June 2023, airing weekly on Mzansi Magic. While the series was filmed in 4K, the series was aired in HD quality.

=== International broadcast ===
Episodes of the series were immediately aired after their Mzansi Magic debut across the African continent through M-Net's other local interest channels. The series was shown on Maisha Magic Plus in Kenya, Akwaaba Magic in Ghana, Africa Magic Showcase and Africa Magic Urban in Nigeria and the rest of Africa, Pearl Magic Prime in Uganda, and Zambezi Magic in Zambia. The series was later added on the relaunched streaming service Showmax.

The series is also shown in French-speaking territories, through Canal+.
