= Lindani Nkosi =

South African actor

- Born: 5 March 1968 (age 58)
- Occupation: Actor
- Notable work: Of Good Report

Lindani Nkosi (born 5 March 1968) is a South African actor. He is known for portraying Lincoln Sibeko in the soap opera Isidingo. He also portrayed Nelson Mandela in the 2004 film Drum and has been the muppeteer of Moshe the giant meerkat from the hit South African children’s show Takalani Sesame (a co-production of the American series Sesame Street) since the series debuted in 2000.

== Select filmography ==
- Generations (1993 TV Series) as Thulani
- Takalani Sesame (since 2000)
- Drum (2004) as Nelson Mandela
- A Small Town Called Descent (2010) as Jackie Mbizo
- Of Good Report (2013) as Vicktor
- Cry of Love (2016) as Julius
- Takalani Sesame (2020 TV Series) as Moshe
- The Brave Ones (2022 TV Series) as Counsellor Nkomo
- Adulting (2023 TV Series) as Vuyani's Father
