= List of programs broadcast by Mzansi Magic =

List of TV programs

This is a list of television programs currently and formerly broadcast by the satellite television channel Mzansi Magic in South Africa.

== Current Programming ==
Title	Genre	Premiere	Status
Ithonga	Crime Fantasy Telenovela	March 2025	Currently Airing Season 1
The River	Drama	October 2021	Currently Airing Season 6(Rebroadcast from 1Magic)
Inimba	Telenovela	April 2025	Currently Airing Season 1
1802: Love Defies Time	Historical drama	January 2025	Currently Airing Season 1(Rebroadcast from 1Magic)
Genesis	Musical Drama Series	April 2025	Currently Airing Season 1
Kwa Tsholo	Television comedy	April 2025	Currently Airing Season 1
Shaka ILembe	Historical drama	June 2023	Currently Airing Season 2
Izangane Ze'Sthembu	Reality show	April 2023	Currently Airing Season 2
Uthando NeSithembu: The Realnovela	Reality show	March 2011	Currently Airing Season 8
Thina Singo Zungu	Reality show	February 2025	Currently Airing Season 1
O.16 FM	TV series	June 2025	Currently Airing Season 1

- The Real Housewives of Durban

=== Reality/Documentary ===
- Thina Singo Zungu
- Cishe Ngafa
- Date My Family
- Living The Dream with Somizi
- Not a Diva
- Papa Penny Ahee
- Please Step In
- The Perfect Match
- The Ranakas
- Utatakho
- uThando Nes'Thembu
- Yimlo
- Yobe

=== Lifestyle ===
- Change Down
- Our Perfect Wedding

=== Music ===
- Massive Music
- Mzansi Magic Music Specials
- The Lounge Series

=== Comedy ===
- Mzansi Comedy Nights

=== Sports ===
- HomeGround
- WWE Raw (highlights)
- WWE SmackDown (highlights)

=== Food ===
- Celeb Feast with Zola
- Let's Eat with Siphokazi

=== Franchises ===
- Clash of the Choirs South Africa
- Big Brother Mzansi
- Project Runway South Africa

=== Acquired ===
- Being Bonang
- The Doctors
- The Talk
- Dr. Phil

== Upcoming programming ==
- Rate My Plate
- Adulting-TV Drama
- Youngins-TV Drama
- Soft Life-TV Drama

== Former programming ==
=== Soapies/Series ===
- Umkhokha: The Curse
- The River
- My Brother's Keeper
- Gqeberha: The Empire
- Greed & Desire
- Ring of Lies
- The Herd
- Lockdown
- The Throne
- Isibaya
- The Queen
- Rockville
- The Road
- The Wild
- Zabalaza
- Ya Lla
- Nkululeko
- Gomora
- Champions
- Jacob's Cross

=== Reality/Documentary ===
- Diski Divas

=== Music ===
- Icilongo
- My Top 10: My Life In Music
- Shay'Ngoma

=== Comedy ===
- Laugh Out Loud – The Comedy Show

=== Game Shows ===
- Cula Sibone
- Ka-Ching
- Kabelo's Bootcamp
- KFC Taste Kitchen
- Nguwe Na?

=== News ===
- Daily Sun TV

=== Acquired ===
- Ayeye
