= Lunathi Mampofu =

South African actress (born 1987)

- Born: 7 March 1987 (age 39); Cape Town, South Africa
- Education: AFDA; New York Film Academy
- Occupations: Actress; director
- Years active: 2009– present
- Notable work: The Queen; The River; Inimba
- Height: 1.63 m (5 ft 4 in)
- Relatives: Oros Mampofu (brother); Prince Mampofu (brother)

Lunathi Mampofu (born 7 March 1987) is a South African actress and film director. She is best known for playing lead and starring roles in Mzansi Magic telenovelas The Queen (2018–2019) as Benni, The River (2020–2023) as Emma and Inimba (2025–present) as Zoleka Bikitsha-Ngcukana

== Career ==
=== 2009–2018: Early career ===
Mampofu began her screen career in 2009 with a supporting role as Nontobeko in the drama film Umthandazo. She went on to appear in The Good Man (2012), playing the starring role of Katleho and later portrayed Monica in the 2014 film Mercy. Her early work in film helped establish her range in dramatic performance and introduced her to wider audiences.

Mampofu transitioned steadily into television, earning her first recurring role as a Spiritualist in the 2016 series Isikisi and a starring role as Zikhona Sebotsane in season 2 of Ingozi. In 2018 she appeared across several productions, including a recurring performance as Lerato in Ambitious, and the role of Claudia Dunn in seasons 2 and 3 of Unmarried. That same year, she joined The Queen as Benni in its third season.

=== 2019–2024: Breakthrough role in The River ===
In 2019, Mampofu featured as herself on Celeb Festival With Zola and portrayed the role of Marry in the Netflix action series Shadow. Her career gained further momentum in 2020 with roles in Lockdown Heights as Alutha and played the supporting role of Zaza "the mystery woman" across the first two seasons of Kings of Jo’Burg.

Mampofu received widespread recognition for her portrayal of Emma, a major character in The River, where she appeared from seasons 3 to 6. She won two Royalty Soapie Awards for her starring role for Emma from The River for Outstanding Supporting Actress and Best Actress categories by Viewers Choice. The year, she also included an appearance as herself on #Karektas hosted by Desmond Dube.

In 2023, Mampofu expanded her presence in both mainstream and streaming productions. She played a Sangoma in In Your Dreams, took on the starring role of Athi in the telenovela 1802: Love Defies Time and appeared as Brenda Grootboom in the thriller series Fatal Seduction.

Mampofu received a nominations for Best Supporting Actress in the South African Film and Television Awards. In 2024, she led the casts of Disaster Holiday as Nandi and Code 13 as Bongi Nkosi alongside Zolisa Xaluva, further solidifying her reputation as a prominent performer in South African film and television, and also international stages.

=== 2025–present: Lead roles in Levels and Inimba ===
In 2025, Mampofu began starring as Zoleka Ngcukana in the drama Inimba and joined the Mzansi Magic series Levels in the lead role of Bongi for its debut season with Bonko Khoza. She was nominated in the National Film and Television Awards for her starring role of Nandi in Disaster Holiday in the Best Actress category.

== Filmography ==
=== Film ===
Year	Title	Role	Notes
2009	Umthandazo	Nontobeko	Supporting role
2012	The Good Man	Katleho	Starring role
2014	Mercy	Monica	Supporting role
2024	Disaster Holiday	Nandi	Lead role

=== Television ===
Year	Title	Role	Notes
2016	Isikisi	Spiritualist	Recurring role
2016	Ingozi	Zikhona Sebotsane	Starring role
2018	Ambitious	Lerato	Recurring role
2018–2019	The Queen	Benni	Supporting role
2019	Celeb Festival With Zola	Herself	Episode 4
2019	Shadow	Marry	Recurring role
2020	Unmarried	Claudia Dunn	Starring role
2020	Lockdown Heights	Alutha	Supporting role
2020	#Karektas	Herself	Episode 25
2020–2023	Kings of Jo'Burg	Zaza	Supporting role
2020–2023	The River	Emma	Main role
2023	In Your Dreams	Sangoma	Recurring role
2023–2025	1802: Love Defies Time	Athi	Starring role
2023–2025	Fatal Seduction	Brenda Grootboom	Starring role
2024	Code 13	Bongi Nkosi	Lead role
2025	Levels	Bongi	Lead role
2025–present	Inimba	Zoleka Bikitsha Mabandla	Lead role

== Awards and nominations ==
Year	Association	Category	Nominated works	Result	Ref.
2023	Royalty Soapie Awards	Best Actress	As Emma on The River	Won	
2023	Royalty Soapie Awards	Outstanding Supporting Actress	As Emma on The River	Won	
2024	Feather Awards	Best Styled Individual	Herself	Won	
2024	Feather Awards	Hot Chick of the Year	Herself	Won	
2024	South African Film and Television Awards	Best Supporting actress	As Athi on 1802: Love Defies Time	Nominated	
2025	National Film and Television Awards	Best Actress	As Nandi on Disaster Holiday	Nominated	
2026	Africa Choice Awards	Female TV Star of the Year	Herself	Pending	
