= Mnqobi =

Mnqobi is a masculine given name. Notable people with the name include:

- Mnqobi Duma (fl. 1993–2014), South African actor
- Mnqobi Prince Msezane (fl. from 2024), South African politician
- Mnqobi Nxumalo (born 1994), known professionally as Lunatik or Lunatik Beats, South African recording artist, songwriter, and record producer
- Mnqobi Yazo (born 1992), South African singer-songwriter

== See also ==
- Nqobile feminine version
