= Critical But Stable =

South African drama television series

- Genre: Drama
- Created by: Angela Makholwa
- Written by: Julie Hall
- Directed by: Mengameli Nhlabathi; Sandile Mdluli
- Starring: Fortune Thobejane; Lawrence Maleka; Batsile Ramasodi; Thabo Malema; Mmarona Motshegoa; Motsoaledi Setumo; Seipati Mahamu; Mapaseka Koetle; Eve Rasimeni; Nqobile Khumalo
- Country of origin: South Africa
- Original languages: English; Zulu; Pedi; Sotho
- No. of seasons: 1
- No. of episodes: 13

Production
- Executive producers: Angela Makholwa; Mpho Lengane; Reneilwe Sema
- Producers: BriteSpark Films; Barkers Media
- Camera setup: Multi-camera
- Running time: 50–54 minutes

Original release
- Network: Mzansi Magic
- Release: 26 July – 18 October 2026

Critical But Stable is a South African television drama series produced by BriteSpark Films and Barkers Media premiered on Mzansi Magic on July 26, 2026. The series is based on the bestselling novel of the same name by a South African author Angela Makholwa.

== Premise ==
The series follows Duke, a struggling entrepreneur who convinces his childhood friends from their jazz–themed stokvel, Khula, to join a high stakes insurance scam to save both his failing business and his terminally ill wife.

== Cast ==
- Fortune Thobejane as Duke
- Lawrence Maleka as Mzi
- Batsile Ramasodi as Solomzi
- Thabo Malema as Thabo
- Mmarona Motshegoa as Noma
- Motsoaledi Setumo as Lerato
- Seipati Mahamu as Moshidi
- Mapaseka Koetle as Lovey
- Eve Rasimeni as Mantwa
- Nqobile Khumalo as Angela
- Ronnie Nyakale as Snakes
- Morena Sefatsa

== Production ==
Critical But Stable is a 13 episodes South African television drama series produced by Barkers Media and BriteSpark Films, which premiered on Mzansi Magic. Adapted from the bestselling 2021 novel, of the same name by author Angela Makholwa—who also serves as a co-executive producer through her company Red Ink. The production is executive produced alongside Reneilwe Sema and Mpho Lengane, with Gavin Joubert serving as the series producer.

== Release ==
The series premiered on Mzansi Magic from 26 July to 18 October 2026, airing every Sunday at 20:00.
