= In Your Dreams (2023 TV series) =

- Country of origin: South Africa
- Original language: English
- No. of seasons: 1
- No. of episodes: 6

Production
- Production company: Amazon Prime

Original release
- Network: Amazon MGM Studios

In Your Dreams is a South African fantasy drama television series written by Gareth Crocker and directed by Crocker and Fred Wolmarans. It is the first scripted television series by Amazon Studios produced in South Africa.

== Synopsis ==
Marcus and Lloyd, best friends from childhood and business partners in a pest control business, activate a powerful magical statue shown to them by Dineo, their former classmate who Marcus is in love with. The statue brings to life their dreams, nightmares, and fears. Marcus and Lloyd's apparitions haunt them until they overcome them with the help of Dineo.

== Cast ==
- Didintle Khunou as Dineo
- Kiroshan Naidoo as Lloyd
- Jesse Suntele as Marcus
- Anthony Oseyemi as Akin
- Sello Maake Ka-Ncube as Thato
- Kate Liquorish as Amanda
- Bongani Thwala as Baka
- Nqobile Sipamla as Palesa
- Lunathi Mampofu as Sangoma

== Production ==
In Your Dreams is the first scripted television series by Amazon Studios produced in South Africa. The series is produced by Motion Story, an independent South African production company.

The series debuted on Amazon Prime on 24 November 2023.
