= Beautifully Broken =

Beautifully Broken may refer to:

- Beautifully Broken (2018 film), an American Christian drama film
- Beautifully Broken (2025 film), an American documentary film directed by Daniel Herzog
- Beautifully Broken (album), a 2024 album by American singer Jelly Roll
- "Beautifully Broken", a 2010 episode from True Blood season 3
