= Msezane =

Msezane is a surname. Notable people with the surname include:

- Alfred Msezane (born 1938), South African physicist
- Mnqobi Prince Msezane, South African politician
- Sethembile Msezane (born 1991), South African visual artist and performer
