= Nqobile =

Nqobile is a South African unisex given name. Notable people with the name include:

- Nqobile Mhlongo, South African politician
- Nqobile Nunu Khumalo (born 1992), South African actress and model
- Nqobile Ntuli (born 1996), South African field hockey player
- Nqobile Sipamla (born 1984), South African actress, singer, and businesswoman
