= Smoke & Mirrors (TV series) =

- Genre: Telenovela
- Created by: Loyiso Maqoma
- Written by: Various writers
- Directed by: The Nodadas and various directors
- Starring: Ayanda Bandla-Ngubane; Meshack Mavuso; Siyabonga Thwala; Siya Sepotleko; Khayalethu Xaba; Lusanda Mbane; Herald Khumalo; Kgaogelo Monama; Angela Sithole; JT Medupe; Kamo Lestosa
- Music by: Samukelo Mahlalela; Mulaifa Ratshipaladze (Music editor)
- No. of seasons: 3

Production
- Executive producers: Zuko Nodada; Thandeka Nodada; Loyiso Maqoma
- Producers: Thandeka Nodada; Christa Greyling; Zuko Nodada
- Production locations: Johannesburg, South Africa
- Cinematography: Howard Nciweni
- Editor: Various editors
- Running time: 22-24 minutes
- Production company: The Final Chapter Production

Original release
- Network: e.tv
- Release: 17 April 2023 – 10 April 2026

Smoke & Mirrors was a South African television drama series created, written and produced by Loyiso Maqoma. It was an e.tv original series produced by The Final Chapter Production for e.tv, and stars Ayanda Bandla, Hlomla Dandala, Meshack Mavuso Magabane, Kabomo Vilakazi, Charmaine Mtinta and Lusanda Mbane, among others.

== Plot ==
Thandiswa Mseleku is a hairdresser by day and escort by night. She is haunted by the ghost of her sister, who was murdered to be used in a ritual by Caesar, Jaxon and Mthetho. Her relentless spirit forces Thandiswa to move into the mining town of Emnyameni to face the unholy trinity of morally corrupt men.

== Cast ==
Actors	Characters	Seasons		
Actors	Characters	Season 1	Season 2	Season 3
Ayanda Bandla-Ngubane	Thandiswa Mseleku	Main	Main	Main
Meshack Magabane	Jaxon Mkhize	Main	Main	Main
Lusanda Mbane	Martha Mayekiso	Main	Main	Main
Siyabonga Thwala	Zwelethu Mkhwanazi			Main
Siya Sepotleko	Sakhile Buthelezi	Main	Main	Main
Khayalethu Xaba	Mpendulo Buthelezi	Main	Main	
Herald Khumalo	Pastor Mandla	Main	Main	Main
Eyethu Myeza	Fanyana	Main	Main	Main
Zolisa Xaluva	Caeser Ngonyama	Main		
Hlomla Dandala	Caeser Ngonyama		Main	
Kabomo Vilakazi	Mthetho Moloi	Main		
JT Medupe	Leeroy Dlangamandla	Main	Main	Main
Kgaogelo Monama	Petunia Buthelezi	Recurring	Main	Main
Charmaine Mntinta	Mam Nomeva Ndamase	Main	Main	

=== Main ===
  - Ayanda Bandla-Ngubane as Thandiswa Mseleku formally addressed as Thandiswa Ngonyama. She is the unidentical twin sister of Xoliswa Mseleku. Her arrival cause havoc at Emnyameni and her mission is to avenge the death of her sister. She is the mother of Mpendulo Buthelezi whom she shares with Sakhile Buthelezi. She later marries Ceaser Ngonyama after knowingly learning he had a hand in the death of her sister.
  - Zolisa Xaluva (Season 1) and Hlomla Dandala (Season 2) as Caesar Ngonyama:Seen and respected as the man on top at Emnyameni; Ngonyama is described as a powerful businessman and the husband of Virginia Ngonyama to the public but in the shadows he is known to be the leader of the Holy Trinity. Ngonyama unknowning falls in love with Thandiswa Mseleku who has come to avenge the death of her sister. Ngonyama was killed by Thandiswa in Season 2 Finale.
  - Meshack Mavuso as Jaxon Mkhize:

Political driven by greed, Mkhize is described as hot shot mayor who is big time womanizer. He is plays the role of Hero during the day but Kills and kidnaps Children during the night. He fell in love with Martha Mayekiso and together they were able to dethrone Ceaser Ngonyama of the ownership of the mine.

  - Kabomo Vilakazi as Mthetho Moloi: Serving as the police captain of Emnyameni Police Station, Mthetho is described as kind and warm hearted person naturally who got caught up with the wrong friends. He thrives at catching criminal but not catching himself. He part of The Holy Trinity but wants to quit it all up. Moloi is also described as the secret lover of Leroy Dlangamandla who is public gay but Mthetho cannot disclose. Mthetho was killed by Thandiswa Mseleku in Season 1 finale before confessing to Thandiswa Mseleku that he, Jaxon Mkhize and Ceaser Ngonyama are all part of the Holy Trinity.
  - Lusanda Mbane as Martha Mayekiso: the vicious gold digger who has managed to seduces an old married and separate him from his wife. She is the owner of Emnyameni Hotel and one of the most successful entrepreneurs in the town. Mayekiso is described as woman who can go to any extent length to get the life she wants. She ends as the new love interest of Jaxon Mkhize.
  - Charmaine Mtinta as Nomeva Ndamase

described as the spiritual guide mother of Thandiswa Mseleku; Nomeva biggest spiritual mission begins after discovering of the existing of the Holy Trinity. She quickly spiritual parents Thandiswa and personally train her to avenge the death of her sister. Ndamase then disappeared for months before it was revealed that she was kidnapped by her spiritual oppents. At the end of Season 2, It was revealed that her biggest opponent is actually her biological son.

  - Siya Sepotokele Raymond as Sakhile Buthelezi : The graciously calm ; well mannered man and husband of Nthaniseng Buthelezi. Had his life going absolutely fine before discovering that her ex lover is in town and that he has a son. Embracing his new fatherhood journey, death surfaced and took his wife, while grieving; Buthelezi found comfort in the arms of Virginia Ngonyama who happens to be her late wife's best friend. The relationship quickly came to an end after Virginia Ngonyama slept with his son in attempt get to Thandiswa. A year later Sakhile married new love interest Petunia whom he adores.
  - Khayalethu Xaba as Mpendulo Buthelezi: the young charming boy whose arrival cause havoc at Emnyameni High School. Unplanned ;but quickly Mpendulo falls in love with Millicent Dlamini but their relationship did not last due to Millicent moving away to a safer place for safety concerns. It was then revealed that he is the son of Sakhile Buthelezi. Before time could tell he has already formed a strong relationships with his father and life went on. After finishing High School, Mpendulo started working at Emnyameni Hotel where she met and fell in love with Sindi . Love blossomed and Sindi discovered she was pregnant. Unknownling celebrating the new journey he was about to embark, Sindi was murdered by the Holy Trinity. Rising above the Ashes of the death his girlfriend and their unborn child Mpendulo started embracing his mother new found love with Ceaser Ngonyama whom it later was revealed to have killed her aunt and girlfriend.

== Production ==
Pre-production for the series started in September 2022, with the series filmed in Sasani Studios, with some footage filmed around Johannesburg. The series was then renewed for season 2, for which pre-production began in December 2023.

=== Casting ===
Zolisa Xaluva was cast as Caeser, while Ayanda Bandla was announced as Thandiswa.

e.tv hosted a launch party on Sunday 16 April 2023, for Smoke & Mirrors. The series was launched alongside e.tv's other telenovela Nikiwe.

In April 2024, it was announced that Zolisa Xaluva would exit the series due to investigations / parties involvement. Hlomla Dandala took over the role as Caeser from the second season of the series.

=== KwaNgonyama: The Movie ===
Certain episodes of the series were filmed in KwaBhaca, Eastern Cape, alongside a short film, titled KwaNgonyama: The Movie. The episodes, along with the film, focused entirely on Caesar and how he became a ruthless cold-hearted villain. The episodes were filmed in partnership with the Eastern Cape Development Corporation, and starred Sive Mabuya and Thembekile Komani.

=== Allegations of plagiarism ===
In April 2023, it was reported that reality-TV star Tebogo Ramokgadi accused e.tv series producer Khanyi Nxumalo of plagiarising the show concept. Screenshots of WhatsApp messages and emails detailed that the series was registered in 2019, with the pilot episode filmed costing R1 million, and pitched to e.tv in 2021 by Leo Phiri. According to news articles, Tebogo's version of the series was meant to be a 13-episode series, set in a mining town and filmed in the North West. Tebogo threatened to sue eMedia for stealing his intellectual property. eMedia released a media statement on 21 April 2023, confirming Tebogo's unsolicited proposal, stated that the proposal was based on a royal family and their celebrity couple friends grappling with their sexual identity was rejected, and that the name of the series is simply a common phrase, and that any similarities were purely coincidental.

== Broadcast ==
The series premiered on e.tv on 17th April 2023 and ended on 10th April 2026 after running for 3 seasons. The series was also added to streaming service eVOD.

=== International broadcast ===
The series is distributed in French-speaking territories through Canal+ and A+, under the title Le Voile de L'illusion (lit. The Veil of Illusion).

== Reception ==
=== Critical reception ===
The series reached 1.7 million viewers in its debut, and later reached 3 million viewers in October 2023. The series went on to become the third most watched series on the channel, ultimately beating e.tv's longest-running soapie Scandal!. Critics attribute its debut figures to e.tv's lack of effort in promoting the series.
