= Paballo Koza =

South African influencer and actor (born 2002)

- Born: Paballo Koza; 19 March 2002 (age 24); Johannesburg, South Africa
- Education: New York Film Academy
- Occupations: Actor; influencer; entrepreneur; tv presenter
- Years active: 2007–present

Paballo Koza (born March 19, 2002) is a South African actor, influencer, entrepreneur and TV presenter. He is best known for his notable roles in Mzansi Magic popular telenovela series as Khaya in The Queen and Housekeeper as Mtho. He began acting at age 5 and later received an Africa Movie Academy Award nomination for Best Young Actor for his starring role in Dora's Peace.

== Early life ==
Koza was born on 19 March 2002, in Johannesburg, South Africa. He was helped by his maternal grandmother to get an acting agency which got him the commercial role that got him noticed. He attended the New York Film Academy after passing his matric and also graduated from the National School of the Arts, in Johannesburg, where he studied Dramatic Arts.

== Career ==
=== 2007-2015: Career beginnings ===
Koza started acting at age five by acting in a commercial. Since then, he's been in a number of other commercials and has acted in a variety of television shows and movies. He made his first acting debut in 2014 where he played the role of Shoni Makwarela in SABC 2 drama Thola and short film The Blanket as Mandla. In 2015, he made his appearance in e.tv as Zama in Rhythm City. Later, he played a role of Umfaan in a comedian short drama Skorokoro.

=== 2016-2022: Breakthrough and Dora's Peace ===
Koza bagged a starring role of Peace in a popular South African film Dora's Peace along Khabonina Qubeka. He appeared in Mzansi Magic drama series The Queen as Khaya Khoza from 2016 to 2021. In 2017, he played the main role of Moagi in a drama Easy Money and The Imposter season 1 as Themba. Koza's career in acting had been successfully as he won several awards including Africa Movie Academy Awards for his role in Dora's Peace at the age of 14. By 2018, he appeared in three television drama series such as Housekeepers as the lead cast Mtho from 2018 to 2022, Isithembiso season 2 as a supporting cast portraying as Junior's friend and SABC 1 comedy Thandeka's Diary as Themba. In 2020, he played the support role as Dombollo in BET telenovela Isono and appeared in Netflix drama series Riding with Sugar as Vetkoek. In 2022, he played the crime/drama series Amandla as Phakiso.

=== 2023-present: Classified and Playroom Live ===
In 2023, Koza bagged the main role in Classified as Lolo. By 2024, he was the presenter in kids show Playroom live.

== Filmography ==
=== Television ===
| Year | Title | Role |
|---|---|---|
| 2024 | Playroom live | Himself |
| 2023–present | Classified | Lolo |
| 2018 | Housekeepers | Mtho |
| 2016 | The Queen | Khaya Khoza |
| 2020 | Isono | Dombollo |
| 2017 | Easy Money | Moagi |
| 2017 | The Imposter | Themba |
| 2014 | Thola | Shoni Makwarela |
| 2018 | Thandeka’s Diary | Themba |
| 2015 | Rhythm City | Zama |
| 2018 | Isithembiso | Junior's Friend |

=== Film ===
| Year | Title | Role |
|---|---|---|
| 2022 | Amandla | Phakiso |
| 2020 | Riding With Sugar | Vetkoek |
| 2016 | Dora's Peace | Peace |
| 2015 | Skorokoro | Umfaan |
| 2014 | The Blanket | Mandla |

== Awards and nominations ==
| Year | Association | Category | Nominated works | Result | Ref. |
|---|---|---|---|---|---|
| 2017 | African Movie Academy Awards | Best Young Actor | As Peace in Dora's Peace | Nominated | |
