= Levels (TV series) =

South African drama television series

- Genre: Crime; thriller
- Created by: Busisiwe Ntintili
- Written by: Busisiwe Ntintili; Saint Seseli; Bakang Sebatjane; Lwazi Mvusi; Denny Miller; Trish Malone
- Directed by: Fikile Mogodi; Pheello J Makosholo; Siyabonga Mkhize
- Starring: Lunathi Mampofu; Bonko Khoza; Charmaine Mtinta; Momo Matsunyane; Melusi Mbele; Joseph Sedibo; Unathi Mkhize; Ntobeko Mathebula; Mthobisi Khanyile; Luyanda Zuma; Khayalethu Xaba; Sikelelwa Vuyeleni
- Country of origin: South Africa
- Original language: English
- No. of seasons: 1
- No. of episodes: 13

Production
- Executive producers: Busisiwe Ntintili; Saint Seseli
- Producer: Ntintili Factory
- Camera setup: Multi-camera
- Running time: 50–54 minutes

Original release
- Network: Mzansi Magic
- Release: 7 September – 30 November 2025

Levels is a South African television series that aired on Mzansi Magic produced by Busisiwe Ntintili. The series centres on a wealthy family operating in the construction and property development industry and explores themes of power corruption, family conflict and ambition.

== Premise ==
Levels is a South African television drama series that follows the Zungu family, owners of a powerful construction and property development company. The series explores their rise to wealth and influence, while exposing the corruption, greed and moral compromises behind their success. It focuses on intense family rivalries, secrets and betrayals, as well as the personal and professional struggles faced by those drawn into their world of power.

== Cast ==
=== Main cast ===
- Lunathi Mampofu as Bongi
- Bonko Khoza as Steve
- Charmaine Mtinta as Esmeralda
- Melusi Mbele as Frans
- Momo Matsunyane as Dorothy
- Joseph Sedibo as Buhle
- Unathi Mkhize as Sihle
- Ntobeko Mathebula as Mdu
- Mthobisi Khanyile as Thulani
- Luyanda Zuma as Pilot Mo
- Sikelelwa Vuyeleni as Samkelo

=== Supporting cast ===
- Khayalethu Xaba as Ayanda
- Zukisa Matola as Lindiwe
- Kabomo Vilakazi as George
- Zigi Ndlhovu as Stan
- Peter Mashigo as Dan
- Khayakazi Kula as Ntombi

== Production ==
Levels is a South African television drama series that premiered on Mzansi Magic. The show follows the Zungu family, owners of a powerful construction and property development company as they navigate intense family rivalries, secrets and betrayals. The series explores themes of power, corruption and ambition. The show features an ensemble cast, including Lunathi Mampofu, Bonko Khoza, Melusi Mbhele, Charmaine Mtinta and Sikelelwa Vuyelani among others. The show is produced by Busisiwe Ntintili and Saint Seseli, it consists of 13 episodes.

== Release ==
The series premiered on Mzansi Magic from 7 September 2025 to 30 November 2025, airing only on Sundays at 20:00 for one hour.
