= Umthetho =

South African drama television series

- Genre: Crime drama; thriller
- Created by: Mandla N
- Written by: Jose Domingos; Rami Nhlapo; Boitumelo Masemola; Makanaka Mavengere
- Directed by: Mandla N; Johnny Barbuzano; Jonathan Hall; Melissa Nayimuli
- Starring: Nqobile Khumalo; Tony Kgoroge; Given Stuurman; Lorcia Cooper; Ernest Msibi; Sindi Dlathu; Sthembiso Khoza; Mandla Gaduka; Molefi Monaisa
- Country of origin: South Africa
- Original languages: Zulu; English
- No. of seasons: 1
- No. of episodes: 7

Production
- Executive producers: Mandla N; Mpumelelo Nhlapo; Annelie van Rooyen
- Producer: Black Brain Pictures
- Camera setup: Multi-camera
- Running time: 36–56 minutes

Original release
- Network: Netflix
- Release: 14 August 2026

Related
- Brotherhood

Umthetho is a South African crime drama thriller television series that premiered on Netflix on 14 August 2026. The series is created by Mandla N and produced by the Black Brain Pictures. It is a localized adaptation of the Brazilian Netflix crime drama Brotherhood.

== Premise ==
Mbali Dlamini is a brilliant public prosecutor. Her life is upended when she discovers that her estranged older brother, Moses, whom she was told died 14 years prior is actually alive and operating a ruthless prison syndicate. When their youngest brother, Sphelele, becomes endangered by the criminal underworld, Mbali is forced to become an informant and double agent within Moses's gang. She feels intense moral conflict, torn between family loyalty and survival to uphold the law.

== Cast ==
=== Main cast ===
- Nqobile Khumalo as Mbali Dlamini
- Tony Kgoroge as Moses Dlamini
- Given Stuurman as Sphelele Dlamini
- Lorcia Cooper as Crystal Dlamini
- Ernest Msibi as Scarra
- Molefi Monaisa as Detective Bennet Tau
- Sindi Dlathu as Agnes Khoza
- Sthembiso Khoza as Zola
- Mandla Gaduka as Oros

=== Supporting cast ===
- Sello Ramolahloane as Valaza
- Lungelo Madondo as Ntombi
- Siphiwe Nkosi as Pastor Sibiya
- Brenda Mhlongo as Unathi
- Hlubi Mboya as Lolo
- Robert Hobbs as David Shultz
- Obed Baloyi as Guard Setshaba
- Bhekumuzi Mkwanazi as Guard Nyaniso
- Skhulile Mgaga as Luvo
- Wayne Van Rooyen as Detective Banda
- Fana Mokoena as MEC
- Herald Khumalo
- Albert Van Vuuren as Arresting Detective

== Production ==
Umthetho is a Netflix South African crime drama series produced by Black Brain Pictures and executive produced by Mandla N, Mpumelelo Nhlapo and Annelie Van Rooyen. The series features a directing team of Mandla N, Johnny Barbuzano and Jonathan Hall, Melissa Nayimuli as the creative director. The head writer was Jose Domingos. Joel Assaizky and Kurt Slabbert composed the musical score.

== Release ==
The series premiered on Netflix on 14 August 2026.
