= Ronnie Nyakale =

South African actor (born 1973)

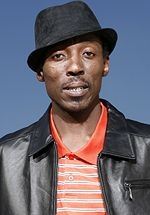
- Born: Ronnie Nyakale; 1 February 1973 (age 53); Soweto, South Africa
- Other names: Cosmo Diale, Uncle Cosmo
- Occupations: Actor, MC, entrepreneur
- Years active: 1999–present
- Known for: Papa Action, Cosmo Diale
- Height: 178 cm (5 ft 10 in)
- Spouse: Lebegang Mashilo
- Children: 1
- Awards: Best Television Actor

Ronnie Nyakale (born 1 February 1973) is a South African actor, MC and entrepreneur. He is best known for the roles in the films: Blood Diamond (2006), Machine Gun Preacher (2011), Gangster's Paradise: Jerusalema (2008) and "Cosmo Diale" on Generations: The Legacy (2016 - current).

== Personal life ==
Nyakale was born in Soweto, South Africa. He is married to Lebogang Mashilo. The couple has one daughter.

== Career ==
In 1999, he made his film debut with a short film titled Portrait of a Young Man Drowning. In the same year, he acted in the SABC1 television drama series Yizo yizo with the role "gangster Papa Action", where he later won the Best Supporting Actor Award in Drama Series category at the NTVA Avanti Awards. After that success, he joined with e.tv soap opera Rhythm City and played the role of gangster, "Ding Dong". In 2006, he acted in the series A Place Called Home by playing the critic acclaimed role "Sylvester". For that role, he was nominated for the Best Actor Award in TV Drama category at the 2010 South African Film and Television Awards (SAFTA). In 2006, he acted in the Hollywood blockbuster Blood Diamond. In the meantime, he joined with the television miniseries Fallen in 2007. For that miniseries, he won the Best Supporting Actor Award in TV Drama category at the 2012 SAFTA.

In 2008, he acted in the film Gangster's Paradise: Jerusalema and played the role "Zakes Mbolelo". In 2011, he played the lead role "AJ" in the film Machine Gun. The film received critics acclaim as well. Then he made a supportive role "Captain Stone" in the film Avenged, which was previously known as iNumber Number. In 2013, he starred in the Mzansi Magic miniseries Naledi with the role "Pheto". Then In 2017, he joined with the cast of first season of Generations the Legacy and played the role of "Cosmo Diale".

== Filmography ==
Year	Film	Role	Genre	Ref.
1999	Portrait of a Young Man Drowning	Shadow	Short film	
1999	Yizo Yizo	Ben "Papa Action" Mokoena	TV series	
2001	Dr Lucille: The Lucille Teasdale Story		TV movie	
2001	Transit Cafe	Vuyo	TV movie	
2002	In Desert and Wilderness		Film	
2006	Blood Diamond	Digger 1	Film	
2006	A Place Called Home	Sylvester	TV series	
2008	Jerusalema	Zakes Mbolelo	Film	
2008	Silent Witness	Mizinga	TV series	
2010	Jozi	Feather duster salesman	Film	
2010	State of Violence	Strike	Film	
2011	Machine Gun Preacher	AJ	Film	
2011	Lucky	Moli	Film	
2013	Zaziwa	Himself	TV series	
2013	Durban Poison	Black man	Film	
2013	Avenged	Captain Stone	Film	
2015	Kingmakers		TV series	
2015	The Call	Customer	Short film	
2016	Dora's Peace	Vusi	Film	
2016–present	Generations: The Legacy	Cosmo Diale	TV series	
2017	iNumber Number	Capt. Stone	TV series	
2021	Reyka	MaBusi Stranger	TV Series	
2026	Critical But Stable	Snakes	TV series	
