= Mapaseka Koetle =

South African actress and businesswoman

- Koetle in 2025
- Born: 23 March 1989 (age 37); Bloemfontein, Free State (province), Orange Free State, South Africa
- Other name: Pasi Koetle Mapaseka Nyokong(former formal name)
- Occupations: Actress; business woman; blogger
- Years active: 2011–present
- Known for: Scandal!
- Spouse: Nelson Nyokong (m. 2021; div. 2023)
- Children: 1

Mapaseka Koetle (born 23 March 1989) is a South African actress, businesswoman and blogger. She is known for her role as Dintle Nyathi in South African soap drama television series Scandal!. She appeared on the 2018 Forbes Africa "30 Under 30" list.

== Early years and education ==
Koetle was born and raised in Bloemfontein, Free State. She began her tertiary education at AFDA, and completed her studies at CityVarsity.

== Filmography ==
=== Film ===
Year	Film	Role	Notes
2024	Losing Lerato 2	Lolitha	Main role, season 2

=== Television ===
Year	Film	Role	Genre
2014–2026	Scandal!	Dintle Nyathi	Lead role
2020	Gereza	TV Reporter	Supporting role
2023	Lenyalo Hase Papadi	Tebogo	Lead role, 13 episodes
2024	How To Ruin Love:The Proposal	Katlego	Starring role
2024	0.16FM	Thuli Mothusi	Starring role
2026	How To Ruin Love: The Lobola	Katlego	Starring role
2026	Critical But Stable	Lovey	Supporting role, 13 episodes
2026	Nyala O...	Kea Maponya	Lead role, season 1

== Personal life ==
She is married to Nelson Nyokong. Together they have one child, Nema. It was noted by reporters that Mapaseka has divorced her husband Nelson Nyokong.

Together with her husband, she opened and runs a franchise restaurant called Gorge Grab n Go Café, situated outside the Sandton Gautrain station in Johannesburg.

She donates sanitary pads to needy girls. She blogs about her experiences as a mother and hosts events which focus on anything concerning motherhood.
