= Noxolo Dlamini =

South African actress

- Born: 14 September 1993 (age 33); Soweto, South Africa
- Education: University of Pretoria
- Years active: 2016–present

Noxolo Dlamini (born 14 September 1993) is a South African actress. On television, she is known for her role in the Netflix series Jiva (2021). She won a SAFTA for her performance in the film Silverton Siege (2022). Her other films include Death of a Whistleblower (2023) and 180 (2026).

== Early life ==
Dlamini was born in Chiawelo, a suburb of Soweto. The youngest of five children, she was raised Pentecostal by a single mother. Dlamini trained for two years at the National School of Arts in Johannesburg and went on to graduate with a Bachelor of Arts (BA) in Drama from the University of Pretoria in 2014.

== Career ==
After graduating from university, Dlamini made her professional stage debut when she joined the ensemble of the West End production of The Lion King at London's Lyceum Theatre. She also understudied Nala, but did not get to play her at the time. In 2017, she had her first lead stage role in the Sarafina! revival at the South African State Theatre in Pretoria. She returned to the role of Nala on the 2018 tour of The Lion King and to Sarafina! at the Joburg Theatre in 2019. She also made her television debut in an episode of the 2018 DR1 miniseries Liberty, appeared in Nina Simone: Four Women at the Market Theatre in 2019 and had her first recurring role as Nkosazana in the Mzansi Magic telenovela Isibaya.

Dlamini starred as Ntombi in the 2021 Netflix series Jiva!. The following year, she made her feature film debut in Silverton Siege on Netflix and joined the main casts of the Mzansi Magic series The Republic and Housekeepers for their second and third seasons as Thina and Thobi respectively. For her performance in Silverton Siege, Dlamini won a SAFTA.

In 2023, Dlamini starred as Luyanda Masinda in the political thriller film Death of a Whistleblower and also had a role in the film iNumber Number: Jozi Gold. She played Amahle in the 2024 Netflix series How to Ruin Love: The Proposal. She appeared in the 2025 films Sniper: The Last Stand, G20 and Cop & a Half. In 2026, she starred as Portia in the Netflix film 180.

== Filmography ==
=== Film ===
Year	Title	Role	Notes
2022	Silverton Siege	Mbali Terra Mabunda	Netflix film
2023	iNumber Number: Jozi Gold	Dimo	Netflix film
2023	Death of a Whistleblower	Luyanda Masinda	
2025	Sniper: The Last Stand	Annika aka Angel	
2025	G20	Lesedi	Amazon Prime film
2025	Cop & a Half	Busi	Amazon Prime film
2026	180	Portia	Netflix film

=== Television ===
Year	Title	Role	Notes
2018	Liberty	Crying Mother	1 episode
2019	Isibaya	Nkosazana	
2021	Uzalo	Client	1 episode
2021	Jiva	Ntombi	Main role
2022	The Republic	Thina	Main role (season 2)
2022	Housekeepers	Thobi	Main role (season 3)
2024	How to Ruin Love: The Proposal	Amahle	Co-starring role

== Stage ==
Year	Title	Role	Notes
2016	The Lion King	Ensemble / cover Nala	Lyceum Theatre, London
2017	Sarafina!	Sarafina	South African State Theatre, Pretoria
2018	The Lion King	Nala	tour
2019	Sarafina!	Sarafina	Joburg Theatre
2019	Nina Simone: Four Women	Sephronia	Market Theatre, Johannesburg

== Awards and nominations ==
Year	Award	Category	Work	Result	Ref.
2022	Septimius Awards	Best African Actress	Silverton Siege	Nominated	
2023	South African Film and Television Awards	Best Actress – Feature Film	Silverton Siege	Won	
2023	National Film & TV Awards	Best Actress – Feature Film	Silverton Siege	Nominated	
2023	National Film & TV Awards	Best Supporting Actress – Feature Film	iNumber Number: Jozi Gold	Nominated	
2026	South African Film and Television Awards	Best Actress – Feature Film	Death of a Whistleblower	Pending	
