= Hive (2026 film) =

- Release poster
- Directed by: Felipe Vargas
- Screenplay by: Felipe Vargas
- Based on: Hive by Felipe Vargas
- Produced by: Nick Scully; Adam Friedlander; Darren Cameron
- Starring: Xochitl Gomez; Aaron Dominguez; Zenobia Kloppers; Victoria Firsova; Tanya van Graan; Jenny le Roux; Thulani Nzonzo
- Cinematography: Carmen Cabana
- Edited by: Rafael Souza
- Music by: Rene G. Boscio
- Production company: Blue Ice Pictures
- Distributed by: Tubi
- Release date: April 17, 2026
- Running time: 91 minutes
- Country: Canada
- Language: English

Hive is a 2026 Canadian horror thriller film written and directed by Felipe Vargas, based on his short film of the same name. It stars Xochitl Gomez, Aaron Dominguez, Zenobia Kloppers, Victoria Firsova, Tanya van Graan, Jenny le Roux, and Thulani Nzonzo.

== Plot ==
Sasha is a new babysitter in the prestigious neighborhood of Coral Grove. She is scheduled to babysit a young girl named Zaley Viviers whose mother Camille is a graduate of Winscott, the school Sasha wanted to go to for Pre-medical education. It was an opportunity she deferred due to the financial strain it would put on her family. Zaley's mother offers to tell the financial aid office about her good conduct, provided she takes good care of her daughter.

Zaley and Sasha form an amicable relationship. Things take a turn when they have to go back to the park, against her mother's orders, to find Zaley's lost doll. Zaley ignores Sasha's instructions that she is not there to play and goes down the tube slide, but doesn't come back out. Sasha frantically searches for Zaley around the park, but the only other people at the park are children with absent caretakers, and they are seemingly unconscious to the outside world.

Zaley and Sasha finally reunite, but are approached by another employee of Coral Grove, who tells Sasha that the babysitters are being eaten by a mysterious force and urges her to leave while she still can. Instead, Sasha and Zaley make their way back to Zaley's house. Zaley complains of pain. Sasha finds a large, yellow boil on Zaley's cheek and attempts to clean it for her. Zaley backs away from Sasha's attempts to touch her neck further.

Zaley attempts to strangle Sasha using a yo-yo, wounding her neck and face. Sasha attacks back in self-defense. Camille comes home and finds Sasha frantic; Sasha attempts to tell her about what Zaley did. She walks further into the house to find Zaley, who accuses Sasha of instigating the fight. Sasha leaves the house, frightened and intending to seek help.

Sasha meets up with her brother Marco and his friend, Darius, whom she tells about the aforementioned events. After she and her brother talk, Sasha sees the entire playground sink into the ground. Darius is still outside of the truck by the time Sasha warns him and is impaled by the rungs of one of the playground structures.

Marco approaches the playground and finds himself trapped in a green-lit tunnel with a strange girl approaching him. Marco manages to escape, but as he and Sasha are turning to leave, she hears Zaley's voice and is knocked to the ground by a swing. While she is down, she is dragged into the slide by an invisible force.

Marco leaves the playground and finds the house of Frances, the housekeeper who warned Sasha earlier. He pleads with her to help him. She explains that the creature behind this uses children as sleeper agents to lure in babysitters so that they can be consumed by the hive mind. She tells Marco about the first victim, a fellow babysitter, Mabel Grace, whose disappearance was the only reason that she herself stayed in Coral Grove, as she and Mabel had been good friends.

Marco returns to the playground and uses a rope to lower himself down into the playground's tunnels in hopes of finding his sister. Throughout the tunnels, he finds many people controlled by the hive mind before he is able to find Sasha. He frees her by pouring a bag of candy, given to him by their father, onto the part of the hive mind containing Sasha. This weakens the hive mind, causing it to release Sasha.

As they attempt to escape the tunnels, the agents controlled by the hive mind approach Sasha and Marco. Sasha finds the person being used as a host body for the hive mind. She attempts to help her remember who she actually is, figuring out that she is Mabel Grace. Sasha is dragged out of the tunnel by Marco. They get into a fight, having very different opinions on how they should handle this. Sasha attempts to reopen the tunnels, but the hive mind has closed them. With the help of Frances, they burn through all of the tunnels with a sugar concoction they made.

Sasha is confronted by Camille and Zaley while she is attempting to burn through the tunnel at the original playground. Camille walks into the playground and is taken over by the hive mind, which summons other agents of the hive mind to come towards Sasha. They are repelled by Marco, who pours the sugar mixture all over them.

Despite their attempts to flee, they are dragged back to the playground by the agents. The agents break Marco's leg. Sasha manages to escape by using the weed killer that Marco and Darius had in the bed of their truck, which is made of syrup and sugar. She climbs to the top of the playground and dumps the vat of weed killer into the tunnel, effectively disintegrating the hive mind and allowing those it controlled to escape. She helps Mabel Grace into the bed of the truck, with her and Frances reuniting. Sasha drives Marco, Frances, and Mabel Grace to the hospital, but not before eating from the bag of candy their father gave them.

== Cast ==
- Xochitl Gomez as Sasha
- Aaron Dominguez as Marco
- Zenobia Kloppers as Frances
- Victoria Firsova as Zaley
- Tanya van Graan as Camille
- Jenny le Roux as Mrs. Vaux
- Thulani Nzonzo as Darius

== Production ==
In May 2025, during the Upfront presentation, Tubi announced three young adult oriented films, one of which was Hive, a horror thriller film written and directed by Felipe Vargas, with Xochitl Gomez cast in the lead role. Gomez starred in the short film of the same name. In March 2026, it was revealed that Aaron Dominguez, Zenobia Kloppers, Victoria Firsova, Tanya van Graan, Jenny le Roux, and Thulani Nzonzo had joined the cast.

== Release ==
Hive was released on Tubi on April 17, 2026.
