= Skorokoro =

2016 South African film

- Written by: Darrell Roodt; Tarryn-Tanille Prinsloo
- Directed by: Darrell Roodt
- Starring: Papiso Keogatile; Boikie Pholo; Paballo Koza; Mbalenhle Zakwe; Meme Ditshego; Charlie Bouguenon; Reine Swart; Graeme Kriega; Byron Kennedy
- Music by: Grant Booth; Alun Richards
- Country of origin: South Africa

Production
- Producers: Christianne Bennetto; Samuel Frauenstein; Dries Maree; Andre Frauenstein
- Cinematography: Pierre Smith
- Editor: Leon Gerber
- Production company: Phoenix Films

Original release
- Release: 2016

Skorokoro is a 2016 South African TV Film directed by Darrell Roodt. It was nominated for a Golden Horn award in 2017. The film was produced by Phoenix films in South Africa.

The movie was originally planned as a big screen production but failed to make the grade and was reduced to airing only as a local TV production.

== Plot ==
Happiness and Rose fall in love in a small village in South Africa. They would like to get married, but their families keep that from happening. Happiness decides to enter a race with his old taxi in order to win prize money to pay for his lobola. Happiness will be allowed to marry Rose if and only if he can pay the required lobola.
