= Dube on 2 =

- Genre: Sketch comedy Talk show
- Starring: Desmond Dube; Phumeza Dlwati; John Lata; Jessica Mbangeni; Angela de Villiers
- Country of origin: South Africa
- No. of series: 2
- No. of episodes: 26

Production
- Running time: 30 minutes
- Production company: Urban Brew Studios

Original release
- Network: SABC 2
- Release: 2004 – 6 January 2007

Dube on 2 is a South African television comedy talk show and sketch comedy show hosted by Desmond Dube, and broadcast by SABC 2 from 2004 to 2007. Regular cast members include Lee Duru, John Lata, and (in the second season) Angela de Villiers, among others. South African celebrities—such as Ishmael, Simphiwe Dana, and Lebo Mathosa—made guest appearances on the show.
