= Khabonina Qubeka =

South African actress, dancer and businesswoman

- Born: 22 January 1981 (age 45); Orlando West Extension, Soweto, South Africa
- Other names: Khabodacious. Nina
- Education: Moving into Dance
- Occupation: Actress Dancer
- Known for: Isidingo
- Children: 1

Khabonina Qubeka (born 22 January 1981) is a South African actress, television presenter, dancer, choreographer, businesswoman and singer. In 2017, she won best actress at the Boston International Film Festival Awards and was nominated as best actress at the Florida Film Festival and Best Actress at the Africa Movie Academy Awards for her role as "Dora" in Dora's Peace. As of 2017, she plays the role of gangster Nina Zamdela on the SABC 3 soap opera Isidingo.

She hosted a BET show Fix My Love and has been known for her role as Maxine on a South African award winning show The Wild.

As a professional dancer and choreographer, she has hosted and been a judge on numerous television dance reality shows - SABC 1's Dance Your Butt Off, eTV's Step Up or Step Out. She also choreographed The Channel O Music Video Awards.

Qubeka, a yoga enthusiast, produced and hosted her own health and fitness show called Gym e'Kasi for eTV and Open View HD.

In 2018, she launched her own Afro Yoga concept in Hong Kong and received a City University award of the highest honour of a professional creative for the world from the director of City University Mr Wilson Lam and YogaRaj himself.

== Acting career ==
Qubeka first rose to prominence playing the character of Doobsie on the SABC 2 soapie "Muvhango", from 2006 to 2007 (being the third actress to portray the role after Lindiwe Chibi and Khanyi Mbau). She had various other TV roles in the following years, including in the SABC drama series For Sale (2007), The Lab (2008) and on the eTV soapie "Rhythm City", in 2009. As of 2010, she started in the M-Net telenovela The Wild, as well as appearing on the shows The Mating Game and Erfsondes. In 2014, she hosted her own fitness and lifestyle show on OpenView HD's eKasi+ channel, called Gym e'Kasi (Gym at Home), about making the right food and exercise choices in the comfort of your home and neighbourhood. She's also done the political thriller Ihawu Lesizwe, for the SABC. In 2017, she won the Indie Spirit Award for best actress at the Boston International Film Festival. She got the award for playing the character Dora in the film, Dora's Peace. According to her, starring in the film made her see prostitutes from a different perspective. The film was also screened at Orlando Film Festival and Beijing International Film Festival. In 2017, she was reported to be acting as Nina Zamdela in television series, Isidingo. In the same year, she was also reported to be releasing a new film, titled She is King. In October 2017, she was announced as the hostess of a new South African program, that is centered around school teachers.

In addition to acting, Qubeka is also a dancer and fitness advocate. She regularly uses social media to promote healthy lifestyles and body shape. Khabonina is now acting for the known drama series which is Generations the Legacy as Oby Abudu and as wife to Vuyo Dabula who is Kumkani Phakade

== Music career ==
In 2010, Qubeka wrote and released her first album titled Gama Lahko, under her own music label Khabodacious Moves Music. The album consisted of 12 tracks, and included the singles "Gama Lakho" and "Bring Your Body". Both tracks received music videos, produced by Qubeka. In 2013, she released a rap song titled, "Wax It (Wax On Wax Off)" which went viral in 2018.

== Personal life ==
Qubeka gave birth to her first child, a girl, in October 2018.
