= Nyala O... =

South African drama television series

- Genre: Telenovela
- Created by: Mmamitse Thibedi; Thembakuye Madlala
- Written by: Chisanga Kabinga; Caroline Doherty
- Directed by: Mmamitse Thibedi; Nthabi Tau; Lebo Kobedi; Thembakuye Madlala
- Starring: Mapaseka Koetle; Motlatsi Mafatshe; Tsholofelo Matshaba; Aubrey Mmakola; Cindy Mahlangu; Unathi Mkhize
- Country of origin: South Africa
- Original languages: English; Xhosa; Setswana
- No. of seasons: 1
- No. of episodes: 156

Production
- Executive producers: Mmamitse Thibedi; Leanne Khumalo
- Producer: Origins Pictures
- Camera setup: Multi-camera
- Running time: 22–24 minutes

Original release
- Network: Mzansi Magic
- Release: 20 July 2026 – present

Nyala O... is a South African television telenovela created by Mmamitse Thibedi and Thembakuye Madlala and produced by Origins Pictures. The series premiered on Mzansi Magic and follows three female friends as they navigate changes in their marriages and personal lives following their weddings. Its storylines address relationship conflicts, financial difficulties and betrayal.

== Premise ==
Nyala O... examines polygamous relationships and traditional customs in contemporary South Africa. The series follows individuals and couples as they navigate the emotional, financial and cultural considerations associated with introducing an additional partner into an existing marriage. Its episodes address family negotiations, relationship dynamics and differing perspectives on traditional and contemporary expectations.

== Cast ==
=== Main cast ===
- Mapaseka Koetle as Kea Maponya
- Motlatsi Mafatshe as Rhami Maponya
- Tsholofelo Matshaba as Mapula Matlala
- Aubrey Mmakola as Ernest Matlala
- Cindy Mahlangu as Lerato Dlamini
- Unathi Mkhize as Mondli

=== Supporting cast ===
- Amanda Seome as Pretty
- Elizabeth Serunye as Gertrude
- Slindile Nodangala as Gabisile
- Kgomotso Moshia as Tshepi
- Sluleko Zungu as Lethabo

== Release ==
The series premiered on Mzansi Magic on 20 July 2026, airing on Monday to Wednesday every week at 19:00.
