= Lusanda Mbane =

South African actress and television personality

- Born: Lusanda C. Sangoni; 16 February 1978 (age 48); Eastern Cape, South Africa
- Education: Clarendon High School for Girls
- Alma mater: University of South Africa
- Occupations: Actress, Radio personality, Speaker, Entrepreneur
- Years active: 2007–present
- Spouse: Luzuko Mbane (m. 2005)
- Children: 2

Lusanda C. Sangoni (born 16 February 1979), popularly known as Lusanda Mbane, is a South African actress, radio personality, speaker and entrepreneur. She is best known for the roles in the television serials Scandal!, Muvhango, imbewu and generations.

== Personal life ==
Mbane was born on 16 May 1979 in Butterworth in the Eastern Cape, South Africa. She completed education from Clarendon Girls' High School in East London. Then in 1998, she attended to Technikon Witwatersrand and had a stint until 2000. After that, she completed the B.Com Marketing from University of South Africa (UNISA).

== Career ==
Before entering acting, she joined with many advertising campaigns such as Knorrox, Kellogg's (Chocos), Brand Power (Ponds), Rama, Milo, Dettol and McCain as the lead role. After that, she rendered her voice for other commercials such as Google, Edgars, KFC, DStv, the IDZ (Industrial Development Zone), SALGA, UIF, Enterprise, Blue Ribbon, Sanlam, African Bank and ECSA, among others. In 2009, she made television acting debut after joining with the SABC2 soap opera Muvhango. In the soapie, she played the cameo role as "Advocate Macheke". In 2010, she joined with the SABC1 soap opera Generations where she played the role "Naomi Malotana". Her role became very popular, where she continued to play the role until 2011.

In 2011, she made a guest role as "Joyce" in the eleventh season of the SABC1 drama series Soul City. After that, she joined with the SABC1 sitcom Abo Mzala and starred the role of "Zodwa". Even though the role became very popular, she quit from the role after first seasons, where Thembsie Matu played that role in second season. The year 2013 became a memorable year for Mbane, where she appeared in many soapies: in The Khumalos with the role of "MaKhumalo" until 2015, the role "Aliah" on the SABC1 drama series Tempy Pushas and in the third season of the Mzansi Magic soap opera Isibaya with a cameo role as "doctor". Apart from that, she performed and voiced in the South African Airways in-flight safety video in that year.

In 2016, she was invited to play the guest role of "Penney" in the second season of SABC1 romantic comedy series Dream World. Then, she joined with the third season of the SABC1 legal drama series Sokhulu & Partners. In the serial, she played the guest role as "Nobuhle Pasha". After that success, she played the recurring role of "Boniswa" in the e.tv soap opera Scandal! in 2016. She continued to play the role until 2021 and won the Outstanding Lead Actress award, at Royal Soapie awards. During this period, she also joined with second season of e.tv drama series Z'bondiwe with the role "Sis Puleng". While playing in the soapie Scandal!, she joined with another soapie Isibaya to play the recurring role of "Thembi Mdlalose" in both seasons six and seven. In 2021, she appeared in the etv. serial Imbewu.

Apart from acting, she is the Managing Director and Founder of the women empowerment movement "Zazi Zithande Zithembe" and recruitment company "Ellenina Professional Recruitment" since 2012 and 2008 respectively. Meanwhile, she produces and hosts the show on Tru FM. She is also a graduate of the Goldman Sachs 10 000 Women Program (GIBS) in Entrepreneurship.

== Filmography ==
Year	Film	Role	Genre	Ref.
2009	Muvhango	Advocate Macheke	TV series	
2010	Generations	Naomi Malotana	TV series	
2011	Abo Mzala	Zodwa	TV series	
2011	Soul City	Joyce	TV series	
2013	Tempy Pushas	Aliah	TV series	
2016	Dream World	Penney	TV series	
2016	Isibaya	Doctor/Thembi	TV series	
2016–2021	Scandal!	Boniswa Langa	TV series	
2016	Sokhulu & Partners	Nobuhle Pasha	TV series	
2016	Z'bondiwe	Sis Puleng	TV series	
2021 - 2022	Imbewu	Makhosazana	TV series	
2021	Mzali Wami	Joyce Khaphayi	TV series	
2023 - present	Smoke & Mirrors	Martha Mayekiso	TV series	
2023	1802: Love Defies Time	Nkosazana	TV series	
