= Brotherhood (Brazilian TV series) =

Brazilian crime drama television series

- Genre: Crime drama
- Created by: Pedro Morelli
- Directed by: Pedro Morelli
- Starring: Seu Jorge; Naruna Costa; Hermila Guedes; Lee Taylor
- Country of origin: Brazil
- Original language: Portuguese
- No. of seasons: 2
- No. of episodes: 14

Production
- Producers: Andrea Barata Ribeiro; Bel Berlinck
- Cinematography: Adrian Teijido
- Editors: Sabrina Wilkins; Paulão de Barros; Rodrigo Menecucci; João Menna Barreto
- Production company: O2 Filmes

Original release
- Network: Netflix
- Release: 25 October 2019 – 11 May 2022

Related
- Umthetho

Brotherhood (Portuguese: Irmandade) is a Brazilian crime drama television series that premiered on Netflix on October 25, 2019. On February 22, 2021, the series was renewed for a second series which premiered on May 11, 2022.

== Premise ==
In São Paulo in the mid-1990s, Cristina (Naruna Costa), an honest and devoted lawyer, discovers that her estranged brother Edson (Seu Jorge) is imprisoned and leads a criminal faction known as the "Brotherhood." She is forced by police to become an informant and work against her brother, who has not seen her for years. By infiltrating the Brotherhood in a risky and dangerous mission, she comes into contact with her darkest side and begins to question her own notions of justice.

== Cast ==
- Dion Andias
- Naruna Costa as Cristina
- Seu Jorge as Edson
- Hermila Guedes as Darlene
- Lee Taylor as Ivan
- Danilo Grangheia as Andrade
- Pedro Wagner as Carniça
- Wesley Guimarães as Marcel
- João Humberto Vancini

== Episodes ==
Season	Episodes	Originally released
1	8	October 25, 2019
2	6	May 11, 2022

=== Season 1 (2019) ===
No. overall	No. in season	Title	Directed by	Written by	Original release date
1	1	"Right is Right" (O Certo é o Certo)	Unknown	Unknown	October 25, 2019
2	2	"I Got You" (Pode Confiar)	Unknown	Unknown	October 25, 2019
3	3	"Rat Trap" (Tribunal do crime)	Unknown	Unknown	October 25, 2019
4	4	"One-Way Ticket" (Passagem só de ida)	Unknown	Unknown	October 25, 2019
5	5	"What Brothers Are For" (Irmão Ajuda Irmão)	Unknown	Unknown	October 25, 2019
6	6	"Decision" (Decisão)	Aly Muritiba	Unknown	October 25, 2019
7	7	"Blood on Your Hands" (Sangue nas mãos)	Unknown	Unknown	October 25, 2019
8	8	"My Word is My Bond" (Palavra num faz curva)	Pedro Morelli	Unknown	October 25, 2019

=== Season 2 (2022) ===
No. overall	No. in season	Title	Directed by	Written by	Original release date
9	1	"Ties" (Nós)	Unknown	Unknown	May 11, 2022
10	2	"Just Dust" (Só o pó)	Unknown	Unknown	May 11, 2022
11	3	"Two Weights, Two Measures" (Um peso, duas medidas)	Unknown	Unknown	May 11, 2022
12	4	"Like Garbage" (Que nem lixo)	Unknown	Unknown	May 11, 2022
13	5	"Sentence" (Sentença)	Unknown	Unknown	May 11, 2022
14	6	"Siblings" (Irmãos)	Unknown	Unknown	May 11, 2022

== Marketing ==
The first full trailer for the series was released by Netflix on September 19, 2019.
