= Prince Grootboom =

South African actor (born 1998)

- Born: Nthuthuzelo Prince Grootboom; 1 July 1998 (age 28); Gqeberha, Eastern Cape, South Africa
- Other name: Prince Beez
- Occupation: Actor
- Years active: 2021–present
- Spouse: Rorisang Mohapi (m. 2025)

Nthuthuzelo Prince Grootboom (born 1 July 1998) is a South African actor. He is best known for playing starring roles in notable television shows include Inimba (2025–present) as Mawethu Sonjica and 1802: Love Defies Time (2023–2024) as Melisizwe.

== Early life ==
Nthuthuzelo Prince Grootbom was born and raised in Gqeberha, Eastern Cape, South Africa, on 1 July 1998 to a Xhosa descent family.

== Career ==
Grootboom made his television debut in 2021 in as Netflix drama series Jiva! season 1 playing the supporting role of Makhekhe. In 2023, he upgraded his acting career, when he played the lead role in a triller series Fatal Seduction as Jacob Tau. The same year, he played the lead role of Melisizwe in 1Magictelenovela 1802: Love Defies Time. He also appeared in SABC 1 soapie opera uBettina Wethu playing the supporting role of Xhanti Mayiza.

In 2025, Grootboom became one of the greatest actors in South Africa reported by GQ South Africa magazine. He played the starring role of Mawethu Phakade in Mzansi Magic telenovela Inimba. In May 2026, he made his debut in a film 180 playing the lead role of Zak. He was ranked a 5 star performance rating for his role of Zak in Africa Ranks and featured in a magazine cover.

== Personal life ==
Grootboom is married with a fellow actress Rorisang Mohapi after being engaged in 2025 October. Beside acting, he is a professional dancer and practicing boxer.

== Filmography ==
=== Film ===
Year	Title	Role	Notes
2026	180	Zak	Lead role

=== Television ===
Year	Title	Role	Notes
2021	Jiva!	Makhekhe	Supporting role, season 1
2023–present	Fatal Seduction	Jacob Tau	Lead role, season 1–3
2023	uBettina Wethu	Xhanti Mayiza	Supporting role, season 4
2023–2024	1802: Love Defies Time	Melisizwe	Lead role, season 1
2025–present	Inimba	Mawethu	Main role, season 1–2
2026	Blank Slate	Mr Tswete	Supporting, season 1
