= Zenobia Kloppers =

Namibian–South African actress, singer and voice artist

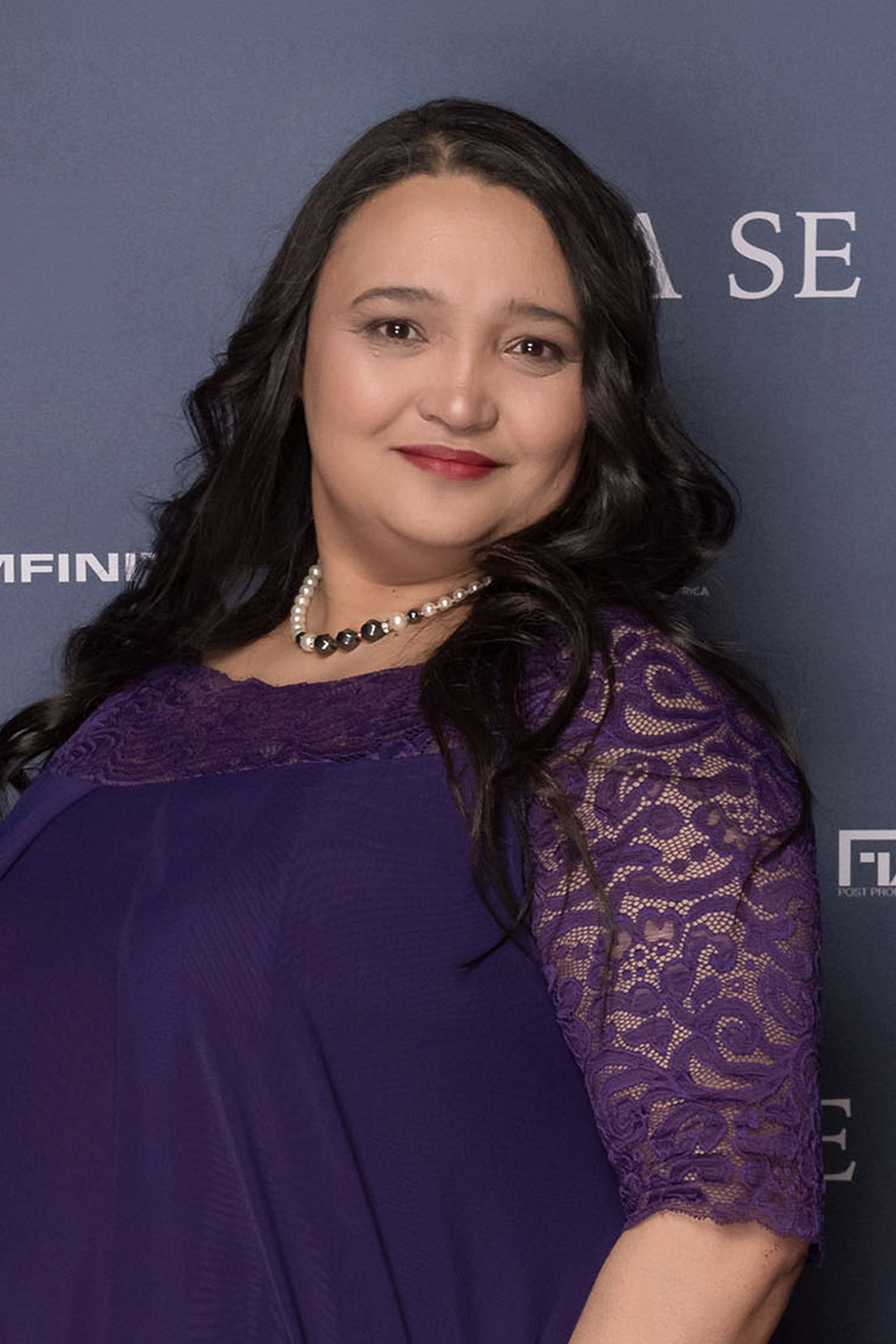
- Kloppers at the premiere of Fiela se Kind in 2019
- Born: Windhoek, Namibia
- Education: University of Cape Town; Stellenbosch University
- Occupations: Actress, singer, voice artist
- Years active: 2000s–present
- Known for: Fiela se Kind (2019 film), The Wheel of Time
- Website: www.zenobiakloppers.com

Zenobia Kloppers is a Namibian–South African actress, singer and voice artist who works across film, television, theatre and radio.

She is known for her performance as Fiela Komoetie in Fiela se Kind (2019), for which she received Best Actress nominations at the South African Film and Television Awards and the Silwerskerm Film Festival, and was also nominated for Best Actress at the Africa Movie Academy Awards.

In 2025, she appeared as Amico Nagoyin in the third season of the Prime Video fantasy series The Wheel of Time, a role described in South African and Namibian press as marking her global television debut.

== Early life and education ==
Kloppers was born in Windhoek, Namibia, and grew up in Khomasdal. The Namibian profiled her in 2019 as coming from a well-known Khomasdal family and reported that she attended Gammams Primary School, Holy Cross Convent and later St Paul's College.

Her early artistic development included classical voice training, and she studied singing in South Africa before pursuing formal training at tertiary level. She trained in acting and music in South Africa at the University of Cape Town Drama School and Music College and the Stellenbosch University Conservatory. ESAT records that she obtained a Performer’s Licentiate in Music (Opera and Lieder) and also holds a Bachelor of Social Sciences (BSocSci) degree.

== Career ==
=== Early career: music and theatre ===
Kloppers began her professional career in theatre and music. Her early career spanned opera, musical theatre, cabaret and educational theatre. She performed in opera productions including Die Zauberflöte, Il matrimonio segreto, Hänsel und Gretel, and The Impresario, alongside a range of stage and music theatre productions.

Her musical theatre work includes productions such as Antjie Somers, Oos Wes Tuis Bes, Ghoema, and Spice Drum Beat: Ghoema. In Ghoema, a production by David Kramer and Taliep Petersen exploring Cape Town’s musical heritage, she performed as Dina at the Baxter Theatre in Cape Town. ESAT records that the production later ran internationally under the title Spice Drum Beat: Ghoema, including a London run at the Tricycle Theatre.

For her work in Ghoema, she was nominated for a Naledi Theatre Award in the category Best Performance in a Musical (Female).

Her cabaret work includes productions such as Iets Jazzy & Iets Kabbaretterig, Love for Sale / Love for Soul, Scrawl, Where Corals Lie, Woman in Love, Black & Blue, Broadway Babies, and Kaapse Kabaret.

She also portrayed female leads in productions engaging with South African and Namibian history, heritage and identity, including Sarah, Shirley, Goodness and Mercy, and stage adaptations of Fiela se Kind. Her debut play, Klarabelle gaan Kaap toe (2002), explored questions of ancestry, heritage and coloured identity. According to ESAT, it premiered at Artscape in Cape Town in 2002 and was later staged at the KKNK, Aardklop and the Baxter Studio.

In addition to stage work, Kloppers built a substantial presence in radio drama. She performed in productions for Radio Sonder Grense (RSG), including the title role in Die Swerfjare van Poppie Nongena, an adaptation of Elsa Joubert’s novel. In a review of the production, Robyn Sassen wrote that "there is a magnificence in Kloppers’ interpretation" of the lead character and described the radio rendition as "devastatingly fine".

=== Breakthrough with Fiela se Kind ===
Kloppers gained wider recognition for her portrayal of Fiela Komoetie in Brett Michael Innes's 2019 film adaptation of Fiela se Kind. The film screened internationally, including at the Tallinn Black Nights Film Festival, where Screen Daily described the film as bristling "with moral outrage" and singled out Kloppers' "dignified performance" as Fiela.

For the role, she received Best Actress nominations at the 2019 Silwerskerm Film Festival, the 2020 South African Film and Television Awards, and the 2020 Africa Movie Academy Awards.

=== Television and screen work ===
Following Fiela se Kind, Kloppers appeared in South African and international television productions including Suidooster, Arendsvlei, Die Sentrum, Blood & Water, Dinge van 'n Kind, Spinners, Unseen, Recipes for Love and Murder, Die Nuusmakers and Die Kantoor, the South African Afrikaans adaptation of The Office. Her film credits include The Endless River, Noem My Skollie (Call Me Thief), Bhai's Café, Lucky Fish, Finding Optel, and Khaki Fever.

=== Breakout with The Wheel of Time ===
In 2025, Kloppers appeared in the third season of Prime Video's global epic fantasy series The Wheel of Time as Amico Nagoyin. Coverage of the season premiere in Collider identified Amico as one of the Black Ajah sisters involved in the White Tower storyline.

=== Directing and other creative work ===
In addition to acting, Kloppers also works as a director and screenwriter. In 2023, The Namibian reported on her move into directing with the short films Riel and Helmhart.

Riel screened at the 2023 Durban International Film Festival. The film later received an Africa Movie Academy Award nomination for Best Short Film and won Best Short Film at the South African Independent Film Festival. It also won the Prix du film court musical at the Pierre Cardin Festival in 2023.

Helmhart premiered at the Silwerskerm Film Festival, which described it as the festival's "first-ever ghost story and Gothic romance".

Kloppers also served as associate director on Sara Baartman – the Opera (2022), directed by Janice Honeyman and presented at the Baxter Theatre Centre.

== Selected filmography ==
=== Film ===
Year	Title	Role	Notes
2026	180	Grace	
2026	Hive	Frances	
2025	Lucky Fish	Sheila Reddy	
2025	Finding Optel	Aunty Doreen	
2025	Khaki Fever	Daniel's mother	Voice role
2022	Liz Virrie Lewe	Tristana	Television film
2022	Woke	Dr Newman	Television film
2019	Fiela se Kind	Fiela Komoetie	
2019	Bhai's Café	Mrs Arendse	
2015	Noem My Skollie (Call Me Thief)	Smokkie Diva	Uncredited
2015	The Endless River	Teller	

=== Television ===
Year	Title	Role	Notes
2026	Die Kantoor	Veronica	1 episode
2025	The Wheel of Time	Amico Nagoyin	3 episodes, season 3
2025	Die Nuusmakers	Sakina Solomons	2 episodes
2025	Recipes for Love and Murder	Mrs Jackson	1 episode
2025	Unseen	Florrie	1 episode
2024	The Morning After	Aunt Sara	1 episode
2023	Spinners	Samantha	8 episodes
2022	Dinge van 'n Kind	Rachel	6 episodes
2019–2021	Arendsvlei	Emily	17 episodes
2021	Die Sentrum	Lucinda Jackson	8 episodes
2021	Blood & Water	Denise Dzana	1 episode
2019–2021	Suidooster	Rebecca Thuli	29 episodes
2020	Sara se Geheim	Tristana	2 episodes
2020	Projek Dina	Margie	1 episode
2014	Amaza	Fatima Ibrahim	9 episodes
2013	Thomas@	Joey	1 episode

=== Writing and directing ===
Year	Title	Role	Notes
2023	Riel	Co-writer, director	Premiered at Durban International Film Festival
2023	Helmhart	Co-writer, director	Premiered at Silwerskerm Film Festival
2022	Sara Baartman – the Opera	Associate director	Baxter Theatre Centre

== Awards and nominations ==
- Naledi Theatre Awards – Nominee, Best Performance in a Musical (Female), Ghoema
- Silwerskerm Film Festival – Nominee, Best Actress, Fiela se Kind
- South African Film and Television Awards – Nominee, Best Actress – Feature Film, Fiela se Kind
- Africa Movie Academy Awards – Nominee, Best Actress in a Leading Role, Fiela se Kind
- South African Independent Film Festival – Winner, Best Short Film, Riel
- Africa Movie Academy Awards – Nominee, Best Short Film, Riel
