= Unathi Mkhize =

South African actor (born 1998)

- Born: Unathi Will Mkhize; 23 September 1998 (age 28); Umzimkhulu, South Africa
- Occupations: Actor; influencer; model
- Years active: 2018–present
- Notable work: The River; Ithonga

Unathi Will Mkhize (born 23 September 1998) is a South African actor, influencer and model. He is best known for his starring role of Nkanyiso Hlophe in 1Magic popular telenovela The River and for playing the role of Lethokuhle Dladla in Mzansi Magic telenovela Ithonga.

== Life and career ==
Unathi Mkhize was born on September 23, 1998, in Umzimkhulu, KwaZulu-Natal and is one of Zulu descent among the Nguni people. He obtained his Honours degree from AFDA Film Academy, where he studied filmmaking and directing.

Mkhize started his acting career in 2018 on Mzansi Magic short local drama films, where he had guest-starring roles. He appeared on shows such as Siyaya, Umhlaba, The List, and NightMan's Taxi before landing his first credited TV role on the e.tv crime drama series Isiphindiselo playing the role of Vusimuzi in 2021.

In 2022, Mkhize starred on the 1Magic telenovela The River as Nkanyiso Hlophe, alongside Bheki Mkhwane, Brenda Mhlongo, Vuyo Biyela, and Tina Dlathu. He then appeared in the short film Nefarious Creatures as Lon. By 2023, he played Ntsika on the 1Magic comedy series Roomies. The same year he made his Netflix debut starring as Njabulo Adesina in Blood Legacy.

In 2025, he starred in the Mzansi Magic comedy drama Levels playing the starring role of Sihle and had a supporting role as Lethokuhle Dladla on Ithonga.

== Filmography ==
=== Film ===
Year	Title	Role
2022	Nefarious Creatures	Lon
2022	Feluthando	Clive Maphumulo

=== Television ===
Year	Title	Role
2021	Isiphindiselo	Vusimuzi Biyela
2022–2023	The River	Nkanyiso Hlophe
2023	Roomies	Ntsika Mabaso
2023	Blood Legacy	Njabulo Adesina
2025	Levels	Sihle
2025–2026	Ithonga	Lethokuhle Dladla
2026–present	Nyala O...	Mondli Dlamini
