= Riding with Sugar =

2020 film

- Directed by: Sunu Gonera
- Written by: Sunu Gonera
- Produced by: Sunu Gonera; Helena Spring; Anna Walton
- Starring: Charles Mnene; Hakeem Kae-Kazim; Simona Brown; Hlayani Junior Mabasa; Paballo Koza; Neo Munhenga; Shelley Nicole; Brendon Daniels
- Cinematography: Rory O’Grady
- Edited by: Gordon Midgley
- Production companies: Shekinah Tribe; Helena Spring Films
- Distributed by: Netflix
- Release date: 27 November 2020
- Country: South Africa
- Language: English

Riding with Sugar is a South African drama film directed, written and produced by Sunu Gonera. The film stars Charles Mnene, Hakeem Kae-Kazim, Simona Brown, Hlayani Junior Mabasa, Paballo Koza and Neo Munhenga.

== Cast ==
- Charles Mnene as Joshua
- Hakeem Kae-Kazim as Mambo
- Simona Brown as Olivia
- Hlayani Junior Mabasa as Rusty
- Paballo Koza as Vetkoek
- Neo Munhenga as Femi
- Shelley Nicole as Lead dancer
- Brendon Daniels as Green Eyes

== Production ==
In November 2018, it was revealed that the film began production. The film was shot in Cape Town, South Africa.

== Release ==
Riding with Sugar was released on 27 November 2020 on Netflix.
