= 180 (2026 film) =

2026 South African film

- Directed by: Alex Yazbek
- Written by: Alex Yazbek
- Produced by: Layla Swart
- Starring: Prince Grootboom; Warren Masemola; Noxolo Dlamini; Fana Mokoena; Desmond Dube; Danica De La Rey Jones; Bongile Mantsai
- Cinematography: Fahema Hendricks
- Edited by: Nicholas Costaras; Nkosinathi Sifunda; Jolene van Antwerp
- Music by: Chris Letcher
- Production company: Quizzical Pictures
- Distributed by: Netflix
- Release date: 17 April 2026
- Running time: 94 minutes
- Country: South Africa
- Languages: English; Afrikaans; Xhosa; Tswana

180 is a 2026 South African thriller film produced by Layla Swart and Quizzical Pictures airing on Netflix on 17 April 2026. It was written and directed by Alex Yazbek. The film stars Prince Grootboom, Noxolo Dlamini, Warren Masemola, Desmond Dube and Fana Mokoena.

== Premise ==
The film follows a severe road rage incident involving corrupt taxi operators, Zak, a reformed gangster trying to build a legitimate life. As the authorities fail to act due to systemic police corruption, Zak is drawn back into the violent underworld he sought to leave behind. His quest for personal vengeance forces him to navigate the dangerous power dynamics and criminal networks operating within the local South African taxi industry.

== Cast ==
- Prince Grootboom as Zak Sigcawu
- Warren Masemola as Lerumo
- Noxolo Dlamini as Portia
- Fana Mokoena as Eezy
- Desmond Dube as Floyd
- Danica De La Rey Jones as Layla
- Bongile Mantsai as Zuko
- Mpiloenhle Sithebe as Mandla
- Zenobia Kloppers as Grace
- Makhaola Ndebele as Shoes
- John Ncamane as Fenya
- Kabelo Thai as Karwas

== Release ==
The film premiered on Netflix on 17 April 2026.

== Reception ==
The film quickly rose to the #1 global position on the platform's movie charts and secured the top spot in 60 countries. And top ten in 93 countries. During its first weeks of availability, it collected over 37 million completed views, outpacing major studio releases to become one of the streamer's major breakout hits of the year. 180 is also No. 3 on Netflix's Top 10 movies in the United States.
