= Heart of the Hunter (film) =

- Directed by: Mandlakayise W. Dube
- Written by: Deon Meyer
- Screenplay by: William Gobbler
- Based on: The Novel "The Heart of The Hunter" by Deon Meyer
- Produced by: Deon Meyer
- Starring: Bonko Khoza; Connie Ferguson; Masasa Mbangeni; Tim Theron; Nicole Fortuin; Sisanda Henna
- Production company: Deon Meyer Films
- Distributed by: Netflix
- Release date: 29 March 2024
- Running time: 1:47:37
- Country: South Africa
- Languages: English isiXhosa
- Budget: $2 Million
- Box office: $4.78 Million

Heart of the Hunter is a 2024 South African spy thriller film directed by Mandla Dube. It stars Bonko Khoza, Connie Ferguson and Nicole Fortuin. The film is based on Deon Meyer's novel of the same name. Deon Meyer is also the co-writer of the film along with Willem Grobler.

== Plot ==
Zuko Khumalo (Bonko Khoza) is a retired South African assassin when he get call from the daughter of an old friend Johnny Klein (Peter Butler) who has been kidnapped while uncovering a dangerous conspiracy at the heart of the South African government.

== Cast ==
- Bonko Khoza as Zuko Khumalo
- Connie Ferguson as Molebogeng Kwena
- Tim Theron as Tiger De Klerk
- Nicole Fortuin as Naledi Gumede
- Milan Murray as Beth Manning
- Masasa Mbangeni as Maline Mambi
- Boleng Mogosti as Phakamile Mambi
- Sisanda Henna as Dazza Mtina
- Peter Butler as Johhny Klein
- Deon Cotzee as Mike Bressler
- Wanda Banda as Alison Baloyi
- Connie Chiume as Thandiwe Make a
- Dann-Jacques Mouton as Sergeant Nervill Daniels
- Siya Mayola as Lawrence Rapulana

In addition, Natalie Walsh, Stephen Erasmus, Grant Ross, Ndalo Mshilwa, Gert Uys and Kabelo Chalatsane appeared in the film.

== Release ==
The film was released on Netflix on 29 March 2024.

== Reception ==
The film mostly received negative reviews from film critics. It holds a 67% approval rating on review aggregator website Rotten Tomatoes. Mrinal Rajaram of Cinema Express gave it a rating of 3/5 said while Lori Meek of Ready Steady Cut gave it a rating of 2.5/3 and called it "Fast-Paced Action, But An Overly Complicated Story".
