= Given Stuurman =

South African actor

- Born: Given Mahlatse Stuurman; Johannesburg, South Africa
- Other name: PapiAction
- Occupations: Actor, presenter
- Years active: 2006–present

Given Mahlatse Stuurman, also known by his trade name PapiAction, is a South African actor. Started as a child artist, Stuurman is best known for his roles in the popular television serials and films Invictus, Straight Outta Benoni, Scout's Safari and Scandal!.

== Personal life ==
He was born and raised in Johannesburg, South Africa. Although, he went on to study sound engineering at the Academy of Sound Engineering in Auckland Park, he later quit from it.

He is married and is a father of one daughter, who was born in 2020.

== Career ==
He is one of the most popular child artists in South African in mid 2000s. In 2006, he was selected for the role 'Xolisi 'Speedy' Ncebe' in the television series Tshisa telecast on SABC1. The series became highly popular where he continued to play the role until 2012. Then he played the role 'Medupe' in the television sitcom Gauteng Maboneng in 2011. In 2009, he joined the cast of television serial Scandal! and played one of the lead role of 'Kgosi'. The series become highly popular aired for more than 10 years.

In 2005, he made his debut cinema role in the film Straight Outta Benoni where he played a supportive role of 'Manziman's brother'. In 2006, he appeared in the home movie König Otto. In 2009, he starred in the blockbuster Invictus with a minor role 'Township Kid'. In 2017, he became a regular cast in the television serial Shuga. In the serial, he played the role 'Reggie'.

== Filmography ==
| Year | Film | Role | Genre | Ref. |
|---|---|---|---|---|
| 2003 | Scout's Safari | | TV series | |
| 2005 | Straight Outta Benoni | Manziman's brother | Film | |
| 2006 | Tshisa | Xolisi 'Speedy' Ncebe | TV series | |
| 2006 | König Otto | Mbugu | TV movie | |
| 2009 | Invictus | Township Kid | Film | |
| 2009 | Scandal! | Kgosi Legae | TV series | |
| 2017–19 | Shuga | Reggie | TV series | |
| 2021 | Jiva! | Samukelo "Samu" | TV series | |
| 2026 | Umthetho | Sphelele Dlamini | Main role, 7 episodes | |
