= Kiya & the Kimoja Heroes =

Animated television series

- Genre: Comedy; Action-Adventure; Superhero; Martial arts Magical girl
- Created by: Kelly Dillon; Marc Dey; Robert Vargas
- Directed by: Pierre-Alain Chartier; Cédric Chauveau
- Voices of: Dineo du Toit; Ian Ho; Fontina Fourtounes
- Composers: Thibault Kientz Agyeman; James "BKS" Edjouma
- Countries of origin: South Africa; Canada; France
- Original language: English
- No. of seasons: 1
- No. of episodes: 26

Production
- Executive producers: Marc Dey; Kelly Dillon; Olivier Dumont; Anthony Silverston
- Running time: 24 minutes (2 12-minute segments)
- Production companies: Triggerfish Animation Studios; Entertainment One; Frog Box Productions; TeamTO; Disney Branded Television

Original release
- Network: France 4 (France); Disney Junior (Worldwide)
- Release: March 22, 2023 – February 9, 2024

Kiya & the Kimoja Heroes is a children's animated television series created by Kelly Dillon, Marc Dey and Robert Vargas, and aired on Disney Junior from March 22, 2023 to February 9, 2024. The series is co-produced by Triggerfish Animation Studios, Frog Box Productions, Entertainment One and TeamTO, with the participation of France Télévisions and Disney Junior.

== Premise ==
The series is set in a fictional African city called Kimoja City, and centers on three best friends named Kiya, Jay, and Motsie. Whenever there is a problem in town, the trio heads to their headquarters called Crystal Eyes where they transform into superheroes. The friends can also transform outside of Crystal Eyes by putting on their bandanas.

== Characters ==
=== Main ===
- Kiya (voiced by Dineo du Toit) is the leader of the Kimoja Heroes. Her gadget is a baton that creates energy rings that can hold things they surround. She is seven years old.
- Jay (voiced by Ian Ho) is Motsie's older stepbrother and one of Kiya's friends and fellow superheroes. His gadget is a guitar that creates energy blocks that can be used as barriers and has the ability to fly.
- Motsie (voiced by Fontina Fourtounes) is Jay's younger stepsister and one of Kiya's friends and fellow superheroes. Her interests are roller skating and building high-tech tools. Her gadget is a zip tool that is used to grab and swing on things. She is also equipped with special nets for trapping things.

=== Recurring ===
- Daddy Jo (voiced by Bonko Khoza) is Kiya's widowed father and the owner of a food truck.
- Bra Jabu is the owner of a produce stand.
- MC Harmony is the events coordinator of Kimoja City.
- Aunty Busi is a woman who is conscious about her hair.
- Gogo Flo is Kiya's maternal grandmother.
- Shandu is Jay and Motsie's mother who works as a hairstylist.
- Marianne is Jay and Motsie's other mother who works as a safari park worker.

=== Villains ===
- Zane/Acrobrat (voiced by Christian Campbell) is a young Kimojian who turns into Acrobrat when he doesn't get his way. As Acrobrat, he is athletic as his alter-ego suggests, and can roll into a ball to travel faster.
- Haddy Collider (voiced by Maja Vujicic) is a mechanical supervillain who creates gadgets to stop the Kimoja Heroes.
- Galactoslug (voiced by Cory Doran) is Haddy's sidekick and pet slug.
- Primadonna (voiced by Tumelo Mosese) is a supervillain with telekinesis that wreaks havoc when something goes wrong.

== Episodes ==
No.	Title	Written by	Original release date	Prod. code	U.S. viewers (millions)
1	"Kiya and the Kite Monster"	Robert Vargas	March 22, 2023	101	0.16
1	"Cosmic Catastrophe"	Christian De Vita	March 22, 2023	101	0.16
2	"Zero to Hero"	Tshepo Moche & Raffaella Della Donne	March 23, 2023 (Note: This episode was first released on Disney+ on March 22, 2023.)	102	N/A
2	"Take a Step Back"	Eric Noto	March 23, 2023	102	N/A
3	"Kiya's Potluck"	Khadidiatou Diouf	March 24, 2023	103	0.14
3	"Musical Mash-Up"	Léa Lespagnol	March 24, 2023	103	0.14
4	"Going Solo in a Snowglobe"	Christian De Vita	March 31, 2023 (Note: This episode was first released on DisneyNow on March 22, 2023.)	104	N/A
4	"Revolting Robots"	Anaïs Lebeau & Roman Van Liemt	March 31, 2023	104	N/A
5	"A Little Birdy Told Me"	Justine Cheynet	April 7, 2023	105	N/A
5	"The Night of 1000 Lights"	Anaïs Lebeau	April 7, 2023	105	N/A
6	"Fight or Flight"	Tshepo Moche & Raffaella Della Donne	April 14, 2023	106	0.16
6	"Clash of the Kora"	Franck Yaya	April 14, 2023	106	0.16
7	"Kiya and the Boombastic"	Marc Dey	April 21, 2023	107	N/A
7	"Acroboo!"	Khadidiatou Diouf	April 21, 2023	107	N/A
8	"Smelly Business"	Khadidiatou Diouf	May 12, 2023	108	N/A
8	"Kiya's Monster Movie Night"	Robert Vargas	May 12, 2023	108	N/A
9	"King of Pranks"	Christian De Vita	May 26, 2023	109	0.12
9	"Bugging Out"	Christian De Vita	May 26, 2023	109	0.12
10	"Ready Set Freeze"	Léa Lespagnol	June 2, 2023	110	N/A
10	"Honey Camp"	Khadidiatou Diouf	June 2, 2023	110	N/A
11	"Jay and the Super Fans"	Baptiste Renard	June 23, 2023	111	0.12
11	"We Heart Art"	Pierre-Gilles Stehr	June 23, 2023	111	0.12
12	"Primadonna's Detective Agency"	Jessica Kedward and Kirsty Peart	July 7, 2023	112	N/A
12	"Day of the Slugs"	Simon Raynaud	July 7, 2023	112	N/A
13	"Galactoslug Gets His Groove"	Jessica Kedward and Kirsty Peart	July 21, 2023	113	N/A
14	"The Primadonna Puzzle"	Kelly Dillon	August 4, 2023	114	0.13
14	"Fear of Mission Out"	Khadidiatou Diouf	August 4, 2023	114	0.13
15	"Stealing the Spotlight"	Fernando Worcel and Nicolas Sedel	August 25, 2023	115	0.14
15	"Duel of the Inventors"	Christian De Vita	August 25, 2023	115	0.14
16	"Primadonna's Bodyguards"	Jean De Loriol	September 1, 2023	117	0.13
16	"The Squish Bouncer Bandit"	Marc Dey and Raffaella Della Donne	September 1, 2023	117	0.13
17	"Double Trouble!"	Fernando Worcel and Nicolas Sedel	September 8, 2023	118	0.11
17	"Size Me Up"	Alain Vallejo	September 8, 2023	118	0.11
18	"It Takes a Kimoja Village"	Anaïs Lebeau	October 20, 2023	119	0.13
18	"Motsie's Space Race"	Fernando Worcel and Nicolas Sedel	October 20, 2023	119	0.13
19	"Who's Got Talent"	Fernando Worcel and Nicolas Sedel	November 24, 2023	116	0.09
19	"Snow in Kimoja"	Franck Yaya	November 24, 2023	116	0.09
20	"Kimoja Go!"	Jean De Loriol and Christian De Vita	December 15, 2023	120	0.10
21	"Chikobrat"	Christian De Vita	January 5, 2024	121	0.12
21	"Jay and the Invisibility Ray"	Jessica Kedward and Kirsty Peart	January 5, 2024	121	0.12
22	"Kimoja Friendship Sleepover"	Simon Raynaud	January 12, 2024 (Note: This episode was first released on Disney+ on January 10, 2024.)	122	N/A
22	"Rise of the Blob"	Charles-Henri Moarbes	January 12, 2024	122	N/A
23	"The Chair of Honour"	Anaïs Lebeau	January 19, 2024	123	0.13
23	"Acrobrat's Fun House"	Baptiste Renard	January 19, 2024	123	0.13
24	"Motsie and the Baby Bush Babies"	Léa Lespagnol	January 26, 2024	124	0.09
24	"UniWolf"	Fernando Worcel and Nicolas Sedel	January 26, 2024	124	0.09
25	"Daddy Jo's Dance Down"	Jessica Kedward and Kirsty Peart	February 2, 2024	125	N/A
25	"The Groovier Mover"	Cédric Chauveau	February 2, 2024	125	N/A
26	"Kimoja Crystal New Year"	Christian De Vita	February 9, 2024	126	N/A

== Production ==
On February 25, 2021, it was announced that Entertainment One had greenlit Kiya, a series about a young superhero and her two best friends, set to launch in multiple markets globally in 2023. Kiya's world features a diverse cast of characters inspired by the varied landscape, natural beauty and culture of Southern Africa. The series is based on an original concept from South African-based production company Triggerfish and developed for television by Frogbox and eOne.

On June 17, 2021, it was announced that Disney Junior and Disney+ had picked up both broadcasting and streaming rights for the series, now titled Kiya & the Kimoja Heroes.

== Broadcast ==
Kiya & the Kimoja Heroes premiered on Disney Junior on March 22, 2023, with the first three episodes being released on Disney+ earlier that day.

Kiya And The Kimoja Heroes (C) 2021 Frog Box SAS/Entertainment One UK Limited/Walt Disney EMEA Productions Limited.

All Rights Reserved.
