= Nelisiwe Sibiya =

South African actress and singer (born 1992)

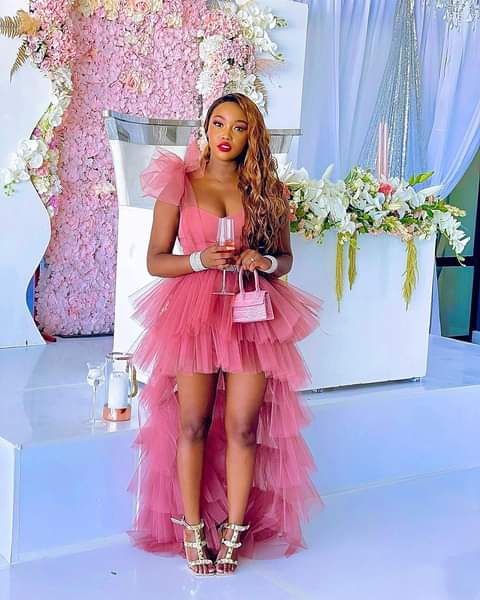
- Sibiya in 2022
- Born: Nelisiwe Faith Sibiya; 13 September 1992 (age 34); Johannesburg, South Africa
- Other name: Faith
- Education: Tshwane University of Technology
- Occupations: Actress; singer; radio presenter
- Years active: 2018–present
- Notable work: Durban Gen; Ithonga

Nelisiwe Faith Sibiya (born 13 September 1992) is a South African actress, singer and radio presenter. She is best known lead role in the e.tv television series Durban Gen as Dr Mbali Mthethwa and Mzansi Magic telenovela Ithonga as Zamahlabo Ntanzi. She released an African cultured music called "Mama ka Bafana" in 2016 that went viral and has been Lockdown theme song.

== Early life ==
Sibiya was born on 13 September 1992, in Johannesburg, South Africa. She grew up with her sister and mother. Her father was shot dead when she was 8 years old in front of them. They lived with an uncle and an aunt, but later left the place after her sister and herself were sexually abused and one of the abuses was committed by her uncle.

In January 2015, she enrolled to Tshwane University of Technology to study Musical Studies. Later, she got a bursary for the remaining two years. In 2016, her mother died before the graduation.

== Career ==
Her mother came from a family of singers. With the help of her sister, Nelisiwe started her singing career. After her sister's death, she joined her high school choir. During this period in the choir, she received choral and classical training. Her first major playback singing came through the prison serial Lockdown with the theme song "Mama Ka Bafana" in 2018. Then in 2020, she played the lead role of Dr Mbali Mthethwa in the e.tv medical drama telenovela Durban Gen. For her role, she won the award for the Best Actress in Africa by the Zikomo Awards in 2021.

In 2023, she appeared in Mzansi Magic television series Umkhokha: The Curse as Nompendulo. In November 2024, she debuted on etv Scandal! playing the character of Sanda a single mother to a teenage boy Khumo. She became the radio presenter at Gagasi FM. She bagged the lead in a new telenovela Ithonga as Zamahlabo Ntanzi in 2025.

== Filmography ==
Year	Film	Role
2016	Lockdown	Prisoner
2020	Durban Gen	Dr Mbali Mthethwa
2023	Umkhokha	Nompendulo
2024	Scandal!	Sanda
2025	Ithonga	Zamahlobo Ntanzi

2026Land Of Mills And Money Phiwe Simelane -Mguni
