= Our Perfect Wedding =

- Also known as: Our Perfect Wedding Mzansi; OPW
- Genre: Reality Television
- Presented by: Khanyisa Titus / Nomsa Buthelezi / LaConco
- Country of origin: South Africa
- Original language: Various
- No. of episodes: 500

Production
- Running time: 60 minutes
- Production company: Connect TV

Original release
- Network: Mzansi Magic

Related
- Date My Family

Our Perfect Wedding is a South African wedding television show on Mzansi Magic DStv. Our Perfect Wedding is produced by Connect TV and hosted by Thembisa Mdoda.

The show started in 2011 with guest stars Tumi Morake, Jessica Nkosi and NkwaNkwa.

== Seasons ==
=== Season 2 ===
Our perfect wedding has up to 10 seasons

== Plot ==
OPW is about South African weddings in Johannesburg, Pretoria and Cape Town. And it gives you an idea on how to pick a dress or a suit, cakes, decor and cars.

== International ==
The reality show appears in Africa, and international countries like China, Brazil in Lifetime TV. It has 1,3 million international views and in Africa it has 5,2 million on its first season.

== Presenters ==
=== Current ===
- Vele Manenje
- Nomsa Buthelezi

=== Past ===
- Jessica Nkosi
- Thuli Thabethe
- Tumi Morake
- Brenda Ngxoli
- NkwaNkwa
- Ayanda Mpama
- Phumeza Mdabe
- Thembisa Mdoda–Nxumalo
- Kayise Nqula
- Anele Mdoda

=== Guest ===
- Minnie Dlamini
- Stella Ndlovu
- Asipho Sethu
- Bonang Matheba (guest judge)

=== Presenter Search ===
The presenter search of Our Perfect Wedding took place in Durban and Cape Town, it also aired on television on Thursday, October 2017 on DSTV channel 161 Mzansi Magic.

A second episode of our OPW Presenter Search aired on Mzansi Magic in Durban and it is all across Africa in Africa Digital. On Thursday a winner was announced to be the winner will primer at January 2018.

- Mbali Nkosi
- Terry Pheto

== Accolades ==
Year	Award	Category
2015	South African Film and Television Awards	Best Presenter
