= Bonko Khoza =

South African actor (born 1991)

- Born: Bonko Cosmo Khoza; 13 August 1991 (age 35); Johannesburg, South Africa
- Other name: BK Khoza
- Education: National School of Arts
- Occupations: actor; director; Executive producer
- Years active: 2021-present
- Known for: The Wife as Mqhele Zulu
- Notable work: Ithonga; Heart of the Hunter
- Spouse: Lesego Khoza (m. 2021)

Bonko Cosmo Khoza (born 13 August 1991) is a South African actor, director and producer. He is known for his breakthrough role of Mqhele Zulu in the Showmax drama series The Wife.

Khoza's film debut was in the 2015 feature film Necktie Youth, for which he received a nomination for Best Actor at the Tribeca Film Festival. His other films includes Beautifully Broken (2018), Office Invasion (2022), The Woman King (2022), Heart of the Hunter (2024) and The Drop (2024).

== Early life and education ==
Bonko Cosmo Khoza was born and raised in the South of Johannesburg, South Africa and is of Zulu descent.

Khoza matriculated in 2009 from National School of Arts after majoring in Fine Arts. He then enrolled at The Market Theatre Laboratory studying Performance and Theatre Skills Courses.

== Career ==
After his feature film debut in the 2015 film Necktie Youth, he went on to appear in the History Channel miniseries Roots. He then landed his first lead role in the 2018 American short drama film Beautifully Broken directed by Eric Welsh. In 2020 he starred as Mqhele Zulu in the Showmax drama series The Wife, based on the book by Dudu Busani-Dube of the same name. He received acclaim for his performance. He reprises his role in the second season. He left for the third season; his role was taken over by Wiseman Mncube. He then appeared as Zakhele on SABC 1 romantic comedy drama series 13 Weeks To Find Mr Right.

In 2022, he starred alongside Vuyo Dabula in the Netflix film Collision as Larry and joined the cast of the Disney animated series Kiya & the Kimoja Heroes voicing the character Daddy Jo. He also appeared alongside Viola Davis in Gina Prince Bythewood's The Woman King. He continued his TV appearances in series such as The Brave Ones, Professionals, Red Ink, and Mabaso Family Reunion: The Funeral and Marked.

In 2024, he landed the lead role in the Mzansi Magic supernatural fantasy telenovela Ithonga playing the dual roles Banele and Sanele Magwaza. He later starred as Zuko Khumalo on Deon Meyer's Netflix action film Heart of the Hunter with Connie Ferguson. In 2026 he starred in Showtime's The Nowhere Man.

== Personal life ==
Khoza married fellow actress Lesego Khoza in March 2021 after dating for 6 years. The couple welcomed their daughter Amahubo Khoza later.

== Filmography ==
Key
†	Denotes productions that have not yet been released

=== Film ===
Year	Title	Role
2015	Nickiet Youth	Jabz
2018	Beautifully Broken	Mongezi Matt
2022	Office Invasion	Liam
2022	Collision	Larry
2023	The Woman King	Boma
2023	Headspace	Norman (voice)
2024	Heart of the Hunter	Zuko Khumalo
2024	The Drop	Detective Mamela
2024	Spiral	Norman Warbton

=== Television ===
Year	Title	Role
2020–2021	The Wife	Mqhele Zulu
2021	13 Weeks To Find Mr Right	Zakhele
2022	The Brave Ones	Nkosi
2022–Present	Professionals	Akbar
2023–Present	Kiya & the Kimoja Heroes	Daddy Jo
2024	Red Ink	Napelion/Sfiso/Sipho
2025	Mabaso Family Reunion: The Funeral	Bongani
2025	Levels	Steve
2025–Present	Marked	Lingile Godongwane
2025-2026	Ithonga	Sanele / Banele Magwaza
2026–Present	The Nowhere Man	Lukaz

== External references ==
- Bonko Khoza at IMDb
- Official website
- Bonko Khoza on Instagram
