= 1802: Love Defies Time =

South African drama television series

- Genre: Drama; fantasy; telenovela
- Created by: Lulu Hela
- Written by: Caroline Doherty; Amanda Lane; Thulani Cekiso; Lynn Kekana-Ngxale; Bonie Sithebe; Bacoliwe Mthupha; Siyethemba Nkomonde
- Directed by: Wandile Magadla; Tebogo Mkhabela; Tsepo Desando
- Starring: Sikelelwa Vuyelani; Prince Grootboom; Lusanda Mbane; Lunathi Mampofu; Thembisa Mdoda; Zenande Mfenyana; Vuyolethu Ngcukana; Motheo Ratikane; Amanda Quwe; Sisekho Velelo
- Country of origin: South Africa
- Original language: Xhosa
- No. of seasons: 1
- No. of episodes: 69

Production
- Executive producer: Lulu Hela
- Producer: Hela Media
- Camera setup: Multi-camera
- Running time: 22–24 minutes

Original release
- Network: 1Magic; Mzansi Magic
- Release: 1 May 2023 – 5 January 2026

1802: Love Defies Time is a South African romantic drama series aired on 1Magic and Mzansi Magic produced by Lulu Hela. It is a series that explores the connection between two individuals whose lives intersect across different eras. Blending elements of fantasy and emotional storytelling.

== Premise ==
1802: Love Defies Time is a South African fantasy romance telenovela about Khosi, a modern-day doctor who after eloping with her love Zuko, is magically transported back in time to the 1800s, where she finds her true destiny involves a powerful chieftain, Melisizwe and a destined love story bridging centuries, complicated by ancestral curses, powerful magic, and warring tribes. It is a tale of forbidden love, destiny, and tradition, as Khosi navigates ancient culture and a spiritual battle across time.

== Cast ==
=== Main cast ===
- Sikelelwa Vuyeleni as Khosi
- Prince Grootboom as Melisizwe
- Lusanda Mbane as Nkosazana
- Lunathi Mampofu as Athi
- Zenande Mfenyana as Nompumelelo
- Thembisa Mdoda as MamThembu
- Vuyo Ngcukana as Zuko
- Amanda Quwe as MamCwerha
- Khayakazi Kula as Nomakhala
- Pakamisa Zwedala as King Tshawe
- Gabriel Mini as Xesibe

=== Supporting cast ===
- Tina Jaxa as Nomawonga
- Macebo Twalo as MamCwerha Guard 1
- Luzuko Nkqeto as King Debeza
- Thuli Zulu as Thandokazi
- Liopelo Maphathe as Nomathamsanqa/Dikeledi
- Thami Mbongo as MamCwerha's Brother
- Khojane Morai as Nduku
- Lethabo Bereng as Lesego
- Robert Mpisi as Mdizeni
- Saint Seseli as Lubabalo/Lerumo
- Zizi Peteni as Athi's Uncle
- Sizwe Msutu as Dungudela

== Production ==
1802:Love Defies was produced by Hela Media and created by Amanda Lane based on a concept by Bacoliwe Mthupha and Siyethemba Nkomonde. The series spent two years in development, executive produced and co-created by Lulu Hela. The production team emphasized cultural authenticity for its portrayal of the KwaMajola kingdom, employing Nasipi as a language advisor and translator to ensure the IsiXhosa dialogue remained accurate to the 19th-century setting.

== Release ==
The series ran from 1 May 2023 to 4 March 2024, airing on 1Magic Monday to Wednesday at 20:30 and began airing on Mzansi Magic at 19:00 on 3 February 2025 to 5 January 2026.
