= Dora's Peace =

- Directed by: Konstandino Kalarytis
- Written by: Andrew Herold
- Story by: Kosta Kalarytis
- Produced by: Dumi Gumbi; Gabriella Kalarytis; Kosta Kalarytis
- Starring: Khabonina Qubeka; Danny Keogh; Hlubi Mboya; Ronnie Nyakale; Paballo Koza
- Cinematography: Nic Hofmeyr
- Edited by: Kosta Kalarytis
- Music by: Geo Höhn
- Production company: One Man Band
- Release date: 26 August 2016
- Running time: 85 minutes
- Country: South Africa
- Language: English

Dora's Peace is a 2016 South African crime drama directed by Konstandino Kalarytis and starring Khabonina Qubeka, Danny Keogh, Hlubi Mboya, Ronnie Nyakale and Paballo Koza.

== Cast ==
- Denel Honeyball as Kelly
- Danny Keogh as Stavro
- Paballo Koza as Peace
- Yule Masiteng as Father Khumalo
- Israel Makoe as Shakes
- Hlubi Mboya as Connie
- Tinah Mnumzana as Dora's mom
- Molefi Monaisa as Themba
- Ronnie Nyakale as Vusi
- Khabonina Qubeka as Dora
- Meren Reddy as Ravi

== Reception ==
Theresa Smith of Independent Online awarded the film four stars out of five.

== Accolades and nominations ==
The film was nominated for five Africa Movie Academy Awards, including Best Achievement in Sound, Best Actress in a Leading Role (Khabonina Qubeka), Best Young Actor (Paballo Koza), Best Makeup and Best Screenplay.

At the Boston International Film Festival, Qubeka won the Indie Spirit Award for Best Actress and director Konstandino Kalarytis won a Special Recognition Award.

For her performance, Hlubi Mboya won the South African Film and Television Award for Best Supporting Actress in a Feature Film. Nerine Pienaar and Jolandi Pienaar were also nominated for the SAFTA Award for Best Achievement in Costume Design – Feature Film.

The film also won the Best South African Feature Film award at the Jozi Film Festival and was nominated for the Rapid Lion Award for Best South African Film.
