= Jiva! (TV series) =

2021 South-african drama series

- Release poster
- Genre: Drama
- Written by: Busisiwe Ntintili; Bakang Sebatjane
- Directed by: Scottnes L. Smith; Mandla Dube
- Country of origin: South Africa
- Original language: English
- No. of seasons: 1
- No. of episodes: 5

Production
- Producers: Busisiwe Ntintili; Adam Friedlander; Tebogo Maila
- Production companies: Blue Ice Africa; The Ntintili Factory

Original release
- Network: Netflix
- Release: June 24, 2021

Jiva! (stylized as JIVA!) is a South African drama television series created by Busisiwe Ntintili and Bakang Sebatjane and directed by Scottnes L. Smith and Mandla Dube. The series premiered on Netflix on June 24, 2021.

== Synopsis ==
A talented street dancer from Umlazi, Durban must confront her fears and deal with family objections to pursue her dancing dreams.

== Cast ==
- Noxolo Dlamini as Ntombi
- Candice Modiselle as Vuyiswa
- Sne Mbatha as Zinhle
- Stella Dlangalala as Lady E
- Zazi Kunene as Nolwazi
- Prince Grootboom as Makhekhe "Nathi"
- Given Stuurman as Samukelo "Samu"
- Tony Kgoroge as Bra Zo
- Anga Makubalo as DJ Sika
- Sibulele Gcilitshana as Thuleleni
- Zamani Mbatha as Bheki
- Kagiso Modupe as Menzi
- Siv Ngesi as Paul

== Production ==
=== Development ===
It was reported that Netflix is making an African series.

== Episodes ==
No.	Title	Directed by	Written by	Original release date
1	"Dala What You Must"	Scottnes L. Smith & Mandla Dube	Busisiwe Ntintili & Bakang Sebatjane	June 24, 2021
In Umlazi, Ntombi is torn between family duties and her dream of winning the Jiva Loxion dance competition. Will past tragedy stand in her way?
2	"The Trollies"	Scottnes L. Smith & Mandla Dube	Busisiwe Ntintili & Bakang Sebatjane	June 24, 2021
After bringing two frenemies on board, Ntombi struggles to complete her dance crew. Political scandal threatens to upend Vuyiswa's cushy lifestyle.
3	"Flash Round"	Scottnes L. Smith & Mandla Dube	Busisiwe Ntintili & Bakang Sebatjane	June 24, 2021
Vuyiswa's flakiness starts to get on Ntombi's nerves. Later at the club, the Trollies must impress the judges during a flash round — or be eliminated.
4	"Fix Your Crown"	Scottnes L. Smith & Mandla Dube	Busisiwe Ntintili & Bakang Sebatjane	June 24, 2021
Ntombi wrestles with guilt over her mom's accident. Short of options, Vuvu calls on an old friend. Nathi tries to smooth things over with Ntombi
5	"Fetch Your Life"	Scottnes L. Smith & Mandla Dube	Busisiwe Ntintili & Bakang Sebatjane	June 24, 2021
Ntombi connects with Bheki, while Menzi surprises Vuvu. With the best pantsulas and bhengas on display at the finals, can the Trollies hold their own?
