= Khayalethu Xaba =

South African actor (born 2004)

- Born: Khayalethu Xaba; 6 November 2004 (age 21); Johannesburg, Gauteng, South Africa
- Other name: Khaya
- Education: Parklands High School
- Occupations: Actor; comedian
- Years active: 2021–present
- Notable work: Smoke & Mirrors
- Partner: Kiba Mavi (2025–present)

Khayalethu Xaba (born 6 November 2004) is a South African actor and comedian. He is best known for his starring role of Mpendulo Buthelezi on e.tv telenovela Smoke & Mirrors (2023–2025).

== Early life ==
Xaba was born in Johannesburg, Gauteng, South Africa. He is the oldest child in the number of 2 children. He attended from Alberton Primary School and then progressed to Parklands High School when he graduated with his National Senior Certificate.

== Career ==
Xaba made his television debut with Mzansi Magic television series Lavish portraying Shaka Gumede. He then starred as one of the lead actors on e.tv telenovela Smoke & Mirrors playing Mpendulo Buthelezi since 2023 until his departure in 2025. The same year in 2023, he played the recurring role of Bully in Shaka iLembe. In 2024, he played in a short film The Passage as Bafana and played the supporting role of Themba in a Netflix series Disaster Holiday. In 2025, Xaba starred in Mzansi Wethu telenovela Homecoming as Vusi.

== Personal life ==
In an Instagram post of September 2025, Xaba confirmed he is in romantic relationship with Homecoming co-star Kiba Mavi and stated that their madly in love with each other.
