= Angela Makholwa =

South African author

- Born: Johannesburg, South Africa
- Education: Rhodes University
- Occupation: Author
- Known for: One of the first black authors to publish crime fiction in South Africa
- Notable work: Red Ink (2007)

Angela Makholwa is a South African author, one of the first black writers to write crime fiction in South Africa.

== Life ==
Born in Johannesburg, South Africa, Makholwa graduated in journalism from Rhodes University. She worked as a magazine journalist and public relations consultant for several agencies before establishing her own public relations firm, Britespark Communications, in 2002. She came to the literary scene in 2007 with Red Ink, the first crime fiction by a black author in South Africa. In Red Ink, the fictional detective, Lucy — a successful public relations writer — is drawn into investigating a horrifying series of rapes and murders:

It has suspense, violence, murder. Best of all it carries no old South African baggage: this is the indifferent world of new bling South Africa.

Makholwa followed this up two years later with a chick-lit novel, The 30th Candle (2009). Her third novel was Black Widow Society (2013) and her fourth novel, The Blessed Girl, was published in October 2017. Her last novel, Critical, But Stable, was released in 2021.

== Works ==
- Red Ink, Pan Macmillan, 2007
- The 30th Candle, Pan Macmillan, 2009
- Black Widow Society, Pan Macmillan, 2013
- The Blessed Girl, Pan Macmillan, 2017
- Critical, But Stable, Pan MacMillan, 2021
