= Lindiwe Chibi =

South African actress

- Born: Lindiwe Chibi; 1976; South Africa
- Died: 2007 (aged 31); Chris Hani-Baragwanath Hospital, Soweto
- Occupation: Actor
- Years active: 1995–2005
- Partner: Dan Mokoena

Lindiwe Chibi (1976–2007) was a South African actress. Regarded as one of the most accomplished actresses in South African television, she is best known for her role as 'Doobsie' in the popular series Muvhango.

== Gunshot and death ==
On 30 April 2005, her boyfriend Dan Mokoena, shot her in the face when Chibi was at her mother's home. The gunshot which was fired at close range, entered her cheek and exited at the back of her head. She was rushed into the Garden City Clinic hospital and was in a coma for three weeks. After rising from coma, she was paralysed down the right side of her body. During her recovery from the fatal injuries, she died of pneumonia at Chris Hani-Baragwanath Hospital in Soweto in 2007 at the age of 31.

== Career ==
In 1995, she started professional acting career with theater play Ekuseni which was performed at the Civic Theatre. Then she performed in the play Game at the Windybrow Theatre, where she received an Award for the Best Actress. Then she played the role of 'Stella Kowalski' in the classic play, A Street Car Named Desire as well as in The Pen and Molora. She made the popular villain role 'Doobsie' in the television serial Muvhango. After her death, her role was announced retired.

On 3 August 2018, the Market Theatre Foundation was named its upper-floor boardroom in honour of Chibi.
