= Thembisa Nxumalo =

South African actress

Thembisa Mdoda – Nxumalo
- Born: Thembisa Liyema Mdoda; 16 November 1982 (age 43); Mthatha, Transkei
- Citizenship: South African
- Education: University of the Witwatersrand
- Occupations: presenter; actress; television personality; singer; writer
- Known for: Our Perfect Wedding, House of Zwide
- Spouse: Atandwa Kani (m. 2012; div. 2015) Eric Nxumalo (m. 2020)
- Relatives: Anele Mdoda (sister)

Thembisa Nxumalo (née Mdoda) (born November 16, 1982) is a South African television personality and actress.

== Career ==
Mdoda attended University of the Witwatersrand and obtained degree in Graphic Design.

Her career began as newsreader on Wits radio before she left to work for Highveld After Dark.

In November 2015, she landed on a role of hosting season 6 of Our Perfect Wedding reality television show.

That same year, she portrayed a role of Thabisile Cebekhulu on The Road Mzansi Magic telenova.

She contested on Dancing with the Stars SA in December 2017.

In early February 2018, she bagged a role on hosting Your Next Million television game show. Following month, Mdoda joined Metro FM to host Weekend Breakfast Show with Mo G.

Mdoda landed on a role of portraying Nikiwe Ndlovu on House of Zwide in February 2022.

In June 2022, she landed on a role of hosting Umndende, which premiered on July 23, 2022. She also bagged a role on hosting Suxoka same month.

In November 2023, Thembisa was announced as a host of The Mommy Club Reunion, Showmax reality show premiered on December 5.

== Filmography ==
Year	Title	Role	Notes
2015	Our Perfect Wedding	co-host	
2018	Your Next Million	co-host	
2018	Unmarried	Thembi	
2021	The Queen	Vuyiswa Jola - Maake	Temporarily replacing Zandile Msutwana
2022	House of Zwide	Nikiwe Ndlovu	
2023	The Mommy Club Reunion	Host	

== Personal life ==
=== Relationships ===
Mdoda first met Atandwa Kani in 2004 while attending at the University of the Witwatersrand. The couple got married in August 2012 and divorced in 2015.

== Achievements ==
=== DStv Mzansi Viewers' Choice Awards ===
Year	Nominee / work	Award	Result	Ref.
2017	Herself	Ultimate Viewers' Choice Award	Won	
2017	Herself	TV Presenter	Won	

=== South African Film and Television Awards ===
Year	Nominee / work	Award	Result	Ref.
2017	Herself	Best TV Presenter	Won	

=== South African Style Awards ===
Year	Nominee / work	Award	Result	Ref.
2017	Herself	Most Stylish Performing Artist	Won	
