= Anele Mgudlwa =

South African television personality (born 1984)

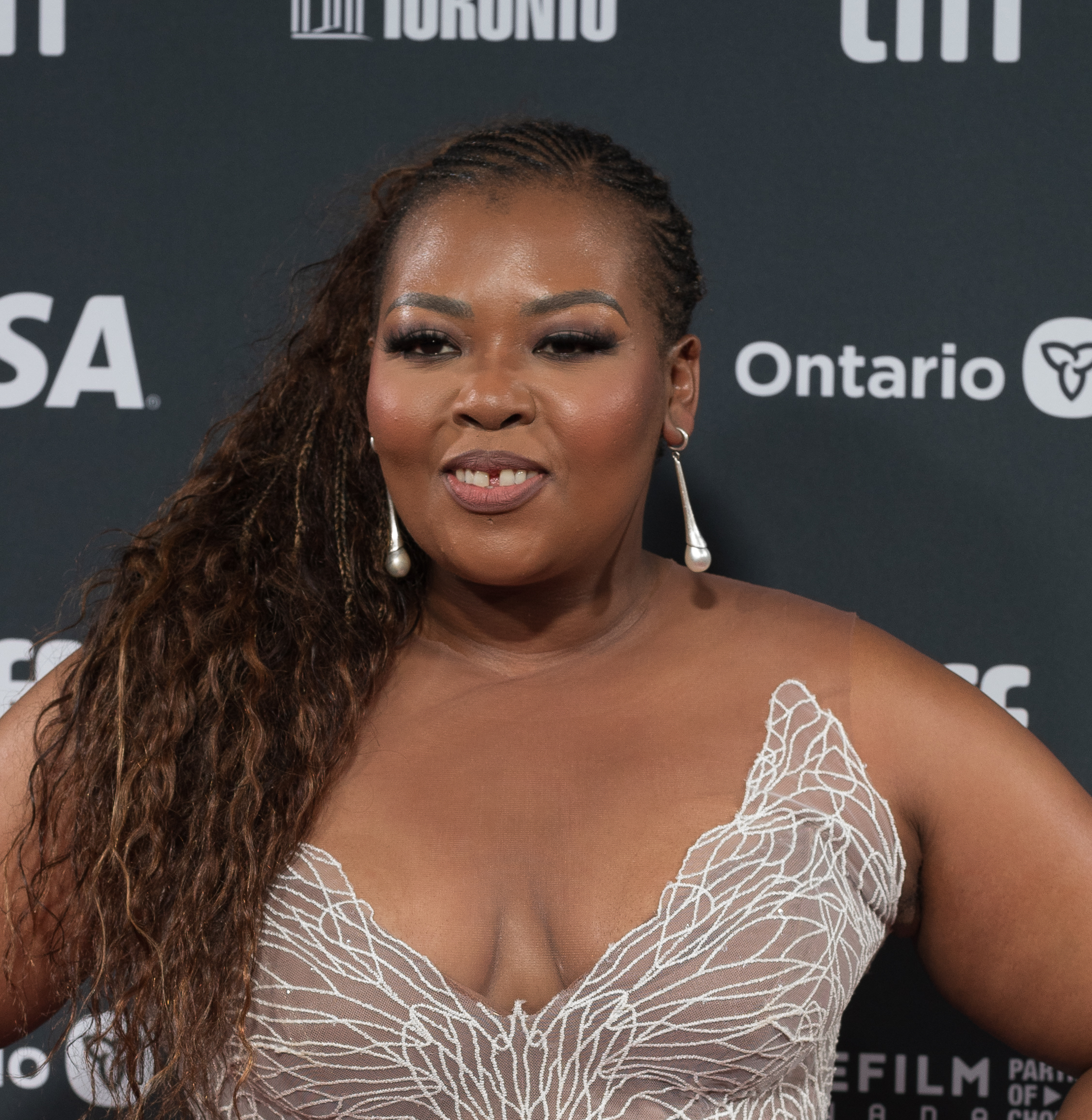
- Mgudlwa at the 2024 Toronto International Film Festival
- Born: Anele Mdoda; 19 May 1984 (age 42); Mthatha, Transkei
- Other name: Mthawelanga Mgudlwa (traditional given marital name)
- Occupations: Television presenter; radio personality; producer; businesswoman; author
- Years active: 2004–present
- Spouse: Bonelela Buzza James Mgudlwa (m. 2026)
- Children: 1 (Alakhe Mdoda)
- Relatives: Thembisa Mdoda (sister)

Anele Mthawelanga Mgudlwa (née Mdoda; born May 19, 1984) is a South African television presenter, radio personality, producer, businesswoman and author. Born and raised in Mthatha, Eastern Cape. Her career began at the age of 19 in 2003 as a radio DJ. Mgudlwa is currently the host of 947's breakfast show Anele and the Club on 947.

== Career ==
Anele Mdoda was born May 19, 1984, in Mthatha, Eastern Cape. Her sister Thembisa Mdoda is also a television personality. After her matric she enrolled at University of Pretoria Degree in Politics and International Relations, but did not manage to complete her degree. She started her radio career at Tuks FM. She rose to prominence at Tuks FM with her co-host Grant Nash. She worked at Highveld Stereo after her graduation in 2007. The following year, after she left Highveld Stereo she went on to work for 5FM. That same year she participated on the fifth season of Strictly Come Dancing reality competition.

From 2009 to 2010, Mdoda co-hosted SA's Got Talent which was aired on SABC 2 along with Rob van Vuuren.

Mdoda was announced Miss South Africa judge in 2012, that same year she became a judge of reality competition Clash of the Choirs.

In 2013, she hosted docu-reality series Dream School SA aired on M-Net.

Tongue in Cheek talk show was co-hosted by Anele in 2014, two years later she hosted daytime talk show Real Talk with Anele.

In May 2016, she co-hosted Our Perfect Wedding with her sister Thembisa.

In November 2018, Mdoda joined 947 as Breakfast Club show host. That same month she hosted third season of The Voice South Africa, which aired on M-Net

In 2020, Mdoda was a judge for the Miss South Africa 2020 pageant.

In February 2021, she landed on role of hosting Pan-African television show The Buzz.

In September 2021, she was announced as Miss South Africa host along with Nico Panagio.

Mdoda hosted Miss South Africa Beauty Pageant 2022 which was held at SunBet Arena on August 13, 2022.

In the second quarter of 2022, Mdoda co-produced Ludik, a Netflix Afrikaans series.

In early April 2023, Mdoda launched singing game show Masked Singer, broadcast on SABC 3 and hosted by Mpho Popps in partnership with SABC 1 and Primedia.

In early October 2024, Mdoda was announced as the host of 2024 DStv Content Creator Awards.

=== Endorsement ===
In early May 2019, Mdoda was announced as Domestos' official Sanitation Brand Ambassador.

== Filmography ==
Year	Title	Role	Notes
2024	DStv Content Creator Awards	Host	

== Personal life ==
In April 2025, she married Bonelela Buzza James Mgudlwa, a South African lawyer and Thembu prince.

== Achievements ==
Throughout her career Mdoda has scored several locally and international accolades. In 2012, she was named Rising Star of the Year by Media Magazine. At 27th Annual Nickelodeon's Kids Choice Awards, she won Top South African Radio DJ.

Anele won Best talk Show at the 2017 Golden Horn Awards. She also won Best Breakfast Show Host at the South African Radio Awards 2021.

=== Honors ===
- Industry Icon of The Year: Anele Mdoda (Broadcasting) — GQ South Africa Men of the Year (2024)

=== Basadi in Music Awards ===
Year	Nominee / work	Award	Result	Ref.
2024	The Masked Singer	Entertainment TV Producer of the Year	Nominated	

=== Best of Joburg Awards ===
Year	Nominee / work	Award	Result	Ref.
2020	Herself	Best radio personality	Won	
2021	Herself	Best Radio Personality of the Year	Won	

=== South African Film and Television Awards ===
Year	Nominee / work	Award	Result	Ref.
2017	Herself	Best talk Show	Won	

=== South African Radio Awards ===
Year	Nominee / work	Award	Result	Ref.
2022	Club 947	Breakfast show presenter	Pending	
2022	Herself	Best Breakfast Show Presenter	Pending	
2022	Herself	Best Promotions/Stunt	Pending	
2022	The Perfect Proposal	Best Multi-Channel Promotions	Pending	
2022	LottoStar Summer of Millions with 947	Best Radio Innovation	Pending	

== Controversies ==
In 2016, Mdoda faced backlash after a holiday in Israel. The criticism followed her visit during a period when the South African government supported a cultural boycott of Israel. In a X (formerly Twitter) post, Mdoda referred to the land of Israel as "beautiful". She dismissed the criticism as "political babble."

In the same year, Mdoda said that Kelly Rowland isn't as attractive as Beyoncé. The statement led to debate among fans, with many questioning Mdoda's perspective on beauty in the realm of celebrity comparisons.
