= Ithonga =

South African drama television series

- Genre: Crime
- Created by: Tshedza Pictures
- Written by: Gwydion Beynon; Phathutshedzo Makwarela; Mandisa Mkhize
- Directed by: Nozipho Nkelemba; Tebogo Mkhabela; Zolani Phakade
- Starring: Bonko Khoza; Siphosethu Mabaso; Ayanda Borotho; Nelisiwe Sibiya; Noluthando Ngema; Menzi Biyela; Bonga Dlamini; Nkanyiso Mchunu; Nqobile Mdladla; Unathi Mkhize
- Country of origin: South Africa
- No. of seasons: 1
- No. of episodes: 260

Production
- Executive producers: Phathutshedzo Makwarela; Gwydeon Beynon; Khanyi Nxumalo
- Producer: Tshedza Pictures
- Camera setup: Multi-camera
- Running time: 22–24 minutes

Original release
- Network: Mzansi Magic
- Release: 3 March 2025 – 27 February 2026

Ithonga is a South African drama series that premiered on Mzansi Magic in March 2025 and produced by Tshedza Pictures. It stars Bonko Khoza as twin brothers whose fates are mysteriously connected. Set in KwaZulu-Natal as it explores themes of family, destiny and the spiritual bond between twins.

== Premise ==
Ithonga tells the story of twin brothers Banele and Sanele, whose lives are bound by destiny but divided by circumstance. One brother lives a life of honesty and hope, while the other is drawn into a dark world of crime and betrayal. Set against the backdrop of KwaZulu-Natal’s construction underworld, the series explores questions of identity, fate and the mystical bond shared between twins. Blending elements of family drama, suspense and spirituality.

== Cast ==
Actor/Actress	Character	Seasons
Actor/Actress	Character	Season 1
Bonko Khoza	Banele & Sanele Magwaza	Main
Siphosethu Mabaso	Nqobizitha Pablo Ntanzi	Main
Ayanda Borotho	Thandeka "MaKhumalo" Magwaza	Main
Nelisiwe Sibiya	Zamahlobo "Zama" Ntanzi	Main
Noluthando Ngena	Mbali Dladla	Main
Menzi Biyela	Mbongeni Magwaza	Main
Nkanyiso Mchunu	Phindokuhle "Phinda" Ndlovu	Main
Bonga Dlamini	Themba Dladla	Main
Unathi Mkhize	Lethokuhle Dladla	Recurring
Nqobile Mdladla	Ayanda Magwaza	Recurring
Simphiwe Ndlela	Nokwanda "MaHlophe" Magwaza	Recurring
Wanda Mdladla	Lungelo Dladla	Recurring
Precious Ndlovu	Nonkululeko "MaMbhele" Dladla	Recurring
Zodwa Nkosi	Faith Ndlovu	Recurring

=== Former cast ===
Actor/Actress	Character	Seasons
Actor/Actress	Character	Season 1
Ntokozo Dlamini	Gadla	Recurring
Malibongwe Yawu	Mduduzi Ntanzi	Recurring
Anele Nene	Nkosinathi Dladla	Recurring
Zama Ngcobo	Thulisile	Recurring
Simthema Biko	Young Banele	Recurring
Simthemile Biko	Young Sanele	Recurring

== Production ==
Ithonga is a South African drama series produced by Tshedza Pictures for Mzansi Magic. It was created and written by Gwydion Beynon, Phathutshedzo Makwarela and Mandisa Mkhize and directed by Nozipho Nkelemba with support from Tebogo Mkhabela and Zolani Phakade. It is filmed in KwaZulu-Natal, South Africa giving the show a strong cultural and regional identity. The series stars Bonko Khoza in a dual role as twin brothers, supported by a large ensemble cast. Executive producers include Phathutshedzo Makwarela, Gwydion Beynon and Khanyi Nxumalo and uses a Multi-camera.

== Release ==
The series premiered on Mzansi Magic from 3 March 2025 to 27 February 2026, airing Mondays to Fridays at 20:30.
