= Desmond Dube =

South African entertainer

- Born: 25 January 1969 (age 57); South Africa
- Occupations: Comedian; actor; writer; producer
- Years active: 1994–present
- Spouse: Tlotliso Matsela

Desmond Dube (born 25 January 1969) is a South African comedian, actor, writer, and producer. He is best known for starring in the 'Amaglug-glug television commercial and for his comedy show called Dube on Mondays on SABC 2and Netflix's How to Ruin Christmas, Marked and 180.

== Career ==
He has performed in the plays Jozi Jozi and Peto and the musical Street Sisters, and appeared in the play Joseph and the Amazing Technicolour Dreamcoat. He appeared in industrial theatre productions for Eskom, Siyabonga and the AIDS Show. He also played a role in the "Amaglugglug" commercial for SASOL, which won him a Loerie Award for Best Contribution.

Dube appeared in the feature film Inside and the series Tarzan: The Epic Adventures in 1996 and 1999. In 2002, he appeared in the film The Long Run, and in 2004, he appeared in the film Hotel Rwanda. In 2008, Dube starred as BK in the TV series The No. 1 Ladies' Detective Agency.

Dube on Monday, a comedy variety show in South Africa, is broadcast on SABC 3 TV. The show brought Dube controversy when, in 2003, he compared members of the Shangaan ethnic group to baboons during the show. Dube apologized on air later, though he defended his statements the next day. The National Assembly Deputy Speaker criticized the SABC for not taking strong action against Dube in the aftermath, and for failing to condemn his statements.

In 2017, he was expected to host the game show #Karektas.

== Personal life ==
He is married to Tlotliso Matsela.

== Filmography ==
Year	Title	Role	Notes
1996	Inside	Scabenga	TV Movie
1996	Joburg Blues	Jakes Kubeka	TV Movie
1996	Panic Mechanic		Comedy
1999	Millennium Menace	Desmond	Comedy
2004	Hotel Rwanda	Dube	Docudrama / War / Biography / Drama
2008	The No. 1 Ladies' Detective Agency	BK	TV Series 7 episodes
2019	Impilo: The Scam	Khulubuse	TV series; starring role

== See also ==
- Dube on 2
