= Dudu Busani-Dube =

South African author and journalist (born 1981)

- Born: Duduzile Busani; 7 September 1981 (age 45); KwaMashu, KwaZulu-Natal, South Africa
- Education: Durban University of Technology (Diploma)
- Occupations: Writer; Journalist
- Years active: 2014–present
- Notable work: Hlomu the Wife (2015), Naledi-His love (2015), Zandile the Resolute (2015), Zulu Wedding (2018), Iqunga (2020), Mess (2020), The End (2022), The Blue House (2024)
- Television: The Wife (2021)
- Website: www.hlomupublishing.co.za

Dudu Busani-Dube (born 7 September 1981) is a South African author and journalist.

Dube is a print journalist by profession. She holds a diploma in journalism from Durban University of Technology.

== Literary career ==
=== The Hlomu Series ===
In May 2014, she started working on her debut novel Hlomu the Wife. The book was a success and helped launch the Hlomu Series. She would add six editions to the Hlomu Series with Naledi-His love and Zandile the Resolute launched in the same year as Hlomu the Wife. Iqunga, Mess, and the final edition The End rounded up the series. The final book as nominated in the Adult Fiction category at the 2023 SA Book Awards.

Dube was tasked with making a book adaption of the 2017 film Zulu Wedding. The book was finalised in 2018.

In 2024, she announced The House Series with the first book titled The Blue House.

== Television ==
In 2021, South African streaming service Showmax announced that Dube's Hlomu the Wife would be their first telenovela, titled The Wife. The first episode went on to break Showmax's record for first-day views and outperforming the launch of any film or series on Showmax, including the likes of Game of Thrones, The Real Housewives of Durban and The River on the streaming site.

== Other works ==
Dube co-launched the iLembe Book Festival with the help of the iLembe District Municipality to help promote a reading culture in the local community in 2023.

== Bibliography ==
Series	Title	Year	Ref
The Hlomu Series	Hlomu the Wife	2015	
The Hlomu Series	Naledi -His love	2015	
The Hlomu Series	Zandile the Resolute	2015	
	Zulu Wedding	2018	
The Hlomu Series	Iqunga	2020	
The Hlomu Series	Mess	2020	
The Hlomu Series	The End	2022	
The House Series	The Blue House	2024	
