= Beautifully Broken (2018 film) =

2018 film by Eric Welch

- Film poster
- Directed by: Eric Welch
- Written by: Brad Allen; Lauren Damrich; Chuck Howard; Mark E. McCann; Martin Michael; Eric Welch
- Produced by: Brad Allen; Lisa Arnold; Jarred Coates; Chuck Howard; Martin Michael
- Starring: Benjamin A. Onyango; Scott William Winters; Michael W. Smith; Emily Hahn; Caitlin Nicol-Thomas; Eric Roberts
- Cinematography: James King
- Edited by: Peter Devaney Flanagan; Eric Welch
- Music by: Geoff Koch
- Production companies: All Entertainment; Big Film Factory; Film Incito; Red Entertainment Group
- Distributed by: ArtEffects
- Release date: September 24, 2018
- Country: United States
- Language: English
- Budget: $1.1 million
- Box office: $1.2 million

Beautifully Broken is a 2018 American Christian drama film directed by Eric Welch. The film stars Benjamin A. Onyango, Scott William Winters, Michael W. Smith, Emily Hahn, Caitlin Nicol-Thomas and Eric Roberts in pivotal roles. It was released on August 24, 2018 by ArtEffects.

== Plot ==
As three fathers fight to save their families, their lives become intertwined in an unlikely journey across the world, where they learn about forgiveness and reconciliation.

== Cast ==
- Benjamin Onyango as William Mwizerwa
- Scott William Winters as Randy Hartley
- Michael W. Smith as Pastor Henry
- Emily Hahn as Andrea Hartley
- Caitlin Nicol-Thomas as Darla Hartley
- Eric Roberts as Larry Hartley
- Ditebogo Ledwaba as Umuhoza
- Sibulele Gcilitshana as keza
- Bonko Khoza as Mugenzi Matt

== Release ==
Beautifully Broken was released in the United States on August 24, 2018.

=== Critical response ===
On review aggregator website Rotten Tomatoes, the film has an approval rating of 67% based on six reviews, and an average rating of 5.8/10.
