= Inimba =

South African drama television series

- Genre: Telenovela
- Created by: Siphosethu Tshapu
- Written by: Siphosethu Tshapu; Sacha Stokes; Nombulelo Mcwerah; Sibusiso Khumalo; Ranga Chikwene; Nonzi Bogatsu; Kirsten M. Adams
- Directed by: Mamohato Askew; Siyabonga Mkhize; Thandokazi Msumza; Lufuno Nekhabambe
- Starring: Lunathi Mampofu; Loyiso Macdonald; Siya Raymond; Ayakha Ntunja; Zenande Mfenyana; Sisa Hewana; Siyabonga Shibe; Prince Grootboom; Zizi Peteni; Andrea Dondolo; Nkanyiso Makhanya
- Country of origin: South Africa
- Original language: Xhosa
- No. of seasons: 2
- No. of episodes: 210

Production
- Executive producers: Thandi Ramathesele; Siphosethu Tshapu
- Producer: The Milton Empire
- Camera setup: Multi-camera
- Running time: 22–24 minutes

Original release
- Network: Mzansi Magic
- Release: 14 April 2025 – present

Inimba is a South African drama series that airs on Mzansi Magic. Set in Johannesburg, Inimba is a compelling story centred on family, motherhood and hidden bonds that shape the lives of its characters. It explores themes of identity, truth and the powerful ties that connect and divide two families.

== Premise ==
Inimba follows Zoleka Bikitsha-Mabandla played by Lunathi Mampofu who returns to South Africa after twenty years away seeking to face her painful past with has buried secrets. When long hidden truths begin to surface, families are pushed into conflict as loyalties are tested and identities are questioned. As the characters confront betrayal, loss and unexpected revelations, the series explores how the instinct to protect and survive shapes every decision they make. Through emotional storytelling and tension filled twists, it examines the weight of heritage and the lengths one will go to reclaim love and truth.

== Cast ==
Actor/Actress	Character	Seasons	
Actor/Actress	Character	Season 1	Season 2
Lunathi Mampofu	Zoleka Bikitsha–Ngcukana	Main	Main
Sisa Hewana	Hlathi Mabandla	Main	Main
Zenande Mfenyana	Thumeka Mabandla	Main	Main
Loyiso Macdonald	Lazarus Ngcukana	Main	Main
Ayakha Ntunja	Qhawe Mabandla	Main	Main
Siya Raymond	Azande Ngcukana		Main
Siyabonga Shibe	Sydney Zondo	Main	Main
Prince Grootboom	Mawethu Sonjica	Main	Main
Nasiphi Ntabeni	Nontsikelelo Mabandla	Recurring	Main
Zizi Peteni	Thulani Mabandla	Recurring	Main
Pumeza Rashe Matoti	Thandeka Mabandla	Recurring	Main
Andrea Dondolo	Magaba Bikitsha	Recurring	Recurring
Sandile Mahlangu	Ongama Mhlongo	Recurring	Recurring
Nkanyiso Makhanya	Lwandle Zondo	Main	Recurring
Emmanuel Gweva	Lukhanyo Bikitsha	Recurring	Recurring
Tshepiso Heme	Likamva Mabandla	Recurring	Guest
Samkelo Ndlovu	Lillian Gumede	Recurring	Recurring
Tina Jaxa	Nomfundiso Ngcukana	Recurring	Recurring
Luzuko Nkqeto	Zwelinzima Ngcukana	Recurring	Recurring

=== Former cast ===
Actor/Actress	Character	Seasons
Mbali Ngwenya	Detective khanyile	1
Kay Sibiya	Titus	1
Thuli Zulu	Tsaki's mother	1
Tshepiso Jeme	Likamva Mabandla	1

== Production ==
Inimba is produced by The Milton Company for Mzansi Magic. The series was created by Siphosethu Tshapu, who is also the head writer, and the executive producer alongside Thandi Ramathesele. Costume and production design reflect local cultural aesthetics, while the show features an ensemble cast including Lunathi Mampofu, Zenande Mfenyana, Sisa Hewana and Ayakha Ntunja. The series uses a multi-camera setup and combines family drama, suspense, and cultural storytelling.

== Release ==
The series premiered on Mzansi Magic on 14 April 2025, airing Mondays to Fridays at 21:00.
