= Hlubi Mboya =

South African actress

Hlubi Arnold
- Born: 2 March 1978 (age 48)
- Other names: Hlubi Mboya-Arnold
- Education: Rustenburg Girls' High School
- Occupations: Actress; humanitarian
- Years active: 2009
- Known for: I Am Winnie
- Notable work: I am All Girls
- Spouse: Kirsten Arnold (m. 2015)

Hlubi Arnold (née Mboya, born 2 March 1978) is a South African actress.

On television, she has portrayed Nandipha Sithole in the soap opera Isidingo. She also appeared in the 2016 film Dora's Peace, for which she won the SAFTA Award for Best Supporting Actress. She also received Golden Horn Award for the ‘Best Supporting Actress’ in a Feature Film.

== Personal life ==
Mboya has been married to Kirsten Arnold since 2015. She is of Hlubi ethnicity but is Xhosa speaking.

== Select filmography ==
- A Small Town Called Descent (2010)
- How to Steal 2 Million (2011)
- Death Race 3: Inferno (2013)
- Avenged (2013)
- Hector and the Search for Happiness (2014)
- Dora's Peace (2016)
- i am All Girls (2021)
