= Kabomo Vilakazi =

South African actor and musician (born 1978)

- Born: Kabomo Vilakazi; 27 July 1978 (age 47); Benoni, Gauteng, South Africa
- Occupations: Actor, writer, poet, editor, musician, producer, artist manager
- Years active: 2001–present

Kabomo Vilakazi (born 27 July 1978), or simply as Kabomo, is a South African actor and singer.

He is best known for the roles in the films and television serials: Zabalaza, Sink and Seriously Single. Apart from acting, he is also a writer, poet, editor, musician, rapper, producer and an artist manager.

== Personal life ==
He was born on 27 July 1978 in Benoni, Gauteng.

== Career ==
Kabomo's first single, "Uzobuya", was released in 2012. Success came with two albums, All Things Grey and Sekusile. In the soap opera Zabalaza, he played a minor role, which led to an invitation to play the starring role in the Vuzu sitcom Check Coast in 2014. In 2015, he appeared in the film Sink, then in the television serial Sober Companion, followed by appearances in popular shows such as Soul City, Scandal, Thola, Saints & Sinners, Umlilo, Captain Bozaa and Tshisa.

As a songwriter, he made several popular songs for the singers: Tshepo Tshola, Unathi, Aya, Kelly Khumalo, Thiwe, Nothende, Flabba, The Fridge, Flatoe, Pebbles, Zubz, Dineo Moeketsi. He also directed two feature films: Droplets and Melody. Meanwhile, he also wrote the script for the popular Sepedi SABC1 drama series Skeem Sam. However he was later criticized by the Droplets film crew stating that he has not paid them.

In August 2020, he starred in the comedy film Seriously Single co-directed by Katleho Ramaphakela and Rethabile Ramaphakela. It was released on 31 July 2020 on Netflix.

== Television serials ==
- Check Coast as Bheka Zonke
- Rhythm City as Robert
- Generations as Pastor Zondo
- Scandal as Doctor Ndaba
- Zabalaza as Herbert
- Sober Companion as KG
- The Republic as Minister of Finance
- The Mayor as Pastor
- Thola as Sam
- Jozi Street as Dingaan
- Smoke and Mirrors as Captain Mthetho

== Filmography ==
Year	Film	Role	Genre	Ref.
2015	Sink	Taxi driver	Film	
2020	Seriously Single	Pastor	Film	
