= Nqobile Khumalo =

South African actress (born 1992)

- Born: Nqobile Khumalo; 15 April 1992 (age 34); Swaziland
- Other name: Nunu
- Education: St. Mary's Diocesan School; Midrand Graduate Institute
- Occupations: Actress; model
- Years active: 2013–present

Nqobile "Nunu" Gamedze (née Khumalo; born 15 April 1992) is a Swazi–South African actress and model. She is best known for her television roles as Hlengiwe Twala in Scandal! (2016–2022) and Mbali Dlamini in Umthetho (2026).

== Early life ==
Nqobile Khumalo was born on 15 April 1992 in Swaziland to a Swazi family. She moved with her family moved to Johannesburg, when she was two months. She attended St. Mary's Diocesan School and then joined the Midrand Graduate Institute where she completed her degree of Bachelor of Art in Journalism.

== Career ==
Khumalo made her debut television appearance in Isibaya season 1 in 2013 where she played the role of Cindy. In 2014, she appeared as Nhlanhla in the SABC 1 youth drama series Loxion Lyric and as Relebogile Diholo in the Soul City season 12. In 2015, she played the lead role of Palesa in a short film Lost in the World. The following year, she appeared in New Queer Visions: Lust In Translation playing the segment role of Palesa. She guest-starred in the third season of the Mzansi Magic drama series Rockville, and was one of 12 finalists on the first season of the SABC 3 reality competition series She's the One, which aired from March to June.

In 2017, Khumalo played the lead role of Hlengiwe Twala in the e.tv soapie series Scandal!. In 2019, she played lead of Aluta in film Uncovered. The same year, she made history as the first African actress to win the New Vision International Film FestivaI for Best African Actress, held in Amsterdam, Netherlands. She won the award for her Scandal! "Black Tax" storyline. She played the role of Dudu in the second season of the supernatural drama series The Herd. In 2021, she played the lead of Nqobile Nkosi in a television series Nqobile. The same year, she played the starring role of Lara in a sci-fi short film Eje (Blood). In 2022, she left Scandal!, and appeared in a short film Little Broken Bodies as Mbali. The same year, she played the lead role of Siya in a film Jewel.

In 2023, Khumalo played the role of Ntfombi in South Africa's first ever IsiNdebele drama series Komkhulu. She appeared in a film Merry Men 3: Nemesis as Amieka. The same year, she played the role of Chrissy in a television series Invasion, and Chloe in a film The Vow. In 2024, she played the lead of Lucy in a Showmax television series series Red Ink. In 2025, she played the supporting role of Precious in Fatal Seduction season 2 . The same year, she appeared in a film High Infidelity as Mpho. In 2026, she played the lead in a Netflix crime drama Umthetho as Mbali Dlamini.
