= Mnqobi Prince Msezane =

South African politician

Member of the National Assembly of South Africa
- Incumbent
- Assumed office 15 June 2024

Personal details
- Born: October 23, 1989 (age 36)
- Party: uMkhonto weSizwe Party

Mnqobi Prince Msezane (born 23 October 1989) is a South African politician and a member of Parliament (MP) for the uMkhonto weSizwe Party (MK).

== See also ==
- List of National Assembly members of the 28th Parliament of South Africa
