= Nqobile Sipamla =

South African actress (born 1984)

- Born: Nqobile Sipamla; 9 February 1983 (age 43); Soweto, South Africa
- Education: AFDA, The School for the Creative Economy
- Occupations: Actress, Singer, Business woman
- Years active: 2008–present
- Height: 1.60 m (5 ft 3 in)

Nqobile Sipamla (born 9 February 1984) is a South African actress, singer and businesswoman. She is best known for her roles in the television series Abo Mzala, MTV Shuga and Imbewu as thokozile.

== Personal life ==
Sipamla was born on 9 February 1984 in Pimville, Soweto, South Africa. Then she received her senior certificate from National School of the Arts. In 2012, she graduated with an Honours Degree in Live Performance from AFDA, The School for the Creative Economy in Johannesburg.

== Career ==
In 2008, she made her television debut with the second season of SABC3 comedy serial On the Couch, where she played the role of "Khanyi". Then in 2010, she made the role as "Zulu Teacher" in the SABC2 drama series The Mating Game. In 2011, she received the role "Mrs Khumalo" to play in the M-Net soapie The Wild. In the same year, she joined with the SABC1/SABC2 sitcom Abo Mzala and played the role "Thuli". For her role, she was nominated for the Best Actress Award in TV Comedy category at the South African Film and Television Awards (SAFTA). In the meantime, she joined with the SABC1 drama Sokhulu & Partners for the role "Tendi Mhloko". Apart from that, she was an active member of the Performance Role Play Training Senior team for many years.

In 2015, she appeared in the season two of e.tv soapie Ashes to Ashes for the supportive role "Detective Zungu". After that role, she joined with two more soapies Uzalo and Roer Jou Voete. In 2017, she played the role "Mam Phumzile" in the fifth season of SABC1 drama serial MTV Shuga. In 2019, she returned to the show to reprise her role in the ninth season. In 2018, she appeared in the SABC2 police procedural series The Docket and Mzansi Magic drama iKhaya, where she played the role "Cebile Sebatjane" in the latter. Then in 2019, she played the role "Thokozile" in the second season of e.tv soap opera Imbewu. After receiving popularity for the role, she continued to play the role in third and fourth seasons until 2021. After the exit from the soapie, she joined with the SABC soapie Generations.

Apart from acting, she co-owns a media and communications company called "Refhuge".

== Filmography ==
Year	Film	Role	Genre	Ref.
2008	On the Couch	Khanyi	TV series	
2010	The Mating Game	Zulu Teacher	TV series	
2011	The Wild	Mrs Khumalo	TV series	
2011	Abo Mzala	Thuli	TV series	
2011	Sokhulu & Partners	Tendi Mhloko	TV series	
2012	When a Child Dies (Moederskap)	Grace	Short film	
2015	Ashes to Ashes	Detective Zungu	TV series	
	Home Affairs	Tumi	TV series	
2015	Uzalo	Diana Dlamini	TV series	
2015	Roer Jou Voete	Lt. Sewela Soai	TV series	
2017	MTV Shuga	Mam Phumzile	TV series	
2018	The Docket	Rose	TV series	
2018	iKhaya	Cebile Sebatjane	TV series	
2019	Imbewu	Thokozile	TV series	
2021	Generations	Inyanga	TV series	
