= Podcast and Chill with MacG =

South African podcast

- Genre: Comedy Entertainment
- Country of origin: South Africa
- Language: English

Creative team
- Creative director: Turf Bester

Cast and voices
- Hosted by: Macgyver Mukwevho; Sol Phenduka; Ghost Lady

Production
- Camera: Neo Papi
- Production: Dudu Methula

Publication
- No. of episodes: 500+
- Original release: July 2018
- Provider: YouTube & Spotify

Related
- Related shows: Popcorn & Cheese Podcast
- Website: www.thisismacg.com

Podcast and Chill with MacG is a podcast under the Podcast and Chill Network owned and hosted by South African broadcaster, entrepreneur, podcaster and YouTuber Macgyver Mukwevho, better known as MacG. The first episode aired in July 2018 and its format is entertainment, education and comedy by encouraging celebrities and public figures to join the show for an interview and speak about their life.

== Network Weekly Lineup ==
Weekly Lineup
Show	Presenters	Days	Times	Genre
Podcast & Chill With MacG Monday Episode	MacG; Sol Phenduka	Monday	15:00	Pop Culture & News
Music Pulse	Thakgi; Sfiso; Nota	Tuesday	15:00	Music
Onside ZA Live	Marco; Tshepi; Len	Tuesday	21:00	Sports
People Need Comedy	Mpho Popps; Farieda; Tsitsi	Wednesday	15:00	Comedy
Podcast and Chill with MacG Interview Edition	MacG; Sol Phenduka	Thursday	15:00	Celebrity & Public Figure Interviews
Spreading Humours	Yanda Woods; Zille Wizzy; Naqueeda Dayel	Sunday	15:00	Social Media & Teen Lifestyle
Read The Room	Phil Mphela Londie London Shamiso Mosaka	Wednesday	20:00	Film & TV, Fashion, Pop Culture & Agony Aunt

== Hosts ==
The podcast is hosted by Macgyver Mukwevho as the main host, alongside Sol Phenduka and a host whose name is not revealed (referred to as the "Ghost Lady") as co-hosts. The Ghost Lady makes no appearance on the camera but takes part and plays an important role in the podcast

== Podcasting ==
The podcast invites celebrities and public figures to take part in Q&A sessions on the podcast.

Amongst the notable guests featured on Podcast and Chill were EFF president Julius Malema, actresses Pearl Thusi and Connie Chiume; actors Israel Matseke Zulu, Rapulana Seiphemo, and John Kani; rapper Emtee, flutist Wouter Kellerman; DJ Black Coffee and sports presenter Robert Marawa.

MacG has been favoured by listeners because of his sense of humour. Co-host Sol Phenduka has been named the master of puns due to his ongoing wordplay on the show.

The show also features a fact checker who also doesn't make any appearance on camera but validates information for the podcast topics.

The podcast airs its episodes on Mondays and Thursdays episodes which can be accessed on YouTube and Spotify.

The intro and outro theme voice over features Dr John Kani. The podcast uses the theme as an advertisement of MacG's liquor brand Grandeur.

== Divisions ==
The Podcast and Chill Network has more productions besides Podcast and Chill with MacG. The network also produces Popcorn and Cheese hosted by Mpho Popps Modikoane and Robot Boii the son of poet and singer Mzwakhe Mbuli. The network also produces City Girls with Tebogo Thobejane, Spreading Humours with Seemah, Yanda Woods and Zille.

== Ratings and awards ==
The podcast has numerous achievements and has been described as one of the leading podcasts in South Africa. Host MacG won the Podcaster of the year award at the 2021 VN Global Media and Entertainment Awards and the 2021 SA Social Media Dominance of the Year . The podcast has over 1 million subscribers on YouTube and is described as one of the biggest podcasts in the African continent.
