= Ntobeko Sishi =

South African actor and singer (born 1998)

Sishii
- Born: Ntobeko Senzesihle Sishi; 21 May 1998 (age 28); Durban, South Africa
- Education: University of Cape Town
- Occupations: actor; singer; songwriter; TV presenter
- Years active: 2018–present
- Musical career
- Genres: Pop; R&B; Afro-Soul
- Instruments: Vocals
- Website: sishiiofficial.com

Ntobeko Senzesihle Sishi (born 21 May 1998), professionally known as Sishii, is a South African singer-songwriter and actor. He is known for his breakthrough role as Ntokozo Dlamini in the Mzansi Magic telenovela Gomora.

== Early life and education ==
Ntobeko Senzesihle Sishi was born in Durban. He is of Zulu descent. Sishii lost his parents at a young age. He and his siblings were then raised by their maternal aunt. Sishii graduated with a Bachelor of Commerce in Economics and Finance from the University of Cape Town.

== Career ==
Sishii made his onscreen TV debut as TV presenter on SABC 2 teen talk show Hectic Nine-9 alongside Melody Gwala and Entle Bizana. He quickly became a fave and soon made his acting debut in the Mzansi Magic telenovela Gomora playing Ntokozo Dlamini alongside Thembi Seete, Katlego Danke and Connie Chiume from 2021 to 2023. He then started in the Netflix rom-com series Yoh! Christmas. In 2024 Sishi starred in the Netflix drama series GO! as Sizwe alongside Thandowethu Zondi, Wiseman Mncube and Dawn Thandeka King. He reunited with Thandowethu Zondi for another Netflix rom-com Love & Wine while being joined by Thando Thabethe, Masali Baduza and Bongile Mantsai in the cast.

In 2025, he starred in Laundry directed by Zamo Mkhwanazi. It closed the 41st Santa Barbara International Film Festival.

== Music ==
Sishii has spoken out on the importance of making music and finally find balance between story telling and music writing. He also revealed that he has been writing and making music before he got into television. He has since gone on to release music as an independent artists and in 2022 he released his debut EP A Night In The Hills. The EP was accompanied by his two singles "PreParty" and "I Don't Dance".

== Personal life ==
Sishii has opened up about battling anxiety and how he has survived the many times he has experienced suicidal ideation. He has urged others to take the time to help others in ways they have the power to.

Sishii is a born again Christian and got baptized in 2022 alongside actress Candice Modiselle.
