= MacG =

South African media personality and podcaster (born 1988)

- Born: MacGyver Pfunzo Mukwevho; November 7, 1988 (age 38); Limpopo, Siloam, South Africa
- Education: Hyde Park High School
- Occupations: Broadcaster; Podcaster; Radio DJ; Media entrepreneur
- Years active: 2000–present
- Known for: Podcast and Chill with MacG
- Website: www.thisismacg.com

MacGyver Mukwevho (born 6 November 1988) better known as "MacG", is a South African broadcaster, podcaster, radio DJ, media entrepreneur and author. He is best known as the creator and host of Podcast and Chill with MacG.

== Education and career ==
Mukwevho was born at Siloam Hospital in Limpopo. During his early years, he lived in Phadzima and Makwarela, staying with his grandmother. In 2000, he relocated to Johannesburg to live with his mother. He attended Hyde Park High School, where he developed an interest in media and performance.

=== Broadcasting ===
MacG began his media career at the age of 13 as a presenter on the youth TV show Craze (also stylized Craz-e) on e.tv from 2000 to 2005. He later worked in radio at Joburg City Community Radio (JBCCR) at Gandhi Square and at YFM, where he hosted early-morning, weekend “graveyard,” and lunchtime shows. In 2010, he was dismissed from YFM following a complaint lodged with the Broadcasting Complaints Commission of South Africa (BCCSA) regarding offensive remarks, despite issuing a public apology.

He later joined 947 (Highveld Stereo), where he hosted programmes including "Bloc Party" until around 2018.

=== Live DJ and performance ===
Beyond broadcasting, MacG established himself as a club DJ, touring countries such as Angola and Mozambique with MTV Base, and performing at major events like the MTV Africa Music Awards after-party in Nigeria. He has shared stages with international stars such as Diplo, Afrojack, David Guetta, and eminent local DJs like Black Coffee and Euphonik.

=== Podcasting ===
In July 2018, MacG launched Podcast and Chill with MacG under the Podcast and Chill Network. The show, hosted by MacG himself, Sol Phenduka, and a behind scene woman named “Ghost Lady”, features candid interviews with celebrities and public figures, blending entertainment with raw honesty and humour. By 2023, the podcast had surpassed 1 million YouTube subscribers, marking a major milestone for African podcasting, and had released over 500 episodes including celebrity interviews with the likes of Julius Malema, Pearl Thusi, Connie Chiume, Israel Matseke Zulu, Rapulana Seiphemo, John Kani, Emtee, Wouter Kellerman, Black Coffee, and Robert Marawa.

=== Television ===
Building on its digital success, in September 2021 the podcast began airing a special “Celebrity Edition” on Channel O (DStv Channel 320), featuring high-profile interviews and reaching TV audiences. By April 2024, MultiChoice expanded its digital reach by broadcasting Podcast and Chill with MacG on mainstream TV channels Mzansi Wethu and Mzansi Magic, bringing its signature raw conversations to larger audiences.

== Awards and recognition ==
In 2021, he won both Podcaster of the Year and SA Social Media Dominance of the Year at the VN Global Media & Entertainment Awards. He also won the Thumb Stopper Podcast award at the 2023 DStv Content Creator Awards.

== Controversies ==
=== Homophobia & Transphobia (2021) ===
In early 2021, both MacG and Sol Phenduka were dropped by sponsors (Old Mutual and Amstel) after making transphobic remarks and using derogatory language targeting the LGBTQI+ community on their podcast. The statements drew widespread condemnation for being "hateful and offensive."

=== R13M Defamation Lawsuit by Nkosazana Daughter (2024) ===
In July 2024, MacG insinuated on-air that the father of amapiano artist Nkosazana Daughter's child was not Sir Trill but Master KG, which led her to file a R13 million defamation lawsuit. She demanded a retraction and apologies. Though MacG issued an apology later, he also accused Sir Trill of being a “deadbeat” father, escalating the legal and public tension.

=== Misogynistic Remarks About Minnie Dlamini (2025) ===
In 2025, following controversial remarks about Minnie Dlamini, MultiChoice ceased broadcasting the podcast on DStv platforms. Deputy Minister Mmapaseka Steve Letsike publicly condemned the remarks, and although Parliament decided not to summon MacG, DStv’s removal of the show signaled the cost of provocative content. MacG offered a public apology and invited dialogue with Dlamini.

=== Economic Freedom Fighters ===
In May 2026, MacG criticized the Economic Freedom Fighters (EFF)'s position on immigration during an episode where he read from the EFF's manifesto, which states that the party would take up the struggles of immigrants, including economic migrants and asylum seekers, regardless of whether they were in South Africa legally or illegally. This prompted a response from Julius Malema who called the podcast a political party that aims to depoliticize the youth with the use of alcohol and vulgar language.

== Public image ==
MacG is both celebrated and critiqued for his forthright conversational style. He has cultivated a fan base known as the “Chillers.”
