= Charl Timotheus =

South African actor and producer (born 1982)

- Born: Charl Justin Timotheus; 1982 (age 43–44); Kimberley, South Africa
- Education: University of Cape Town
- Occupations: Actor, writer, producer
- Years active: 2000–present

Charl Justin Timotheus (born 1982) is a South African actor, copywriter, director, producer, screenwriter and content producer. He is best known for his role as Ziggy Arendse in the soap opera Backstage.

== Early life ==
Timotheus was born in Kimberley, South Africa. He graduated with his Bachelor of Arts degree in Film and Drama from the University of Cape Town.

== Career ==
Apart from television, he has appeared in stage plays such as Oedipus Rex, Resurrection of Lazarus, Kopano Residence Play, Charl Timotheus, Between the Lines, and The Passion.

In 2000, Timotheus joined the cast of e.tv. soap opera Backstage with the role Ziggy Arendse. The role became very popular where he played the role until the end of the show in 2007. Since 2005, his own show titled Tjooning was started within the same show Backstage. The show is five minutes long which includes Ziggy's opinion regarding the topic of the day. Besides, there is also a three-minute interview profiling the guest performers. The show made history with this show within the show, becoming the first time in soapie history, where an actor talking straight into camera and communicating with the viewers out there. Apart from Backstage, he also appeared in many television soapies and serials such as; Malan en Kie, Vallei van Sluiers I and II, Get Out Alive and Taryn & Sharon. In 2018, he joined with the cast of SABC2 soapie 7de Laan with the role "Dylan".

He also works as a content producer for Urban Brew Studios, and one of the senior YO-TV producers in charge of live shows.

== Filmography ==
Year	Film	Role	Genre	Ref.
2000	Backstage	Ziggy Arendse	TV series	
2008	Malan en Kie	Clyde	TV series	
2010	Vallei van Sluiers	Bertito Lopez	TV series	
2010	Get Out Alive	Hijacker	TV series	
2011	Vallei van Sluiers II	Bertito Lopez	TV series	
2013	Rhythm City	Wayne	TV series	
2017	Taryn & Sharon	Rocky	TV series	
2018	7de Laan	Dylan	TV series	
