= Youngins season 1 =

Youngins
- Season 1
- Starring: Ayakha Ntunja; Kealeboga Masango; Lebohang Lephatsoana; Thabiso Ramotshela; Toka Mtabane; Tabile Tau; Amogelang Telekelo; Kadia Banyini; Tshepo Matlala; Simo Magwaza; Sannah Mchunu; Keneilwe Matidze; Gaositoe Moloke
- No. of episodes: 45

Release
- Original network: Showmax
- Original release: 12 February – 16 May 2024

Season chronology
- Next → Season 2

The first season of the Showmax Original drama series Youngins premiered on 12 February 2024, and concluded on 16 May 2024, with a total of 45 episodes.

== Plot ==
Youngins focuses on the "Big 5's" bond as they break rules, sneak out to club parties, and share the traumas of their home lives (including Khaya's abusive father and Buhle's pastor father's grooming). The carefree high school drama takes a dark turn when Amo discovers the school's beloved Principal Mthembu is a predator grooming a student named Zintle.

== Cast and characters ==
=== Main ===
- Ayakha Ntunja as Amo
- Kealeboga Masango as Buhle
- Lebohang Lephatsoana as Tumelo
- Thabiso Ramotshela as Mahlatse
- Toka Mtabane as Khaya
- Tabile Tau as Sefako
- Amogelang Telekelo as Palesa
- Kadia Banyini as Mazambane (also known as. Mzambane)
- Tshepo Matlala as Tshepo
- Simo Magwaza as Mr. Ramathuba
- Sannah Mchunu as Matron Lulu
- Keneilwe Matidze as Pearl
- Gaositoe Moloke as Alex

=== Supporting ===
- Lihle Ngubo as Zintle
- Loyiso MacDonald as Principal Mthembu
- Baatseba Masela as Receptionist
- Ncibijani Madlala as Freddy
- Vuyani Mgungunyeka as Pastor Musa
- Sibongile Phakathi as Mamello
- Rantsatsi Rantsatsi as Detective Khumalo
- Maki Mokhitli as Mary
- Londiwe Nene as Aunti Thuli
- Thabo Setati as Security Guard
- Winnie Kunene as Lillian
- Albio Skhikwambane as Dorm Master
- Faith Ngubo Mrs. Tshabalala
- Koketso Mantshonyane as Uncle Snake Face
- Moeketsi Mokoena as Mazambane's Friend
- Ntwenhle Gumede as Lisa
- Sipho Mbele as Vusi
- Oratile Dithakgiso as Tshepi
- Linda Lukhele as Police Officer
- Tumelo Matlala as Sello
- Sazi Ndlovu as Glen High Learner
- Mapula Mokete as Lerato
- Reitumetse Moruri as Teacher
- Carol Tolo as Mrs. Hlatshwayo
- Mohau Mashala as Buhle's Friend
- Phakamani Mbuyazi as Maintenance Guy
- Vallery Rachosi as Aggressive Girl
- Kheziya Mthombeni as Choir Girl
- Tebogo Setati as Security Guard
- Sibongile Tshabalala as Matric Life Science Teacher
- Vusi Nkuna as Mr. Hlatshwayo
- Simon Lebaka as Prison Guard
- Bandile Mokoena as Hot UJ Guy
- Rethabile Mabalane as Grade 10 Girl
- Xoliswa Nxele as Lungile
- Mbuso Simelani as Bouncer
- Mary Chidi as Flirty Girl
- Brenda Ntanza as D.O.E
- Honey Madavhu as Gossip Girl
- Khensani Mabunda as Zinhle's Friend
- Toss as Musical Performer
- Tshepiso Modipa as Learner
- Collin Sepomatla as Unserious Uncle
- Madidmalo Monama as Nurse
- Naledi Mphahlele as IT Girl
- Thando Dube as Grade 10 Girl
- Karabo Ngubane as Thembeka
- Kgatoentle Dube as Luyanda
- Noxolo Tshabalala as Tuckshop Lady
- Karabo Mphuti as Bafana
- Nakisani Manenje as Zinhle's Friend
- Khaya Dube as Horny Boy
- Ntombifuthi Baloyi as Gossip Girl

== Episodes ==
No. overall	No. in season	Title	Directed by	Written by	Original release date
1	1	"This Is The Jungle, Boy!"	Unknown	Unknown	12 February 2024
2	2	"A Rude Awakening"	Unknown	Unknown	12 February 2024
3	3	"Good Time Not A Long Time"	Unknown	Unknown	12 February 2024
4	4	"Life Without Gwababa Is Sweet"	Unknown	Unknown	15 February 2024
5	5	"Game Time"	Unknown	Unknown	15 February 2024
6	6	"You Here For A Struggle Or Education"	Unknown	Unknown	15 February 2024
7	7	"I'm On To You"	Unknown	Unknown	22 February 2024
8	8	"Down The Rabbit Hole"	Unknown	Unknown	22 February 2024
9	9	"Long Overdue"	Unknown	Unknown	22 February 2024
10	10	"Easy Decisions, Tough Consequences"	Unknown	Unknown	29 February 2024
11	11	"Trapped"	Unknown	Unknown	29 February 2024
12	12	"Three Ciders"	Unknown	Unknown	29 February 2024
13	13	"Sex Education"	Unknown	Unknown	7 March 2024
14	14	"The Stages Of Grief"	Unknown	Unknown	7 March 2024
15	15	"In Or Out?"	Unknown	Unknown	7 March 2024
16	16	"Loyalty"	Unknown	Unknown	14 March 2024
17	17	"How To Catch A Paedophile"	Unknown	Unknown	14 March 2024
18	18	"When It Rains It Pours"	Unknown	Unknown	14 March 2024
19	19	"Sorrows, Sorrows,Prayers"	Unknown	Unknown	21 March 2024
20	20	"There's Someone At The Door"	Unknown	Unknown	21 March 2024
21	21	"Heart Wants What It Wants"	Unknown	Unknown	21 March 2024
22	22	"Everyone Going Through Changes"	Unknown	Unknown	28 March 2024
23	23	"The Chaos Before The Storm"	Unknown	Unknown	28 March 2024
24	24	"Be My Valentine"	Unknown	Unknown	28 March 2024
25	25	"Homewrecker"	Unknown	Unknown	4 April 2024
26	26	"Cash In!"	Unknown	Unknown	4 April 2024
27	27	"Mother Of Parties"	Unknown	Unknown	4 April 2024
28	28	"Emotional Baggage"	Unknown	Unknown	11 April 2024
29	29	"Hearstrings And Hard Choices"	Unknown	Unknown	11 April 2024
30	30	"Unlesh The Baddie Era"	Unknown	Unknown	11 April 2024
31	31	"The Song Of War And Heartbreak"	Unknown	Unknown	18 April 2024
32	32	"Can't Hide The Truth"	Unknown	Unknown	18 April 2024
33	33	"Stuck Between A Rock And A Hard Place"	Unknown	Unknown	18 April 2024
34	34	"Don't Let Me Down"	Unknown	Unknown	25 April 2024
35	35	"Trust Is Earned"	Unknown	Unknown	25 April 2024
36	36	"Plan A Birth Plan B"	Unknown	Unknown	25 April 2024
37	37	"House Of Cards"	Unknown	Unknown	2 May 2024
38	38	"State Your Case"	Unknown	Unknown	2 May 2024
39	39	"Reality O'clock"	Unknown	Unknown	2 May 2024
40	40	"The Downside Of Being Back Home"	Unknown	Unknown	9 May 2024
41	41	"Welcome To The Real World"	Unknown	Unknown	9 May 2024
42	42	"Busted"	Unknown	Unknown	9 May 2024
43	43	"Farewell, Fighting Spirit"	Unknown	Unknown	16 May 2024
44	44	"The Gloves Come Off"	Unknown	Unknown	16 May 2024
45	45	"Together Forever"	Unknown	Unknown	16 May 2024

== Production ==
=== Development ===
On 30 January 2024, Showmax announced Youngins as Tshedza Pictures third production on the streaming platform, after the success of Adulting. Following the announcement, the lead director of the series was revealed as Themba Mfebe. The creator of the series was led by Gwydion Beynon, and Phathutshedzo Makwarela.

=== Casting ===
The cast was reported following the announcement of the first season, with a line-up of Kealeboga Masango, Lebohang Lephatsoana, Toka Mtabane, Thabiso Ramotshela, Tabile Tau, Tshepo Matlala, Lihle Ngubo, Katlego Moloke, Loyiso MacDonald, Sanna Mchunu, and Keneilwe Matidze.

== Reception ==
=== Awards and nominations ===
Year	Award	Category	Recipient	Result	Ref
2024	National Film & TV Awards	Best Newcomer	Keabetswe Masango (Youngins season 1)	Nominated	
