= Youngins season 2 =

Youngins
- Season 2
- Starring: Ayakha Ntunja; Kealeboga Masango; Lebohang Lephatsoana; Thabiso Ramotshela; Toka Mtabane; Tabile Tau; Amogelang Telekelo; Kadia Banyini; Tshepo Matlala; Simo Magwaza; Sannah Mchunu; Keneilwe Matidze; Gaositoe Moloke
- No. of episodes: 45

Release
- Original network: Showmax
- Original release: 15 November 2024 – 21 February 2025

Season chronology
- ← Previous; Season 1 Next → Season 3

The second season of the South African teen drama tv series Youngins began streaming on 15 November 2024, with 45 episodes like the previous season, and concluded on 21 February 2025, starring Ayakha Ntunja, Kealeboga Masango, Lebohang Lephatsoana, Thabiso Ramotshela, Toka Mtabane, Tabile Tau, Amogelang Telekelo, Kadia Banyini, Tshepo Matlala, Simo Magwaza, Sannah Mchunu, Keneilwe Matidze, and Gaositoe Moloke.

== Plot ==
The season focuses on the main characters growing up as they deal with the devastating consequences of their fight for justice in the previous season, while grappling with new forms of betrayal, addiction, and blackmail.

== Cast and characters ==
=== Main ===
- Ayakha Ntunja as Amo
- Kealeboga Masango as Buhle
- Lebohang Lephatsoana as Tumelo
- Thabiso Ramotshela as Mahlatse
- Toka Mtabane as Khaya
- Tabile Tau as Sefako
- Amogelang Telekelo as Palesa
- Kadia Banyini as Mazambane (also known as. Mzambane)
- Tshepo Matlala as Tshepo
- Simo Magwaza as Mr. Ramathuba
- Sannah Mchunu as Matron Lulu
- Keneilwe Matidze as Pearl
- Gaositoe Moloke as Alex

=== Supporting ===
- Baatseba Masela as Receptionist
- Eyethu Myeza as Lesedi
- Ncibijani Madlala as Freddy
- Sibongile Phakathi as Mamello
- Rantsatsi Rantsatsi as Detective Khumalo
- Londiwe Nene as Aunti Thuli
- Ayanda Sishuba as Banele
- Gomolemo Tsatsi as Buhle's Friend
- Winnie Kunene as Lillian
- Loungo Masire as Palesa Mum
- Nqobile Magwaza as Social Worker
- Natasha Hlungwana as Buhle's Friend
- Faith Ngubo Mrs. Tshabalala
- Katlego Mzizi as Buhle's Friend
- Moeketsi Mokoena as Mazambane's Friend
- Linda Lukhele as Police Officer
- Ukho Samela as Innocent Boy
- Sazi Ndlovu as Glen High Learner
- Reitumetse Moruri as Teacher
- Katleho Mabote as Tokollo
- Kheziya Mthombeni as Choir Girl
- Sibusiso Sibeko as Uniformed Police
- Ofentse Mohlare as Horny Boy
- Tebogo Tsweu as Themba
- Masego Mekgwe as Asanda
- Lerato Ngcobo as Tuckhop Lady
- Sijabulisiwe Khumalo as Neo
- Simphiwe Sip Nkabinde as Magistrate Mthimkhulu
- Vuyani Mgugunyeka as Pastor Musa

== Episodes ==
No. overall	No. in season	Title	Directed by	Written by	Original release date
46	1	"New Term, New Disorder"	Unknown	Unknown	15 November 2024
47	2	"The Heroes Of Olifants"	Unknown	Unknown	15 November 2024
48	3	"Embers Of Sorrow"	Unknown	Unknown	15 November 2024
49	4	"Little Fires Everywhere"	Unknown	Unknown	22 November 2024
50	5	"The Haunting Reality"	Unknown	Unknown	22 November 2024
51	6	"Case Closed"	Unknown	Unknown	22 November 2024
52	7	"Can't Run"	Unknown	Unknown	29 November 2024
53	8	"Time To Confess"	Unknown	Unknown	29 November 2024
54	9	"A Necessary Evil"	Unknown	Unknown	29 November 2024
55	10	"What He Doesn't Know Won't Hurt Him"	Unknown	Unknown	6 December 2024
56	11	"Actions & Consequences"	Unknown	Unknown	6 December 2024
57	12	"Forever Yena"	Unknown	Unknown	6 December 2024
58	13	"Don't Read The Comment Section"	Unknown	Unknown	13 December 2024
59	14	"The Mastermind"	Unknown	Unknown	13 December 2024
60	15	"Caught In 4k"	Unknown	Unknown	13 December 2024
61	16	"Splitsville"	Unknown	Unknown	20 December 2024
62	17	"When The Cookie Crumbles"	Unknown	Unknown	20 December 2024
63	18	"Buckle Up, S'febe"	Unknown	Unknown	20 December 2024
64	19	"Heartbreak High"	Unknown	Unknown	27 December 2024
65	20	"Loose Ends And New Beginnings"	Unknown	Unknown	27 December 2024
66	21	"The Gift That Keeps On Taking"	Unknown	Unknown	27 December 2024
67	22	"I Want Some More"	Unknown	Unknown	3 January 2025
68	23	"Rekindled Fires"	Unknown	Unknown	3 January 2025
69	24	"On A High"	Unknown	Unknown	3 January 2025
70	25	"Dala What You Must"	Unknown	Unknown	10 January 2025
71	26	"Be Gay, Do Crimes"	Unknown	Unknown	10 January 2025
72	27	"Clock Is Ticking"	Unknown	Unknown	10 January 2025
73	28	"No's Not An Option"	Unknown	Unknown	17 January 2025
74	29	"The Chickens Have Come Home To Roost"	Unknown	Unknown	17 January 2025
75	30	"See You In Hell, Ke Sisi!"	Unknown	Unknown	17 January 2025
76	31	"That Closet Door'S Already Been Unlocked"	Unknown	Unknown	24 January 2025
77	32	"Put The Blame On Me"	Unknown	Unknown	24 January 2025
78	33	"The Last Resort"	Unknown	Unknown	24 January 2025
79	34	"You Should'Ve Let Me Die"	Unknown	Unknown	31 January 2025
80	35	"The Cat's Out The Bag"	Unknown	Unknown	31 January 2025
81	36	"Reckless Actions Have Bitter Consequences"	Unknown	Unknown	31 January 2025
82	37	"Blurred Lines"	Unknown	Unknown	7 February 2025
83	38	"Tearstorm"	Unknown	Unknown	7 February 2025
84	39	"Till New Secrets Do Us Part!"	Unknown	Unknown	7 February 2025
85	40	"Back And Badder Than Ever"	Unknown	Unknown	14 February 2025
86	41	"It Is Only The Beginning"	Unknown	Unknown	14 February 2025
87	42	"When It Rains, It Pours"	Unknown	Unknown	14 February 2025
88	43	"More Fires, More Problems"	Unknown	Unknown	21 February 2025
89	44	"The Truth Burns"	Unknown	Unknown	21 February 2025
90	45	"We Die Together"	Unknown	Unknown	21 February 2025

== Production ==
=== Development ===
In November 2024, Showmax and Tshedza Pictures confirmed a second season, after the success of the first season.

The creator of the series was led by Gwydion Beynon, and Phathutshedzo Makwarela.

=== Casting ===
The second season had thirteen main roles receiving star billing, all returning from the previous season.
