= Ama Qamata =

South African actress (born 1998)

Amamkele Qamata
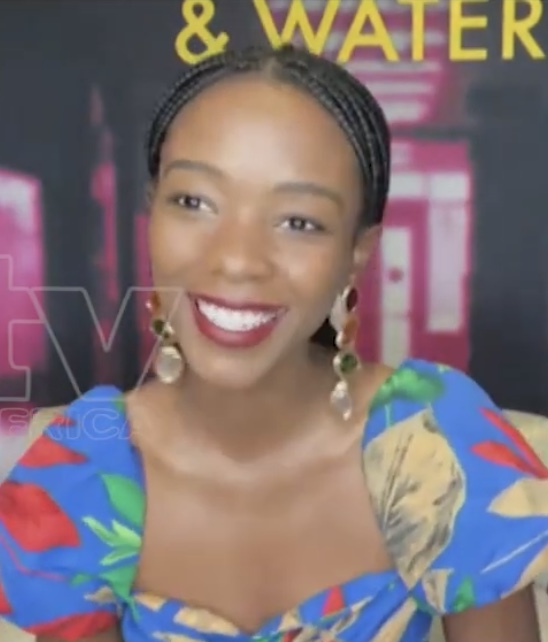
- Qamata on Plus TV Africa in 2020
- Born: Amamkele Lithemba Qamata; 2 September 1998 (age 27); Cala, Eastern Cape, South Africa
- Education: University of Cape Town
- Occupation: Actress
- Years active: 2015–present
- Awards: S.A style awards, 2020

Amamkele Lithemba Qamata (born 2 September 1998) is known as a South African actress. She is best known for her roles as Buhle Ndaba in the Mzansi Magic series Gomora and Puleng Khumalo in the hit Netflix series Blood & Water.

== Early life and education ==
Qamata was born in the Eastern Cape village of Cala in the Sakhisizwe Local Municipality. She moved to Johannesburg with her family at the age of three.

Qamata discovered acting through a school productions and first appeared on screen in advertisements. She is an alumna of Reddam House Bedfordview; after passing her matriculation in 2016, she took a gap year. She enrolled at the University of Cape Town for a Theatre and Performance degree, but withdrew from the institution during her second year.

== Career ==
In 2016, aged 17, Qamata made her television acting debut as Naledi in the situation comedy My Perfect Family on SABC1.

In 2020 she was in the cast of Gomora, as the character of Buhle in the Mzansi Magic series.

Later that year she appeared in Netflix's Blood & Water. Qamata's character, Puleng, has a sister who was abducted at birth, and Puleng is trying to prove that the successful swimmer from a private school and rich family is in fact her sister. Kutlwano Ditsele, the casting director for Blood & Water, was executive producer on Gomora and invited Qamata to audition, which she did successfully.

Qamata has also had roles in Rhythm City and Commandos: The Mission. Qamata is set to star in Matthew Leutwyler's upcoming sports film Fight Like a Girl alongside Hakeem Kae-Kazim.

== Filmography ==
Key
| † | Denotes productions that have not yet been released |

=== Film ===
| Year | Title | Role | Ref |
|---|---|---|---|
| 2023 | Fight Like A Girl | Safi | |
| TBA | Boyz Trip † | In Production(TBA) | |

Television

| Year | Title | Role | Notes | Ref. |
|---|---|---|---|---|
| 2016 | My Perfect Family | Naledi | Recurring role | |
| 2018 | Our Girl | Grace | Series 3 part 2 episode 2 | |
| 2018 | Rhythm City | Thandi | Recurring role | |
| 2020–2022 | Gomora | Nobuhle Ndaba | Main role | |
| 2020–2024 | Blood & Water | Puleng Khumalo | Main role | |
| 2025–Present | Marked | Palesa | Main role | |

== Accolades ==
| Year | Award | Category | Work | Result | Ref |
|---|---|---|---|---|---|
| 2020 | S.A Style Awards | The Next Big Thing | Herself | Won | |
| 2020 | Séries Brasil Awards | Revelação Do Ano | Blood & Water | | |
| 2023 | The Future Awards Africa | Prize for Acting | Herself | Won | |
