= The Four of Us =

The Four of Us may refer to:

- The 4 of Us, a rock band from Newry, County Down, Northern Ireland
- The Four of Us (film), a 2021 German film
- The Four of Us (TV series), an upcoming South African TV series
