= 2022 DStv Mzansi Viewers' Choice Awards =

Film event in South Africa

2022 DStv Mzansi Viewers Choice Awards
- Date: June 25, 2022
- Location: Sun Arena, South Africa
- Hosted by: Lawrence Maleka

Highlights
- Most wins: Makhadzi (2); Lawrence Maleka (2)
- Website: https://www.mzansimagic.tv/dstvmvca

Television/radio coverage
- Network: Mzansi Magic

The 2022 DStv Mzansi Viewers' Choice Awards were the 4th annual DStv Magic Viewers Choice Awards. The ceremony was held at Sun Arena, South on June 25, 2022. The event recognized the biggest achievements in television, radio, music, sports, and comedy in South Africa. The nominations and host were revealed via a virtual livestream on April 14, 2022.

== Performances ==
List of musical performances
Artist(s)	Song(s)
Pre-show
Nomfundo Moh	"Phakade Lam"
Nomfundo Moh	"Soft Life"
Main show
Tuks Senganga; Nomfundo Moh	"526 000 Minutes"
Sjava	"Umcebo"
Sun-El Musician; Msaki	"Ubomi Abumanga "
Mthandazo Gatya	"Jikelele"
Boohle	"Ngixolele"
Pabi Cooper	"Banyana Ke Bafana"
Kamo Mphela	"Nkulunkulu"
Kamo Mphela	"Ghost"
Mduduzi Ncube; Siya Ntuli; Lwah Ndlunkulu	"Lala Ngoxolo"
Q-Mark; TpZee; Afriikan Papi	"Paris"
Reece Madlisa; Zuma; Beast RSA	"Iy'ntsimbi Zase Envy"
Que DJ; Madanon	"P.A.B (People Are Burning)"
Zakes Bantwini; Skye Wanda; Nana Atta	"Amadolo"
Zakes Bantwini; Skye Wanda; Nana Atta	"Girl In The Mirror"
Zakes Bantwini; Skye Wanda; Nana Atta	"iMali"
Zakes Bantwini; Skye Wanda; Nana Atta	"Osama"

== Presenters ==
- Presley Chweneyagae and Nomsa Buthelezi — presented Favorite Comedian
- Kwezi Ndlovu and Theo Baloyi - presented Favorite DJ
- Ayanda Thabethe and Bryan Habana - presented Favorite sports personality
- Lasizwe and Sannah Mchunu - presented Favorite rising star
- Ntando Duma - presented Favorite TV presenter
- Somizi and Vusi Kunene - presented Favorite music artist or group
- Clement Moasa - presented Favorite song
- Boity and Themba - presented Favorite radio personality
- Nyiko Shiburi - presented Enriching Life Award
- Lerato Kganyago and DJ Ph - presented Best Actor
- T-Bo Touch and Mphowabadimo - presented Best Actress
- Khutso Theledi and Siphesihle Ndaba - presented Favorite personality
- Nthati Moshesh and Motshabi Tyelele - presented DStv Legend Award
- Kgomotso Christopher and Lunga Siyo - presented Ultimate Viewers' Choice

== Winners and nominees ==
Below the list are the nominees and winners listed first in bold.

Favourite song	Favourite TV presenter	Favourite comedian
**Makhadzi ft Prince Benza - Ghanama**; Zakes Bantwini and Kasango – "Osama"; Kabza De Small and DJ Maphorisa ft Ami Faku – "Asibe Happy"; Young Stunna ft Kabza De Small and DJ Maphorisa - "Adiwele"; Big Zulu ft Intaba Yase Dubai and Riky Rick - Imali Eningi	**Lawrence Maleka**; Motshidisi Mohono; Leanne Manas; Thembekile Mrototo; Thuso Motaung	**Skhumba Hlophe**; Mpho Popps; Celeste Ntuli; Nina Hastie; Mashabela
Favourite rising star	Favourite radio personality	Favourite actor
**Kwenzo Ngcobo**; Hope Mbhele; Young Stunna; Uncle Vinny; Daliwonga	**Selby “Selbeyonce” Mkhize**; Thomas Msengana and Skhumba; Lerato Kganyago; Thando Thabethe; Sphectacula & DJ Naves	**Abdul Khoza**; Zolisa Xaluva; Thapelo Sebogodi; Bonko Khoza; Vusi Kunene
Favourite actress	Favourite music artist/group	Favourite DJ
**Sannah Mchunu**; Zikhona Sodlaka; Deli Malinga; Shoki Mmola; Thembi Seete	**Makhadzi**; Hle; Zakes Bantwini; Big Zulu; Scorpion Kings	**DJ Shimza**; Scorpion Kings; DBN Gogo; Major League DJz; De Mthuda
Favourite sports personality	Favourite personality	Multichoice Enriching Life Award
**Rassie Erasmsus**; Ntando Mahlangu; Pitso Mosimane; Temba Bavuma; Benni McCarthy	**Connie Ferguson**; Makhadzi; Shauwn Mkhize; DBN Gogo; LaSizwe	**Amantle Vikwane**
DStv Legend Award	Ultimate Viewers' Choice	
**Dr John Kani**	**Lawrence Maleka**	
