= Gomora (TV series) =

South African television drama series

- Genre: Drama; Crime; Thriller
- Created by: Gwydion Beynon; Phathutshedzo Makwarela; Kutlwano Ditsele; Amanda Lane
- Written by: Gwydion Beynon; Phathutshedzo Makwarela; Chris Q Radebe
- Starring: Katlego Danke; Connie Chiume; Zolisa Xaluva; Sannah Mchunu; Thembi Seete; Siphesihle Ndaba; Ntobeko Sishi; Sicelo Buthelezi; Siyasanga Papu; Lerato Mokoka; Ama Qamata; Siya Xaba; Khaya Mthembu; Leera Mthethwa; Themba Ndaba; Israel Matseke Zulu; Buyile Mdladla; Thulani Mtsweni; Nandipha Khubone; Ntandazo Mnyandi; Fezile Makhanya; Ayanda Daweti; Senzo Radebe; Gaoisi Raditholo; Tema Sebopedi; Lebogang Mphahlele; Sihle Ndaba; Robert Mpisi; Moshe Ndiki; Unathi Guma; Zinzi Nsele; Velile Makhoba; Sizwe Khhubeka; Siyabonga Zubane
- Composers: Zethu Mashika and IShowSpeed
- Country of origin: South Africa
- Original languages: Tswana; Zulu; French
- No. of seasons: 4
- No. of episodes: 1,040

Production
- Executive producers: Kutlwano Ditsele; Thabang Moleya; Leanne Kumalo
- Producers: Lulu Hela; Kutlwano Ditsele
- Running time: 22–24 minutes
- Production company: Seriti Films

Original release
- Network: Mzansi Magic
- Release: 30 March 2020 – 20 October 2023

Related
- Isithembiso

Gomora is a South African television drama series that premiered on Mzansi Magic It was first broadcast on March 30, 2020. The series was set in the township of Alexandra, north of Johannesburg hence the name of the series, and explores the disparity between the rich and the poor in South Africa. It was created by Kutlwano Ditsele, Thabang Moleya, and Leanne Kumalo, and produced by Seriti Films.

The series follows the story of inequality, crime, murder and how one's betrayal can cause a change of lifestyle to another. M-Net's lineup. Starring Connie Chiume as Mam' Sonto Molefe and Thembi Seete as Gladys Dlamini, Sannah Mchunu, Siyasanga Papu and Katlego Danke. The drama series replaced Isthembiso, which had not been renewed for a fourth season. The series told the story of two families living different lifestyles and how crime changed one's lifestyle.

The series concluded on 20 October 2023.

== Plot ==
The series tells the story of two families, one of a man who has made his riches and success by illegal means from a bank he owns, the other of a man well-respected in the community who struggles to make ends meet. Their two worlds collide in a botched hijacking attempt which sets their lives into a serious downward spiral.

The series explores the themes of social economic issues, the disparity between the lower and upper-class members of South African society, the contrast between them being brought to life through particularly innovative filming styles.

== Main cast ==
Actors	Characters	Seasons					
Actors	Characters	1	2	3	4	5	6
Sindi Dlathu	Lindiwe Dlamini-Dikana	Main	Main	Main	Main	Main	Main
Presley Chweneyagae	Thuso Mokoena	Main	Main	Main	Main	Main	Main
Hlomla Dandala	Zweli Dikana	Main	Main	Main	Main	Main	Recurring
Tinah Mnumzana	Flora Moloi	Main	Main	Main	Main	Main	Main
Thembinkosi Mthembu	Mathatho Dimba			Main	Main	Main	Main
Galaletsang Koffman	Beauty	Main	Main	Main	Main	Main	Main
Lawrence Maleka	Zolani Dlamini	Main	Main	Main	Main	Main	
Matshepo Sekgopi	Dimpho Mokoena	Main	Main	Main	Main	Main	Main
Tsholofelo Matshaba	Kedibone Mokoena		Main	Main	Main	Main	Main
Lunga Mofokeng	Andile Dikana-Sibiya	Main	Main	Main	Main	Main	Main
Lunathi Mampofu	Emmarentia Dlamini			Recurring	Main	Main	
Tango Ncetezo	Paulina Dlomo	Main	Main	Main	Main	Main	
Bheki Mkhwane	Bukhosi Hlophe					Main	Main
Brenda Mhlongo	Nomafu Hlophe					Main	Main
Tina Dlathu	Khewzi Hlophe					Recurring	Main
Unathi Mkhize	Nkanyiso Hlophe					Main	Main
Vuyo Biyela	Mlilo Hlophe					Main	Main
Nokuthula Ledwaba	Angelina Mthobeni	Recurring	Main	Main	Main	Main	Main
Thapelo Sebogodi	Khabzela	Main	Main	Main	Main	Main	Recurring
Thabiso Ramotshela	Morena Mokoena			Recurring	Main	Main	Main
Chuck Shisane	Sbusiso Tshabalala	Recurring	Recurring	Recurring	Recurring	Main	Main
Ferry Jele	Veronica Dlamini	Recurring	Recurring	Recurring	Recurring	Recurring	Main
Tshepo Seogiso	Charlie	Guest	Recurring	Recurring	Recurring	Recurring	Main
Siya Sepotokele	Njabulo Sibiya	Recurring	Recurring	Recurring	Recurring	Recurring	

== Former Cast ==
Actor	Role	Notes
Larona Moagi	Tumi Mokoena	(main role; season 1 - 3)
Linda Mtoba	Nomonde Dikana	(main role; Season 1 - 4, recurring role; season 5)
Jessica Sithole	Nyakallo Kgomo	(recurring role; season 4)
Mary-Anne Barlow	Gail Mathabatha	(recurring role; season 2)
Lunga Shabalala	Lindani Dlomo	(main role; Season 1-3)
Kagiso Rathebe	Keith	(Recurring role: Season 5)
Don Mlangeni Nawa	Thato Mokoena	(recurringrole; Season 1), guest role; Season 3)
Jet Novuka	Walter Khanyisa	(recurring role; season 1)
Mavuso Magabane	Ntsizwa Dimba	(recurring role; Season 3)
Zenokuhle Maseko	Mbali Dikana	(Main role; Season 1 - 2)
Kenned Sted	Goliath	(recurring role; season 1)
Seipati Motshwane	Augustine Modipa	(recurring role; season 3)
Renate Stuurman	Sheree Jacobson	(recurring role; season 1)
TK Sebothoma	Happy Moloi	Main role; season 1)
Anele Zondo	Faith Sibiya	(main role; Seasons 1-2), recurring role season 5
Fezile Makhanya	Mnqobi	(recurring role; season 5)
Zolani Phakade	Mkhize	(recurring role; season 1)
Sannah Mchunu	Matilda Shabangu	(recurring role; season 1-2)
Lebohang Tlokana	Dora Phakathi	recurring role; season 1-2)
Warren Masemola	Oupa Manamela	(recurring role; season 1-4)
Zenzo Ngqobe	Percy Motoung	(recurring role; season 1-4)
Thato Malema	Ten Ten	(recurring role; season 1-2
Seputla Sebogodi	Mohumi Ditshweni	(recurring role; season 3-4)
Connie Ferguson	Harriet Khoza	(recurring role; season 1)

== Current Opening theme ==
As Shown on Opening theme Season 4

- Connie Chiume as NomaSonto Molefe (exited)
- Thembi Seete as Gladys Dlamini
- Senzo Radebe as Zibuko
- Sannah Mchunu as Zodwa Zondo
- Scelo Buthelezi as Sbusiso Teddy Zondo
- Siyasanga Papu as Pretty Molefe - Madida
- Fezile Makhanya as Nkosinathi Cele
- Lerato Maroka as Tshiamo Madida

== Previous Opening Theme ==
Cast shown on previous seasons

Season 1

- Katlego Danke as Thathi Molefe - Ndaba
- Zolisa Xaluva as Melusi Dlamini
- Connie Chiume as Sonto Molefe
- Thembi Seete as Gladys Dlamini
- Ntobeko Sishi as Ntokozo Dlamini
- Siphesihle Ndaba as Mazet
- Ama Qamata as Buhle Ndaba
- Siya Xaba as Langa Ndaba
- Scelo Buthelezi as Sibusiso Teddy Zondo

Season 2

- Katlego Danke as Thathi Molefe - Ndaba
- Zolisa Xaluva as Melusi Dlamini
- Connie Chiume as Sonto Molefe
- Thembi Seete as Gladys Dlamini
- Sannah Mchunu as Zodwa Zondo
- Scelo Bhuthelezi as Sbusiso Teddy Zondo
- Ntobeko Sishi as Ntokozo Dlamini
- Siphesihle Ndaba as Mazet
- Israel Matseke-Zulu as Don Bhuthelezi
- Buyile Mdladla as Phumlani Ndaba

Season 3

- Katlego Danke as Thathi Molefe - Ndaba
- Connie Chiume as Sonto Molefe
- Thembi Seete as Gladys Dlamini
- Ntobeko Sishi as Ntokozo Dlamini
- Siphesihle Ndaba as MaZet
- Sannah Mchunu as Zodwa Zondo
- Scelo Buthelezi as Teddy Zondo
- Siyasanga Papu as Pretty Molefe
- Fezile Makhanya as Nkosinathi Cele

== Cast ==
The cast consists of several South African Known actors, with a few new additions.

- Thathi Molefe - Ndaba (Katlego Danke)

Mbongeni's trophy wife and Melusi's high school sweetheart. She has managed to escape her lowly, humble township roots and was living the highlife as a socialite in Sandton. She was married to CEO and major shareholder of CBS Bank, Mbongeni Ndaba (Themba Ndaba), who is found guilty of fraud. His death in a botched hijacking attempt brings her back into the Kasi lifestyle. She has a child called Phodiso. She left Gomora to ensure that her baby is safe after MaZet attempted to murder her daughter to spite Sonto. She went to jail for killing MaZet out of anger (main role; season 1 - 3)

- Melusi Dlamini (Zolisa Xaluva)

An upright, strict father. He had a previous relationship with Thathi and is now married to Gladys. He was a principal in a local high school. He expects his son to be an overachiever. He is looked upon by the community as a respected man, though his household can barely make ends meet. He is the patriarch of the Dlamini household. He dirvoced Gladys. He was arrested for killing Phumlani Which he was protecting Thathi. (main role; season 1 - 2)

- Mam'Sonto Molefe (Connie Chiume)

She is Thathi and Preety's mother. She is the puppet master in the township who orchestrated the hijacking which ultimately led to her son-in-law 's death. She is the matriarch of the Molefe family. She is the most feared woman in Alexandra. She was shot - dead by Zibuko (main role; season 1 - 4)

- Gladys Dlamini (Thembi Seete)

A street-smart and tough social worker who believes in uplifting the community. She mediates the conflict between father and son in their home. Gladys feels insecure about Melusi and Thathi's relationship because Thathi is Melusi's high school sweetheart. She dirvoced Melusi. She is in a relationship with Nkosinathi. (Main role: season 1 - present)

- Zanele "MaZet" Thwala (Siphesihle Ndaba)

A female expert on hijacking cars trained by Mam'Sonto. She has lured Ntokozo into a life of crime and has a history with Ntokozo's dad. She is in a relationship with Zibuko, which led her to trying to kill Thathi's son to spite Mam'Sonto for killing her mother Lulama. She was killed by Thathi in the season 3's 259th episode. (Main role: season 1 - 3)

- Ntokozo Dlamini (Ntobeko Sishi)

The son of Melusi and Gladys who seeks affection from his father Melusi, to no avail. Thus he joins a band of criminals and is involved in the botched hijacking, being responsible for pulling the trigger. His mood and habit changes, which becomes noticeable to his parents. He was in an unstable relationship with Buhle and Zanele (MaZet) .(Main role: season 1 - 3)

- Buhle Ndaba (Ama Qamata)

Buhle was Thathi's spoilt daughter. She finds herself in the township on account of his father's missing payments on school fees and life insurance. She was previously in an unstable relationship with Ntokozo. Buhle has since left the show, saying she had to study with her best friend in Durban. She came back for Langa's funeral. She was killed by Qhoqhoqho at the taxi rank in season 3. (Main role: season 1 - 2; guest role: season 3)

- Langa Ndaba (Siya Xaba)

Langa was Thathi and Melusi's son. The first born of the family who also turns out to be Principal Dlamini's son. Langa is the more level-headed child between him and Buhle. He was friends with Teddy and Ntokozo. He was killed by Gladys in a fire at Mam'Sonto's tavern. (Main role: season 1, recurring role: season 2)

- Sibusiso "Teddy" Zondo (Sicelo Buthelezi)

Teddy is a teenager who has been adopted by Gladys and Melusi due to the fact that his mother (Zodwa) drinks a lot. Teddy was born with fetal alcohol syndrome, which causes him to be a slow learner. Teddy is friends with Ntokozo and Langa. As the show goes on, it shows that male rape exists as Teddy is raped by Gladys' friend Ms Manzi (a young and attractive teacher) and he undergoes severe psychological and social problems while dealing with it. He is currently dating Tshiamo. (Main role: season 1 - present)

- Pretty Molefe - Madida (Siyasanga Papu)

Thathi's younger sister. She carries resentment towards her as she has been in her sister's shadow all her life. As the show progresses, Thati and Pretty are shown to have a better sibling relationship. Pretty is mother to Tshiamo and is Sbonga’s wife.(Main role: season 1 - present)

- Tshiamo Madida (Lerato Mokoka)

She is the daughter of Pretty Molefe and Sbonga Madida who is also the son in-law of Mam' Sonto. Tshiamo had a difficult relationship with Langa and Buhle in the beginning, but they have all grown closer with Tshiamo being very close to Langa. She is currently in a relationship with Teddy. (recurring role: season 1, main role: season 2 - present)

- Zodwa Zondo (Sannah Mchunu)

Zodwa is a recovering alcoholic and is Teddy’s mother. She was best friends with Gladys in High School. Due to her addiction to alcohol, Zodwa was taken to rehab and came back to work for Melusi and Gladys. She can be fierce at times, especially when she feels provoked by Gladys. She and Teddy have a very close relationship. As the show goes on, she dates Bongani. She returned to being an alcoholic due to stress.(Recurring role: season 1, main role: season 2 - present)

- Sbonga Madida (Khaya Mthembu)

Sbonga is Pretty’s husband and Tshiamo’s father. He works at Sonto’s tavern and he is cohabiting with Pretty in Sonto’s house. This makes him subject to ridicule by community members. He dreams of taking Pretty and Tshiamo out of Gomora. (recurring role: season 1 - present)

- Jackie Hlungwani (Leera Mthethwa)

A no-nonsense teacher at Gomora High School that has a close working relationship with Melusi Dlamini. Jackie has been seen to be very intuitive when something seems to be wrong with her students.(Recurring role: season 1 - present). She decide to shout student at school because she's going through rough time at home with her own boyfriend which is a Grade 11 teacher.

== Impact of Covid-19 on production ==
Just months after the show aired, Gomora was one of the first South African TV shows to be pulled from broadcasting after a production break due to COVID-19 lockdown regulations in South Africa.
