= Ayakha =

- Gender: feminine or masculine

Origin
- Region of origin: Africa

Ayakha is a Xhosa given name meaning "to build or to construct". Notable people with the name include:

- Ayakha Melithafa (born 2001 or 2002) South African climate activist
- Ayakha Ntunja (born 2004), South African actress and influencer
