= Hope Mbhele =

South African actress (born 1996)

- Born: Hope Mbhele; 5 April 1996 (age 30); Mthwalume, KwaZulu-Natal, South Africa
- Occupations: Actress; television presenter; singer
- Years active: 2016–present
- Notable work: Umkhokha; Shaka iLembe; The Four of Us

Hope Mbhele (born 5 April 1996) is a South African actress, television presenter and singer. She is best known playing the starring roles in Umkhokha (2023–2024) as Mabusi, Shaka iLembe (2023–2024) as Baleka and The Four of Us (2026–present) as Ndumi Nhlapho.

== Career ==
Mbhele made her acting debut in the television series Uzalo in 2016. She rose to prominence after she played the lead role of Mabusi in Umkhokha:The Curse season 1 in 2021. She was a presenter in Ladysmith Black Mambazo 60th Anniversary Concert and played the role of Amahle in No Love Lost. She hosted the blue carpet for DStv Mzansi Viewers' Choice Awards alongside Pamela Manga and Smash Afrika, and being the only woman to be nominated for Favourite Rising Star Award. In 2023, Umkhokha came back in screens as she still portraying as Mabusi in season 1–2. In June, she played the starring role of Baleka in cultural and historical television series Shaka iLembe. Later that year, she was announced that she will be the red carpet host for the South African Music Awards.

In 2024, Mbhele appeared in a dating show Dating#NoFilter South Africa as a celebrity guest. In 2025, she was a host in a Supersport talent show MVP Talent Search. She hosted the 2025 Simon Mabhunu Sabela KZN Film and TV Awards in July. In 2026, she played the supporting role of Kimberly Jansen in Fatal Seduction. She is currently playing the main role e.tv telenovela The Four of Us as Ndumi Nhlapho. On 21 August 2026, she was a presenter at the National Arts and Culture Awards 2026 with Vafa Naraghi.

== Filmography ==
=== Film ===
Year	Title	Role	Notes
2022	No Love Lost	Amahle	Starring role

=== Television ===
Year	Title	Role	Notes
2016	Uzalo	Extra	Recurring role
2021	Umkhokha:The Curse	Mabusi	Lead role
2022	DStv Mzansi Viewers' Choice Awards	Herself	Blue Carpet Host
2023	Umkhokha	Mabusi	Lead role
2023	Shaka iLembe	Baleka	Starring role
2023	South African Music Awards	Herself	Red Carpet Host
2024	Dating#NoFilter South Africa	Herself	Guest
2025	MVP Talent Search	Herself	Host
2026–present	Fatal Seduction	Kimberly Jansen	Supporting role
2026–present	The Four of Us	Ndumi Nhlapho	Main role

== Awards and nominations ==
Year	Association	Category	Nominated works	Result	Ref.
2022	DStv Mzansi Viewers' Choice Awards	Favourite Rising Star Award	Herself	Nominated	
