= Moshoeshoe Chabeli =

South African actor

- Died: October 30, 2013
- Occupation: Actor
- Notable work: The Forgotten Kingdom

Moshoeshoe Chabeli (died October 30, 2013) was a South African actor.

He portrayed Harold in the 2003 film, Stander with Thomas Jane. He also portrayed the Priest in the 2013 film, The Forgotten Kingdom. On television he appeared in the sitcom, Mponeng, which is a South African adaptation of the British sitcom, Keeping Up Appearances.

He was a royal descent of Moshoeshoe I. He died on October 30, 2013, following a battle of cancer.

== Select filmography ==
- Stander (2003)
- Beat the Drum (2003)
- Critical Assignment (2004)
- The Forgotten Kingdom (2013)
