= Keabetswe Motsilanyane =

South African actress

- Born: Keabetswe Motsilanyane; 8 April 1979 (age 47); Moruleng, South Africa
- Other names: KB Motsilanyane; KB Mamosadi; Mamosadi KB
- Occupations: Performing artist; singer; actress; songwriter; dancer; businesswoman
- Years active: 1995–present
- Spouse: Terry Pinana
- Musical career
- Genres: Pop; soul; rhythm and blues
- Instrument: Vocals
- Years active: 2002–present

Keabetswe "KB" Motsilanyane (born 8 April 1979), sometimes known as KB Mamosadi, is a South African actress, singer, performing artist, and businesswoman. She is a R'n'B singer as well as a songwriter. As an actress, she is best known for her roles in the serials Backstage, Rhythm City and 7de Laan.

== Personal life ==
Motsilanyane was born on 8 April 1979 in Moruleng, South Africa. She was once married to Terry Pinana; they separated in 2007. She is a mother of one son.

== Career ==
Motsilanyane has achieved prominence as a recording artist in South Africa with her six albums. She has shared arenas with both local and international artists, including: Eve, Sibongile Khumalo, Busta Rhymes, Beyonce, Prime Circle, Ashanti, Dwele and Brandy. She began her musical career when she joined the South African group, Crowded Crew, who became prominent in the late 1990s. In 2001, Motsilanyane joined the e-TV soapie Backstage as herself; this coincided with the release of her debut album, Beautiful Vibrations (2002), which featured the hit song "O A lla", earning her the name Mamosadi.

She started her acting career in 1999 with theater plays. She is best known for the show Backstage where she played the role of KayBee. After her departure from the show, she played the role of Lucilla Vilakazi in the popular television series Rhythm City. She became a regular cast member in the series until her departure in 2015. In 2015 she also worked as a model at Soweto Fashion Week runway. In 2017, she joined the popular South African Afrikaans soapie 7de Laan and played the role of a feisty lawyer, Lesedi. She also starred in the second season of the series Thola as Dibuseng Makwarela. She played a leading role in the series Mtunzini.com as Phaphama Molefe. Motsilanyane has earned two nominations for the Golden Horn Award for Best Actress in a TV Soap in 2008 and 2011.

== Awards ==
She has received several musical awards:

- 2003 Metro FM Award Best RnB
- 2003 Metro FM Awards Best Newcomer
- 2003 SAMA Best RNB
- 2004 Metro FM Award Best Female Artist
- 2004 Metro FM Award Best RnB
- 2005 & 2006 Kid's Choice Awards Favourite Female Artist
- 2005 Metro FM Award Best Female Artist
- 2008 SAMA Best Urban Pop 2008 Metro FM Award Best Styled Artist

== Filmography ==
Year	Film	Role	Genre	Ref
2001	Ali	Pointer Sister	Film	
2005	Backstage	KayBee	TV series	
2007	Rhythm City	Lucilla Vilakazi	TV series	
2012	Thola	Dibuseng Makwarela	TV series	
2013	Mtunzini.com	Phaphama Molefe	TV series	
2020	7de Laan	Lesedi Moloi	TV series	
2019	Dream: The Lebo Mathosa Story	Lebo Mathosa	TV series	
2021	Liarholics Anonymous	Trisha Pule	Film	
2023	House of Zwide	Nandipha	TV drama series	
2025	Genesis	Wendy Sedibeng	TV series	
