= Mapula Mafole =

South African actress

- Born: Mapula Mafole; 18 July 1990 (age 36); Klerksdorp, North West, South Africa
- Other name: Mpule
- Education: AFDA
- Occupation: Actress
- Years active: 2012–present
- Known for: Playing Mapula on Rhythm City

Mapula Mafole (born 18 July 1990) is a South African actress best known for playing the role of Mapula on the e.tv soapie Rhythm City.

== Early life ==
Mafole was born in Diepkloof, Soweto, Gauteng and raised in Klerksdorp, North West. Her parents Moses and Monica Mafole later moved her and her siblings to Tshwane, Pretoria when she was 10, before they relocated to the United Kingdom. In 2013, she graduated and now holds AFDA degree.

== Career ==
In 2012, Mafole made her television debut with a cameo role on SABC1 drama series Intersexions playing the role of Beauty. She later joined the cast of the e.tv soap opera Rhythm City, playing the character Mapula. In interviews she has spoken about how the role resonated with her personal history and mental-health struggles, and that playing Mapula helped her confront and channel her experiences.

Due to her youthful appearance, she has noted in media that she was often cast as teenagers, even after becoming an adult. In 2020, she told a newspaper that as she approached her 30s she hoped to take on more mature roles, potentially even "villainous" characters, rather than always be typecast as the victim or "schoolgirl" type.

After leaving Rhythm City, Mafole told an interviewer she was ready to "stretch herself" and take on more varied roles. In 2022 she joined the cast of Unmarried as Rea, marking one of her first major roles.

In the following years she starred in various productions, including the Ke Bona Spoko (2022), Expiry Date, the 1Magic miniseries Pila Pila (2023), and My Girlfriend’s Father (2023).

In 2024 she was announced to star in 016 FM, a drama series for Showmax.

== Personal life ==
Mafole has spoken candidly about her personal battles with depression and anxiety, describing how growing up without her parents around and moving as a child contributed to difficult emotional times. She has credited acting, especially emotionally demanding roles, as a form of therapy and self-help.

She has also publicly expressed a desire to enter the music industry. In a 2018 interview she said she was learning to DJ, enjoyed music production, and considered music akin to acting, a way of storytelling and connecting with people.

== Awards and nominations ==
List of Accolades
| Award / Film Festival | Year | Nomination | Project | Recipient | Result | Ref. |
|---|---|---|---|---|---|---|
| South African Film and Television Awards | 2018 | Golden Horn Award for Best Supporting Actress | Rhythm City | Herself | Nominated | |
| South African Film and Television Awards | 2020 | Golden Horn Award for Best Actress | Rhythm City | Herself | Nominated | |
| South African Film and Television Awards | 2021 | Golden Hord Award for Best Supporting Actress | Rhythm City | Herself | Nominated | (Note: Cited to multiple sources:) |

== Filmography ==
Television
| Year | Title | Role | Notes | Ref. |
|---|---|---|---|---|
| 2012 | Intersexions | Beauty | Cameo role | |
| 2015–2022 | Rhythm City | Mapula | Main role | |
