= Sol Phenduka =

South African podcaster and music DJ (born 1987

- Born: Solomzi Thandubuntu Phenduka; February 18, 1987 (age 39); Vosloorus, Gauteng, South Africa
- Genres: Deep house, electro house, Tribal House, Afro Beat, Nu Jazz, Afro dub
- Occupations: radio personality, music DJ, podcaster
- Instrument: music sequencer,
- Years active: 2008 –present

Solomzi Thandubuntu Phenduka (born 18 February 1987) is a South African radio personality, music DJ and podcaster. A reality TV star contested on Big Brother Mzansi season 1, he is professionally known as Sol Phenduka.

== Life and career ==
Phenduka was born in Vosloorus and raised by a single mother. He attended St Francis College in Benoni, matriculating in 2006 and later receiving a Bachelor's degree from the University of Johannesburg. His music interest began at an early age as a rapper. He was also a prolific Reggae vocalist until he fell out with his group Sol and the Mambinos.

== Career ==
=== Radio and broadcasting ===
Phenduka began his broadcasting career as an intern at YFM in 2008, later securing on-air roles and contributing to youth-targeted programming. He subsequently worked on breakfast radio shows, including a period on 5FM where he contributed to the Fresh at 5 / DJ Fresh programming team. Over the years he has presented on several national stations and occupied high-profile morning show slots.

In 2022 Phenduka joined Kaya 959 as co-host of the breakfast show with Dineo Ranaka. In August 2025 Kaya FM announced that Phenduka had been suspended with immediate effect pending the outcome of an internal process; the station said it was committed to due process and would not release further details until the investigation concluded.

=== Reality television ===
Phenduka was a housemate and finalist on Big Brother Mzansi (season 1), which increased his national profile and helped broaden his media opportunities.

=== Podcasting and online media ===
Phenduka has been a regular contributor and co-host on Podcast and Chill with MacG, alongside Macgyver Mukwevho, a leading African podcast and web series; episodes featuring him have attracted large online audiences and contributed to his profile as a media personality. The podcast is broadcast on YouTube.

=== Music career ===
Phenduka is also a recording artist and music producer. Phenduka has released two singles in 2010 and 2011, and an album in 2012. He was also part of the contestants on Big Brother Mzansi in 2014.

He has released at least one self-titled album, Sol Phenduka, (released on major streaming platforms) and several singles and remixes, including the tracks "Uhuru" and later remix projects; his music is available on streaming services such as Apple Music and Spotify.

== Controversy / disciplinary action ==
In August 2025, Kaya 959 announced that Phenduka had been suspended pending an internal investigation; the station confirmed the suspension and said it would follow due process, but did not publish further details while the investigation was underway.

This was not the first suspension in Phenduka’s broadcasting career. In January 2015 he was suspended by the national youth station 5FM (along with a producer/colleague) after making remarks on air about the Van Breda family murders that were judged offensive; management removed the feature segment and imposed a short suspension while they investigated and dealt with the matter.

== Singles ==
=== As lead artist ===
List of singles as lead artist, with selected chart positions and certifications, showing year released and album name
Title	Year	Peak chart positions	Certifications	Album
Title	Year	ZA	Certifications	Album
"Diqabang" (Khathapillar, Sol Phenduka, Smash SA featuring Kamoh Xaba)	2024	2		Non-album single
"—" denotes a recording that did not chart or was not released in that territory.
