= Siphesihle Ndaba =

South African actress and influencer (born 1997)

- Born: Siphesihle Ndaba; August 4, 1997 (age 29); Soweto, South Africa
- Education: Rhodes University
- Occupations: Actress; influencer; entrepreneur; director
- Years active: 2020–present
- Notable work: Gomora

Siphesihle Ndaba (born 4 August 1997) is a South African actress, influencer, entrepreneur and film director. She is best known playing the starring role in most popular Mzansi Magic telenovela Gomora (2020) as Mazet.

== Early life ==
Ndaba was born in Soweto, South Africa. She went to Rhodes University where she obtained a degree of BSc in psychology, Economics and Dramatic Arts. In 2020, she graduated second time where she obtained a Honours degree in Dramatic Arts from the same higher institution.

== Career ==
Ndaba began her career in 2018 where she directed and wrote a film Skinned in Grahamstown Festival and worked as English and Economics teacher tutor while working in theatre. In 2020, she made her first television debut in one of the most popular Mzansi Magic telenovela Gomora as Mazet, playing a gangster and starring role. In late 2020, she won Hot Chick of the Year awards at the Feather Awards. In 2021, she played the lead role of Faye in a short Showmax television series Carrots. She received her first award nomination for her acting career at the 17th edition of South African Film and Television Awards for Best Supporting Actress in a telenovela for her main role as Mazet on Gomora in 2023

In 2024, Ndaba played the main role of Palesa in Killer Front Page and directed a movie namely LIL_LITH.

== Endorsements ==
Ndaba has made her first endorsement when collaborated with Nivea, a beauty brand in 2021. The following year in November 2022, she attended the Oprah Winfrey Leadership Academy for Girls, which changed her life by expanding her career and opportunities. In 2023, she bagged a brand ambassadorship Rich Mnisi x H&M alongside stars Boity, Young Stunna and Zozibini Tunzi, and she collaborated with Puma in December 2024.

== Filmography ==
=== Film ===
Year	Title	Role	Notes
2018	Skinned	Herself	Director and writer
2021	Carrots	Faye	Lead role
2024	LIL_LITH	Herself	Director and producer

=== Television ===
Year	Title	Role	Notes
2020	Gomora	Mazet	Main role
2022	DStv Mzansi Viewers Choice Awards	Herself	Presented Favourite Personality
2024	Killer Front Page	Pelesa	Main role

== Awards and nominations ==
Year	Association	Category	Nominated works	Result	Ref.
2020	Feather Awards	Hot Chick of the Year	Herself	Won	
2023	South African Film and Television Awards	Best Supporting Actress	As Mazet on Gomora	Nominated	
