= Siyasanga Papu =

South African actress (born 1986)

- Born: Siyasanga Catherine Papu; 14 July 1986 (age 39); Pretoria, South Africa
- Education: Hoerskool Elandspoort
- Alma mater: Damelin
- Occupation(s): Actress, entrepreneur, singer, sketch artist
- Years active: 2005–present
- Known for: The Herd & Lokshin Bioskop Movies
- Children: 1

Siyasanga Catherine Papu (born 14 July 1986) is a South African actress, entrepreneur, singer and sketch artist. She is best known for the roles in the television serials such as; Hillside, The Herd and Gomora.

== Personal life ==
Siyasanga Papu was born on 14 July 1986 in Pretoria, Gauteng, South Africa. She completed high school at Hoerskool Elandspoort, located in Danville, west of Pretoria from 2000 to 2004. Then in 2005, she enrolled in filmmaking at Damelin.

== Career ==
Before television, she made extensive appearances in the theatre stage where she toured internationally and locally since 2005. In 2007, she performed in the play Speak Out took place at Sheraton hotel. In 2008, she performed in the theatre play Ag Man Nee Man done on World's Aids Day. Then she joined with the theatre musical play, Jock of the Bushveld in 2010 and played the role of a "mothering hippo".

In 2006, she joined with the SABC2 drama Hillside and played the role "Nurse Dineo". She reprised the role in the second season as well. Then in 2016, she joined with the second season of Mzansi Magic drama Saints and Sinners to play the role "Lena Zondi". In 2015, role as Nomathemba on the supernatural drama series The Herd. In 2018, she made the recurring role of "Fezeka" on the sixth season of the Mzansi Magic soap opera Isibaya. In the same year, she made the lead role as "Nomathemba" on the Mzansi Magic supernatural drama The Herd.

Then in 2019, she appeared in the Mzansi Magic telenovela with a minor role as "social worker". Later in 2020, she joined with lead cast of another Mzansi Magic telenovela Gomora to play the role "Pretty" for two seasons. Apart from them, she made sporadic appearances in the soapi opera Generations: The Legacy and Rhythm City. As a vocalist, she has a 6-piece band and has two Naledi nominations for roles played in musical theatre shows.

== Filmography ==
Year	Film	Role	Genre	Ref.
2006	Hillside	Nurse Dineo	TV series	
2007	Usindiso	Guest role	TV series	
	Generations	Guest role	TV series	
	Rhythm City	Portia	TV series	
2016	Saints and Sinners	Lena Zondi	TV series	
2018	Isibaya	Fezeka	TV series	
2018	The Herd	Nomathemba	TV series	
2019	Isithembiso	Social Worker	TV series	
2020- 2023	Gomora	Pretty	TV series	
