= Tebogo Khalo =

- Born: 31 May 1985 (age 40); Alexandra, South Africa
- Occupation: Actress
- Known for: Rhythm City

Tebogo Khalo (born 31 May 1985) is a South African actress best known for her role as Puleng Mafoleng, in the etv soap opera,

Rhythm City (2007–2021), which earned her a Golden Horn Award. She has also appeared in Mzali Wami and The River.

== Early life and Education ==
Khalo was born in Alexandra, Gauteng. Her role on Rhythm City was her screen acting debut and won her the Golden Horn award for Best Supporting Actress in a Soap Opera at the 2011 South African Film and Television Awards (SAFTAs).

She has played lead roles in Mzali Wami as Captain Gumbi. Khalo joined the cast of the South African drama series The River in its sixth season, where she played the character of Makhosi. The show was later cancelled.

== Career ==
Khalo started her career in acting by working in education theatre to promote reading in schools. She is also in radio having co-hosted a current affairs show that was aimed at the youth.

== Personal life ==
Khalo married her long-term partner in 2011, after dating since 2006. The couple has stated that they do not intend to have children.

== Awards ==
Khalo received Best Supporting Actress in a Soap Opera at the 2011 South African Film and Television Awards (SAFTAs).
