= Umkhokha =

- Based on: An original concept by Mandla kaNozulu
- Written by: Chris Q. Radebe; Sasa Nqabeni; Sayitsheni Mdakhi; Zoleka Monare; Awelani Makhuvha
- Directed by: Menga Nhlabathi
- Starring: Deli Malinga; Sthandiwe Kgoroge; Nay Maps; Linda Sokhulu; Hope Mbhele; Sibonile Ngubane; Kwezi Ndlovu
- Theme music composer: Zithulele Kwela; Lamontville Cultural Ensemble
- Opening theme: Mkhululi Wezoni

Production
- Executive producers: Mandla KaNozulu; Nathi Ngwane
- Producer: Nkonzo Mdluli
- Production company: Rhythm World Productions

Original release
- Network: Mzansi Magic
- Release: 3 October 2021

Umkhokha is a South African television drama series created by Duma Ndlovu, based on an original concept by Mandla kaNozulu. It is an M-Net original series produced by Rhythm World Productions for subscription television channel Mzansi Magic, and stars Deli Malinga, Sthandiwe Kgoroge, Nay Maps, Linda Sokhulu, Hope Mbhele, Sibonile Ngubane and Kwezi Ndlovu.

== Synopsis ==
Ithempeli Lenkosi, the largest church in KwaZulu-Natal, is at the center of the series. The church's significant size and influence lead many to view it as a business. The series begins with the announcement of a lucrative contract between the church and a beverage company. The contract involves the company bottling and selling holy water, which the church leader, Kwazi Mthembu, prays over. The church shares in the profits generated by the company. The first scene of the series depicts the murder of Kwazi Mthembu, the leader of Ithempeli Lenkosi. This event sets off a power struggle for control of the church between the Mthembu and Gumede families, as various factions vie for dominance.

== Cast ==
=== Lead cast ===
- Deli Malinga as MaMzobe
- Sthandiwe Kgoroge as MaNdzimande
- Nay Maps as Sphamandla Mthembu
- Hope Mbhele as Mabusi
- Linda Sokhulu as Zodwa
- Sibonile Ngubane as Difa
- Kwezi Ndlovu and Kwanele Mthethwa as Nobuntu

=== Main role ===
- Nelisiwe Sibiya as Nompendulo
- Mbuso Khoza as Maphalala
- Msizi Njapha as Khulekani
- Sithembiso Khumalo as Zisebenzele
- Nokwanda Khuzwayo as Xolile
- Mondli Makhoba as Reggie
- Angel Zuma as Nomkhosi
- Nhlanhla Mofokeng as Ntuthuko
- Sibusiso Gcaba as Kwazi Mthembu

=== Recurring role ===
- Zandile Zungu as Aunt Phelelephi
- Sandile Mthembu as Stebhisi
- Nkanyiso Kunene as Ntshumenthu

== Production ==
Principal filming took place in Sydney Rd, Congela, Durban.

=== Music ===
The original soundtrack and opening music was composed by Zithulele Kwela and the Lamontville Cultural Ensemble for RhythmWorld Music. The soundtrack was officially released.

== Broadcast ==
The series premiered on 3 October 2021, airing weekly episodes on Mzansi Magic. It was rerun on lower-tiered channel Mzansi Wethu on 15 October 2022. Later on, the series was added to streaming service Showmax.

== Reception ==
According to the Broadcast Research Council's TAMS reviews, the series performed well in October 2021, drawing a viewership of 789,218 with an audience rating of 2.04, achieving a 14.8% share among viewers.

== Spin-off series ==
In February 2023, Multichoice and M-Net announced a spin-off prequel series, titled Umkhokha: The Curse. Rather than continuing from the events of the original series which ended in a cliffhanger, the story takes viewers back to the beginning of the Ithempeli Lenkosi megachurch. Deli Malinga, Sibonile Ngubane, Nay Maps, and Hope Mbhele reprised their roles, while Gcinile Nkosi and Daniel Hadebe replaced Sthandiwe Kgoroge and Mondli Makhoba respectively. The series premiered on 6 March 2023, in the format of a telenovela.
