= Pinetown Boys' High School =

Coordinates: 29°49′35″S 30°52′55″E

Location
- 18 Balfour Road Cowies Hill Park; Pinetown, KwaZulu-Natal; South Africa

Information
- Type: Public
- Motto: Fortiter in Omne (Bravely into all Things)
- Established: 1978
- Locale: Suburban
- Headmaster: Mr R. Sing
- Exam board: KZN
- Grades: 8–12
- Colours: Blue; Red; Yellow
- Mascot: Grizzly Bear
- Website: www.pbhs.co.za

Pinetown Boys' High School (also known as Pinetown Boys', or PBHS) is a public school for boys in Pinetown, KwaZulu-Natal, South Africa.

== History ==
Pinetown High School was founded in 1955 as a co-educational, dual-medium school. It was sited at the present location of Pinetown Girls' High School in Old Main Road (now Josiah Gumede road) with 120 pupils in Standard 6 and 7 and a staff of 14 under the leadership of Mr. H. E. Wiese, the first headmaster.

The badge includes the letters PHS (Pinetown High School), a crown which represents the period when South Africa was part of the British Empire, three pine cones honouring Sir Benjamin Pine, who was instrumental in developing Pinetown when it was still a village, and a book which stands for education.

In 1978, Pinetown High School went from co-ed to two separate schools, Pinetown Boys' High School and Pinetown Girls High School.

The school has gained a first place in the Natal Matriculation Examinations and has had pupils in the top 30 twenty two times in 25 years. A large number of pupils have gained KwaZulu-Natal, and national colours.

== Academics ==
Classes offered to students include Afrikaans, English, Zulu, life orientation, mathematics, mathematical literacy, physical sciences, life sciences, mechanical technology, history, geography, accounting, business studies, design, engineering graphics and design, and information technology.

== School houses ==
Pinetown Boys' High School consists of 4 houses, each learner is placed in a house, either Jason, Hermes, Ajax or Vulcan. The team colours are blue, red, yellow, green, respectively.

== Extramural activities ==
Pinetown Boys’ High School offers a wide range of sporting activities, including athletics, badminton, basketball, chess, cricket, cross country, hockey, rugby union, soccer, swimming, tennis, volleyball, Chess, and water polo.

The school also offers cultural activities, including choir, Pinetown Post, the school's newsletter, debating, public speaking, and first aid.

== Notable alumni ==
- Steve Atherton - former Natal Sharks and the Springboks rugby player.
- Marcello Cuttitta - former Italian rugby union rugby player, and twin brother of Massimo Cuttitta.
- Massimo Cuttitta - former Italian rugby union rugby player.
- Wesley Moodie - former professional tennis player.
- Darren Simpson - radio presenter.
- Loyiso Macdonald - actor.
- Mathew Quinn - Athletics
