= Genesis (South African TV series) =

South African drama television series

- Genre: Music drama
- Created by: Singavision Production
- Written by: Kagiso Mogale; Bongani Masongo; Karabo Mogali; Sinomvuyo Nqwili; Lesedi Phaahla; Lunga John Radebe; Nthabiseng Tau; Puseletso Thibedi
- Directed by: Luthando Mngomezulu; Adze Ugah; Nthabi Mokoena; Menga Nhlabathi
- Starring: Baby Cele; Buyile Mdladla; Nay Maps; Gaosi Raditholo; Kealeboga Masango; Karabelo Ramabodu; Craig Nobela; KB Motsilanyane; Lerato Nxumalo
- Country of origin: South Africa
- No. of seasons: 1
- No. of episodes: 260

Production
- Executive producers: Gersh Kgamedi; Kagiso Mogale
- Producer: Singavision Production
- Camera setup: Multi-camera
- Running time: 22–24 minutes

Original release
- Network: Mzansi Magic
- Release: 21 April 2025 – 17 April 2026

Genesis is a South African television drama series that is premiered on Mzansi Magic on 21 April 2025 and produced by Singavision Productions. It is set in the high stakes world of the gospel music industry and follows the lives of the Thabethe family, founders of the successful record label "Genesis Records".

== Premise ==
Genesis centers on Felicia Thabethe played by Baby Cele, a former gospel queen who built a successful music empire "Genesis Records" with her husband, Gabriel Gigaba played by Biyela Mdladla. The show delves into the high stakes world of gospel music where this seemingly perfect legacy is threatened when shocking secrets and betrayals surface, throwing everything into chaos.

== Cast ==
Actor/Actress	Character	Seasons
Actor/Actress	Character	Season 1
Baby Cele	Felicia Thabethe-Gigaba	Main
Biyela Mdladla	Gabriel Gigaba	Main
Nay Maps Mapholoba	Bonko Thabethe	Main
Gaosi Raditholo	Mmarona Sedibeng	Main
KB Motsilanyane	Wendy Sedibeng	Main
Kealeboga Masango	Nobuhle Thabethe	Main
Karabelo Ramabodu	Mpumi	Main
Craig Nobela	Ishmael Longwe	Main
Sibongile Nojila	Ausi Moliehi	Main
Lerato Nxumalo	Owethu Hlope	Main
Josias Moleele	Bishop Hlope	Main
Louie Vega Ngcayiya	Fistos Shabangu	Main
Kaabo Ya One Mokhine	Noah Thabethe	Recurring
Sibongile Phakathi	Zanele Hlope	Recurring
Makgofe Moagi	Thandi Radebe	Recurring

== Production ==
Genesis is produced by the South African company Singavision Productions for Mzansi Magic, under the executive production of Kagiso Mogale and Gersh Kgamedi. The series was commissioned by M-Net as a high budget telenovela exploring the gospel music industry. It is filmed using a Multi-camera setup and directed by Luthando Mngomezulu, Adze Ugah, Nthabi Mokoena and Menga Nhlabathi. The writing team is led by Kagiso Mogale with writers Bongani Masongo, Karabo Mogali, Sinomvuyo Nqwili, Lesedi Phaahla, Lunga John Radebe, Nthabiseng Tau and Puseletso Thibedi contributing to the scripts. Filming takes place primarily in Johannesburg, South Africa. The production aims to showcase a rarely depicted aspect of local storytelling the business and personal rivalries within the gospel music scene.

== Release ==
The series premiered on Mzansi Magic on 21 April 2025 to 17 April 2026, airing Mondays to Fridays at 19:30.
