= Ayakha Ntunja =

South African actress (born 2004)

- Ntunja in 2023
- Born: Ayakha Ntunjas; 2004 (age 21–22); Gqeberha, Eastern Cape, South Africa
- Education: National School of the Arts
- Occupations: Actress; influencer
- Years active: 2019–present
- Notable work: Youngins; Inimba

Ayakha Ntunja (born 2004) is a South African actress, dancer and influencer. She is best known for her notable roles playing the lead role in a Showmax television series Youngins (2024–2025) as Amo and starring role in Mzansi Magic drama series Inimba (2025–present) as Qhawe Mabandla.

== Career ==
Ntunja began her acting career in 2016 featured in theatre, where she upgraded her acting and writing skills and made her first television debut in 2021 playing the role of Dudu in Showmax film Pearls of Wisdom. She also landed roles in other television series including Ntash, Ubizo Lakhe and Ke Bona Spoko. In 2023, she portrayed as Thembi in season 3 of MTV Shuga: Down South. In 2024, she landed her first lead role as Amo in the Showmax youth drama series Youngins and played the supporting role in a short film Intlawulo as Ovayo with Kealeboga Masango. In early 2025, she played a starring in Mzansi Magic drama series Inimba as Qhawe Mabandla. By September 2025, she played the main role as Vazu in the film Loved Out. Ntunja made her magazine cover in True Love Magazine, a leading magazine in South Africa for April to June 2026.

== Filmography ==
=== Film ===
Year	Title	Role	Notes
2021	Pearls of Wisdom	Dudu	Main role
2021	Ntash	Aviwe	Lead role
2022	Ubizo Lakhe	Gugu Dlamini	Lead role
2022	Ke Bona Spoko	Zinzi	Main role
2022	Minno Wa Lerato	Portia	Lead role
2024	Intlawulo	Owayo	Main role

=== Television ===
Year	Title	Role	Notes
2023	MTV Shuga: Down South	Thembi	Supporting role
2024–2025	Youngins	Amo	Lead role
2026–present	Inimba	Qhawe Mabandla	Main role

== Awards and nominations ==
Year	Association	Category	Nominated works	Result	Ref.
2019	Festival of Excellence in Dramatic Arts	Acting Award	Herself	Won	
2020	Best Performer Full Colours Awards	Best Choreographer of the Year	Herself	Won	
2020	Best Performer Full Colours Awards	Best Dancer of the Year	Herself	Won	
2026	Africa Choice Awards	Most Promising Movie Star of the Year	Herself	Pending	
