= Thembi Seete =

South African actress, musician, dancer and television presenter

- Born: Thembi Seete; 25 March 1977 (age 49); Soweto, South Africa
- Occupations: Actress; Musician; Activist; multimedia personality; model; entrepreneur; digital content creator
- Years active: 1993–present
- Mother: Rebecca Seete
- Relatives: Moagi Seete
- Awards: Multiple
- Musical career
- Genres: Kwaito; adult contemporary; hip hop
- Instruments: Vocals
- Formerly of: Boom Shaka

Thembi Seete (born 25 March 1977) is a South African actress, singer-songwriter, media personality and model. She is best known as a member of former kwaito group Boom Shaka. She played the role of "Gladys" in the Mzansi Magic telenovela Gomora from its debut in 2020 to its finale in 2023.

== Early life ==
Seete was born on 25 March 1977 in Soweto, Gauteng, South Africa. Her father died in 2014. She grew up in Sebokeng in the Vaal with her aunt and uncle. Her mother Rebecca Seete succumbed to a brain tumor in July 2021.

She has a son, born in 2018, with businessman Collen Mashawana.

== Career ==
In 1993, she became one of the members of the kwaito supergroup called Boom Shaka. She continued to perform with the group until the group split in 2000. Then in 2000, she made her debut film role starring in Hijack Stories. Thereafter, she joined the SABC1 drama series Yizo Yizo. Simultaneously, she featured on TV series' soundtrack with the release of "Sure Ntombazana". Seete, also joined the cast of another SABC1 drama series Gaz’lam, where she played the role "Lerato" until 2004. She continued to perform as a singer. Thembi, and released her debut solo album Lollipop in 2001. After the album's success, she released a second album S’matsatsa, which included popular solo tracks such as "Shayi Zandla" and "Mphate Kahle". In 2005, she acted in the direct-to-video film Crossing the Line playing the role of "Pumla". In 2006, she was cast in her first leading role in the SABC1 soccer drama series Zone 14. In the series, she played the role of "Nina Moloi" for four seasons with good reviews.

In 2009, she released "Black Diamond" via her adult contemporary album Music Is My Life.

In 2014, she acted in the Mzansi Magic film The Gift. In the same year, she co-hosted the Mzansi Magic show The Juice alongside Bob Mabena. Seete later joined the cast of the popular E.tv soapie Rhythm City as the role of "Bongi". In 2020, Thembi was cast as another popular television role "Gladys" in Mzansi Magic's telenovela Gomora.

In 2020, she appeared in the Netflix original Kings of Joburg.

In 2021, she was a guest judge in one episode of the seventeenth season of Mzansi Magic singing reality competition, Idols South Africa.

Apart from acting, she also works as a beautician, where she owns the salon "Azuri".

In February 2022, Seete was announced to be a judge on season 18 of Idols South Africa. She returned the following year in 2023.

== Discography ==
- 2001: Lollipop
- 2003: S'matsatsa
- 2009: Music Is My Life

== Filmography ==
Year	Film	Role	Genre	Notes
2000	Hijack Stories	Hip Girl 1	Film	
2000	Yizo Yizo	Zanele	TV series	
2000	Gaz’lam	Lerato	TV series	
2005	Crossing the Line	Pumla	TV series	
2006	Zone 14	Nina Moloi	TV series	
2009	Mtunzini.com	Lily	TV series	
2014	The Gift	Actor	Film	
2014	Zaziwa	Herself	TV series	
2015	Rhythm City	Bongi	TV series	
2015	Tell Me Sweet Something	Lola	Film	
2020 - 2023	Gomora	Gladys Dlamini	TV series	
2020	Family Secrets	Eleanore Grace	TV series	
2020	Kings of Joburg	Keneilwe	TV series	
2022	Idols South Africa	Judge	TV series	
2023-2024	Adulting	Portia	TV series	13 episodes
