= Lerato Nxumalo =

South African actress and influencer (born 1999)

- Born: Lerato Nxumalo; February 9, 1999 (age 27); Durban, KwaZulu-Natal, South Africa
- Education: University of the Witwatersrand
- Occupations: Actress; influencer; content creator; entrepreneur
- Years active: 2017–present
- Notable work: Durban Gen; Scandal!
- Height: 1.68 m (5 ft 6 in)

Lerato Nxumalo (born 9 February 1999) is a South African actress, influencer, content creator and entrepreneur. She is best known for her starring roles in notable shows on Durban Gen (2020–2023) as Dr Ndabezinhle Luthuli, Scandal! (2023–2024) as Phakamile and Genesis (2025–2026) as Owethu Hlophe. She is the founder of blaHoody and By Lovely Suites.

== Early life ==
Nxumalo was born and raised in Durban, KwaZulu-Natal, South Africa to a Zulu and Sotho family. She went to University of the Witwatersrand where she obtained a degree specializing in Film and Television.

== Career ==
Nxumalo began her career in 2017 after appeared in a commercial of Edgar's and Aero in 2019. She made her first debut acting television role in Durban Gen playing the starring role of Dr Ndabezinhle Luthuli from 2020 to 2023. She appeared in 1Magic telenovela Lingashoni as Mpumi Cele. She expanded her acting career in 2023, when she was playing the lead role in e.tv soapie opera Scandal! as Phakamile.

In 2024, Nxumalo focused on his social media content creation career and takes a break in acting. In 2025, she played the starring role in Mzansi Magic music drama Genesis as Owethu Hlope and the role of Barbie in Netflix crime television series Bad Influencer.

== Other ventures ==
In July 2025, Nxumalo launched her own fashion brand "blaHoody", specializing in comfort wear hoodies. The brand drew inspiration from her heritage and primarily an online business. The following year, in July 2026, she founded her own beauty salon By Lovely Suites located in Midrand, as she said it is her first physical shopping centre.

== Personal life ==
Nxumalo got engaged to her mystery Swedish man who has been popping up hidden in her vlogs and social media post. The pair tied the knot in late September 2025 with limited friends and family invited.

== Filmography ==
| Year | Title | Role | Notes |
|---|---|---|---|
| 2020–2023 | Durban Gen | Dr Ndabezinhle Luthuli | Main role |
| 2021–2023 | Lingashoni | Mpumi Cele | Supporting role |
| 2023–2024 | Scandal! | Phakamile | Starring role |
| 2025–2026 | Genesis | Owethu Hlope | Supporting role |
| 2025 | Bad Influencer | Barbie | Starring role |
