= The Forgotten Kingdom =

- Film poster
- Directed by: Andrew Mudge
- Written by: Andrew Mudge
- Produced by: T.R. Boyce Jr. Pieter Lombaard; Cecil Arthur Matlou; Andrew Mudge
- Starring: Jerry Mofokeng
- Cinematography: Carlos Carvalho
- Edited by: Andrew Mudge
- Music by: Robert Miller
- Release date: April 5, 2013 (Ashland)
- Running time: 101 minutes
- Countries: United States; South Africa; Lesotho
- Language: Sesotho

The Forgotten Kingdom is a 2013 American-South African-Lesotho drama film written and directed by Andrew Mudge and featuring Jerry Mofokeng. It received nine nominations, and won three awards at the 10th Africa Movie Academy Awards.

== Cast ==
- Zenzo Ngqobe as Atang Mokoenya
- Nozipho Nkelemba as Dineo
- Jerry Mofokeng as Katleho
- Lebohang Ntsane as Orphan Boy
- Moshoeshoe Chabeli as Priest
- Lillian Dube as Clinic Doctor
- Jerry Phele as Atang's Father
- Reitumetse Qobo as Nkoti

== Reception ==
The film has an 86% rating on Rotten Tomatoes. Leslie Felperin of The Guardian awarded the film three stars out of five. David Clack of Time Out also awarded it three stars out of five. Trevor Johnston of Radio Times gave the film four stars out of five.
