= Rhythm City =

South African musical drama series

- Genre: Soap opera
- Created by: Rolie Nikiwe; Neil McCarthy
- Directed by: Siyabonga Mkhize; Welile Nzuza; Kgomotso Modupe-Choane; Sarah K. Roberts
- Creative directors: Eric Mogale; Rolie Nikiwe (2007–2013)
- Starring: Mduduzi Mabaso; Mpho Molepo; Tebogo Khalo
- Theme music composer: Alan Lazar; Simon Sibanda; Samthing Soweto
- Country of origin: South Africa
- Original language: English
- No. of seasons: 13
- No. of episodes: 3,660

Production
- Executive producer: Harriet Gavshon
- Producer: Yula Quinn
- Camera setup: Multi-Camera
- Running time: 22-26 minutes
- Production company: Quizzical Pictures

Original release
- Network: e.tv
- Release: 9 July 2007 – 16 July 2021

Related
- Scandal!

Rhythm City is a South African television musical drama series produced by Quizzical Pictures. It is an e.tv original production that aired on the country's free-to-air television channel e.tv from 2007 to 2021. The story revolves around the trials and tribulations of people trying to break into the music industry. The series also aired on e.tv Ghana.

== Main cast ==
| Actor | Role | Seasons |
|---|---|---|
| Mduduzi Mabaso | Suffocate Ndlovu | 1 - 13 |
| Amo Chidi | Reneilwe Khuse | |
| Mpho Molepo | Fats | 1 - 13 |
| Setlhabi Taunyane | Bra Kop Khuse | |
| Tebogo Khalo | Puleng Ndlovu | |
| Itumeleng Bokaba | Mampho | |
| Jamie Bartlett | David Genaro | 1 - 13 |
| Pam Andrews | Gail October | 1-9, 11-13 |
| Mncedisi Shabangu | Khululekani | |
| Pallance Dladla | Sibusiso Vilakazi | |

== Former cast ==
| Actor | Role | Season |
|---|---|---|
| Zamani Mbatha | Pule Ndlovu | 13 |
| Kealeboga Masango | Zinhle | |
| Jesse Suntele | Mzi Ndlovu | |
| Mapula Mafole | Mmapula | |
| Ishmauel Songo | Sabelo | |
| Duma Ntando | Zinzi | |
| Nolo Phiri | Niki | |
| Dumisani Masilela | Sifiso | |
| Connie Chiume | Mamokete Khuse | 1 |
| Peter Se-Puma | Miles Vilakazi | 1 |
| Lungile Radu | S'bu Vilakazi | 1 |
| Lucia Mthiyane | Rachel Phakathi | 1 |
| Mmabatho Montsho | Thembi Phakathi | 1 |
| KB | Lucilla Vilakazi | 1 |
| Nokuthula Ledwaba | Tshidi Khuse | 1 |
| Zenzo Ngqobe | Stone Khuse | 1 |
| Robert Hobbs | Bernard Markgraaf | 1 |
| Kelly Khumalo | Sunay | 1 |
| Deli Malinga | Ntobizodwa | 1 |
| Siphiwe Msimango | Mandla | 1 |
| Wandile Molebatsi | Samuel | 1 |
| Oros Mampofu | Banele | |
| Alonso Grandio | Mark | |

== Production ==
=== Filming ===
e.tv announced the series in 2007, as a replacement to the cancelled youth-orientated soapie Backstage. While the series itself was hinted as being a youth-orientated series as well, producers of the series revealed that the focus would be on the cutthroat music industry. The series was filmed in Stage 6 of Sasani Studios's Highland North complex in Johannesburg, with footage from surrounding areas used.

=== Casting ===
Auditions for the series were held at Windybrow Theatre on 12 May 2007. Throughout its run, the series has been a victim of audition scams, which e.tv had responded to.

=== Impact on production ===
On 2 September 2014, a fire broke out at Sasani Studios. The fire partially shut down production for Rhythm City, alongside e.tv's other soapie Scandal! and M-Net's Big Brother Africa Hotshots. Unaffected by physical damage, production for the series resumed the next day.

In August 2017, production was paused for two days, due to the death of Dumi Masilela, who was killed in a hijacking attempt. A commemorative special on-screen memorial service episode was filmed and aired on October 18, following extensive consultation with Dumi's family.

In March 2020, Rhythm City along with other productions, went on production break due to the COVID-19 pandemic, adhering to the president's call for a national lockdown. Production was paused again in June 2020 due to positive cases of COVID-19 recorded from staff, which e.tv confirmed in a press release. The set went under a thorough cleaning and production resumed later. During the entire period, new episodes which were pre-filmed continued to air on e.tv uninterrupted.

=== Controversy ===
In March 2012, e.tv pulled entries for its series, including Rhythm City, from the 6th South African Film and Television Awards. While the channel didn't give much reason, the awards ceremony revealed that e.tv was dissatisfied over the manner in which the awards were conducted. According to the channel, the action was necessary in order to achieve greater organisational cohesion.

In October 2013, e.tv pulled entries from the Royalty Soapie Awards for both Rhythm City and Scandal!, which took place on 2 November. According to the then group of head channels Monde Twala, the channel did not have sufficient information about the awards, its judging process and criteria, and overall objective.

In March 2016, the Broadcasting Complaints Commission of South Africa reprimanded e.tv and Rhythm City for showing a graphic episode on 20 October 2015, involving the strangulation of a female character. The channel argued that the series is meant for a mature audience, and that the scene only lasted a few minutes. The BCCSA ruled that e.tv had contravened the broadcasting code of conduct by showing content that was harmful to children in a timeslot where a large number of children would be part of the audience. The channel was not fined, and was ordered to display a message on how they violated the code.

=== Music ===
The original soundtrack for the series, including title sequence, was produced by Alan Lazar, under his Lalela Music Library, and Simon Sibanda, with several cast members and artists such as Bongani and Gemini Major. A selection of soundtracks was released through music streaming services Apple Music and Spotify, in 2015. A second title sequence was introduced on 23 October 2014, coinciding with the channel broadcasting in HD. The title sequence was created by Punch Club Studios. Music for the title sequence was done by Alan Lazar and Simon Sibanda, with vocals from Samthing Soweto. The sequence was filmed with aerial shots over Soweto, Alexandra and the Johannesburg CBD, and on the street level in and around Gandhi square. The series also accepted music submissions from upcoming and emerging artists.

=== Cancellation ===
On Friday, 21 November 2020, e.tv announced that the series would be cancelled. While no concrete reason was given for its cancellation, e.tv only stated that it was part of a "business strategy" by the channel. The final episode aired on 16 July 2021. Rhythm City was replaced with the telenovela House of Zwide.

== Broadcast ==
The series premiered on e.tv on 9 July 2007. Premiere episodes were also aired on the now-defunct eKasi+. The series was also briefly uploaded to YouTube, e.tv's online catch-up service eOn Demand, and PCCW's streaming platform Viu, before being removed and added to e.tv's streaming service eVOD.

=== International broadcast ===
Across the African continent, the series was broadcast through the channel's eAfrica feed, as well as affiliate channels e.tv Ghana and e.tv Botswana (now YBotswana). The series was also broadcast in Namibia on NBC.

== Reception ==
=== Awards and nominations ===
| Year | Award | Category | Nominee(s) | Result | Ref. |
|---|---|---|---|---|---|
| 2009 | 3rd South African Film and Television Awards | Best Supporting Actor in a TV Soap | Mduduzi Mabaso | Won | |
| 2009 | 3rd South African Film and Television Awards | Best Supporting Actress in a TV Soap | Nokuthula Ledwaba | Nominated | |
| 2009 | 3rd South African Film and Television Awards | Best Actor in a TV Soap | Jamie Bartlett | Won | |
| 2009 | 3rd South African Film and Television Awards | Best Actor in a TV Soap | Zenzo Ngqobe | Nominated | |
| 2009 | 3rd South African Film and Television Awards | Best Directed Soap | Rhythm City | Nominated | |
| 2009 | 3rd South African Film and Television Awards | Best Ensemble Cast | Rhythm City | Nominated | |
| 2009 | 3rd South African Film and Television Awards | Best Dressed by Public Vote | Keabetswe Motsilanyane | Nominated | |
| 2009 | 3rd South African Film and Television Awards | Beat Comic by Public Vote | Mpho Molepo | Nominated | |
| 2009 | 3rd South African Film and Television Awards | Best Villain/villainess | Jamie Bartlett | Nominated | |
| 2009 | 3rd South African Film and Television Awards | Bsst Soapie by Public Vote | Rhythm City | Nominated | |
| 2010 | 4th South African Film and Television Awards | Best Supporting Actor | Zenzo Ngqobe | Nominated | |
| 2010 | 4th South African Film and Television Awards | Best Supporting Actress | Connie Chiume | Nominated | |
| 2011 | 5th South African Film and Television Awards | Best Director in a TV Soap | Rhythm City | Nominated | |
| 2011 | 5th South African Film and Television Awards | Best Writer/Writing Team | Rhythm City | Nominated | |
| 2011 | 5th South African Film and Television Awards | Best Ensemble in a TV Soap | Rhythm City | Won | |
| 2012 | 6th South African Film and Television Awards | Best Director on a TV Soap | Herbert Hadebe, Eric Mogale, Kekeletso Mphuthi, Sacha Clelland-Strokes | Nominated | |
| 2012 | 6th South African Film and Television Awards | Best Actor in a TV Soap | Mduduzi Mabaso | Nominated | |
| 2012 | 6th South African Film and Television Awards | Best Ensemble on a TV Soap | Rhythm City | Nominated | |
| 2012 | 6th South African Film and Television Awards | Best Writing Team on a TV Soap | Charlie Sapadin and Team | Won | |
| 2012 | 6th South African Film and Television Awards | Best Technical Team on a TV Soap | Rhythm City | Nominated | |
| 2012 | 6th South African Film and Television Awards | Best Art Direction on a TV Soap | Kagiso Malefane | Nominated | |
| 2012 | 6th South African Film and Television Awards | Best Post Production Team on a TV Soap | Rhythm City | Nominated | |
| 2012 | 6th South African Film and Television Awards | Best TV Soap by Public Vote | Rhythm City | Nominated | |
| 2013 | 7th South African Film and Television Awards | Best Ensemble Cast in a TV Soap | Rhythm City | Won | |
| 2013 | 7th South African Film and Television Awards | Best Writing Team of a TV Soap | Rhythm City | Nominated | |
| 2013 | 7th South African Film and Television Awards | Best TV Soap by Public Vote | Rhythm City | Nominated | |
| 2014 | 8th South African Film and Television Awards | Best TV Soap | Rhythm City | Nominated | |
| 2014 | 8th South African Film and Television Awards | Best Writing Team of a TV Soap | Charlie Sapadin | Nominated | |
| 2015 | 9th South African Film and Television Awards | Best TV Soap | Rhythm City | Nominated | |
| 2015 | 9th South African Film and Television Awards | Best Actor in a Lead Role | Jamie Bartlett | Won | |
| 2015 | 9th South African Film and Television Awards | Best Achievement in Scriptwriting | Charlie Sapadin, Anthony Akerman, Darryl Bristow-Bovey | Nominated | |
| 2015 | 9th South African Film and Television Awards | Best Achievement in Sound | Willie Niewoudt | Nominated | |
| 2016 | 10th South African Film and Television Awards | Best TV Soap | Rhythm City | Won | |
| 2016 | 10th South African Film and Television Awards | Best Achievement in Directing - TV Soap | Eric Mogale, Heather Cooke and Siyabonga Mkhize | Won | |
| 2016 | 10th South African Film and Television Awards | Most Popular TV Soap by Public Vote | Rhythm City | Nominated | |
| 2016 | 10th South African Film and Television Awards | Best Achievement in Scriptwriting | Neil McCarthy, Thishiwe Ziqubu, Byron Abrahams, Craig Freimond | Nominated | |
| 2016 | 10th South African Film and Television Awards | Best Achievement in Cinematography | Hein van Zyl | Nominated | |
| 2016 | 10th South African Film and Television Awards | Best Achievement in Editing | Ravi Desai | | |
| 2016 | 10th South African Film and Television Awards | Best Achievement in Editing | Ravi Desai | Nominated | |
| 2017 | 11th South African Film and Television Awards | Most Popular TV Soap | Rhythm City | Nominated | |
| 2018 | 12th South African Film and Television Awards | Best Supporting Actress in a TV Soap/Telenovela | Mapula Mafole | Nominated | |
| 2018 | 12th South African Film and Television Awards | Most Popular TV Soap or Telenovela | Rhythm City | Nominated | |
| 2019 | 13th South African Film and Television Awards | Best TV Soap | Rhythm City | Nominated | |
| 2019 | 13th South African Film and Television Awards | Best Actor in a TV Soap | Jamie Bartlett | Won | |
| 2019 | 13th South African Film and Television Awards | Best Achievement in Art Direction/ Production Design - TV Soap/Telenovela | Kagiso Malefane | Nominated | |
| 2019 | 13th South African Film and Television Awards | Best Achievement in Make-up and Hair - TV Soap | Lucy Ngwira | Nominated | |
| 2020 | 14th South African Film and Television Awards | Best TV Soap | Rhythm City | Won | |
| 2020 | 14th South African Film and Television Awards | Best Actress in a TV Soap | Mapula Mafole | Nominated | |
| 2020 | 14th South African Film and Television Awards | Best Actor in a TV Soap | Jamie Bartlett | Nominated | |
| 2020 | 14th South African Film and Television Awards | Best Supporting Actress in a TV Soap | Petronella Tshuma | Nominated | |
| 2020 | 14th South African Film and Television Awards | Best Supporting actor in a TV Soap | Mncedisi Shabangu | Won | |
| 2020 | 14th South African Film and Television Awards | Best Achievement in Directing in a TV Soap | Eric Mogale | Won | |
| 2020 | 14th South African Film and Television Awards | Most Popular TV Soap/Telenovela by public vote | Rhythm City | Nominated | |
| 2021 | 15th South African Film and Television Awards | Best TV Soap | Rhythm City | Won | |
| 2021 | 15th South African Film and Television Awards | Best Actress in a TV Soap | Petronella Tshuma | Won | |
| 2021 | 15th South African Film and Television Awards | Best Supporting Actress in a TV Soap | Mapula Mafole | Nominated | |
| 2021 | 15th South African Film and Television Awards | Best Achievement in Directing in a TV Soap | Eric Mogale | Nominated | |
| 2021 | 15th South African Film and Television Awards | Best Achievement in Scriptwriting in a TV Soap | Zelipa Zulu | Nominated | |
| 2021 | 15th South African Film and Television Awards | Most Popular TV Soap/Telenovela | Rhythm City | Nominated | |

.
