= Kealeboga Masango =

South African actress (born 2003)

- Born: Kealeboga Masango; October 21, 2003 (age 23); Umlazi, KwaZulu-Natal, South Africa
- Education: University of South Africa
- Occupations: Actress; influencer; singer-songwriter
- Years active: 2019–present
- Notable work: Rhythm City; Youngins; Genesis
- Musical career
- Genres: R&B; neo soul
- Instruments: Vocals
- Label: 6L Records

Kealeboga Masango (born 21 October 2003) is a South African actress, singer-songwriter and social media influencer. She is best known for notable roles playing the lead role in Youngins (2024–2025) as Buhle Kunene, Genesis (2025–2026) as Nobuhle Thabethe and The Four of Us (2026–present) as Balungile Dlomo.

== Career ==
=== Acting ===
Masango made her professional acting debut at the age of 16 where she played supporting role of Zinhle Ngobese on the e.tv soap opera Rhythm City. She joined show in 2019 and continued in that role until the series ended in 2021. This was her first major television role and gained her widespread recognition. In August 2022, she played the starring role of Ntsiki in Ayeye: Stripped season 2, and played the recurring role of Mimi in The River season 6 in late 2023. In 2024, she played the lead role of Buhle Kunene in a popular Showmax telenovela Youngins season 1 to 3, which ended in late 2025 and starred in a film Campus Kings as Bonolo. She starred as Noks BET Africa boxing/sports drama Pound 4 Pound.

In 2025, Masango landed a starring role in the Mzansi Magic gospel telenovela Genesis as Nobuhle Thabethe. In November 2025, she was announced as a brand ambassador and the face of Love and Darkly for 2026 with Sphokuhle N. In March 2026, she was announced that she will be playing an international role in a supernatural thriller Remember Me. In April 2026, she was featured on the Glamour Magazine cover with Wendy Gumede and Sphokuhle N for GLAMOUR's African Month. In June 2026, she begged her second e.tv credit where she play the main role of Balungile Dlomo in the The Four of Us telenovela.

=== Music ===
In March 2026, Masango began her musical career when she announced a debut project A Love That Made Me Hate U studio extended play (EP) and released debut single "Never Show Me Off" on 13 March.

== Discography ==
Kealeboga discography
- EPs: 1
- Singles: 1

=== Extended plays ===
Title	Details
A Love That Made Me Hate U	Released: 20 March 2026; Label: 6L Records; Format: Digital download, streaming

=== Singles ===
==== As lead artist ====
Title	Year	Album
"Never Show Me Off"	2026	A Love That Made Me Hate U
"—" denotes a recording that did not chart in that territory.

== Filmography ==
=== Film ===
Key
†	Denotes productions that have not yet been released

Year	Title	Role	Notes
2023	Indoda Must	Musa Maseko	Lead role
2024	Campus Kings	Bonolo	Main role
2026	Buzzkill	Chloe	Main role
2027	Remember Me †	Beth Palome	Pre-production

=== Television ===
Year	Title	Role	Notes
2019–2021	Rhythm City	Zinhle Ngobese	Supporting role
2022	Ayeye: Stripped	Ntsiki	Starring role
2023	The River	Mimi	Recurring role
2023	Stout School	Mo	Main role
2024–2025	Youngins	Buhle Kunene	Lead role
2024	Pound 4 Pound	Noks	Main role
2025–2026	Genesis	Nobuhle Thabethe	Main role
2026–present	The Four of Us	Balungile Dlomo	Lead role
