= Loyiso Macdonald =

South African actor

- Born: Loyiso Macdonald; 7 September 1986 (age 39); Eastern Cape, South Africa
- Education: Pinetown Boys' High School
- Occupation: Actor
- Years active: 2008–present

Loyiso Macdonald (born 7 September 1986) is a South African actor. He is best known for his roles in the popular series The Queen, 3 Way Junction and Happy Family.

== Personal life ==
Macdonald was born on 7 September 1986 in the Eastern Cape, South Africa. He studied at Pinetown Boys' High School.

He married his partner, producer, actress and musician, Mathunzi Macdonald after a year of dating. He met Mathunzi during a performance of the stage play Othello produced by Think Theatre in Johannesburg in 2010. They were married customarily the following year, and in a civil union on 18 September 2012. Their wedding celebration was on the 30 September 2012 at Mathunzi's home in Mpumalanga in a traditional ceremony.

== Career ==
Before entering acting, Macdonald worked for a bank and a telecommunications call centre. However, without any satisfaction in the job, he quit in 2007. Then he was invited to perform in many stage plays. Later he joined the Mzansi Magic show The Queen which became popular and made his mark in South African television.

At the Durban film school, he studied speech and drama. Then he worked with the Durban Theatre for four years. He moved to Johannesburg in 2011. At the iZulu Theatre in Sibaya Casino, he made several performances. He appeared in the plays Kiss of the Spider Woman, Othello, Escape from Nombiland, and Man Up a Tree. He acted in the soap opera Isidingo in April 2012 in the supportive role of Ntando Sibeko. He has also acted in the serials Intersexions, Zabalaza and Rockville.

== Filmography ==
Year	Film	Role	Genre	Ref.
2015	Isidingo	Ntando Sibeko	TV series	
2017	Happy Family	Theo Tshabalala	TV series	
2018	3 Way Junction	Bartender	Film	
2016–2023	The Queen	Kagiso Khoza	TV series	
2019	Chin Up!	Loyiso	TV series	
2023	Love, Sex and 30 Candles	Winston	Film	
2024	Youngins	Mr Mthembu	TV series	
2025	Inimba	Lazarus	TV series	
