= Katlego Danke =

South African actress

- Born: Katlego Danke; 7 November 1978 (age 47); North West, South Africa
- Education: Sacred Heart College, Johannesburg (BA); University of Cape Town
- Occupations: Actress; TV Presenter; radio DJ; entrepreneur
- Years active: 2002–present
- Known for: Playing Dineo Mashaba on Generations
- Notable work: Generations; Isidingo; Gomora

Katlego Danke (born 7 November 1978) is a South African actress, radio DJ and TV presenter. She is of Tswana ethnicity. Danke is known for her extensive role playing on South African soap operas, Backstage, Generations, Gomora and Isidingo.

== Early life ==
Danke was born on 7 November 1978 in the North West, having stayed her childhood in places like Mahikeng, Ga-Rankuwa, Mabopane, and Potchefstroom.

== Career ==
Katlego was performing in theatre before getting into television. She obtained her BA in Theatre and Performance at University of Cape Town in 2001 and is renowned for stage performances in theatre productions such as Beyond the Veil, The House of Kalumba, The Town that was Mad, Crimes of the Heart, King Lear, Miss Tertiary Feel, Occupational Therapy Project, and the Opera performance of Macbeth. From 2002, she played a role on e.tv's Backstage. She appeared on Generations from 2006, receiving a best actress award from the South African Film and Television Awards. She has also appeared in commercials for Vanish, Clover, and Honda. She completed a diploma in Management Studies in 2010, with Wits Business School. In 2015, she landed the lucrative contract of brand ambassador to the international baby products brand Philips Avent.

In both 2006 and 2011, she was voted as one of FHM's 100 sexiest women in the world. In 2010 she was nominated for a YOU spectacular award for Favourite Actress. She was nominated Best Screen Villain in the Duku-Duku 2004 Awards, and Best Dressed Actress in 2009 at the South African Film and TV Awards.

In 2016, following her departure from Generations, Danke began playing a recurring role in South African soap opera, Isidingo. On the show, she plays the character Kgothalo.

Isidingo ended its 21-year run on 12 March 2020. Prior to Isidingo's conclusion, it was announced that Danke would have a starring role in Gomora, a new South African telenova on digital satellite and entertainment channel Mzansi Magic. In 2023 she took a maternity leave in Gomora because she is pregnant.

== Filmography ==
=== Television ===
TV Drama	Role
What’s Bothering Marc Lottering	
7de Laan	
Backstage	
Elna Liebe in Afrika	
Gomora	Onthatile Molefe-Ndaba
Generations	Dineo Tloale-Mashaba
Isidingo	Kgothalo Letsoalo

=== Drama ===
- Beyond The Veil
- The House of Kalumba
- The Town that was Mad (based on Under Milk Wood)
- King Lear
- The Suit
- Miss Tertiary Feel

== Awards and nominations ==
In 2010, Katlego received the best actress award at the South Africa film and TV awards (SAFTAS) for her character as "Dineo Mashaba" on Generations.

=== Royalty Soapie Awards ===
Year	Nominee / work	Award	Result	Ref.
2023	Herself	Outstanding Lead Actress	Won	
2023	Herself	Viewer’s Choice: Best Actress	Nominated	
