= Collen Mashawana =

South African businessman and philanthropist

Dr. Collen Mashawana
- Born: September 1, 1981 (age 45); Venda, Limpopo, South Africa
- Education: Henley Business School
- Occupations: Businessman and philanthropist
- Known for: Afribiz Invest; Collen Mashawana Foundation

Dr. Collen Mashawana (born 1 September 1981) is a South African businessman, philanthropist, and entrepreneur.

== Early life and education ==
Dr. Mashawana was born in Venda, Limpopo. He attended Tshishonga Primary School and completed high school at Liivha Private School. He studied Information Technology and later completed a Master of Business Administration (MBA) at Henley Business School.

In 2024, he was awarded an Honorary Doctorate in Philosophy by the University of South Africa (UNISA) in recognition of his contributions to business and philanthropy.

== Career ==
Dr. Mashawana began his career at Microsoft South Africa before joining Dimension Data in 2005, where he was later appointed National Public Sector Director. In 2008, he received the Esprit du Corps Award for leadership.

In 2005, he founded Afribiz Invest, an investment holding company with interests in consulting, construction, property development, ICT, mining, energy, training, and financial services. Afribiz employs over 500 people and has delivered more than 40,000 houses to underprivileged communities in South Africa.

The company has spearheaded large-scale projects such as Rama City and West Rand Mega Park, projected to create more than 50,000 jobs. Afribiz has also expanded internationally, with operations in South Africa, Botswana, Zimbabwe, Ghana, and Dubai.

== Philanthropy ==
In 2012, Dr. Mashawana established the Collen Mashawana Foundation (CMF), a non-profit organization focused on housing, water security, food security, education, and job creation.

Through CMF, Dr. Mashawana has overseen the construction and donation of more than 1,000 fully serviced homes to vulnerable families across South Africa.

The Foundation has also drilled and donated over 100 boreholes in water-scarce communities, including Hammanskraal and Giyani.

During the COVID-19 pandemic, CMF supported over 15,000 families with food parcels.

Since 2022, CMF has hosted an annual Elderly Christmas Celebration in Limpopo, bringing together more than 3,000 senior citizens each year.

== Recognition and Awards ==
- Entrepreneur of the Year – South African Men of the Year Initiative (2018).
- Named among the 100 Most Influential Africans by Reputation Poll International (2020).
- Philanthropic Leadership Award – Africa Giving Awards.
- Mzansi Men of Influence Award (2025).
- Legend Awards (2025).
- African Philanthropist Award – Afri Heritage Awards (2026).
