= The Four of Us (TV series) =

South African drama television series

- Genre: Telenovela
- Created by: Phathutshedzo Makwarela; Gwydion Beynon
- Written by: Thato Dipholo; Shitshembiso Mabasa; Brigette Madiba; Florence Mashadi Rapeu
- Directed by: Krijay Govender
- Starring: Sindi Dlathu; S'dumo Mtshali; Thembinkosi Mthembu; Kealeboga Masango; Dumisani Dlamini; Hope Mbhele; Rami Chuene; Nthabiseng Kgosana; Sicelo Buthelezi; Seipati Mahamu
- Country of origin: South Africa
- Original languages: English; Zulu; Pedi

Production
- Running time: 22-24 minutes
- Production company: Tshedza Pictures

Original release
- Network: e.tv; Netflix

The Four Of Us is a new telenovela produced by Tshedza Pictures airing on e.tv at 8PM weeknights with episodes streaming on Netflix the following day, it replaced long running soapie Scandal!.

== Premise ==
The telenovela comes after the channel canned its longest running soapie Scandal! which has been on air for 23 years. The channel then announced that highly acclaimed Tshedza Pictures will produce a replacing telenovela. This will mark the first collaboration between the channel and the production company. In early April, Sindi Dlathu and Rami Chuene were added to the cast while later revealing the name of the series. In mid May, Sdumo Mtshali and Thembinkosi Mthembu were added to cast. The first season of the family drama is slated for a total 260 episodes.

== Cast ==
=== Main cast ===
- Sindi Dlathu as Busani Dlomo
- S'dumo Mtshali as Bobbi Dlomo
- Thembinkosi Mthembu as Banzi Dlomo
- Kealeboga Masango as Balungile Dlomo
- Dumisani Dlamini as Papi
- Hope Mbhele as Ndumi Nhlapho
- Rami Chuene as Vera
- Nthabiseng Kgosana as Bassie
- Sicelo Buthelezi as Kopano
- Seipati Mahamu as Lethabo

=== Supporting cast ===
- Pascaline Phale as Mafusi
- Lebohang Lephatsoana as Melusi
- Sibongile Nojila
- Nombulelo Letsosa as Luyanda
- Quinton Madlala as Mnini
- Tebogo Malapane as Ntando
- Kgaogelo Makgoba as Mathapelo

== Release ==
The series aired its first episodes on June 29, 2026 at 8PM SAST on broadcasting channel e.tv , and the first episode was released on Netflix the following day on June 30th.
