= DStv Mzansi Viewers' Choice Awards =

South African television award show

- Current: 2022 DStv Mzansi Viewers' Choice Awards
- Country: South Africa
- Presented by: DStv
- First award: August 26, 2017; 9 years ago
- Website: http://www.mzansimagic.tv/dstvmvca

Television/radio coverage
- Network: Mzansi Magic

The DStv Mzansi Viewers' Choice Awards is a South African award show presented by DStv. The awards honour the year's biggest achievements in television, radio, music, sports, and comedy, voted by viewers living in South Africa.

== Award ceremonies (by year) ==
In both 2017 and 2018, the venue for the event was at Sandton Convention Centre, Johannesburg

Year	Date	Host(s)	Performers
2017	26 August 2017	Bonang Matheba	Lady Zamar, Prince Kaybee and Zodwa Wabantu; AKA and Anatii; Thandiswa Mazwai; Lebo Sekgobela; Tshedi Mholo and Cassper Nyovest; Hugh Masekela; DJ Cleo, Winnie Khumalo and Busiswa
2018	24 November 2018	Bonang Matheba	Team Mosha, Sandy, Sun-El Musician and Simmy; Bucie, Nokwazi and Sho Madjozi; Mlindo The Vocalist, Sjava and Saudi; Khaya Mthethwa, Ntokozo Mbambo and Dumi Mkokstad; Rebecca Malope; Kwesta; Mafikizolo; DJ Maphorisa, Moonchild Sanelly, DJ Raybe and Zulu Mkhatini
2020	14 March 2020	Minnie Dlamini	TBA
2021 not held
2022	25 June 2022	Lawrence Maleka	

== Award Categories ==
=== Current Categories ===
- Favourite Personality Of The Year
- Favourite Song Of The Year
- Favourite TV Presenter
- Favourite Comedian
- Favourite Rising Star
- Favourite Radio Personality
- Favourite Actor
- Favourite Actress
- Favourite Music Artist/Group
- Favourite DJ
- Favourite Sports Personality
- Ultimate Viewers' Choice

=== Special Categories ===
- 1Life Life Changer Award
- Lifetime Achievement Award
