= Plus TV Africa =

Nigerian TV station

- Country: Nigeria
- Availability: Africa
- Area: Nigeria
- Key people: Lekan Ogunbanwo
- Official website: Plus TV Africa

Plus TV Africa is a Nigerian pan-African news channel owned by General News and Entertainment Company and broadcast across Africa via the StarTimes dish platform, on DStv Channel 408 from 3 April 2020, and on its YouTube channel. The TV station airs in over 30 countries with more than 12 million viewers across Africa.
