= Youngins =

South African television series

- Genre: Drama
- Created by: Gwydion Beynon; Phathutshedzo Makwarela
- Written by: Nandisa Mkhize (HW.); Luthando Nkambule; Mbalizethu Zulu; Pretty Mkwanazi; Oratile Mogoje; Thembakuye Madlala; Siya Mseleku; Alex Xolo; Melody Ngomane; Tk Sebothoma; Mapule Mokete; Pumela Sizani; Thomo Tshipinyane; Khanyani Luhlongwane; Thabiso Rammala; Thulile Mthembu; Zimvo Radani; Khanyi Luhlongwane
- Directed by: Thembalethu Mfebe; Sandile Mdluli; Nthabiseng Tau
- Starring: Ayakha Ntunja; Kealeboga Masango; Lebohang Lephatsoana; Thabiso Ramotshela; Toka Mtabane
- Composer: Brendan Jury
- Country of origin: South Africa
- Original languages: English; Xhosa; Zulu; Afrikaans; SeSotho; TshiVenda
- No. of seasons: 3
- No. of episodes: 135

Production
- Executive producers: Gwydion Beynon; Phathutshedzo Makwarela; Marc Jury; Nomsa Philiso; Khanyi Nxumalo; Nicola van Niekerk; Khanyisile Nxumalo; Allan Sperling
- Producers: Bradley Joshua; Benjamin Overmeyer
- Production locations: Johannesburg; Gauteng; Soweto; (Note: Each season was shot in various cities in South Africa)
- Cinematography: Ntobeko Dlamini
- Editors: Nandipha Mehlomakulu; Sphiwe Nhlumayo; Siwelile Mbanjwa; Nonhlanhla Nxumalo; Natalie Varoy; Pretty Mkwanazi; Lubabalo Mayaba
- Running time: 21–24 minutes
- Production company: Tshedza Pictures

Original release
- Network: Showmax
- Release: 12 February 2024

Youngins is a South African telenovela teen drama television series developed by Tshedza Pictures for Showmax starring Ayakha Ntunja, Toka Mtabane, Thabiso Ramotshela, Tshepo Matlala, and Tabile Tau. Set in Johannesburg, Gauteng, and Soweto, the series follows a scholarship student fleeing a dark family secret in KZN who finds her new life at an elite Johannesburg boarding school torn apart by a forbidden romance and a deadly conspiracy that connects her past to the school's most powerful family.

== Series overview ==
The first three episodes of Season 1 premiered on Monday, while the remaining three episodes were released weekly on Thursdays. Afterward, Showmax announces that from Season 2 and Season 3, three episodes will be released every Friday.

Season	Episodes	Originally released	
Season	Episodes	First released	Last released
1	45	February 12, 2024	May 16, 2024
2	45	November 15, 2024	February 21, 2025
3	27	September 19, 2025	TBA

=== Season 1 (2024) ===
Youngins focuses on the "Big 5's" bond as they break rules, sneak out to club parties, and share the traumas of their home lives (including Khaya's abusive father and Buhle's pastor father's grooming). The carefree high school drama takes a dark turn when Amo discovers the school's beloved Principal Mthembu is a predator grooming a student named Zintle.

=== Season 2 (2024-25) ===
Overall, Season 2 focuses on the main characters growing up as they deal with the devastating consequences of their fight for justice in the previous season, while grappling with new forms of betrayal, addiction, and blackmail.

=== Season 3 (2025) ===
The final season brings the consequences of the "Big 5's" actions to a head. The group is immediately arrested and forced to face a court trial regarding the events of the previous season, including the death of TK.

== Cast ==
=== Main cast ===
- Ayakha Ntunja as Amo
- Kealeboga Masango as Buhle
- Lebohang Lephatsoana as Tumelo
- Thabiso Ramotshela as Mahlatse
- Toka Mtabane as Khaya

=== Supporting cast ===
- Tabile Tau as Sefako
- Amogelang Telekelo as Palesa
- Kadia Banyini as Mazambane (also known as. Mzambane)
- Tshepo Matlala as Tshepo
- Simo Magwaza as Mr. Ramathuba
- Sannah Mchunu as Matron Lulu
- Keneilwe Matidze as Pearl
- Gaositoe Moloke as Alex
- Loyiso MacDonald as Principal Mthembu
- Lihle Ngubo as Zintle
- Slindokuhle Tshabalala as Puseletso

=== Recurring cast ===
- Baatseba Masela as Receptionist
- Eyethu Myeza as Lesedi
- Ncibijani Madlala as Freddy
- Vuyani Mgungunyeka as Pastor Musa
- Sibongile Phakathi as Mamello
- Rantsatsi Rantsatsi as Detective Khumalo
- Maki Mokhitli as Mary
- Londiwe Nene as Aunti Thuli
- Thabo Setati as Security Guard
- Ayanda Sishuba as Banele
- Gomolemo Tsatsi as Buhle's Friend
- Winnie Kunene as Lillian
- Lungile Radebe as Kabelo
- Albio Skhikwambane as Dorm Master
- Loungo Masire as Palesa Mum
- Nqobile Magwaza as Social Worker
- Natasha Hlungwana as Buhle's Friend
- Faith Ngubo Mrs. Tshabalala
- Katlego Mzizi as Buhle's Friend
- Koketso Mantshonyane as Uncle Snake Face
- Moeketsi Mokoena as Mazambane's Friend
- Ntwenhle Gumede as Lisa
- Sipho Mbele as Vusi
- Oratile Dithakgiso as Tshepi
- Linda Lukhele as Police Officer
- Tumelo Matlala as Sello
- Siphiwe Nkabinde as Magistrate Mthimkhulu
- Ukho Samela as Innocent Boy
- Sazi Ndlovu as School Governing Body
- Mapula Mokete as Lerato
- Reitumetse Moruri as Teacher
- Carol Tolo as Mrs. Hlatshwayo
- Mohau Mashala as Buhle's Friend
- Phakamani Mbuyazi as Maintenance Guy
- Vallery Rachosi as Aggressive Girl
- Katleho Mabote as Tokollo
- Kheziya Mthombeni as Choir Girl
- Tebogo Setati as Security Guard
- Sibongile Tshabalala as Matric Life Science Teacher
- Vusi Nkuna as Mr. Hlatshwayo
- Nia Brown as Buhle's Attorney
- Sibusiso Sibeko as Uniformed Police
- Simon Lebaka as Prison Guard
- Bandile Mokoena as Hot UJ Guy
- Rethabile Mabalane as Grade 10 Girl
- Xoliswa Nxele as Lungile
- Mbuso Simelani as Bouncer
- Mary Chidi as Flirty Girl
- Brenda Ntanza as D.O.E
- Honey Madavhu as Gossip Girl
- Ofentse Mohlare as Horny Boy
- Tebogo Tsweu as Themba
- Mandisa Shiba as Horny Boy
- Khensani Mabunda as Zinhle's Friend
- Toss as Musical Performer
- Masego Mekgwe as Asanda
- Tshepiso Modipa as Learner
- Collin Sepomatla as Unserious Uncle
- Madidmalo Monama as Nurse
- Naledi Mphahlele as IT Girl
- Lerato Ngcobo as Tuckhop Lady
- Thando Dube as Grade 10 Girl
- Karabo Ngubane as Thembeka
- Kgatoentle Dube as Luyanda
- Noxolo Tshabalala as Tuckshop Lady
- Karabo Mphuti as Bafana
- Nakisani Manenje as Zinhle's Friend
- Khaya Dube as Horny Boy
- Ntombifuthi Baloyi as Gossip Girl
- Sijabulisiwe Khumalo as Neo
- Simphiwe Sip Nkabinde as Magistrate Mthimkhulu

== Production ==
=== Development ===
On 30 January 2024, Showmax announced Youngins as Tshedza Pictures third production on the streaming platform, after the success of Adulting. Following the announcement the lead director of the series was revealed as Themba Mfebe. The creator of the series was led by Gwydion Beynon, and Phathutshedzo Makwarela.

In November 2024, Showmax confirmed a second season.

On 19 June 2025, Showmax announced the final season of the series to be set at Soweto.

=== Casting ===
The cast was reported following the announcement of the first season, with a line-up of Kealeboga Masango, Lebohang Lephatsoana, Toka Mtabane, Thabiso Ramotshela, Tabile Tau, Tshepo Matlala, Lihle Ngubo, Katlego Moloke, Loyiso MacDonald, Sanna Mchunu, and Keneilwe Matidze.

== Reception ==
=== Awards and nominations ===
Year	Award	Category	Recipient	Result	Ref
2024	The Feather Awards SA	Media Award of the Year	Youngins	Nominated	
2024	National Film & TV Awards	Best Newcomer	Keabetswe Masango (Youngins season 1)	Nominated	
