= Sana Mchunu =

South African actress

- Born: Sannah Mchunu; 19 March 1972 (age 54); Soweto, South Africa
- Occupations: Director & Actress
- Years active: 2013–present
- Known for: Mzansi Bioskop Movies & Zodwa on Gomora
- Children: 7

Sannah 'Sana' Mchunu (born 19 March 1972) is a South African actress. She is best known for the roles in the television serials such as; eKasi: Our Stories, Muvhango, The River and Gomora. In 2025 she was seen in Amalanga Awafani where she played the role of Majele.

== Personal life ==
Mchunu was born on 19 March 1972 in Mofolo North, Soweto, South Africa. She could not finish school due to having children at a very young age.

At the age of 14, she became pregnant with her first child.She then welcomed her second child at the age of 19. She fell pregnant again after her parents sent her back to school. After her parents died, she lived with the father of her fourth child. When she became pregnant with her fifth child, her husband started to physically and emotionally abuse her. After all that turmoil, she left the children with him. Currently, she is a mother to seven children.

== Career ==
In her teen years, Sana used to dance for the late Brenda Fassie, which was later interrupted by her multiple pregnancies. She went to audition under the guidance of her friend, Winnie Khumalo. She was later selected to star in eKasi: Our Stories in a supporting role.

In 2013, Sana joined the fifth season of e.tv anthology series eKasi: Our Stories and played the role "Mrs Simelane" often called "Sis K". She continued to star in the sixth season of the series playing multiple roles such as "Rebecca", "Mrs. Khumalo", and "Gladys". She then played the role of "Grace Letsoalo" in the Mzansi Magic miniseries Vuka Mawulele. In the same year she appeared in two more serials: as "Mrs Qoboza" in SABC1 mystery thriller End Game, and as "Sibu" in Mzansi Magic mini-serial Shabangu P.I.. In 2014, she appeared in most of the telecast television serials in South Africa: SABC1 drama Sticks and Stones (as "Aunty Nena"), SABC1 docudrama Amagugu (as "Lizzy"), SABC2 drama Gauteng Maboneng second season (as "Rebecca"), Moja Love telenovela Hope (as "Nelly") and in SABC1 drama thriller Ihawu (as "Rebo Modise"). Meanwhile, her most notable television role was as "Nomarashiya" in the SABC2 soap opera Muvhango.

In 2015, she joined the Mzansi Magic soap opera Isibaya and played the role "Ma Ruth".In 2016, she appeared in the second season of the Mzansi Magic serial It's Complicated as "Nobesuthu". In the same year, she appeared in the SABC2 telenovela Keeping Score and later starred as "Tryphina" in the second season of the SABC1 docudrama Ngempela. In 2017, she starred as the "Mayor's Wife" in the second season of the Mzansi Magic telenovela Ring of Lies and as "MaGumede" in the fourth season of the SABC1 comedy serial Ses'Top La.

In 2018, she starred in the 1Magic telenovela The River with the role "Matilda" and continued in the second season of the show. In 2019, she played the role of "Mam Lindi" in e.tv supernatural serial Isipho and later joined the fourth season of the Mzansi Magic drama The Queen starring as "Tryphina". In 2020, Sana appeared in the Mzansi Magic telenovela Gomora as "Zodwa" where her role has received critical acclaim.

In 2026, she starred in the SABC1 telenovela Amalanga Amafani with the role of "Majele" she first aired in the second season of the show.

== Filmography ==
Year	Film	Role	Genre	Ref.
2013	Vuka Mawulele	Grace Letsoalo	TV series	
2013	eKasi: Our Stories	Mrs Simelane/Sis K/Rebecca/Mrs. Khumalo/Gladys	TV series	
2013	End Game	Mrs Qoboza	TV series	
2013	Shabangu P.I.	Sibu	TV series	
2013	Stepfather Se Voët	Tamsy	Film	
2014	Sticks and Stones	Aunty Nena	TV series	
2014	Amagugu	Lizzy	Film	
2014	Gauteng Maboneng	Rebecca	TV series	
	Generations	Guest role	TV series	
2014	Hope	Nelly	TV series	
2014	Ihawu	Rebo Modise	TV series	
2015	Isibaya	Ma Ruth	TV series	
2016	It's Complicated	Nobesuthu	TV series	
2016	Keeping Score	Sunday Voice	TV series	
	Muvhango	Nomarashiya	TV series	
2016	Ngempela	Tryphina	TV series	
	Rhythm City	Machiliza	TV series	
2017	Ring of Lies	Mayor's Wife	TV series	
2017	Ses'Top La	MaGumede	TV series	
2018	The River	Matilda	TV series	
2019	Isipho	Mam Lindi	TV series	
2019	The Queen	Tryphina	TV series	
2020–2023	Gomora	Zodwa	TV series	
2024	Youngins (Showmax series)	Matron Lulu	TV series	
2026	Amalanga Awafani	Majele	TV series	

== Awards ==
Year	Award ceremony	Category	Results	Ref.
2022	Mzansi Viewer's Choice Awards	Favourite Actress	Won	
2024	National Film and Television Awards	Best Supporting Actress in a TV Series 2024	Won	
