= Robert Marawa =

South African journalist (born 1973)

Robert Kennedy Marawa
- Born: 1 March 1973 (age 53); Vryheid, KwaZulu-Natal, South Africa
- Education: Hilton College
- Alma mater: University of the Witwatersrand
- Occupations: Sports presenter; radio talk show host; motivational speaker
- Employer(s): SuperSport; Metro FM; SABC
- Television: Laduma; Soccerzone; Blow by Blow
- Partner: Thando Thabethe
- Children: 1

Robert Marawa (born March 1, 1973) is a South African sports journalist, radio and television presenter. He is currently hosting Marawa Sports Worldwide aired on 947.

== Education ==
He attended Hilton College near Pietermaritzburg and the University of the Witwatersrand where he studied law, but later dropped out in 1992.

== Career ==
His television career began as a host of Laduma soccer show aired on SABC 1 in 1996. He worked as a presenter for SuperSport and is the former host of 083 Sports@6 on Metro FM.

Marawa and Azania Mosaka were co-host of the 12th ceremony of Metro FM Music Awards in 2013.

Marawa signed a deal with Primedia Broadcasting for his show Marawa Sports Worldwide in January 2023.

In January 2024, Marawa was announced as co-host of The Quantum Football Show alongside Skhumba Hlophe.

== Experience at Hilton College ==
In March 2025, Marawa opened up about his experience at Hilton College, a prestigious private boarding school for boys in KwaZulu Natal. In an interview on Sizwe Mpofu-Walsh’s podcast, SMWX on 20 March 2025, Marawa reflected on the challenges he faced during his time at the institution from 1987 to 1991 and since he graduated from the school he never wanted to see it again. He was among the first black students at the historically white school, and the cultural differences left a lasting impact. Black students in South African private schools have historically faced cultural alienation and challenges integrating into predominantly white environments. While this is changing as more students of colour enroll, Marawa’s experience is a reminder of the deep emotional scars these experiences can leave. He said his stance about the school softened in recent years, particularly after George Harris became headmaster of Hilton College in 2017. Harris, who had previously served as CEO of the Royal Bafokeng Institute, which brought a fresh perspective and a focus on inclusivity. This eventually prompted Marawa to return to the school for the first time in October 2024, he told Mpofu-Walsh.

== Achievements ==
=== Liberty Radio Awards ===
| Year | Nominee / work | Award | Result | Ref. |
|---|---|---|---|---|
| 2019 | | Sports Presenter | Won | |
| 2019 | Marawa Sport Worldwide | Sport Show | Won | |

=== South Africa Radio Awards ===
| Year | Nominee / work | Award | Result | Ref. |
|---|---|---|---|---|
| 2021 | | Best Sports Show | Won | |
