= Zenzo Ngqobe =

South African actor

- Occupation: Actor
- Notable work: The Forgotten Kingdom

Zenzo Ngqobe is a South African actor. He is known for portraying Butcher in Gavin Hood's 2005 Oscar-winning film Tsotsi. He is also known for portraying Atang in the 2013 film The Forgotten Kingdom. For his work in the television series The River, Ngqobe was nominated for the 2019 SAFTA Award for Best Supporting Actor in a Telenovela.

== Select filmography ==
- Tsotsi (2005)
- Blood Diamond (2006)
- The Forgotten Kingdom (2013)
- Mandela: Long Walk to Freedom (2013)
- The River
