= Backstage (South African TV series) =

South African television series

- Genre: Soap opera
- Created by: Mfundi Vundla
- Developed by: Deon Opperman
- Written by: Collin Oliphant
- Starring: Duncan Lawson; Katlego Danke; Paul du Toit; Shashi Naidoo; Pam Andrews
- Theme music composer: Dusk to Dawn
- Country of origin: South Africa
- Original language: English
- No. of seasons: Unspecified
- No. of episodes: Unspecified

Production
- Producer: Mfundi Vundla Grey Hofmeyr(Supervisor Producer)
- Production locations: Cape Town, South Africa
- Camera setup: Multi-Camera
- Running time: approx. 30 minutes
- Production companies: Bottom Line Entertainment, a wholly owned subsidiary of Tanstafl Holdings

Original release
- Network: e.tv
- Release: 1 May 2000 – 6 July 2007

Related
- Generations (South African TV series)

Backstage is a South African youth-targeted soap opera produced by Bottom Line Productions. The story is set at the fictional Vulindlela College, a performing arts college for youth in Johannesburg. The series originally aired on e.tv from 1 May 2000 to 6 July 2007, airing on weekday evenings at 18:30. The show was later cancelled and aired its last broadcast on 6 July 2007. A rebroadcast of Backstage premiered on e.tv on 5 January 2009, at 16:40.

== Synopsis ==
Backstage is a youth-soap opera in which kids from different backgrounds in South Africa come to a college of performing arts in downtown Johannesburg. The story follows the characters as they experience the trials and tribulations of performers all trying to be the best. The business they are involved in seems to deal with musicians, dancers and filmmakers alike. Besides school and the pressures that come with it, the story also revolves around the personal life of the students dealing with love, passion and betrayal throughout the plot. The head of the college, Ipeleng Theledi, deals with the stresses of running a professional college and dealing with the personal lives of the other characters, mainly the students. The lecturers who assist her are mainly Katlego Rathebe, Naomi Singh, Sebastian Young, Charmaine Jacobs and Keketso Chaka.

== Cancellation ==
E.tv cancelled the first running of Backstage in 2007. According to the channel, the reason given for cancelling the show was that "modern youth culture is dynamic and ever evolving, and it is the right time to adapt to these fresh challenges as well as the changing television market." According to Deon Opperman of Bottom Line Productions, the time was right for the channel "to aggressively compete in this primetime slot." The reason for cancellation may have arisen from the stiff competition from rival soap operas, such as SABC 1's Generations, SABC 2's 7de Laan and SABC 3's Isidingo.
