= Israel Matseke Zulu =

South African actor

- Born: Israel Sipho Makoe Matseke-Zulu
- Occupations: Actor, poet and dancer
- Notable work: Tsotsi, iNumber Number, Gomora

Israel Sipho Makoe Matseke-Zulu (formerly known as Israel Makoe) is a South African actor, poet and dancer primarily known for his roles in motion pictures like iNumber Number (2013) and its series sequel, Four Corners (2013), Tsotsi (2005), Hard to Get (2014) and Gomora (which he exited because his legs were immobile) just to mention few.y

== Personal life ==
Makoe is an ex-convict, he was incarcerated three years for car hijacking and housebreaking at Johannesburg Prison from 1996 to 1999. After his prison departure he has then playing thug/villain roles in most of his characters if not all.

== Filmography ==
Year	Film	Role	Notes
2005	Tsotsi		Film
2013	INumber Number	Skroef	Film
2013	Four Corners	Joburg	Film
2014	Hard to Get		
2020	Gomora	Don Buthelezi	TV series
2021	I Am All Girls	Pimp	Film
2022	Amandla	Shaka	Film
2023	Nikiwe		TV series
