= Connie Chiume =

South African actress and filmmaker (1952–2024)

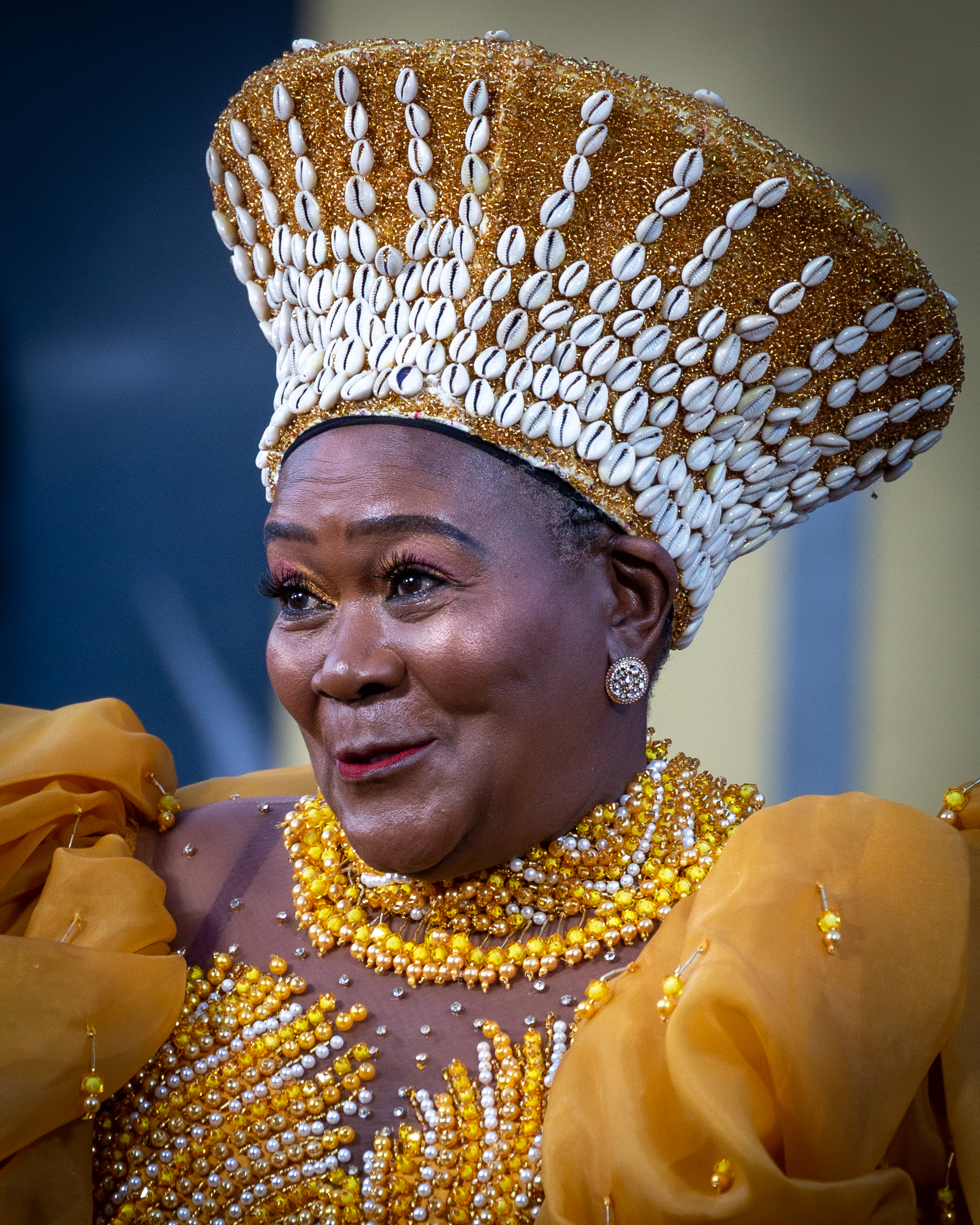
- Chiume at the Black Panther: Wakanda Forever premiere in 2022
- Born: Connie Temweka Gabisile Chiume; 5 June 1952; Welkom, Orange Free State, South Africa
- Died: 6 August 2024 (aged 72); Johannesburg, Gauteng, South Africa
- Occupations: Actress, filmmaker
- Years active: 1977–2024
- Children: 4

Connie Temweka Gabisile Chiume (5 June 1952 – 6 August 2024) was a South African actress and filmmaker. She was known for her film roles in Black Panther, Black Is King and Blessers. On television, she appeared in S'gudi S'nyasi, Yizo Yizo 2, Zone 14, Rhythm City and Gomora.

== Early life ==
Chiume was born on 5 June 1952 in the mining town of Welkom, South Africa. Her father Wright Tadeyo Chiume (d. 1983) was from Nkhata Bay, Malawi and her mother MaNdlovu (d. 2020) hailed from KwaZulu-Natal, South Africa. Her cousin, Ephraim Mganda Chiume is a Malawian politician.

Chiume spent her early childhood in Welkom. She completed her matric in the Eastern Cape and started training to become a nurse. However, she went on to graduate with a degree in teaching in 1976. In 1977, she left South Africa and became part of a touring musical group, visiting Greece and Israel with them.

== Career ==
Chiume began her acting career with roles in productions of Porgy and Bess, Ipi Ntombi, and Little Shop of Horrors. She returned to South Africa as apartheid was ending. She was cast as Thembi in the 1989 series Inkom' Edla Yodwa and then the 1990 film Warriors from Hell. In 2000, she won the award for Best Actress in a Drama Series at the South African Film and Television Awards (SAFTA).

In 2006, she starred in the stage productions of You Strike The Woman and You Strike The Rock. From 2007 to 2015, Chiume gained prominence through her role as Stella Moloi in the SABC1 drama series Zone 14, which earned her another SAFTA. She also received the Award for the Best Supporting Actress in a Drama during the 3rd SAFTA. In 2015, she appeared in the soap opera Rhythm City as Mamokete Khuse.

In 2018, Chiume played Zawavari, the elder of a mining tribe in the Marvel Cinematic Universe film Black Panther. She starred in this role again in the film's 2022 sequel Black Panther: Wakanda Forever.

In 2020, Chiume landed the role of Mam'Sonto Molefe in the drama series Gomora and appeared in Beyoncé's film Black Is King. In October 2020, she received a Feather Award nomination. In 2022, she received the lifetime achievement award at the South African Film and Television Awards.

== Personal life and death ==
Chiume was married from 1985 to 2004. She was a mother of four, with two sons and two daughters. She was born and raised in Welkom, South Africa.

Chiume died at the Garden City Hospital in Johannesburg on 6 August 2024, at the age of 72.

== Filmography ==
=== Film ===
Year	Title	Role	Notes
1990	Warriors from Hell	Marita	
1994	The Air Up There	Mrs Urudu	
1999	Chikin Biznis ... The Whole Story!	Thoko	
2000	I Dreamed of Africa	Wanjiku	
2004	In My Country	Virginia Tabata	
2013	Fanie Fourie's Lobola	Zinzi	
2015	Lerato	Pastor	Short film
2018	Black Panther	Zawavari	
2019	Losing Lerato	Gogo on Bus	
2019	Blessers	Ma-Lerato	
2020	What Did You Dream?	Koko	Short film
2020	Black Is King	Sarabi	
2020	Seriously Single	Dineo's Mom	
2022	Black Panther: Wakanda Forever	Zawavari	
2024	Heart of the Hunter		
2025	Meet the Khumalos	Mavis Khumalo	

=== Television ===
Year	Title	Role	Notes	Ref
1989	Inkom' Edla Yodwa	Thembi	Television film	
1994	The Line	Rosie	Television film	
1997	A Woman of Color	Government Official	Television film	
1998	Tierärztin Christine III: Abenteuer in Südafrika	—N/a Mohlolohadi as thakane	Television film; directed	
2003	Soul City			
2004	Mazinyo Dot Q	Ma Mavuso		
2007–2015	Zone 14	Stella Moloi		
2015	Rhythm City	Mamokete Khuse		
2017	Thula's Vine	Nothando		
2020	Queen Sono	Nana Rakau		
2020	Gomora	Mam'Sonto Molefe		
2020	Choices			
2024	Soon Comes Night Blood Legacy	Mohlolohadi as thakane as Madlamini Ndlovu	Television film	

== Achievements ==
=== South Africa Film and Television Awards ===
Year	Nominee / work	Award	Result	Ref.
2024	Herself	Best Actress in a Telenovela	Nominated	
