= Sesotho grammar =

This article presents a brief overview of the grammar of the Sesotho language and provides links to more detailed articles.

== Typology ==
The Sesotho language may be described in several ways depending on the aspect being considered.

- It is an agglutinative language. It constructs whole words by joining discrete roots and morphemes with specific meanings, and may also modify words by similar processes.
- Its basic word order is SVO. However, because the verb is marked with the subject and sometimes the object, this order may be changed to emphasise certain parts of the predicate.
- It is a tonal language; more specifically, a complex grammatical tone language. See Sotho tonology.
- It has no grammatical case marking on the noun. Nominal roles are indicated by a combination of word order and agreement markers on the verb, with no change to the nouns themselves.
- It has a complex grammatical gender system, but this does not include natural gender. See Sotho nouns.
- It has head-first order, though it may be changed for emphasis. If an inflected qualificative is placed before the head, then it is technically a qualificative pronoun.
- It is a pro-drop language. Verbs may be used without explicitly specifying the subject or the object with substantives (nouns or pronouns).

== Formatives ==
Bantu languages are agglutinative — words are constructed by combining discrete formatives (a.k.a. "morphemes") according to specific rules, and sentences are constructed by stringing together words according to somewhat less strict rules. Formatives alone cannot constitute words; formatives are the component parts of words.

These formatives may be classed generally into roots, stems, prefixes, concords, suffixes, verbal auxiliaries, enclitics, and proclitics.

Roots are the most basic irreducible elements of words and are immutable (except under purely phonetic changes). Entire words are built from roots by affixing other formatives around the root as appendages; every word (except contractions and compounds) contains exactly one root, from which it derives its most basic meaning (though, technically speaking, the root by itself does not really have any meaning). Roots are the basis of the Sotho parts of speech.

The following words:

1. [huˌʀutɑ] ho ruta ('to teach')
2. [bɑliˌʀutʼile] ba le rutile ('they taught you [pl]')
3. [ʀɪ'ɑʀutʼɑnɑ] re a rutana ('we teach one another')
4. [hɑbɑliˌʀutʼisise] ha ba le rutisise ('they do not teach you [pl.] properly')
5. [muˌʀutʼehi] morutehi ('an academic')
6. [tʰutʼɔ] thuto ('education')
7. [muˌ'itʰutʼi] moithuti ('learner')

are all formed from the root [ʀutʼ] -rut-.

Although in some cases various phonetic processes may ultimately change the root's form in predictable ways (such as the nasalization in the last two examples above) the root itself is considered to be unchanged.

There can be no doubt that words never emerged simply as roots. The root is a dead thing — the study of roots is primarily to aid the compilation of dictionaries, to further the study of comparative Bantu linguistics, and to help trace the evolution and connections of different languages. Many roots are shared by a wide range of Bantu languages.

Some further examples of roots:

- [tʰʊ] **-tho** (Proto-Bantu *-jîntu) ⇒ [mʊtʰʊ] motho ('Bantu-speaking person'), [bʊtʰʊ] botho ('Ubuntu')
- [it͡sʼi] **-itsi** (Proto-Bantu *-jîgî) ⇒ [met͡sʼi] metsi ('water') (note the vowel coalescence: class 6 [mɑ] ma- + /i/ i ⇒ [me] me-)
- [ʀʷɑ] **-rwa** (Proto-Bantu *-tua) ⇒ [mʊʀʷɑ] morwa ('a Khoisan person'), [bʊʀʷɑ] Borwa ('South')
- [ʒ] **-j-** (Proto-Bantu *-di-) ⇒ [hʊʒɑ] ho ja ('to eat'), [diʒɔ] dijo ('food'), [sɪʒɪsɔ] sejeso ('a magical poison')
- [hʊlʊ] **-holo** (Proto-Bantu *-kudu) ⇒ [hʊlʊ] -holo ('large'), [bʊhʊlʊ] boholo ('size'), [lɪxʊlʊ] lekgolo ('one hundred'), [mʊhʊlʊ] moholo ('an older person'), [mʊhʊlʷɑnɪ] moholwane ('elder brother')
- [ʀitʰi] **-rithi** ⇒ [muˌʀitʰi] morithi ('shade'), [siˌʀitʰi] serithi ('human spirit')
- [ʀɪ] **-re** (Proto-Bantu *-ti) ⇒ [hʊʀɪ] ho re ('to say')
- [dimʊ] **-dimo** (Proto-Bantu *-dîmu) ⇒ [muˌdimʊ] Modimo ('God') (traditionally never used in the plural), [bɑdimʊ] Badimo ('ancestors') (does not exist in the singular), [Buˌdimʊ] Bodimo ('African Traditional Religion'), [liˌdimʊ] ledimo ('cannibal'), [dimʊ] Dimo (the name of an ogre character)
- [edi] **-edi** (Proto-Bantu *-jedî) ⇒ [ŋʷedi] ngwedi ('moon'), [xʷedi] kgwedi ('month')
- [ʒɑ] **-ja** (Proto-Bantu *-bua) ⇒ [ɲ̩t͡ʃʼɑ] ntja ('dog')
- [ɬɑnʊ] **-hlano** (Proto-Bantu *-caanu) ⇒ [ɬɑnʊ] -hlano ('five')

Note that although it is often true that the common root of a number of words may be defined as having some inherent meaning, very often the connection between words sharing common roots is tentative, and this is further evidence that prefix-less noun roots and stems are ultimately meaningless. Roots from a common source help to connect nouns with certain meanings, and often the class prefixes are merely incidental.

- [buˌsi'u] bosiu ('night'), and [t͡sʰi'u] tshiu ('24-hour day')
- [lɪlʊkʼɔ] leloko ('family/lineage/clan'), and [mʊlʊkʼɔ] moloko ('generation')
- [bʊʀɔkʼɔ] boroko ('sleep'), and [ditʰɔkʼɔ] dithoko ('rheum')
- [bɔkʼɔ] boko ('brain matter'), and [mɔkʼɔ] moko ('bone marrow')

Stems are not much different from roots, and the difference between them is fairly arbitrary. Though all roots are also stems, stems often include derivational suffixes, which roots never include. Additionally, the ending [ɑ] -a is included in the verb stem but not in the root (if it was truly part of the core root then it wouldn't be replaced in verb derivations and conjugations).

For example, from the verb root [ʀɑʀ] -rar- one may derive several words, including the following (stems in bold):

[hʊʀɑʀɑ] ho **rara** ('to entangle')

[mʊʀɑʀɑ] mo**rara** (nom. 3) ('grapes')
[lɪʀɑʀɑ] le**rara** (nom. 5) ('a single grape')
[hʊʀɑʀɑbʊl̩lɑ] ho **rarabolla** ('to solve')
[hʊʀɑʀɑhɑnɑ] ho **rarahana** (ass. vb.) ('to be entangled together')

[hʊʀɑʀɑhɑnɛlɑ] ho **rarahanela** (app. ass. vb.) ('to spiral')

[hʊʀɑʀɑnɑ] ho **rarana** (recip. vb.) ('to entangle each other')

[mɑʀɑʀɑnɛ] ma**rarane** (nom. rel.) ('entangled')

[hʊʀɑʀɛlɑ] ho **rarela** (app. vb.) ('to twist')
[hʊʀɑʀʊl̩lɑ] ho **rarolla** (rev. vb.) ('to untangle')

[tʰɑʀʊl̩lɔ] **tharollo** (nom. 9; pl. 10 [di] di-) ('solution')

These may all be listed under the same headword in a dictionary.

Note how, in the above example, not only do many of the words have slightly unexpected or expanded meanings, but the form [hʊʀɑʀɑbʊl̩lɑ] ho rarabolla uses an irregular derivation pattern.

Prefixes are affixes attached to the fronts of words (noun class prefixes are called such by convention, even though bare roots are not independent words). These are distinct from concords, since changing the prefix of a word may radically alter its meaning, while changing the concord attached to a stem does not change that stem's meaning.

[kʼɪlɪnɑnɛ'ɔ] Ke lenaneo ('it is a programme')

Concords are similar to prefixes in that they appear before the word stem. Verbs and qualificatives used to describe a noun are brought into agreement with that noun by using the appropriate concords.

There are seven basic types of concords in Sesotho. In addition, there are two immutable prefixes used with verbs that function similarly to concords.

[bɑt͡ɬʼa'ɪʀɑlɑ] Ba tla e rala ('they shall design it')

Suffixes

There are numerous suffixes in Sesotho serving varied functions. For example, verbs may be derived from other verbs through the employment of several verbal suffixes. Diminutives, augmentatives, and locatives may all be derived from nouns through the use of several suffixes. Most suffixes, except the noun locative suffix and verb inflexional suffixes, are derivational and create new stems.

Strictly speaking the final vowel -a in verb stems is a suffix, as it is often regularly replaced by other vowels in the derivation and inflexion of verbs and nouns.

[hɑ'ɑ'ɑbu'ɑɲeweŋ̩] Ha a a bua nyeweng ('she did not speak at the court trial')

Verbal auxiliaries are not to be confused with auxiliary verbs or deficient verbs. They may appear as prefixes or as infixes. Basically, all formatives that may be affixed to the verb root, excluding suffixes and the objectival and subjectival concords, are verbal auxiliaries.

These include prefixes such as ha- used to negate verbs, and infixes such as -ka- used to form potential tenses.

The infix -a- used to form the past subjunctive (not to be confused with the infix -a- used to form the present indicative positive and the perfect indicative negative; and also used as a "focus marker") merges with the subjectival concord resulting in what is often termed the "auxiliary concord."

[kʼɪɑt͡ɬʼɑ] Ke a tla ('I am coming')
[hɑkʼɪnot͡ɬʼɑ] Ha ke no tla ('I shall not come')

Infix verbal auxiliaries may be further divided into simple infixes and verbal infixes. The main difference lies in the fact that, when forming the relative construction (participial sub-mood) of a verbal complex employing the infix, the verbal infixes may be detached from the main verb and carry the -ng suffix with the main verb converted to an infinitive object, while a verb using a simple infix has to carry the suffix itself.

Ba ka bona ('they might see') [bɑkʼɑbɔnɑ] (simple infix used) ⇒ Ba ka bonang ('those who might see') [bɑkʼɑbɔnɑŋ̩]
Ba tla bona ('they shall see') [bɑt͡ɬʼɑbɔnɑ] (verbal infix used) ⇒ Ba tlang ho bona ('those who shall see') [bɑt͡ɬʼɑŋ̩ hʊbɔnɑ]

Enclitics (leaning-on words) are usually suffixed to verbs and convey a definite meaning. They were probably once separate words.

They may be divided into two categories: those that draw forward the stress (as normal suffixes), and those that don't alter the word's stress. The second type may result in words that don't have the stress on the penult (as is usual with Sesotho words).

Ha a sa le yo ('he is no longer there') [hɑˈɑsɑlɪjɔ] (stress on the penult)
Thola bo! ('please keep quiet!') [ˈtʰʊlɑbo] (stress on the antepenultimate syllable)

Proclitics are clitics that appear at the fronts of words. There is only one regular proclitic in Sesotho — le- — which is normally prefixed to nouns, pronouns, qualificatives, and adverbs as a conjunction, to convey the same meaning as English "and" when used between substantives. Some Indo-European languages have a post-clitic with a similar meaning (for example Latin -que and Sanskrit च -ca).

It may also be used to express the idea of "together with" and "even."

[n̩tʼɑtʼelɪm̩mɛ] Ntate le mme ('my father and mother')
[kʼɪkʼɔpʼɑnɪlɪjɛnɑ] Ke kopane le yena ('I met with her')
[lɪbɔnɑhɑbɑxolʷɪ] Le bona ha ba kgolwe ('Even they do not believe')

There are also a number of curious utterances where the proclitic is used to express emphatic negatives.

[lɪxɑlɛ] Le kgale ('Never', lit. 'And a long time')
[lɪlɪtʰɔ] Le letho ('Nothing', lit. 'And something')
[lɪhʊkʼɑ] Le ho ka ('Never', lit. 'And to be able')

This is similar to the use of the Latin "et" ('and') to mean "even" or "not", as in the supposed last words of Caesar – "Et tu, Brute?" meaning "Not (or even) you Brutus?".

== The Sesotho word ==
The Sotho language is spoken conjunctively yet written disjunctively (that is, the spoken phonological words are not the same as the written orthographical words). In the following discussion, the natural conjunctive word division will be indicated by joining the disjunctive elements with the symbol • in the Sesotho and the English translation.

Batho ba•lelapa la•hae ba•a•mo•ahlola
people of•family of•his they•judge•him
'His family members judge him'

Certain observations about the Sesotho word (and those of many other Bantu languages in general) may be made:

- Each word has one part of speech, which can usually be determined from the root. Since Sesotho is predominately prefixing, the root is usually the last morpheme of the word, unless enclitics follow.

Not counting compounds and contractions, the word begins with zero or more proclitics, infixes, and prefixes, followed by a stem, followed by zero or more suffixes (which extend the stem) and enclitics.

For example, in the word [kʼɪ'ɑliˌdumedisɑ] Ke•a•le•dumedisa ('I•greet•you[pl]') the stem is the verb stem [dumɛlɑ] -dumel(a) ('agree') surrounded by the subjectival concord [kʼɪ] ke- (first person singular), the present definite positive indicative infix marker [ɑ] -a-, the objectival concord [lɪ] -le- (third person plural), and the verb extension [isɑ] -isa (causative, but in this case it gives the idiomatic meaning of "greet").

The phonological interactions can be quite complex:

[ʊ'ɑm̩pʼon̩t͡sʰɑ] O•a•mpontsha ('he•shows•me') subject concord [ʊ] o- + present indicative positive marker [ɑ] -a- + objectival concord -N- + verb stem [bɔn] -bon(a) (see) + causative extension [isɑ] -isa

Here the formatives are distorted by two instances of nasalization.

- Each word has one main stressed syllable.

No matter how many prefixes, suffixes, enclitics, and proclitics are appended to the word stem the complete word only has one main stressed syllable. This stress is most prominent on the final word in the sentence or "prosodic phrase."

Word stress
Audio sample of the examples

Ha•re•a•kgona ho•mo•eletsa hobane o•ne a•le manganga
we•failed to•advise•him because he•PAST he•COPULATIVE stubborn
'he was stubborn'

Re•tla•ya ha o•tjho
we•shall•go if you•say.so

Note the monosyllabic conjunctive [hɑ] ha.

Note that, unlike the Nguni languages, Sesotho does not have rules against juxtaposing strings of vowels:

A string of similar vowels
Audio sample of the example

[hɑ'ɑ'ɑpʼɑʀɑ] Ha•a•a•apara ('he•is•not•dressed') although the sequence [ɑ'ɑ] -a•a- (class 1 negative subjectival concord followed by present definite positive indicative marker) is usually pronounced as a long [ɑ] with a high falling tone, or simply as a short high tone.

Certain situations may make the word division complex. This can happen with contractions (especially with deficient verb constructions), and in some complex verb conjugations. In all these situations, however, each proper word has exactly one main stressed syllable.

== Parts of speech ==
Each complete Sesotho word belongs to some part of speech.

In form, some parts of speech (adjectives, enumeratives, some relatives, and all verbs) are radical stems, which need affixes to form meaningful words; others (possessives and copulatives) are formed from full words by the employment of certain formatives; the rest (nouns, pronouns, adverbs, ideophones, conjunctives, and interjectives) are complete words themselves, which may or may not be modified with affixes to form new words.

The difference between the four types of qualificatives is merely in the concords used to associate them with the noun or pronoun they qualify. Since the simplest copulatives do not use any verbs whatsoever (zero copula), entire predicative sentences in Sesotho may be formed without the use of verbs.
