= Sotho parts of speech =

The Sesotho parts of speech convey the most basic meanings and functions of the words in the language, which may be modified in largely predictable ways by affixes and other regular morphological devices. Each complete word in the Sesotho language must comprise some "part of speech."

There are basically twelve parts of speech in Sesotho. The six major divisions are purely according to syntax, while the sub-divisions are according to morphology and semantic significance.

Parts of speech
1. Substantives signify concrete or abstract concepts:
  1. Nouns
  2. Pronouns
2. Qualificatives qualify substantives:
  1. Adjectives
  2. Relatives
  3. Enumeratives
  4. Possessives
3. Predicatives signify an action or state connected with the substantive:
  1. Verbs
  2. Copulatives
4. Descriptives describe qualificatives, predicatives, or other descriptives:
  1. Adverbs
  2. Ideophones
5. Conjunctives introduce or join up sentences
6. Interjectives are exclamations

As a rule, Bantu languages do not have any prepositions or articles. In Sesotho, locatives are inflected substantives and verb imperatives are treated as interjectives. The division of the four qualificatives is dependent solely on the concords that they use. Cardinals are nouns but are given a separate section below.

In form, some parts of speech (adjectives, enumeratives, some relatives, some possessives, and all verbs) are radical stems which need affixes to form meaningful words; others (copulatives, most possessives, and some adverbs) are formed from full words by the employment of certain formatives; the rest (nouns, pronouns, some relatives, some adverbs, all ideophones, conjunctives, and interjectives) are complete words themselves which may or may not be modified with affixes to form new words. Therefore, the term "word classes" instead of the somewhat more neutral "parts of speech" would have been somewhat of a misnomer.

== Nouns ==
Pronouns:
- Absolute
- Demonstratives
  - This
  - That
  - That yonder
- Quantitative
- Qualificative

== Pronouns ==
There are four main types of pronouns in Sesotho: absolute, demonstrative, quantitive, and qualificative. Each pronoun is a complete word and may stand in place of the noun or right next to it (for emphasis).

Concords are NOT pronouns. Concords are usually mandatory in certain places while pronouns are often not. Pronouns cannot be used in place of concords. Pronouns are complete words while concords are strictly affixes.

The absolute, demonstrative, and quantitative pronouns
Class	Absolute	Demonstrative						Quantitative
Class	Absolute	1st. position		2nd. position		3rd. position		Quantitative
Class	Absolute	1st. form	2nd. form	1st. form	2nd. form	1st. form	2nd. form	Quantitative
First and second persons
(1st. pers. sg.)	[n̩nɑ] nna	—	—	—	—	—	—	—
(1st. pers. pl.)	[ʀʊnɑ] rona	—	—	—	—	—	—	—
(2nd. pers. sg.)	[wɛnɑ] wena	—	—	—	—	—	—	—
(2nd. pers. pl.)	[lʊnɑ] lona	—	—	—	—	—	—	—
Third persons and noun classes
Class 1(a).	[jɛnɑ] yena	[e'ʊ] eo	[enʷɑ] enwa	[e'ʊ] eo	[enʊ] eno	[jɑnɪ] yane	[elʷɑ] elwa	—
Class 2(a).	[bɔnɑ] bona	[bɑ'ɑ] baa	[bɑnɑ] bana	[bɑ'ʊ] bao	[bɑnʊ] bano	[bɑnɪ] bane	[bɑlɛ] bale	[boɬe] bohle
Class 3.	[ɔnɑ] ona	[o'ʊ] oo	[onɑ] ona	[o'ʊ] oo	[onʊ] ono	[wɑnɪ] wane	[olɑ] ole	[oɬe] ohle
Class 4.	[jɔnɑ] yona	[e'ɪ] ee	[enɑ] ena	[e'ʊ] eo	[enʊ] eno	[jɑnɪ] yane	[elɑ] ela	[joɬe] yohle
Class 5.	[lɔnɑ] lona	[le'ɪ] lee	[lenɑ] lena	[le'ʊ] leo	[lenʊ] leno	[lɑnɪ] lane	[lelɑ] lela	[loɬe] lohle
Class 6.	[ɔnɑ] ona	[ɑ'ɑ] aa	[ɑnɑ] ana	[ɑ'ʊ] ao	[ɑnʊ] ano	[ɑnɪ] ane	[ɑle] ale	[oɬe] ohle
Class 7.	[sɔnɑ] sona	[se'ɪ] see	[senɑ] sena	[se'ʊ] seo	[senʊ] seno	[sɑnɪ] sane	[selɑ] sela	[soɬe] sohle
Class 8.	[t͡sʼɔnɑ] tsona	[t͡sʼe'ɪ] tsee	[t͡sʼenɑ] tsena	[t͡sʼe'ʊ] tseo	[t͡sʼenʊ] tseno	[t͡sʼɑnɪ] tsane	[t͡sʼelɑ] tsela	[t͡sʼoɬe] tsohle
Class 9.	[jɔnɑ] yona	[e'ɪ] ee	[enɑ] ena	[e'ʊ] eo	[enʊ] eno	[jɑnɪ] yane	[elɑ] ela	[joɬe] yohle
Class 10.	[t͡sʼɔnɑ] tsona	[t͡sʼe'ɪ] tsee	[t͡sʼenɑ] tsena	[t͡sʼe'ʊ] tseo	[t͡sʼenʊ] tseno	[t͡sʼɑnɪ] tsane	[t͡sʼelɑ] tsela	[t͡sʼoɬe] tsohle
Class 14.	[bɔnɑ] bona	[bo'ʊ] boo	[bonɑ] bona	[bo'ʊ] boo	[bonʊ] bono	[bɑnɪ] bane	[bolɑ] bola	[boɬe] bohle
Class 15, 16, 17, 18.	[hɔnɑ] hona	[ho'ʊ] hoo	[honɑ] hona	[ho'ʊ] hoo	[honʊ] hono	[hɑnɪ] hane	[holɑ] hola	[joɬe] hohle

=== Absolute pronouns ===
These merely stand in place of nouns and say nothing else about them. They are formed from the pronominal concord of the noun (Doke & Mofokeng claims that the pronominal concord is actually derived from the absolute pronoun) plus the suffix -na. Note that any affixes attached to the pronoun do not change its form.

The tone pattern is [ _ ¯ ].

wena o batla eng? ('you, what do you want?') [wɛnɑʊbɑt͡ɬʼɑ ɪŋ̍] (the pronoun is merely used for emphasis)

When a verb has two objects, the second object cannot be indicated in Sesotho by a concord:

ke ba_{1} bontshitse yona_{2} ('I showed it_{2} to them_{1}') [kʼɪbɑbon̩t͡sʰit͡sʼe jɔnɑ].

=== Demonstrative pronouns ===
Sesotho has three positional types of pronouns (1 less than many other Bantu languages; the missing one being the 3rd. form "this here") each in two forms.

When the relative concord is used to form the demonstrative pronouns it appears with a more natural high tone instead of the irregular extra-high allotone. However, in the rarely used first form of the first demonstrative it appears with a low tone.

==== The first demonstrative ====
The first demonstrative signifies "this" indicating proximity to the speaker. It corresponds to Bantu 1st. position.

The first form has tone pattern [ _ ¯ ] and is formed by suffixing the relative concord with the vowel in the class prefix (the exception being class 1(a) using eo, due to its irregular concords, and class 9 uses ee). This pronoun is not very commonly used.

dintja tsee ('these dogs') [diɲ̩t͡ʃʼɑt͡sʼe'ɪ]

In common speech they are often simply shortened to the first syllable, and there is at least one commonly used formation where the pronoun for the first person singular is used as an enclitic.

ke nna o ('here I am') [kʼɪn̩nɑ'o]

The second form has tone pattern [ ¯ ¯ ] and is formed by suffixing -na to the relative concord (the exception being class 1(a) enwa, but it appears as ona in non-standard speech). These words have an irregular stress which falls on the final syllable.

batho ba ('these people') [bɑtʰʊbɑ]

==== The second demonstrative ====
The second demonstrative signifies "that" indicating relative distance from the speaker. It corresponds to Bantu 2nd. position.

The first form has tone pattern [ ¯ _ ] and suffixes -o to the relative concord.

sefofane seo ('that airplane') [sɪfʊfanɪse'ʊ].

This form is the one employed in indirect relative constructions

lesedi leo ke le bokellang ('the data which I am collecting') [lɪsedile'ʊkʼɪlɪbʊkʼɛl̩lɑŋ̍]

The second form has tone pattern [ ¯ ¯ ] and suffixes -no to the relative concord.

morero ono ('that purpose') [mʊʀɛʀɔonʊ]

==== The third demonstrative ====
The third demonstrative signifies "that yonder" indicating distance from both parties. It corresponds to Bantu 4th. position.

The first form has tone pattern [ ¯ ¯ ] and is formed by suffixing -ane to the relative concord. In this case the a interacts strongly with the vowel in the concord.

koloi yane ('that car there') [kʼolo'ijɑnɪ]
setshwantsho sane ('that picture there') [sɪt͡sʰʷɑn̩t͡sʰɔsɑnɪ]

The second form has tone pattern [ ¯ _ ] and is formed somewhat irregularly from the relative concord. The suffix is -la which changes to -le if the concord ends with an a. Class 1(a) has an irregular pronoun with elwa (but it appears as ole in non-standard speech). In common speech -le is used throughout.

naledi ela ('that star there') [nɑledielɑ]

=== Quantitative pronouns ===
While many other Bantu languages have several quantitative pronouns, Sesotho only has the [ɬe] -hle ('all') form. It has tone pattern [ ¯ ¯ ] and is formed from the pronominal concord for nouns (singular persons use class 1's concords and plural persons use class 2's concords).

letsatsi lohle ('the whole day') [lɪt͡sʼɑt͡sʼiloɬe]

=== Qualificative pronouns ===
Qualificative pronouns are qualificatives used substantivally in a sentence. They are basically formed when a qualificative is used without the substantive, or if it appears before the substantive.

Dikoloi tse ntle ('the beautiful cars') [dikʼolo'it͡sʼen̩t͡ɬʼɛ] → tse ntle di fihlile ('The beautiful ones [cars] have arrived') [t͡sʼen̩t͡ɬʼɛdifiɬile]

Adjectives:
- Common
- Colour

== Adjectives ==
Adjectives are qualificatives used with the adjectival concords.

In the Bantu languages, the adjectives form a closed class (with some languages having no proper adjectives at all). Sesotho has a rather large number of adjectives due to the included colour adjectives. It has about 50 adjectives which may be divided into two categories:

=== Common adjectives ===
Common adjectives are miscellaneous in nature and number about 20. The numbers 2 to 5 belong to this category.

'Example common adjectives
Stem	English meaning(s)
[bɪ] -be	'bad'
[hʊlʊ] -holo	'big'
[ŋ̍] -ng	'other'
[bedi] -bedi	'two'
[lelele] -lelele, [tʼelele] -telele	'tall', 'long'
[t͡sʰɪhɑdi] -tshehadi	'female'
[ɲɑnɪ] -nyane, [ɲɪɲɑnɪ] -nyenyane	'small', 'few'
[t͡ɬʼɛ] -tle	'beautiful'
[kʼɑ'ɪ] -kae?	'how much?'
[ŋɑtʼɑ] -ngata	'many'

Many of these adjectives are very ancient and exist in almost every Bantu language (sometimes as relatives).

=== Colour adjectives ===
Colour adjectives are a bit more numerous and indicate basic colours and animal colour patterns. These are responsible for the unusually large number of adjectives in Sesotho, since most other Bantu languages have the colours as relatives instead.

Example colour adjectives
Stem	English meaning(s)
[sʷe'u] -sweu	'white'
[fubedu] -fubedu, [xubedu] -kgubedu	'red'
[pʰifɑdi] -phifadi	'white with long black stripes'
[tʰʊkʼʷɑ] -thokwa	'fawn'
[tʼɑlɑ] -tala	'green/blue'
[sɔ'ɔtʰɔ] -sootho	'brown'
[ʀɔlɔ] -rolo	'black with white spots' (goats only)
[t͡sʼɛkʼɑ] -tseka	'with white spot on the forehead'
[t͡ʃʰɑbɑ] -tjhaba	'red and white'
[t͡sʰumu] -tshumu	'white faced'

Notes:

- The adjective -tala means "green/blue", while the relative -tala (pronounced exactly the same) means "unripe." The two meanings are related.
  [mʊkʼopʼuomʊtʼɑlɑ] mokopu o motala ('a green pumpkin'), [mʊkʼopʼuotʼɑlɑ] mokopu o tala ('a raw pumpkin')
- The s of the adjective [sɔ'ɔtʰɔ] -sootho and the r of the adjective -rolo are never nasalized with class 8, 9, and 10 nouns.
- Adjectives beginning with ⟨hl⟩ do not undergo nasalization either.
- [fubedu] -fubedu is nasalized irregularly to [xubedu] -kgubedu, though it is very common to hear just the nasalized form used with all nouns.
- The adjective -ng is not to be confused with the enumerative -ng ('one') which has a different tone. Like the enumerative, it is also irregular. It appears nasalised as [ŋ̍ŋʷɪ] -nngwe with class 9 (it is simply -ng for all other classes). Also, for the di- / di[N]- classes it uses the irregular (though normal in Setswana) concord tse di[N]- instead tse [N]-.
  dipodi tse ding ('some goats') [dipʼuˌdit͡sʼediŋ̍]
  dipodi tse ngata ('many goats'), [dipʼuˌdit͡sʼeŋɑtʼɑ] (Setswana dipodi tse dingata)

E.g.:

Borale bo bongata ('a large amount of [iron] ore') [bʊʀɑlɛbobʊŋɑtʼɑ]
Setshiro se sesehla ('a yellow mask') [siˌt͡sʰiʀɔsesɪt͡sʰɛɬɑ]
Letsoho le letona ('the right [lit. male] hand') [lɪt͡sʼɔhɔlelɪtʼʊnɑ]

== Relatives ==
Relatives are qualificatives used with the relative concords.

In the Bantu languages, the relatives form an open class and are the primary qualificatives used. Relative clauses are also used with the relative concords.

There are two types of relative stems:

1. Stems which seem to be radical in nature, and from which abstract nouns in class 14 may be formed.
2. Certain nouns unchanged in form.

Examples of both types follow below:

Example relatives
Type	Example	English meaning(s)
Radical	[ɬɑhɑ] -hlaha	'wild'
Radical	[xɔpʼɔ] -kgopo	'wicked'
Radical	[tʰɑtʼɑ] -thata	'difficult'
Radical	[tʼɑlɑ] -tala	'unripe'
Radical	[bɑt͡sʼi] -batsi	'wide'
Nouns	[met͡sʼi] -metsi	'wet'/'water'
Nouns	[mʊlɪmɔ] -molemo	'worthwhile'/'worth'
Nouns	[sɪbɪtʼɪ] -sebete	'brave'/'liver'
Nouns	[bʊɬɑlɪ] -bohlale	'intelligent'/'intelligence'
Nouns	[buˌ'imɑ] -boima	'heavy'/'heaviness'

The relative -tala is not to be confused with the adjective -tala.

E.g.:

mawa a tjhatsi ('simple strategies') [mɑwɑɑt͡ʃʰɑt͡sʼi]
mokgahlelo o boholkwa ('an important phase') [mʊxɑɬɛlɔobʊɬɔkʼʷɑ]
malakabe a bohale ('fierce flames') [mɑlɑkʼɑbɛebʊhɑlɪ]

Verbs can be used in very short relative clauses, although these are not considered proper relative stems:

ho tsofala ('to become old') [hʊt͡sʊfɑlɑ] → monna ya tsofetseng ('an old man') [mʊn̩nɑjɑt͡sʼʊfet͡sʼɪŋ̍]

== Enumeratives ==
In the Bantu languages, enumeratives are a category of qualificatives generally having some significance of enumeration. They are distinguished from other qualificatives by the fact that they use the enumerative concord.

In many Bantu languages the first five numerals belong to this category, but in Sesotho only the numeral 1 is an enumerative (the second to fifth are adjectives).

Sesotho has three basic enumeratives, divided into two types ("weak" or "strong"):

The enumeratives
No.	Stem	Type	English meaning
1.	[ŋ̍] -ng [ _ ]	strong	'one'
1.	[ŋ̍] -ng [ ¯ ]	strong	'what kind?'
2.	[fɪ] -fe? [ ¯ ]	weak	'which?'
2.	[fɪŋ̍] -feng? [ ¯ ¯ ]	weak	'which?'
3.	[sɪlɪ] -sele [ ¯ _ ]	weak	'other'

The strong enumerative stems use the strong form of the enumerative concord, and the weak stems use the weak form.

The numeral -ng has a special form with class 9 nouns where it appears as -nngwe (thus the numeral). It is always preceded by one of two constructions:

- The participial copulative
  mooki a le mong ('one nurse') [mʊ'okʼiɑlɪmʊŋ̍]
  baoki ba le bang ('the nurses only') [bɑ'okʼibɑlɪbɑŋ̍]
- the relative
  mooki ya mong ('one nurse') [mʊ'okʼijɑmʊŋ̍]

This stem should not be confused with the adjective -ng ('some') which has a high tone and is used as a normal adjective:

mooki e mong ('some nurse') [mʊ'okʼiemʊŋ̍]

The other enumeratives are used regularly using the enumerative concord:

ke moreana mong? ('what type of medicine is this?') [kʼɪmʊʀɪ'ɑnɑmʊŋ̍]
ke moreana ofe? ('which medicine is this?') [kʼɪmʊʀɪ'ɑnɑʊfɪ]
ke moreana osele! ('it's the wrong medicine!') [kʼɪmʊʀɪ'ɑnɑʊsɪlɪ]

-fe may also be used in a particular construction (repeated and with the conjunctive enclitic le-) to mean "any":

selemo sefe le sefe ('any year') [sɪlɪmɔsɪfɪlɪsɪfɪ]

Possessives:
- Direct
- With nouns
- Descriptive

== Possessives ==
Possessives are qualificatives used with the possessive concords.

=== The direct possessive ===
The direct possessive occurs when the concord agrees with the possessee, while the stem indicates the possessor.

Pronominal possessive stems agree with the possessee. Sesotho has these only for the singulars of the first and second persons and class 1(a) (third person) nouns; the other nouns and persons used the full absolute pronouns to indicate possession.

Possessive pronominal stems
Person	Stem
1st. person singular	[kʼɑ] -ka
2nd. person singular	[hɑ'ʊ] -hao
3rd. person and class 1 nouns	[hɑ'ɛ] -hae

E.g.:

sefahleho sa ka ('my face') [sɪfɑɬɛhɔsɑkʼɑ]
sefahleho sa yona ('its face' [class 9]) [sɪfɑɬɛhɔsɑjɔnɑ]

[ɪsʊ] -eso ('of my people'), [ɪnʊ] -eno ('of your people'), and [bɔ] -bo ('of his/her people') indicate collective possession. The vowels in the stems coalesce with the vowel in the possessive concord, changing the vowel quality:

[diŋ̍kʼut͡sʼenʊ] dinku tseno ('your sheep')

Prefixing [hɑ] ha- to these stems gives [hesʊ] -heso ('of my family/community'), [henʊ] -heno ('of your family/community'), and [hɑbɔ] -habo ('of his/her family/community'). Coalescence occurs again:

[diŋ̍kʼut͡sʼɑhenʊ] dinku tsa heno ('your family's sheep')

=== The possessive concord with nouns ===
The possessive concord with nouns is used to directly indicate the possessor. The construction is possessee, concord + possessor. The concord may also be used with demonstrative and qualificative pronouns.

E.g.:

leihlo la ngwana ('the child's eye') [liˌ'iɬɔlɑŋʷɑnɑ]
ho rata ha ntate ('my father's love') [hʊʀɑtɑhɑn̩tʼɑtʼe]
mongolo wa bana ('the handwriting of these' class 2[a]') [mʊŋɔlɔwɑbɑnɑ]

=== The descriptive possessive ===
The descriptive possessive occurs when the concord agrees with the possessor of some descriptive quality, which cannot be prononomial. In this case the possessor, being a noun, is used to describe the possessee.

This happens less commonly in Sesotho than in many other Bantu languages (the relative use being preferred instead), but there are still numerous instances of its use:

thipa ya tshepe ('an iron knife') [tʰipʼɑjɑt͡sʰɪpʼɪ]
mokotla wa poone ('a sack of mealies') [mʊkʼot͡ɬʼɑwɑpʼo'onɪ]
monna wa sefofu ('a blind man [lit. "man of a blind person"]') [mʊn̩nɑwɑsɪfofu]
selemo sa bone ('the fourth year') [sɪlɪmɔsɑbʊnɛ]

== Cardinals ==
Bantu languages tend to use a quinary counting system with six basic numbers, the other four being miscellaneous.

Here is a comparison between the first ten cardinals in some Bantu languages:

Numerals in several Bantu languages
No.	Sesotho	Tswana	Swahili	Zulu	Ganda
1.	[ŋ̍ŋʷɪ] nngwe	'ngwe	moja	ukunye	emu
2.	[pʼedi] pedi	pedi	mbili	isibili	bbiri
3.	[tʰɑʀʊ] tharo	tharo	tatu	kuthathu	ssatu
4.	[n̩nɛ] nne	nne	nne	okune	nnya
5.	[ɬɑnʊ] hlano	tlhano	tano	isihlanu	ttaano
6.	[t͡sʰɪlɛlɑ] tshelela	thataro	sita	isithupa	mukaaga
7.	[supʼɑ] supa	supa	saba	isikhombisa	musanvu
8.	[ʀobedi] robedi	robedi	nane	isishiyagalombili	munaana
9.	[ʀobʊŋ̍] robong	robong	tisa	isishiyagalokunye	mwenda
10.	[lɪʃʊmɛ] leshome	shome	kumi	ishume	kumi

Notes:

- The six basic numbers are 1 to 5, and 10.
- As in many Bantu languages, numbers 2 to 5 are adjectives (in many others they are enumeratives); the number 10 is a relative. In Sesotho, all the other numbers are relatives derived from verbs indicating gestures (e.g. 7 is derived from "to point").
- The above are the cardinal (counting) forms, derived from the adjectival forms (for 2 to 5); in particular, the forms in the Sotho–Tswana languages are nasally permuted.
- In Sesotho, nngwe is a variant (allomorph) of the adjective stem -ng used only for Class 9 nouns. The use of the number "one" in Sesotho is different from the other Sotho–Tswana languages, because the Sesotho -ng is an irregular enumerative which behaves sometimes like an adjective and can therefore become a noun.

== Verbs ==
Copulatives:
- Forming
- Ho-
- Conjugation

== Copulatives ==
A copulative is a word which does the work of a predicative, and which is formed from some other part of speech by modification of a prefix or concord, or by means of some formative addition.

Complete predicates and sentences may be formed with substantives, qualificatives, or adverbs without employing any verbs, according to definite rules. These copulatives generally take the place of the verb "to be" in English. In Sesotho, there are also conjugations of the copulative using verbs ([bɑ] -ba, [lɪ] -le, and [nɑ] -na, as well as their inflected forms) giving meanings of "to become" and "to have."

=== Forming the copulative ===
There are six basic rules, used in differing situations to form the most basic copulatives. The first two rules do not use any verbs (the zero copula) using only changes in tone and/or the copulative formative [kʼɪ] ke-. The other rules employ the irregular verb [lɪ] -le.

The rules may be classed into 3 categories (plain predication or zero copula, participial, past relative clause participial) and each category may be further divided into 2 groups (all persons with qualificatives and adverbs and 1st. and 2nd. persons substantives, versus 3rd. person substantives). Each rule further has its own unique negative.

The copulative in plain predication
Type	All qual. & adv., 1st. & 2nd. subst.		3rd. subst.	
Plain	Rule 1		Rule 2	
Plain	+	SC + CB	+	[kʼɪ] ke + CB
Plain	–	[hɑ] ha + SC + CB	–	[hɑsɪ] hase + CB
Participial	Rule 3		Rule 4	
Participial	+	SC + [lɪ] le and CB	+	[ɪ] e + [lɪ] le and CB
Participial	–	SC + [sɪ] se and CB	–	[ɪ] e + [sɪ] se and CB
Relative	Rule 5		Rule 6	
Relative	+	RC + [lɪ] le + [ŋ̍] ng and CB	+	DE and [ɪ] e + [lɪ] le + [ŋ̍] ng and CB
Relative	–	RC + [sɪ] se + [ŋ̍] ng and CB	–	DE and [ɪ] e + [sɪ] se + [ŋ̍] ng and CB

SC indicates the subjectival concord, CB is the copulative base, RC is the relative concord, and DE is the demonstrative element. This is one instance where the relative concords for the 1st. and 2nd. persons may be used.

Note that the participial sub-mood is the basis for all relative clause constructions (used in rules 3 to 6).

- Rule 1: To form copulatives from qualificatives and adverbs, with all persons and classes as subjects, and from substantives with 1st. and 2nd. person subjects, the subjectival concord is prefixed to the unchanged word or word-base. The prefix ha is used in the negative. It also has a definite tone pattern which avoids ambiguity with plain uses of qualificatives. In the case of adjectives, the subjectival concord takes the place of the "relative" part of the adjectival concord (that is, with the exception of the di[N]- classes, the adjective assumes the class prefix of the noun). Note that there is no downstep between the two words and that high toned subjectival concords cause any following noun prefix to be raised to a high tone (due to High Tone Doubling, see Sesotho tonology).
  dinku tseo di ntle ('those sheep are fine') [diŋ̍kʼut͡sʼe'ʊdin̩t͡ɬʼɛ]
  batho bao ba baholo [ _ _ ¯ ¯ ¯ _ ] ('those people are large') [bɑtʰʊbɑ'ʊbɑbɑhʊlʊ]
  Contrast the last example with [bɑtʰʊbɑbɑhʊlʊ] batho ba baholo [ _ _ !¯ _ ¯ _ ] ('the large people'), where the relative concord has an irregular extra-high tone and does not raise the second low tone ba, and there is a downstep between the two words which is not heard in the copulative.
  In the case of relatives, the subjectival concord takes the place of the relative concord and the relative stem functions as the copulative.
  mangau a hlaha ('cheetahs are wild')[mɑŋɑ'uɑɬɑhɑ]
  batho ba botswa [ _ _ ¯ _ ¯ ] ('the people are lazy')[bɑtʰʊbɑbʊt͡sʼʷɑ]
  Contrast the last example with [bɑtʰʊbɑbʊt͡sʼʷɑ] batho ba botswa [ _ _ !¯ _ ¯ ] ('the lazy people'), with a downstep and extra-high tone on the relative concord.
  With the enumerative ng ('one') the subjectival concord is prefixed to the enumerative with the enumerative concord. The other enumeratives are not used in this way.
  sefate se seng ('the tree is one') [sɪfɑtʼɛsɪsɪŋ̍]
  With (mainly locative) adverbs the subjectival concord is simply prefixed to the adverb.
  re hae ('we are home') [ʀɪhɑ'ɛ]
  The first and second persons are only used with substantival bases in using this rule.
  ke motho ('I am a person')[kʼɪmʊtʰʊ]
  re bona ('we are them')[ʀɪbɔnɑ]
  The negative of all these formations may be formed by simply prefixing the low toned ha-. This is exactly the same way that the negatives of most verbs in most tenses and moods are formed. Additionally, just as with verb negatives, the subjectival concord for class 1 nouns becomes a-, and all subjectival concords are high toned (not just third persons and noun classes). Note that the subjectival concord does not affect the tones of the base as in the positive.
  phahlo tsa ka ha di metsi ('my clothes are not wet') [pʰɑɬɔt͡sʼɑkʼɑhɑdimet͡sʼi]
  o molemo [ ¯ ¯ _ _ ] ('she is worthwhile')[ʊmʊlɪmɔ]
  ha a molemo [ _ ¯ _ _ _ ] ('she is not worthwhile') [hɑ'ɑmʊlɪmɔ]
- Rule 2: To form copulatives from substantives with a third person or noun class noun, the high toned prefix [kʼɪ] ke- is used in the positive and [hɑsɪ] hase- in the negative. This [sɪ] -se- should not be confused with the verb [sɪ] -se (used in the negatives of rules 3 to 6).
  monna enwa ke tona-kgolo ('this man is the minister') [mʊn̩nɑenʷɑkʼɪtʼʊnɑxʊlʊ]
  ntlo eo hase ya ka ('that house is not mine' [qualificative pronoun]) [n̩t͡ɬʼʊe'ʊhɑsɪjɑkʼɑ]
  ke bano ('there they are') [kʼɪbɑnʊ]
  ke motho [ ¯ _ _ ] ('he/she/it is a person') [kʼɪmʊtʰʊ]
  Contrast the last example with ke motho [ _ _ _ ] ('I am a person').
- Rule 3: To form participials of copulatives of qualificatives and adverbs with all persons and classes as subject, and from substantives with 1st. and 2nd. person subjects, the subjectival concord is prefixed to the verb -le preceding the copulative base. The negative uses the irregular negative -se of the verb.
  leha re le basebetsi ('although we are labourers') [lɪhɑʀɪlɪbɑsebet͡sʼi]
  ha ba le molemo ('if they are worthwhile' [class 2]) [hɑbɑlɪmʊlɪmɔ]
  ha di se ntle ('if they are not good' [class 8 or 10]) [hɑdisɪn̩t͡ɬʼɛ]
  This is the usual way of using the enumerative -ng ('one').
  leha selemo se le seng ('although the year is one')[lɪhɑsɪlɪmɔsɪlɪsɪŋ̍]
- Rule 4: To form participials of copulatives from substantives with a 3rd. person or noun class subject, the indefinite concord e- is prefixed to the verb -le. The negative uses the irregular negative -se of the verb.
  ha e le moetapela ('if she is the leader')[hɑɪlɪmʊ'ɛtʼɑpʼɪlɪ]
  leha e se ngwana'ka ('although she is not my child')[lɪhɑɪsɪŋʷɑnɑkʼɑ]
- Rule 5: To form relative clauses in present time of copulatives falling under rule 3, employ the direct relative concord and suffix -ng to -le (-se in the negative).
  [n̩nɑkʼɪlɪŋ̍mʊtʰʊ] Nna ke leng motho I who is a person
  [dixomʊdilɪŋ̍nɑheŋ̍] Dikgomo di leng naheng The cattle which are in the veld
- Rule 6: To form relative clauses in present time of copulatives falling under rule 4, employ the indirect relative construction with a demonstrative element followed by the subjectival indicator [ɪ] e-, preceding the verb [lɪ] -le ([sɪ] -se in the negative), with the relative suffix [ŋ̍] -ng.
  batho bao e leng baruta-bana ('people who are teachers')[bɑtʰʊbɑ'ʊɪlɪŋ̍bɑʀutʼɑbɑnɑ]
  batho bao e seng makgoba ('people who are not slaves')[bɑtʰʊbɑ'ʊɪsɪŋ̍mɑxɔbɑ]

=== The indefinite concord ho- ===
Indefinite copulative construction is achieved by using the class 17 concord ho- prefixed to the subject. Except with adverbs of manner, this always gives a locative implication to the construction.

ho monna ka tlung ('there is a man in the house') [hʊmʊn̩nɑkʼɑt͡ɬʼuŋ̍]
ha ho monna ka tlung ('There isn't a man in the house') [hɑhʊmʊn̩nɑkʼɑt͡ɬʼuŋ̍]

A more common form in the positive uses [hʊnɑlɪ] ho na le- instead of ho-. The negative of this is ha ho na

ho na le dijo ka mokotleng ('there is food in the bag') [hʊnɑ liˌdiʒɔkʼɑmʊkʼot͡ɬʼeŋ̍]
ha ho na dikgomo tse ngata ('there are not a lot of cattle' [lit. there are not cattle which are a lot]) [hɑhʊnɑdixomʊt͡sʼeŋɑtʼɑ]

=== Conjugation ===
Just like verbal conjugation, the conjugation possibilities of copulatives are varied and complex, with most tenses needing deficient verbs and/or infixed verbal auxiliaries. What follows is only a brief overview of some points.

There is a two-way division between direct and associative forms of the conjugation. The direct forms generally mean "to become" while the associative forms mean "to have."

In the direct form the verb -ba is commonly employed. This verb is inceptive and (when used as a transitive verb) means "become" (not "is", which is indicated by the direct non-verbal copulative).

Thus there are two main aspects of the direct copulative conjugation, the inceptive and the stative. In the former -ba appears; in most multi-verbal tenses of the latter the verb -le is used, though not all tenses may conjugate in this aspect. In all there are about than 35 basic tenses in the direct inceptive, and 13 in the stative.

e bile sebini selemo se fetileng ('he became a professional singer last year') [iˌbilesiˌbinisɪlɪmɔsefiˌtʼileŋ̍]
e ne e se mohatsa wa hae ('she was not his spouse') [ɪneɪsɪmʊhɑt͡sʼɑwɑhɑ'ɛ]

The associative form of the copulative conjugation generally signifies "to have" (lit. 'to be with'). It too shares a division between inceptive and stative aspects, the former using -ba with the conjunction le- (conjunctive import), and the latter using -na with le- (in the positive; the negative has no le-). This conjunctive le-, which is a prefix attached to the verb's object, is not to be confused with the copulative verb -le. In all there are about 30 basic tenses in the inceptive and 10 in the stative.

ke tla ba le ngwana ('I shall have a child') [kʼɪt͡ɬʼɑbɑlɪŋʷɑnɑ]
re tla be re na le bopaki ('we shall [at some specific time] have evidence') [ʀɪt͡ɬʼɑbeʀɪnɑlɪbʊpʼɑkʼi]. Note the Group I deficient verb -be used with the infix -tla- to show the continuous future positive tense, with an implication of the time being known.

A few more examples follow.

ke tla be ke sa be le kgotso ('I will [at that time] not have any peace') [kʼɪt͡ɬʼɑbekʼɪsɑbɪlɪxɔt͡sʼɔ]. Stative inceptive indicative future negative.
ha o a ka wa ba moholo ha kana ('it class 3 has never ever been as big as this') [hɑ'ʊ'ɑkʼɑwɑbɑmʊhʊlʊhɑkʼɑnɑ]. Direct inceptive subjunctive past negative.
[kgwedi] e se e le Tshitwe ('it [the month] is now December') [ɪseɪlɪt͡sʰitʼʷe]. Direct stative exclusive positive.

Adverbs:
- Of place
- Of time
- Of manner
- Interrogative

== Adverbs ==
Adverbs are words which describe qualificatives, predicatives, or other adverbs with respect to time, place, or manner.

As in many other Bantu languages, there is a close relationship in Sesotho between adverbs and nouns, with many adverbs appearing as normal nouns and locatives of nouns being used as adverbs. However, the function of an adverb is always clearly distinct from that of a noun.

Though adverbs are obviously usually used with a predicative, there are some cases where the predicative does not appear and the adverb may be assumed to be describing a covert copulative.

Batho Pele ('people first') [bɑtʰʊ pʼɪlɪ]. The full form may be assumed to be [kʼɪ bɑtʰʊ pʼɪlɪ] Ke Batho Pele ('it is the people first')

=== Adverbs of place ===
Generally all adverbs of place are "locatives", which are inflected nouns and pronouns. These are formed by certain rules of inflexion listed below. They generally indicate the place at, on, in, into, from etc. which the action takes place. When used with nouns indicating time they may denote time rather than place.

The actual meaning of a locative is determined by the verb used or the context.

ba ya thabeng ('they go to the mountain') [bɑjɑtʰɑbeŋ̍]
ba tswa thabeng ('they come from the mountain') [bɑt͡sʼʷɑtʰɑbeŋ̍]
ba dutse thabeng ('they are sitting on the mountain') [bɑdut͡sʼɪtʰɑbeŋ̍]

The locative merely indicates the place brought into relationship with the verb, thus the many prepositions used in English are completely unnecessary in the Sesotho language.

These are the rules for forming the locative from nouns:

- Most nouns except those of class 1a suffix a low tone -ng. This suffix comes from original Proto-Bantu *-nî which results in vowel raising
  lerako ('stone wall') [lɪʀɑkʼɔ] → lerakong [lɪʀɑkʼoŋ̍]
- Non-class 1a nouns ending with a replace it with -eng. [mʊɬɑ] Mohla ('day') is an exception with [mʊɬɑŋ̍] mohlang, though its plural has a regular locative with [mɪɬeŋ̍] mehleng
  thaba ('mountain') [tʰɑbɑ] → thabeng [tʰɑbeŋ̍]
- Non-class 1a nouns ending with the syllabic nasal suffix -ng as usual, resulting in two consecutive syllabic nasals [ŋ̍ŋ̍] nng
  [mɑnoŋ̍] manong ('vultures') → [mɑnoŋ̍ŋ̍] manonng
- Class 1a nouns assume the high tone prefix ho-.
  [xɑ'it͡sʼedi] kgaitsedi ('opposite-sex sibling') → [hʊxɑ'it͡sʼedi] ho kgaitsedi
- Nouns indicating persons (except those in class 1a) may use either the prefix or the suffix
  [sɪt͡ɬʼʊhʊlʊ] setloholo ('grandchild') → [sɪt͡ɬʼʊhʊlʊŋ̍ŋ̍] setloholong, [hʊsɪt͡ɬʼʊhʊlʊ] ho setloholo
- Many nouns, such as place names and nouns indicating times are used without any modification
  [lɪɬɑbulɑ] lehlabula ('summer')

While ho- is used to mean "at", its possessive form ha- is used to indicate "at the place of"

[kʼɪt͡sʼʷɑhɑʀɑŋʷɑnɪ] ke tswa ha rangwane ('I come from my younger uncle's place')

Locatives may be formed from pronouns (except the quantitative) by prefixing ho- and its possessive form ha-

ba tswa ho wane motse ('they come from that town') [bɑt͡sʼʷɑhʊwɑnɪmʊt͡sʼɪ]

Furthermore, there are class 16, 17, and 18 nouns, certain forms with the prefix ko- (an irregular unchanged Proto-Bantu class 17 prefix *ku-, possibly from the Serolong dialect of Setswana), and some other nouns, all used uninflected as locative adverbs.

The adverbs indicating "here," "there," and "yonder" are simply class 18 demonstrative pronouns, using class 18 concords (instead of the more usual class 15 concords used by the three locative classes). The relative concord used to form these words does not seem to be weakened (it appears as mo- instead of the o- used with class 3).

The locative demonstratives
Here		There		Yonder	
1st. form	2nd. form	1st. form	2nd. form	1st. form	2nd. form
[mo'ʊ] moo	[monɑ] mona	[mo'ʊ] moo	[monʊ] mono	[molɑ] mola	[mɑnɪ] mane

=== Adverbs of time ===
Apart from certain locative formations with a temporal implication, many nouns and seemingly radical adverbs may be used as adverbs of time.

kgale ('a long time ago') [xɑlɛ]
bosiu ('night, at night') [buˌsi'u]
mantsibuya ('afternoon') [mɑn̩t͡sʼibujɑ]
mohla ('day') [mʊɬɑ] ([mɪɬɑjɑmɑdimʊ] Mehla ea Malimo [in Lesotho orthography] 'in the Days of Cannibals' is a landmark historical tale written in 1911 by Edouard Motsamai about Difaqane)
kgitla ('midnight') [xit͡ɬʼɑ]

Some use the high tone prefix ka- to form adverbs of time. These nouns include days of the week and months of the year. Certain other nouns which accept the suffix -ng may also take this prefix instead.

[pʰupʼu] Phupu ('July') → [kʼɑpʰupʼu] ka Phupu ('in July')
[lɑbʊnɛ] Labone ('Thursday') → [kʼɑlɑbʊnɛ] ka Labone ('on Thursday')

=== Adverbs of manner ===
Some adverbs of manner are radical in formation; others are miscellaneous formations from nouns. There are also several ways of forming adverbs of time from other parts of speech by using affixes ha-, the conjunctive le-, ka-, jwale ka- (which is a complete word followed by a prefix), the copulative ke-, etc.).

-ng ('one') [ŋ̍] → hang ('once') [hɑŋ̍] (also hang hang [hɑŋ̍ hɑŋ̍] 'post-haste')
-ngata ('many') [ŋɑtʼɑ] → hangata ('often') [hɑŋɑtʼɑ]
mmoho ('together') [m̩mɔhɔ]
tjena ('thus') [t͡ʃʼenɑ]
ke mohlotse ka bohlale ('I defeated him with [my] genius') [kʼɪmʊɬʊt͡sʼɪkʼɑbʊɬɑlɪ]
ka boomo ('on purpose') [kʼɑbo'omʊ]
ke shwele ke tlala! ('I am dead from hunger!') [kʼɪʃʷɪlɛkʼɪt͡ɬʼɑlɑ]

Additionally, in slightly non-standard speech, absolute pronouns may be inflected to form adverbs meaning "on X's own" by prefixing the instrumental ka- and the class 14 noun prefix bo- to the pronoun.

seo o se entseng ka bowena ('that which you did on your own') [se'ʊʊsɪ'en̩t͡sʼeŋ̍kʼɑbʊwɛnɑ]

=== The interrogative ===
The high tone adverb na may be used to mark or emphasise questions. It, and its variant forms, may appear before, after, or both before and after the complete sentence.

na o buile le yena? ('did you speak to her?') [nɑuˌbu'ilelɪjɛnɑ]

== Ideophones ==
An ideophone is a word, often onomatopoeic in nature, which describes the qualities of a predicative, qualificative, or adverb.

In the Bantu languages ideophones form a distinct part of speech, which resembles to a certain extent the adverb in function, but unlike which it may (in some languages) be used as a predicate. In Sesotho there are two ways of using ideophones; one involves the use of the verb ho re ("verbum dicendi") which in this case means "to express" instead of the usual "to say." The other way involves simply placing the ideophone after a verb or qualificative with the aim of intensifying its meaning.

Often when using ideophones in speech, the speaker may accompany the utterance with an action (indeed, with the ideophone mpf "of being finished completely" the action — running ones index finger very close in front of the lips — is necessary to pronounce the word properly).

[hʊʀɪfi] ho re fi! ('to suddenly become dark'), [lɑbɔnɛlɑtʼimɑfi] lebone la tima fi! ('the light suddenly went out')
[hʊʀɪtʼʷɑ] ho re twa! ('to be very white"0, [dipʰɑɬɔdit͡sʰʷe'utʼʷɑ] diphahlo di tshweu twa! ('the clothes are very white')
[hʊʀɪpʼududu] ho re pududu ('to be gray or dirty'), [ʊmuˌpʼut͡sʼʷɑpʼududu] o mo putswa pududu ('his is rather gray [from dirt or from not applying moisturiser after bathing]')

The verb -re when used with ideophones may take a direct object (indicated by an objectival concord). It is this verb which carries all forms of inflexion on behalf of the ideophone. Its mood, transitivity, tense, objects, aspect, etc. are all reflected in the verb -re, while the ideophone itself does not in any way change.

[hʊmʊʀɪmu] ho mo re mu! ('to hit him over the head with a walking stick')
[ɪneɪʀɪtʼɛpʼɛ] e ne e re tepe! ('it was wet')
[ɑʀɪfuɲɑfɛɬɛ] ...a re funyafehle! ('...while he was completely drunk')

This illustrates that the ideophone itself is neither transitive nor intransitive, etc., and they are usually translated to English with the construction "of...."

[tʼo] to! ('of being alone')

Many Sesotho ideophones are radicals, and many of them are shared by many Bantu languages (such as Sesotho tu! and isiZulu du! / dwi! 'of silence'), though many are formed from other parts of speech. Indeed, it is common for a speaker to intensify the meaning of a descriptive word or verb by improvising ideophones and placing them after the word, or by simply leaving the listener to surmise the meaning from the context or accompanying action. Ideophones are often created from verbs by simply replacing the final vowel -a of the basic verb with a high toned -i.

[ɑ'ɪt͡sʰʷɑʀɑt͡sʰʷɑʀi] a e tshawara tshwari!, [ɑ'ɪʀɪt͡sʰʷɑʀi] a e re tshwari! ('he grabbed it') accompanied by the action of reaching out and quickly grasping an invisible object.
[ɑmʊʀɪxʊm] a mo re kgom! ('and he grabbed him by his shirt') accompanied by the speaker performing the action on himself.

Ideophones, being very emotional in nature, tend to not follow the phonetic rules of the language and may be pronounced in peculiar ways. For example, the stress may fall on the last or first syllable of all ideophones regardless of length, vowels may be indefinitely lengthened (po... of being cold), syllabic r may be heard ([t͡ʃʼɛʀ̩] therr 'of frying'), syllables may have codas ([tʰetʰeŋtʰeŋ] thethengtheng 'of performing with a stop'), prenasalized consonants may occur ([xɑmpʼɛpʼɛ] kgampepe 'of running'), vowels may be devocalised ([pʰʊ̥] phu 'of smelling bad'), and various consonants not found in core Sesotho may be used ([viː] vi... 'of a thrown projectile travelling through the air in a hyperbolic path'). There is even a case of three syllabic nasals with contrasting tones pronounced with three separated air breaths (not as a very long nasal with an undulating tone) [ŋ̍ŋ̍ŋ̍] nnng [ _ ¯ _ ] ('of refusing outright').

Conjunctives:
- Forms
- Functions

== Conjunctives ==
Conjunctives introduce or join up sentences.

Sesotho conjunctives may be studied from two aspects: form and function.

There are four forms of conjunctives:

1. Primitive conjunctives, which we may call conjunctions,
2. Other parts of speech unchanged in form but used as conjunctives,
3. Inflected forms of conjunctives and other parts of speech, and
4. Compounds.

There are four functions of conjunctives:

1. Non-influencing conjunctives which don't affect the grammatical mood of the succeeding predicate,
2. Conjunctives which govern the indicative mood,
3. Conjunctives which govern the subjunctive mood, and
4. Conjunctives which govern the participial sub-mood.

=== Forms ===
- Conjunctions are very rare, and many may have originated from simpler forms.
  [hɑ] ha ('if/when')
  [m̩mɪ] mme ('and')
  [xɑn̩tʰɪ] kganthe ('whereas')
- Other parts of speech unchanged including nouns, pronouns, adverbs, and deficient verbs (used with the indefinite concord e-) may be used as conjunctives.
  ho re ('to say') [hʊʀɪ] → hore ('such that') [hʊʀɪ] (pronounced with different tones)
  hola ('that over there' class 15 demonstrative pronoun) [holɑ] → hoja ('if only') [hoʒɑ] (note the irregular palatalization)
  fela ('only' [adverb]) [fɛlɑ] → fela ('however') [fɛlɑ] (pronounced with an irregular stressed final syllable, distinctly from the adverb)
  -mpa (deficient verb implying 'may as well just') [m̩pʼɑ] → empa ('but') [ɪm̩pʼɑ]
- Inflected forms of conjunctives and other parts of speech may be used as conjunctives. This may be done with certain words through the use of a handful of prefixes and suffixes.
  [hɑ] ha ('if') → [lɪhɑ] leha ('even if')
  [ho'ʊ] hoo (class 15 demonstrative pronoun) → [kɑho'ʊ] kahoo ('therefore')
  [ɪm̩pʼɑ] empa ('but') → [ɪm̩pʼɑnɪŋ̍] empaneng ('but')
- Compounds may also be used as conjunctives.
  [mʊɬɑomʊŋ̍] mohla o mong ('some day') → [mʊɬomʊŋ̍] mohlomong ('perhaps')

=== Functions ===
- Non-influencing conjunctives do not affect the mood of the following predicate. They are co-ordinating and merely form compound sentences.
  [hɑ'ɑn̩t͡sʼɪbɪ] ha a ntsebe ('he does not know me' indicative mood) → [kʼɪ'ɑmʊt͡sʼɪbɑɪm̩pʼɑhɑ'ɑn̩t͡sʼɪbɪ] ke a mo tseba empa ha a ntsebe ('I know him but he does not know me')
  [kʼɪt͡ɬʼʊhɛlɛhʊ'ʊbʊt͡sʼɑ] ke tlohele ho o botsa? ('should I stop asking you?' subjunctive mood) → [ʊt͡ɬʼɑn̩tʰusɑkʼɑmʊsebet͡sʼionɑkʼɑpʼɑkʼɪt͡ɬʼʊhɛlɛ hʊ'ʊbʊt͡sʼɑ] o tla nthusa ka mosebetsi ona kapa ke tlohele ho o botsa? ('will you help me with this work or should I stop asking you?')
- Conjunctives which govern the indicative mood are followed by clauses in the indicative mood.
  [uˌ'it͡sʼeʊ'ɑmʊt͡sʼɪbɑxɑn̩tʰɪʊneɑʀɪtʰet͡sʼɑ] o itse o a mo tseba kganthe o ne a re thetsa ('he said he knew him and yet he was lying to us')
  [ʊ'ɑbɔnɑhʊʀɪpʼulɑɪ'ɑnɑ] o a bona hore pula e a na ('you can see that it's raining'; this hore is pronounced with tone pattern [ _ _ ])
- Conjunctives which govern the subjunctive mood are followed by (subordinate) clauses in the subjunctive mood.
  [lɪɬɔkʼɑhʊpʼʊt͡ɬʼɑkʼɑhʊʀɪliˌfiɬekʼɑnɑkʼɔ] le hloka ho potlaka hore le fihle ka nako ('you need to hurry up in order that you may arrive on time'; this hore is pronounced with tone pattern [ _ ¯ ])
- Conjunctives which govern the participial sub-mood are followed by clauses in the participial sub-mood. Note that some of these conjunctives are followed by a pure participial form, while others are followed by a relative construction (since all relative clauses in Sesotho are in the participial sub-mood).
  [lɪkʼɑ'ɪǃɛtʼɑhɑliˌ'ikʼemisedit͡sʼe] le ka e qeta ha le ikemiseditse ('you can finish it if you are prepared')
  [bɑbɑbulet͡sʼɪlɪhɑbɑnebɑsebɑkʼʷet͡sʼɪ] ba ba buletse leha ba ne ba se ba kwetse ('they opened for them although they had already closed')
  [ʊbon̩t͡sʰit͡sʼeɑsɑtʰɑbɑkɑmo'ʊɑneŋ̍ɑbu'ɑkʼɑtʼeŋ̍] o bontshitse a sa thaba kamoo a neng a bua kateng ('he showed that he was sad from the way in which he was speaking')

Interjectives:
- Interjections
- Vocatives
- Imperatives

== Interjectives ==
Interjectives are isolated words or groups of words of an exclamatory nature, used to express emotion, or for the purpose of calling attention, giving commands, or conveying assent or dissent. They may themselves also constitute complete sentences, without the use of predicates.

In the Bantu languages interjectives may be divided into three types:

1. Radical interjectives, or interjections,
2. Vocatives, and
3. Verb imperatives.

=== Interjections ===
Interjections have no grammatical or concordial bearing on the sentence; they are merely attached as appendages.

As with ideophones, their emotional nature causes some of them to be pronounced in peculiar ways, but these irregularities are not as great as those exhibited by ideophones.

dumelang! ('greetings!') [dumɛlɑŋ̍]
kgele! ('of astonishment') [xele]
nxa ('of contempt') [ǁ] (really just an isolated lateral click)
('of approval') [ɛhɛː] ehee
hela! ('of calling') [helɑ]
itjhu! ('of pain') [it͡ʃʰu]
tjhee ('of dissent') [t͡ʃʰɛː] (the vowel is long with a very irregular low rising tone)
e'e ('of dissent') [ɛʔɛ] (see hiatus)
e ('of assent') [eː] (the vowel has a high falling tone)
eish ('of being dumfounded') [eiʃ] (this is a common interjection among all language groups in the more cosmopolitan areas of South Africa)
tanki ('of thanks') [tʼɑŋ̍kʼi] (from Afrikaans "dankie")
askies ('sorry') (from Afrikaans "ekskuus")

=== Vocatives ===
Vocatives are formed in Sesotho from nouns and 2nd. person pronouns (since all proper vocatives are naturally addressed to "the second person").

No change in form takes form in the noun.

banna! ('oh my!') [bɑn̩nɑ] (only used by men)
wena! ('hey you!') [wɛnɑ]
mmao! ('your mother!') [m̩mɑ'ʊ] (used as an insult similar to Afrikaans jou ma!)

A suffix/clitic -towe and its plural equivalent -ting may be used to indicate an insult

molotsana towe! ('you wretched evil hag!') [mʊlot͡sʼɑnɑtʼʊwɛ]

The adverbial instrumental prefix ka- is used to form interjectives of oath

ka ntate ('by my father!') [kʼɑn̩tʼɑtʼe]

=== Imperatives ===
Imperatives have neither subjects nor subjectival concords. They are 2nd. person forms, and have the same force as other interjectives, but, being verbal, they may also take objects and assume extensions.

The rules for the formation of the singular imperative are as follows:

- Verbs with more than one syllable are used without any modification
  [mɑtʰɑ] matha ('run!')
- Most monosyllabic verbs may either suffix -a or prefix e-
  [t͡sʼʷɑ] -tswa ('exit') → [ɪt͡sʼʷɑ] etswa! / [t͡sʼʷɑ'ɑ] tswaa ('get out!')
- The verbs -re ('say'), -ya ('go'), and -ba only use the prefix
  [ʀɪ] -re ('say') → [ɪʀɪ] ere
- The imperative of the verb [t͡ɬʼɑ] -tla ('come') is [t͡ɬʼo'o] tloo

Sometimes an epenthetic h or y may be inserted between the two a's or o's for emphasis.

The negative may be formed in several ways:

- By prefixing se- to the basic verb and changing the final -a to -e
  [ʒɑ] -ja ('eat') → [ɪʒɑ] eja / [ʒɑ'ɑ] jaa ('eat!'), [sɪʒɪ] se je ('do not eat!')
- By using se- with the infix -ka- with no change in the verb's final vowel
  [kʼɛnɑ] -kena ('enter') → [sɪkʼɑkʼɛnɑ] se ka kena ('don't come in!')
- A commonly used negative, although technically not an interjective (as it contains a subjectival concord) is made by employing the (inflected) Group IV deficient verb -ke in the subjunctive mood (that is, with the "auxiliary concord" prefixed to the main verb). The above negative is most probably a contraction of this form (hence the final vowel was not changed due to the contracted concord)
  [bu'ɑ] bua ('speak') → [ʊsɪkʼewɑbu'ɑ] o se ke wa bua ('don't say a word!')

If the first person is included in the plural subjects, the hortative prefix ha- is used in the subjunctive mood. This is an example of the cohortative mood (a form of the subjunctive)

[hɑʀɪsɪkʼeʀɑjɑ] ha re se ke ra ya ('let us rather not go')

Again in the subjunctive mood, an object may be specified in all of the above forms by an objectival concord. This is in the subjunctive mood, and so the final vowel of the verb changes to e (in the positive) e (in the negative) when the deficient verb -ke is not used

[ʒʷet͡sʼɑ] -jwetsa ('tell') → [bɑʒʷet͡sʼɛ] ba jwetse ('tell them!'), [lɪsɪkʼelɑbɑʒʷet͡sʼɑ] le se ke la ba jwetsa ('you [pl.] should not tell them!'), [hɑʀɪbɑʒʷet͡sʼɛ] ha re ba jwetse ('let's tell them!')

Except for forms employing subjectival concords, the plural is formed by adding the suffix -ng to the verb (or the deficient verb -ke when it is used). This -ng may regularly result in vowel raising if the verb ends with the open vowel e

[sɪmɑtʰɪŋ̍] se matheng ('you [pl] must not run!')

When subjunctive tenses are used "imperatively" they are not interjectives since they have subjectival concords (and have more typical verbal tonal patterns), but note that in this case there is a distinction between singular, dual, and plural number in the 1st. person. In this case dual number is marked by the hortative prefix ha- and 1st. plural subjectival concord, and plural is marked by the prefix, the concord, and the suffix -ng to the verb (or the deficient verb -ke if it is used).

[mɑtʰɑ] matha! ('run!') singular 2nd. person)
[hɑʀɪmɑtʰɛ] ha re mathe! ('let [the two of] us run!') dual 1st. person
[hɑʀɪmɑtʰɛ] ha re matheng! ('let us [more than two] run!') plural 1st. person
[hɑʀɪsɪkʼeŋ̍ʀɑmɑtʰɑ] ha re se keng ra matha ('let us [more than two] not run!' plural 1st. person negative

All imperatives addressed to the 2nd. person (even if that person is included in a 1st. person plural) may be strengthened by using the enclitic -bo. This formative leaves the stress in place, thus resulting in words with stress on the antepenultimate syllable.

[mɑtʰɑbo] matha bo! ('run I say!')
