= Sotho verbs =

Sesotho verbs are words in the language that signify the action or state of a substantive, and are brought into agreement with it using the subjectival concord. This definition excludes imperatives and infinitives, which are respectively interjectives and class 14 nouns.

In the Bantu languages, verbs often form the centre of a complex web of regular derivational patterns, and words/roots belonging to many parts of speech may be directly or indirectly derived from them. Not only may new verbs be derived using a large number of derivational suffixes, nouns (and, iteratively, the other parts of speech that derive from them), some imperative interjectives and, to a lesser extent, ideophones may be formed by simple morphological devices.

== Varieties ==
Verb stems may be divided into four varieties:

1. Regular stems beginning with a consonant and ending in a vowel
2. Monosyllabic verbs
3. Vowel verb stems begin with a vowel
4. Derived verbs constructed from other verbs, noun roots, adjectival roots, and ideophones by suffixes.

Regular verbs are those beginning with a consonant and ending in the vowel a. The final a may change into every vowel except the near-close back vowel (/ʊ/) through inflexion or derivation. The verb root is the atomic part of the verb, which does not change (save for some purely phonetic changes) and Bantu languages share numerous similar verb roots (with predictable sound changes between languages).

Stem -bona see, from root -bon-, also existing as isiZulu -bon-, Swahili -on-, Tshivenda -vhon-, Chishona -von-, Chilamba -won- etc. Proto-Bantu *-bon-

Monosyllabic stems may be classified into several categories:

- The i-stems have a typical i in derivatives, and u in the passive
  -tla come ⇒ Perfect -tlile, Causative -tlisa, Passive -tluwa
  -ya go ⇒ Perfect -ile, Causative -isa, Passive -uwa
  -kga draw water ⇒ Perfect -kgile, Causative -kgisa, Passive -kguwa
- The e-stems have a typical near-close front e in their derivatives
  -tjha burn ⇒ Perfect -tjhele, Causative -tjhesa, Passive -tjhewa
  -ja eat ⇒ Perfect -jele, Causative -jesa, Passive -jewa
- The "velar" e-stems have labialized onsets, and have similar forms to other e-stems but have a near-close back vowel o in the passive
  -nwa drink ⇒ Perfect -nwele, Causative -nwesa, Passive -nowa
- There are three defective stems, ending in a vowel other than a. The first two of these verbs are very common among the Bantu languages
  -re say ⇒ Perfect -itse, No causative, Passive -thwe
  -le be; very restricted in use (only used in the participial sub-mood of certain copulatives)
  -tjho say so ⇒ Perfect -tjhelo / -tjholo, No causative, No passive

Vowel verb stems are conjugated as regular verbs but are put into a separate class due to being uncommon in Bantu languages (and, in some languages but not in Sesotho, causing changes to concords and other formatives prefixed to them). Class 1 and 5 nouns derived from these verbs do not cause any velarization to the prefix. The Proto-Bantu reconstructions of many of these verbs suggests that they originally began with *g (or sometimes *j), which "protected" the vowel.

-ila avoid (as a taboo)
-eta travel
-utlwa hear, sense
-aha construct
-otla strike, punish

== Tones ==
Verbs fall into only two categories when it comes to their tones: L verbs and H verbs. The difference lies in whether the "underlying tone" of the verb's first syllable is high or null (under-specified). Thus, all verbs of a certain length in the same tonal category are pronounced with similar tonal patterns under the same grammatical circumstances.

What the verbal tone system lacks in variety, however, it more than makes up for in complexity. The tones of the syllables of the verbs regularly change under varying grammatical environments, with the high tones being manipulated by "tonal rules", and the tones associated with certain syllables being changed by numerous "tonal melodies."

== Verbal derivatives ==
Various derivatives may (recursively) be formed from verbs by means of several suffixes (called "extensions"). Each derived verb is as much an authentic verb as the original.

In the following sections, "polysyllabic" means "of more than two syllables."

Verbs are derived primarily through suffixes, some of which are no longer productive ("dead").

Verb derivations using the root -qet-
Type	Suffix	Valency change	Example	Meaning
Simple	-a	0	-qeta	finish
Passive	-wa	–1	-qetwa	be finished
Passive	-uwa	–1	-qetuwa	be finished
Neutro-active	-ahala	intr.	-qetahala	finishable
Neutro-passive	-eha	intr.	-qeteha	finishable
Applied	-ela	+1	-qetela	finished for
Causative	-isa	+1	-qetisa	cause to finish
Intensive	-isisa	0	-qetisisa	finish intensely
Perfective	-ella	0	-qetella	finish completely
Reciprocal	-ana	–1	-qetana	finish each other
Associative	-ahana	–1	-qetahana	(be finished together)
Reversive	-olla	0	-qetolla	unfinish
Augmentative	-olla	0	-qetolla	(finish extensively)
Extensive	-aka	0	-qetaka	(finish repeatedly and extensively)
Diminutive	(see text)	0	-qeta-qeta	finish a little
Positional (dead)	-ama	0	(-tsorama)	(squat)
Stative extensive (dead)	-ala	0	(-robala)	(sleep)
Contactive (dead)	-ara	0	(-fupara)	(clench the hand)

The passive indicates that the subject is acted upon by the agent, just like the "passive voice" in English. The agent is indicated by the copulative prefix ke- although passives may also be used idiomatically without an agent.

The suffix may be either -wa (Proto-Bantu *-u-) (short passive) or -uwa (long passive).

The following rules are applied to form the passive:

- The long passive is formed simply by changing the final -a to -uwa
  -bopa mould ⇒ -bopuwa be moulded
- Many verbs accept the short passive suffix by simply becoming labialized
  -etsa do ⇒ -etswa be done
- Palatalization occurs where necessary (when the final consonant is p, ph, b, or f)
  -hapa win ⇒ -hapjwa / -hatjwa be won
- Velarization occurs where necessary (when the final consonant is m or ny)
  -tsitsinya move slightly ⇒ -tsitsinngwa be moved slightly
- Monosyllabic e-stems suffix -ewa (except the velar e-stems ending in -wa, which suffix -owa) and i-stems suffix -uwa
  -fa give ⇒ -fuwa be given
- Verbs ending in -ya replace it with -uwa
  -hlwaya select, indicate ⇒ -hlwauwa be selected
- Verbs ending in -ua replace it with -uuwa
  -tsua judge, condemn ⇒ -tsuuwa be judged

It is very rare to have other verbs derived from the passive through suffixes.

This suffix has the effect of decreasing the valency of the verb and giving it an agentive import.

In the most formal standard language, the perfect of the passive is generally formed by inserting -ilw- before the final vowel of the perfect form (that is, the passive suffix has to come after the perfect suffix). In non-standard common speech, however, the perfect of the passive may alternatively be formed by using the long passive with the final vowel changed to the final vowel (usually -e) of the verb's perfect. Additionally, in non-standard speech the perfect passive of verbs ending in a -ma that changes to -ngwa in the passive replace it with -nngwe.

The passive is used more commonly in Sesotho than the English "passive voice." Consider the following example:

Sesotho (passive) Ntja e tla fepuwa ke mang?, English (active) "Who will feed the dog?"

The alternatives are more complex in their respective languages:

Sesotho (normal) Ke mang ya tla fepang ntja?, English (passive) "The dog will be fed by whom?"

Passive verbs are rare in the Niger–Congo family outside the Bantu sub-branch.

The neutro-active indicates an intransitive state without reference to the agent determining the condition. It can be approximated in English by using "get" or "become." It is, however, distinct from the passive. It indicates a current state of being done or being doable.

The suffix is -ahala. Only transitive verbs may take this suffix.

-phetha accomplish ⇒; -phethahala (currently) get finished, take place
-etsa do ⇒; -etsahala be done

This suffix has the effect of making the valency of the verb 0, even if the original verb had two objects. The resultant verb is completely intransitive and cannot assume any objects even if they are prefixed.

The perfect of verbs ending with this suffix is achieved by changing the final -ala to -etse.

This extension is quite rare in the Bantu language family as a whole.

The neutro-passive indicates an intransitive state without reference to the agent determining the condition. It can be approximated in English by the suffix "-able." It is, however, distinct from the passive. It indicates that the verb has the potential of being doable, but not necessarily currently.

The suffix is -eha (Proto-Bantu *-ik-, with an irregular vowel shift). Only transitive verbs may take this suffix.

-qhala disperse ⇒; -qhaleha be (potentially) spillable, become scattered
-etsa do ⇒; -etseha be doable, become done

This suffix has the effect of making the valency of the verb 0, even if the original verb had two objects. The resultant verb is completely intransitive and cannot assume any objects even if they are prefixed.

The past tense of verbs ending with this suffix is formed in the general way by replacing the final vowel with -ile.

The applied indicates an action applied on behalf of or with regard to some object. It can be approximated in English by prepositions and prepositional phrases such as "for" and "towards."

The suffix is -ela (Proto-Bantu *-id-, with an irregular vowel shift). Sometimes this extension is doubled to -ella, causing the verb to look like a perfective form but with an applied meaning.

The following rules apply when forming the applied:

- Usually one simply suffixes -ela
  -batla to search for ⇒ -batlela search on behalf of
- Verbs ending in -ya replace it with -ela
  -tsamaya walk ⇒ -tsamaela walk on behalf of, towards
- Verbs ending in -la preceded by an open vowel (/ɛ/, /ɑ/, or /ɔ/) elide the middle /ɛ/ and contract to -lla
  -ngola write ⇒ -ngolla write to/for
- Verbs ending in -la preceded by a closed vowel (/i/, /ɪ/, /ʊ/, or /u/) don't contract
  -hola grow ⇒ -holela grow for/towards
- Polysyllabic verbs ending in -sa, -tsa (most), -tswa, -ntsha, and -nya cause the -la to alveolarize to -tsa
  -etsa do ⇒ -etsetsa do for
- Polysyllabic causative verbs ending in -tsa replace it with -letsa, reversing an original alveolarization

-sebetsa work ⇒; -sebeletsa work for

The applied increases the valency of verbs; intransitive verbs may become transitive in the applied, and transitive verbs may become doubly transitive

-phela live ⇒; -phelela live for
-bolela say something ⇒; -bolella tell someone something (two objects)

The past tense of verbs ending with this suffix changes the -ela to -etse.

The causative indicates an action caused to happen by some agent. It can be approximated in English by using "cause to."

The suffix is -isa (Proto-Bantu long causative *-îc- + short causative *-î- ⇒ *-îcî-).

The following rules apply when forming the causative. Most complications are caused by the original Proto-Bantu "short causative" *-î- being absorbed into the preceding consonant (Sesotho does not allow palatal glides):

- Usually one simply suffixes -isa
  -etsa do ⇒ -etsisa cause to do
- Verbs ending in -ya replace it with -isa
  -tsamaya walk ⇒ -tsamaisa cause to walk
- Some verbs ending in a -tsa, which is an alveolarization of an original -la, revert the alveolarization, ending in -disa
  -sebetsa work ⇒ -sebedisa use
- Monosyllabic e-stems suffix -esa and i-stems suffix -isa
  -nwa drink ⇒ -nwesa cause to drink
- Verbs ending in -nya and disyllabic verbs ending in -na contract and cause nasalization resulting in -ntsha
  -bona see ⇒ -bontsha show
- The original Proto-Bantu short causative suffix causes some verbs ending in -la and -na to change to -tsa and -nya respectively (in common non-standard speech all verbs ending in -na are changed to -ntsha)
  -kopana meet ⇒ -kopanya join
- Most verbs ending in -oha and -uha change the -ha to -sa. This is also due to the Proto-Bantu short causative (Proto-Bantu *-k- + short causative *-î- + final *-a ⇒ *-kîa, which appears as Sesotho -sa)
  -aloha go to graze ⇒ -alosa herd

Often the causative verb has a meaning implying "help to do"

-aha build ⇒; -ahisa help to build ⇒; -ahisana help each other to build ⇒; moahisane neighbour (since traditionally neighbouring houses would share a wall and yard, which the owners would build together)

The causative may increase the valency of verbs

-tseba know something ⇒; -tsebisa cause someone to know something

Usually the perfect is formed by further suffixing -itse, but if the derivation alveolarized an original final -la to -tsa then the alveolarization is reversed, resulting in final -ditse. If the suffix changed final -na to -nya then the perfect is formed by replacing this final syllable with -ntse.

The intensive indicates intensity or quickness of action.

The suffix is simply a doubling of the causative suffix (-isisa) and the first syllable therefore follows similar phonetic rules as the causative. Sometimes, the suffix -isa is used instead, resulting in causative and intensive verbs looking the same.

-batla look for ⇒; -batlisisa investigate, search thoroughly
-etsa do ⇒; -etsisisa do intensely

The perfective indicates an action that has been carried out to completion or perfection.

The suffix is simply a doubling of the applied suffix (-ella). It must therefore not be confused with the applied form of verbs ending in -ela.

-hata step on ⇒; -hatella oppress, coerce
-etsa do ⇒; -etsella do thoroughly

A further intensification of meaning is achieved with the suffixes -eletsa (-ella + Proto-Bantu *-îa) and -elletsa (-ellela + Proto-Bantu *-îa), a compounding of intensive and perfective suffixes. These verbs tend to denote meanings indicating specific purpose, and it is not unlikely that they are in fact intensifications of the applied suffix -ela instead (though the verb's valency is not increased).

-hoa shout ⇒; -hoeletsa call out, scream
-tshira obscure, screen ⇒; -tshireletsa protect

Though one might expect this suffix to form the perfect by replacing the -ella with -eletse, it often appears as -elletse instead, even in standard speech.

The reciprocal denotes a reciprocated action.

It is formed by suffixing -ana (Proto-Bantu *-an-).

It is usually used with plural subjects and plural concords, and has the effect of decreasing the valency. However, an object (the second subject) as well as a singular subject may still be used if the object is prefixed with the conjunctive enclitic le- (and, with); that is, they have a conjunctive import

-bua speak ⇒; -buisa cause to speak ⇒; ba a buisana they communicate, ke buisana le yena I communicate with him
-etsa do ⇒; -etsana do (to) each another

Often this suffix is used when there is no chance that two subjects are involved in reciprocating the action. In this case it simply converts the verb from transitive to conjunctive import, with a minor modification of meaning (the action is slightly extended in time, or indicates a habit of the actor)

-sheba look at, search for ⇒; ke a di sheba / ke shebana le tsona I am looking for them (class 8 or 10 object)

The perfect is usually formed by changing the final vowel to -e, though if the original verb was monosyllabic then the perfect replaces the -na with -nne

The associative indicates that two or more subjects are associated together in the action of the verb.

It is formed by suffixing -ahana.

This derivative formation is not regularly used with most verbs.

-hoka attach, hook ⇒; -hokahana be attached to each other, telecommunicate with one another
-etsa do ⇒; (-etsahana (be done together)

The perfect simply replaces the final vowel with -e

The reversive (or inversive) indicates an entire reversal of an action.

It is formed by suffixing -olla (Proto-Bantu *-udud-) although several other dead formations exist, showing two sets of derivations into intransitive, transitive, and causative. These extensions, or at least their short forms as found in other languages (Proto-Bantu intransitive *-uk- and transitive *-ud-), are sometimes called the "separative" instead.

Dead reversive forms
Type	Intransitive	Transitive	Causative
Short	-oha	-ola	-osa
Full	-oloha	-olla	-olosa

-etsa do ⇒; -etsolla undo

Though the theory (and standard grammar) would dictate that this suffix forms its perfect by changing to -olotse, it often appears as -ollotse instead, even in standard speech.

The augmentative is a largely dead formation signifying an augmentation or extension of a verb.

It is indicated by suffixes similar to the dead full formation of the reversive (-oloha, -olla, and -olosa).

-kgetha set apart ⇒; -kgetholoha be distinct

The extensive indicates performing the action repeatedly or extensively.

It is formed with the suffix -aka but is limited in scope. It is primarily used with verbs signify discrete actions, causing them to be continuous or habitual. It is also sometimes heard doubled as -akaka, with the same meaning.

-qhoma jump ⇒; -qhomaka prance about
-etsa do ⇒; -etsaka do repeatedly

The perfect of this extension simply suffixes -ile.

The diminutive indicates an action done "a little."

It is indicated by reduplication, the form being determined by the length of the verb:

- Disyllabic verbs repeat the entire stem
  -etsa do ⇒ -etsa-etsa do slightly
- Monosyllabic verbs are repeated with the near-close front vowel (/ɪ/) between the stems. This form is almost never used
  -ja eat ⇒ -ja-e-ja eat a little
- Polysyllabic verbs duplicate the first two syllables of the stem
  -fumana find ⇒ -fuma-fumana find somewhat

Note that this derivation pattern, like all other uses of reduplication in Bantu languages, is also sometimes used to indicate an intensification and/or repetition of an action—in these cases the actual meaning must be determined from context.

After the reduplication, the new verb may only have an underlying high tone on the first syllable (that is, only the phones of the first syllable are repeated, but not its tone).

The positional is a dead stative formation found in many verbs, mostly indicating bodily positions.

It is marked by the suffix -ama (Proto-Bantu *-am-). Originally, this suffix was not used to derive new meanings as such, but rather to emphasise the stative positional nature of the verb.

The perfect of these verbs changes the -ama to -ame and indicates a continuous, current action instead of a completed one. Past tense may be indicated by multi-verbal conjugation.

-paqama lie face downwards ⇒; O paqame He is lying face down, O ile a paqama He did assume a lying position, O ne a paqame He was lying

The stative extensive is a dead stative formation found in a few miscellaneous verbs, united by the fact that they all indicate states.

It is marked by the suffix -ala (Proto-Bantu *-ad-). Originally, this suffix was not used to derive new meanings as such, but rather to emphasise the stative nature of the verb.

The perfect of these verbs changes the -ala to -etse and indicates a continuous, current action instead of a completed one. Past tense may be indicated by multi-verbal conjugation.

-makala wonder ⇒; Ba maketse They are in awe, Ba ile ba makala They did become amazed, Ba ne ba maketse They were amazed

The contactive is a dead formation found in a few verbs, all indicating touch or contact of some sort.

It is marked by the suffix -ara (Proto-Bantu *-at-). Originally, this suffix was not used to derive new meanings as such, but rather to emphasise or intensify the contactive nature of the verb.

The perfect of these verbs changes the -ara to -ere and indicates a continuous, current action instead of a completed one. Past tense may be indicated by multi-verbal conjugation.

-apara wear ⇒; Re apere We are clothed, Re ile ra apara We did become dressed, Re ne re apere We were dressed

=== Compounding of extensions ===
A verb may assume more than one extension, giving it a correspondingly more complex meaning.

-sheba watch X ⇒; causative -shebisa cause Y to watch X ⇒; causative-applied -shebisetsa cause Y to watch X on behalf of Z ⇒; causative-applied-reciprocal -shebisetsana cause Y to watch X on behalf of each other

Though it may appear that the possibilities are endless, the truth is that the depth is limited by various factors. Apart from the obvious constraints of semantics (whether a complex meaning actually makes any sense and serves any possible purpose) and markedness (how strange and complex the verb sounds to the native speaker), there are also restrictions on the order of the extensions.

If an extension increases the valency of a verb, any objects of the original verb are demoted and the new object is made principal.

ke sheba masimo I watch the fields ⇒; ke shebisa bana masimo I cause the children to watch the fields ⇒; ke shebisetsa nkgono bana masimo I cause the children to watch the fields on behalf of the old woman (highly marked)

If an objectival concord is used instead of an object, the concord agrees with what would have been the principal object. Additionally, if the original object was also only indicated by an objectival concord, then it becomes demoted to an absolute pronoun (Sesotho verbs may only have one objectival concord).

ke a a sheba I watch them (masimo fields) ⇒; ke ba shebisisa ona I cause them (bana children) to watch them (masimo) ⇒; ke mo shebisisetsa bona ona I cause them (bana) to watch them (masimo) on behalf of her (nkgono grandmother, old woman) (highly marked)

(Note how the infix -a- disappears when the verb is followed by a direct object, even if it is not the object indicated by the concord.)

Like all other Bantu languages, Sesotho has inherited certain restrictions on the order of the extensions. The most basic rule (which is broken by very few languages) is that the passive and the short causative always follow all the other extensions (including the perfect -il-, which is always used with the final vowel -e). Although it is probable that Proto-Bantu had fairly strict restrictions on the order of the other extensions, these rules have been relaxed somewhat in modern Bantu languages.

For example, since the causative -is- is normally ordered closer to the verb stem than the reciprocal -an- (or indeed, most other extensions), to form the causative of the reciprocal the (dead) short causative (Proto-Bantu *-î-) is usually used instead, therefore palatalizing the reciprocal to -ny-. Various other unexpected palatalizations and alveolarizations brought on by combinations of the causative with other extensions may be similarly explained by the action of the short causative either replacing the normal causative, or being used together with the long causative around another extension (causative + other extension ⇒ -is- + other extension + *-î- ⇒ -is- + modified extension).

Certain extensions (intensive, perfective, associative, reversive, and augmentative) are obviously fossilised compound extensions. Often a derived verb may continue being used while the original verb disappears from the language.

Note that, since prefixes are of the shape CV or V (where C represents a consonant and V a vowel), verb roots end without the final vowel, prefixes are of the shape (VC)* (* indicates possible repetition) and the final vowel simply has shape V, this and other structures reinforce the open syllable structure of the Bantu languages, and very few languages have broken it.

== Non-verbal derivatives ==
Verbs may also, to a lesser degree, be derived from nouns, qualificatives, and ideophones.

Denominative verbs are stative verbs derived from nouns and qualificatives.

They are formed by suffixing -fa (dead) or -fala to the stem, giving a verb meaning "become...."

bohlale intelligence ⇒; -hlalefa become intelligent
bonolo soft (relative) ⇒; -nolofala become soft

The monosyllabic adjectival roots (except -ng some, and -ne four) become nasalized before assuming the suffix. Furthermore, the vowel of -tle (beautiful) changes to -tla:

-be ugly ⇒; -mpefala become ugly
-tjha new ⇒; -ntjhafala become renewed
-tle beautiful ⇒; -ntlafala become beautiful
-tsho black ⇒; -ntshofala become black

Causatives are formed regularly by changing the -fala suffix to -fatsa. Perfects are formed regularly by changing the -fala suffix to -fetse.

This extension (the long -fala) is quite rare in the Bantu languages, though all languages have a few verbs in this form even if it may no longer be active.

Deideophonic verbs are formed rather irregularly from disyllabic ideophones.

They are miscellaneous in nature and are formed by the addition of several suffixes such as -ha, -la, -tsa, -sa, -ma, -tseha, -bala, -ka etc.

However, common across the Bantu language group are the forms -ha for the intransitive, -la for the transitive, and -tsa for the causative. Additionally, the causative of the intransitive may be formed regularly with the suffix -sa, but this is usually not done if the causative -tsa form is regularly used.

phetho of turning over ⇒; -phethoha flip over, experience a car accident
tswete of being completely full ⇒; -tsweteha burst open
thakgo of picking up and throwing forward ⇒; -thakgoha (of large herbivores) stand up and move in a certain direction, and -thakgola initiate a process or plan

When forming these verbs, the tone of the first syllable of the verb (its characteristic tone) corresponds to the tone of the first syllable of the part of the original word used to form the verb (usually the root, but a complete noun for monosyllabic roots). Thus verbs derived regularly from monosyllabic stems are all L verbs (due to the null toned prefix).

bobebo easy, easyness [ _ _ ¯ ] ⇒; -bebofala become easy (L verb)
bohale angry, anger [ _ ¯ _ ] ⇒; -halefa become angry (H verb)
matla strong, strength [ _ _ ] ⇒; -matlafala become strong (L verb)

== Inflexion during conjugation ==
In addition to the verbal derivatives, the following changes may occur to the stem's suffix -a, during conjugation:

- The -a changes to -e ([ɪ]) to form the perfect subjunctive tense and certain tenses of the negative conjugation. This vowel always causes the syllable carrying it to assume a high tone.
- The -a changes to -e ([ɛ]) to form the present-future tense of the subjunctive mood.
- The -a becomes -ang to form the plural of the imperative and certain relative tenses.
- The -a becomes -ile to form the perfect stem. Various phonological situations may change this basic construct.

The general rules for the formation of the perfect are varied due to various mostly phonological interactions with the suffix:

- Generally, -ile is suffixed
  -reka buy ⇒ -rekile bought
- Verbs ending in -ya replace it with -ile
  -tsamaya go ⇒ -tsamaile went
- For monosyllabic stems, i-stems suffix -ile and e-stems suffix -ele
  -nwa drink ⇒ -nwele drank
- Disyllabic verbs ending in -ma change it to -mme
  -roma send ⇒ -romme sent
- Polysyllabic verbs ending in -sa, -tsa (most), -tswa, and -ntsha cause the -ile to alveolarise to -itse
  -hlatswa wash ⇒ -hlatswitse washed
- Verbs ending in -na of more than one syllable and disyllabic reciprocal verbs change the -na to -nne
  -bina sing ⇒ -binne sang
  and so forth...

For all verbs, however, the past tense may also be indicated with the simple -ile (past subjunctive) multi-verbal conjugation, although its meaning does diverge somewhat from that of the perfect (especially with stative verbs)

Ba ile ba bina They did sing

== Conjugation ==
Verbal conjugation is by far the most complex and varied topic in the Bantu languages. The tenses are conjugated by means of prefixes and infixes indicating person, mood, implication, and aspect.

There are two conjugations, the positive and negative, and most tenses have corresponding forms in each. The language recognises four moods: the indicative, the subjunctive, the potential, and the participial sub-mood (infinitives are nouns and imperatives are interjectives). The moods may be divided into tenses according to time (remote past, immediate past, present, immediate future, and remote future) and implication (simple, progressive, and exclusive), which may be further subdivided according to aspect into indefinite, continuous, and perfect.

There are also many often complex compound tenses, indicated by changes in tone and the use of deficient verbs (multi-verbal conjugations).

Import refers to how the object of the verb is indicated.

Verbs can be either:

- Intransitive, with no direct object
  Ke a thola I become quiet
- Transitive, with a single direct object
  Ke a o leboha I thank you
- Ditransitive, with two objects
  Ke fa ngwaneso mofaho I give my sibling food for the journey
- Locative, with a locative adverbial construction often indicated by -ng / -eng
  Ke kena lapeng I enter my home
- Agentive verbs (usually passives), which need a copulative used as an agent adverb indicated by ke-
  Ba thuswa ke bukantswe They are helped by the dictionary
- Instrumental verbs, which use an instrumental adverb indicated by ka-
  Re eta ka koloi We travel by car
- Conjunctive verbs (mostly reciprocals), which use the conjunctive proclitic le-
  Re dumellana le bona We agree with them

Many verbs can have more than one import (-tsamaya (walk) can be locative, instrumental, or conjunctive; -bua (speak) can be intransitive, transitive, instrumental, or conjunctive) and verb derivatives can also change the import of the stem.

Many shades of meaning are achieved by the employment of deficient verbs in multi-verbal conjugations. Many tenses and moods may only be formed in this manner.

=== The verbal complex ===
In the Bantu languages, the typical full structure of verbs, excluding contractions, is as follows (the * indicates possible iteration):

PI — SC — NEG — TM — AM — OC — ROOT — EXT* — FV
│ │ │ │ │ │ │ │ │
│ │ │ │ │ │ │ │ final vowel
│ │ │ │ │ │ │ extensions
│ │ │ │ │ │ vb. root
│ │ │ │ │ objectival concord
│ │ │ │ aspect marker
│ │ │ tense marker
│ │ negative
│ subjectival concord
pre-initial morpheme

In Sesotho, as with most other Bantu languages, this has been modified somewhat, resulting in the following structure ("I shall no longer look on his behalf"):

Ha ke sa tla mo sheb el a
PI — SC — A1 — A2 — OC — ROOT — EXT* — FV
│ │ │ │ │ │ │ │
│ │ │ │ │ │ │ final vowel
│ │ │ │ │ │ extensions
│ │ │ │ │ vb. root
│ │ │ │ objectival concord
│ │ │ second verbal auxiliary
│ │ first verbal auxiliary
│ subjectival concord
pre-initial morpheme

Though indicative tenses form their negatives with the prefix ha-, many other moods and tenses form their negatives with an infix (either -sa- or -se-, depending on the specific tense). The verbal auxiliary infixes are used to indicate tense, certain forms of the subjunctive, progressive implication, the potential mood, as well verb focus in the present indicative tense. The verbal infixes always follow the simple infixes, though there are some instances where two simple infixes are used at the same time.

The extensions include suffixes used in verbal derivatives as well as the perfect -il- (which is always followed by the final vowel -e).

With the exception of the verb root, each of these formatives is monosyllabic, but in Sesotho some verbal infixes (those that are contractions) and extensions (those that are obvious compoundings of earlier forms) also have more than one syllable.

Additionally, the structure (obj conc. + stem) is often called the "macrostem" in various syntactical and tonal theories.

Many aspects and tenses are indicated by multi-verbal conjugations and, with the exception of the subjectival concord, the root, and the final vowel, most of these formatives are not always necessary. Note that infinitives and imperatives (both of which do not have subjectival concords) may be considered separate parts of speech (nouns/gerunds and interjectives). Deficient verbs are never used with objectival concords, and the use of the other formatives with them is also limited.

This structure obviously ignores any possible enclitics that is suffixed.

=== Tenses ===
The Sesotho tense system is somewhat less complex (though not necessarily less complicated) than that of other Bantu languages. Whereas many Bantu languages clearly divide the time into remote past, immediate past, present, immediate future, and remote future, not all Sesotho moods divide very clearly between immediate and remote tenses, and the differences in meaning are not as great.

Examples indicating the tenses (positive simple indicative mood)
Tense	Example
Present	Ke tseba nnete I know the truth
Past perfect	Ke tsebile nnete I knew the truth
Immediate past	Ke tswa tseba nnete I just recently knew the truth
Immediate future	Ke ilo tseba nnete I shall know the truth soon
Future	Ke tla tseba nnete I shall know the truth

=== Moods ===
There are basically four moods.

- The indicative mood indicates what is, was, or will be. It uses the basic subjectival concord.
- The potential mood indicates that an action is possible. It uses similar concords to those of the subjunctive.
- The participial sub-mood is so-called since it has forms corresponding to the tenses of both the above moods (most of the indicative, but only the present potential). It is widely used after certain conjunctives, in forming the complements of numerous multi-verbal tenses, and in the formation of relative clauses.
- The subjunctive mood is used in subordinate or consecutive constructions, in many cases being parallel in usage to the Latin subjunctive.

Examples indicating the moods (present tense)
Mood	Positive	Negative
Indicative	Ke tseba nnete I know the truth	Ha ke tsebe nnete I do not know the truth
Potential	Nka tseba nnete I may know the truth	Nke ke ka tseba nnete I may not know the truth
Participial	...ke tseba nnete ...while I know the truth	...ke sa tsebe nnete ...while I do not know the truth
Subjunctive	...ke tsebe nnete ...so I may know the truth	...ke se tsebe nnete ...so I may not know the truth

=== Implication ===
Within the indicative and participial moods, tenses may be further sub-divided according to the implication of the action.

- The simple implication indicates an action in no way qualified.
- The progressive implication indicates an ongoing action.
- The exclusive implication indicates an action that has not been happening until now.

Examples indicating implication (indicative mood)
Implication	Example
Simple	Ke tseba nnete I know the truth
Progressive	Ke sa tseba nnete I still know the truth
Exclusive	Ke se ke tseba nnete I now know the truth

=== Aspects ===
The tenses may be further divided according to the aspect of the action. In Sesotho there are at least three aspects, the definite, the continuous, and the perfect.

Examples indicating aspect (with a multi-verbal indicative past tense)
Aspect	Example
Definite	Ke ile ka tseba I did know
Continuous	Ke ne ke tseba I knew
Perfect	Ke ne ke tsebile I had known

== Deficient verbs ==
Deficient verbs, so called because they require a subordinate or complementary verb to complete their action, are used to form many tenses and to impart certain shades of meaning. They form part of multi-verbal conjugations consisting of a string of verbs, each with its own subjectival concord.

Deficient verbs, being "deficient", are never used alone. Many of them are irregular in form and have irregular inflexions. Monosyllabic deficient verbs are never used with the penultimate e- that is sometimes used with normal verbs (not to be confused with the indefinite concord).

Many of these verbs seem radical in nature, while others (especially those with complex implications) are obviously derived from certain extant normal verbs (but are used with slightly different meanings). What distinguishes the deficient usage of these normal verbs is the fact that they are followed directly by another verb and affect its meaning (and only the main verb may carry an objectival concord).

Ke se ke sa tsebe I no longer know
Ke ne ke tseba I knew
Ke tla be ke tseba I shall (at some specific time) know
Nka be ke ile ka tseba I should/would have known
Nka hla ka tseba I may indeed know
Ke tla mpe ke tsebe I will at least know
Nka nna ka tseba I may still know
Ka batla ke tseba I nearly knew
Nke ke ka hlola ke tseba I shall no longer know
Ke tshwanetse ho tseba I have to know
