= Sotho concords =

Just as the Sesotho sentence centres on the Sesotho noun, the noun is made to "concòrd" ("agree") with the verbs, pronouns, and qualificatives describing it by a set of Sesotho noun concords.

The noun concord system is the most striking feature of the Bantu language family. The exact number of concord types differs from language to language, and traces of this system (and the noun class system) are even found in some Niger–Congo languages outside the narrow Bantu branch.

== Concord types ==
There are seven basic sets of concords. Each noun class has concords in each set, and the first and second persons have unique concords in some of the sets (the third person uses the class 1 and 2 concords). The exact number of concords differs from language to language, but all Bantu languages have at least the subjectival and objectival concords.

In form, the concords closely resemble the class prefixes, and it is not unreasonable to assume that originally the other parts of speech were made to agree with the noun by simply prefixing them with the noun's class prefix. Today, in Sesotho, the vowels and consonants of the prefixes have been modified slightly in largely predictable ways.

In addition to these seven concords, there are two further immutable concord-like prefixes used in certain situations with verbs.

Sesotho is a pro-drop language in that in most situations separate words (such as absolute pronouns) do not need to be used with verbs to indicate the subject and object (they may be inferred from the subjectival and objectival concords).

Noun class concords
Class	Pronominal	Qualificative				Verb	
Class	Pronominal	Relative	Adjectival	Enumerative	Possessive	Subjectival	Objectival
First and second persons
(1st. pers. sg.)	N-	([kʼɪ] ke-)	–	–	–	[kʼɪ] ke-	-N-
(1st. pers. pl.)	[ʀʊ] ro-	([ʀɪ] re-)	–	–	–	[ʀɪ] re-	[ʀɪ] -re-
(2nd. pers. sg.)	[wɛ] we-	([ʊ] o-)	–	–	–	[ʊ] o-	[ʊ] -o-
(2nd. pers. pl.)	[lʊ] lo-	([lɪ] le-)	–	–	–	[lɪ] le-	[lɪ] -le-
Third persons and noun classes
Class 1(a).	[jɛ] ye-	[jɑ] ya-	[emʊ] e mo-	[mʊ] mo-, [ʊ] o-	[wɑ] wa-	[ʊ] o-	[mʊ] -mo-
Class 2(a).	[bɔ] bo-	[bɑ] ba-	[bɑbɑ] ba ba-	[bɑ] ba-	[bɑ] ba-	[bɑ] ba-	[bɑ] -ba-
Class 3.	[ɔ] o-	[o] o-	[omʊ] o mo-	[mʊ] mo-, [ʊ] o-	[wɑ] wa-	[ʊ] o-	[ʊ] -o-
Class 4.	[jɔ] yo-	[e] e-	[emɪ] e me-	[mɪ] me-, [ɪ] e-	[jɑ] ya-	[ɪ] e-	[ɪ] -e-
Class 5.	[lɔ] lo-	[le] le-	[lelɪ] le le-	[lɪ] le-	[lɑ] la-	[lɪ] le-	[lɪ] -le-
Class 6.	[ɔ] o-	[ɑ] a-	[ɑmɑ] a ma-	[mɑ] ma-, [ɑ] a-	[ɑ] a-	[ɑ] a-	[ɑ] -a-
Class 7.	[sɔ] so-	[se] se-	[sesɪ] se se-	[sɪ] se-	[sɑ] sa-	[sɪ] se-	[sɪ] -se-
Class 8.	[t͡sʼɔ] tso-	[t͡sʼe] tse-	[t͡sʼe] tse [N]-	[di] di-	[t͡sʼɑ] tsa-	[di] di-	[di] -di-
Class 9.	[jɔ] yo-	[e] e-	[e] e [N]-	[N]-, [ɪ] e-	[jɑ] ya-	[ɪ] e-	[ɪ] -e-
Class 10.	[t͡sʼɔ] tso-	[t͡sʼe] tse-	[t͡sʼe] tse [N]-	[di] di-	[t͡sʼɑ] tsa-	[di] di-	[di] -di-
Class 14.	[bɔ] bo-	[bo] bo-	[bobʊ] bo bo-	[bʊ] bo-	[bɑ] ba-	[bʊ] bo-	[bʊ] -bo-
Class 15, 16, 17, 18.	[hɔ] ho-	[ho] ho-	[hohʊ] ho ho-	[hʊ] ho-	[hɑ] ha-	[hʊ] ho-	[hʊ] -ho-

Immutable concord-like verb morphemes
Reflexive	Indefinite
[i] -i[N]-	[ɪ] e-

Notes on the tables:

1. [N] means that the nasal permutation will occur, with the syllabic nasal appearing only for monosyllabic stems. N means that the syllabic nasal will always appear.
2. "Class 1(a)" means class 1 and class 1a, while "class 2(a)" means class 2 and class 2a. Either group uses exactly the same concords, differing only in the class prefix and content.
3. All the locative classes (classes 16, 17, and 18) use the same concords, which resemble those of class 15.
4. When two forms of enumerative concords occur, the first one is the "strong" one, and the second is the "weak."

In the following discussion, weakening a prefix means removing the nasal consonant from a prefix, if it has one. This means more specifically that the m is removed from the class 1, 3, 4 and 6 prefixes, leaving only the vowel, and that class 9's prefix's nasal consonant is removed as well, although this per se would result in nothing at all; instead, class 9's prefix weakens to e-. In the examples, the noun is in bold, the concord is bold and underlined, and the word or clause which concords with the noun is underlined (nom. ... conc. + base).

The pronominal concords are used in the formation of the absolute pronouns.

In form they very roughly appear to be the weakened prefix followed by the open-mid back vowel o (except for class 1(a)). They all have a low tone.

Doke & Mofokeng, using evidence from Setswana, claim that in fact the pronominal concords are derived from the absolute pronouns.

[bɑtʼɑkʼibɑsebedisɑmɑt͡sʼɔhɔɑbɔnɑhʊɬɔlɑ] bataki ba sebedisa matsoho a bona ho hlola ('artists use their hands to create')

The relative concords are used to concord with relatives and relative clauses.

In form, for the noun classes, they appear to be the weakened prefixes coalesced with the close-mid front vowel /e/. This coalescence has the effect of moving the close and near-close front vowels /ɪ/ and /i/ to close-mid front /e/, moving the near-close back vowel /ʊ/ to the close-mid back /o/, and alveolarizing the consonant /d/ to /t͡sʼ/. The class 9 concord is e- and class 1(a) has an irregular concord ya- (which appears as a- in non-standard speech) suggesting an inherent close-mid front /ɪ/ vowel.

This is one instance of the high toneme appearing as the extra-high allotone without immediately following another high tone (see Sesotho tonology). Most other instances of seemingly tonemic extra-high tones are found in ideophones, which have a tendency of not following the phonological laws of the language.

The relative concords for the 1st. and 2nd. persons resemble the subjectival concords and are only rarely used, and only for relative clauses (never with relative stems). The 1st. and 2nd. persons usually use the class 1(a) and 2(a) concords instead.

[sɪpʰɪ'ɔsɑbɔnɑɪneɪlɪhʊʀɑlɑlɪ'ɑnɔlemʊlɪmɔ] sepheo sa bona e ne e le ho rala leano le molemo ('their goal was to design a worthwhile policy')
[kʼɪkʼʊpʼɑhʊʀɪbɑbɑt͡ɬʼɑŋ̩huˌ'iŋodiset͡sʼɑbɑm̩pʼʊlɛl̩lɛpʼɪlɪhʊlɑbʊɬɑnʊlenɑ] ke kopa hore [batho] ba batlang ho ingodisetsa ba mpolelle pele ho Labohlano lena ('would those [people] who wish to sign up please tell me before this Friday')

The adjectival concords are used with adjectival stems.

In form they appear to be the relative concords followed by the class prefix. Class 1(a) has an irregular concord [emʊ] e mo- (but it appears as [ɑmʊ] in non-standard speech). The di[N]- classes have an irregular concord tse [N]- instead of the expected *tse di[N]-, though this is their form in Setswana. The nasal permutation does not affect adjectives beginning with /ɬ/. The nasal permutation caused by the class 8 adjectival concord is probably due to false analogy with the class 10 forms (in isiXhosa, for example, the class 8 concord does not cause nasal permutation).

Being formed from the relative concord followed by the class prefix, they therefore have the tonal pattern [ ¯ _ ].

The first and second persons use the class 1(a) and 2(a) adjectival concords.

[mɑbɔnɛɑsiˌtʰutʰutʰusɑkʼɑɑmɑxubeduɑneɑsɑsebet͡sʼɪ] mabone a sethuthuthu sa ka a makgubedu a ne a sa sebetse ('y motorbike's red lights were not working')

The enumerative concords are used with the enumerative stems.

In form, the weak concords appear to simply be the weakened form of the prefix, while the strong concords are just the class prefixes. The weak concord for class 9 has the form e-.

They have a low/null tone.

[ʊm̩pʰileliˌbit͡sʼɔlɑɬɔhɔjɑlɪfɑpʰɑlɪsɪlɪ] o mphile lebitso la hloho ya lefapha lesele ('you gave me the name of the head of the wrong department')

The possessive concords are used with possessives.

In form they appear to be formed from the subjectival concord by addition of the vowel a with various regular phonological side effects.

They all have a high tone.

[kʼɪbonɪsɪt͡sʰʷɑn̩t͡sʰɔsɑhɑ'ɛmɑ'ʊbɑnɪ] ke bone setshwantsho sa hae maobane ('I saw her photograph yesterday')

The subjectival concords concord with the subject of a verb.
They are placed near the beginning of the verbal complex, before any possible infixes verbal auxiliaries and the objectival concord, but after any "pre-initial" morphemes. In a multi-verbal conjugation they appear before every deficient verb (with the exception of contractions) as well as the main verb. The subjectival concord is needed even if the subject is explicitly stated.

In form they appear to simply be the weakened prefix (class 9 [N] weakening to e-).

The forms given above are only for the positive indicative mood. In the negative indicative, the subjunctive, the potential and the participial moods class 1(a) becomes a-. In the potential mood (using the infix -ka- in the positive) the 1st. pers. sg. is N ([ŋ̩kʼɑ] nka- and [ŋ̩kʼekʼe] nke ke). In the past subjunctive an assimilated infix -a- affects all the concords, resulting in what is sometimes called the "auxiliary concord."

The past subjunctive "auxiliary concord"
Class	Auxiliary concord
First and second persons
(1st. pers. sg.)	[kʼɑ] ka-
(1st. pers. pl.)	[ʀɑ] ra-
(2nd. pers. sg.)	[wɑ] wa-
(2nd. pers. pl.)	[lɑ] la-
Third persons and noun classes
Class 1(a).	[ɑ] a-
Class 2(a).	[ɑ] ba-
Class 3.	[wɑ] wa-
Class 4.	[jɑ] ya-
Class 5.	[lɑ] la-
Class 6.	[ɑ] a-
Class 7.	[sɑ] sa-
Class 8.	[t͡sʼɑ] tsa-
Class 9.	[jɑ] ya-
Class 10.	[t͡sʼɑ] tsa-
Class 14.	[bɑ] ba-
Class 15, 16, 17, 18.	[hɑ] ha-

The positive indicative concords are low (or alternatively, null) toned, and those for the noun classes are high toned. In the past subjunctive all the concords are low toned.

[ŋ̩kʼɑsɪxonɪhʊ'uˌtʰusɑkʼɪnɑlɪwɑkʼɑmʊsebet͡sʼi] [Nna] nka se kgone ho o thusa ke na le wa ka mosebetsi ('[Me] I won't be able to help you while I have my own tasks')
[hɑɑ'ɑmʊxɑlɪmɑ] [Thabang] ha a a mo kgalema ('he [Thabang] did not reprimand him')
[n̩tʼɑtʼeditʼeduʊkʼʊpʼɑhuˌbu'ɑlɪwɛnɑhɔnɑʒʷɑle] Ntate Ditedu o kopa ho bua le wena hona jwale ('Mister Ditedu asks to speak to you right now')

The objectival concords concord with the object of a verb.

They are placed right next to the main verb stem. In a multi-verbal conjugation they are used only with the main verb. Usually they do not appear with a verb if the object is explicitly stated (unlike subjectival concords, which have to appear in every predicative), but they can be used with the object to emphasise it and the action, or if the object appears before the verb (which also emphasises it).

In form they resemble the subjectival concords, differing only in the 1st. pers. sg. and class 1(a). Before verb stems beginning with a b the mo- + b- combination contracts to mm- ([m̩m]) due to the middle vowel being elided.

If the following verb stem is of more than one syllable, they cause the following syllable (the stem's first syllable) to have a high tone and appear with a low tone. However, if the verb stem is only one syllable long then it is the concord itself which is pronounced with a high tone.

[kʼɪnekʼɪsekʼɪsɑdibɑbɑt͡ɬʼɪdikʼʊbɔt͡sʼe'ʊ] ke ne ke se ke sa di batle dikobo tseo ('I no longer wanted those blankets')
[kʼɪt͡ɬʼɑlɪ'elet͡sʼɑhʊʀɪlɪ'et͡sʼeŋ̩hɑkʼɪsɛkʼɪbʊʀɑʀʊl̩lʊt͡sʼɪbʊtʰɑtʼɑbonɑ] ke tla le eletsa [lona] hore le etseng ha ke se ke bo rarollotse bothata bona ('I shall advise you all [you all] on what to do when I have dealt with this issue')
[hɑʀɪsom̩mʊt͡sʼɪkʼɑkʼɑbɔjɑdit͡ʃʰɛlɛtʼɛ] ha re so mmotse [Mme Mma-Seremi] ka kabo ya ditjhelete ('we haven't yet asked her [Mrs. Seremi] about the budget') (verb [bʊt͡sʼɑ] -botsa 'ask')
[ʊɬɔkʼɑhʊn̩t͡ɬʰɔm̩pʰɑkʼɪlɪmʊlɑ'uˌdiwɑhɑ'ʊ] o hloka ho ntlhompha [nna] ke le molaodi wa hao ('you need to respect me [I] as your director') (verb [ɬom̩pʰɑ] -hlompha 'respect')

The reflexive prefix is used to form reflexive verbs. It is not a concord in that it does not agree with any noun prefix, but it exhibits concord-like behaviour.

It is simply the close vowel i with the additional effect of nasally permuting the verb to which it is attached. Thus its form is i[N]-.

In form and function it behaves like the objectival concord (therefore it cannot be used with the objectival concord), including the behaviour of raising the tone of the first syllable of the verb stem. However, unlike the objectival concord, it can also be used to form non-infinitive nouns from verbs.

[ʊt͡sʰʷɑnet͡sʼhuˌ'ilo'itʼɑtʼɛlɑjɔnɑ] o tshwanetse ho ilo itatela yona ('he is supposed to fetch it for himself'). The verb is [hʊlɑtʼɛlɑ] ho latela ('to fetch on behalf of')
[ɑʀɑbɛlɑ] -arabela ('answer on behalf of') → [huˌ'ikʼɑʀɑbɛlɑ] ho ikarabela ('to answer for oneself') → [buˌ'ikʼɑʀɑbɛlɔ] boikarabelo ('responsibility')

When used with causative verbs it often has the meaning of "pretend to be"

[ʃʷɑ] -shwa ('die') → [ʃʷɪsɑ] -shwesa ('cause to die'; never used directly) → huˌ'it͡ʃʰʷɪsɑ ho itjhwesa ('to feign death'; lit. to cause oneself to die)
[ʀɔbɑlɑ] -robala ('sleep') → [ʀɔbɑt͡sʼɑ] -robatsa ('cause to sleep') → huˌ'itʰɔbɑt͡sʼɑ ho ithobatsa ('to pretend to be asleep'; lit. to cause oneself to sleep)

The indefinite concord is used in certain copulative constructions.

It only exists as a subjectival concord and appears in form to be the subjectival (and "auxiliary") concord of class 9.

The indefinite concord
Subjectival	Auxiliary
[ɪ] e-	[jɑ] ya-

It is only used as the subjectival concord for 3rd. persons and noun classes in the "direct tense" of the copulative employing the verbs [bɑ] -ba, [lɪ] -le, and [sɪ] -se (including multi-verbal conjugations), when the copulative base is a noun or pronoun.

[kʼɑnɑkʼɔe'ʊmʊn̩nɑenʷɑɪneɪseɪlɪlɪkʼʷɑlɑ] ka nako eo, monna enwa e ne e se e le lekwala ('by that time, this man was already a coward') not *...o ne a se a le lekwala
[kʼɑnɑkʼɔe'ʊmʊn̩nɑenʷɑʊneɑseɑlɪbo'i] ka nako eo, monna enwa o ne a se a le boi ('by that time, this man was already afraid') not *...e ne e se e le boi
