= Afentse Fenny Lekolwane =

Motswana film producer (born 1981)

- Born: April 17, 1981 (age 44)
- Citizenship: Botswana
- Occupations: Film Producer, Writer, and Director
- Years active: 2003–present
- Organization: Botswood
- Spouse: Lawrence Lekolwane

Afentse Fenny Lekolwane (born 17 April 1981) is a Motswana film producer, writer, and director who has been active in Botswana’s film and television industry since 2003. She is one of the early contributors to the country’s film industry, having produced Flat 101, a 13-episode television drama that premiered on Africa Magic, marking her debut as the first Motswana to produce a TV drama broadcast on M-Net which aired in 2004. She co-founded Botswood, a film production company with her husband, cinematographer Lawrence Lekolwane.

== Early life ==
Lekolwane’s interest in storytelling began at a young age and was shaped by African oral traditions. She was inspired by her grandmother, who regularly told stories around the fire, often combining narration with elements of singing, acting, and performance. Through observing these storytelling practices, Lekolwane developed an early understanding of story structure, character, and audience engagement, which sparked her imagination and love for narrative art.

Rather than formal training at the time, her early learning came through observation and lived experience, rooted in African modes of storytelling. She later chose to pursue formal education in film and earned a Bachelor of Arts degree in Motion Picture Medium, majoring in Writing and Directing, from AFDA in 2021. In more recent years, she has begun attending selected workshops to further develop her craft.

== Career ==
Afentse Fenny Lekolwane began her filmmaking career in 2003 when she premiered her first television drama titled Flat 101, which was the first Botswana-produced series to air on a DSTV platform in 2004. In 2025 she collaborated with MultiChoice where she produced Route 2. film which aired on Mzansi Magic.

Since 2003 she has produced more than 20 titles across film, television series, documentaries, and magazine shows, contributing to the development of Botswana’s film industry.

Her work includes Nazara, her graduation film, which won the Gold Award for Best Film and was later selected for screening at a European film festival in 2023. She also served as head writer for Botshelo Jo, Botswana’s longest-running television series, writing 156 episodes.

Lekolwane is a member of the Writers Guild of South Africa and has appeared on several platforms representing Botswana’s film industry.

== Awards and recognition ==
In June 2025, Afentse Fenny Lekolwane was one of six filmmakers who pitched her wildlife film concept titled Sacred Nuisance, at the Wildscreen Festival in Maun. She won the Best Motswana Led Pitch award, receiving £3,000 and a year of production and legal support from Botswana Ignite.

While studying at AFDA, Lekolwane was awarded a Gold Award for Best Film for her Herero language student film titled Nazara at the school’s graduation showcase in 2021.

In 2016, Lekolwane was named among the Top 50 Botswana Change Makers in the media category, which was a recognition that highlighted her contributions to the country’s creative and film sectors.

== Filmography ==
- FLAT 101 (2004)
- Definitions TV Drama (2005)
- Dolly and Friends kiddies show (2006)
- Shaya ma get down show (2008)
- Ya le nna Nigeria (2010)
- Matsale Comedy (2010)
- The Dancing Gods of the Kalahari Documentary (2012)
- Botshelo Jo Season 1 (2012)
- Mpho le Mphonyana (2014)
- Lepodisi la Sephiri (2014)
- Pelo e ja serati (2015)
- Boi’s Helping hand Magazine show (2015)
- Beauty Comedy (2006, 2016)
- The President’s daughter film (2018)
- Soul Ties (2019)
- Un-Settled (2020)
- The Genocide (2021)
- Nazara (2021)
- Within Our Boarders (2021)
- Botshelo Jo season 2 (2021)
- Botshelo Jo season 3
- Route 2 (2025)
