= Modise =

Modise is an African name that may refer to

Given name

- Modise Mokwadi Fly (died 2010), Botswana politician and activist

Surname

- Billy Modise (1940–2016), south African politician
- Clive Moyo-Modise (born 1984), British footballer
- Frederick Samuel Modise (1914–1998), South African church leader
- Glayton Modise (1940–2016), leader of the International Pentecostal Holiness Church
- Joe Modise (1929–2001), South African political figure
- Karabo Modise (born 1988), Botswana cricketer
- Portia Modise (born 1983), South African footballer
- Teko Modise (born 1982), South African football midfielder
- Thandi Modise (born 1959), South African politician
- Tim Modise, South African journalist, broadcaster, public speaker and philanthropist
