= Tswana people =

Ethnic group in Southern Africa

Botswana people
Batswana
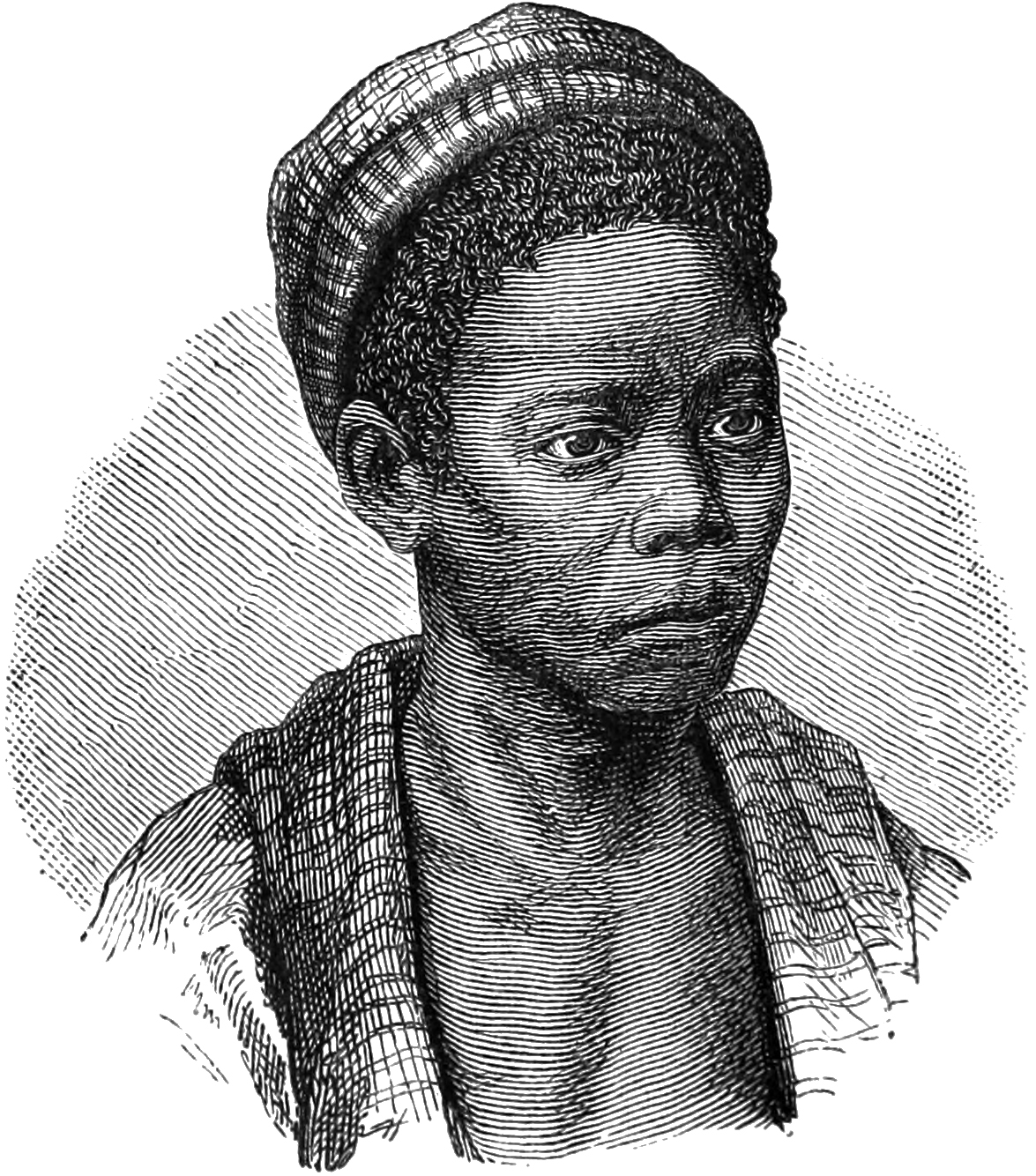
- A depiction of a Young Motswana woman by Emil Holub (1881)

Total population
- 7,108,467

Regions with significant populations
- Botswana: c. 2,000,000
- South Africa: 5,000,000 (Setswana-speakers)
- Namibia: 10,967 (2023 Census)
- Zimbabwe: c. 97,500

Languages
- Setswana; English, Afrikaans and Nama

Religion
- Christianity, Modimo

Related ethnic groups
- Sotho people, Bapedi people, Kgalagadi people, Coloureds, Griqua, Khoisan, San people

Batswana
- Person: Motswana
- People: Batswana
- Language: Setswana
- Country: Botswana

The Batswana (Tswana: Batswana, singular Motswana) are a Bantu ethnic group native to Southern Africa. Ethnic Tswana made up approximately 85% of the population of Botswana in 2011.

Batswana inhabit south and eastern Botswana and the North West, Northern Cape, Gauteng, Free State, and other provinces of South Africa.

== History ==
=== Pre-colonial settlement and chiefdom development ===
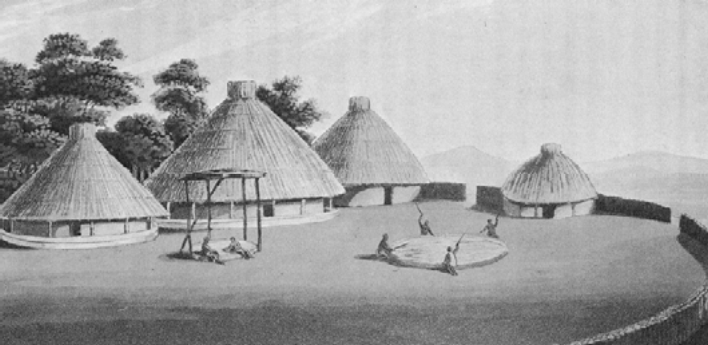
Depiction of a Precolonial Homestead in the ancient City of Kaditshwene circa early 1400

The Batswana are a Setswana-speaking ethnic group of several kingdoms, who inhabit Southern Africa (Parts of modern day Namibia, Botswana and South Africa). Before colonial rule, Tswana-speaking communities were organised into chiefdoms (merafe), often structured around clan-based lineages. Political authority was concentrated under dikgosi (chiefs), who governed through advisory councils and traditional institutions. Over time, several Tswana polities expanded and consolidated power through alliances, migration, and settlement formation in the interior regions of Southern Africa.

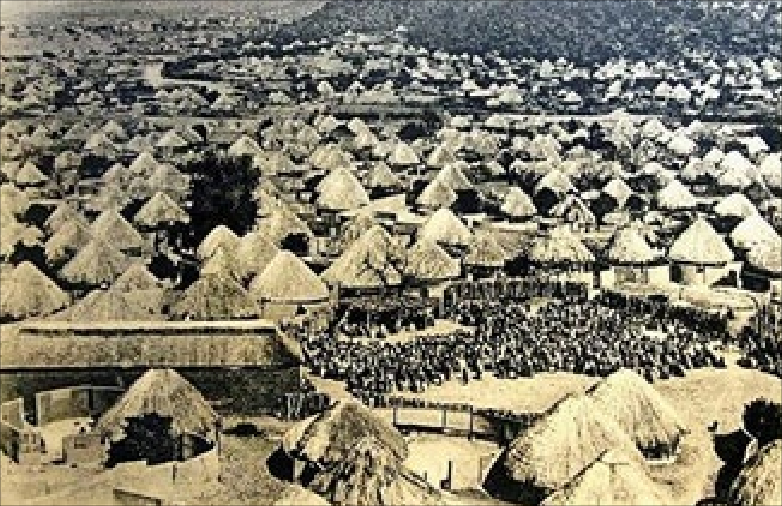
Mochudi Village in the early 19th century

Tswana political organisation was characterised by settlement hierarchy, cattle-based wealth, and customary law systems that regulated inheritance, marriage, land use, and social discipline. One of the earliest of these settlements was Toutswe in the eastern region of what is now Botswana, relying on Tswana cattle breeds held in kraals as their source of wealth. The arrival of the ancestors of the Tswana-speaking people who came to control the region (from the Vaal River to Botswana) has yet to be dated precisely, although CE 600 seems to be a consensus estimate. This massive cattle-raising complex prospered until 1300 CE or so. All these people were connected to trade routes that ran along the Limpopo River to the Indian Ocean, and goods from Asia, such as beads, made their way to the Batswana, most likely in exchange for ivory, gold, and rhinoceros horn. Traditional craft production historically included pottery, metalworking, woodworking, basket weaving, and leatherwork. Men commonly engaged in metal and wood production, while women were particularly associated with pottery and hut construction.

The first written records relating to modern-day Botswana appeared in 1824. What these records show is that the Bangwaketse had become the predominant power in the region. Under the rule of Makaba II, the Bangwaketse kept vast herds of cattle in well-protected desert areas and used their military prowess to raid their neighbours. Other chiefdoms in the area, by this time, had capitals of 10,000 or so and were fairly prosperous. One of these famous capitals was Kaditshwene, which was the cultural capital of the Bahurutshe people, one of the principal Batswana tribes, and a centre of manufacturing and trading. It had been founded in the late 1400s on the site of iron and copper ore deposits.

The remains of another major Batswana settlement, Kweneng' Ruins, are found in Suikerbosrand Nature Reserve in South Africa. It was occupied from the 15th to the 19th century CE and was the largest of several sizeable settlements inhabited by Setswana speakers before European arrival. Several circular stone-walled family compounds are spread out over an area of 10 km long and 2 km wide.

History of the Tswana People (Seven Years in South Africa by Emil Holub)

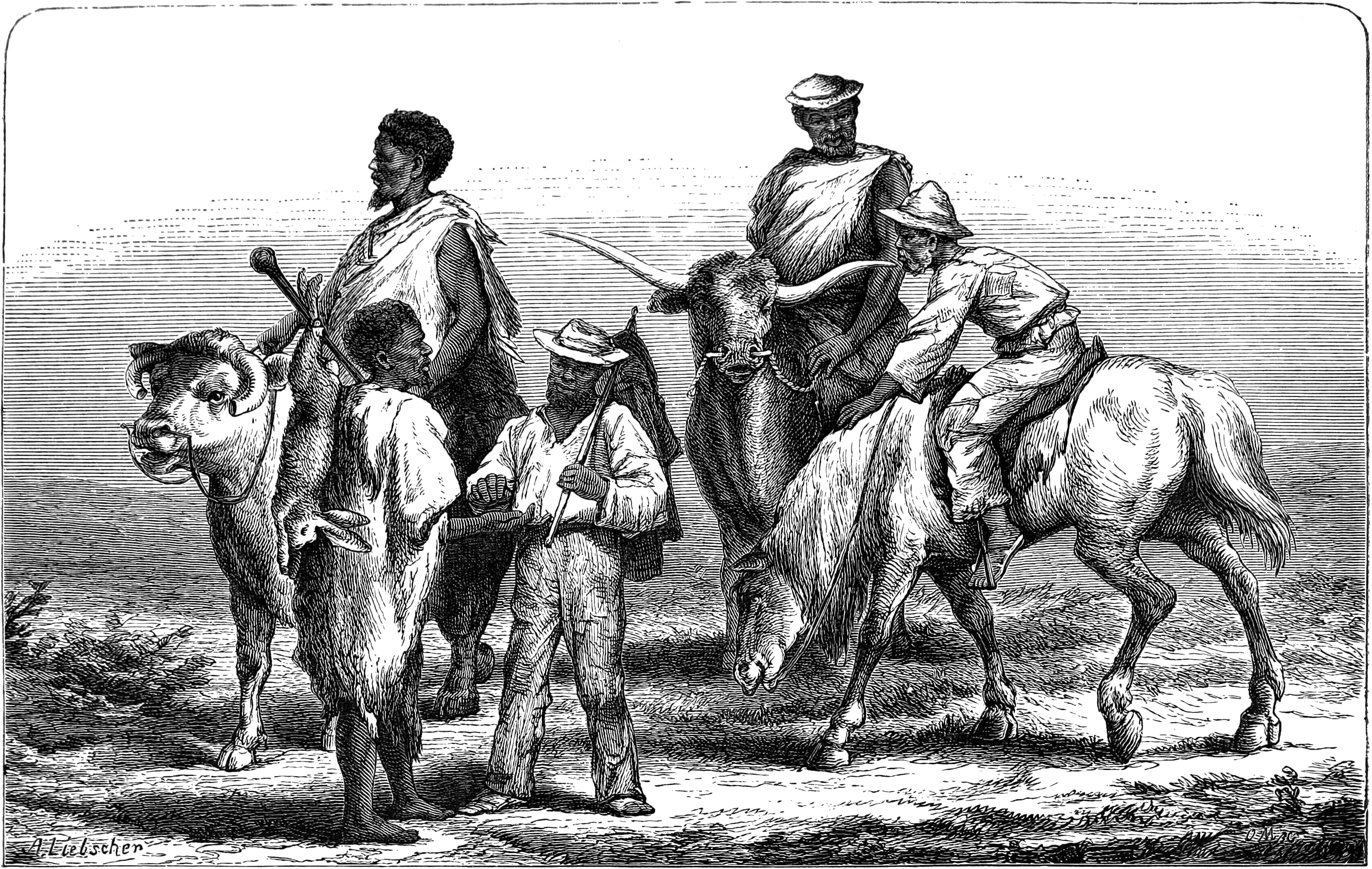
Batlhapings on a journey, Seven Years in South Africa, page 126

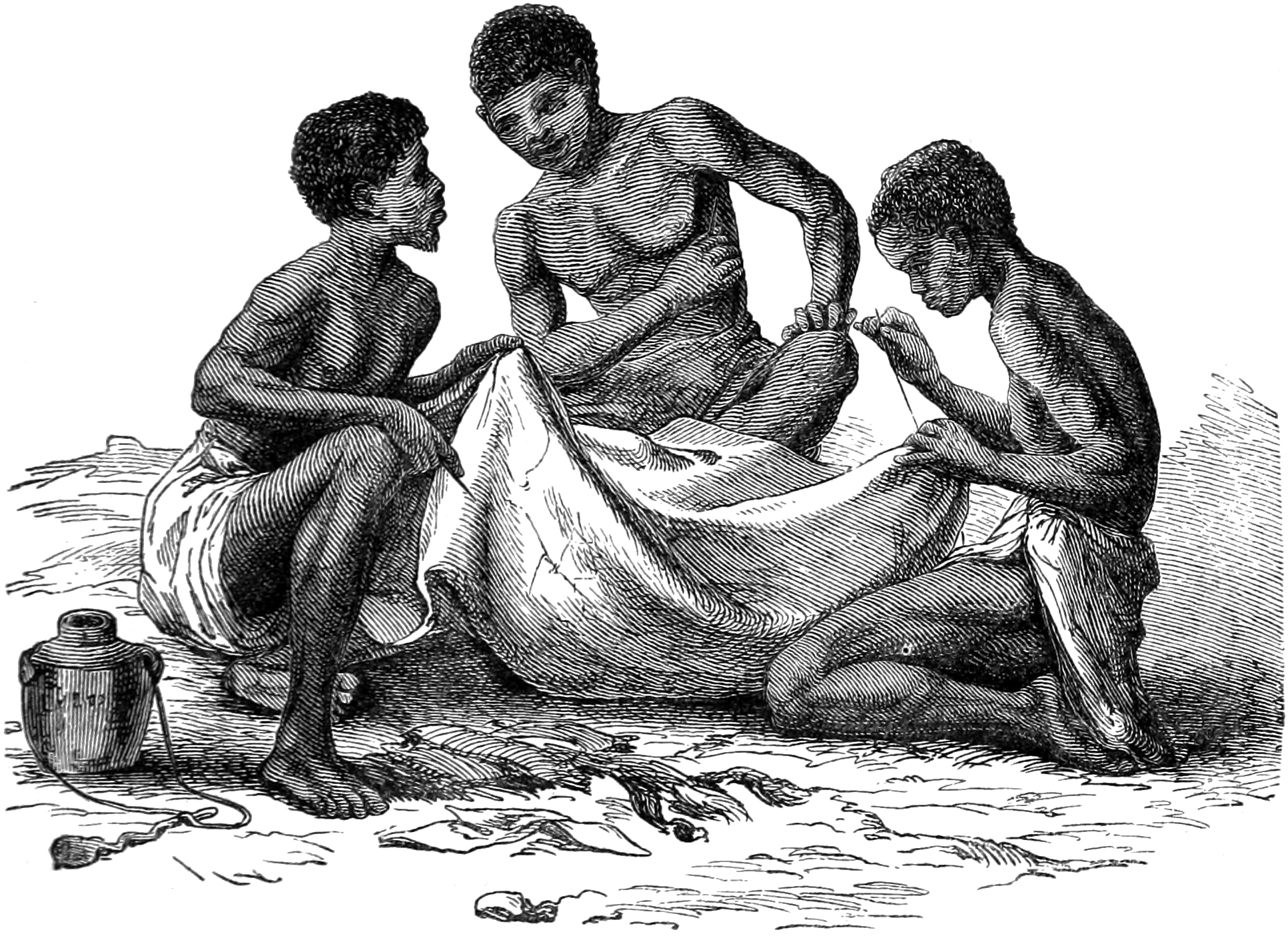
Batlhapings sewing, Seven Years in South Africa, page 133

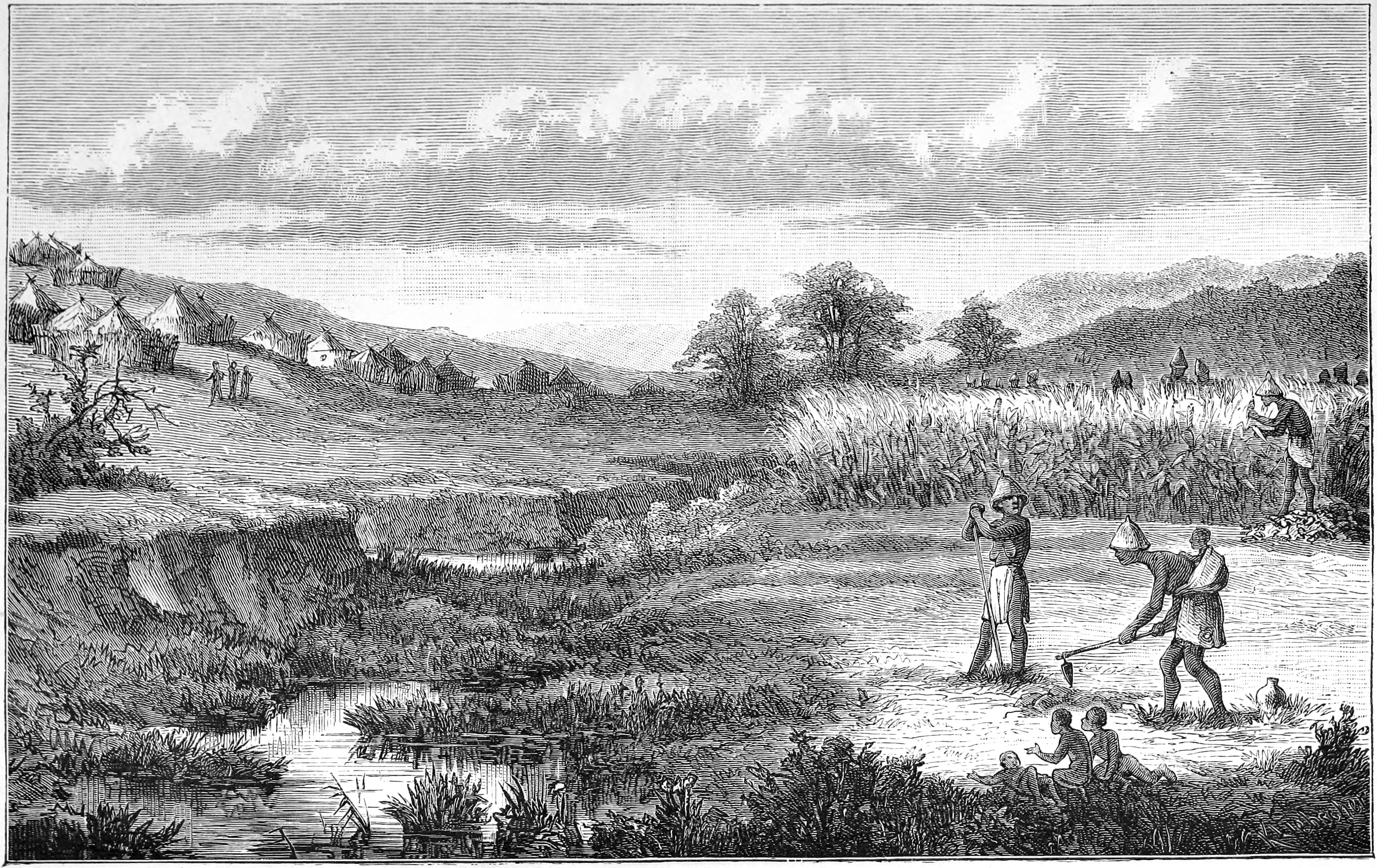
Batlhaping agriculture, Seven Years in South Africa, page 116

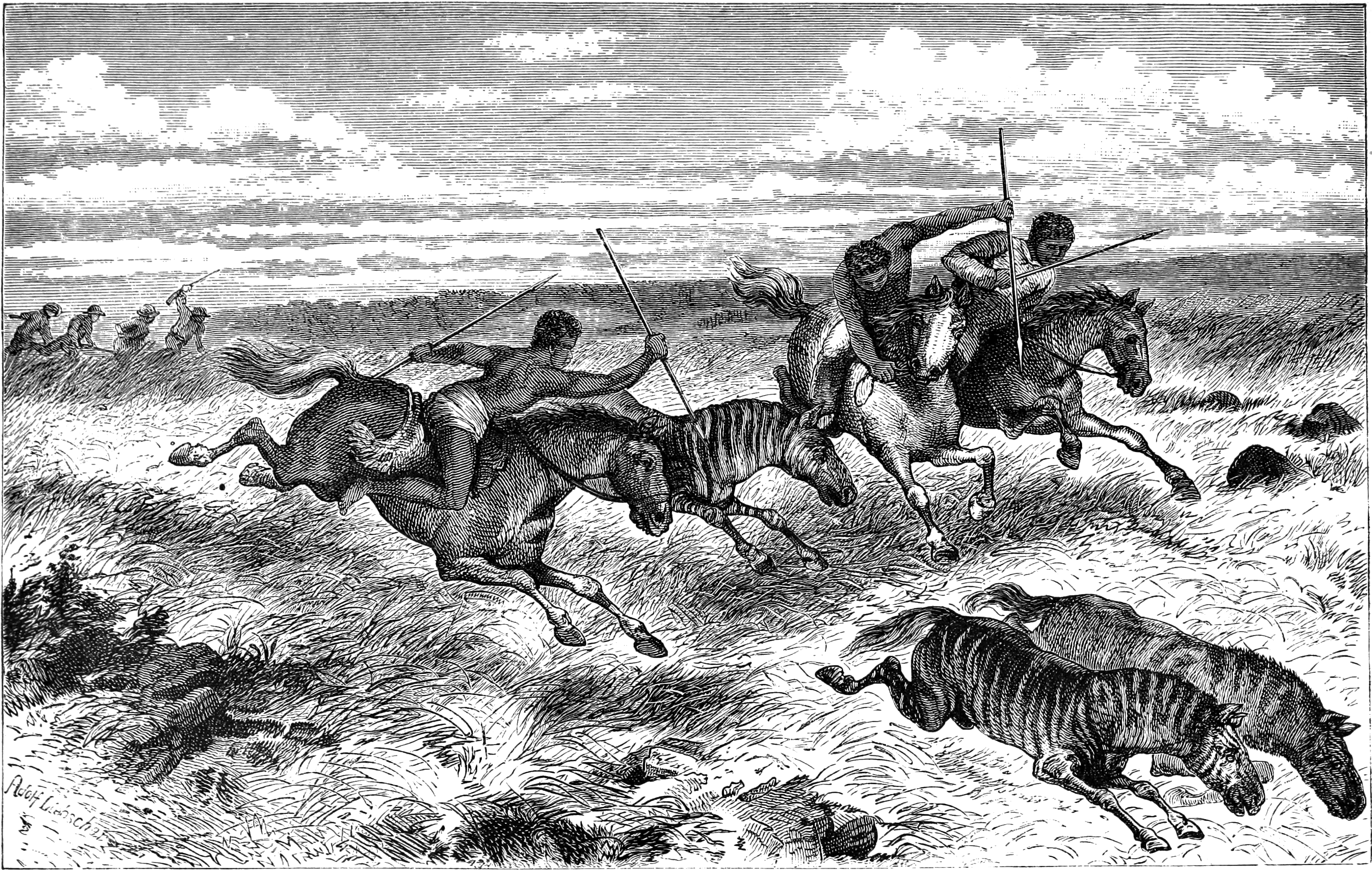
Barolongs hunting, Seven Years in South Africa, page 268

=== European missionary contact and Christianisation (mid-19th century) ===
During the mid-19th century, European missionaries increasingly established stations in Tswana territories. Missionary activity contributed to the gradual spread of Christianity and introduced new forms of literacy, education, and institutional influence. Several dikgosi adopted Christianity or allowed its expansion, which led to significant cultural transformation. The Christianization of the Tswana people (Batswana) is a landmark chapter in African history, primarily because it turned a remote mission station in the Kalahari into a global centre for linguistics and printing.

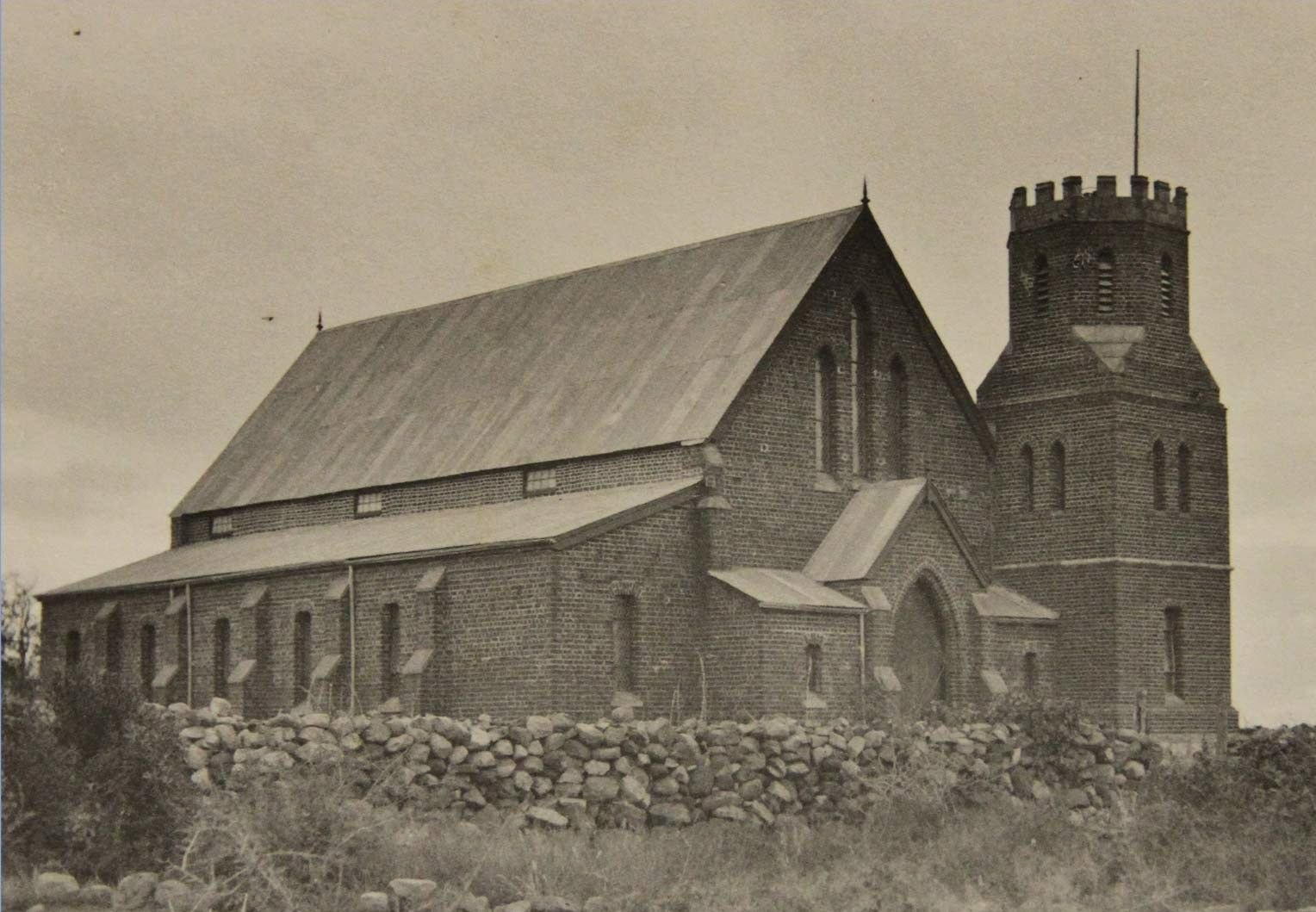
Old Palapye Church built by King Khama III in 1891

In the early 1800s, the London Missionary Society (LMS) pushed northward from the Cape Colony. Setswana was among the earliest Sotho–Tswana languages to be documented in writing by European travellers and scholars. Early linguistic references include Heinrich Lichtenstein’s 1806 writings, followed by vocabulary collections and linguistic observations produced by missionaries and explorers in the early 19th century. These early texts contributed to later missionary-based translation projects and literacy programmes that facilitated written Setswana usage in religious education and print publications. In 1824, Robert Moffat, a Scottish missionary, established the Kuruman Mission among the Batlhaping (a Tswana group). Unlike many missionaries who relied on interpreters, Moffat realised that for Christianity to "stick," it had to be communicated in the native tongue. He spent years living among the Batswana, mastering the nuances of Setswana. In 1830, the first piece of Scripture was published in Setswana, being the gospel of Luke. In 1857, the first complete Bible was translated and printed in a Sub-Saharan African language.

Traditional religious practices, including ancestral veneration and indigenous rituals, declined in influence in some communities as Christian doctrines became more widespread. Certain customary practices, such as polygyny, were increasingly contested and discouraged by missionary groups and colonial authorities.

== Conflicts and warfare in the 19th century ==
=== Early 1800s: Difaqane/Mfecane Turmoil (1815–1840) ===
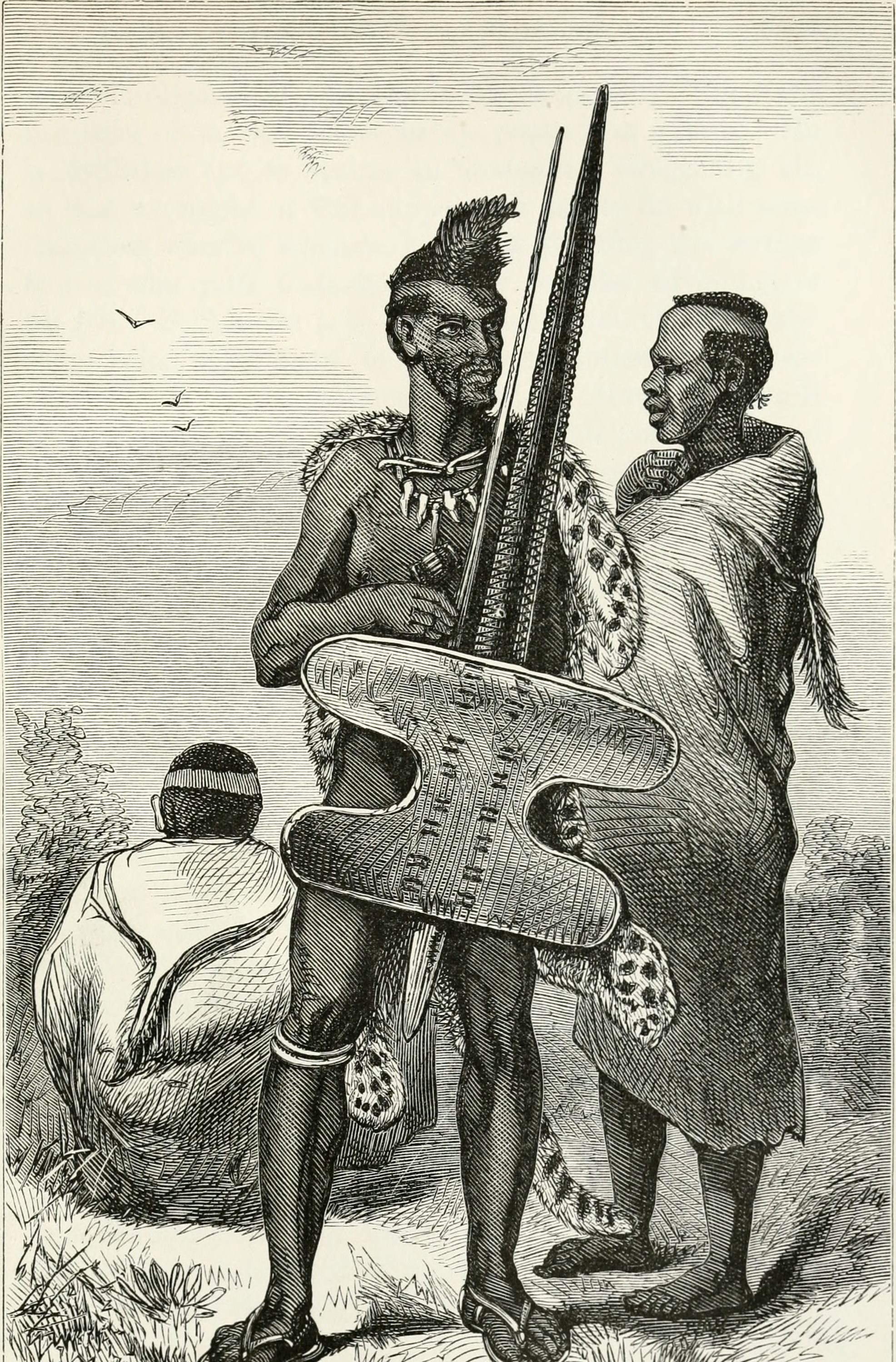
18th Century Tswana Warrior

In the early 19th century, the Batswana chiefdoms were heavily affected by the regional instability known as the Difaqane (also called the Mfecane). This period was characterised by widespread warfare, population displacement, and the collapse or reorganisation of many communities across Southern Africa.

As migrating armed groups moved northwards from present-day South Africa, several Tswana settlements were raided or forced to relocate. Some Batswana communities strengthened their defensive strategies, reorganised settlements, and consolidated political authority in response to these disruptions. This period contributed to the development of stronger centralised Tswana states such as the Bangwaketse, Bakwena, and Bangwato.

=== 1852–1860: The Batswana–Boer War: Battle of Dimawe ===
Kgosi Sechele I of the Bakwena (c. 1890), commander-in-chief of the Tswana forces at the Battle of Dimawe (1852), pictured with his royal guard. A formidable military leader and strategist, Sechele commanded armed Tswana resistance against Boer incursions and possessed an English-manufactured 6-pounder naval cannon

This era saw a growing militarisation of Tswana communities, including the acquisition of firearms and horses through trade networks. During the 1840s and 1850s, trade with Cape Colony-based merchants opened up and enabled the Batswana chiefdoms to rebuild. The Bakwena, Bangwaketse, Bangwato, and Batawana cooperated to control the lucrative ivory trade, and then used the proceeds to import horses and guns, which in turn enabled them to establish control over what is now Botswana. This process was largely complete by 1880, and thus the Bushmen, the Bakalanga, the Bakgalagadi, the Batswapong and other current minorities were subjugated by the Batswana. Following the Great Trek, Afrikaners from the Cape Colony established themselves on the borders of the Tswana-inhabited ancestral homelands in the Transvaal. In 1852, a coalition of Tswana chiefdoms led by Sechele I resisted Afrikaner incursions, which culminated in the pivotal showdown of the Battle of Dimawe fought with artillery and long range rifles as well as musket fire. Although it was the Boer Commando led by the Boer Commandant-General Pieter Scholtz and Paul Kruger, as officers leading the Boer advance, who started the offensive, it was they who ended up on the retreat, followed by Batswana's retaliatory attacks into the then Transvaal's Marique district, in which Boer settlements, villages, and farms were scorched. After about eight years of intermittent tensions and hostilities, they eventually came to a peace agreement in Potchefstroom in 1860. From that point on, the modern-day border between South Africa and Botswana was agreed upon, and the Afrikaners and Batswana traded and worked together peacefully.

=== 1880-1884: Tswana–Ndebele War: Battle of Khutiyabasadi ===
While the Tswana borders in the South were secured primarily due to an agreed peace agreement with the Boers, danger still lurked in the northern frontiers as Batswana experienced occasional incursions and raids by marauding Ndebele armies who had settled in Southern Zimbabwe. Ndebele raiding parties periodically attacked communities near the Okavango region, targeting cattle and captives.

In 1884, the Batawana under Kgosi Moremi engaged Ndebele forces near Toteng and later at the swampy terrain of Khutiyabasadi. The conflict culminated in the Battle of Khutiyabasadi, where the Batawana, supported by Wayeyi allies, defeated the Ndebele raiders using a combination of firearms, cavalry tactics, and ambush strategies suited to the Okavango environment.

The battle is remembered as a major Tswana victory, contributing to the decline of Ndebele influence in the region and strengthening Batawana authority in northwestern Botswana. While the battle at Khutiyabasadi was a great victory for the Batawana and a defeat for the AmaNdebele, for the Wayeyi of the region, the outcome is said to have been a mixed blessing. While they had shared in the victory over the hated Amandebele, one of its consequences was a tightening of Batawana authority in the area over them as Moremi settled for a period at nearby Nokaneng.

=== 1893–1894: Tswana Involvement in the First Matabele War ===
The First Matabele War was fought between 1893 and 1894 in modern-day Zimbabwe. The British South Africa Company had no more than 750 troops in the British South Africa Company's Police, with an undetermined number of possible colonial volunteers and an additional 700 Tswana (Bechuana) allies who marched on Bulawayo from the south commandeered by Khama III, the most influential of the Batswana chiefs, and a staunch ally of the British. The Salisbury and Fort Victoria columns marched into Bulawayo on 4 November 1893. The Imperial column from Bechuanaland was nowhere to be seen. They had set march on 18 October heading north for Bulawayo and had a minor skirmish with the Matabele near Mphoengs on 2 November. They finally reached Bulawayo on 15 November, a delay which probably saved the Chartered Company's then newly occupied territory being annexed to the imperial Bechuanaland Protectorate. The involvement of Batswana reflected both strategic alliance-building and the desire of some Tswana rulers to counter Ndebele power, which had previously threatened Tswana territories through raids. Following the defeat of the Ndebele, British colonial influence expanded further north, increasing imperial control over the region.

== Dynasties and tribe ==
=== Botswana ===
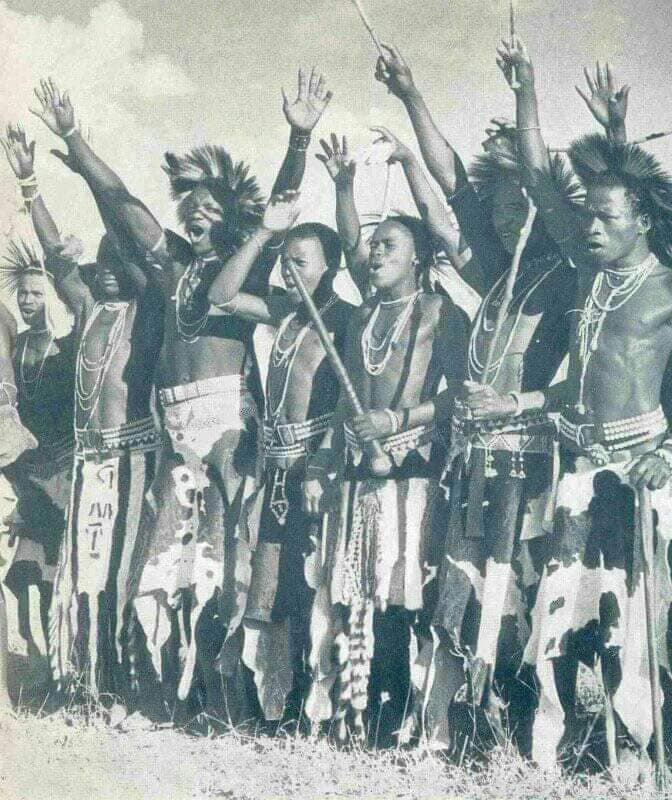
Batswana men dressed in traditional attire during the visit of King George VI, Queen Elizabeth, and Princesses Elizabeth and Margaret to Lobatse, Bechuanaland, on 17 April 1947

The republic of Botswana (formerly the British protectorate of Bechuanaland) is named for the Tswana people. The country's eight major tribes speak Tswana, which is also called Setswana. All have a traditional Paramount Chief, styled Kgosikgolo, who is entitled to a seat in the Ntlo ya Dikgosi (an advisory body to the country's Parliament). A person who lives in Botswana is a Motswana and the plural is Batswana. The principal Tswana tribes are the:

- Kwena tribe
- Bangwaketse
- Rolong tribe
- Kgatla tribe
- Mangwato tribe
- Taung tribe
- Batlhaping tribe
- Tlôkwa tribe
- Tlharo tribe
- Royal Bafokeng Nation

=== South Africa ===

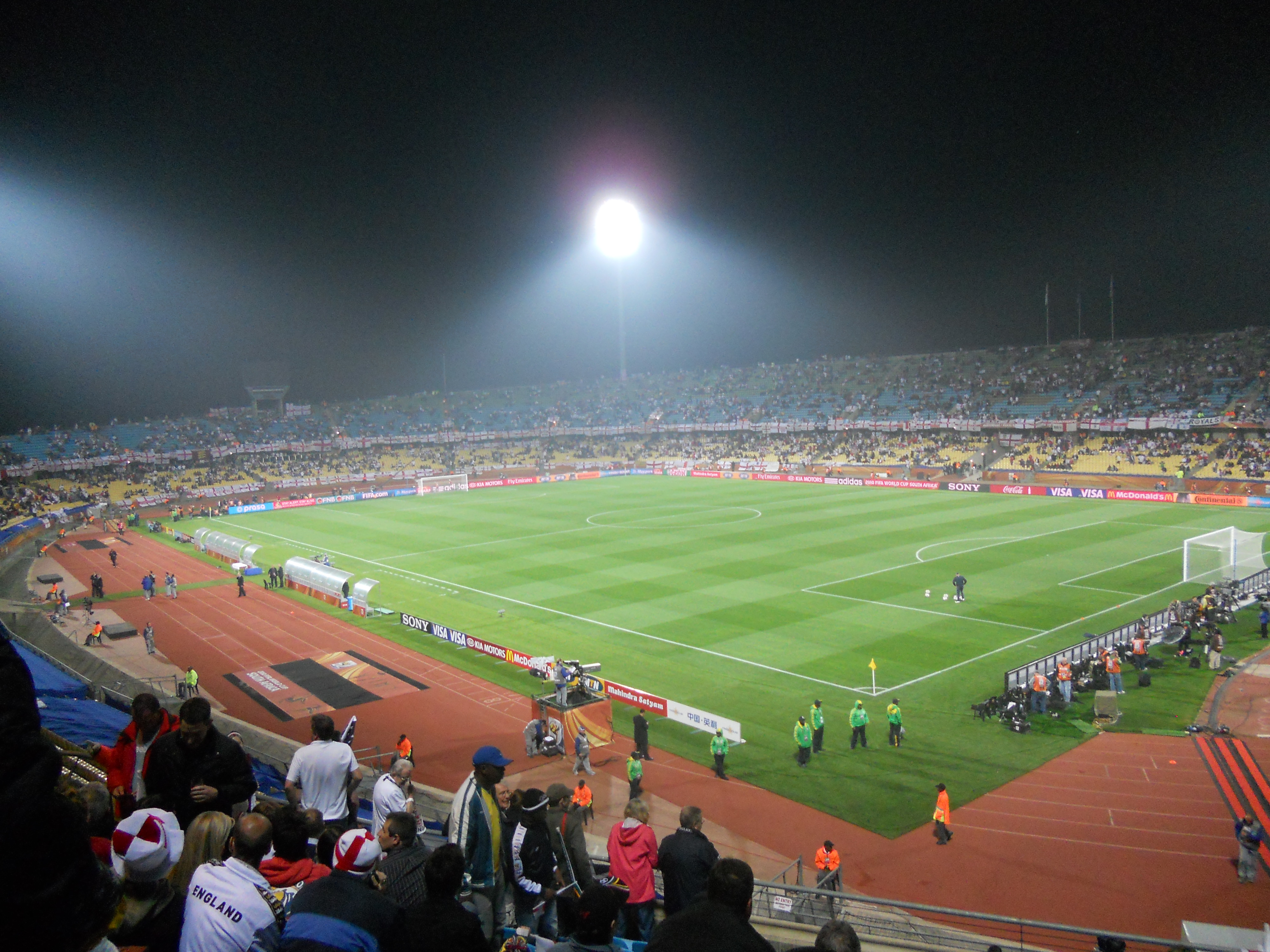
Tswana speakers proportion map in South Africa (top) and Royal Bafokeng Stadium, Phokeng (bottom)

The largest number of ethnic Tswana people is located in modern-day South Africa. They are one of the largest ethnic groups in the country, and the Tswana language is one of eleven official languages in South Africa. There were over 4 million Tswana speakers in the country in 2012, with North West Province having a majority of 2,200,000 Tswana speakers. The principal Tswana tribal clans are the Bahurutshe, Bakgatla-ba-kgafela, Barolong, Batlhaping and Bafokeng. The Bahurutshe are primarily found in the Ngaka Modiri Molema Administrative District. Specifically, they reside in areas like Zeerust and Marico, under the Ramotshere Moiloa Local Municipality. The Bakgatla-ba-Kgafela have a significant presence in the Pilanesberg area of South Africa's North West Province. Their tribal capital, Moruleng, is located near the Bakgatla Gate of Pilanesberg National Park. Barolong-boo-Ratshidi communities can be found in the North West Province with Mahikeng as their capital, and in the Free State, can be found in Thaba Nchu. Batlhaping can be found in the North West province, especially in Greater Taung Municipality with Taung as their capital, and the Northern Cape. Bafokeng, sometimes referred to as Royal Bafokeng, are primarily found in the Phokeng area around the Rustenberg area. The Bafokeng have generated substantial wealth through platinum mining on their land and established a sovereign wealth fund, Royal Bafokeng Holdings, to manage and invest the community's income. Widely regarded as Africa's most progressive community investment model, the fund oversees assets valued at approximately $4 billion, including investments such as the Royal Bafokeng Stadium, Royal Marang Hotel, and Lebone College. Urbanised Tswana people in South Africa are found in large numbers in places like Potchefstroom, Klerksdorp, Randfontein and Pretoria. In Pretoria where Batswana make up the majority they speak a dialect called have Sepitori also known as Pretoria Sotho, which is an urbanised dialect of Setswana mixed with words from other languages and dialects. It is distinct from the standard language spoken in the North West Province or other parts of Botswana. From 1948 to 1994, South African Tswana people were defined by the Apartheid regime to be citizens of Bophuthatswana, one of ten bantustans set up for the purpose of defending the policy of denying black Africans citizenship in South Africa.

=== Bophuthatswana ===
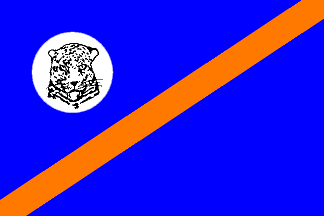
Flag of Bophuthatswana

The Bophuthatswana Territorial Authority was created in 1961, and in June 1972 Bophuthatswana was declared a self-governing state. On 6 December 1977 this 'homeland' was granted independence by the South African government. Bophuthatswana's capital city was Mmabatho and 99% of its population was Tswana speaking. In March 1994, Bophuthatswana was placed under the control of two administrators, Tjaart van der Walt and Job Mokgoro. The small, widespread pieces of land were reincorporated into South Africa on 27 April 1994. Bophuthatswana now forms part of the North West, Free State, Northern Cape, and Gauteng provinces.

== Traditional Governance Institutions ==
=== Kgotla system ===
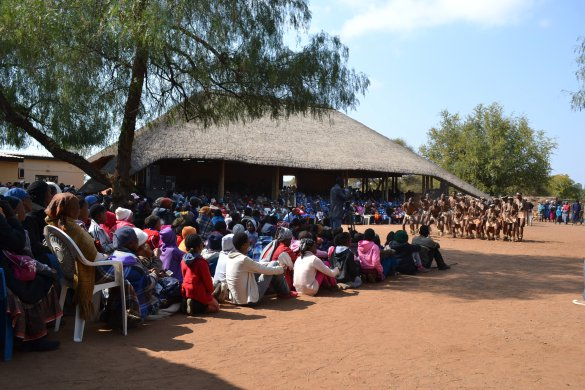
Typical Kgotla setting

A central institution in Tswana governance has historically been the kgotla, a public assembly where disputes are resolved, policies discussed, and communal decisions debated. The kgotla has often been described as a key platform for participatory governance and consultation.

However, historically, the institution largely excluded women from formal political debate, reflecting gender distinctions in public authority structures. Despite its participatory character, the political sphere traditionally operated primarily through male councils and chiefly authority.

There is a famous Tswana proverb: "Mmualebe o a bo a bua la gagwe" (even the one who speaks "badly" must be allowed to speak). This is the cornerstone of kgotla governance. Unlike Western-style voting where a majority wins and a minority loses, the kgotla seeks consensus. Everyone is allowed to voice their opinion, regardless of status, until the Kgosi "wraps up" (go tshwaraganya) the various views into a final decision that the community can live with.In Botswana, the kgotla system is officially recognized by the state. Customary Courts: Many civil cases are handled in the kgotla rather than in magistrate courts, as they are faster and more accessible.

=== Kinship and Descent ===
Tswana kinship systems have historically emphasised patrilineal descent, with inheritance and political succession generally following male lineage. However, the system also contains elements of cognatic kinship through marriage alliances, including cousin marriages in some contexts, which may create overlapping social networks and flexible kinship ties.

=== Mephato age-regiment system ===
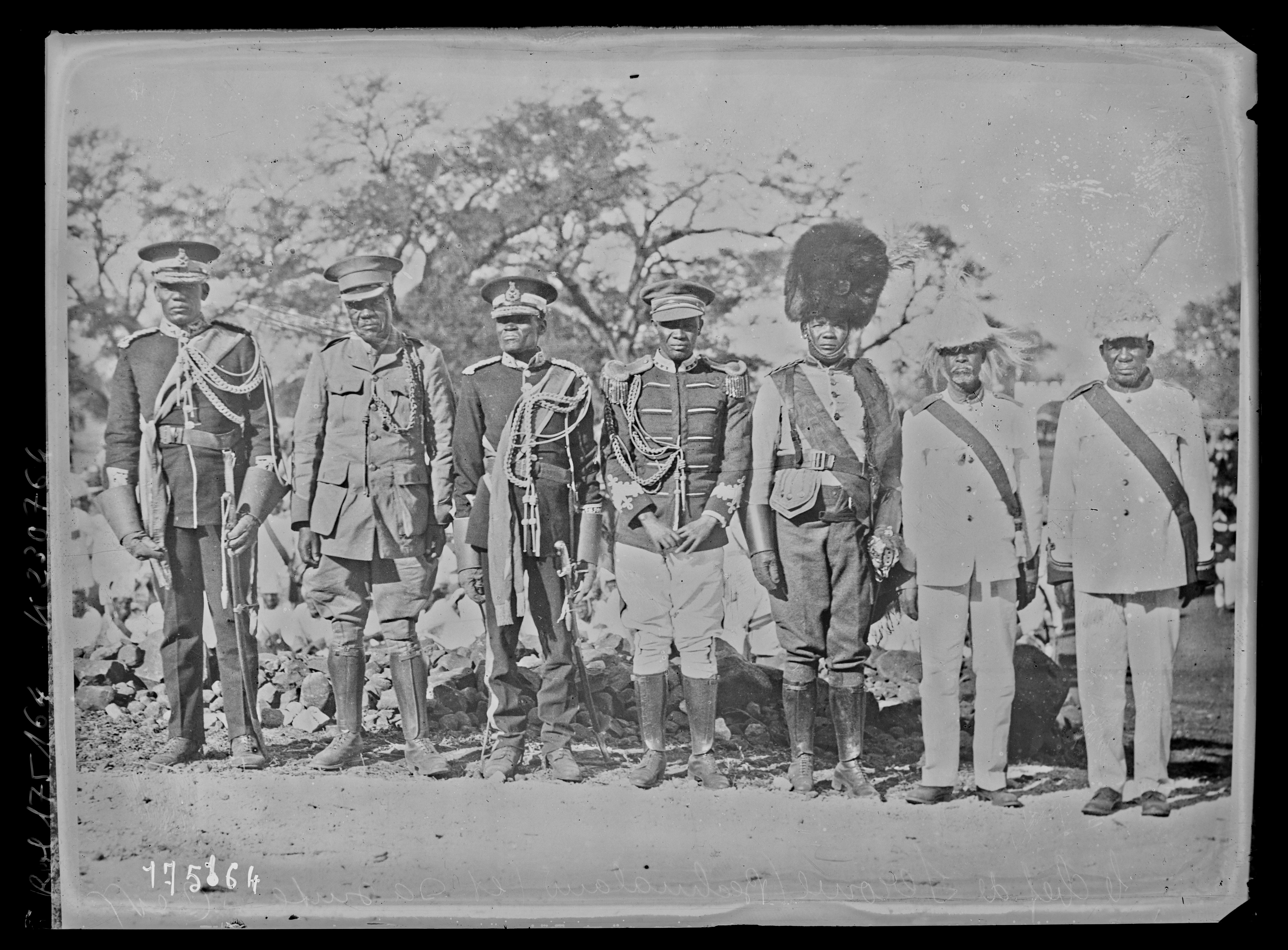
Kgosi Sekgoma II and leaders of the Bangwato Military regiments in Serowe during the royal visit of the Prince of Wales in June 1925.

The mephato system is an age-regiment structure through which individuals were incorporated into organised social cohorts. Membership was not voluntary, but based on cultural criteria such as birth order, lineage, and historical timing. The system reinforced social cohesion, military organisation, and community identity. Boys of 16 years were taken to a remote place and circumcised. Upon completing this training, the young men were brought to the kgotla (public assembly), given a regimental name, and presented with weapons, which included specialized daggers, to mark their new status as warriors and citizens. Some female mephato were formed independently of male regiments, particularly in contexts where settlement relocation or chiefly installation ceremonies required symbolic recognition of women’s societal role.

Graduation daggers given to men's military regiments

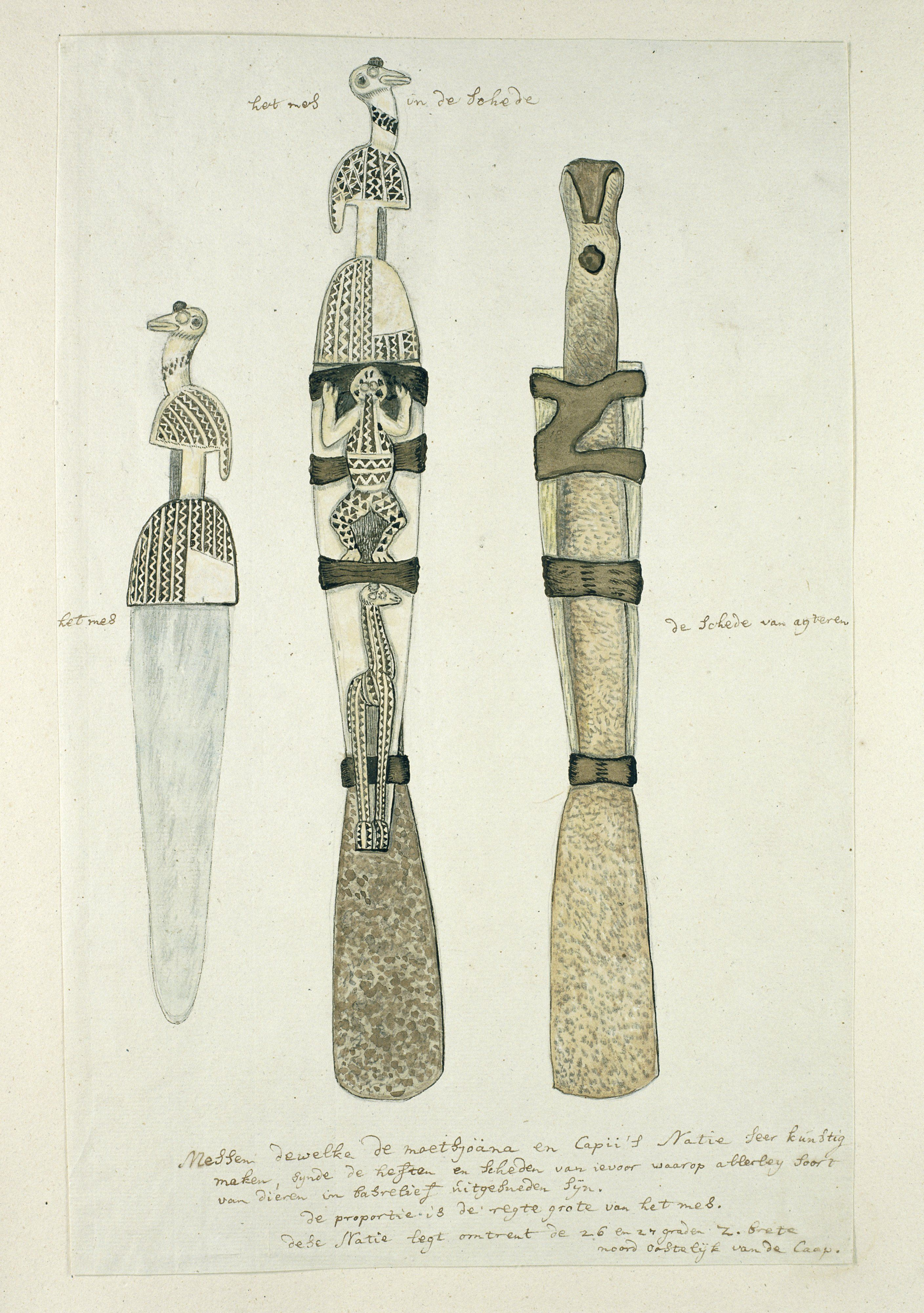
A late 18th-century Dutch sketch of a Tswana (Moetjoana) knife and ivory sheath.

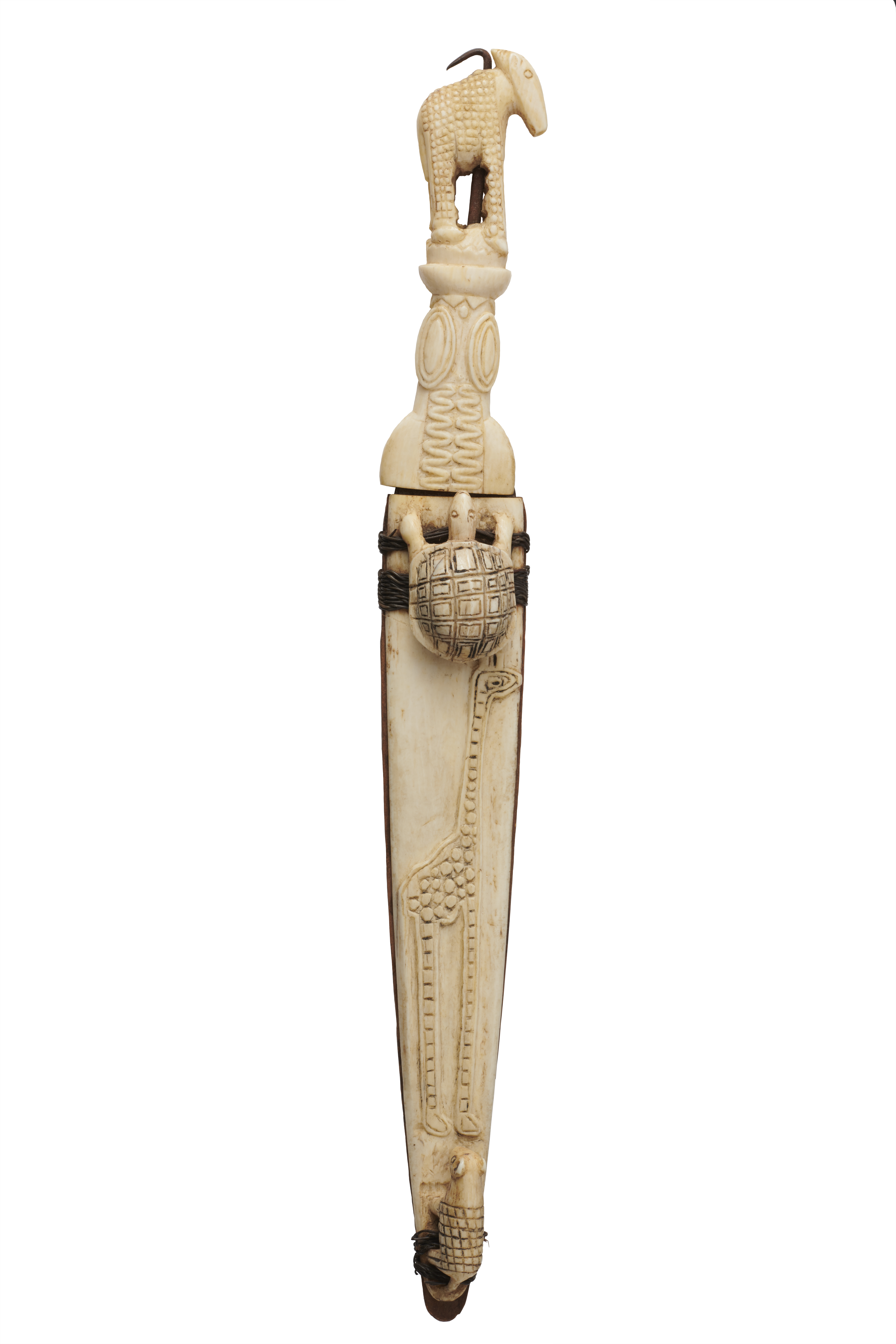
Sheath made of ivory relief carvings of a tortoise & giraffe

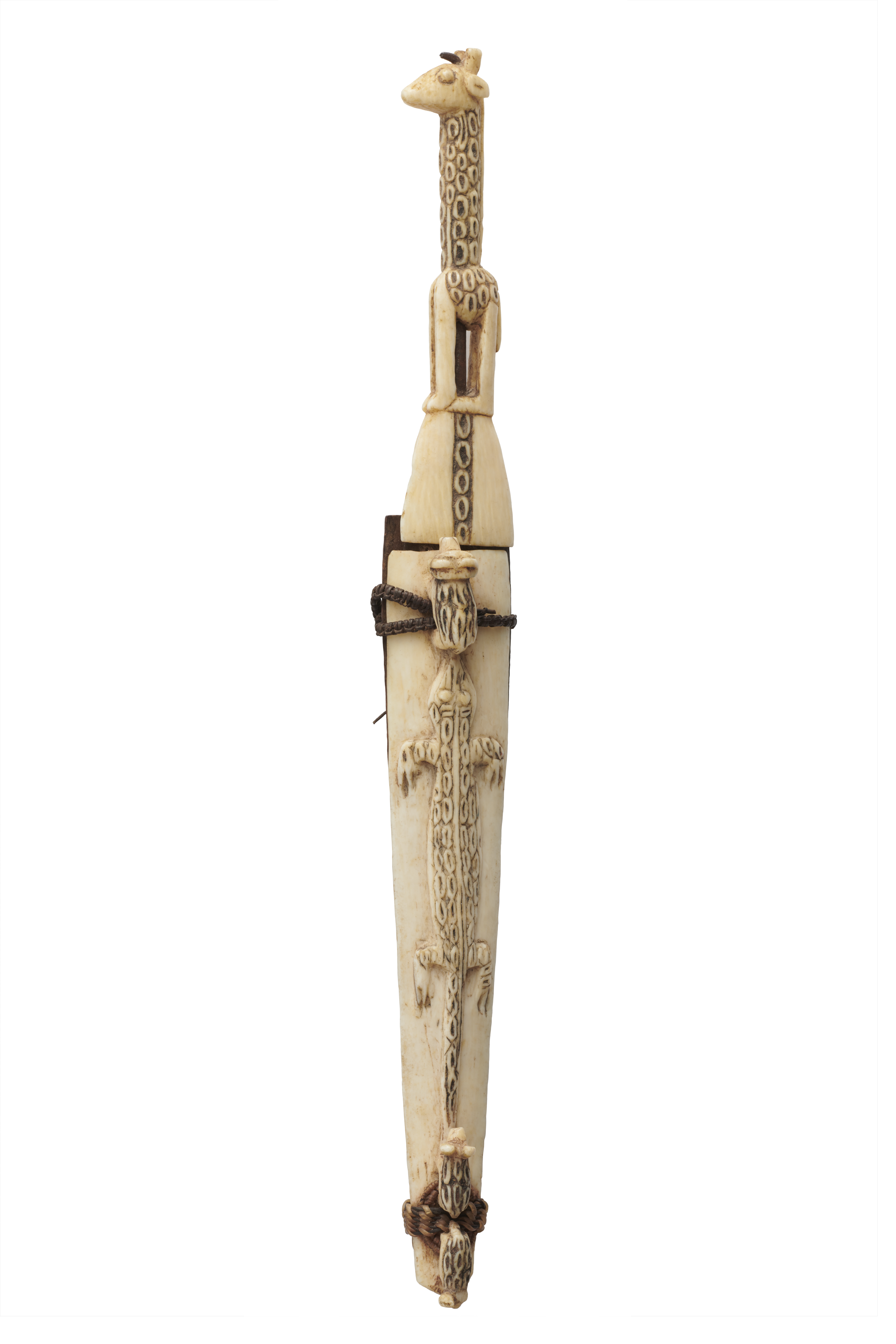
Knife and sheath displayed at Brighton Museum

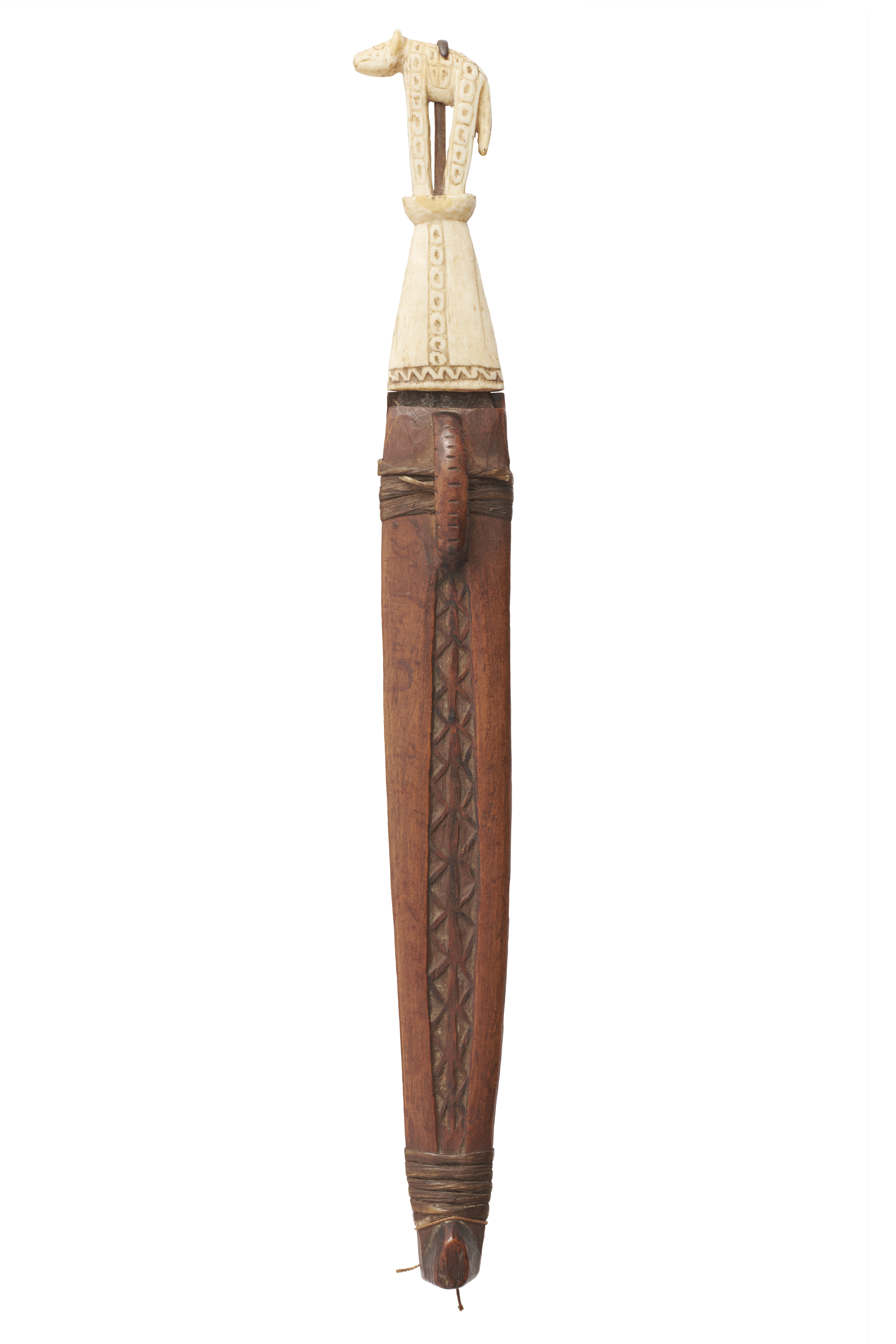
Dagger made of ivory handle & wooden sheath

=== Bojale (female initiation) ===
Bojale is a traditional Tswana initiation practice through which girls were incorporated into female mephato. The ceremony historically included training in songs, community responsibilities, morality, and preparation for marriage and motherhood. During the colonial period and the spread of Christianity, bojale practices underwent transformation, including changes in duration and reduced secrecy. In some communities, ceremonies that previously lasted weeks were shortened due to schooling and wage employment.

=== Male initiation (bogwera) and pre-initiation (bogwane) ===
Male initiation historically included preparatory phases such as bogwane, during which boys formed groups and engaged in tasks that symbolised their transition toward adulthood. Once formally enrolled into initiation camps, initiates entered a structured system of training, discipline, and symbolic instruction. Over time, colonial rule, Christianity, and changing social conditions contributed to the decline or modification of many initiation customs, including dress, rituals, and duration. Some Tswana clans, such as Bakgatla and Balete, have in recent years, revived the practice.

== Religion and Philosophy ==
=== Monotheism (Modimo) ===
Traditional Tswana belief systems were historically centred around Modimo (God), regarded as a supreme spiritual force associated with creation and cosmic order. Modimo was not always conceptualised in anthropomorphic terms and was frequently understood as transcending gender and physical representation. Religious life also placed significant emphasis on Badimo (ancestral spirits), who were believed to influence human affairs and serve as intermediaries between Modimo and the living. Oral traditions also include references to spiritual or mythical entities such as Loowe, Tintibane, and Matsieng, often associated with caves, footprints, and sacred places.

According to Tswana creation myths, the first man and animals emerged from a hole in the earth at a site known as Lowe (near Mochudi). This figure, often identified as Matsieng, is said to have left giant footprints in the sandstone while the earth was still soft.

The Badimo (ancestors) serve as intermediaries between the living and Modimo. The relationship is maintained through rituals of "cooling" (go fola) or libations (go phasa). It is believed that the ancestors can influence the weather, particularly the arrival of rain (Pula), which is considered the ultimate spiritual and physical blessing in the semi-arid Tswana lands.

== Bogadi (bridewealth) and marriage practices ==
Marriage among Tswana communities has traditionally been formalised through the exchange of bogadi (bridewealth), typically in cattle. Bogadi historically served to legitimise unions, establish inter-family alliances, and confirm rights and responsibilities concerning children and inheritance.

Polygyny was historically practised in many Tswana chiefdoms, particularly among elites, although Christian influence and modern legal reforms contributed to its decline in formal status. Marriage negotiations (patlo) were traditionally conducted between families and were often dominated by male elders, with women’s participation in formal negotiation historically limited.

== Setswana food and cuisine ==
Bogobe is a staple food made from sorghum meal which is often eaten alongside meat or vegetables. The most popular sorghum porridge is Ting. Bogobe jwa Logala/Sengana is a traditional Setswana dish prepared from sorghum porridge mixed/cooked with milk. Seswaa is Botswana's national dish and is often served at weddings, funerals, and other celebrations. Seswaa is a pounded or shredded meat and often served with Bogobe (Porridge). Madila is a sour cultured milk prepared from cow and goat milk over a period of time until fully matured for consumption. Traditionally madila were prepared using Lekuka a leather sack or bag used in processing and storing madila. Madila is also traditionally used as relish, eaten with pap. It can also be used in popular Tswana breakfast meal, motogo, to give the soft porridge that sour and milky taste.

== Culture and attire ==
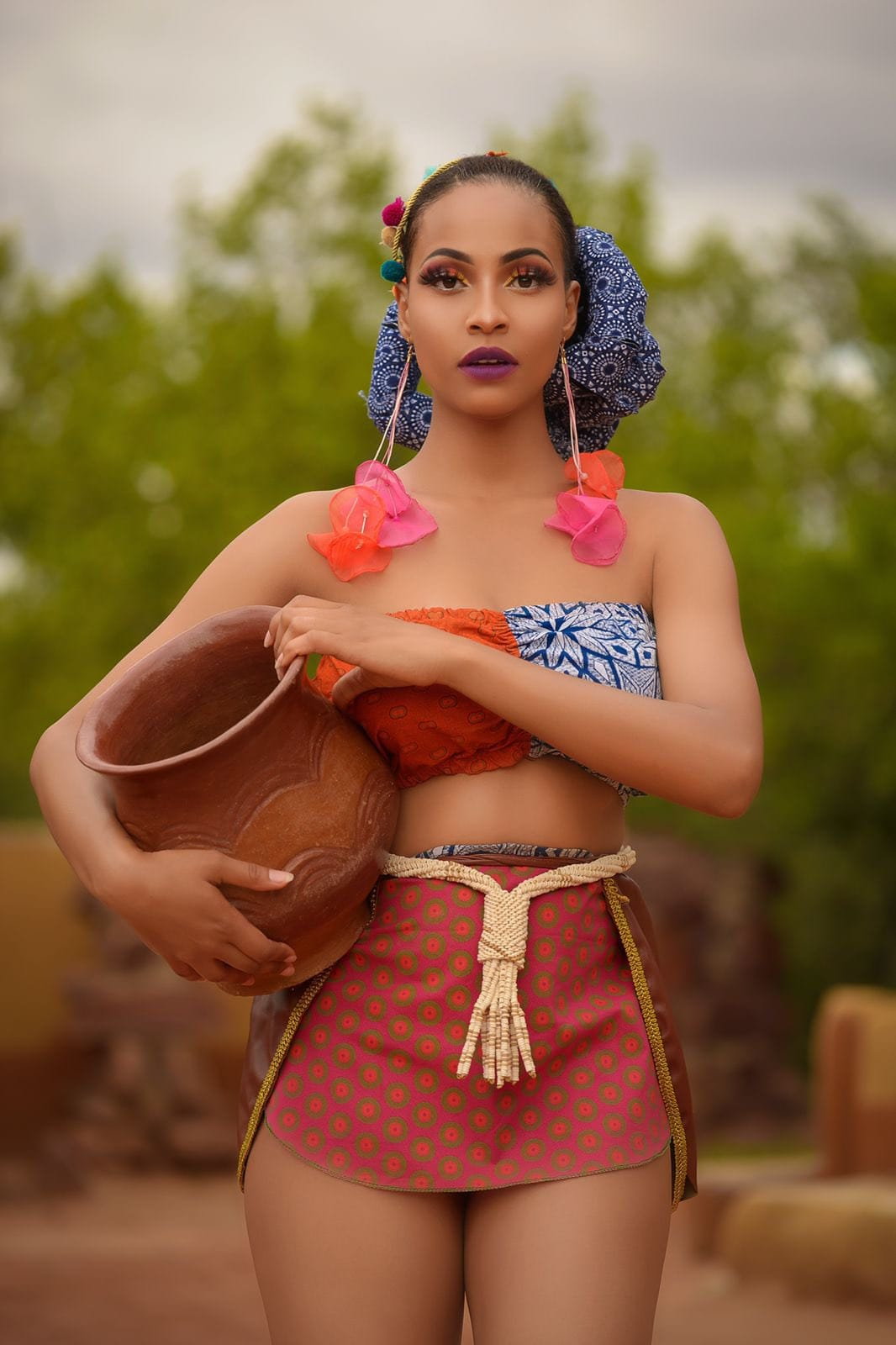
Young Tswana maiden dressed in Leteisi

Batswana wear a cotton fabric known in Setswana as Leteisi and Sotho as Shweshwe. This fabric is often used for wedding celebrations and other traditional celebrations. In Setswana tradition mothers wear mogagolwane, a checkered small blanket during traditional baby-showers, and married women during traditional weddings are identified by it, as well as during various initiation ceremonies. Even during funerals Batswana women don mogagolwane.

== Music ==
Tswana music is mostly vocal and performed, sometimes without drums depending on the occasion; it also makes heavy use of string instruments. Tswana folk music has instruments such as Setinkane (a Botswana version of miniature piano), Segankure/Segaba (a Botswana version of the Chinese instrument Erhu), Moropa (Meropa -plural) (a Botswana version of the many varieties of drums), and phala (a Botswana version of a whistle used mostly during celebrations, which comes in a variety of forms). Botswana cultural musical instruments are not confined only to the strings or drums. the hands are used as musical instruments too, by either clapping them together or against phathisi (goat skin turned inside out wrapped around the calf area; it is only used by men) to create music and rhythm. For the last few decades, the guitar has been celebrated as a versatile music instrument for Tswana music as it offers a variety in string which the Segaba instrument does not have. Other notable modern Tswana music is Tswana Rap known as Motswako.

== Visual arts ==
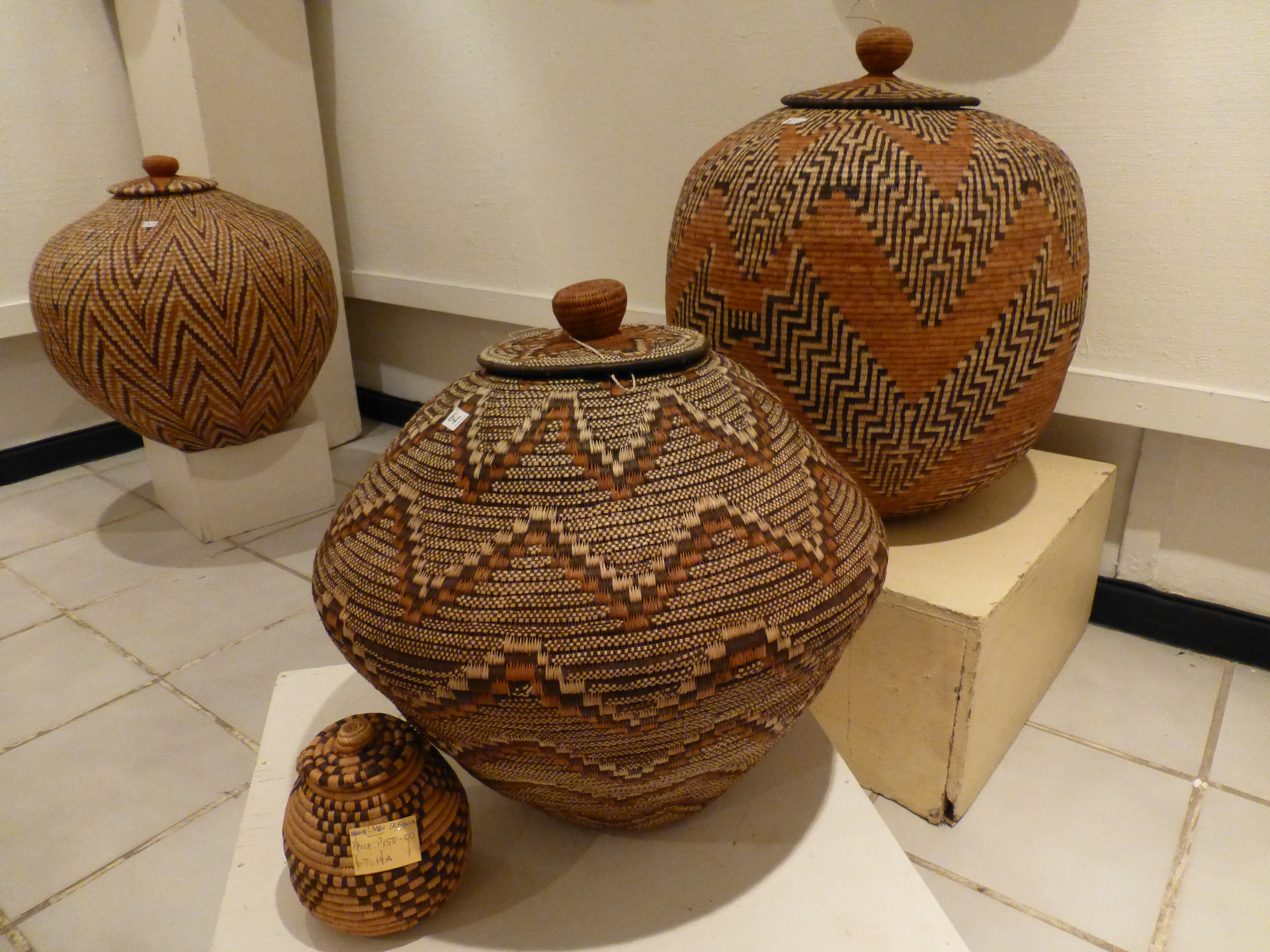
Tswana Baskets used for storing grain

Batswana are noted for their skill at crafting baskets from Mokola Palm and local dyes. The baskets are generally woven into three types: large, lidded baskets used for storage, large, open baskets for carrying objects on the head or for winnowing threshed grain, and smaller plates for winnowing pounded grain. Potters made clay pots for storing water, traditional beer and also for cooking and hardly for commercial use. Craft makers made wooden crafts and they made traditional cooking utensils such as leso and lehetlho, traditional wooden chairs and drums among others.

== Tswana astronomy ==
Astronomy is an age old tradition in Africa. As with all other cultures, various ethnic groups developed their own interpretations of the Solar System. Using their natural instrument the eye, Batswana have observed, commented on and named celestial objects of interest to them. There are more telling and specific names that relate to unique stellar patterns and their seasonal appearance e.g. Selemela, Naka, Thutlwa, and Dikolojwane. According to Tswana culture, the stars of Orion's sword were "dintsa le Dikolobe", three dogs chasing three pigs of Orion's belt. The Milky Way was viewed by the Tswana as Molalatladi, the place where lightning rests. It was further believed that this place of rest also kept the sky from collapsing and showed the movement of time. Some even claimed that it turned the Sun to the east, in a way to explaining the rising of the sun. It was also believed that it was a supernatural footpath across the sky along which ancestors' spirits walked. The Moon (Ngwedi) is said to represent a woman; it brings forth light but not as scorching as the Sun (Letsatsi) and its light is associated with happiness. Venus is called Mphatlalatsana (the brilliant and blinding one) by Batswana & Kopadilalelo (seeker of evening meals).

Raditladi Basin, a large peak ring impact crater on Mercury with a diameter of 263 km is named after Leetile Disang Raditladi, a Motswana playwright and poet.

== Notable Batswana and people of Tswana descent ==
=== Activism, authorship, academics and science ===
- Keorapetse Kgositsile, Late South African ANC activist, writer and author
- Prof Dan Kgwadi, Late Vice-chancellor, North-West UniversityVaal University of Technology
- Z. K. Matthews, academic in South Africa, lecturing at the University of Fort Hare in 1955
- Thebe Medupe, a physics professor at North West University
- Dr. Matshidiso Moeti, Regional Director of the WHO Regional Office for Africa
- Silas Molema, South African doctor, politician, author and activist
- Sol Plaatje, South African ANC activist, writer and author

=== Politics, royalty, activism, business and economics ===
- Frances Baard, Organiser of the African National Congress (ANC) Women's League and Trade Unionist
- Bathoen I, former Kgosi (paramount chief) of the Ngwaketse
- Duma Boko, lawyer, jurist and politician. President of Botswana
- Manne Dipico, first premier of Northern Cape province, South Africa
- Winkie Direko, former premier of Free State and former chancellor of University of Free State
- Unity Dow, Botswana former High Court judge, author, activist and Minister
- Kgosi Puso Gaborone, The King(Kgosi) of the BaTlokwa tribe of Tlokweng in Botswana
- John Taolo Gaetsewe, trade unionist, member of the ANC and General Secretary of SACTU, Robben Island prisoner, banned person
- Khama III, King of Bamangwato
- Ian Khama, fourth President of Botswana
- Seretse Khama, first President of Botswana
- Moses Kotane, South African politician and activist
- David Magang, Botswana lawyer, businessman and politician
- Supra Mahumapelo, South African politician
- Mmusi Maimane, South African politician
- Toto Makgolokwe, Paramount Chief (kgosi) of the Batlharo tribe of South Africa
- Lucas Mangope, former President of Bophutatswana
- Quett Masire, second President of Botswana
- Mokgweetsi Masisi, President of Botswana
- Joe Matthews, South African politician
- Joe Modise, South African politician
- Thandi Modise, South African freedom fighter
- Festus Mogae, third President of Botswana
- Mogale Mogale, Chief of Bapo ba Mogale
- Mogoeng Mogoeng, Chief Justice, South Africa
- Job Mokgoro, South African politician and academic
- Yvonne Mokgoro, former South African Constitutional Court Justice
- Brian Molefe, South African businessman, appointed CEO of Transnet in February 2011, and CEO of Eskom in April 2015
- Popo Molefe, first premier of North West province, South Africa
- Edna Molewa, South African politician
- Leruo Molotlegi, King of the Royal Bafokeng Nation
- Ruth Mompati, South African political activist
- James Moroka, one of the ANC Presidents (1949 to 1952)
- Dikgang Moseneke, South African judge and former Deputy Chief Justice of South Africa
- Nthato Motlana, prominent South African businessman, physician and anti-apartheid activist
- Bridgette Motsepe, South African businesswoman
- Patrice Motsepe, South African billionaire mining businessman
- Tshepo Motsepe, First Lady of South Africa as the wife of Cyril Ramaphosa, the President of South Africa
- Naledi Pandor (née Matthews), South African politician and minister
- Dipuo Peters, South Africa politician, former Minister of Transport and Minister of Energy from 2009 to 2013
- Sebele I, former Chief (Kgosi) of the Kwena – a major Tswana tribe (morafe) in modern-day Botswana
- Molefi Sefularo, South African politician
- Abram Onkgopotse Tiro, South African student activist and black consciousness militant

=== Arts and media ===
- Khuli Chana, South African hip hop artist
- Kgomotso Christopher, South African actress and Voice-Over artist
- Presley Chweneyagae, South African actor. He starred in the film Tsotsi, which won the Academy Award for Foreign Language Film.
- Katlego Danke, South African actress
- Connie Ferguson, Botswana born South African actress
- Shona Ferguson, Botswana born South African businessman, actor, film producer and co-founder of Ferguson Films
- Charma Gal, singer, former Culture Spears member
- Goapele, American singer with Setswana ancestry
- Mpule Kwelagobe, former Miss Universe
- Afentse Fenny Lekolwane, Motswana filmmaker, director, and producer
- Gail Nkoane Mabalane, South African actress, model, media socialite, businesswoman and singer
- Motsi Mabuse, South African-German dancer
- Vee Mampeezy, Botswana musician
- Maps Maponyane, South African television presenter, actor, fashion designer, speaker, model, voice over artist, philanthropist and entrepreneur
- Hugh Masekela, South African jazz musician
- Bonang Matheba, South African media personality
- Tim Modise, South African journalist, TV and radio presenter
- Tumi Morake, South African comedian, actress, TV personality and writer. Current presenter of "Dirage" on Motsweding Fm.
- Cassper Nyovest, aka "Refiloe Maele Phoolo", South African hip hop artist
- Hip Hop Pantsula, South African artist
- Manaka Ranaka, South African actress
- Dolly Rathebe, musician and actress
- A-Reece, South African musician
- Rapulana Seiphemo, South African actor
- Tuks Senganga, aka "Tumelo Kepadisa", Setswana rapper
- DJ Fresh, Botswana born South African radio personality
- DJ Speedsta, Dj and TV personality
- Earl Sweatshirt, American rapper, son of Keorapetse Kgositsile
- Boity Thulo, South African actress, hip hop artist
- Redi Tlhabi, Journalist, producer, author and radio presenter
- Emma Wareus, former Miss World First Princess

=== Sports ===
- Itumeleng Khune, South African footballer
- Reneilwe Letsholonyane, South African footballer
- Gift Links, South African footballer
- Dikgang Mabalane, South African football player
- Innocent Maela, South African football player
- Marks Maponyane, retired South African football player
- Teko Modise, South African footballer
- Stephen Mokoka, South African long-distance runner
- Pitso Mosimane, South African football former player and coach. Current manager of Al Ahly in the Egyptian Premier League.
- Victor Mpitsang, South African cricketer, fast bowler who has played for South Africa, currently cricket National Convenor of Selectors
- Ox Nché, South African rugby player
- Kagiso Rabada, South African cricketer. He debuted for South Africa in November 2014 and by July 2018 he had topped both the ICC ODI bowler rankings and the ICC Test bowler rankings, aged 22.
- Jimmy Tau, former South African footballer
- Percy Tau, South African footballer
- Letsile Tebogo, Botswana sprinter
- Matthews Temane, South African Middle distance runner
- Baboloki Thebe, Commonwealth 800 metres silver medalist. 4x4 Commonwealth gold medalist.
- Alister Walker, Botswana professional squash player

=== Religion ===
- Frederick Samuel Modise, founder of the International Pentecostal Holiness Church
- Glayton Modise, the International Pentecostal Holiness Church leader

== Gallery ==
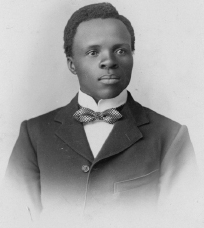
South African ANC activist, writer and author,

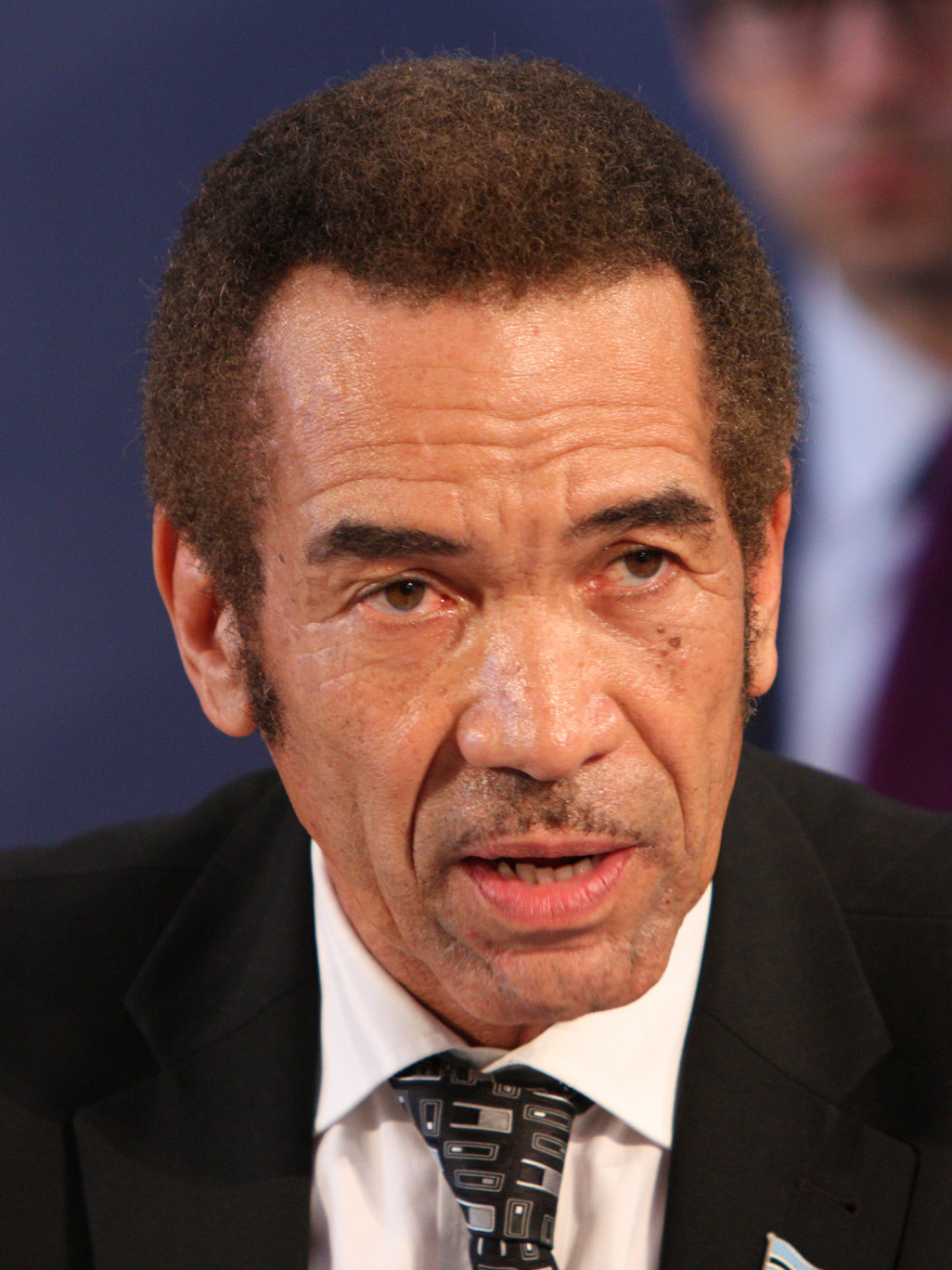
4th President of Botswana, King of Bamangwato (Khama IV)

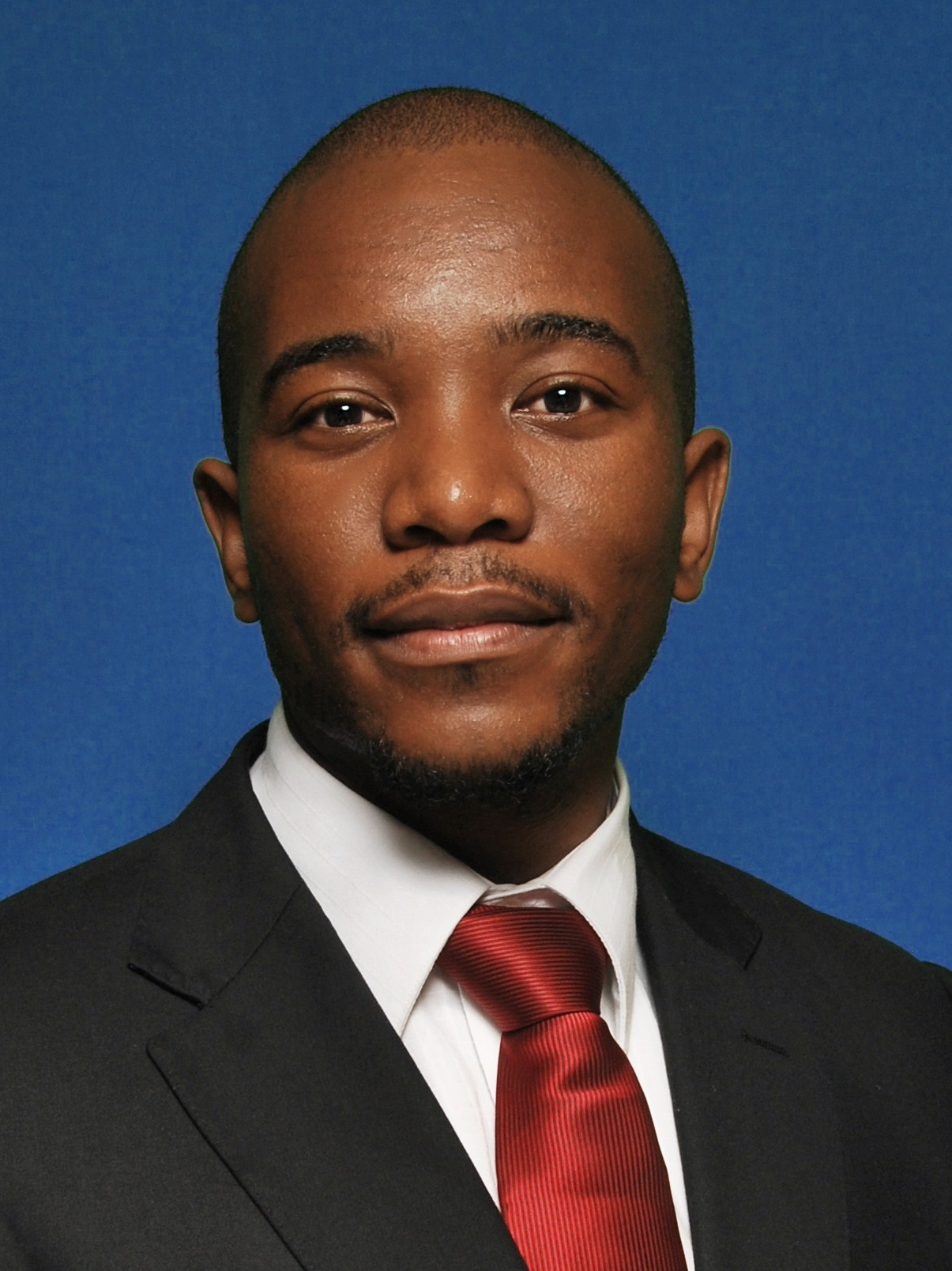
South African politician

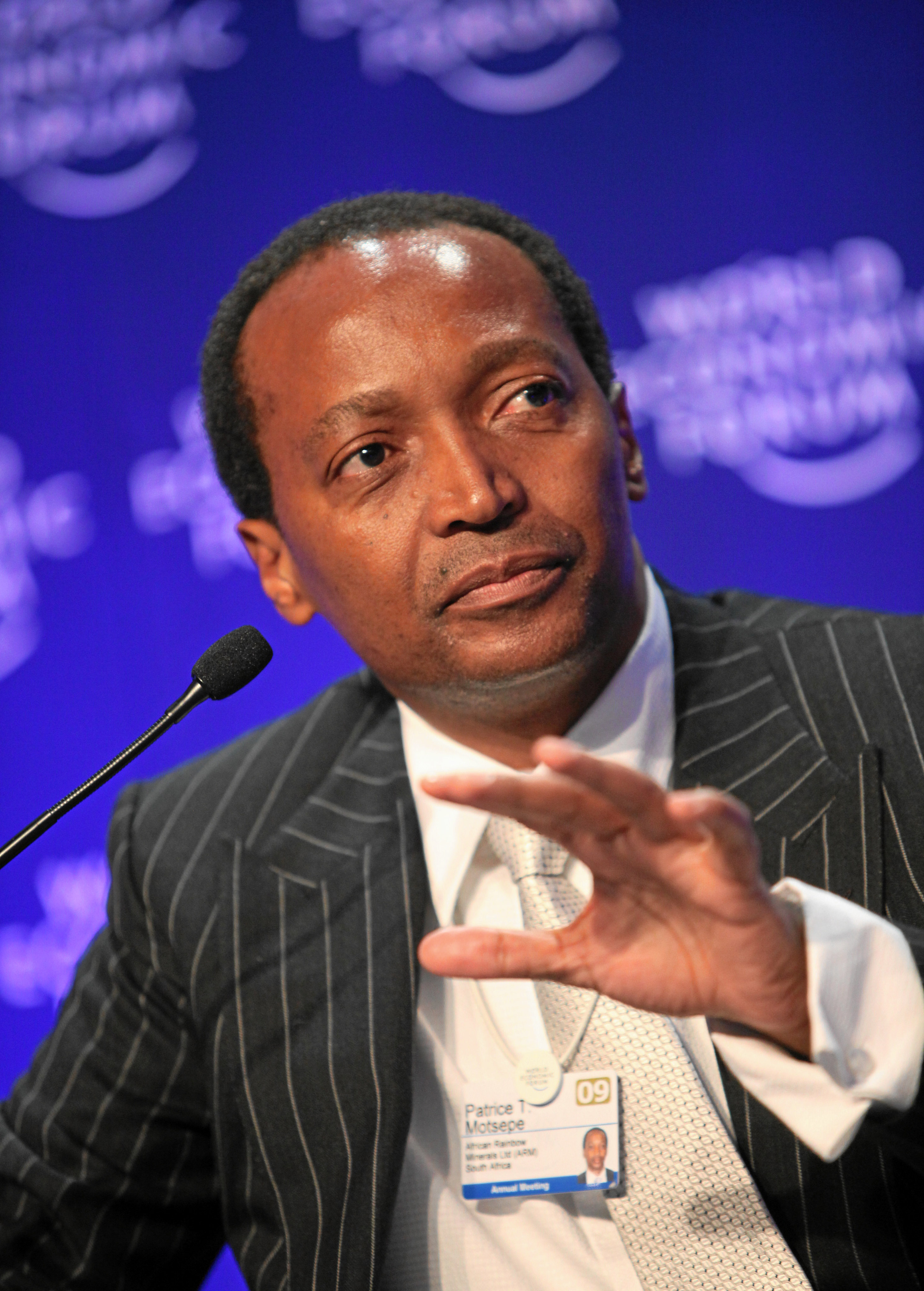
South African billionaire mining businessman, CAF President

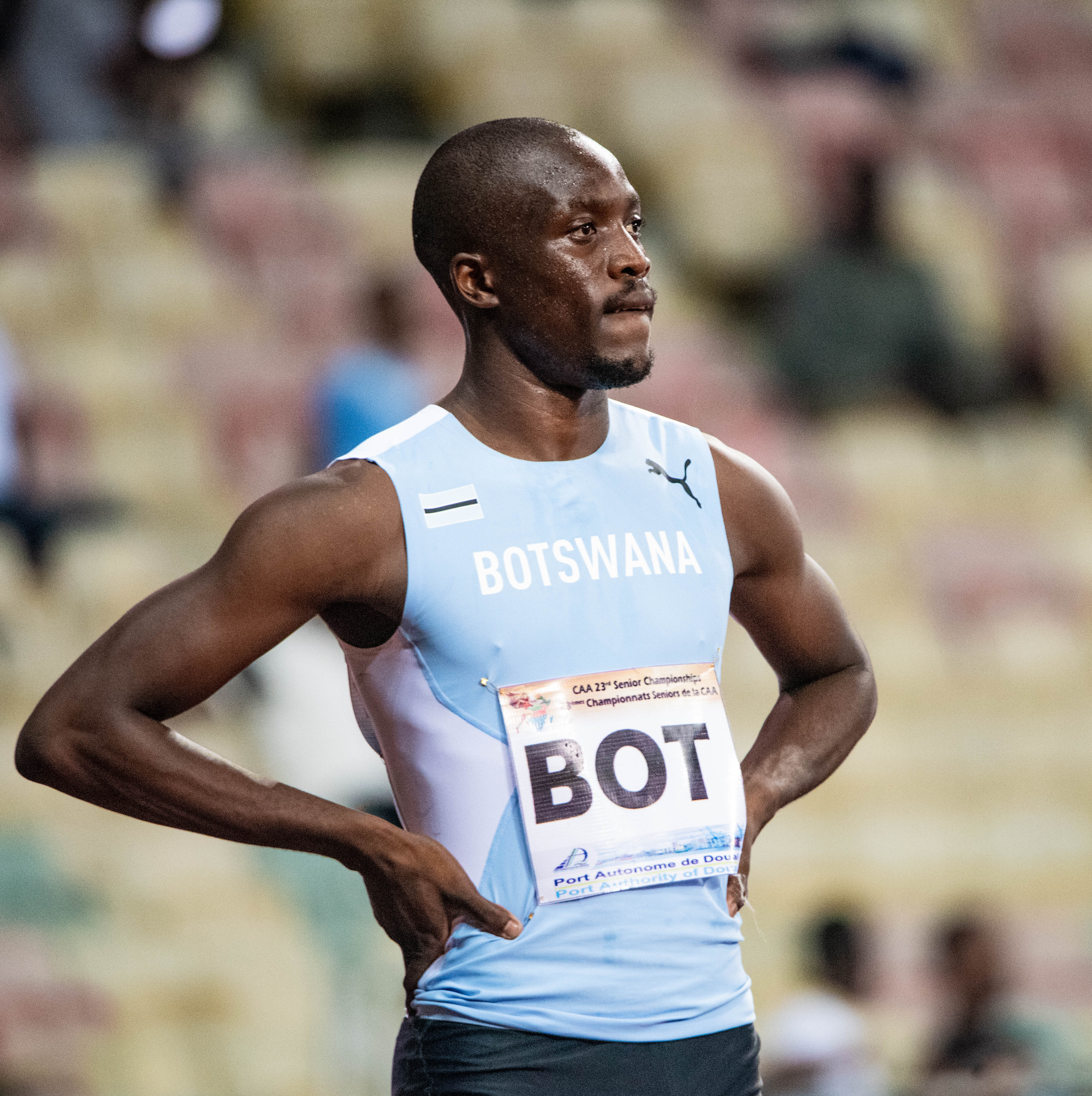
Tebogo Letsile, the 2024 Summer Olympics 200 metres gold medalist

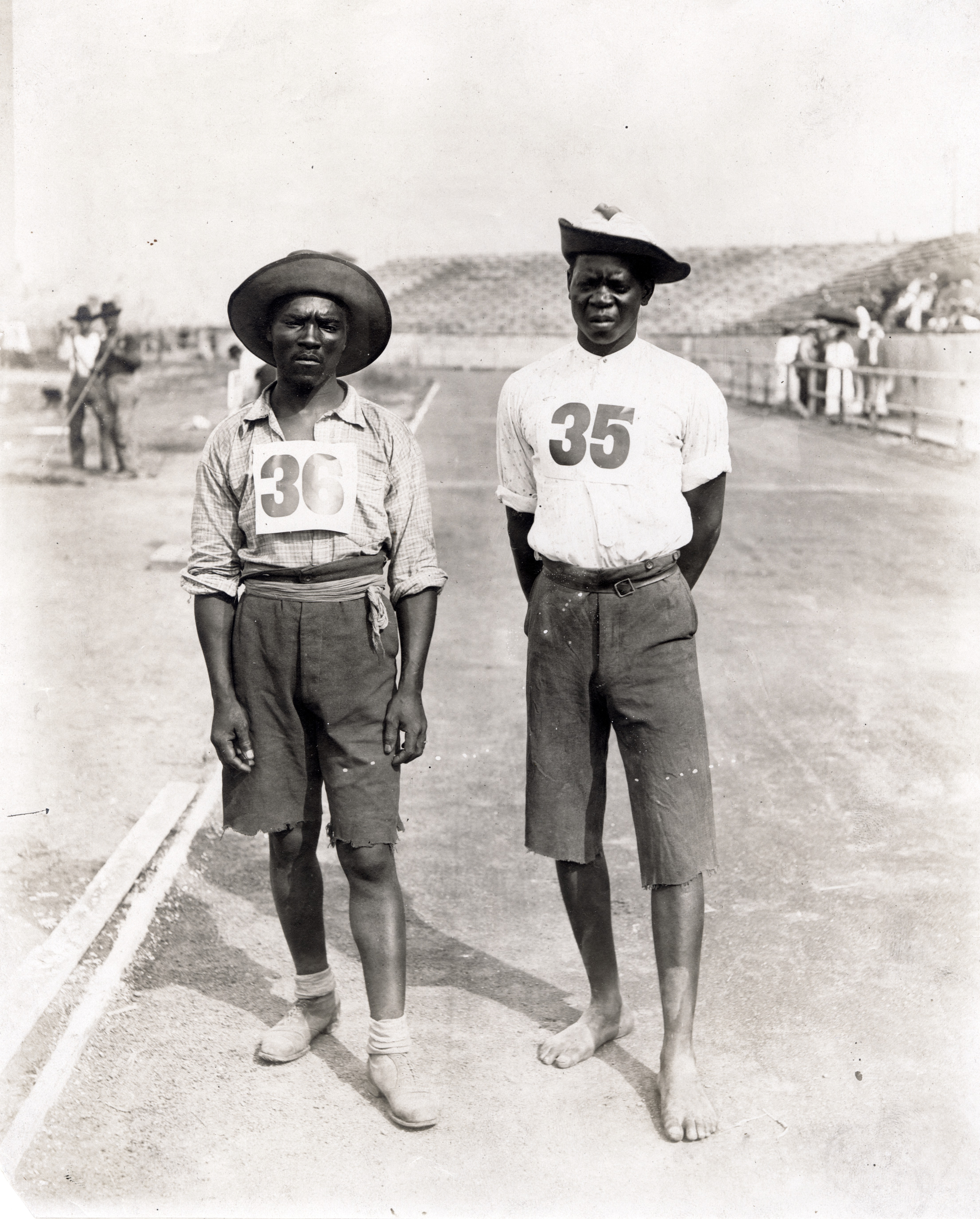
Tswana tribesmen, first Africans to compete at the Olympics

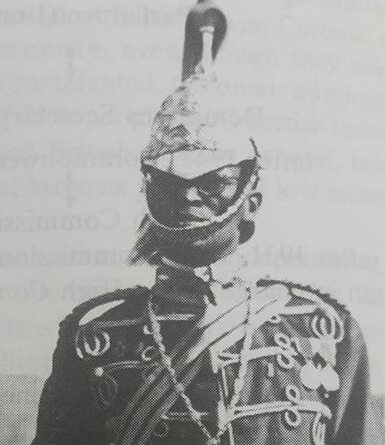
King Bathoen II 1947 of Bangwaketse

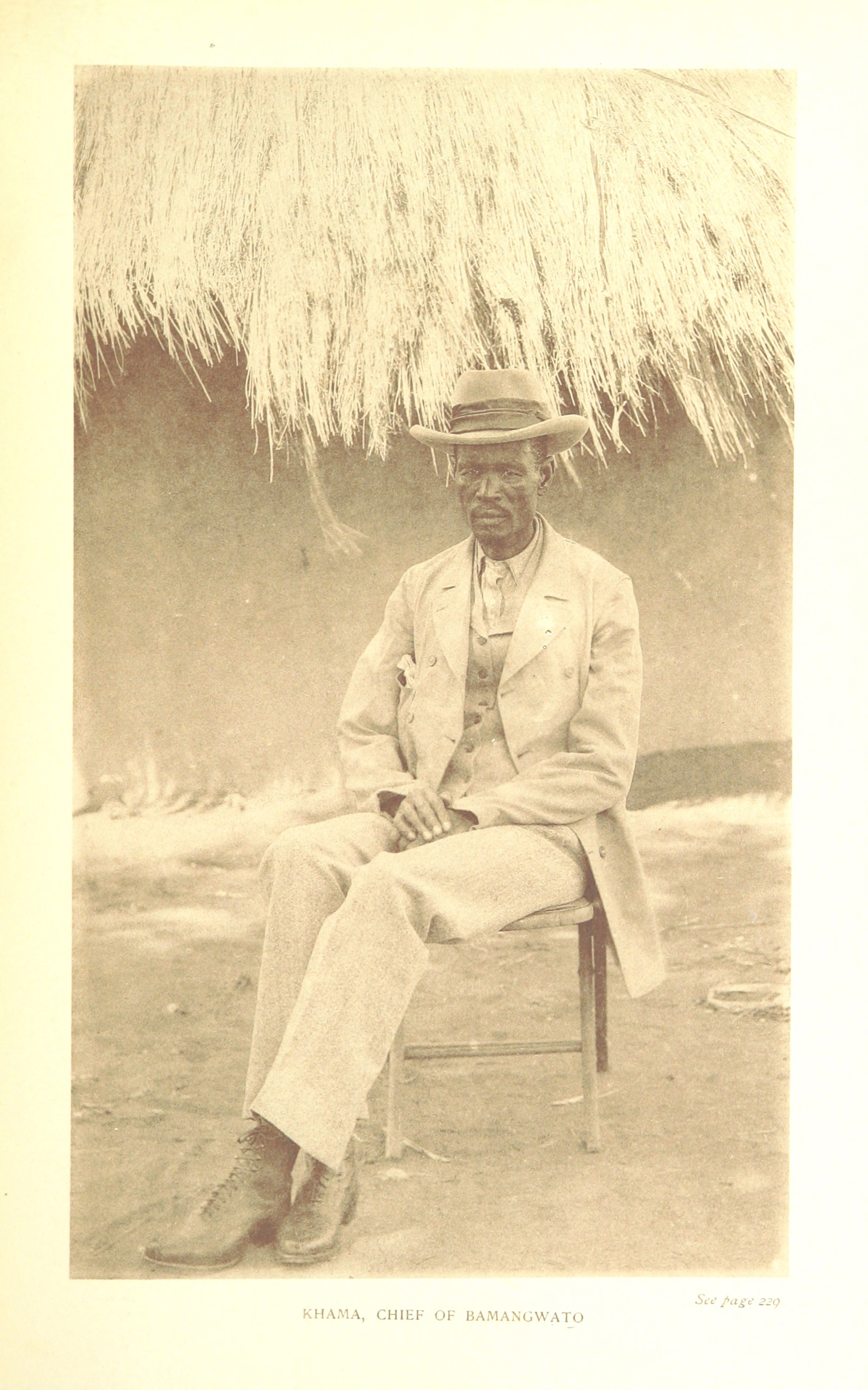
King Khama (III) of Bamangwato

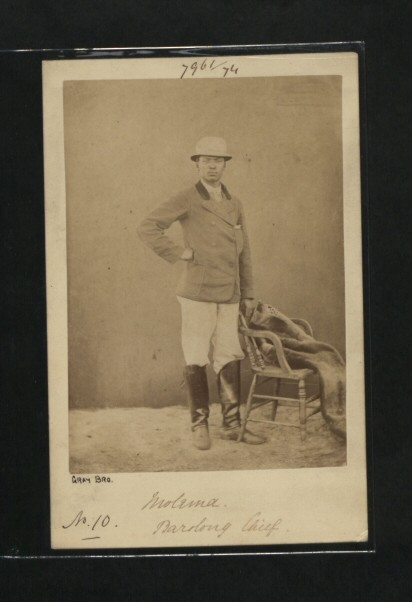
King Molema of Barolong

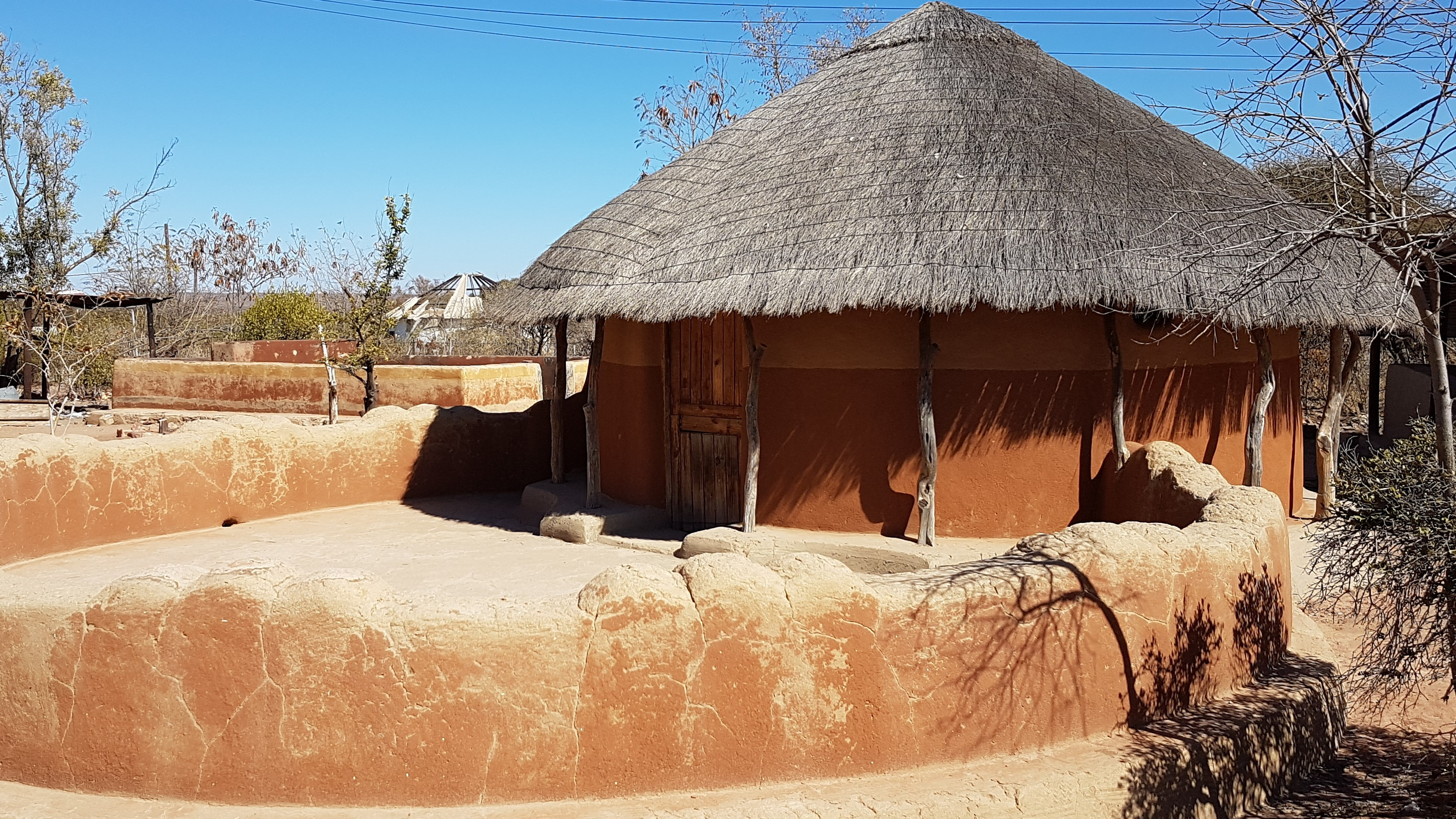
Setswana traditional house

== See also ==
- Sotho-Tswana peoples
- Demographics of Botswana
- Langeberg Rebellion (1896–97)
- Battle of Dimawe
