= Stadio Holdings =

South African private tertiary education holding company

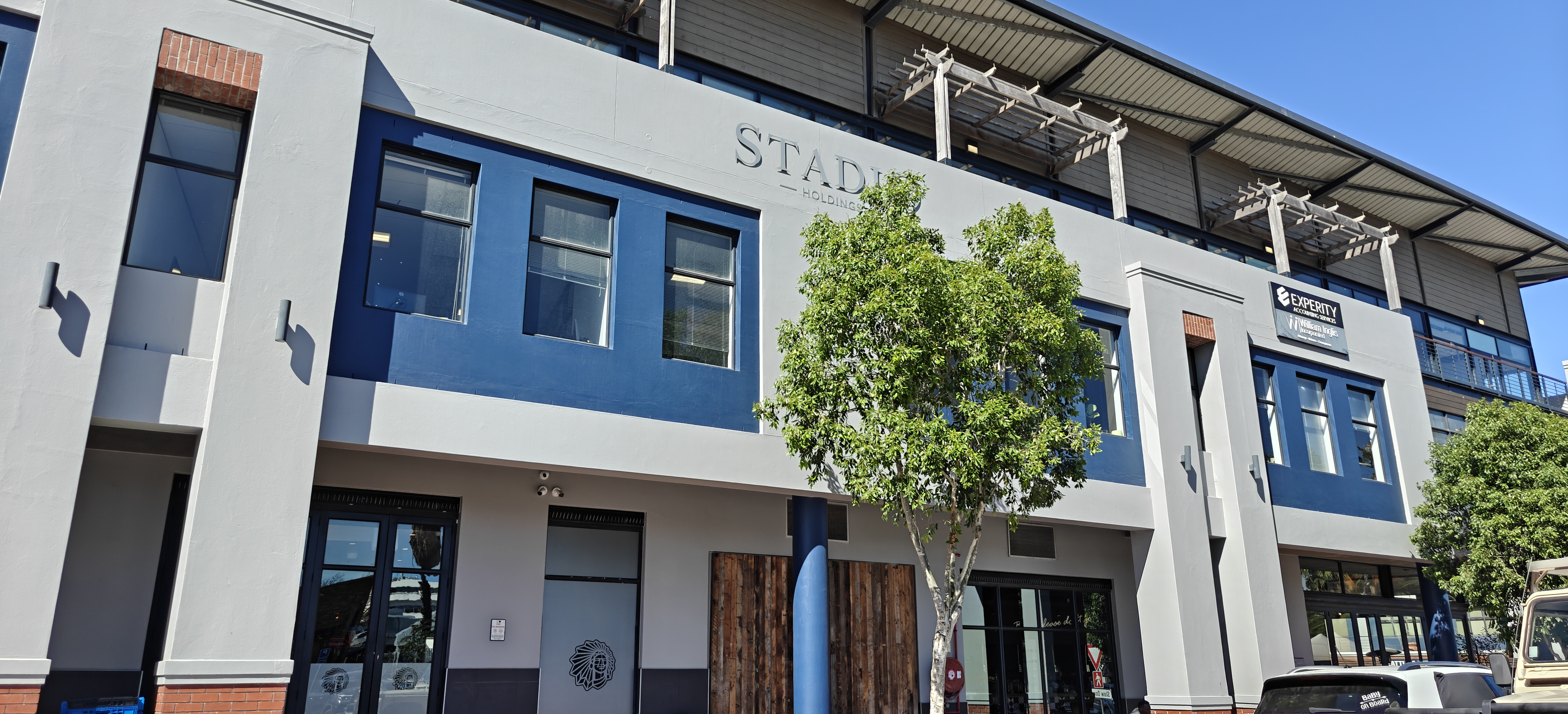
- The headquarters of Stadio Holdings, in Durbanville, Western Cape
- Type: Public holding company
- Traded as: JSE: SDO
- ISIN: ZAE000248662
- Industry: Education
- Founded: 2017; 9 years ago
- Headquarters: Durbanville, South Africa
- Key people: Divya Singh (Chief Academic Officer); Thabane Vincent Maphai (Chairperson); Stan du Plessis (CEO)
- Services: Tertiary education
- Revenue: ▲ R1.84 billion (2025)
- Operating income: ▲ R477 million (2025)
- Net income: ▲ R341 million (2025)
- Total assets: ▲ R2.67 billion (2025)
- Total equity: ▲ R2.14 billion (2025)
- Number of employees: 1,290 (2025)
- Subsidiaries: Stadio Higher Education (100%); AFDA (100%); Milpark (83.9%)
- Website: stadio.co.za

Stadio Holdings (stylized in caps) is a South African private tertiary education holding company, operating campuses across its three educational institutions.

Originally part of private education company Curro Holdings, Stadio was unbundled and incorporated in its own right in 2017. Stadio is headquartered in Durbanville, Western Cape, and is one of South Africa's 100 largest companies by market capitalization.

== History ==
Stadio was originally a subsidiary of private education group Curro Holdings, which was founded in 1998.

In 2013, Curro unbundled Stadio, to allow the latter to focus on tertiary education. Following this, Stadio listed on the JSE Limited on 3 October 2017.

In 2017, Stadio acquired a 100% shareholding in South African fashion design institution Lisof.

In 2019, Stadio announced its intention to acquire or launch its own IT and medical training facilities in South Africa.

In 2024, Stadio began construction on a new campus in Durbanville, Western Cape. The R370 million investment will comprise 13,000 sqm of buildings, and is set to accommodate up to 5,000 students from the 2026 academic year. The new campus opened in October 2025, with plans to offer 20 qualifications, and welcome its first students in February 2026.

In March 2026, the company announced its goal of reaching 80,000 students by 2030. The group also confirmed it would undertake construction projects to expand both its Durbanville and Centurion campuses.

== Operations ==
Stadio operates three educational institutions, STADIO Higher Education, AFDA, and Milpark, with the former being the largest.

As of 2024, when combining all three of its institutions, Stadio provides 90 programs across 16 campuses. These are at higher certificate, diploma, and degree levels, including honors, masters, and doctoral qualifications.

Total enrolment, as of March 2026, is 53,303 students, with distance learning accounting for 87% of enrolment.

=== Campuses ===
Stadio's campuses include:

- Stadio Cape Town (Durbanville and Bellville), Durban (Musgrave), Centurion, and Midrand
- Stadio distance learning George, Windhoek, Ongwediva, Polokwane, and Krugersdorp
- AFDA Cape Town, Durban, Gqeberha, and Johannesburg
- Milpark Cape Town

=== Graduates ===
For the 2024 academic year, Stadio Higher Education had 5,739 graduates (5,246 undergrad and 493 postgrad), Milpark had 2,378 (1,384 undergrad and 994 postgrad), and AFDA had 962 (830 undergrad and 132 postgrad). Thus, total figures for Stadio Holdings for the academic year were 9,079 graduates (7,460 undergrad and 1,619 postgrad).
