= Khanya Mkangisa =

South African actress

- Born: Khanya Mkangisa; 13 March 1988 (age 38); Peddie, South Africa
- Education: AFDA, The School for the Creative Economy
- Occupations: Actress, DJ artist, presenter
- Years active: 2003–present

Khanya Mkangisa (born 13 March 1988) is a South African actress. She is best known for her roles in series such as Isidingo, Shattered, Step Up to a Start Up and Harvest. She is also a television presenter and DJ. She is best known as a YoTv presenter during the early 2000's.

== Personal life ==
Khanya was born on the 13 March 1988 in Peddie, South Africa. She is a graduate of AFDA, The School for the Creative Economy.

She has been linked to rapper J Molly, who is 10 years younger than her. These rumors started in October 2019.

== Career ==
At the age of 14, she got her big break on television and became a YoTv presenter on Sabc1. After being on YoTv she moved onto an educational science show called Knock Knock. In 2004, she made an appearance on the series Mthunzini.Com and thereafter moved on to star in The Lab1 as 'Refilwe' and then onto Ugugu noAndile. She also presented a show called Shield Teen. She had supporting roles in popular tv shows namely Zone 14 in 2011 and Intersexions in 2012. In 2012, she acted in the BBC production Mad Dogs III as the character 'Anna'. In 2013 she joined the cast of the series Zabalaza as a regular and played the role of 'Mpilo'.

In 2019, she made her debut as a DJ and performed at the Jozi to Quilox weekend festival in Lagos, Nigeria. In 2020 she made her debut in the popular soapie Muvhango playing the role of 'Mbali'.

== Filmography ==
Year	Film	Role	Genre	Ref.
2012	Forced Love	Nonhle	TV series	
2014	Step Up to a Start Up	Joy Rammala	Film	
2015	Isidingo	Aphiwe Nzimande	TV series	
2016	Doubt	Lindiwe	TV series	
2017	Harvest		TV series	
2022	"Unmarried"		TV series	
