= Preshanthan Moodley =

- Born: 24 May 1988 (age 38)
- Citizenship: South Africa
- Occupations: Film director, Television director

Preshanthan Moodley (born 24 May 1988) is a South African film and television director, producer and writer.

== Life and career ==
Born in the small town of Richards Bay in South Africa, Moodley is the eldest of two children. After graduating high school in 2005, Moodley moved to Johannesburg to study film-making at AFDA, The South African School of Motion Picture Medium and Live Performance where he obtained his BA Honors degree. Hello Boy Productions was started by Moodley in 2007.

In 2008, whilst studying, Moodley directed the independent feature The Legend of the Killer Bride, which was distributed by NEXT Entertainment in South Africa as well as broadcast on television through DSTV. In 2009, he produced and directed two seasons of a South African celebrity talk Show titled Spill the Beans- over coffee. Guests included Isidingo actors, Sorisha Naidoo, Darren Maule, Jena Dover and many others. In 2010, Moodley produced South Africa's first Bollywood-style film titled Yeh Rishta, which is set to be distributed by Videovision Entertainment in 2013.

== Filmography ==
=== Director & Writer ===
- The Legend of the Killer Bride (2008)
- Spill the Beans - Over Coffee (2008–2009)
- Yeh Rishta (2010)
- The Return of the Killer Bride (production)

=== Director ===
- Zara (2014)

=== Producer ===
- The Legend of the Killer Bride (2008)
- Spill the Beans - Over Coffee (2009)
- Yeh Rishta (2010)
- The Return of the Killer Bride (production)

== Achievements ==
- Best Student TV Production (2008)
- Indian Cinema Centenary Award (2013)
