= AFDA, The School for the Creative Economy =

Film school in South Africa

Coordinates: 33°55′54″S 18°28′06″E

AFDA
- Motto: Sada tanisens gera kuru da
- Motto in English: Our actions create us
- Type: Private
- Established: 1994; 32 years ago
- Founders: Garth Holmes; Bata Passchier; Deon Opperman
- Parent institution: Stadio Holdings (100%)
- Dean: Jane-Anne Raath (Johannesburg); Leopold Senekal (Cape Town); Dr.Temara Prem (Durban); Simon Pienaar (Gqeberha); Pauli Van Dyk(Hatfield)
- Total staff: 180+ (2026)
- Students: 2,700+ (2026)
- Location: South Africa
- Campus: Urban
- Language: English
- Website: afda.co.za

AFDA is a South African private tertiary education institution that offers higher certificates, undergraduate degrees, and postgraduate degrees in film, television, performance, business innovation, technology, radio and podcasting, and creative writing.

It has five campuses located in Auckland Park, Johannesburg; Observatory, Cape Town; Durban North, Durban; and Gqeberha Campus, Central, Port Elizabeth, In 2026 a new campus opened in Hatfield, Pretoria.

== History ==
AFDA (an acronym for Africa Film Drama Art, which is no longer used) was founded in 1994 by Garth Holmes, Bata Passchier, and Deon Opperman. Its inaugural class at its Johannesburg school had five students.

In 2003, AFDA's second campus opened in Cape Town, followed by the Durban campus in 2012 and the Gqeberha campus in Eastern Cape in 2015. AFDA Botswana was established in 2015 at Oodi College Of Applied Arts And Technology (OCAAT), but has since closed.

In 2017, AFDA was acquired by tertiary education company, Stadio Investments (now Stadio Holdings), a then-wholly owned subsidiary of JSE-listed Curro Holdings. By then, the school had expanded to 2,000 full-time students, 3,500 alumni, five campuses (eventually scaled back to four), and nine fully accredited degrees.

As of 2026, AFDA has 2,700 students, over 8500 alumni, and a permanent staff of over 180 academics and administrators.

In November 2024 Diaan Lawrenson was appointed as CEO of AFDA. The former actress had been serving as Dean of AFDA Cape Town since 2019.

== Academics and Accreditation ==
AFDA offers 3 higher certificates, 4 undergraduate degrees and 4 postgraduate programs.

- Higher Certificate in Film, Television and Entertainment Production
- Higher Certificate in Performing Arts
- Higher Certificate in Radio and Podcasting
- Bachelor of Arts (BA) in Motion Picture Medium
- Bachelor of Arts (BA) in Live Performance
- Bachelor of Commerce (Bcom) in Business Innovation and Entrepreneurship
- Bachelor of Creative Writing
- BA Honours in Motion Picture Medium
- BA Honours in Live Performance
- Postgraduate Diploma in Innovation
- Master of Fine Arts in Motion Picture Medium (MFA)

AFDA is fully accredited by the Council on Higher Education (CHE), Department of Education (DoE) and the South African Qualifications Authority (SAQA), and is a full member of CILECT (The International Association of Film and Television Schools).

== Awards and Distinctions ==
In 2021, 2022, and 2023 AFDA was ranked among the top 5 most innovative South African educational institutions in the creative brand space in The Loeries Official Rankings.

AFDA has won the Best Student Film award at the South African Film and Television Awards 10 times, with Anguish, a 2023 graduation film from AFDA Johannesburg, taking home the award at the SAFTAS 2024 awards.

At the 33rd 2006 annual Student Academy Awards (SAA) presented by the Academy of Motion Pictures Arts and Sciences, the AFDA production Elalini, directed by Tristan Holmes, won the Foreign Film Award, making AFDA the only African film to have won the award.

The 2021 SAA Narrative Gold winner, Lakutshon’ IIanga” (When the Sun Sets) by South African Phumi Morare of Chapman University (USA) was filmed in South Africa and produced in association with AFDA.

96 SAFTA Awards

32 Simon Sabela Awards

42 SASC Visual Spectrum Awards

8 Durban International Film Festival awards

10 SAMA Awards

6 Loeries

5 Fleur du Cap awards

4 Jozi Film Festival awards

4 Naledi awards

2 Metro FM Awards

3 Standard Bank Ovation awards

== Notable alumni ==
- Michelle Allen – actor, singer / songwriter
- Keenan Arrison - actor and singer
- Jenna Bass - film director
- Munya Chidzonga – Zimbabwean actor, filmmaker, entrepreneur
- Shahir Chundra – actor and filmmaker
- Christopher-Lee Dos Santos – director
- Vuyo Dabula – actor
- Nosipho Dumisa – director and screenwriter
- Daniel Etim-Effiong — Nigerian actor, scriptwriter and director
- Leroy Gopal – actor and comedian
- Daryne Joshua – filmmaker
- Jonathan Liebesman – director
- Eric Macheru – actor
- Thabo Malema — actor
- Noxolo Mathula — actress
- Khanya Mkangisa – actress
- Shoka Mokgapa — actress
- Thapelo Mokoena – actor
- Preshanthan Moodley – director, producer, writer
- Jamie D. Ramsay – cinematographer
- Riky Rick – musician
- Shekhinah (singer) – singer
- Chioma Umeala – actress
- Ofentse Mwase – Cinematographer, Director and Comedian
- Mapula Mafole – actress
