= Glayton Modise =

Former leader of a South African Pentecostal church

The Comforter Reverend Glayton M. Modise
- Born: Glayton Modise; August 13, 1940
- Died: February 9, 2016 (aged 75); Johannesburg, South Africa
- Years active: 1998–2016
- Spouses: Miriam Modise. Nozipho Pearl Modise
- Parent(s): Frederick Samuel Modise; Bertha Modise
- Religion: Pentecostal Christianity
- Church: International Pentecostal Holiness Church
- Ordained: 3 October 1998
- Title: His Grace, Comforter, Priest in Chief

Glayton M. Modise (13 August 1940–9 February 2016) was the leader of one of Africa's mega churches, the International Pentecostal Holiness Church. Glayton was the only son of Frederick Samuel Modise (1914–1998) who founded the IPHC in 1962. After his father died in 1998, Glayton took over the church until his death on 9 February 2016.

In 2005, Glayton M. Modise of served as a co-consecrator in the ordination of Dr. A. Louise Bonaparte of the USA, elevating her to the distinguished office of Archbishop.

== Early life ==
Modise was born in Soweto, South Africa and initially was under the Zion Christian Church where his father was a minister. After his father received his calling in 1962 to start preaching the Gospel, Modise was one of the people who oversaw some of the smaller branches and the growth of the church. After his father died in 1998, the church grew exponentially.

== Beliefs ==
Modise happened to have seen a vision from God, who instructed him to purchase a hill in Cape Town, South Africa and rename the hill Mount Zion. The hill, which was known as Blaauwberg Hill, was purchased for R100 million and was renamed Mount Zion. Glayton also continued his father's legacy of having a bursary scheme; the bursary scheme was known as FS Modise bursary scheme but was later renamed to FS Modise MG bursary scheme.
