= Milpark Education =

South African private tertiary education institution

- Type: Private
- Established: 1997; 29 years ago
- Parent institution: Stadio Holdings (83.9%)
- Students: 3,000+
- Location: Cape Town, South Africa, Republic of South Africa
- Campus: Urban
- Language: English
- Website: milpark.ac.za

Milpark Education is a South African private tertiary education institution. Established in 1997, Milpark is based in Cape Town.

The institution comprises four schools: the Business School, the School of Professional Accounting (incorporating CA Connect), the School of Financial Services, and the School of Commerce. It offers online higher education in three formats: Distance Learning, Distance Learning Online, and Online Short Courses.

Graduates receive qualifications that start at NQF level 5 and progress to NQF level 10. The qualifications are accredited by the South African Qualifications Authority.

Milpark is a subsidiary of Stadio Holdings, a private tertiary education holding company listed on the JSE Limited.

== Accreditations, affiliations, and partnerships ==
Milpark Education (Pty) Ltd is registered as a Private Higher Education Institution with the South African Department of Higher Education and Training under the Higher Education Act, 1997.

Milpark Education’s schools are also accredited by relevant professional organisations. Milpark Business School’s MBA is accredited by the Association of MBAs (AMBA); Milpark School of Financial Services is accredited by the Insurance Institute of South Africa (IISA), the Financial Planning Institute of Southern Africa (FPI), and the International Certifications for Business (ICB); The School of Commerce is accredited by the South African Board of People Practices (SABPP); and the Postgraduate Diploma in Accounting (PGDA) programme in the Milpark School of Professional Accounting (incorporating CA Connect) is accredited by the South African Institute of Chartered Accountants (SAICA).

== Ways to study ==
Milpark’s primary method for the delivery of education is online learning. Students have the option of Distance Learning, Distance Learning Online, and Online Short Courses.

== Student Bursaries ==
Milpark Education offers a number of bursaries to students annually, based on need and academic performance. However, the Milpark bursary programme is not available for the Postgraduate Diploma in Accounting (PGDA/CTA) and Advanced Accounting (Bridging Short Course to PGDA / CTA).
