= Curro Holdings =

South African private education holding company

Curro Holdings Limited
- Type: Public holding company
- Traded as: JSE: COH
- Industry: Education
- Founded: 1998; 28 years ago
- Founders: Thys Franken; Eddie Conradie Snr. Chris van der Merwe; Eduard Ungerer
- Headquarters: Bellville, Western Cape, South Africa
- Area served: South Africa
- Key people: Themba Baloyi (Non-executive director); Cobus Loubser (CEO)
- Services: Private education
- Revenue: ▲ R5.09 billion (2024)
- Operating income: ▲ R161 million (2024)
- Net income: ▲ R97 million (2024)
- Total assets: ▲ R12.32 billion (2024)
- Total equity: ▲ R7.2 billion (2024)
- Subsidiaries: Curro Schools; Curro Preschools; Curro Online; Curro DigiEd Schools; Meridian Schools
- Website: curro.co.za

Curro Holdings Limited, often referred to simply as Curro, is a South African educational holding company, with private schools across all nine South African provinces.

Founded in 1998, Curro is headquartered in Bellville, Western Cape, and is listed on the JSE Limited, with a 2025 market capitalization of around R5 billion.

As of 2025, Curro operates a total of 189 schools across 81 campuses. In the same year, enrolment across all of Curro's schools totaled over 73,000.

== History ==
Curro was founded in 1998, by then-teacher Chris van der Merwe, and initially operated in leased premises with a total of 28 students. The first Curro school campus was established a year later, in Durbanville, Western Cape. Van der Merwe stated that he founded the school to create affordable private education in South Africa.

Despite having no formal business training, van der Merwe managed Curro's financial planning and business model during its early years, while his business partners focused on academic matters.

By 2006, Curro's total enrolment had reached around 1,000 students, and a second campus was built, in Langebaan. Silver Lakes and Roodeplaat schools followed.

In 2011, Paladin Capital, a subsidiary of PSG Konsult, bought a 50% shareholding in Curro. Curro's leadership began working with Jannie Mouton, founder of PSG Group, which brought in a team of chartered accountants to Curro, to share business insights.

In June 2011, when Curro Holdings was listed on the Alternative Exchange (AltX) of the Johannesburg Stock Exchange, the company stated that its goal was to have 40 schools and an enrollment of 45,000 by 2020. At the time, Curro had a market capitalization of R400 million.

In 2013, Curro moved into the tertiary education environment and acquired Embury, a private teacher education institution.

In 2017, Stadio, a former subsidiary of Curro, was unbundled and incorporated as its own entity, focused on tertiary education. It listed on the JSE Limited as Stadio Holdings, and Curro founder Chris van der Merwe agreed to run the new entity for three years, at PSG Group's request.

Curro Online was launched in 2020, in response to Covid 19.

As of February 2025, Curro’s enrollment numbers were just over 72,000.

== Operations ==
Curro operates the following educational divisions:

- Curro Castles (nursery schools)
- Curro schools
- Curro Academy schools
- Curro Select schools
- Curro assisted-learning schools
- Curro DigiEd schools
- Curro private colleges
- Curro Online
- Meridian schools

As of 2025, Curro operates a total of 189 schools, located on 81 different campuses.

== Controversy ==
In 2015, the Gauteng Department of Education found that a Curro School was segregating classes based on race.
