= Zuurbekom =

- Location within Gauteng Location within South Africa
- Coordinates: 26.3000°S 27.7833°E
- Country: South Africa
- Province: Gauteng
- District: West Rand
- Municipality: Rand West City

Population
  - Total: 3,449
- Time zone: UTC+2 (SAST)
- Area code: 011

Zuurbekom is a town in the Gauteng province, South Africa. It is mainly earmarked for agricultural purposes. The International Pentecost Holiness Church (IPHC) has its headquarters here.
