= Botswood =

Film and television company in Botswana

Botswood Studios is a film and television production entity based in Botswana, founded in 2015 by Lawrence Lekolwane and Afentse Fenny Lekolwane. The founders have acknowledged that the trademark is inspired by Nollywood films and storytelling styles. While often referred to as a production company, Botswood positions itself as a creative brand focused on producing film and television content within Botswana and beyond.

The organisation is involved in the production of short films, feature films, television content and digital media. It also provides production services and facilities to support film and media projects in the region. Botswood has produced a range of short and feature films such as Matsale, Ya le nna Nigeria and Beauty Comedy and has also been involved in television production, producing 156 episodes of the television series named Botshelo Jo, which airs on Botswana Television.

It's other work includes commissioned productions and collaborations with other African content creators. Alongside production activities, the organisation runs annual kiddies acting masterclasses aimed at introducing young participants to filmmaking.
