= Frederick Samuel Modise =

Former leader of a South African Pentecostal church

The Comforter Reverend Frederick Samuel Modise
- Born: Frederick Samuel Modise; March 14, 1914; Lebotloane
- Died: September 21, 1998 (aged 84); Johannesburg, South Africa
- Years active: 1962–1998 Frederick Samuel Modise
- Religion: Pentecostal Christianity
- Church: International Pentecostal Holiness Church
- Title: His Grace, Comforter, Moemedi

Frederick Samuel Modise (14 March 1914 – 21 September 1998) was a South African church leader and founder of the International Pentecost Holiness Church (IPHC).

== Early life ==
Modise was born in Rooiberg, Limpopo, South Africa, near the present town of Bela-Bela, on 14 March 1914. Black residents of Rooiberg were forcibly moved from their birthplace to make way for the mining and farming interests of white people, and relocated to settlements of Lebotlwane and others, which were later incorporated into Bophuthatswana, a former Bantustan. Modise grew up in Lebotlwane, near Hammanskraal, which was and continues to be inhabited mainly by the Tswana tribe. As an adult, Modise started his own business in the carpentry and funeral industries.

In middle age, Modise suffered a stomach ailment, his equipment was stolen, and he went bankrupt. Additionally, Modise's children died. Modise states he went to various prophets and healers within the Church, and to various seers and medicine men, without being healed.

In 1962, Modise was admitted to Coronation Hospital in Johannesburg. He then later that year heard a voice that spoke to him and told him to pray. After confessing his sins, he was given instructions by God on how to "pray spiritually". After being told by a voice to get up from his bed and that "[God] is discharging you from ... hospital", he proceeded to 'spiritually heal' fifteen people in the hospital before being discharged.

== Founding of the IPHC ==
The International Pentecost Holiness Church (IPHC) was founded in Meadowlands by Modise in 1962. This would mark the largest schism in the Zion Christian Church since 1948.

He built a church and began praying for the sick. Many claimed they had been healed by Modise. In 1970, he moved the church headquarters to Oskraal, outside Pretoria. A large local church, called Jerusalem was built.

In May 1991, South African President FW de Klerk inaugurated the church's new headquarters Silo, in Zuurbekom, west of Johannesburg. After 35 years in ministry, Modise died in 1998; survived by his spouse Bertha Modise, and his two daughters.

== Bibliography ==
- Anderson, Allan H. (2001). African reformation : African initiated christianity in the 20th century. Africa World Press. ISBN 0-86543-884-6. OCLC 876545499.
- Anderson, Allan H. (1992) African Pentecostalism in a South African urban environment: a missiological evaluation'. D Th thesis, University of South Africa, Pretoria.
- Anderson, Allan H. (1992) Bazalwane: African Pentecostals in South Africa. Pretoria: University of South Africa Press.
- Daneel, M. L. (1974) Old and new in Southern Shona independent churches: Vol II. The Hague: Mouton.
