= International Pentecostal Holiness Church (Africa) =

African-initiated church in South Africa

The International Pentecost Holiness Church (or IPHC) is the largest African-initiated church in South Africa. The church was founded in Meadowlands, Soweto, in 1962 by Frederick S Modise. The church's headquarters is now at Silo Ntlokgolo in Zuurbekom; visitors were encouraged to make a monthly pilgrimage to Silo.

== Infighting ==
When IPHC’s founder and leader, Frederick Samuel Modise, died on 21 September 1998, his only son, Glayton Modise, then took over leadership of the wealthy mega-church until his death on 9 February 2016. Glayton left an intestate will of about R400 million in luxury cars, properties, investments, and cash, and Michael Sandlana, reportedly Modise's son out of wedlock, took over the reins of the church and was appointed IPHC church leader. Glayton’s two sons, Tshepiso Modise and Leonard Modise, and others in the church have been battling it out for control of the church ever since then.

On 11 July 2020, five people died when faction church members attacked each other, prompting the Commission for the Promotion and Protection of the Rights of Cultural, Religious, and Linguistic Communities (CRL Rights Commission) to intervene. Police arrested more than 40 suspects on the day, including six people who were taken to hospital. Among those arrested were police officers, soldiers, metro police, and Correctional Services Department members. More than 34 firearms, including five rifles, 16 shotguns, and 13 pistols, were also seized.

The commission found that four groups in the church are fighting for control of the assets and that the lack of a clear succession plan in the church is one of the main contributing factors of the conflict.

=== Arrests ===
In November 2025, Portia Phahlane, her son Kagiso, Vusi Ndala and Michael Sandlana, the leader of one faction of the International Pentecostal Holiness Church, appeared at the Pretoria specialized commercial crimes court on charges of corruption and money laundering. Portia Phahlane, the Pretoria High Court judge, was accused of accepting a bribe to make a favorable ruling in a long-standing church succession battle. According to the National Prosecuting Authority, between 2021 and 2022 payments amounting to about R2.4 million were allegedly made to Judge Phahlane.
