= Sepulana =

Bantu language spoken in Mpumalanga

- Region: Bushbuckridge, Mpumalanga, South Africa
- Ethnicity: Mapulana people
- Native speakers: Approximately 800,000 (2022 estimate)
- Language family: Niger–Congo?: Atlantic–Congo; Volta-Congo; Benue–Congo; Bantoid; Southern Bantoid; Bantu; Southern Bantu; Sotho–Tswana (S.30); Sepulana

Language codes
- ISO 639-3: –
- Glottolog: pula1264 Pulana
- Map of Mpumalanga with Bushbuckridge highlighted

Sepulana (also sePulane) is the language of the Mapulana people, a low-veld ethnic group primarily located in the Bushbuckridge area, which spans the northeastern Mpumalanga and southeastern Limpopo provinces of South Africa. The language is spoken by an estimated 800,000 people.

Sepulana is classified within the Bantu language family, specifically as part of the Sotho-Tswana group, and is considered an Eastern Sotho language, alongside Pai and Kutswe. Historically, Sepulana has been incorrectly regarded as a dialect of Northern Sotho (Sesotho sa Leboa) or Sepedi, a perception stemming from its geographical proximity to the Bapedi people, despite clear linguistic distinctions. This historical miscategorisation has implications for its current status. Sepulana exists predominantly in an unwritten form and is not formally taught in schools. Despite its non-official status, significant community-led efforts are underway for its documentation, revitalisation, and official recognition.

== Linguistic classification ==
Sepulana's linguistic classification places it firmly within the broader Bantu language family. It belongs to the Sotho-Tswana group, which corresponds to the S.30 label in Guthrie's 1967–71 classification of Bantu languages. This group encompasses closely related languages such as Setswana, Northern Sotho, Southern Sotho, and Lozi.

Within the Sotho-Tswana group, linguists classify Sepulana as part of the Eastern Sotho varieties, alongside Pai and Kutswe. These Eastern Sotho varieties are often considered more divergent from the core Northern Sotho dialects. Maho (2002) notably left the "East Sotho" varieties of Kutswe, Pai, and Pulana unclassified within Sotho-Tswana, further emphasizing their distinctiveness from other Sotho-Tswana languages.

A significant aspect of Sepulana's linguistic identity is its distinction from Northern Sotho and Sepedi. While it shares some similarities with Sepedi (Northern Sotho), Sepulana is explicitly stated not to be a dialect of Sepedi (Sesotho Sa Leboa). Northern Sotho functions as an umbrella term for a collection of related dialects, with Sepedi being the specific dialect spoken by the Pedi people. The written form of Northern Sotho was largely based on the Sepedi dialect, developed by missionaries in 1860. This historical standardisation process led to "Sepedi" being used as a broader term for the entire language family, even though it is technically just one dialect.

The historical classification of Sepulana as a mere dialect, particularly during the apartheid era, was a political decision rather than a purely linguistic one, contributing to ongoing debates about its status. This historical imposition has fueled the Mapulana people's ongoing efforts to gain recognition for their language as a sovereign official tongue. The Pan South African Language Board (PanSALB) conducted a survey in 2017 to address the controversy surrounding the names Sepedi and Sesotho sa Leboa, finding that a majority of respondents preferred Sesotho sa Leboa, indicating a broader dissatisfaction with the imposed Sepedi label. This situation underscores the complex interplay between linguistic classification, historical power dynamics, and cultural identity in South Africa.

== Geographic distribution and demographics ==
Sepulana is primarily spoken in the Bushbuckridge area, a low-veld region situated near the border of Mpumalanga and Limpopo provinces in South Africa. This area is also known as Mapulaneng, a name that holds deep cultural significance as it directly translates from the Sepulana language to mean "Place of the Mapulana people". This direct linguistic link between the place name "Mapulaneng" and the "Mapulana people" and their language "Sepulana" signifies a profound, inherent connection between the community, their ancestral land, and their linguistic identity. The town of Bushbuckridge itself originated around a trading store established in 1884 and was named for the abundant bushbuck herds and a prominent ridge in the 1880s.

The Mapulana people are a distinct ethnic group, and their language, Sepulana, is a central component of their cultural identity. The estimated number of native Sepulana speakers is approximately 800,000. The Bushbuckridge Local Municipality serves as the administrative center for this region, which is home to a significant population of Mapulana speakers. The substantial number of speakers, coupled with the language's non-official status, highlights a notable discrepancy in formal recognition for this linguistic community.

== Current status and influences ==
Sepulana currently exists predominantly in an unwritten form and is not taught in schools. This unwritten status is a consequence of its historical marginalisation, particularly during the apartheid era when it was classified as a mere dialect rather than a distinct language.

Due to its geographical location and the socio-economic interactions of its speakers, Sepulana has been influenced by several other languages. These influences include neighboring indigenous languages such as Swati and Xitsonga (Tsonga). The oral history of the Mapulana people also recounts historical conflicts with Swazis and Shangaans, indicating long-standing interactions that would naturally lead to linguistic exchange. More dominant South African languages, including English and Afrikaans, have also exerted influence. Furthermore, other Sotho-Tswana languages like Sepedi, Setswana, and Southern Sotho (Sesotho) have made inroads into Sepulana. Children in the region often acquire English, Afrikaans, and Sepedi at school, while migrant workers returning home introduce words and phrases from Setswana, Sesotho, and Afrikaans.

Despite these influences and the pervasive presence of other languages, Sepulana has retained its unique vocabulary and linguistic features, distinguishing it from other Sotho languages. However, the absence of a standardized written form and formal education, coupled with the pervasive influence of other languages and the active discouragement of Sepulana in educational settings, collectively pose a significant threat to the language's vitality. Studies indicate that the use of Sepulana by first-language speakers can negatively impact their learning of Sepedi, the standardised language taught in schools. Subject advisors have actively discouraged the use of Sepulana in classrooms, asserting that only Sepedi, as the official language, should be used, and often dismissing Sepulana as "not a language but a dialect". This perspective has been criticized for its bias and for disregarding the principle that all language varieties can be promoted and developed. Within the Mapulana community, some sub-dialects, such as HiPaye (spoken by the Mambayi subgroup), are facing extinction, with very few speakers remaining. This decline reflects the broader challenges to language transmission and survival.

== Orthography and phonology ==
Currently, Sepulana exists primarily in an unwritten form, meaning there is no widely adopted or standardized writing system for the language. The existing written form for Northern Sotho, with which Sepulana is sometimes erroneously associated, was standardized using the Latin alphabet. This orthography was developed by missionaries in 1860, largely based on the Sepedi dialect, and employs specific conventions for sounds, such as 'š' for the [ʃ] sound and circumflex accents to distinguish certain vowel sounds.

In response to the need for a more linguistically efficient writing system for highly agglutinative Southern African languages, including Eastern Sotho languages like Sepulana that currently lack standardized Latin orthographies, a new ideographic writing system called Ditema tsa Dinoko has been developed. The emergence of Ditema tsa Dinoko, an ideographic writing system specifically designed for Eastern Sotho languages such as Sepulana, represents a proactive, community-aligned initiative to address the historical absence of a written form for these languages. This system aims to remedy the "slowness in reading" often associated with the numerous multigraphs used in Latin scripts for these languages. Ditema tsa Dinoko is characterized as a syllabary, where individual graphemes representing consonants, vowels, and featural elements are combined into syllabic blocks known as amabheqe. The positioning of consonant graphemes within this system often corresponds to their place of articulation (e.g., labials at the apex, alveolars across the middle). It also incorporates specific markers for articulatory mode, such as Uphimbo (a voicing line), Lerothodi (a glottal action dot), and Ingungwana (a nasalization marker).

Like other Bantu languages, Sepulana is expected to exhibit agglutinative morphology, meaning it uses numerous affixes and derivational/inflectional rules to construct complete words. Bantu languages typically feature complex noun class and concord systems. Northern Sotho, for instance, is a non-articled language. Academic studies on the core vocabulary and morphological structures, such as compound words, in Sepedi provide insights into the grammatical characteristics shared across related Sotho-Tswana languages.

== Documentation and revitalization efforts ==
Significant community-led initiatives and partnerships are actively engaged in documenting, preserving, and promoting the Sepulana language, aiming to counteract its historical marginalization.

A pivotal organization in these efforts is the Mapulaneng Writers' Association (MWA). The MWA serves as an advocacy and lobby group dedicated to Mapulana culture, history, and language. In a notable step towards establishing a written literary tradition for Sepulana, the MWA introduced and launched six newly published novels written in the language in 2019. Members of the MWA, including prominent language activist Gakwi Mashego, have also contributed to the language's written presence by publishing newspaper articles in Sepulana. Mashego is a vocal advocate for the recognition of all indigenous languages in South Africa.

Another key initiative is the Sepulana Bible Translation Project, a collaborative endeavor involving Wycliffe SA, the Church of the Nazarene, and the Mapulaneng Writers' Association. This project's primary goal is the oral Bible translation and transcription of the New Testament into Sepulana. Phase 1 of the project successfully completed the oral Bible translation of 40 narratives from both the Old and New Testaments, as well as an oral and written translation of the Gospel of Mark. The team is currently in Phase 2, focusing on the translation of the Gospel of Matthew. The project receives support from various sources, including funding from organizations like Johannesburg Waste Management Company. Community members, such as Itireleng Florence Chiloane, a retired teacher and curriculum implementer, play an active role as reviewers, demonstrating the strong local commitment to the project.

The Mapulana community has been actively lobbying for Sepulana to be recognized as an official language of Mpumalanga province. A significant achievement in these efforts occurred in 2018 when a government entity agreed to use Sepulana in official signage, providing formal visibility for the language. This struggle for recognition is part of a broader movement across South Africa, where various indigenous nations, including the Balobedu and AmaHlubi, are seeking official recognition for their languages.

Community engagement is a vital component of these revitalization efforts. Song-writing workshops have been organised with the Mapulana community to create worship songs based on the translated scriptures, thereby integrating the language with cultural and religious practices. These initiatives align with broader language preservation strategies that emphasize community-based programs, cultural events, and the integration of traditional knowledge with language learning. The multi-faceted approach to Sepulana revitalisation, encompassing literary publications, religious translations, and political lobbying, demonstrates a comprehensive and strategic community-led effort to secure the language's future and counteract historical marginalisation. The ultimate aim is to empower indigenous communities to lead their own revitalisation efforts, potentially leveraging technological advancements such as app development to teach younger generations.

== Cultural context of the Mapulana people ==
The Sepulana language is inextricably linked to the rich cultural heritage and history of the Mapulana people. The Mapulana (or Pulana) are a low-veld ethnic group whose name is believed to be derived from their founding leader, Lepulana, who later adopted the name Chiloane. Their historical origins can be traced back to the Kgalagadi, from where they settled in Thaba Chueu, in what is now eastern Lesotho, and Shakwaneng (Carolina) during the 1500s.

Research indicates that the Mapulana people comprise three main ancestral groups: the Mapulana of Mohlomi, who are of Bakwena origin; the Mapulana of Matshwe I, of Pulane, who are of Amazizi (Nguni) origin and previously resided along the Tugela River before joining other Mapulana at Thaba Chueu; and the Mapulana of Chiloane, who are of Barolong (Setswana) origin and separated from the main Barolong tribe during the reign of Tau. This diverse ancestry suggests a complex historical tapestry and potential linguistic influences from various Sotho-Tswana and Nguni groups. Historically, the Mapulana of Chiloane inhabited Phageng (Empakeni) and the Lepunama River area (Nelspruit), while the Mapulana of Mashego lived at Motsheteng (Emjindini, Barberton).

The Mapulana people maintain distinct traditional beliefs and practices that are deeply intertwined with their language. Like most Sotho-Tswana groups, they venerate Badimo (ancestors). Ancestral acknowledgement ceremonies, known as go phasa badimo, involve facing east towards Shakwaneng, pouring traditional beer and animal blood on a sacrificial platform (legandelo), and ritually calling out the names of ancestors according to hierarchy. The Mmalo (Coral) tree is commonly planted on these sacrificial platforms.

Traditional medicine is a recognised specialty among the Mapulana, a practice facilitated by the abundance of medicinal herbs in the subtropical climate of Mapulaneng. Traditional doctors, or Dingaka, undergo rigorous and lengthy training under a Gobela (Guru), with trainees referred to as letwasane (Sangoma). Rainmaking was also a notable specialty of the Mapulana, with the tribe's name itself possibly linked to their rain-making capabilities or the Lepunama (White) River.

The Mapulana also practice initiation rites for their youth, marking the transition into womanhood and manhood. These initiation schools (koma) are held during the winter months. Boys who undergo initiation together form a mphato or moroto (regiment), with an elaborate system in place to distinguish regiments based on their initiation year. The rich tapestry of Mapulana cultural practices and their diverse ancestral origins clearly demonstrate that Sepulana is not merely a linguistic code but a fundamental, living component of a complex cultural heritage. The vitality of Sepulana is directly linked to the continuity of these cultural practices, as the language serves as the primary vehicle for transmitting oral histories, performing rituals, teaching traditional medicine, and conducting initiation ceremonies. Its preservation is therefore crucial for the continuity of Mapulana identity and the unique knowledge systems embedded within their traditions.

The Mapulana share borders and have had historical interactions with several neighboring tribes, including the AmaSwazi to the south, the Mahlanganu/Tsongas to the east, the Bapedi baSekhukhune and Bakone to the west, and the Banareng and Batokwa to the north. Oral histories also recount past conflicts with the Swazis and Shangaans.

== See also ==
- Mapulana people
