= Sotho deficient verbs =

In the Sotho language, the deficient verbs are a special subset of Sesotho verbs that require a subordinate or complementary verb to complete their action, and which are used to form many tenses and to impart certain shades of meaning to the predicate. These verbs form part of multi-verbal conjugations comprising a string of verbs (each with its own subjectival concord) and verbal auxiliaries.

Deficient verbs, being "deficient", are never used alone. Many of them are irregular in form and have irregular inflexions. Many of these verbs seem radical in nature, while others (especially those with complex implications) are obviously derived from certain extant normal verbs (but are used with slightly different meanings). What distinguishes the deficient usage of these normal verbs is the fact that they are followed by another verb and affect its meaning (and only the main verb may carry an objectival concord).

== Multi-verbal syntax ==
Deficient verbs are used to alter the meaning of complementary normal verbs, which have to follow the deficient verb(s) in word order. The following diagram represents the general shape of a typical multi-verbal conjugation ("In vain I edit them all"):

multi-verbal phrase
┌───────────────────────────────┐
│ verbal complex │
│ ┌────────────┐ │
│ │ stem │ │
│ │ ┌──────┐ │
Ke•tswatswa ke•di•hlophisa tsohle
└──────┘ │ │ └───┘ │ └────┘
def. vb. │ │ root │ obj.│
│ └─────────┘ │
│ macro-stem │
└───────────────────┘
verb phrase

The full(er) picture

(The bullets • are used here to join the parts of single words which would have been written separately in the current disjunctive orthography)

Apart from the verbal complex, researchers of Bantu languages have noted that when the main verb is followed by its (first) direct object then this structure creates a "verb phrase" (or "prosodic phrase"), which may be treated as one phonological unit or domain by some grammatical processes. For example, many languages with unbounded tonal shift or spread laws (unlike Sesotho's bounded spread — see Sesotho tonology) may often shift or spread a high tone underlying in the verbal complex all the way to the final, penult, or antepenultimate syllable of the following word, but only if that word is the verb's object. One Sesotho tonal law that's mildly sensitive to the verb phrase is the finality restriction (FR), which is not applied if the verb is immediately followed by the object.

The structure created by deficient verbs followed by a normal verb is unique in a few ways:

1. Deficient verbs must have a complementary (main) verb, and this main verb must follow the deficient verbs, with no intervening words and no variation in word order. This is one of the very few instances in the Sesotho language when word order is absolutely immutable. If one wishes to emphasise the main verb's object then it needs to be placed before the very first deficient verb in the sequence, not just before the main verb.
2. There may be no pauses in speech between the deficient verbs and the main verb, contrary to how other words are treated. The entire sequence is pronounced as one whole unit, and may not be broken up.

== Classification ==
Even though many other Bantu languages have some deficient verbs, the system used in the Sotho–Tswana languages is unusually intricate and specialized, with a rather large number of verbs that may be used deficiently. Although the deficient verbs themselves may usually be used in various moods and tenses, the main verb is limited to only a limited number of moods and tenses, and it is the job of the deficient verb to reflect any changes in these parameters (if it supports them). If multiple deficient verbs are used then each verb affects the mood of the following.

By examining the mood and tense of the main verb, deficient verbs may be classified into six groups according to the type of complement they govern. It is clear that most groups are followed by participial or subjunctive moods, which are precisely the moods often used when forming sequences of verbs or subordinate clauses using non-deficient verbs.

Deficient verb classification
Group	Type of complement
I	Full participial
II	Past subjunctive
III	Perfect subjunctive
IV	Full sequence
V	Present and/or perfect participial
VI	Infinitive

Within the groups, the verbs tend to have similar forms, but often vastly differing conjugation possibilities and behaviours. Some of the verbs are only used in a handful of tenses and moods; some verbs indicate negation by negating the deficient verb itself, some by negating the main verb, and some may do either (or even both at the same time).

Within Groups IV to VI, there is no set number of members and different speakers and communities may differ in the verbs they regularly use. Basically, a verb may become deficient if it used in certain consecutive constructions with a slightly modified meaning that disappears when the verb is used alone. Since the modified meaning does not make any sense when the verb is used alone, the deficient use is marked by having the complement follow the verb directly and with no pause (thus creating a multi-verbal phrase).

[bɑ'ilebɑxut͡ɬʼɑ] ba ile ba kgutla; either 'they went and they returned' when there is a slight pause between the two verbs and the final vowel of -ile ('went') is low toned (due to the Finality Restriction; see Sesotho tonology); or 'they came back' when there is no pause between the two verbs and the final vowel of -ile (a Group II deficient verb indicating definite past tense) is high toned.

In the example sentences under the following sections, the entire verb sequence is bold while the complement verb to the deficient verbs is bold and underlined.

- Group I contains a small number of essential verbs, without some of which it would be impossible to form certain meanings in Sesotho. In form they seem to be contracted perfects, ending with the vowel [e] instead of the usual [ɑ]. Each verb only has one form (the three forms of -be are treated separately) with no change in tense or mood, but the complement may assume a variety of participial tenses. These deficient verbs may be compounded to form certain tenses, and they may be contracted as well.
  1. [se] -se exclusive
  2. [ne] -ne past continuous
  3. [be] -be:
    1. subjunctive
    2. [t͡ɬʼɑbe] -tla be future
    3. [kʼɑbe] -ka be potential
  The firn -se comes from -setse, the perfect of -sala (remain behind), and this form is often used in the Northern Sotho languages for the same purpose as the Sesotho form.
  Examples:
  [tʼɪfɛl̩lɔjɑdi'ɑbɔɪseɪn̩t͡ɬʼɑfɑlɑ] tefello ya diabo e se e ntlafala (contracted [ɪsen̩t͡ɬʼɑfɑlɑ] e se ntlafala): 'the share price is now improving' (exclusive, with present participial complement)
  [liˌʀu'ɑʀu'ɑlɪnelɪǃʷɪlɑ] leruarua le ne le qwela: 'the whale was diving' (past continuous, with present participial complement)
  [lɪǃʰʷɑlɪ'ɑǃʰibidihɑmet͡sʼiɑbeɑpʰɑl̩lɑ] leqhwa le a qhibidiha metsi a be a phalla: 'the ice melts and the water then flows' (subjunctive, with present participial complement)
  [lɪnɑnɛbɑt͡ɬʼɑbebɑlɪŋot͡sʼɪ] Lenane ba tla be ba le ngotse: 'they will have written the programme (future, with perfect participial complement; note that the object is emphasised by placing it first)
  [lɪkʼɑbelɪsɑ'ʊhɑpɑmuˌpʼut͡sʼo] le ka be le sa o hapa moputso: 'you (pl.) would/might not have won the prize' (potential, with negative present participial complement; the Sesotho potential mood has a definitely conditional feel to it)
  [ʀɪneʀɪseʀɪ'uˌfutʰɑmuˌfutʰɔ] re ne re se re o futha mofutho (contracted [neseʀɪ'uˌfutʰɑ] ne se re o futha): 'we were already blowing the bellows' (past exclusive; two Group I verbs with present participial complement)
- Group II contains three verbs. Two of these look like normal verbs ending with -a, while the other is obviously the perfect -ile of the verb -ya ('go'). These verbs behave very differently from each other, but are united by the fact that they take only a past subjunctive complement.
  1. [ile] -ile past
  2. [kʼɑ] -ka emphatic
  3. [t͡ɬʼɑ] -tla preventive
  The morpheme -ile forms the bi-verbal past tense. Basically, using a verb with this deficient verb is an alternative to using the perfect form of a verb, but the use of the deficient verb definitely has a more "completed" (definite past) — though not perfect — feel to it. With stative verbs the perfect form actually gives a present-perfect stative tense, and this differs from the use of this deficient verb as it gives a completed past tense meaning.
  [ʀɪfumɑnɪbʊʀɑlɛ] re fumane borale / [ʀiˌ'ileʀɑfumɑnɑbʊʀɑlɛ] re ile ra fumana borale ('we found iron ore')
  [kʼiˌdut͡sʼɪ] ke dutse I am seated (present-perfect stative), [kʼiˌ'ilekʼɑdulɑ] ke ile ka dula ('I sat, sometime in the past')
  This may be compounded with most Group I verbs (except the simple subjunctive -be) to form perfect, past exclusive, past potential, and past future ("will have done") tenses. The Group I verb appears first, with -ile following pronounced with participial sub-mood tones.
  [ʊkʼɑbeuˌ'ilewɑm̩mɔnɑmɑ'ʊbɑnɪ] o ka be o ile wa mmona maobane ('you could have seen her yesterday' [potential past])
  The morpheme -ka is used in two tenses — remote past indicative (-kile), and present potential (-ka ka) — and is connected with the simple verbal auxiliary infix -ka- used to form the potential mood. The remote past form is highly irregular and is basically an alternative to the -ile deficient verb (indeed, the negative of the -ile forms is constructed with this verb); the present potential emphasises the use of the simple infix -ka-. As with the simple infix, the first person singular subjectival concord ke- becomes a syllabic /ŋ̩/ (written ⟨n⟩ and attached to the following k) by dissimilation.
  [ŋ̩kʼilekʼɑ'ʊbɔnɑlɪt͡sʰeŋ̩] nkile ka o bona letsheng ('I once saw you by the lake')
  [hɑkʼɪ'ɑkʼɑkʼɑ'ʊbɔnɑlɪt͡sʰeŋ̩] ha ke a ka ka o bona letsheng ('I did not see/have never seen you by the lake' [emphatic])
  [bʊlʷet͡sʼɪbʊkʼɑkʼɑbɑnɑmɑ] bolwetse bo ka ka ba nama ('the disease may indeed spread')
  An alternative to -kile is to compound -ka with -ile. This construction is very frequently contracted.
  [uˌ'ilewɑkʼɑwɑsɪfuˌfisɑsɪfʊfɑnɪ] o ile wa ka wa se fofisa sefofane? ('have you ever flown an aircraft?') contracted [ʊlɑkʼɑsɪfuˌfisɑ] o la ka se fofisa
  The morpheme -tla is only found in the positive present potential (it has no negative) with a meaning of "lest" or "or else", used in a type of consecutive construction. The verb is obviously connected with the normal verb meaning "come", but used deficiently with a modified meaning.
  [tʼimɑmʊt͡ɬʼɑkʼɑsɪʊkʼɑt͡ɬʼɑwɑ'ʊbʊlɑjɑ] tima motlakase o ka tla wa o bolaya ('switch off the electricity or else it may kill you')
- Group III contains a small number of verbs, all with irregular forms ending in the vowel /e/. Four of the verbs signify habitual actions, with very minor semantic differences between them, another is occasional in the positive but habitual in the negative (it also forms the negative of -ye which has no negative of its own), and yet another simply the serves the same function as Group II -ile. Note that, apart from a rare consecutive past habitual construction, the only time the perfect subjunctive mood may be used is after these deficient verbs. To form past, future, and potential tenses the Group -ne, -tla be, and -ka be are used by most of these verbs to form tri-verbal forms.
  1. [je] -ye habitual
  2. [be] -be (even do habitually)
  3. [ɬe] -hle emphatic habitual
  4. [ne] -ne definite past
  5. [n̩ne] -nne habitual
  6. [kʼe] -ke occasional
  Examples:
  [kʼɪjekʼɪʀɔbɑlɪmɪsoŋ̩] ke ye ke robale mesong ('I am wont to sleep in the early morning')
  [ʊbeɑbɑ'et͡sʼet͡sʼɪmʊsebet͡sʼi] o be a ba etsetse mosebetsi ('she usually even does their work for them')
  [ditʼɑ'udikʼedit͡sʼʊmɪdit͡ɬʼo'u] ditau di ke di tsome ditlou ('lions occasionally hunt elephants')
- Group IV verbs are rather special in that they may be used in a variety of tense forms, but the form of the deficient verb influences the form of the complement. No one verb may be used in all these configurations and the verbs differ in their uses. Most of them have non-deficient counterparts and end with the normal -a, but some conjugate slightly irregularly.
  Forms of Group IV complements
  Complement form	Used after
  Present participial	1. Present indicative 2. Future indicative 3. Infinitive; 4. Perfect indicative
  Indicative	Perfect indicative
  Present-future subjunctive	1. Future indicative 2. Present-future subjunctive 3. Imperative; 4. Perfect indicative
  Past subjunctive	1. Potential; 2. Past subjunctive 3. Negative subjunctive 4. Negative imperative 5. Perfect indicative
  (The table below gives the normal verbs' meanings, if any, in brackets)
  1. [bɑ] -ba do moreover/eventually 2. [ɬɑ] -hla do indeed 3. [m̩pʼɑ] -mpa do notwithstanding 4. [n̩nɑ] -nna do continually 5. [bʊ'ɛlɑ] -boela do again (return to); 6. [ekʼet͡sʼɑ] -eketsa do further (augment)	7. [fɛlɑ] -fela really do (end); 8. [fiɬɑ] -fihla do immediately (arrive); 9. [pʰɑkʼisɑ] -phakisa do soon/quickly (hasten); 10. [pʰɪtʼɑ] -pheta do again (repeat); 11. [kʼe] -ke certainly will do 12. [ɲɑfɑ] -nyafa do opportunely
  Examples:
  [bɑɬilebɑ'ɑpʼʊtʼɑkʼɑʒenʊ] ba hlile ba a pota kajeno ('they certainly speak nonsense today' [indicative after perfect])
  [kʼɪt͡ɬʼɑm̩pʼekʼɪʀɛkʼɛn̩t͡ɬʼʊ] ke tla mpe ke reke ntlo ('I will at least buy a house' [present-future subjunctive after future indicative])
  [bɑkʼɑn̩nɑbɑ'itʰutʼɑbʊɬɑlɪn̩t͡sʰɪ] ba ka nna ba ithuta bohlale-ntshe ('they can keep on teaching/still teach themselves geography' [past subjunctive after potential])
  [muˌsuweuˌfiɬɑɑbɑfɑdikʼɑʀɑbɔ] mosuwe o fihla a ba fa dikarabo ('the lecturer immediately gives them the answers' [present participial after present indicative])
  [ʀɪt͡ɬʼɑkʼeʀɪtʰɑbɛlɛhʊbɑɬʊlɑ] re tla ke re thabele ho ba hlola ('we will definitely be happy to defeat them' [present-future subjunctive after future indicative])
- Group V contains several normal looking verbs with regular inflexions, most of which have non-deficient uses. Several tense forms exist for the deficient verbs, while the complement is usually present participial though some of the verbs may also have a perfect participial complement.
  1. [bɑt͡ɬʼɑ] -batla do almost/nearly (want); 2. [ɬɔlɑ] -hlola do repeatedly/perpetually (spend time); 3. [dulɑ] -dula do continually (sit); 4. [lɑlɑ] -lala do through the night (lie down); 5. [ǃɛtʼɛl̩lɑ] -qetella do finally (finish completely); 6. [sɑlɑ] -sala do eventually/later (remain behind)	7. [tʼɪnɑ] -tena do necessarily (annoy/provoke); 8. [t͡ɬʼʊhɑ] -tloha do soon afterwards (depart); 9. [t͡sʼʷɑ] -tswa do meanwhile (emerge); 10. [t͡sʼʷɑt͡sʼʷɑ] -tswatswa do in vain 11. [t͡sʼʊhɑ] -tsoha do early/in the morning (awake); 12. [t͡sʰʊhɑ] -tshoha befall unexpectedly (be startled)
  Example:
  [sɪt͡sʼʊkʼʊt͡sʼɑnɪsɑbɑt͡ɬʼɑsɪʀɪbʊlɑjɑ] setsokotsane sa batla se re bolaya ('the tornado nearly killed us')
  [uˌdulɑɑʀɪt͡sʰʷeɲɑkʼɑmɑtʰɑtʼɑɲɑnɑɑhɑ'ɛ] o dula a re tshwenya ka mathatanyana a hae ('he constantly bothers us with his insignificant problems')
  [bɑlet͡sʼɪbɑtʼon̩ne] ba letse ba tonne ('they were wide awake the whole night')
  [ʀɪtʼɪnɑʀɪm̩mit͡sʼɑɪlɪhʊʀɪɑt͡ɬʼo'ɪluˌkʼisɑ] re tena re mmitsa e le hore a tlo e lokisa ('we had to call her so she would fix it (this deficient verb is always followed by a reason for the action')
  [ʊt͡sʼʊhɑɑnʷɪset͡sʼɑdiʒɑlɔ] 'o tsoha a nwesetsa dijalo ('he waters the plants first thing in the morning')
- Group VI contains a number of verbs used with an infinitive complement and which give certain shades of meaning. The infinitive complement is basically a direct noun object (infinitives and imperatives are not verbal moods), and indeed many other verbs may be used this way but are not considered deficient as their meanings do not change slightly when they are.
  1. [ɑnɛlɑ] -anela do merely (suffice)
  2. [ɑtʼisɑ] -atisa do frequently (increase/multiply)
  3. [ʀɑtʼɑ] -rata be on the point of doing (like/desire)
  4. [t͡ɬʼɑmɛhɑ] -tlameha do necessarily (be bound)
  5. [t͡sʰʷɑnɛlɑ] -tshwanela do necessarily (suit/fit)
  Examples:
  [lɪsʊtʰʊhʊ'ɑtʼisɑhʊxɪtʰɑmɑʀihɑ] Lesotho ho atisa ho kgetha Mariha ('it frequently snows in Lesotho in the Winter')
  [ʊʀɑtʼɑhʊʃʷɑ] o rata ho shwa ('he is on the verge of dying')
  [ʊt͡sʰʷɑnet͡sʼɪhʊm̩pʼʊlɛl̩lɑhʊʀɪkʼɪlɪfɪŋ̩liˌǃʰubu] o tshwanetse ho mpolella hore ke lefeng leqhubu ('you have to tell me what the frequency is')
