= Buffelshoek =

- Bolla-Tau
- Location within Mpumalanga Location within South Africa
- Coordinates: 24°37′51″S 31°08′18″E
- Country: South Africa
- Province: Mpumalanga
- District: Ehlanzeni
- Municipality: Bushbuckridge

Area
  - Total: 11.70 km^{2} (4.52 sq mi)

Population (2011)
  - Total: 12,703
  - Density: 1,086/km^{2} (2,812/sq mi)

Racial makeup (2011)
  - Black African: 99.9%

First languages (2011)
  - Sepulana: 92.0%
  - Shangaan: 4.8%
  - Sotho: 1.2%
  - Other: 2.0%
- Time zone: UTC+2 (SAST)

Buffelshoek is a community in Bushbuckridge Local municipality (formerly known as Mapulaneng) in the Mpumalanga province of South Africa. The legal name was changed to Bolla-Tau in 2008.
