= Sotho-Tswana peoples =

Meta-ethnicity of southern Africa

Total population
- unknown; roughly 18–20 million

Regions with significant populations
- South Africa: 15.585 million
- Lesotho: 2.130 million (mostly Sotho)
- Botswana: 2.160 million (mostly Tswana)
- Zimbabwe: 980 000 (Tswana, Sotho & Lozi)
- Zambia: 655 000 (Lozi)
- Namibia: 10 000 (Tswana & Lozi)
- Mozambique: 50 (Lozi)

Languages
- Sotho–Tswana languages Sesotho, Setswana, Northern Sotho, Silozi

Religion
- Modimo, Traditional African religions, Badimo, Christianity (Molimo or Molimu in Silozi)

Related ethnic groups
- Nguni people, Venda people and Tsonga people, San people, Khoisan people

Map showing the proportion of the South African population that speaks a Sotho-Tswana group language (Sotho, Northern Sotho or Tswana) at home, from the 2011 census broken down to ward level.

Dominant languages in South Africa. Southern Sotho Tswana Northern Sotho

The Sotho-Tswana, also known as the Sotho or Basotho, although the term is now closely associated with the Southern Sotho peoples are a meta-ethnicity of Southern Africa. They are a large and diverse group of people who speak Sotho-Tswana languages. The group is predominantly found in Botswana, Lesotho, South Africa, and the western part of Zambia. Smaller groups can also be found in Namibia and Zimbabwe.

The Sotho-Tswana people would have diversified into their current arrangement during the course of the second millennium, but they retain a number of linguistic and cultural characteristics that distinguish them from other Bantu-speakers of southern Africa. These are features such as totemism/diboko a pre-emptive right of men to marry their maternal cousins, and an architectural style characterized by a round hut with a conical thatch roof supported by wooden pillars on the outside. Other major distinguishing features included their dress of skin cloaks and a preference for dense and close settlements, as well as a tradition of large-scale building in stone.

The group mainly consists of four clusters: the Southern Sotho (Sotho), the Northern Sotho (which consists of the Bapedi, the Balobedu and others), the Lozi, the Tswana and the Kgalakgadi. A fifth cluster is sometimes referred to as the Eastern Sotho and consists of the Pulana, Kgolokwe, Pai, and others. The Sotho-Tswana are said to contain some Khoe-San ancestry with levels as high as >20%.

== Ethnonym ==
The Sotho-Tswana ethnic group derives its name from the people who belong to the various Sotho and Tswana clans that live in southern Africa. Historically, all members of the group were referred to as Sothos; the name is now exclusively applied to speakers of Southern Sotho who live mainly in Lesotho and the Free State province in South Africa, while Northern Sotho is reserved for Sotho speakers that inhabit north-eastern South Africa, predominantly in Limpopo.

=== Sotho Ethnonym ===
==== Swazi origin ====
The term Basotho may have originated as a derogatory term used by the Swazi to refer to the Pedi in the 1400s. The Swazi called the Bapedi "Abashuntu" because they wore breechcloths made of animal skins tied in knots to cover their private parts. The word "Abashuntu" comes from the verb "uku shunta," which means "to make a knot."

Despite the derogatory origins of the term, the Pedi adopted it with pride. Other Sotho-speaking groups who also wore breechcloths adopted the term as well, and it eventually came to be used to refer to all Sotho people.

=== Tswana Ethnonym ===
The ethnonym Batswana is thought to be an anantonym that comes from the meaning of the Sotho-Tswana word "tswa", which means "to come out of". The name would be derived from the word "Ba ba tswang" eventually shortened to the word Batswana meaning "The Separatists" or alternatively "the people who cannot hold together". One of the chief characteristics of the Sotho-Tswana clans is their tendency to break up and hive off.

== History ==
=== Early history ===
The Sotho-Tswana are a cultural and ethnic group whose ancestors arrived in Botswana and South Africa around 200–500 AD, they are descendents of the khoi people who in Sesotho(Southern Sotho) are known as Baroa. By the 15th century, the Sotho-Tswana people had begun to disperse throughout the southern Transvaal highveld. Over the next few centuries, the Sotho-Tswana people continued to disperse and form new chiefdoms.

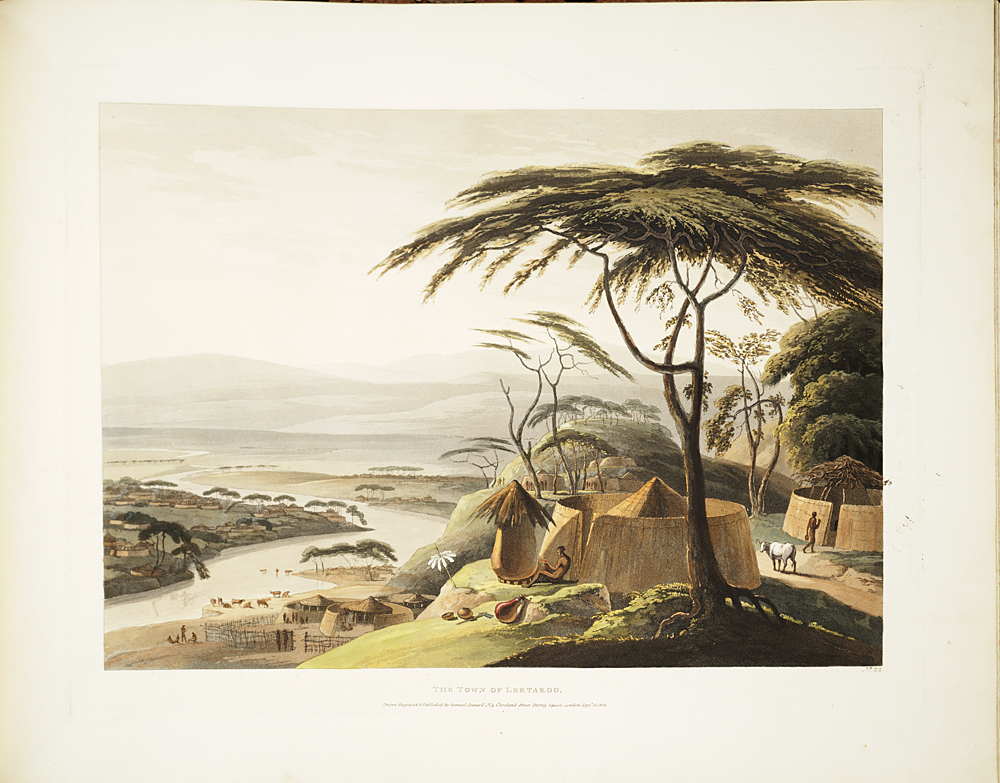
A Sotho-Tswana settlement called Dithakong

Unlike the Nguni people, who predominantly settled in coastal areas, the Sotho-Tswana found their home in the highlands of South Africa, specifically in the region known as the Highveld. This region is situated between the coastal lowlands to the east and south and the Kalahari Desert to the west.

The Sotho-Tswana predominantly inhabited the highlands and steppes, resulting in a relatively lower population density than the Nguni. They were also less reliant on agriculture, instead practicing a mixed economy of farming, herding, and hunting.

=== Difaqane ===
The 19th century marked a significant period of change for the Sotho-Tswana territories due to the expansion of the Nguni people, known as the Mfecane. This expansion prompted local groups to consolidate and form the first states within the region. Notable among these emerging states were the Basotho, Bapedi, and Tswana. One group of Basotho, known as the Kololo, migrated extensively to the north and established their own state in what is now Zambia. During their rule, the language of the conquerors, Lozi, gained prominence in Zambia.

=== Modern history ===
Throughout the 19th century and into the middle of the 20th century, various African groups gradually migrated into the Sotho-Tswana territories, establishing settlements and states. Notable among these were the Transvaal and the Orange Free State. The British Empire later laid claim to these territories, resulting in conflicts with local populations. Eventually, the British defeated the indigenous African groups, and the areas under their control were divided among different territories. South Africa, Bechuanaland (now known as Botswana), Barotseland (now in Zambia), and Basutoland (now Lesotho) emerged as distinct geopolitical entities.

This complex historical process shaped the cultural and political landscape of the Sotho-Tswana territories, contributing to the formation of diverse states and the interaction between various ethnic groups.

== Subdivisions ==
=== Southern Sotho ===
The term Basotho can be used to refer to the following:

- Citizen of Lesotho, regardless of linguistic or ethnic origin
- Any member of the Sotho-Tswana clans that trace their origin to Kgosi Mogale
- Members of the Sotho-Tswana clans that came together under the leadership of Moshoeshoe during the Difaqane.
- The Sotho-Tswana clans that stay in the Free State and Lesotho speak a standardised dialect of the Sotho-Tswana language called Sesotho and sometimes referred to as the Southern Sotho

=== Tswana ===
The term Tswana can be used to refer to one of the following:

- All the Tswana clans residing either in Botswana, Namibia, Zimbabwe or South Africa
- Any member of the Sotho-Tswana clans that trace their origins to Kgosi Mokgatle
- Citizen of Botswana, regardless of linguistic or ethnic origin
- Members of the eight major Sotho-Tswana clans as defined in the Chieftainship Act of Botswana
- Members of the Sotho-Tswana clans that reside in Botswana, South Africa, speak a standardized dialect of the Sotho-Tswana called Setswana, sometimes also referred to as the Western Sotho.
- Any Sotho-Tswana clan that inhabits the Kalahari Desert basin and its eastern and south-western peripheries, unless they are the Kgalagari people, who are a different Sotho-Tswana group of tribes.

=== Northern Sotho ===
The term Northern Sotho can be used to refer to the following:

- The Bapedi
- The Lobedu
- The Tlokwa
- The Babirwa
- Bakoni ba Dikgale

=== Eastern Sotho ===
The term Eastern Sotho can be used to refer to the following:

- The Mapulane
- The Mapaye
- The Bakutswe

=== Lozi ===
The term Lozi can be used to refer to the following:

- The Lozi

== Culture ==
=== Totemism ===
In Sotho-Tswana society, each member has a totem, which is usually an animal. Totems are inherited from the father and thus pass like an English surname. The totem animal had traditionally had a status of veneration and avoidance; in particular, it was important not to eat one's totem. In modern Sotho-Tswana society, this is not as strictly observed. Each morafe or sechaba had its own totem. When naming a clan, the name of the founder or the animal they venerate could be used. An example is the Bahurutshe, named after the founder Mohurutshe; alternatively, they can also be called Batshweneng after the tshwene (baboon), which they venerate; similarly, Batlhako after the founder; or Batloung after the totem. For some clans, the name of the founder and their totem are the same, like the Bakwena and Bataung, where the founders were named Kwena (crocodile) and Tau (lion), respectively.

== Sotho-Tswana Clans and Rank ==
=== Clan Structure ===
An important distinction that needs to be made when discussing Sotho-Tswana clans is to distinguish between the different clans and the various sub-clans below them. This means distinguishing between clans that share the same totem, like the crocodile, but are distinct, such as the Bapo, Bakwena, Bangwaketse, and Bafokeng of Phokeng. In distinguishing between subclans, an example is the Bakgatla, who separated into Bakgatla ba Kgafela and Bakgatla ba ga Mmakau over who should lead the clan. One faction defied the usual tradition of male leaders and acknowledged the female, Mmakau, as their kgosi. Those who supported Kgafela then broke away. Further offshoots from the Bakgatla are the Bakgatla ba Mmanaana, Bakgatla ba Mmakau, and Bakgatla ba Motsha, who all have the kgabo as their totem. The Bakgatla ba Mmakau would later give rise to Bapedi, BaKholokoe, Batlokwa, BaPhuti and Basia clans If a dispute were to arise between any of the offshoot clans, like the Basia and Baphiti, then the Mmakau chief would be tasked with resolving it as their senior.

=== Clan Seniority ===
The question of rank and seniority is one that is very important to the Tswana. It determines a lot, from family relationships, to village matters to relationships between clans and between the different tribal groups. In a family situation, the issue of rank determines when a son will undergo initiation, or receive an inheritance. A further distinction is also made between the senior wife and the junior wife if a man is in a polygamous marriage.

The Barolong arrived in Southern Africa in and around the year 1100 led by their Kgosikgolo Morolong. The Baphofung under their Kgosi Malope arrived in Southern Africa in and around the years 1400. These Baphofung later split to become Bahurutshe, Bakwena,Bakgatla,Bangoato and Bangwaketse after the death of their father Malope. Mohurutshe (woman) from the first house of Malope fought with her younger brother from the second house Kwena for Bogosi. Based on these facts alone Bahurutshe cannot claim Seniority over Barolong who allocated land for their settlement when they arrived in and around year 1400.

By right the Barolong are Senior. There is no Genealogical relationship between Barolong and Bahurutshe as they arrived in Southern Africa 300 years apart, in fact the nation of Bahurutshe came about only after the split of the Baphofung nation after the death of Kgosi Malope. That fact in itself nullifies the claim that Bahurutshe are Senior to Barolong.

As the BaTswana lived in large villages, seniority and rank also played a part here. The chief's homestead is situated at the center of the village, and thereafter the other citizens are grouped according to rank, with the most junior members living the furthest from the village center. Inter and intra-clan relationships have been a question that has occupied the BaTswana since the split that occurred between the followers of Mohurutshe and Kwena. While it is generally accepted that the Hurutshe are the senior clan, some of the other clans have disputed this, mainly the Bafokeng, Barolong, and Bakgatla. In the case of the Barolong, the Batlhaping, who are an offshoot of the Barolong, acknowledge the Barolong as their Senior. The Bafokeng maintain that their split from the core Tswana body predated the split between Mohurutshe and Kwena, and therefore they are equal in status to the Bahurutshe, if not senior. The Basotho are the offshoot of Bakgatla and initially venerated the Kgabo(Monkey) as their Totem.

These disputes over seniority and rank were driven by the quest for benefits and independence, a senior kgosi could demand a payment of tribute from a junior chief, and they could also summon a junior chief or member of his clan to kgotla for a hearing. If a dispute arose between two junior chiefs, the most senior chief closest to them would be invited to resolve it. Another important factor was that a senior chief or members of his clan could not be summoned to the Kgotla by a junior kgosi or clan member. An additional factor in this question of rank and seniority is that it was determined by birth and could not be changed; this means a chief born of minor status could not change his standing relative to the other chiefs. This was mainly to discourage the split up of clans into further sub-clans and the buildup of clans through conquest and warfare.

== Notable people ==
Politics

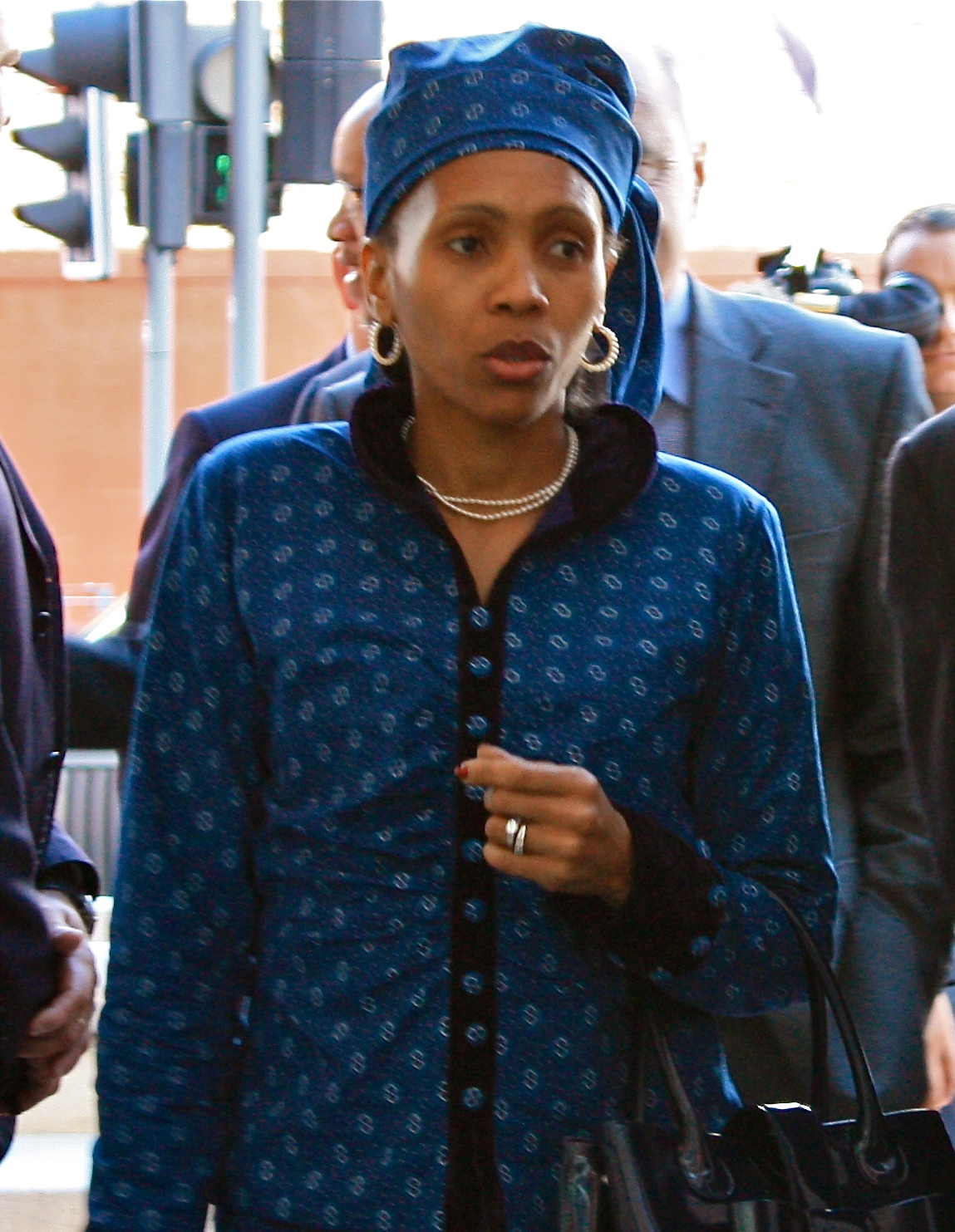
Queen 'Masenate Mohato Seeiso

- Moshoeshoe I, Founder of the Basotho nation
- Moshoeshoe II, Paramount Chief of Lesotho
- King Letsie – Reigning King of the Basotho
- Queen 'Masenate Mohato Seeiso – the queen consort of Lesotho
- Pakalitha Mosisili – Former Prime Minister of Lesotho
- Ace Magashule – Secretary General of the African National Congress, Former Premier of the Free State
- Tom Thabane – Former Prime Minister of Lesotho
- Ntsu Mokhehle – Former Prime Minister of Lesotho
- Leabua Jonathan – Former Prime Minister of Lesotho
- Mosiuoa Lekota – South African anti-apartheid activist, Member of Parliament. And the current President of the COPE
- Hlaudi Motsoeneng – South African radio personality and broadcasting executive
- Kgalema Motlanthe – 3rd President of South Africa
- Lesetja Kganyago – Governor of the South African Reserve Bank.
- Edward Lekganyane – the Zion Christian Church (ZCC) leader
- Engenas Lekganyane -the founder of Zion Christian Church (ZCC)
- Sefako Makgatho – second President of the African National Congress, born in Ga-Mphahlele village
- Malegapuru William Makgoba – Doctor
- Thabo Makgoba – South African Anglican Archbishop of Cape Town
- David Makhura – premier of Gauteng Province
- Julius Malema – political leader. Former leader of the ANC Youth League. Commander in Chief of the Economic Freedom Fighters (EFF)
- Mampuru II – King of the Pedi (1879 – 1883)
- Richard Maponya – South African businessmen and founder and first president of the National African Federated Chamber of Commerce (NAFCOC). Born in Lenyeye, Tzaneen.
- Cassel Mathale – third premier of Limpopo province
- Lebo Mathosa – Musician
- Kenneth Meshoe – politician
- Peter Mokaba – former politician. Former leader of the ANC Youth League
- Lydia Mokgokoloshi – actress
- Sello Moloto – former premier of Limpopo province
- Trott Moloto – Former South Africa National Soccer Coach
- Mathole Motshekga- Politician
- Aaron Motsoaledi – Minister of Health, South Africa and nephew of Elias Motsoaledi
- Caroline Motsoaledi – South African political activist and wife of Elias Motsoaledi
- Elias Motsoaledi – South African anti-apartheid activist and one of the eight men sentenced to life imprisonment at the Rivonia Trial
- Es'kia Mphahlele – writer, educationist, artist, and activist.
- Letlapa Mphahlele – former President of the Pan Africanist Congress (PAC).
- Gift Ngoepe – the first black South African, and the sixth South African to sign a professional baseball contract when he signed in October 2008
- Lilian Ngoyi – anti-apartheid activist.
- Maite Nkoana-Mashabane – Minister of Rural Development and Land Reform, South Africa
- Ngoako Ramatlhodi – first premier of Limpopo province
- Gwen Ramokgopa – Deputy Minister of Health, former MEC of Health in Gauteng Province
- Mamphela Ramphele – Former Director at World Bank. Former principal of the University of Cape Town.
- Sello Rasethaba – businessman
- Thabo Sefolosha – American basketball player. His father Patrick Sefolosha was a musician from South Africa.
- King Matsebe Sekhukhune – son of King Sekwati. He fought two wars: first successfully in 1876 against the SAR and their Swazi allies, then unsuccessfully against the British and Swazi in 1879 during the Sekukuni Wars.
- Mmanthatisi - Batlokwa Queen and leader (1784 – 1847)

Entertainment

- Joshua Pulumo Mohapeloa – Music composer
- Lira – South African singer
- Mpho Koaho – Canadian-born actor of Sotho ancestry
- Terry Pheto – South African actress
- Sankomota – Lesotho Jazz band
- Kamo Mphela – South African dancer
- Fana Mokoena – South African actor and Member of Parliament for Economic Freedom Fighters
- Kabelo Mabalane – South African musician and 1/3 of Kwaito group Tkzee
- Presley Chweneyagae – South African actor. He starred in the film Tsotsi, which won the Academy Award for Foreign Language Film
- Khuli Chana – South African hip hop artist
- Caiphus Semenya – musician
- Caster Semenya – athlete, Olympic Games medal winner
- Judith Sephuma – Musician
- King Monada – famous artist.
- Master KG – famous artist and composer of the popular song Jerusalema.
- Katlego Danke – South African actress
- Connie Ferguson – Botswana born South African actress
- Shona Ferguson – Botswana born South African businessman, actor, film producer and co-founder of Ferguson Films
- DJ Fresh – Botswana born South African radio personality
- Goapele – American singer with Setswana ancestry
- Thebe Kgositsile – American rapper, father is Keorapetse Kgositsile
- A-Reece - South African rapper and record producer
- Mpule Kwelagobe – Former Miss Universe
- Kagiso Lediga – South African stand-up comedian, actor and director
- Gail Nkoane Mabalane – South African actress, model, media socialite, businesswoman and singer
- Kabelo Mabalane – South African kwaito musician, songwriter and actor. He was a member of the kwaito trio TKZee
- Maps Maponyane – South African television presenter, actor, fashion designer, speaker, model, voice over artist, philanthropist and entrepreneur
- Bonang Matheba – South African media personality
- Tim Modise – South African journalist, TV and radio presenter
- Tumi Morake – South African comedian, actress, TV personality, and writer. Current presenter of "Dirage" on Motsweding Fm
- Cassper Nyovest – aka Refiloe Maele Phoolo, South African hip hop artist
- Hip Hop Pantsula – South African artist
- Manaka Ranaka – South African actress
- Dolly Rathebe – musician and actress
- Rapulana Seiphemo – South African actor
- Tuks Senganga – aka Tumelo Kepadisa, Setswana rapper
- Boity Thulo – South African actress
- Redi Tlhabi – Journalist, producer, author and radio presenter
- Emma Wareus – Former Miss World First Princess
- Zeus – aka Game Goabaone Bantsi, Botswana born Setswana rapper

Sport

- Khotso Mokoena – Athlete (Long jump)
- Pitso Mosimane – South African football former player and coach – current manager of Al Ahly in the Egyptian Premier League
- Molefi Ntseki – Former football coach for Bafana Bafana
- Steve Lekoelea – Former football player for Orlando Pirates
- Aaron Mokoena – Former football player for Jomo Cosmos, Blackburn Rovers, and Portsmouth FC
- Thabo Mooki – Former football player for Kaizer Chiefs and Bafana Bafana
- Abia Nale – Former football player for Kaizer Chiefs
- Lebohang Mokoena – Football player for Moroka Swallows
- Jacob Lekgetho – Former football player for Moroka Swallows
- Vincent Pule – Football player for Orlando Pirates
- Ben Motshwari – Football player for Orlando Pirates
- Lehlohonolo Seema – Retired footballer, Coach of Chippa United
- Lebohang Maboe – Football player for Mamelodi Sundowns
- Reneilwe Letsholonyane – South African footballer
- Itumeleng Khune – South African footballer
- Victor Mpitsang – South African cricketer, fast bowler who has played for South Africa, currently cricket National Convenor of Selectors
- Lucky Lekgwathi – Former South African footballer
- Dikgang Mabalane – South African football player
- Marks Maponyane – retired South African football player
- Amantle Montsho – Former world 800 metres champion
- Kaizer Motaung – Former South African footballer and chairman of Kaizer Chiefs
- Kaizer Motaung Junior – Former South African footballer
- Katlego Mphela – South African footballer
- Kagiso Rabada – South African cricketer, debut for South Africa in November 2014 and by July 2018 he had topped both the ICC ODI bowler rankings and the ICC Test bowler rankings aged 22
- Kwena Maphaka - South African cricketer. Youngest South African man to play international cricket, at 18 years, 137 days old.
- Jimmy Tau – Former South African footballer
- Percy Tau – South African footballer
- Baboloki Thebe – Commonwealth 800 metres silver medalist. 4x4 Commonwealth gold medalist

=== Politics, royalty, activism, business and economics ===
- Frances Baard – Organiser of the African National Congress (ANC) Women's League and Trade Unionist
- Bathoen I – Former Kgosi (paramount chief) of the Ngwaketse
- Manne Dipico – first premier of Northern Cape province, South Africa
- Winkie Direko – former premier of Free State and former chancellor of University of Free State
- Unity Dow – Botswana former High Court judge, author, activist, Minister
- John Taolo Gaetsewe – Trade unionist, member of the ANC and General Secretary of SACTU, Robben Island prisoner, banned person
- Khama III – King of Botswana
- Ian Khama – Fourth President of Botswana
- Seretse Khama – First President of Botswana
- Moses Kotane – South African politician and activist
- David Magang – Botswana lawyer, businessman and politician
- Supra Mahumapelo – South African politician
- Mmusi Maimane – South African politician
- Toto Makgolokwe – Paramount chief (kgosi) of the Batlharo tribe of South Africa
- Lucas Mangope – Former President of Bophuthatswana
- Quett Masire – Second President of Botswana
- Mokgweetsi Masisi – President of Botswana
- Joe Matthews – South African politician
- Naledi Pandor (née Matthews) – South African politician and minister
- Festus Mogae – Third President of Botswana
- Mogoeng Mogoeng – Chief Justice, South Africa
- Job Mokgoro – South African politician and academic
- Yvonne Mokgoro – Former South African Constitutional Court Justice
- Brian Molefe – South African businessman, appointed CEO of Transnet in February 2011, and CEO of Eskom in April 2015
- Popo Molefe – first premier of North West province, South Africa
- Dipuo Peters – South Africa politician, former Minister of Transport and Minister of Energy from 2009 to 2013
- Edna Molewa – South African politician
- Leruo Molotlegi – King of the Royal Bafokeng Nation
- Ruth Mompati – South African political activist
- James Moroka – one of the ANC Presidents (1949 to 1952)
- Dikgang Moseneke – South African judge and former Deputy Chief Justice of South Africa

- Nthato Motlana – Prominent South African businessman, physician and anti-apartheid activist
- Bridgette Motsepe – South African businesswoman
- Patrice Motsepe – South African billionaire mining businessman
- Tshepo Motsepe – First Lady of South Africa as the wife of Cyril Ramaphosa, the President of South Africa
- Sebele I – Former Chief (Kgosi) of the Kwena – a major Tswana tribe (morafe) in modern-day Botswana
- Molefi Sefularo – South African politician
- Abram Onkgopotse Tiro – South African student activist and black consciousness militant

=== Religion ===
- Frederick Samuel Modise, founder of the International Pentecostal Holiness Church
- Glayton Modise, the International Pentecostal Holiness Church leader

== See also ==
- Tswana people
- Sotho people
- Pedi people
- Barotseland
- Lozi people

== Sources ==
- Mesthrie, Rajend (1995). Language and Social History: Studies in South African Sociolinguistics. New Africa Books. p. 49. ISBN 0-86486-280-6.
- Setiloane, Gabriel M. (1976). The Image of God Among the Sotho-Tswana. Taylor & Francis. ISBN 90-6191-007-2.
- Totem Media. (2010). Mining the Future – The Bafokeng Story. Royal Bafokeng Administration. ISBN 978-1-77009-824-4.
- Kobus du Pisani. (2010). The Last Frontier War:Braklaagte and the Battle for Land Before, During and After Apartheid. Rozenberg Publishers. ISBN 978-9-03610-090-8.
