= Acornhoek =

- Location within Mpumalanga Location within South Africa
- Coordinates: 24.593°S 31.097°E
- Country: South Africa
- Province: Mpumalanga
- District: Ehlanzeni
- Municipality: Bushbuckridge

Area
  - Total: 38.89 km^{2} (15.02 sq mi)

Population (2011)
  - Total: 33,529
  - Density: 862.1/km^{2} (2,233/sq mi)

Racial makeup (2011)
  - Black African: 99.7%
  - Coloured: 0.1%
  - Indian/Asian: 0.1%
  - White: 0.1%
  - Other: 0.1%

First languages (2011)
  - Tsonga: 60.4%
  - Northern Sotho: 34.4%
  - Sotho: 6.1%
  - Other: 3.2%
- Time zone: UTC+2 (SAST)
- PO box: 1360
- Area code: 013

Acornhoek, commonly known as Khenhuk, is a semi-rural town situated in the north eastern areas of Bushbuckridge in the Mpumalanga province of South Africa.

Established in the late 1950s, the town is located about 38 km south-east of Hoedspruit in Limpopo and 165 km north-west of Komatipoort near the border post of Mozambique and eSwatini. The name Acornhoek is variously explained as being an adaptation of Eekhoornhoek ('squirrel corner'); derived from the German surname Eichhorn, and named after the acorn-like fruits of the marula tree.

The main languages spoken in Acornhoek are Sepulana and Xitsonga. Most of Vatsonga people occupy the eastern side of this semi-rural township while the Mapulana people are settled on the western and southern areas.

== Commercial activity ==
There are three main commercial areas in this rural township namely; Acornhoek CBD, Acornhoek Plaza and Acornhoek mall.

At these areas residents are able to access banks, grocery shops, clothing outlets, take-away franchises and many others.

The town has one public hospital, Tintswalo Hospital. Tintswalo Hospital was built in the 1930s and it is one of the largest medical facility in Bushbuckridge sub-region. Several residents from as far as Phalaborwa in the Limpopo province also visits the hospital.

There is one police station in the township and a Magistrate's Court. Ehlanzeni FET College is one of the most popular areas in the township which attracts a lot of students from various areas across the country.

Acornhoek is also home to the regional offices of Bushbuckridge Local Municipality, and also a small traffic police department.

Public transport is by mini-bus or taxi and bus. The nearest airport is Eastgate Airport which is about 25km away from the township.

Airport transfers and sightseeing tours are offered from the Eastgate Airport. There are several fuel filling stations in the township.

== Social gatherings ==
Football is currently the main sport dominating communities of Acornhoek with no other sport being developed in the area. Teams like Happy Dam, Acornhoek United, Juventus, Zilla Spurs, White Hill, Score Rangers, Dynamos, All Blacks, Mhandzi, Ockthula, Burkina Faso, and the Sipho Dzimba-owned Acornhoek City amongst others, still exist and compete in different regional competitions.

Several trials have been made to establish other sporting codes but have failed due to lack of continued support. In the late 2000s, Vincent Mathebula introduced cricket to young prospects but insufficient resources forced them to abandon the initiative.

Acornhoek has several nightlife spots with 13Sixty Lifestyle being the main one, which is a Pub and Grill (locally known as Shisanyama). It host different kinds of events where local and national artists perform to entertain the locals and visitors.

== Acornhoek News ==
Acornhoek News is an online news publication focusing on events that happen on the area and other issues of interest. The publication first went live during community unrests in 2018 as updates were posted on their Facebook page which subsequently became their primary publishing platform. The publication was welcomed by readers and became a source of local news for many. Their successful run sparked interest of print media hence causing tension with other subjects. The publication page was later purchased by Brand Acornhoek.

== Brand Acornhoek ==
Seeing the need to provide development support, a group of individuals hailing from Acornhoek gathered and resolved to establish Brand Acornhoek, a marketing and development platform that also serves as a lobby organisation.

The initiative also runs Corporate Social Investments gigs for local businesses using the Miss Acornhoek Foundation ambassadors as project faces. The organisation is yet to crown the official Miss Acornhoek after many delays and controversial crowning of the 2017 winner.

The 2017 competition was cancelled due to the results being rigged and organisers are yet to host the official edition.

== Amenities ==
Accommodation is available in B&B's, Lodges, Guest Houses, and nearby private game reserves including the Timbavati Game Reserve. For nature and wildlife attractions, one can access the Kruger National Park through the Orpen gate entrance that is 39 km away, Manyeleti Game Reserve which is 49 km away, or Blyde River Canyon which is 50 km away.
