= Kgatla =

Kgatla may refer to:

- The Kgatla tribe of Botswana and north-western South Africa
- Their Kgatla language
