= Benjamin Silinda =

Business and Founder of Nazarene Revival

Bishop Benjamin Silinda

Personal details
- Born: Benjamin Jack Silinda; 5 May 1925 Zoeknog, Eastern Transvaal, South Africa.
- Died: 9 March 2015 (aged 89)
- Spouse: Pauline Ngobeni-Silinda
- Occupation: Apostle, Prophet, Bishop; Architect; and Evangelist

Benjamin Jack Silinda (5 May 1925 – 9 March 2015) was a businessman and a founder of the Nazarene Revival, which became one of the largest African-initiated churches in South Africa. He attended school at Lydenburg and established his shop businesses in 1955 in the areas of Bushbuckridge and Acornhoek. In 1971, he built his first church which, over the years, grew to have over 200 branches across South Africa.
