= Manzini (surname) =

Manzini is an Italian surname. Notable people with the surname include:

- Baptiste Manzini (1920 – 2008), professional American football player and high school football coach
- Carlo Antonio Manzini (1599-1677/1678), an Italian astronomer and mathematician
- Ezio Manzini, Italian design academic and author
- Gianna Manzini (1896–1974), Italian writer
- Italia Almirante Manzini (1890 – 1941), Italian silent film actress
- Lerato Manzini (born 1991), South African professional footballer
- Luigi Manzini (1805–1866), Neoclassical painter from Modena
- Michael Manzini, a South African football player
- Pier Conti-Manzini, (1946–2003), Italian Olympic rower (1968 and 1972)
- Raimondo Manzini (1668-1744), Bolognese painter
- Raimondo Manzini (journalist), Catholic journalist and parliamentarian
- Rhulani Manzini (born 1988), South African soccer player
- Sasekani Janet Manzini (born 1979), South African politician

== See also ==
- Manzini (disambiguation)
