= Mapulana people =

Pulana people
Mapulane

Regions with significant populations
- South Africa: +/- 800,000

Languages
- First language Sepulane; Second language English, Sepedi

Religion
- African traditional religion.

Related ethnic groups
- Tswana people, Pedi people, Lobedu people, Sotho people, and Lozi people

Pulana
- Person: Mopulane
- People: Mapulana
- Language: Sepulane
- Country: Mapulaneng

The Mapulana or Pulana, are a low-veld ethnic group found in Bushbuckridge/Kgopatshweu, Graskop, Hazyview, Whiteriver/Lekokoto, Sabie/Malekutu, Mashishing and Mbombela/Lepunama in Mpumalanga and Limpopo provinces. Their language is called Sepulana, it is erroneously considered a dialect of the Northern Sotho language group due to their proximity to the Bapedi people of Limpopo. Although it does share some similarities to Sepedi Northern Sotho, it is not a dialect of Sepedi - Sesotho Sa Lebowa). Sepulana forms part of the Eastern Sotho tribes, alongside Pai and Kutswe. Some of the Eastern Sotho tribes were settled in the Pilgrim's Rest district of the Former Transvaal Province. It is influenced by Swati, Xitsonga, and Sekone.

The area where the Mapulana live is called Mapulaneng; it stretches from Crocodile River in the south to the Swazi border (Mapulana of Mashego), in the north from the Crocodile River to Olifants River (Limpopo) in the north (Mapulana of Chiloane), Lebombo/Lebopo Mountains in the east, and also includes the towns of Hazyview, White River in Mpumalanga (Lepunama), Sabie/Malekutu, Graskop, Hoedspruit, Barberton/Motshiteng, Lydenburg/Mashishing and Dullstroom/Seokodibeng in the west. In the Pulana language, or Sepulana, Mapulaneng means "Place of the Mapulana people." The tribe derives its name from their founding leader, Lepulana, who later changed his name to Chiloane. Lepulana was known for his rain making capabilities. Mapulana are descendants of Morolong, and their origins can be traced back to the Kgalagadi before they settled in Thaba Chueu, in what is today eastern Lesotho and Shakwaneng (Carolina) in the 1500s. Mapulana of Matshwe got their name from their leader, Pulane. They are offshoots of Amazizi and of Nguni origin.

== History ==
The origin of the MaPulana and the history of how long they have been living in the greater Mapulaneng area are topics of hot debate. Research shows that there are three groups of Mapulana: Mapulana of Mohlomi, who are Bakwena, and the first Mapulana to settle at Thaba Chueu, Mapulana of Matshwe I, of Pulane, who are Amazizi, who used to live along the Tugela River and later joined the other Mapulana at Thaba Chueu. The Mapulana of Chiloane, who are Barolong by origin,(A Batswana tribe) and left the main Barolong tribe during the reign of Tau. The Mapulana King Malele had two prominent sons: the eldest was Morale, also known as Chiloane Jr., and the second was Mashego. The two were better warriors and well respected by their followers. A bitter quarrel erupted between the two brothers over a young woman who happened to be their cousin, and the conflict was concealed by the royal family, who told the people that the brothers fought over a grain barn (seshego sa mabele). After realizing that the people were supporting the elder brother, Mashego left with his followers and settled along some Bakwena of Pai in what is present-day Eswatini separating himself from the main Mapulana tribe. Chiloane and Mashego were both recognized as Mapulana kings, with Chiloane being the senior. The Mapulana of Chiloane used to live in Phageng (Empakeni), south-east of Nelspruit and along the Lepunama River (Nelspruit), while the Mapulana of Mashego lived at Motshiteng (Emjindini, Barberton where Masoyi II, grandson of Mashego, was buried). MaPulana historian Moses Mashego tells us, "They had two kings, Mashego and Chiloane; the rest were subjects and chiefs."

In December 1864, the MaPulana defeated the Swazis at the battle of Moholoholo under the leadership of Maripe Mashile, Chiloane, and Mohlala, with Sekakole Maatjie, who was a brave warrior and a magician. The Bapedi under King Sekhukhune refused to help, and the Mapulana defended their stronghold of Moholoholo Mountain against a Swazi invasion sent by King Mswati II. The Swazi were annihilated, and the first to meet their death at the top of the mountain was the Swazi king's younger brother Zimase. The Swazi suffered a heavy defeat with some survivors requested asylum at Sekhukhune, others went to hide among the tribes in what is today the Kruger National Park, a larger group settled in Motshiteng(Barberton) as they were afraid that they will be killed should they return to return to Eswatini. Boulders were rolled down to ward off the enemy, and numerous attacks on their stronghold were repelled. Skeletons of the Swazi casualties littered the mountain for a long time afterwards. The river below the Mountain was named Motlasedi (Klaserie)

The final defeat of the Swazi was in 1865 at the Tlhapa-o-dje rock cave where they were ambushed by a combined army of Mapulana, Baroka and some Bapedi who came to seek refuge among Mapulana.

There are legendary tales among the MaPulana about the bravery and cleverness of Sekakole (who was already an old man) at the Battle of Moholoholo. It is said that he wielded guns that he had traded for and performed many magic spells to best the Swazi soldiers, with one notable tale telling of how he turned himself into an anthill to confuse his enemy and escape.

== Culture and traditions ==
=== Religion ===
Like most Sotho-Tswana groups, MaPulana believe in Badimo (ancestors). When they perform their ancestral acknowledgement ceremony (go phasa badimo), they face the direction of Shakwaneng, which is towards the east. There is no single god, but all the ancestors or spirits are venerated. To acknowledge those who have passed on, you occasionally need to communicate. When commencing the communication process, traditional beer is made and an animal (a goat/chicken/cow) is slaughtered. Some of the blood of the slaughtered animal, together with some beer, is poured on the legandelo (sacrificial platform) as an offering to the spirits. The senior most member of the clan present at the sacrifice calls out the names of the ancestors according to hierarchy, accompanied by the clapping of hands of the other members of the clan. The Mmalo (Coral) tree is usually planted on the sacrificial platform.

=== Culture ===
Cultural dance

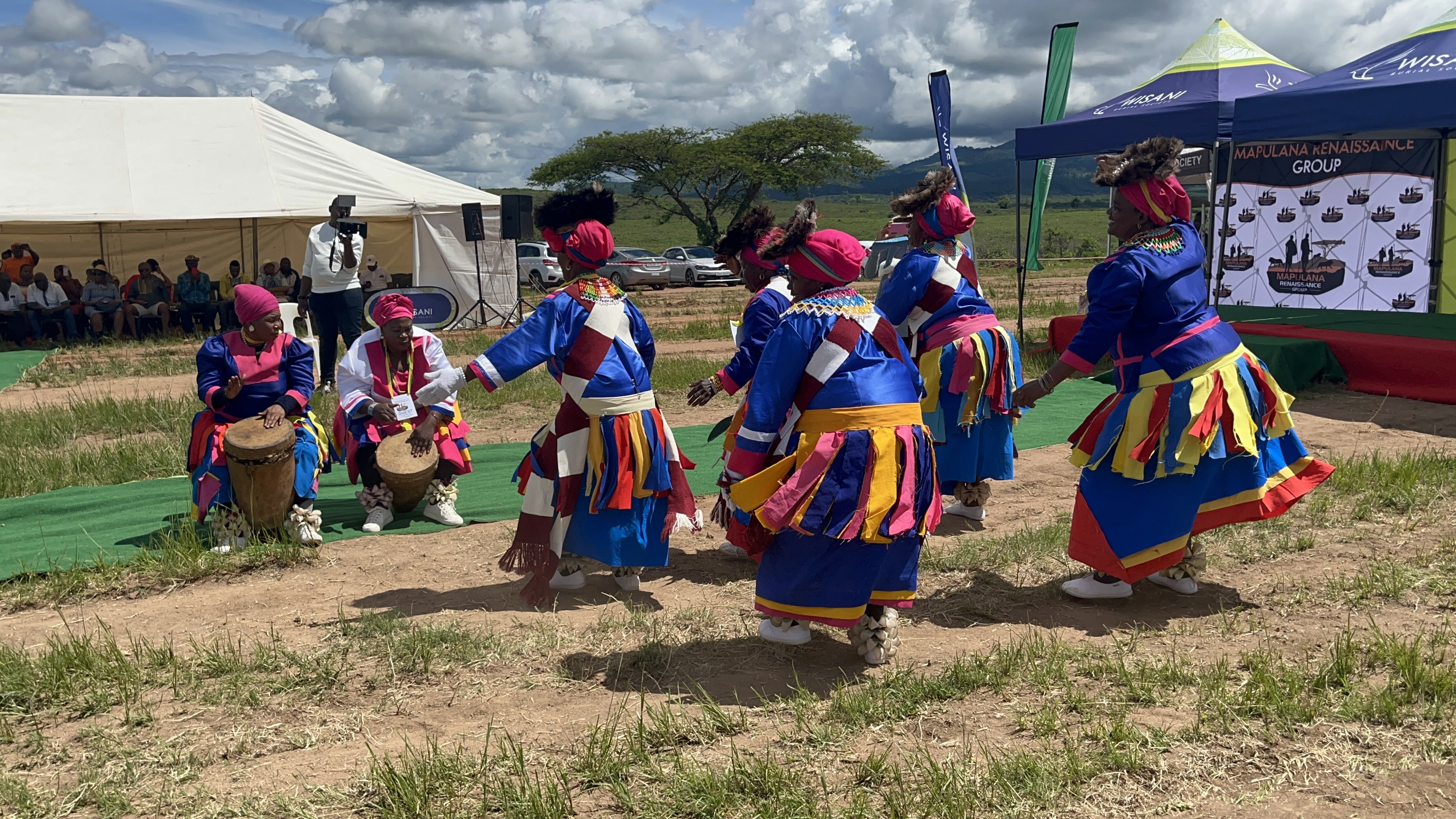

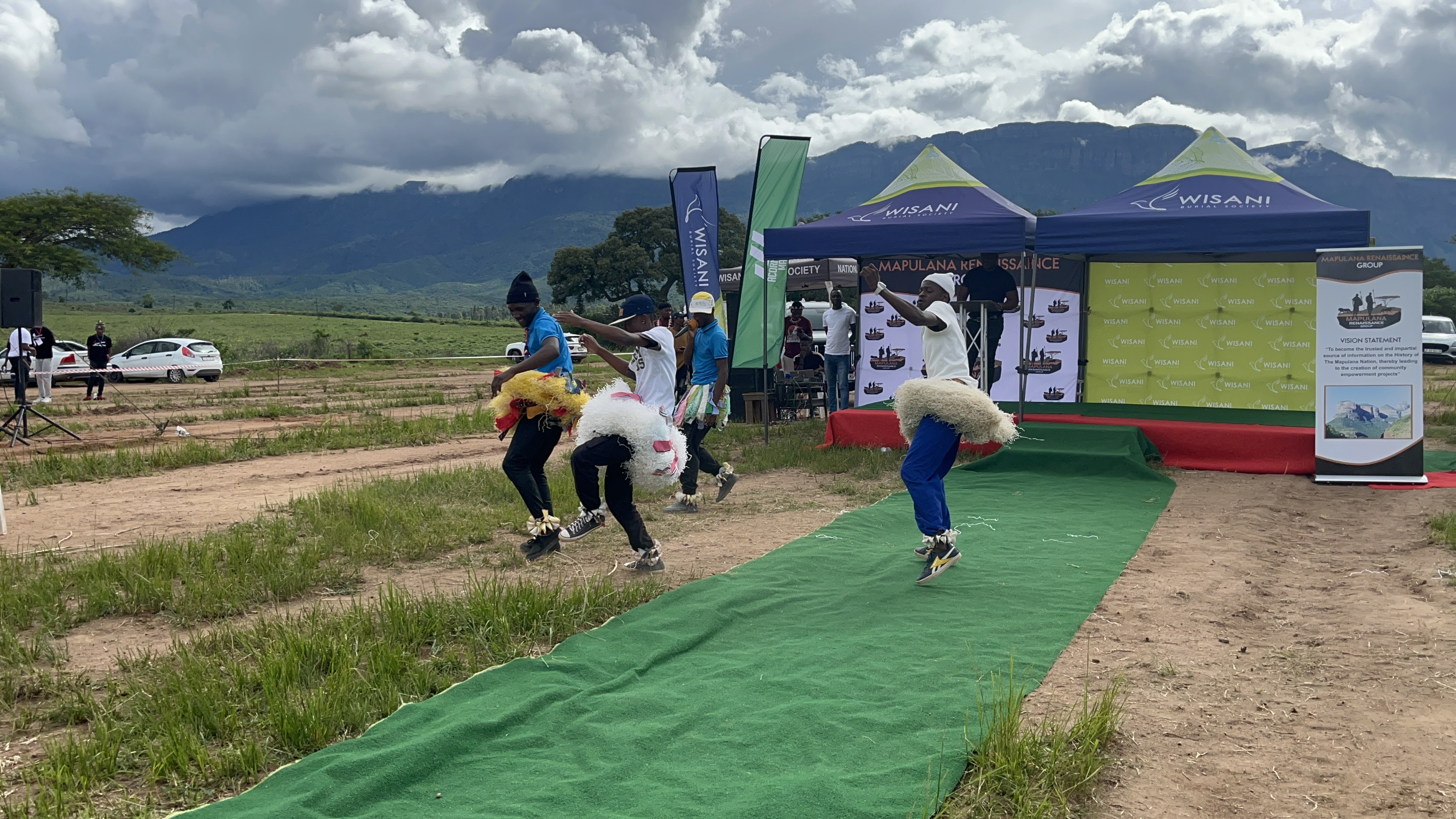

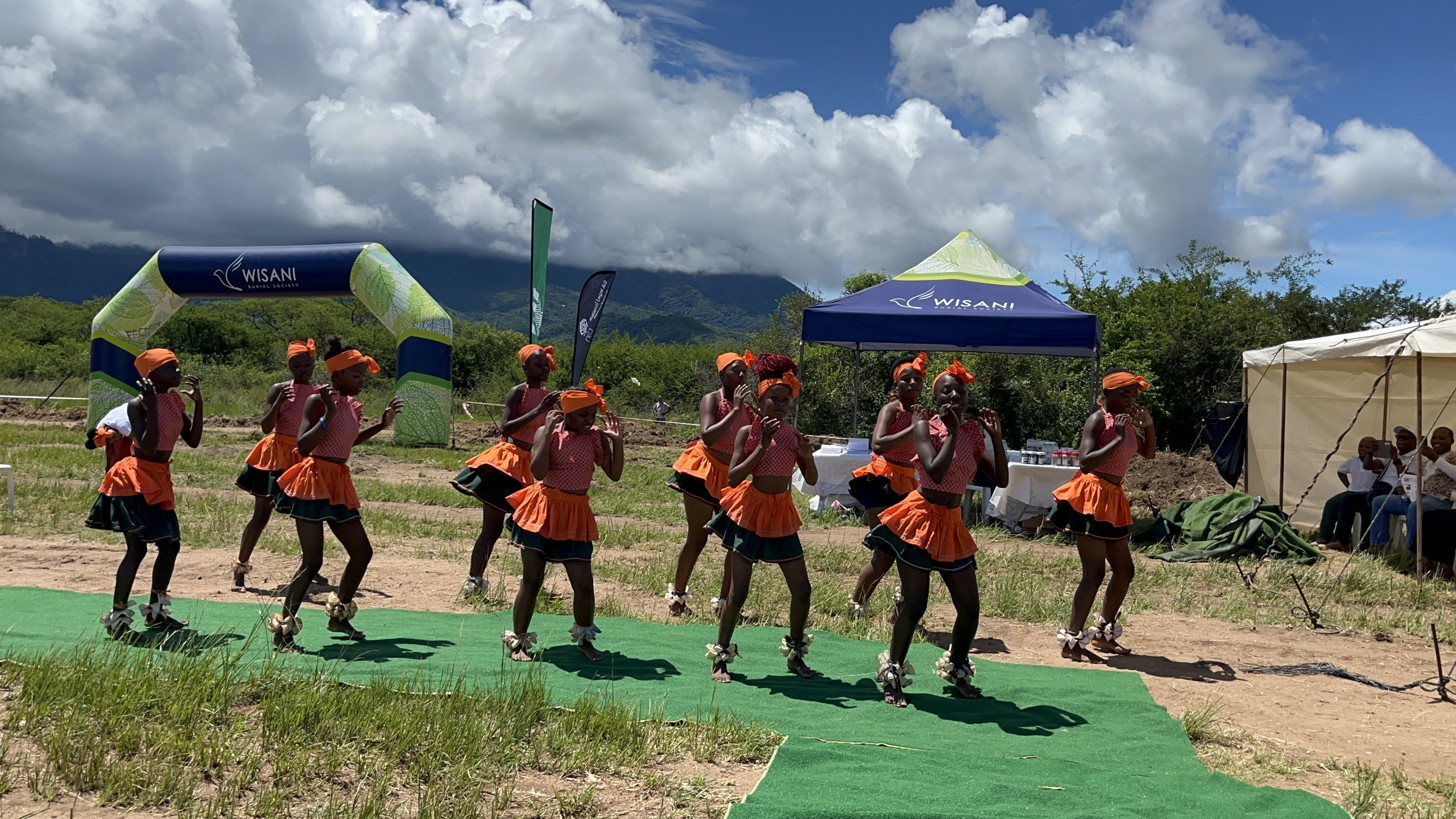

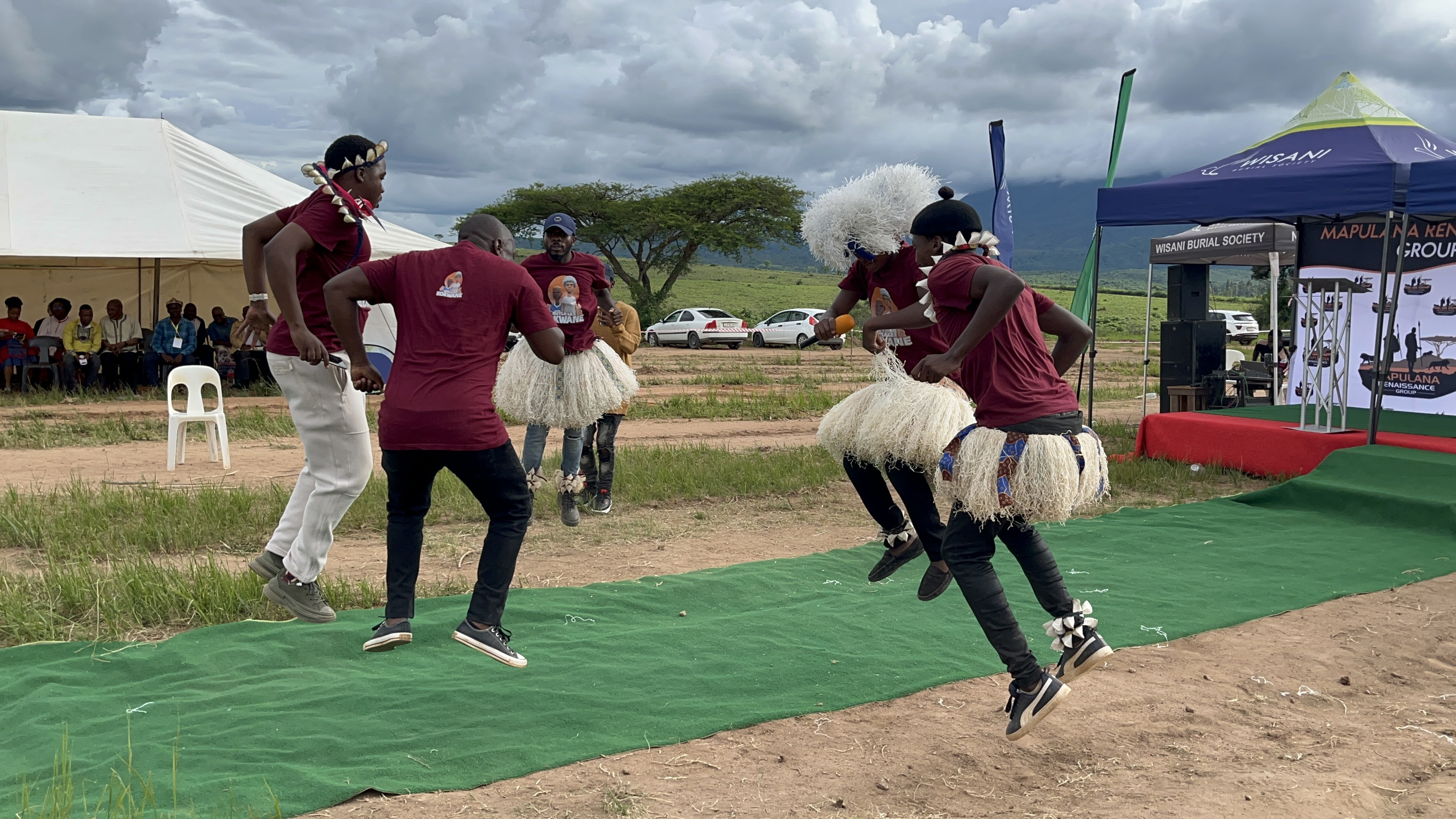

=== Medicine ===
Traditional medicine has been and still is a specialty of Mapulana. This could be attributed to the rich subtropical climate of Mapulaneng, which allows herbs to grow in abundance. Traditional medicine is dispensed by Dingaka (traditional doctors). To become a traditional doctor, one has to undergo rigorous and lengthy training under a Gobela (Guru). A traditional doctor-in-training is called a letwasane (Sangoma). Rainmaking was also Mapulana's specialty.

=== Initiation ===
Mapulana initiate their youth into womanhood and manhood. The initiation school (koma) is held in winter (mid June to mid August). The practices of initiation schools are marked by secrecy. Boys who have undergone initiation together will belong to the same mphato/moroto (regiment). An elaborate system is in place to distinguish a regiment from another based on when the regiment was initiated. The uninitiated cannot "visit" an initiation school when it is in session. The names of Mephato ya Badika are Matuba, Mangana, Magakwa, Madingwane, Mankwe, Maakwa, Madisha, Makgola, Madikwa, Manala, and Magolopo. As can be expected, women do not have regiments.

=== Clan system ===
Mapulana have a class system, known as Dikgoro (Clans, lit. "kraals"). There are those who come from Kgorong e kgolo (higher clan) or Kgorong ye nyana (lower clan). Those from Kgorong e Kgolo are of royal blood or are born from the senior wife and are expected to be dikata-pele (leaders) during initiation ceremonies. This system is also used in the go loma maraka (festival of the first harvest) and during the planting season.

The primary Clanships of the MaPulana are bagaMashego, bagaMalele, bagaMogane, bagaChiloane, bagaNonyane, and bagaMashile. Both Mashego and Malele are chiefs in the Bushbuckridge area, Chiloane is the chief in the Acornhoek and Pilgrem's Rest areas; Mogane and Nonyane in the Graskop and Sabie areas; and BagaMashile in the Matibidi to Lydenburg areas. Mapulana have two senior chiefs, BagaChiloane and Mashego Masoyi.

=== Marriage ===
A boy's family used to identify a family from which a boy was supposed to marry. The boy then wooed the girl who meets his fancy in that chosen family. In some cases the boy identified his own girl. For all purposes, the marriage was arranged as the families gave their blessings behind the scenes. The boy's family negotiated on dikgomo tsa bogadi which had to be paid to the girl's family. Polygamy was practiced. The first wife and her offspring held a higher status. The inheritance passed through the first wife before being passed to the junior wife and her offspring.

=== Naming ===
When children are born "ba ya relela" (they get the name of their ancestor). When somebody's name is Thadishe, for instance, he may well be Thadishe the 6th. The paternal grandmothers and aunts know which name to grant a child. This was usually done after consulting with the Ngaka who will tell them who is being reincarnated by the child's birth. When a baby is sleepless or sickly, he/she is pointed to the moon by his grandmother or aunt. The grandmother will chant out: "mogwera wa go ke yela, gola o reme diphate, o tshware lerumo or lwe dintwa!" (There is your friend/ Your friend is the moon, grow and cut trees (for wood), grow, pick up the spears and fight wars!). In essence, grow and be strong.

=== Livestock ===
Leruo (livestock) and Mashemo (land under cultivation) used to distinguish a rich man from a poor man. Land belonged to all the residents of an area and the Chief allocated the cultivation space. Grazing land was communal. The land tenure system of Mapulana was that land could not be bought or sold. Dipholwane (game) was hunted for food, medicinal or ceremonial purposes.

=== Calendar ===
The calendar of Mapulana works in lunar months, with the dawning of the full moon being the first day of the month. In SePulane the word kgwedi (moon) also means month. The shape and brightness of the moon can be read to determine when rains are going to fall. The year starts when the first rains start in September or when plants start to bloom. Therefore, September is the New Year.

The New Year heralds the start of planting season for crops that yield the staple foods of Mapulana. Planting used to be done according to the family's seniority, dikgoro tse kgolo starting first and others junior clans follow. Mabele (maize and millet) get planted first, Dintlu (jugobeans) last. Other crops like Mjumbula (cassava), Mathape (colocasia), Matlapala etc. being planted at any time of the year.

When plants are ready for harvesting, the elder of a clan will pick a small selection of the harvest. He or she will call out the names of the ancestors and dedicate the harvest to them. Every member of that clan will be made to nibble from the small pickings. This will be the festival of the first harvest. It is strongly forbidden to eat any picking unless these processes called go loma (to nibble) was done.

== Etymology and symbolism ==
The name Mapulana refers to a common ancestor named Lepulana, his name referring to legendary accounts of his rainmaking abilities. Lepulana was also known as Chiloane.

The totem symbol of the MaPulana is the lion. The tribal praise poem goes as follows:

Eastern Sotho (SePulana Subgroup)

Re batau a phaga a Malala a moenyane.

Batho ba ba boyang Phageng, ba ba boyang Shakwaneng.

Shakwana la kgomo le motho go phalang?

Go phala motho gobane kgomo re lla re djia.

English translation

"We are the people of the lion, of the wild cat of Malala of moenyane.

We are people from Phageng, we are people from Shakwaneng.

Which is more important, the reed of cattle or that of a human?

A human is better since with cattle we eat them all the time.

== Territory ==
Most MaPulana live in the area from Hoedspruit to Hazyview and their surrounds. This greater area is often referred to as "Mapulaneng" which means "Place of the people of Pulana (Lepulana)". Their ancestral lands historically stretched from Olifants River (Lepelle) in the north east and Tubatse in the Northwest territory where it borders with the BaPedi, in the west Mapulaneng border is in the western part of Dullstroom (Seokodibeng) running through to the south to Caroline (Shakwaneng). In the south Mapulaneng borders with Swaziland. In the east the border is thaba ya Lebopo (Lebombo mountain)

There are also a significant number of MaPulana living in Mabopane, Winterveld and Klipgat north west of Pretoria as well as in Daveyton east of Johannesburg where there is a street named after the MaPulana. Other Villages of Mapulana include Chochocho, Lilydale, Cottondale, Dwarsloop, Mariti, Mgandusweni, Manyeleti, Lephong, Ga-Boelang, Moloro, Matibidi, Leroro, Greenvalley, GaJosefa, Jerusalema, Oakley, Rolle, Wales.

== Notable people ==
- Nicolette Mashile
- Surprise Moriri
- Katlego Mashego
- Lebo Mashile
- Letago Madiba
- Ronald Lamola
- Penny Lebyane
- Michael Manzini
