= Oral Bible translation =

Oral Bible Translation (OBT) is a method of translating the Bible that emphasizes spoken communication rather than written texts. It is primarily used in communities where oral traditions are the dominant mode of learning and transmission. Drawing on insights from multimodality and performance criticism, the process typically involves teams who render passages aloud, test them through dialogue and storytelling, and adapt them to local forms of performance such as song, poetry, or narrative. OBT highlights features of the biblical texts that lend themselves to oral presentation, including rhythm, repetition, and dialogue. The approach is intended to make the Bible accessible to audiences who may not read or write, while also reflecting the oral-aural qualities inherent in the source texts.

Oral Bible Translations have been created in languages such as Miship (Nigeria), Sepulana (South Africa), and American English.
