= Manzini (disambiguation) =

Manzini may refer to:

- Manzini, Eswatini, a town in the Manzini Region of Eswatini
- Manzini Region, a region of Eswatini
- Manzini (surname), an Italian surname

== See also ==
- Roman Catholic Diocese of Manzini
