= South African braille =

Braille alphabets used in South Africa

Several braille alphabets are used in South Africa. For English, Unified English Braille has been adopted. Nine other languages have been written in braille: Afrikaans, Ndebele, Sesotho, Northern Sotho, Swazi, Tswana, Venda, Xhosa, and Zulu. All print alphabets are restricted to the basic Latin alphabet, with diacritics in some cases; the braille alphabets are likewise basic braille with additional letters to render the diacritics.

Basic braille alphabet
| ⠁ (braille pattern dots-1) | ⠃ (braille pattern dots-12) | ⠉ (braille pattern dots-14) | ⠙ (braille pattern dots-145) | ⠑ (braille pattern dots-15) | ⠋ (braille pattern dots-124) | ⠛ (braille pattern dots-1245) | ⠓ (braille pattern dots-125) | ⠊ (braille pattern dots-24) | ⠚ (braille pattern dots-245) | ⠅ (braille pattern dots-13) | ⠇ (braille pattern dots-123) | ⠍ (braille pattern dots-134) |
| a | b | c | d | e | f | g | h | i | j | k | l | m |
| ⠝ (braille pattern dots-1345) | ⠕ (braille pattern dots-135) | ⠏ (braille pattern dots-1234) | ⠟ (braille pattern dots-12345) | ⠗ (braille pattern dots-1235) | ⠎ (braille pattern dots-234) | ⠞ (braille pattern dots-2345) | ⠥ (braille pattern dots-136) | ⠧ (braille pattern dots-1236) | ⠺ (braille pattern dots-2456) | ⠭ (braille pattern dots-1346) | ⠽ (braille pattern dots-13456) | ⠵ (braille pattern dots-1356) |
| n | o | p | q | r | s | t | u | v | w | x | y | z |

The Nguni languages – Ndebele, Swazi, Xhosa, and Zulu – have no diacritics and will not be discussed further. The braille diacritics are shared by South African languages and are described in the sections that follow.

Punctuation for all South African braille alphabets is as in English Braille.

== Afrikaans Braille ==
Afrikaans Braille
- Script type: alphabet
- Print basis: Afrikaans alphabet
- Languages: Afrikaans

Related scripts
- Parent systems: Braille: South African; Afrikaans Braille

Afrikaans has braille cells for acute, ⠈; grave, ⠘⠡; circumflex, ⠘; and diaeresis, ⠰:

⠈⠁ á, ⠈⠑ é, ⠈⠊ í, ⠈⠕ ó, ⠈⠥ ú, ⠈⠽ ý
⠘⠡⠁ à, ⠘⠡⠑ è
⠘⠑ ê, ⠘⠊ î, ⠘⠕ ô, ⠘⠥ û
⠰⠑ ë, ⠰⠊ ï, ⠰⠕ ö, ⠰⠥ ü

== Sesotho and Tswana Braille ==
Sotho Braille Tswana Braille
- Script type: alphabet
- Print basis: Sesotho alphabet Tswana alphabet
- Languages: Sesotho, Northern Sotho, Tswana

Related scripts
- Parent systems: Braille: South African; Sotho Braille

Sesotho and Tswana treat the caron (haček) as an acute:

⠘⠑ ê, ⠘⠕ ô, :⠈⠎ š

== Venda Braille ==
Venda Braille
- Script type: alphabet
- Languages: Venda

Related scripts
- Parent systems: Braille: South African; Venda Braille

Venda has a unique letter, ⠨, for the subscript circumflex, and treats ṅ as acute:

⠨⠙ ḓ, ⠨⠇ ḽ, ⠨⠝ ṋ, ⠈⠝ ṅ, ⠨⠞ ṱ
