= Diboko =

Seboko (plural diboko), in the Sotho–Tswana languages, refers to the name of clan or family.
