= Michael Manzini =

South African soccer player

Mike Manzini
Personal information
- Full name: Michael Jethro Manzini
- Date of birth: 29 November 1972 (age 53)
- Place of birth: Hoedspruit, South Africa
- Height: 1.78 m (5 ft 10 in)
- Position: Defender

Youth career
- Welverdiend Eastern Rangers
- –1995: Might FC

Senior career*
Years	Team	Apps	(Gls)
1995–2009	Mamelodi Sundowns	274	(3)

International career^{‡}
1999	South Africa	3	(0)
- * Club domestic league appearances and goals as of 13 February 2012 ‡ National team caps and goals as of 13 February 2007

Mike Manzini (born 29 November 1972 in Hoedspruit, Limpopo) is a South African former association football defender. He spent his entire career at Premier Soccer League club Mamelodi Sundowns and also played for South Africa.

Manzini was Sundowns' captain who made well over 250 appearances for the club. His work in defence often went unnoticed, but it was a sign of his experience, composure and reading of the play that he very rarely found himself having to make a last-gasp tackle or clearance.

== See also ==
- List of one-club men in association football
