= Lozi language =

Bantu language spoken in southern Africa

Lozi
- Rozi
- Silozi
- Native to: Botswana • Namibia • Zambia
- Region: Western Zambia • Zambezi Region
- Native speakers: (725,000 cited 1982–2010 censuses)
- Language family: Niger–Congo?: Atlantic–Congo; Volta-Congo; Benue–Congo; Bantoid; Southern Bantoid; Bantu; Southern Bantu; Sotho–Tswana; Lozi
- Writing system: Latin (Lozi alphabet); Zambian Braille; Ditema tsa Dinoko

Official status
- Recognised minority language in: Namibia; Zambia

Language codes
- ISO 639-2: loz
- ISO 639-3: loz
- Glottolog: lozi1239
- Guthrie code: K.20 (K.21)
- Linguasphere: 99-AUT-ef

Lozi
- Person: Mulozi
- People: Balozi
- Language: Silozi
- Country: Bulozi

A Lozi speaker, recorded in Namibia.

Lozi, also known as Silozi and Rozi, is a Bantu language of the Niger–Congo language family within the Sotho–Tswana branch of Zone S (S.30), that is spoken by the Lozi people, primarily in southwestern Zambia and in Namibia. The language is most closely related to Northern Sotho (Sesotho sa Leboa), Tswana (Setswana), Kgalagari (SheKgalagari) and Sotho (Sesotho/Southern Sotho). Lozi is sometimes written as Rotse. Silozi is the endonym (the name of the language used by its native speakers).

The origins of Silozi can be traced back to a mixture of languages, primarily Luyana and Kololo. The Luyana people migrated south from the Kingdom of Luba and Kingdom of Lunda in the Katanga area of the Congo River basin, either late in the 17th century or early in the 18th century. They settled on the floodplains of the upper Zambezi River in what is now western Zambia, where they established a kingdom called Barotseland or Bulozi.

In the 1830s, the Kololo people, originally from the area near Senekal, Free State province of South Africa, fled northwards to escape the Mfecane under King Shaka Zulu (died 1828). They employed tactics learned from the Zulu armies to conquer the Luyana on the Zambezi floodplains, imposing their rule and language. However, by 1864, the indigenous population revolted and overthrew the Kololo. By then, the original Luyana language had largely been replaced by a new hybrid language, Silozi.

Today, Silozi is spoken in Namibia and Zambia.

== Phonology ==
Lozi has 5 vowels:

Vowels
	Front	Central	Back
High	i		u
Mid	e		o
Low		a	

20 consonants are in Lozi:

Consonants
		Labial	Alveolar	Palatal/ Postalveolar	Velar	Glottal
Nasal		m	n	ɲ	ŋ	
Plosive	voiceless	p	t	c	k	
Plosive	voiced	b	d	ɟ	ɡ	
Fricative	voiceless	f	s	ʃ		h
Fricative	voiced		z			
Approximant			l	j	w	

Tone is marked as high or low.

== Orthography ==
Lozi uses the Latin script, which was introduced by missionaries. In 1977, Zambia standardised the language's orthography.

Letters (upper case)	A	B	C	CH	D	E	F	G	H	I	J	K	L	M	N	Ñ	O	P	S	SH	T	U	W	Y	Z
Letters (lower case)	a	b	c	ch	d	e	f	g	h	i	j	k	l	m	n	ñ	o	p	s	sh	t	u	w	y	z
IPA	[a]	[b]	[tʃ]		[d]	[e], [ɛ], [ɪ]	[f]	[x]	[h]	[i]	[dʒ]	[k]	[l]	[m]	[n]	[ɲ]	[o], [ʊ], [ɔ]	[p]	[s]	[ʃ]	[t]	[u]	[w]	[j]	[z]

== Vocabulary ==
Months of the year in Silozi
Silozi	English
Sope	January
Yowa	February
Liatamanyi	March
Lungu	April
Kandao	May
Mbuwana	June
Sikulu	July
Muyana	August
Muimunene	September
Yenda	October
Njimwana	November
Ñulule	December

Counting numbers in Silozi

1 kalikamu

2 totubeli

3 totulalu

4 totune

5 ketalizoho

6 silezi

7 supile

8 ketalizoho ni totulalu

9 ketalizoho ni totune

10 lishumi

20 mashumi a mabeli

30 mashumi a malalu

40 mashumi a mane

50 mashumi a ketalizoho

60 mashumi a silezi

70 mashumi a supile

80 mashumi a supile ni kalikamu

90 mashumi a supile ni totubeli

100 muanda

== Silozi text ==
The following is a sample text in Silozi.

Silozi: Kakuli Mulimu U latile hahulu batu ba lifasi, mane U ba file Mwan'a Hae wa libanda kuli mutu ufi ni ufi ya lumela ku Yena a si ke a shwa, kono a be ni bupilo bo bu sa feli. Joani 3:16

English: For God so loved the world that He gave His only begotten Son, that whoever believes in Him should not perish but have everlasting life. John 3:16
