= Sotho–Tswana languages =

Bantu language group of southern Africa

Sotho–Tswana
- Geographic distribution: Southern Africa, mainly in South Africa, Lesotho, Botswana, and south-western Zambia,
- Ethnicity: Sotho-Tswana peoples
- Linguistic classification: Niger–Congo?: Atlantic–Congo; Volta-Congo; Benue–Congo; Bantoid; Southern Bantoid; Bantu; Southern Bantu; Sotho–Tswana
- Subdivisions: Setswana; Northern Sotho; Southern Sotho; Lozi

Language codes
- Glottolog: soth1248

The Sotho-Tswana languages are a group of closely related Bantu languages spoken in Southern Africa. The Sotho-Tswana group corresponds to the S.30 label in Guthrie's 1967–71 classification of languages in the Bantu family.

The various dialects of Tswana, Southern Sotho and Northern Sotho are highly mutually intelligible. On more than one occasion, proposals have been put forward to create a unified standardisation and declare a Sotho-Tswana language.

== Languages ==
The group is divided into four main branches:

- Sotho-Tswana
  - S.31
    - Tswana (Setswana), with dialects: Fokeng, Hurutshe, Kgatla, Kwena, Lete, Ngwaketse, Ngwato, Rolong, Tawana, Tlhaping, Tlharo, and Tlokwa
  - S.311
    - Kgalagadi, with dialects: Nuclear Kgalagadi (Kgalagadi proper), Balaongwe, Kenyi, Khakhae, Koma, Ngologa, Pedi, Phaleng, Rhiti, Shaga, and Siwane
  - S.32
    - Birwa
    - Tswapong
    - Northern Sotho (Sesotho sa Leboa), with dialects including Masemola (Masemula, Tau), Kgaga (Khaga, Kxaxa), Koni (Kone), Tswene (Tsweni), Gananwa (Hananwa, Xananwa), Pulana, Phalaborwa (Phalaburwa, Thephalaborwa), Khutswe (Khutswi, Kutswe), Lobedu (Khelobedu, Lovedu, Lubedu), Tlokwa (Dogwa, Tlokoa, Tokwa), Pai, Dzwabo (Thabine-Roka-Nareng), Kopa (Ndebele-Sotho), Matlala-Moletshi.
  - S.33
    - Southern Sotho or Sotho (SeSotho): Phuthi, Taung

Northern Sotho, which appears largely to be a taxonomic holding category for what is Sotho-Tswana but neither identifiably Southern Sotho nor Tswana, subsumes highly varied dialects including Pedi (Sepedi), Tswapo (Setswapo), Lovedu (Khilobedu), Pai and Pulana. Maho (2002) leaves the "East Sotho" varieties of Kutswe, Pai, and Pulana unclassified within Sotho-Tswana.

== Sample ==
The Lord's Prayer in the various Sotho-Tswana languages.

English: Our Father in heaven, hallowed be your name, your kingdom come, your will be done, on earth as it is in heaven.

- Pedi: Tatewešo wa magodimong, leina la gago a le kgethwe, mmušo wa gago a o tle, thato ya gago a e dirwe mo lefaseng bjalo ka ge e dirwa legodimong.
- Sotho: Ntata rona ya mahodimong, lebitso la hao le halaletswe, ho tle muso wa hao, thato ya hao e etswe lefatseng, jwalo ka ha e etswa lehodimong.
- Tswana: Rara wa rona yo o kwa legodimong, leina la gago a le itshepisiwe, puso ya gago a e tle, thato ya gago a e dirwe mo lefatsheng jaaka kwa legodimong.
- Lozi: Ndat’a luna ya kwa lihalimu, libizo la hao li be le li kenile. Ku tahe mubuso wa hao. Se si latwa ki wena si ezwe mwa lifasi, sina mo si ezezwa mwa lihalimu.
