= Sotho language =

Southern Bantu language of Lesotho and neighbouring countries

Sotho
- Southern Sotho
- Sesotho
- Pronunciation: [sɪ̀sʊ́tʰʊ̀]
- Native to: Lesotho; South Africa; Zimbabwe
- Ethnicity: Basotho
- Native speakers: (5.6 million cited 2001–2011); 7.9 million L2 speakers in South Africa (2002)
- Language family: Niger–Congo?: Atlantic–Congo; Volta-Congo; Benue–Congo; Bantoid; Southern Bantoid; Bantu; Southern Bantu; Sotho–Tswana; Sotho
- Dialects: Phuthi; Taung
- Writing system: Latin (Sesotho alphabet); Sotho Braille; Ditema tsa Dinoko
- Signed forms: Signed Sotho

Official status
- Official language in: Lesotho; South Africa; Zimbabwe
- Regulated by: Pan South African Language Board

Language codes
- ISO 639-1: st
- ISO 639-2: sot
- ISO 639-3: sot
- Glottolog: sout2807
- Guthrie code: S.33
- Linguasphere: 99-AUT-ee incl. varieties 99-AUT-eea to 99-AUT-eee
- Proportion of the South African population that speaks Sotho at home 0–20% 20–40% 40–60% 60–80% 80–100%

Sotho
- Person: Mosotho
- People: Basotho
- Language: Sesotho
- Country: Lesotho

Sotho (/ˈsuːtuː/), also known as Sesotho (/sɪˈsuːtuː, sə-/) (Note: Also spelled Suthio, or Suthu, Souto, Sisutho, Sutu, or Sesutu.), Southern Sotho, or Sesotho sa Borwa, is a Southern Bantu language spoken in Lesotho, as its national language, and South Africa, where it is an official language.

Like all Bantu languages, Sotho is an agglutinative language, using numerous affixes and derivational and inflexional rules to build complete words.

== Classification ==
Sotho is a Southern Bantu language, belonging to the Niger–Congo language family, and is in the Sotho–Tswana branch of Zone S (S.30).

"Sotho" is also the name given to the entire Sotho-Tswana group, in which case Sesotho proper is called "Southern Sotho". Within the Sotho–Tswana group Southern Sotho is also related to Lozi (Silozi) with which it forms the Sesotho–Lozi group within Sotho-Tswana.

The Northern Sotho group is geographical, and includes a number of dialects also closely related to Sotho–Lozi. Tswana is also known as "Western Sesotho".

The Sotho-Tswana group is in turn closely related to the other Southern Bantu languages, including Venda, Tsonga, Tonga, Lozi, and Nguni from neighboring Southern African countries, and possibly also the Makua languages of Tanzania and Mozambique.

Sotho is the root word. Various prefixes may be added for specific derivations, such as Sesotho for the Sotho language and Basotho for the Sotho people. Use of Sesotho rather than Sotho for the language in English has seen increasing use since the 1980s, especially in South African English and in Lesotho.

== Dialects ==
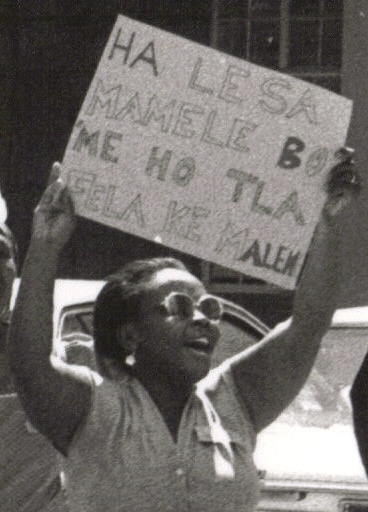
A Mosotho woman holding up a sign protesting violence against women, written in her native Sesotho language, at a National Women's Day protest at the National University of Lesotho. The sign translates: "If you do not listen to women, we will lose patience with you." (2008)

Except for faint lexical variation within Lesotho, and for marked lexical variation between the Lesotho/Free State variety and that of the large urban townships to the north (such as Soweto) due to heavy borrowing from neighbouring languages, there is no discernible dialect variation in this language.

However, one point that seems to often confuse authors who attempt to study the dialectology of Sesotho is the term Basotho, which can variously mean "Sotho–Tswana speakers", "Southern Sotho and Northern Sotho speakers", "Sesotho speakers", and "residents of Lesotho." The Nguni language Phuthi has been heavily influenced by Sesotho; its speakers have mixed Nguni and Sotho–Tswana ancestry. It seems that it is sometimes treated erroneously as a dialect of Sesotho called "Sephuthi." However, Phuthi is mutually unintelligible with standard Sesotho and thus cannot in any sense be termed a dialect of it.

Additionally, being derived from a language or dialect very closely related to modern Sesotho, (Note: To the extent that it even has several words that resemble Sesotho words with clicks: ku kala to begin (Sesotho ho qala [hʊǃɑlɑ]) ku kabana to quarrel (Sesotho ho qabana [hʊǃɑbɑnɑ]), one could just as easily say that these words were imported from Nguni languages (ukuqala and ukuxabana, which is where the Sesotho versions come from), and the language does also contain words resembling click words from Nguni but not from Sesotho (such as ku kabanga to think, cf. Zulu ukucabanga).) the Zambian Sotho–Tswana language Lozi is also sometimes cited as a modern dialect of Sesotho named Serotse or Sekololo.

The oral history of the Basotho and Northern Sotho peoples (as contained in their liboko) states that 'Mathulare, a daughter of the chief of the Bafokeng nation (an old and respected people), was married to chief Tabane of the (Southern) Bakgatla (a branch of the Bahurutse, who are one of the most ancient of the Sotho–Tswana tribes), and bore the founders of five tribes: Bapedi (by Mopedi), Makgolokwe (by Kgetsi), Baphuthing (by Mophuthing, and later the Mzizi of Dlamini, connected with the present-day Ndebele), Batlokwa (by Kgwadi), and Basia (by Mosia). These were the first peoples to be called "Basotho", before many of their descendants and other peoples came together to form Moshoeshoe I's nation in the early 19th century. The situation is even further complicated by various historical factors, such as members of parent clans joining their descendants or various clans calling themselves by the same names (because they honour the same legendary ancestor or have the same totem).

An often repeated story is that when the modern Basotho nation was established by King Moshoeshoe I, his own "dialect" Sekwena was chosen over two other popular variations Setlokwa and Setaung and that these two still exist as "dialects" of modern Sesotho. The inclusion of Setlokwa in this scenario is confusing, as the modern language named "Setlokwa" is a Northern Sesotho language spoken by descendants of the same Batlokwa whose attack on the young chief Moshoeshoe's settlement during Lifaqane (led by the famous widow Mmanthatisi) caused them to migrate to present-day Lesotho. On the other hand, Doke & Mofokeng claims that the tendency of many Sesotho speakers to say for example ke ronngwe [kʼɪʀʊŋ̩ŋʷe] instead of ke romilwe [kʼɪʀuˌmilʷe] when forming the perfect of the passive of verbs ending in -ma [mɑ] (as well as forming their perfects with -mme [m̩me] instead of -mile [mile]) is "a relic of the extinct Tlokwa dialect".

== Geographic distribution ==
Geographical distribution of Sotho in South Africa: density of Sotho home-language speakers.: <1 /km²; 1–3 /km²; 3–10 /km²; 10–30 /km²; 30–100 /km²; 100–300 /km²; 300–1000 /km²; 1000–3000 /km²; >3000 /km²

According to the South African National Census of 2011, there were almost four million first language Sesotho speakers recorded in South Africa – approximately eight per cent of the population. Most Sesotho speakers in South Africa reside in Free State and Gauteng. Sesotho is also the main language spoken by the people of Lesotho, where, according to 1993 data, it was spoken by about 1,493,000 people, or 85% of the population. The census fails to record other South Africans for whom Sesotho is a second or third language. Such speakers are found in all major residential areas of Metropolitan Municipalities – such as Johannesburg, and the Vaal Triangle – where multilingualism and polylectalism are very high.

=== Official status ===
Sesotho is one of the twelve official languages of South Africa, one of the two official languages of Lesotho and one of the sixteen official languages of Zimbabwe.

== Derived languages ==
Sesotho is one of the many languages from which tsotsitaals are derived. Tsotsitaal is not a proper language, as it is primarily a unique vocabulary and a set of idioms but used with the grammar and inflexion rules of another language (usually Sesotho or Zulu). It is a part of the youth culture in most Southern Gauteng townships and is the primary language used in Kwaito music.

== Phonology ==
The sound system of Sesotho is unusual in many respects. It has ejective consonants, click consonants, a uvular trill, a relatively large number of affricate consonants, no prenasalised consonants, and a rare form of vowel-height (alternatively, advanced tongue root) harmony. In total, the language contains some 39 consonantal (Note: 75 if you include the labialized consonants.) and 9 vowel phonemes.

It also has a large number of complex sound transformations which often change the phones of words due to the influence of other (sometimes elided) sounds.

=== Consonants ===
		Labial	Alveolar		Post- alveolar	Palatal	Velar	Uvular	Glottal
		Labial	median	lateral	Post- alveolar	Palatal	Velar	Uvular	Glottal
Click	glottalized				ᵏǃʼ				
Click	aspirated				ᵏǃʰ				
Click	nasal				ᵑǃ				
Nasal		m	n		ɲ		ŋ		
Plosive	ejective	pʼ	tʼ				kʼ		
Plosive	aspirated	pʰ	tʰ				kʰ		
Plosive	voiced	b	(d)^{1}						
Affricate	ejective		tsʼ	tɬʼ	tʃʼ				
Affricate	aspirated		tsʰ	tɬʰ	tʃʰ		kxʰ ~ x		
Continuant	voiceless	f	s	ɬ	ʃ		kxʰ ~ x		h ~ ɦ
Continuant	voiced		r	l	ʒ ~ dʒ	j	w	ʀ	h ~ ɦ

1. [d] is an allophone of /l/, occurring only before the close vowels (/i/ and /u/). Dialectical evidence shows that in the Sotho–Tswana languages /l/ was originally pronounced as a retroflex flap [ɽ] before the two close vowels.

Sesotho makes a three-way distinction between lightly ejective, aspirated and voiced stops in several places of articulation.

The standard Sesotho post-alveolar clicks tend to be substituted with dental clicks in regular speech.

=== Vowels ===
The vowel system in Sesotho is as follows:

	Front	Near-back	Back
close	i		u
near-close	ɪ		ʊ
close-mid	e		o
open-mid	ɛ		ɔ
open		ɑ	

== Grammar ==
The most striking properties of Sesotho grammar, and the most important properties which reveal it as a Bantu language, are its noun gender and concord systems. The grammatical gender system does not encode sex gender, and indeed, Bantu languages in general are not grammatically marked for gender.

Another well-known property of the Bantu languages is their agglutinative morphology. Additionally, they tend to lack any grammatical case systems, indicating noun roles almost exclusively through word order.

== See also ==
- Sotho calendar
- Sotho people
- South African Translators' Institute

== Sources ==
- Batibo, H. M., Moilwa, J., and Mosaka N. 1997. The historical implications of the linguistic relationship between Makua and Sotho languages. In PULA Journal of African Studies, vol. 11, no. 1
- Doke, C. M., and Mofokeng, S. M. 1974. Textbook of Southern Sotho Grammar. Cape Town: Longman Southern Africa, 3rd. impression. ISBN 0-582-61700-6.
- Ntaoleng, B. S. 2004. Sociolinguistic variation in spoken and written Sesotho: A case study of speech varieties in Qwaqwa. M.A. thesis. University of South Africa.
- Tšiu, W. M. 2001. Basotho family odes (Diboko) and oral tradition. M.A. thesis. University of South Africa
