= Tswana language =

Bantu language of Botswana and South Africa

Tswana
- Setswana
- Native to: Botswana; South Africa
- Ethnicity: Batswana
- Native speakers: (4.1 million in South Africa (2011); 1.1 million in Botswana cited 1993) unknown numbers in Namibia and Zimbabwe; 2.7 million L2 speakers in South Africa (2002)
- Language family: Niger–Congo?: Atlantic–Congo; Volta-Congo; Benue–Congo; Bantoid; Southern Bantoid; Bantu; Southern Bantu; Sotho–Tswana; Tswana
- Dialects: Rolong; Hurutshe; Kwena; Lete; Melete; Ngwaketse; Ngwatu; Kgatla; Tawana; Tlharo; Tlhaping; Thlahaping; Thlaro; Pretoria Sotho
- Writing system: Latin (Tswana alphabet); Tswana Braille; Ditema tsa Dinoko

Official status
- Official language in: Botswana; South Africa; Zimbabwe
- Recognised minority language in: Namibia

Language codes
- ISO 639-1: tn
- ISO 639-2: tsn
- ISO 639-3: tsn
- Glottolog: tswa1253
- Linguasphere: 99-AUT-eg

Tswana
- Person: Motswana
- People: Batswana
- Language: Setswana
- Country: Botswana

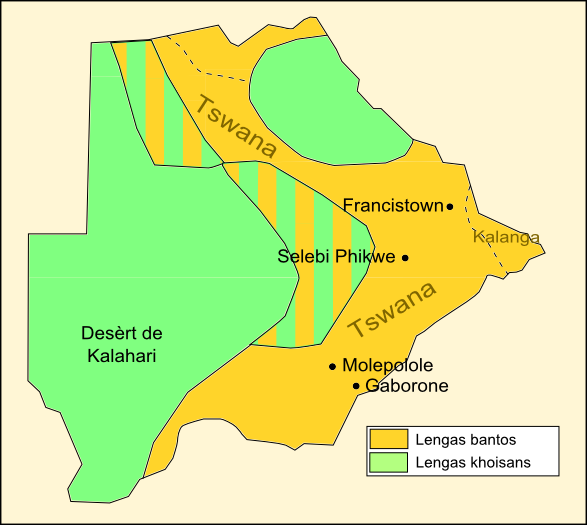
Distribution of Tswana (in yellow) in Botswana

Geographical distribution of Tswana in South Africa: proportion of the population that speaks Tswana at home. 0–20% 20–40% 40–60% 60–80% 80–100%

Geographical distribution of Setswana in South Africa: density of Setswana home-language speakers. <1 /km² 1–3 /km² 3–10 /km² 10–30 /km² 30–100 /km² 100–300 /km² 300–1000 /km² 1000–3000 /km² >3000 /km²

Tswana, also known by its native name Setswana, (Note: Also spelled SeTswana; archaically spelled Sechuana) is a Bantu language indigenous to Southern Africa and spoken by about 8.2 million people. It is closely related to the Sepedi and Sesotho languages, as well as the Sekgaladi and likely the Silozi language.

Tswana is an official language of South Africa and Zimbabwe. It is a lingua franca in Botswana and parts of South Africa, particularly North West Province. Setswana speaking ethnic groups are found in several provinces of South Africa, primarily in the North West, where about four million people speak the language. An urbanised variety is known as Sepitori, and is the principal unique language of the city of Pretoria. The three South African provinces with the most speakers are Gauteng (circa 11%), Northern Cape, and North West (over 70%). Until 1994, South African Batswana were notionally citizens of Bophuthatswana, one of the bantustans of the apartheid regime. The Setswana language in the Northwest Province has variations in which it is spoken according to the ethnic groups found in the Tswana culture (Bakgatla, Barolong, Bakwena, Batlhaping, Bahurutshe, Bafokeng, Batlokwa, Bataung, and Batswapong, among others); the written language remains the same. A small number of speakers are also found in Zimbabwe (unknown number) and Namibia (about 10,000 people).

== History ==
The first European to describe the language was the German traveller Hinrich Lichtenstein, who lived among a Batswana tribe known as Batlhaping in 1806 although his work was not published until 1930. He mistakenly regarded Setswana as a dialect of the isiXhosa, and the name that he used for the language "Beetjuana" may also have covered Sepedi and Sesotho.

The first major work on Tswana was carried out by the British missionary Robert Moffat, who had also lived among the Batlhaping, and published Bechuana Spelling Book and A Bechuana Catechism in 1826. In the following years, he published several books of the Bible, and in 1857, he was able to publish a complete translation of the Bible.

The first grammar of Setswana was published in 1833 by the missionary James Archbell although it was modelled on isiXhosa grammar. The first grammar of Setswana which regarded it as a separate language from isiXhosa (but still not as a separate language from the Sepedi and Sesotho) was published by the French missionary, E. Casalis in 1841. He changed his mind later, and in a publication from 1882, he noted that Sepedi and Sesotho were distinct from Setswana.

Solomon Plaatje, a South African intellectual and linguist, was one of the first writers to extensively write in and about the Tswana language.

== Phonology ==
=== Vowels ===
The vowel inventory of Setswana can be seen below.

	Front	Back
Close	i ⟨i⟩	u ⟨u⟩
Near-close	ɪ ⟨e⟩	ʊ ⟨o⟩
Open-mid	ɛ ⟨ê⟩	ɔ ⟨ô⟩
Open	a ⟨a⟩	

Some dialects have two additional vowels, the close-mid vowels /e/ and /o/. The circumflex on e and o in general Setswana writing is only encouraged at elementary levels of education and not at upper primary or higher; usually these are written without the circumflex.

=== Consonants ===
The consonant inventory of Setswana can be seen below.

		Labial	Alveolar			Palatal (-alveolar)	Velar	Uvular	Glottal
		Labial	plain	sibilant	lateral	Palatal (-alveolar)	Velar	Uvular	Glottal
Nasal		m ⟨m⟩	n ⟨n⟩			ɲ ⟨ny⟩	ŋ ⟨ng⟩		
Plosive/ Affricate	voiceless	p ⟨p⟩	t ⟨t⟩	ts ⟨ts⟩	tɬ ⟨tl⟩	tʃ ⟨tš⟩	k ⟨k⟩		
Plosive/ Affricate	aspirated	pʰ ⟨ph⟩	tʰ ⟨th⟩	tsʰ ⟨tsh⟩	tɬʰ ⟨tlh⟩	tʃʰ ⟨tšh⟩	kʰ ⟨kh⟩	kχʰ ⟨kg⟩	
Plosive/ Affricate	voiced	b ⟨b⟩	d ⟨d⟩			dʒ ⟨j⟩			
Fricative		f ⟨f⟩		s ⟨s⟩		ʃ ⟨š⟩		χ ⟨g⟩	h ⟨h⟩
Sonorant		w ⟨w⟩	r ⟨r⟩		l ⟨l⟩	j ⟨y⟩			

The consonant [d] is an allophone of /l/ when the latter is followed by the vowels /i/ or /u/. Two more sounds, v /v/ and z /z/, exist only in loanwords.

Setswana also has three click consonants, but these are only used in interjections or ideophones, and tend only to be used by the older generation, and are therefore falling out of use. The three click consonants are the dental click /ǀ/, orthographically ⟨c⟩; the lateral click /ǁ/, orthographically ⟨x⟩; and the alveolar click /ǃ/, orthographically ⟨q⟩. These are found for example in qô-qô (used to announce arrival or knocking on the door; being replaced by ko-ko), x-x (used to express annoyance) and c-c-c.

All nasal and liquid phonemes can be realized as syllabic consonants, which often occur as parts of geminate sequences. Syllabic consonants only occur in word-initial or word-medial positions, with the sole exception of /ŋ/, which may also appear word-finally (as in Jwaneng and Barolong Seboni).

There are some minor dialectal variations among the consonants between speakers of Setswana. For instance, /χ/ is realised as either /x/ or /h/ by many speakers; /f/ is realised as /h/ in most dialects; and /tɬ/ and /tɬʰ/ are realised as /t/ and /tʰ/ in northern dialects.

=== Stress ===
Stress is fixed in Tswana and thus always falls on the penult of a word, although some compounds may receive a secondary stress in the first part of the word. The syllable on which the stress falls is lengthened. Thus, mosadi (woman) is realised as [mʊ̀ˈsáːdì].

=== Tone ===
Tswana has two tones, high and low, but the latter has a much wider distribution in words than the former. Tones are not marked orthographically, which may lead to ambiguity.

go bua /χʊ búa/ "to speak"
go bua /χʊ bua/ "to skin an animal"

o bua Setswana /ʊ́búa setswána/ "You speak Setswana"
ke bua Setswana /kɪbúa setswána/ "I speak Setswana"

An important feature of the tones is the so-called spreading of the high tone. If a syllable bears a high tone, the following two syllables will have high tones unless they are at the end of the word.

simolola /símʊlʊla/ > /símʊ́lʊ́la/ "to begin"
simologêla /símʊlʊχɛla/ > /símʊ́lʊ́χɛla/ "to begin for/at"

== Orthography ==
Setswana orthography is based on the Latin alphabet.

Letter(s)	a	b	c	d	e	ê	f	g	h	i	j	k	l	m	n	o	ô	p	ph	q	r	s	š	t	th	tl	tlh	tsh	u	v	w	x	y	z

The letter š was introduced in 1937, but the corresponding sound is still sometimes written as ⟨sh⟩. The letters ⟨ê⟩ and ⟨ô⟩ are used in textbooks and language reference books, but not so much in daily standard writing.

== Grammar ==
=== Nouns ===
Nouns in Setswana are grouped into nine noun classes and one subclass, each having different prefixes. The nine classes and their respective prefixes can be seen below, along with a short note regarding the common characteristics of most nouns within their respective classes.

Class	Singular	Plural	Characteristics
1.	mo-	ba-	Persons
1a.	–	bô-	Names, kinship, animals
2.	mo-	me- ma-	Miscellaneous (including bodyparts, tools, instruments, animals, trees, plants)
3.	le-	ma-	Miscellaneous (including bodyparts, tools, instruments, animals, trees, plants)
4.	se-	di-	Miscellaneous (including bodyparts, tools, instruments, animals, trees, plants)
5.	n- m- ny- ng-	din- dim- diny- ding-	Animals (but also miscellaneous)
6.	lo-	din- dim- diny- ding-	Miscellaneous (including a number of collective nouns)
7.	bo-	ma-	Abstract nouns
8.	go-		Infinitive forms of verbs
9.	fa- go- mo-		Adverbs

Some nouns may be found in several classes. For instance, many class 1 nouns are also found in class 1a, class 3, class 4, and class 5.
