= Northern Sotho =

Sotho-Tswana language spoken in South Africa

- Sesotho sa Leboa
- Native to: South Africa
- Region: Limpopo, Gauteng, Mpumalanga
- Ethnicity: Bapedi; Lobedu; Tlôkwa
- Native speakers: 3.2 million (2022 Census); 9.1 million L2 speakers (2002)
- Language family: Niger–Congo?: Atlantic–Congo; Volta-Congo; Benue–Congo; Bantoid; Southern Bantoid; Bantu; Southern Bantu; Sotho–Tswana; Northern Sotho
- Early forms: Tswaniac: Hurutshe; Kgatla
- Writing system: Latin (Northern Sotho alphabet); Sotho Braille
- Signed forms: Signed Northern Sotho

Official status
- Official language in: South Africa
- Regulated by: Pan South African Language Board

Language codes
- ISO 639-2: nso
- ISO 639-3: Variously: nso – Sekone brl – Birwa two – Tswapong
- Glottolog: nort3233
- Guthrie code: S.32,301–304
- Linguasphere: 99-AUT-ed
- Geographical distribution of Northern Sotho in South Africa: proportion of the population that speaks a form of Northern Sotho at home. 0–20% 20–40% 40–60% 60–80% 80–100%

- Geographical distribution of Northern Sotho in South Africa: density of Northern Sotho home-language speakers <1 /km² 1–3 /km² 3–10 /km² 10–30 /km² 30–100 /km² 100–300 /km² 300–1000 /km² 1000–3000 /km² >3000 /km²

A speaker of the Northern Sotho language

Northern Sotho is one of South Africa's twelve official languages and belongs to the Bantu language family specifically the Sotho–Tswana group. The language is spoken mainly in Limpopo Province, and to a lesser extent in Gauteng, Mpumalanga, and North West.

Northern Sotho is the umbrella term for a group of certain dialects.

As of the 2022 South African Census, approximately 6.2 million people, or 10.0% of the national population, speak Northern Sotho as their first language. Northern Sotho ranks as the fifth most spoken first language.

== Official language status ==
=== Sepedi vs Northern Sotho ===
According to Chapter 1, Section 6 of the South African Constitution, Sepedi is one of South Africas 12 official languages. There has been significant debate about whether Northern Sotho should be used instead of Pedi. The English version of the South African Constitution lists Sepedi as an official language, while the Sepedi or Northern Sotho version of the Constitution of South Africa lists Sesotho sa Leboa as an official South African language. On 5 November 2025, PANSALB, the South African language Board adopted Sesotho sa Leboa as official Language replacing the narrow dialect of Sepedi. Sesotho sa Leboa covers 27 dialects of Northern Sotho such as: Selobedu, Setlokwa, Sepulana, Sehananwa, SeMatlala, SeMoletji, Sebirwa and Seroka.

=== South Africa's official language policy ===
South Africa's official language policy refers to the twelve official languages of South Africa (i.e., Sepedi, Sesotho, Setswana, siSwati, Tshivenda, Xitsonga, Afrikaans, isiNdebele, isiXhosa, isiZulu, English, and South African Sign Language (SASL)), as specified in the Constitution of the Republic of South Africa.

== Name ==
The written standard of Northern Sotho (Sesotho sa Leboa) was imposed by the apartheid regime, Sepedi is a language which was extensively documented by missionaries of the Berlin Missionary Society during the nineteenth century. Scholars generally acknowledge the contributions of missionaries such as Alexander Merensky, Carl Knothe, Grützner, and Gerlachshoop in developing an orthography and written tradition for the language. The resulting standardized writing system was later applied to numerous related Sotho-Tswana varieties spoken across the former Transvaal region. This has led to ongoing debate regarding the use of "Sepedi" as a label for the entire language, with speakers of other varieties, including Khelobedu (Lobedu), arguing that the broader designation "Northern Sotho" or "Sesotho sa Leboa" more accurately reflects the linguistic diversity of the language community. Recent studies have highlighted the sociolinguistic and identity-related implications of this naming controversy in post-apartheid South Africa.

== Other varieties of Northern Sotho ==
Northern Sotho can be subdivided into Highveld-Sotho and Pedi people, which consists of comparatively recent immigrants mostly from the west and southwest parts of South Africa, and Lowveld-Sotho, which consists of a combination of immigrants from the north of South Africa and Sotho inhabitants of longer standing. Like other Sotho-Tswana people, their languages are named after totemic animals and, sometimes, by alternating or combining these with the names of famous chiefs.

=== The Highveld-Sotho/Pedi ===
The group consists of the following dialects:

- Bapedi
  - Marota (in the narrower sense)
  - Batau (Matlebjane, Masemola, Marishane, Manganeng - Nkadimeng, Kgaphola, Diphofa, Nchabeleng, Mogashoa, Phaahla, Sloane, Mashegoana, Mphanama, Malata a Manyane)
  - Bakone
  - Baphuthi
  - Baroka
  - Bakgaga (Mphahlele, Maake, Mothapo)
  - Thobejane (Ga-Mafefe)
  - Batswapong
  - Batlokwa (Ba-bopedi)
  - Bapulana (not mapulana)
  - Batlou
- Chuene
- Mathabatha
- Maserumule
- Tlou (Ga-Molepo)
- Batlokwa
  - Batlokwa Ba Lethebe
- Makgoba
- Bahananwa (Ga-Mmalebogo)
- Moremi
- Motlhatlhana
- Babirwa
- Mmamabolo
- Bakwena ba Moletjie (Moloto)
- Batlhaloga
- Bahwaduba, BaGaMagale, and many others

=== The Lowveld-Sotho ===
The group consists of Lobedu, Narene, Phalaborwa (Malatji), Mogoboya, Kone, Kgaga, Ramafalo and Mohale.

== Classification ==
Northern Sotho is one of the Sotho languages of the Bantu family. Although Northern Sotho shares the name Sotho with Southern Sotho, the two groups also have a great deal in common with their sister language Setswana. Northern Sotho is also closely related to Setswana, sheKgalagari and siLozi. It is a standardized variety, amalgamating several distinct varieties or dialects. Northern Sotho is also spoken by the Mohlala people and Malata People.

Khelobedu is a written language. Lobedu is spoken by people in the Greater Tzaneen, Greater Letaba municipalities, and a minority in Greater Giyani municipality, as well as in the Limpopo Province and Tembisa township in Gauteng. Its speakers are known as the Balobedu.

== Writing system ==
Northern sotho is written in the Latin alphabet. The letter š is used to represent the sound [ʃ] ("sh" is used in the trigraph "tsh" to represent an aspirated ts sound). The circumflex accent can be added to the letters e and o to distinguish their different sounds, but it is mostly used in language reference books. Some word prefixes, especially in verbs, are written separately from the stem.

== Phonology ==
=== Vowels ===
Northern Sotho vowels
	Front	Back
Close	i	u
Close-mid	e	o
Open-mid	ɛ	ɔ
Open	a	

=== Consonants ===
Analysing Northern Sotho syllable structure as (C)(w)(V), one obtains the following consonant phonemes:

Northern Sotho consonants
		Labial			Alveolar		Palatal (-alveolar)	Velar	Glottal
		plain	alv.	post-alv.	plain	lateral	Palatal (-alveolar)	Velar	Glottal
Nasal		m			n		ɲ	ŋ	
Plosive	ejective (Note: In some dialects, the ejective plosives and affricates are instead articulated as voiced plosives and affricates respectively.)	pʼ			tʼ			kʼ	
Plosive	aspirated	pʰ			tʰ			kʰ	
Affricate	ejective			pʃʼ	tsʼ	tɬʼ	tʃʼ		
Affricate	aspirated		psʰ	pʃʰ	tsʰ	tɬʰ	tʃʰ	kxʰ	
Fricative	voiceless	f	fs	fʃ	s	ɬ	ʃ		h~ɦ
Fricative	voiced	β		βʒ			ʒ	ɣ	h~ɦ
Sonorant					r	l	j	w	

In addition, Louwrens, Kosch and Kotzé posit a neutral nasal archiphoneme /N/, which appears exclusively as a syllabic consonant in C syllables and assimilates to the place of articulation of the following syllable's onset.

Within nasal consonant compounds, the first nasal consonant sound is recognized as syllabic. Words such as nthuše "help me", are pronounced as [n̩tʰuʃe]. /n/ can also be pronounced as [ŋ] following a velar consonant.

Urban varieties of Northern Sotho, such as Pretoria Sotho (actually a derivative of Tswana, and Pedi), have acquired clicks in an ongoing process of such sounds spreading from Nguni languages.

=== Tones ===
Like most other Niger–Congo languages, Sesotho is a tonal language, spoken with two basic tones, high (H) and low (L).

== Vocabulary ==
Some examples of Northern Sotho words and phrases:

English	Northern Sotho
Welcome	Kamogelo (noun) / Amogela (verb)
Good day	Dumela (singular) / Dumelang (plural) / Thobela and Re a lotšha (to elders)
How are you?	O kae? (singular) Le kae? (plural, also used for elders)
I am fine	Ke gona. Ke tsogile(singular). Re tsogile(plural).
I am fine too, thank you	Le nna ke gona, ke a leboga.
Thank you	Ke a leboga (I thank you) / Re a leboga (we thank you)
Good luck	Mahlatse
Have a safe journey	O be le leeto le le bolokegilego
Good bye!	Šala gabotse (singular)/ Šalang gabotse (plural, also used for elders)(keep well) / Sepela gabotse(singular)/Sepelang gabotse (plural, also used for elders)(go well)
I am looking for a job	Ke nyaka mošomô
No smoking	Ga go kgogwe (/folwe)
No entrance	Ga go tsenwe
Beware of the steps!	Hlokomela disetepese!/ditepisi
Beware!	Hlokomela!
Congratulations on your birthday	Mahlatse letšatšing la gago la matswalo
Seasons greetings	Ditumedišo tša Sehla sa Maikhutšo
Merry Christmas	Mahlogonolo a Keresemose
Merry Christmas and Happy New Year	Mahlogonolo a Keresemose le ngwaga wo moswa wo monate
Expression	Gontsha sa mafahleng
yes	ee/eya/eye
no	aowa
please	hle
thank you	ke a leboga
help	thušang/thušo
danger/accident	kotsi
emergency	tšhoganetšo
excuse me	ntshwarele
I am sorry	Ke maswabi
I love you	Ke a go rata
Questions / sentences	Dipotšišo / mafoko
Do you accept (money/credit cards/traveler's cheques)?	O amogela (singular) / Le amogela ( tshelete/.../...)?
How much is this?	Ke bokae e?
I want ...	Ke nyaka...
What are you doing?	O dira eng?
What is the time?	Ke nako mang?
Where are you going?	O ya kae?
Numbers	Dinomoro
1	tee
2	pedi
3	tharo
4	nne
5	hlano
6	tshela
7	šupa
8	seswai
9	senyane
10	lesome
11	lesometee
12	lesomepedi
13	lesometharo
14	lesomenne
15	lesomehlano
20	masomepedi
21	masomepedi-tee
22	masomepedi-pedi
50	masomehlano
100	lekgolo
1000	sekete
Days of the week	Matšatši a beke
Sunday	Lamorena
Monday	Mošupologo
Tuesday	Labobedi
Wednesday	Laboraro
Thursday	Labone
Friday	Labohlano
Saturday	Mokibelo
Months of the year	Dikgwedi tša ngwaga
January	Pherekgong
February	Dibokwane
March	Hlakola
April	Moranang
May	Mopitlo
June	Ngwatobošego / Phupu
July	Mosegamanye
August	Phato
September	Lewedi
October	Diphalane
November	Dibatsela
December	Manthole
Computers and Internet terms	Didirishwa tsa khomphutha le Inthanete
computer	sebaledi / khomphutara
e-mail	imeile
e-mail address	aterese ya imeile
Internet	Inthanete
Internet café	khefi ya Inthanete
Website	weposaete
Website address	aterese ya weposaete
Rain	Pula
To understand	Go kwešiša
Reed pipes	Dinaka
Drums	Meropa
Horn	Lenaka
Colours	Mebala
Red/orange	Hubedu/Khubedu
Brown	Sotho
Green	Talamorogo
Blue	Talalerata
Black	Ntsho
White	šweu
Yellow	Serolwana
Gold	Gauta
Grey	Pududu
Pale	Sehla or Tshehla
Silver	Silifere

== Sample text ==
Universal Declaration of Human Rights

Temana 1
Batho ka moka ba belegwe ba lokologile le gona ba na le seriti sa go lekana le ditokelo. Ba filwe monagano le letswalo mme ba swanetše go swarana ka moya wa bana ba mpa.

Temana 2
Mang le mang o swanetše ke ditokelo le ditokologo ka moka tše go boletšwego ka tšona ka mo Boikanong bjo, ntle le kgethollo ya mohuta wo mongwe le wo mongwe bjalo ka morafe, mmala, bong, polelo, bodumedi, dipolitiki goba ka kgopolo, botšo go ya ka setšhaba goba maemo, diphahlo, matswalo goba maemo a mangwe le a mangwe.

Go feta fao, ga go kgethollo yeo e swanetšego go dirwa go ya ka maemo a dipolitiki, tokelo ya boahlodi, goba maemo a ditšhabatšhaba goba lefelo leo motho a dulago go lona, goba ke naga ye e ipušago, trasete, naga ya go se ipuše goba se sengwe le se sengwe seo se ka fokotšago maemo a go ikemela ga naga ya gabo.

== See also ==
- Lebowa
- lovedu
