= Ditema tsa Dinoko =

Writing system for siNtu languages

Ditema tsa Dinoko isiBheqe soHlamvu
- Ditema tsa Dinoko written in the syllabary
- Script type: Featural syllabary
- Creator: Xiyinhlanharhu
- Created: c. 2010 – 2015
- Languages: Southern Bantu languages

Related scripts
- Parent systems: Litema, isiNdebele ideographs (Izimpawu zesiNtu): Ditema tsa Dinoko

Ditema or Bheqe syllabics, known in full as Ditema tsa Dinoko in Sotho (pronounced [ditʼɪma t͜sʼa dinʊːkʼʊ]), isiBheqe soHlamvu in Zulu (pronounced [isibʱɛᵏǃʼɛ sɔɬaːɱb̪̊vʱu]), and sometimes Xiyinhlanharhu xa Mipfawulo or Xifungho xa Manungu in Tsonga and Luṱhofunḓeraru lwa Mibvumo or Vhuga ha Madungo in Venḓa, is a featural syllable-based writing system created for use with the siNtu languages. It was developed in the 2010s from the preeminent ideographic traditions of Southern Africa, including litema mural art of Lesotho, the related isiNdebele tradition of ukugwala ("to write", "to draw", "to paint traditional ideographic mural art"), and other symbolic crafts, like the regional beadwork containing ideograms and morphograms, which in isiZulu tradition are called amabheqe. As of 2026, no proposal has been made to encode the script in Unicode.

The script is designed for the phonologies of the siNtu languages at large. It was created as a syllabic system, to suit the highly agglutinative languages of the region. Languages written in the script include ones that have no standardised Latin orthography, such as an Eastern Sotho language like sePulana and the majority of the Tekela languages. A diacritic that indicates vowel nasality, known as ingungwanyana, is provided specifically for the Tekela languages. As with the Latin orthographies, there is no provision for tone, which can generally be inferred from context.

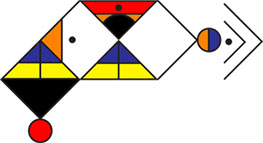
Ditema tsa Dinoko in a stylized script, read left-to-right. The three syllables of first word are clustered, with the third syllable on the bottom

== Description ==
The script has been characterized as a syllabary, as each freestanding letter transcribes a syllable. However, unlike a true syllabary, syllables are not written with distinct letters. Rather, individual graphemes for consonants, vowels and featural elements are combined into syllabic blocks (amabheqe). Except when the syllable being transcribed is a syllabic nasal, the letters are based on a triangular or chevron-shaped grapheme that indicates the vowel of the syllable, with the attached ongwaqa indicating the onset consonants. This is like an abugida, but based on the vowel rather than the onset consonant. Syllabic nasals are written as circles that fill the whole ibheqe or syllable block.

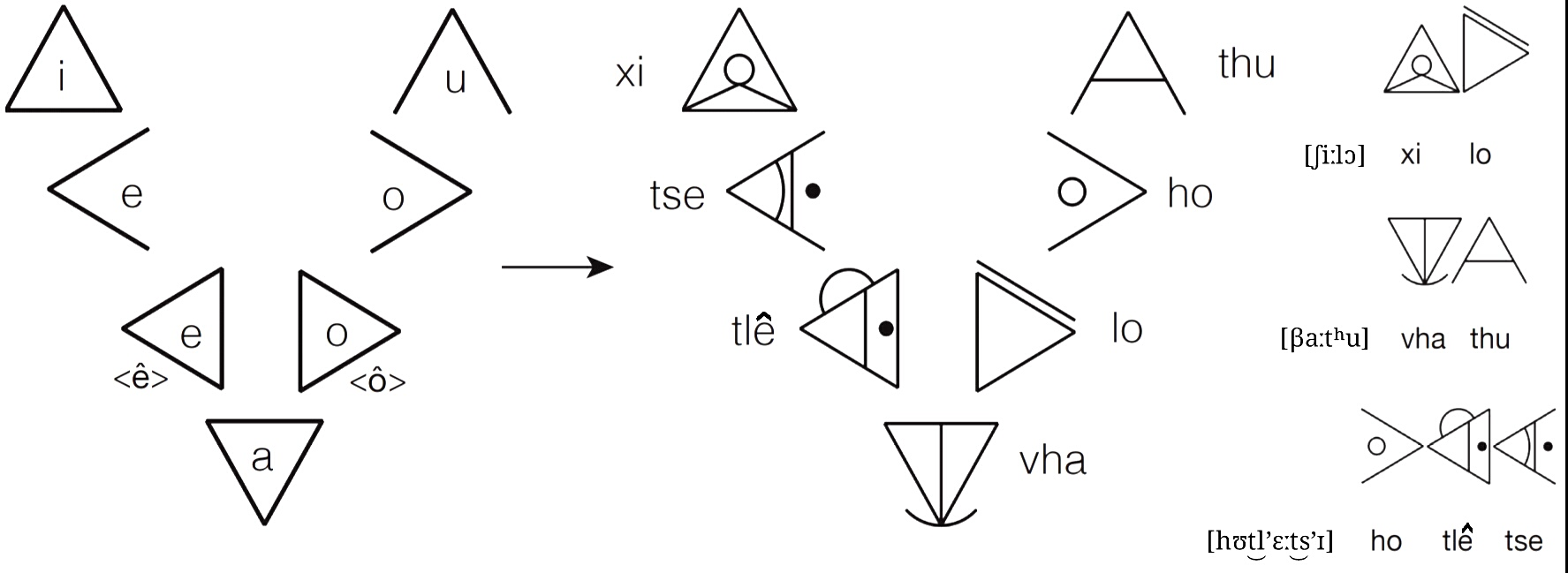
The construction of the syllables of three words in different languages: Xilo [ʃiːlɔ] "thing" in Xitsonga, Vhathu [βaːtʰu] "people" in Tshivenḓa, Ho tlêtse [hʊt͜ɬʼɛːt͜sʼɪ] "It is full" in Sesotho.

== Vowels ==
The vowel graphemes (onkamisa) form the basis of each ibheqe or syllable block, as the nucleus of each syllable, with the ongwaqa or consonant graphemes positioned in and around them.

The direction of each ibheqe indicates the vowel, with up to seven possible:

- Intombi, the upward-facing triangle: /i/
- Isoka, the downward-facing triangle: /a/
- Umkhonto, the upward-facing chevron: /u/
- Iphambili, the leftward-facing triangle: /ɛ/
- Imuva, the rightward-facing triangle: /ɔ/
- Motsutswa, The leftward-facing chevron: /e/ or /ɪ/, depending on the language
- Motsutsena, The rightward-facing chevron: /o/ or /ʊ/

There is an eighth "vowel" represented by the downward-facing chevron, which is the null vowel, uSontandane, transcribed /∅/ in the table below. This is mostly used for foreign words to represent a non-syllabic consonant without a following vowel, often as a syllable coda, which does not occur in siNtu languages.

Vowel length and tone are not distinguishable.

/i/	/e/~/ɪ/	/ɛ/	/a/	/ɔ/	/o/~/ʊ/	/u/	/∅/

The apex of the triangle or chevron corresponds to vowel height or frontedness, with high vowels /i/ and /u/ pointing upwards and the low vowel /a/ pointing downwards. Likewise, the front vowels /ɛ/ and /e/ point leftwards and the back vowels /ɔ/ and /o/ point rightwards.

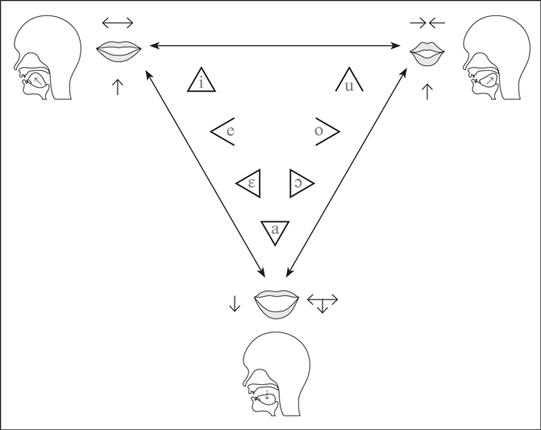
This table showcases how each vowel acquires its shape.

Vowel nasality is indicated with the ingungwanyana, a solid dot placed at the apex of the triangle but separated from it. Here is an example of use, differentiating how the word for below is said and written in Zunda languages (with a circle for a prenasalized consonant) and Tekela languages (with the ingungwanyana):

English	Zunda	Tekela
Down/Below	Phantsi /pʰaː.ntsʼi/	Phãsi /pʰãː.si/
The ingungwanyana diacritic, in its usual and (in grey) alternative position.		

In the case the syllable has a nasal consonant, which occupies the same location, the ingungwanyana can instead be placed on the opposite side of the triangle.

== Consonants ==
The shape of the symbol is made to mimic the shape of the mouth.

Consonants (ongwaqa) are composed of one or more graphemes. At least one of these indicates the place and manner of articulation. If more than one such consonant grapheme is superimposed, this represents a co-articulation, e.g. an affricate (formed of superimposed stop and fricative graphemes), or an onset cluster. Other overlaid dots and strokes indicate articulatory mode, whether that be voiced, prenasalised, implosive, ejective, modal voice, or a combination thereof.

The position of the consonant graphemes largely corresponds to the place of articulation:

- Labials and nasals are positioned outside the triangle, at the apex.
- Alveolars are across the middle of the triangle from side to side.
- Dentals are two lines across the triangle from side to side, parallel to each other.
- Velars and palatals are at the base.
- Laterals are outside the triangle on one side.

The shape of the consonant grapheme corresponds to the manner of articulation:

- Fricatives are indicated by curved lines; with the retroflex/whistled and postalveolar fricatives being loops.
- Plosives are indicated by straight lines in the same position as their fricative counterparts.
- A plosive is written together with a fricative to write an affricate. The post-alveolar and retroflex affricates are ligatures, with the plosive line integrated into the fricative loops.
- Approximants and trills are represented with parallel lines or a line with a right angle in it.
- Nasals, including prenasalization of plosives and affricates, are represented as circles at the apex of the triangle. Lines inside the circles distinguish the nasals from each other, unless a plosive is present, in which case the distinction is not necessary.
- Clicks are a bottomless hourglass-like shapes.
- Onset clusters such as tw are similar to affricates: both consonants are placed in the triangle, though some spacial adjustment may be necessary.
- Syllabic laterals and trills are represented with duplication of the ordinary lateral and trill graphemes.
- Syllabic nasals, amaQanda, are unique in that they are circles rather than triangles that occupy the entire iBheqe space. They follow the same principles as their onset-nasal counterparts.

These graphemes can combine with each other in an order in accordance with the phonotactics of siNtu languages, and they also can combine with the articulatory mode graphemes.

Consonants	Bilabial	Labio-dental	Dental	Alveolar	Post-alveolar	Retroflex	Palatal	Velar	Pharyngeal	Glottal	Lateral (dental or alveolar)
Plosive	/pʰ/		/t̪ʰ/	/tʰ/			/cʰ/	/kʰ/			
Fricative	/ɸ/	/f/		/s/	/ʃ/	/ʂ/-/sᶲ/		/x/	/ħ/ (Note: The symbol for /ħ/ is exclusive for transcription of other languages, as the sound does not occur in Southern Bantu languages.)	/h/	/ɬ/
Affricate (Note: Notice that most of the affricates are formed by writing its component articulations in a single iBheqe, like /p͡fʰ/ being composed of both /pʰ/ and /f/, with the exception of the post-alveolar and retroflex ones, discussed above.)		/p͡fʰ/		/t͡sʰ/	/t͡ʃʰ/	/t͡ʂʰ/-/t͡sᶲ/		/k͡xʰ/			/t͡ɬʰ/
Approximant	/w/						/j/				/l̪/l/
Trill				/r/-/ʀ/ (Note: In Sesotho, French influence may have contributed to the introduction of an allophonic /ʀ/, but in reality its articulation varies from individual to individual. The symbol represents these sounds indistinctively.)							
Tap or Flap						/ɽ/					
Click	/ʘʰ/		/ǀʰ/	/ǃʰ/			/ǂʰ/				/ǁʰ/
Nasal	/m/		/n̪/	/n/			/ɲ/	/ŋ/			
Syllabic Nasal	/m̩/			/n̩/			/ɲ̩/-/ŋ̍/				
Syllabic Approximant/ Trill				/r̩/ (r̩.rV) (Note: Syllabic /r̩/ and /l̩/ are only present when preceding the same phoneme in a CV syllable.)							/l̩/ (l̩.lV)

While normally the voicing line (described in the next section) goes right across the amaBheqe, in the case of the post-alveolar and retroflex sibilants and affricates (that is, /ʃ/, /ʂ/, /sᶲ/, /t͡ʃ/, /t͡ʂ/ and /t͡sᶲ/), the line goes up to the loop, not passing through it, staying on the bottom half for post-alveolars and on the top half for retroflexes. These could be considered ligatures; even so, abbreviation is possible in handwriting, going from the loop part straight to the uphimbo.

	Voiceless Consonant	Voiced Consonant	Handwritten version
Post-alveolar Fricative	/ʃ/	/ʒ/	/ʒ/
Retroflex Fricative	/ʂ/-/sᶲ/	/ʐ/-/z̤ᵝ/	/ʐ/-/z̤ᵝ/
Post-alveolar Affricate	/t͡ʃ/	/d͡ʒ/	/d͡ʒ/
Retroflex Affricate	/t͡ʂ/-/t͡sᶲ/	/d͡ʐ/-/d͡z̤ᵝ/	/d͡ʐ/-/d͡z̤ᵝ/

== Articulatory mode ==
There are three graphemic markers of articulatory mode:

- Uphimbo, the voicing line, is a vertical line that runs from the apex of the triangle to the base (or inline with the ends of the chevron). This symbol modifies the phonation of the consonant.
- Lerothodi, the glottal action dot, is a dot that floats just above the base of the triangle, inside it. When an uphimbo is present, the dot can be moved slightly to a side, and if a consonant shape is in the way, even further, for visibility. This symbol modifies the airstream mechanism of the consonant.
- Ingungwana, the nasalization marker, is a circle that sits at the top of the triangle, touching its apex. This is distinct from the bilabial nasal /m/ (ingungu) that appears on its own, as this one occurs with other consonant graphemes. In this case, no additional lines need to be added to the ingungwana, as the place of articulation is given by them instead.

The table below displays how consonants are modified by these:

Articulation Modifier	Without graphemic marker	With graphemic marker	Rule
Uphimbo	/∅V/	/ɦV/	If the diacritic is the only symbol along the vowel, it represents a Voiced glottal fricative /ɦ/.; When applied to a nasal or a rhotic consonant, its shifts their phonation from modal to breathy voiced.; When applied to any other consonant, it becomes voiced.
Uphimbo	/N/, /R/	/N̤/, /R̤/	If the diacritic is the only symbol along the vowel, it represents a Voiced glottal fricative /ɦ/.; When applied to a nasal or a rhotic consonant, its shifts their phonation from modal to breathy voiced.; When applied to any other consonant, it becomes voiced.
Uphimbo	/p/, /t/, /k/	/b/, /d/, /g/	If the diacritic is the only symbol along the vowel, it represents a Voiced glottal fricative /ɦ/.; When applied to a nasal or a rhotic consonant, its shifts their phonation from modal to breathy voiced.; When applied to any other consonant, it becomes voiced.
Lerothodi. In grey, alternative placements to avoid consonants.	/∅V/	/ʔV/	If the diacritic is the only mark on the iBheqe, it can denote a glottal stop, though more often than not that sound is non phonemic.; For unvoiced and aspirated consonants, the diacritic indicates a glottalized ejection. If the language doesn't have ejectives, then it turns into its plain modal form.; For breathy voiced consonants, it indicates an implosive release. If the language doesn't have implosives, then it turns into its plain modal form.
Lerothodi. In grey, alternative placements to avoid consonants.	/pʰ/, /tʰ/, /ᵏǃʰ/	/pʼ/, /tʼ/, /ᵏǃʼ/	If the diacritic is the only mark on the iBheqe, it can denote a glottal stop, though more often than not that sound is non phonemic.; For unvoiced and aspirated consonants, the diacritic indicates a glottalized ejection. If the language doesn't have ejectives, then it turns into its plain modal form.; For breathy voiced consonants, it indicates an implosive release. If the language doesn't have implosives, then it turns into its plain modal form.
Lerothodi. In grey, alternative placements to avoid consonants.	/pʰ/, /tʰ/, /ᵏǃʰ/	/p/, /t/, /ᵏǃ/	If the diacritic is the only mark on the iBheqe, it can denote a glottal stop, though more often than not that sound is non phonemic.; For unvoiced and aspirated consonants, the diacritic indicates a glottalized ejection. If the language doesn't have ejectives, then it turns into its plain modal form.; For breathy voiced consonants, it indicates an implosive release. If the language doesn't have implosives, then it turns into its plain modal form.
Lerothodi. In grey, alternative placements to avoid consonants.	/b̤/, /d̤ /, /g̤/	/ɓ/, /ɗ/, /ɠ/	If the diacritic is the only mark on the iBheqe, it can denote a glottal stop, though more often than not that sound is non phonemic.; For unvoiced and aspirated consonants, the diacritic indicates a glottalized ejection. If the language doesn't have ejectives, then it turns into its plain modal form.; For breathy voiced consonants, it indicates an implosive release. If the language doesn't have implosives, then it turns into its plain modal form.
Lerothodi. In grey, alternative placements to avoid consonants.	/b̤/, /d̤ /, /g̤/	/b/, /d/, /g/	If the diacritic is the only mark on the iBheqe, it can denote a glottal stop, though more often than not that sound is non phonemic.; For unvoiced and aspirated consonants, the diacritic indicates a glottalized ejection. If the language doesn't have ejectives, then it turns into its plain modal form.; For breathy voiced consonants, it indicates an implosive release. If the language doesn't have implosives, then it turns into its plain modal form.
Ingungwana	/b/, /k/	/mb/, /ŋk/	This diacritic marks prenasalized consonants.; When its used on an ejective click consonant (marked with the lerothodi), the ingungu denotes prenasalization. If it's a plain click, then it becomes nasal.
Ingungwana	/ᵏǃʼ/, /ᵏǁʼ/	/ŋᵏǃʼ/, /ŋᵏǁʼ/	This diacritic marks prenasalized consonants.; When its used on an ejective click consonant (marked with the lerothodi), the ingungu denotes prenasalization. If it's a plain click, then it becomes nasal.
Ingungwana	/ᵏǃʰ/, /ᶢǀʱ/	/ᵑǃʰ/, /ᵑǀʱ/	This diacritic marks prenasalized consonants.; When its used on an ejective click consonant (marked with the lerothodi), the ingungu denotes prenasalization. If it's a plain click, then it becomes nasal.
