= Morphin =

Morphin may refer to the following:

- Morphing, a graphics effect where one image seamlessly transitions into another
- Morphine, a potent opiate analgesic and psychoactive drug
- Morphin, the name of transformation sequence in the Power Rangers franchise
  - Mighty Morphin Power Rangers

== See also ==
- Morph (disambiguation)
