= Morph =

Morph may refer to:

== Biology ==
- Morph (zoology), a visual or behavioral difference between organisms of distinct populations in a species
- Muller's morphs, a classification scheme for genetic mutations
- "-morph", a suffix commonly used in taxonomy

== Computing ==
- Morphing, in motion pictures and animations, a special effect that changes one image into another through a seamless transition
  - Gryphon Software Morph, morphing software
- Morph target animation, a method of animating computer generated imagery

== Fiction ==
- Morph, a British claymation character, who has featured in:
  - Morph (TV series), animated television series
  - The Amazing Adventures of Morph, a British stop-motion clay animation television show
- Morph, the name of two characters in Marvel Comics
  - Changeling (Marvel Comics character), a character also known as Morph
    - Morph (X-Men: The Animated Series), the iteration of the character from X-Men: The Animated Series
  - Morph (Benjamin Deeds), a character in Generation X
- In Animorphs, "morphing" is alien technology that allows one to transform into any animal or person that one touches
- In the Power Rangers franchise, a character transforms by "morphing" from a device.

== Music ==
- Morph, a 2014 album by Hins Cheung
- Morph, a 2018 album by Yentl en De Boer
- "Morph" (song), a 2018 song by Twenty One Pilots

== Other uses ==
- Morph (video game), a 1993 SNES, Amiga and Amiga CD32 puzzle game
- Morphs collaboration, a collaboration that studied the evolution of spiral galaxies using the Magellan and the Hubble Space Telescope

== See also ==
- Morpheme, the smallest component of a word, or other linguistic unit, that has semantic meaning
- Morpher (disambiguation)
- Morphic (disambiguation)
- Morphism, between two mathematical structures
- Morphogram, the representation of a morpheme by a grapheme based solely on its meaning
- Morphology (disambiguation)
- Polymorphism (disambiguation)
