= Morphic =

Morphic may refer to:

- Morphic field and morphic resonance, parapsychological theories by Rupert Sheldrake
- Morphic word, a mathematical and computer scientific concept
- Morphic (software), a graphical user interface builder
- Morphism, a mathematical concept

== See also ==
- Morph (disambiguation)
