= Litema =

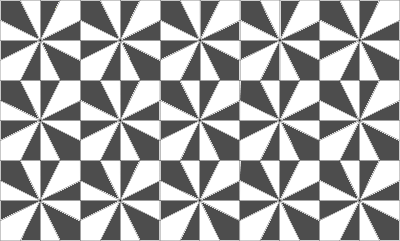
Traditional Tema pattern with inversion and rotation of the model base

Litema, spelled Ditema in South African Sesotho orthography (Sotho: [ditʼɪːma]; Singular: Tema, Sesotho for "text" or "ploughed land") is a form of Sotho mural art composed of decorative and symbolic geometric patterns, commonly associated with Sotho tradition today practiced in Lesotho and neighbouring areas of South Africa. Basotho women generate litema on the outer walls and inside of homesteads by means of engraving, painting, relief mouldings and/or mosaic. Typically the geometric patterns are combed or scratched into the wet top layer of fresh clay and dung plaster of the wall, and later painted with earth ochers or, in contemporary times, manufactured paint. Patterns most often mimic ploughed fields through a combed texture, or the patterns refer to plant life, and more occasionally to other aspects of the natural world, such as referring to clan totem animals. Litema are transient; they may desiccate and crumble or be washed away by heavy rain. It is common for women of an entire village to apply litema on such special occasions as a wedding or a religious ceremony.

== Etymology ==
As Gary van Wyk (1993:84) pointed out in his analysis of the etymology of the Sesotho noun denoting "Sesotho mural art," litema also refers to the associated concepts of "ploughed lands", and the decorative tradition is symbolically linked to cultivation in many ways. It is derived from the verb stem -lema (in the infinitive, ho lema "to cultivate"), which is a reflex of the Proto-Bantu root *-dɪ̀m- "to cultivate (esp. with hoe)". The orthographic ⟨l⟩ in li- (Class 10 noun class prefix for Sesotho nouns) is pronounced [d] in Sesotho since [d] is an allophone of /l/ occurring before the close vowels, /i/ and /u/. The orthographic ⟨e⟩ can have three possible values in Sesotho: /ɪ/, /ɛ/, and /e/. In ⟨litema⟩ is pronounced /ɪ/, as per the Proto-Bantu root.

== Design ==
The litema patterns are characterised by a multi-stage symmetry. Patterns are generally arranged in square cells. A wall to be shaped is divided into a grid to form the cells. Each cell is applied with the same pattern, which is usually rotated or mirrored from cell to cell. The symmetry of the overall pattern thus depends on the symmetries present in the basic pattern. There are designs with only one mirror axis in the basic patterns that result in an overall impression of flowing in one direction. Other basic patterns have several axes of symmetry or a rotational symmetry, and give the overall pattern a rather flat ornamental impression. The colour design is restrained, usually only two colours are used

== History ==
The tradition of mural art in Southern Africa is not of recent origins. While excavations at Sotho-Tswana archaeological sites have revealed hut floors that have survived the elements for as much as 1500 years, the earliest evidence of Sotho-Tswana mural painting stretches back about five centuries (Grant 1995:45; Van Wyk 1998:88). It long predates the tradition of Ndebele mural painting that has been globally popularized. Begun in the 19th century, the Ndzundza Ndebele mural art tradition called igwalo (more widely known as Ndebele house painting), is said to be a synthesis of a Northern Sotho ditema tradition and the Nguni design traditions employed in beadwork, pottery and basket weaving.

=== Colonial record ===
One of the earliest written accounts of Basotho mural art is by the missionary Rev. John Campbell. In his 1813 description of Batlhaping (South Tswana) art, Campbell stated the following:"Having heard of some paintings in Salakootoo's house, we went after breakfast to view them. We found them very rough representations of the camel-leopard, rhinoceros, elephant, lion, tiger, and stein-buck, which Salakootoo's wife had drawn on the clay wall, with white and black paint. However, they were as well done as we expected, and may lead to something better" (Grant 1995:43).

On his second journey in 1820, Campbell, gave an enthusiastic account of what he saw at the house of a certain chief "Sinosee" of the Hurutse lineage of the Sotho-Tswana. Campbell provided both illustrations as well as a verbal description of the chief's house: "The wall was painted yellow, and ornamented with figures of shields, elephants and camel-leopards, etc. It was also adorned with a neat cornice or border painting of a red colour...its walls (of Sinosee's bedroom) were decorated with delightful representations of elephants and giraffes… In some houses there were figures, pillars, etc moulded in hard clay and painted with different colours that would not have disgraced European workmen" (Van Wyk 1996:43; 1998:88). Campbell's accounts were compiled and published by historian George Stow, in his book The Native Races of South Africa (1905). Stow also published the earliest known drawings of litema – reproductions of eight designs made by the "Bakuena" (the founding clan of the Basotho nation), which he likely drew himself, based on an unpublished letter by Stow in the South African Library in which he recounts visiting a ruined Bakoena kraal (Van Wyk 1998:89). Stow's drawings showed textured panels similar to litema engravings still made today as well as painted patterns of dots, stripes, triangles, and zigzags executed in limited colors. In his 1861 book, the French missionary Eugene Casallis recalled the litema patterns he had experienced since settling among Basotho in the 1830s, calling the designs "ingenious", which suggests designs more intricate than the Bakoena examples Stow reproduced (Van Wyk 1998:89). Stow's documentation did not include any designs incorporating plant motifs like those seen in modern-day litema. Van Wyk (1994) suggests that the more modern and "intricate curvilinear designs have a distinctly Victorian or Edwardian flavor that was probably influenced by such turn-of-the-century European products as linoleum patterns, cast-iron moldings and lace".

=== Contemporary revival ===
Almost a century separates Stow's drawings from those done in 1976 by students of the Lesotho National Teachers Training College (Van Wyk 1989:89). Benedict Lira Mothibe, an art lecturer at the college at the time, instructed students to copy litema designs for the purposes of using these in classroom geometry lessons and as copies for potato prints. More importantly, it was an attempt by Mothibe to revive interest in what he considered a worthwhile Sesotho tradition. Gary van Wyk employed these drawings during his extensive field research in South Africa and Lesotho from 1991-1994, recording women's responses to the historical patterns, including the names and meanings they ascribed to them, and later republished several of the drawings. He found that although many of the specific vegetal patterns (e.g. "melons") that had been named in the 1970s had been forgotten by the 1990s and subsumed under a general descriptive category of "blomme", the Afrikaans word for "flowers," nonetheless this designation maintained the close symbolic association between women and vegetative fertility, linked to women's traditional roles as cultivators and foragers. Furthermore, a few patterns recorded by Mothibe were still identifiable and being produced in the early 1990s, such as one that refers to the board for marabaraba, a popular indigenous game like checkers (1998:90-91).

More recently (2003), Mothibe, in a further contribution towards the cause of preservation, compiled and donated a second edition on litema designs entitled Basotho Litema Patterns (With Modifications) to the School of Design Technology and Visual Art of the Central University of Technology, Free State, providing an updated record of designs and their interpretation.

== Symbolism ==
Research conducted by Van Wyk and Mathews in the late-1980s and mid-1990s, culminating in two photographically illustrated books titled African Painted Houses: Basotho Dwellings of Southern Africa (Van Wyk, 1998) and The African Mural (Chanquion & Matthews, 1989), suggests that the art of litema cannot be understood in purely aesthetic terms.

=== Woman, Nature and Litema ===
In several works on this topic, Gary Van Wyk (1993, 1994, 1996, 1998) states that Sesotho murals are a form of religious art, appeals to the ancestors for the rain that delivers the fertility that nourishes the fields and thereby sustains the herds and the human community. Murals, he says, can be seen as prayers in paint. If the ancestors are satisfied, they provide rain that washes away the murals, and the cycle of life begins anew. It is fitting that murals are produced by women, who are symbolically linked to the house, which is a metaphor of the womb and of creation, and to the vegetal realm to which women are linked through their traditional roles as cultivators and foragers, and through several other vegetal symbols. The Basotho creation myth, for example, states that the nation emerged from a dark place deep in the earth through a bed of reeds; accordingly it was once customary upon the birth of child inside the earthen house, originally built in an igloo shape, and therefore womb-like, to place a reed in the doorway of the home until the child "crossed the reed" to emerge into the light of day (Van Wyk 1998: 103-107). Similarly, female initiates wear a reed mask, and during their initiation confinement they weave reed mats.

This symbolic link between the igloo-shaped house and the body later was transferred to modern rectangular homes with flat roofs, where the surrounds of doorways and windows were particularly ornamented, and the name for the litema patterns along the roofline was the "headband". "The fecundity of fields and of women is celebrated in the creation of radiant blooms, unfurling fronds, spiralling tendrils and sprouts...Because agricultural labor was traditionally women's work, women who decorate houses can be viewed as picturing this work in the fields upon their walls. The murals are thus African landscapes, composed of the very landscape they represent" (Van Wyk 1994). This is most apparent in litema patterns that consist solely of uncolored combing into mud: these closely mimic the appearance of a plowed field. Van Wyk found that red ocher, called letsoku, or "the blood of the earth", symbolized fertility and the blood of both menstruation and sacrifice, underscoring the key link between the ancestors and fertility and accounting for the fact that red ocher is invariably incorporated into every painting scheme. White symbolized the calm, purity and enlightenment that the ancestors promote and desire, while black represented the dark rain clouds that the ancestors deliver if all is calm and well, and these two colors are frequently combined in dense, alternating patterns applied to transitional zones of the architecture, such as the roofline and around doors and windows. Similarly, such patterns elements as triangles and zigzags likely also carried symbolic meanings that have become obscured in recent times. During the 1980s and early 1990s, Van Wyk also photographed murals that expressed political statements, using the colors of the banned African National Congress during the apartheid era, or incorporating specific political graphics or statements.

Tom Mathews in his writings (supported by photographs taken by his son Paul Chanquion) stated that flowers and dots were symbols of fertility. Furthermore, he states that chevron patterns represent water or uneven ground whilst triangles are symbols denoting male and female (Changuion & Matthews, 1989:9,19,55).

In the study conducted by the CUT, no persons knowledgeable in the art of litema (Bekker, Thabane and Mothibe) or practising litema artists had any knowledge of a deeper significance other than that of beautifying the home for aesthetic purposes. Some of the artists questioned did however share their opinions concerning the possibility of symbolic meaning. According to artists in the Free State, their mothers (many of whom originate from Lesotho), might have been aware of such meanings, but did not share this information with them during their teaching.

== Literature ==
- Gary van Wyk: Through the Cosmic Flower: Secret resistance in the mural art of Sotho-Tswana women. In: Mary H. Nooter: Secrecy: African art that conceals and reveals. Museum for African Art, New York 1993, ISBN 3791312308.
- Gary van Wyk: Patterns of Possession : An Art of African Habitation. UMI Dissertation Services, Ann Arbor, MI, 1996.
- Gary van Wyk: African painted houses : Basotho dwellings of Southern Africa. Abrams, New York 1998, ISBN 0-8109-1990-7.
- Paul Changuion: The African mural. New Holland Publishers, London 1989, ISBN 1-85368-062-1.
- Paulus Gerdes: On Mathematical Ideas in Cultural Traditions of Central and Southern Africa. In: Helaine Selin (Hrsg.): Mathematics across cultures: the history of non-western mathematics. Springer, New York 2001, ISBN 1402002602, S. 313–344.
- Paulus Gerdes: Women, Art And Geometry In Southern Africa. Africa World Press, Trenton (NJ) 1998, ISBN 0-86543-601-0.
- Sandy and Elinah Grant: Decorated homes in Botswana, Creda Press, Cape Town 1996, ISBN 9991201408.
- Benedict Mothibe: Litema: Designs by Students at the NTTCL, Morija Press, Maseru 1976.
