= Morpher =

Morpher may refer to:

- A fictional device used to transform into a color-suited Power Ranger
- A character class in Final Fantasy Tactics Advance

== See also ==
- Morph (disambiguation)
