= Sotho nouns =

Grammatical category in the Bantu language of the Sotho

Sesotho nouns signify concrete or abstract concepts in the language, but are distinct from the Sesotho pronouns.

Bantu languages are often said to have sentences which are "centred around the noun" due to the striking nature of the noun concordance system. In Sesotho, pronouns, verbs, copulatives, adjectives, relatives, enumeratives, and possessives all need to agree with the noun(s) associated with them.

== Structure ==
Except for class 1a (which has a "null prefix"), nouns are composed of a noun prefix and a stem (which may in turn be derived from other parts of speech; see below under Derivation). Each noun belongs to one of several noun classes and the knowledge of noun classes and their concords is pivotal to composing coherent sentences.

Usually, the noun's class can be discerned by simply looking for the prefix, but there are many instances where this can become very complicated:

- The syllabic nasal prefix of class 9 is more often than not invisible
- Classes 1, 3, and 18 have similar prefixes but differing concords
- Classes 2a and 14 have similar looking prefixes, differing in the vowel's quality and tone
- Classes 15 and 17 have similar looking prefixes, differing only in tone
- Many class 1 and 3 nouns have stems beginning with vowels, often causing the /m/ to velarize to /ŋ/
  [mʊ] mo + [ɑnɑ] -ana → [ŋʷɑnɑ] ngwana ('child' cf. Swahili mwana; Proto-Bantu *-jana)
- Similarly, many class 14 nouns with stems beginning with vowels cause the prefix to palatalize to [ʒ]
  [bʊ] bo + [ɑŋ̩] -ang → [ʒʷɑŋ̩] jwang ('grass' cf. Proto-Bantu *-janî)
- Often if the stem of a class 1 or 3 noun is derived from a verb beginning with /b/, the /b/ is absorbed by the /m/ (the vowel is elided) to become [m̩m]
  [busɑ] -busa ('govern') → [m̩musɔ] mmuso ('government')

There are further complications caused by stems that begin with vowels when the vowels interact causing the quality and tone of the prefix vowel to change (this never happens if the stem comes from a vowel verb); in these cases it is often simply a matter of memorising the correct class and plural for each individual word.

Noun stems can range in length from monosyllabic as in [mʊtʰʊ] motho ('person'), to very long stems formed either by duplication (e.g. [xodumodumo] kgodumodumo ('great and fearsome thing', the swallowing monster) or derived from long and complex verbs, such as the seven-syllable [pʰupʼɑʀʊl̩lɛlɑnɔ] phuparollelano ('the act of mutual giving and receiving'), derived from a verb which is in turn idiomatically and recursively and comes through four distinct steps — derived from the verb [fupʼɑ] fupara ('to close one's hand suddenly').

== Noun prefix system ==
Sesotho, like all other Bantu languages, uses a set of "noun classes" and each noun belongs to one of the classes. The noun class that a noun belongs to is indicated by a prefix.

Nouns are divided somewhat arbitrarily between these classes, although a few of them contain nouns which mostly fall into clear categories. For example, all class 1 nouns are humans and verbal agents, most class 1a nouns are proper names and kinship terms, etc.

The noun classes and their respective prefixes are as follows:

The Sesotho noun prefix system
Class	Prefix	Spelling	Example(s)	Notes
1.	[mʊ]	mo-	[mʊtʰʊ] motho ('person')	human nouns
2.	[bɑ]	ba-	[bɑtʰʊ] batho ('people')	human nouns
1a.	—		[n̩tʼɑtʼe] ntate ('father')	mostly human nouns including nouns of kinship. The bo- is high tone
2a.	[bo]	bo-	[bon̩tʼɑtʼe] bontate ('fathers')	mostly human nouns including nouns of kinship. The bo- is high tone
3.	[mʊ]	mo-	[mʊnʷɑnɑ] monwana ('finger')	mostly non-human nouns
4.	[mɪ]	me-	[mɪnʷɑnɑ] menwana ('fingers')	mostly non-human nouns
5.	[lɪ]	le-	[lɪt͡sʼɑt͡sʼi] letsatsi ('day')	both human and non-human
6.	[mɑ]	ma-	[mɑt͡sʼɑt͡sʼi] matsatsi ('days')	both human and non-human
7.	[sɪ]	se-	[siˌpʰiʀi] sephiri ('secret')	human and non-human
8.	[di]	di-	[dipʰiʀi] diphiri ('secrets')	human and non-human
9.	[N]-	(variable)	[n̩tʰɔ] ntho ('thing')	miscellaneous
9.	[N]-	(variable)	[tʰɑpʼɛlɔ] thapelo ('prayer')	miscellaneous
10.	[di]	di[N]-	[din̩tʰɔ] dintho ('things')	miscellaneous
10.	[di]	di[N]-	[ditʰɑpʼɛlɔ] dithapelo ('prayers')	miscellaneous
14.	[bʊ]	bo-	[bʊhɔbɛ] bohobe ('bread')	abstract nouns belong here, therefore most class 14 words have no plural
14.	[bʊ]	bo-	[bʊbɪ] bobe ('ugliness')	abstract nouns belong here, therefore most class 14 words have no plural
15.	[hʊ]	ho-	[hʊt͡sʼɑmɑjɑ] ho tsamaya ('to go')	infinitives and gerunds belong here
16.	[fɑ]	fa-	[fɑt͡sʰɪ] fatshe ('down')	this is the only word in this class
17.	[hʊ]	ho-	[hʊlɛ] hole ('far away')	
17.	[hʊ]	ho-	[hʊsɑnɪ] hosane ('tomorrow')	
18.	[mʊ]	mo-	[moʀɑhʊ] moraho ('behind')	
18.	[mʊ]	mo-	[mʊse] mose ('overseas')	

Notes:

1. [N] means that nasalization will occur to the following consonant.
2. Many class 5 words in Sesotho come from the original Proto-Bantu *du- class 11, whose plural is class 10 *dîN-, which is why some class 5 nouns may have two distinct plurals: one in class 6, and one in class 10. However, the di[N]- plural does not apply to all class 5 words, and when it does the meaning might be changed slightly (e.g. [mɑlɪmɪ] maleme 'tongues', [ditʼɪmɪ] diteme 'flattery'). For example, Setswana uses lorato for Sesotho [lɪʀɑtʼɔ] lerato ('love'), as this class still exists in the language.
3. Classes 16, 17, and 18 are the locative classes. They are no longer productive in Sesotho (they cannot accept new nouns) but they are productive in many other Bantu languages.
4. Noun Classes 11 to 13, and 19 to 23 do not occur in Sesotho, but do occur in other Bantu languages (isiZulu has class 11, Silozi has Classes 11, 12, and 13, etc.).

Each basic noun in Sesotho has an inherent prefix (even if that prefix is a null prefix: segmentally empty). The speaker's mental lexicon includes the entire word, including the class prefix, which is usually enough to determine the class and therefore the concords as well.

[sɪfɑtʼɛ] sefate ('tree') has prefix [sɪ] se-, which is of class 7, therefore its plural must be [difɑtʼɛ] difate

Up until class 10, the plural class for class n is class n + 1 (where n is odd). Most languages have these first ten classes, though there are many where some of the classes 1 to 10 are missing.

Though class membership is ultimately determined by morphology (the class prefix and the noun's concords) and not semantics, it is obvious from comparing the class contents of various languages that there are some tentative semantic trends. The strongest trend (which is basically a rule) is that all class 1 nouns are human, and non-human nouns that begin with the mo- prefix are therefore in class 3 (in fact, there are no human class 3 nouns in Sesotho). In many other languages, however, class 1 contains "animate" nouns, and may therefore also contain some non-human nouns.

[mʊt͡sʼʷɑl̩lɛ] Motswalle ('friend'), in class 1, has an irregular plural in class 4 — [mɪt͡sʼʷɑl̩lɛ] metswalle. Also, [mʊʀɛnɑ] morena ('king'), has a plural in class 6. Many class 1 words have a tendency of misbehaving, but we know that they belong to class 1 because of their concords. Quite a substantial number of class 1 words have their plurals in class 6.

All these irregularities with the plurals naturally lead to a system where each class is treated as a separate gender, instead of alternatives where the first twelve classes are grouped into six genders.

Often, when the prefix of a noun whose stem begins with a vowel (and is not derived from a vowel verb stem) is obscured by various phonological processes, prefix compounding may occur (instead of the usual prefix substitution) when forming plurals, or even in the singular itself. Some words may even end up in a different class

[ʒʷɑŋ̩] jwang ('grass') in class 14 is often heard as [bʊʒʷɑŋ̩] bojwang and has plural [mɑʒʷɑŋ̩] majwang, both instances of prefix compounding since the jwa- is the palatalized class 14 prefix bo-.
[ŋʷet͡sʼi] ngwetsi ('daughter-in-law') was originally a class 1 word, whose prefix is velarized and is now treated as a class 9 noun with plural [diŋʷet͡sʼi] dingwetsi. In Setswana, however, it is still treated as a class 1 noun with plural betsi

In idiomatic speech, the le- of class 5, the se- of class 7, and the di- of classes 8 and 10 are sometimes not rendered when the noun is followed by the appropriate concords. Some historical words, such as [liˌt͡sʼi'e] letsie ('locust'), have completely lost their singular prefixes (and, in the case of [t͡sʼi'e] tsie, ended up in class 9). Others, such as [lɪlɑpʼɑ] lelapa ('family') are often rendered without the prefix even when not followed by any prefixes ("at my/the home" is always [lɑpʼeŋ̩] lapeng). The class 5 noun [isɑ'ʊ] isao ('next year') has completely lost its prefix, and has plural [mɑ'isɑ'ʊ] maisao.

=== Class contents ===
What follows is a brief outline of the contents and functionings of the various classes.

Class 1 (the "animate/human" class) contains most human nouns and is the default class for verbal agents (actors), which end in the vowel ⟨i⟩.

The class prefix is mo- and comes from original Proto-Bantu *mu-. In standard Sesotho, the prefix appears as mm- before stems beginning with b.

[mʊɬɑn̩kʼɑ] mohlanka ('servant')
[mʊʀɛnɑ] morena ('king')
[mʊt͡sʼʷɑl̩lɛ] motswalle ('friend')
[lekʼʊlɑ] -lekola ('investigate') → [mʊlekʼuˌdi] molekodi ('investigator')
[bu'ɛlɑ] -buella ('speak on behalf of') → [m̩mu'el̩li] mmuelli ('advocate')

Class 1a (the "kin" class) has exactly the same concords as class 1, but differs from it in the lack of prefix. It contains proper names of people, kinship terms, as well as the names of some animals and plants.

The proper names and kinship terms generally have miscellaneous forms, but the names of animals, plants (possibly personifications), and some humans in this class begin with a mma- or ma- prefix.

Names of mothers, fathers, married women and men (in a system of [hʊɬɔnɪpʰɑ] ho hlonepha prohibiting the use of nouns sounding like the names of certain family members), and initiated boys and girls may be formed from other nouns and proper names with the prefixes mma- (or just ma-) and ra- meaning "mother of" and "father of" respectively (though initiates often get prefixes of the opposite sex, ma- for boys and ra- for girls).

[mɑlʊmɛ] malome ('elder uncle' literally "male mother" — the only Sesotho instance of the Bantu male suffix *-dume)
[ʀɑtʼɑ] -rata ('desire') → [tʰɑtʼɔ] thato will (of God) (class 9) → [tʰɑtʼɔ] Thato (proper name)
[tʰɑtʼɔ] Thato (proper name) → [m̩mɑtʰɑtʼɔ] Mmathato Thato's mother, and [ʀɑtʰɑtʼɔ] Rathato ('Thato's father')
[m̩mɑmʊlɑŋʷɑnɪ] mmamolangwane (' secretary bird ')

Class 2 is the plural class for class 1. There are, however, many class 1 nouns which have their plural in class 6 instead.

The class prefix is ba- and comes from original Proto-Bantu *ba-.

[bɑɬɑn̩kʼɑ] bahlanka ('servants')

Class 2a is the plural class for class 1a. When used with human nouns it sometimes has the meaning of "X and them" or "the people/followers/kin of X." It uses exactly the same concords as class 2.

The class prefix is a high tone bo- and comes from original Proto-Bantu *bo-.

[bom̩mɑtʰɑtʼɔ] Bo-Mmathato ('Mmathato and them')
[bom̩mɑmʊlɑŋʷɑnɪ] bommamolangwane ('secretary birds')

In informal speech, the "X and them" meaning is often extended, with the prefix being compounded upon nouns in other classes to create words meaning "X and such."

[dibɑtʼɑkʼiˌdipʰɔ'ɔfɔlɔt͡sʼet͡sʼʷɑnɑŋ̩lɪboditʼɑ'ulebomɑŋɑ'uʒʷɑloʒʷɑlo] dibata ke diphoofolo tse tshwanang le bo-ditau le bo-mangau, jwalo-jwalo ('predators are animals such as lions and cheetahs and such, et cetera')

Class 3 (the "tree" class) has miscellaneous content. Some nouns in this class also come from verbs, but are non-personal and usually end in the vowel ⟨o⟩.

The class prefix is exactly the same as that of class 1, but the two classes use different concords. Like class 1 the prefix appears as mm- before stems beginning with ⟨b⟩ in standard Sesotho.

[muˌʀu] moru ('forest')
[dumɑ] -duma ('resound') → [muˌdumɔ] modumo ('noise')
[m̩mɑlɑ] mmala ('colour') stem [bɑlɑ] -bala)

Class 4 contains the plurals of class 3 nouns.

The class prefix is me- and comes from original Proto-Bantu *mi-.

[mɪbɑlɑ] mebala ('colours')

Class 5 (the "natural phenomena" class) is very homogeneous in content. It has many terms of body parts which appear in pairs, natural phenomena, and certain special classes of people.

The class prefix is le- and comes from original Proto-Bantu *di- as well as Proto-Bantu *du- (class 11, the "long-thin" class).

[liˌfubɑ] lefuba ('tuberculosis')
[xɛtʰɑ] -kgetha ('choose') → [lɪxɛtʰɑ] lekgetho ('election')
[lɪ'ʊtʼʊ] leoto ('leg')
[lɪɬɑkʼɑ] lehlaka ('reed') originally from class 11

Class 6 (the "liquid masses" class) contains the plurals of class 5 nouns as well as the plurals of many class 1 nouns, class 9 nouns ("quantitive plurals"), and all class 14 nouns which may assume plurals. It also contains the names of some liquids which only appear in the plural.

The class prefix is ma- and comes from original Proto-Bantu *ma-.

[mɑ'ʊtʼʊ] maoto ('legs')
[mɑdi] madi ('blood')
[mɑxomʊ] makgomo ('herds of cattle') quantitative plural of class 9 [xomʊ] kgomo
[mɑʀɛnɑ] marena ('kings') plural of class 1 [mʊʀɛnɑ] morena
[mɑhɑdi] mahadi ('lobolo') plural of class 14 [bʊhɑdi] bohadi

Class 7 (the "special quality" class) is fairly homogeneous in content and also contains the names of the languages or cultures of various societies. This class also contains many abstract nouns derived from nouns in other classes.

The class prefix is se- and comes from original Proto-Bantu *ki-.

[sɪfofu] sefofu ('blind person')
[sɪfɑtʼɛ] sefate ('tree')
[sɪfʊʀɑ] Sefora ('French')
[sɪt͡sʼʷɑl̩lɛ] setswalle ('friendship') abstract noun from class 1 [mʊt͡sʼʷɑl̩lɛ] motswalle

Class 8 contains the plurals of class 7 nouns. Note that language and culture names, as well as abstract nouns, do not have plurals.

The class prefix is di- (without nasalization) and comes from original Proto-Bantu *bî-.

[difɑtʼɛ] difate ('trees')

Class 9 (the "inanimate/animal" class) is rather miscellaneous in content. Most foreign acquisitions end up here (it is the "default class").

The class prefix is [N]- and comes from either original Proto-Bantu *N- or *ni-. Note that for almost all nouns with stems of two or more syllables the syllabic nasal does not appear but the stem is still nasalized.

[n̩t͡sʰi] ntshi ('eyelash')
[binɑ] -bina ('sing → [pʼinɑ] pina ('song')

[xomʊ] kgomo ('cow')
[n̩nɪtʼɪ] nnete ('truth') the nasal is retained though the stem is two syllables long
[m̩pʼɑ] mpa ('stomach') the high tone syllabic /m/ suggests that it's not part of the prefix, but rather part of the stem

This class also contains a curious set of nouns formed by the action of a class 1, 3, or 18 prefix losing its vowel and thus becoming a syllabic nasal. However, since this process often happens when constructing first names of people, the resulting noun then appears in class 1a.

[si'uwɑ] -siuwa ('be left behind') → [muˌsi'uwɑ] mosiuwa (class 1) ('the one left behind') → [n̩t͡sʰi'uwɑ] ntshiuwa (class 9) → [n̩t͡sʰi'uwɑ] ntshiuwa (class 1a) ('the one left behind [due to being born shortly after a relative's death]')
[huˌsuɲɑhɑʀɪ] ho sunya hare ('to forcefully insert') → [n̩t͡sʰuɲɑxɑʀɪ] ntshunyakgare (compound class 9 noun) ('intruder')
[mʊʀɑ'ʊ] morao (class 18) ('behind') → [n̩tʰɑ'ʊ] nthao (quaint or technical way of saying 'behind')

When deriving non-personal nouns from monosyllabic verb stems, two strategies may be used. The first form creates objects, and simply nasalizes the verb stem, replaces the final vowel with ⟨o⟩, and affixes the syllabic nasal. The second strategy is much less common and creates nouns indicating actions by first replacing the final vowel with [ɪ'ɔ] -eo before applying the nasalization.

[fɑ] -fa ('give') → [m̩pʰɔ] mpho ('gift')
[ʒɑ] -ja ('eat') → [t͡ʃʼɪ'ɔ] tjeo ('expense')

For non-monosyllabic stems the meaning obtained by replacing the final vowel with ⟨o⟩ and applying nasalization is generally only that of the action.

[lɪbɛl̩lɑ] -lebella ('expect') → [tʼɪbɛl̩lɔ] tebello ('expectation')

Class 10 contains the plurals of class 9 nouns as well as the plurals of some class 5 nouns (from Proto-Bantu class 11).

The prefix is formed by adding di- to the full class 9 noun or adding di[N]- to the class 5 noun stem. Since the noun is formed by modifying the already modified class 9 stem (with the addition of Proto-Bantu prefix *dî-) this class is sometimes called 9a instead.

[din̩t͡sʰi] dintshi ('eyelashes')
[dipʼinɑ] dipina ('songs')
[dit͡ɬʰɑkʼɑ] ditlhaka (musical instrument made from reeds) plural of class 5 [lɪɬɑkʼɑ] lehlaka

Class 14 is the default class for abstract nouns, but it also contains some non-abstract nouns. Abstract nouns may be regularly formed from other nouns and from certain qualificatives (adjectives, relatives, and enumeratives). This class also contains many nouns which may be used as relatives (though nominal relatives do exist in almost all the noun classes).

The class prefix is bo- and comes from original Proto-Bantu *bu-.

[buˌdutʼu] bodutu ('loneliness')
[bʊʀɛnɑ] borena ('state of being a king') from the class 1 noun [mʊʀɛnɑ] morena
[bɪ] -be ('ugly') → [bʊbɪ] bobe ('ugliness')
[bʊɬʊkʼʊ] bohloko ('pain')
[bʊhɑdi] bohadi ('lobolo' non-abstract)

Class 15 exclusively contains verb infinitives and gerunds. These may be used syntactically as normal nouns with abstract meanings. Like English gerunds and infinitives, they may take direct objects and be inflected as other verbs, but they cannot be predicates (they do not complete a sentence like verbs and copulatives).

The class prefix is ho- and comes from original Proto-Bantu *ku-. This is prefixed to the verbal complex without the subjectival concord or certain verbal auxiliary infixes. Infinitives denoting a negative meaning are formed by inserting an infix -se- after the prefix and changing the final vowel to ⟨e⟩.

[t͡sʼʊfɑlɑ] -tsofala ('grow old') → [hʊt͡sʼʊfɑlɑ] ho tsofala ('to grow old') → [hʊsɪt͡sʼʊfɑlɪ] ho se tsofale ('to not grow old')
[bɔnɑ] -bona ('see') → [hʊm̩mɔnɑ] ho mmona ('to see her') → [hʊm̩mɔnɑmʊlɑtʼʊ] ho mmona molato ('to find her guilty' literally, 'to see her guilt'; this idiom preserves the archaic meaning "find" of [bɔnɑ] -bona, which is still present in Setswana)

Class 16 in Sesotho is a locative class containing only one member — [fɑt͡sʰɪ] fatshe ('down') (Proto-Bantu *pa-ci, plus an irregular nasalization of the stem; it appears as the unnasalized fase in Setswana) — used almost exclusively as an adverb. In many other Bantu languages, including Setswana, this class is productive, but this is no longer the case in Sesotho.

The class prefix is fa- and comes from original Proto-Bantu *pa- (denoting near positions). It uses exactly the same concords as those of class 15.

Note that the class 5 noun [lɪfɑt͡sʰɪ] lefatshe ('earth') is formed from this noun through prefix compounding.

Class 17 is a locative class containing few actual nouns (which are often used as adverbs). In many other Bantu languages, including Setswana, this class is productive, but this is no longer the case in Sesotho.

The class prefix is ho- and comes from original Proto-Bantu *ku- (denoting remote positions). It uses exactly the same concords as those of class 15.

The class 5 noun [lɪhuˌdimʊ] lehodimo ('heaven') is formed from one of the nouns in this class ([huˌdimʊ] hodimo 'above') through prefix compounding.

[hʊsɑnɪ] hosane ('tomorrow')
[hʊlɛ] hole ('far away')

Class 18 is a locative class containing a limited number of nouns (which are often used as adverbs). In many other Bantu languages, including Setswana, this class is productive, but this is no longer the case in Sesotho.

The class prefix is mo- and comes from Proto-Bantu *mu- (denoting close or internal positions). It is distinguished from other mo- classes (1 and 3) by its concords (it uses exactly the same concords as those of class 15).

[mʊse] mose ('overseas') this is a contraction of [mʊsehʊlɪwɑt͡ɬʼɛ] mose ho lewatle ('on the other side of the sea') an instance of the adverbial use

The Sesotho locative adverbs of place are the demonstrative pronouns of this class. Note that in this case the pronouns correspond to a mo- class prefix, instead of the class 15 concords which this class usually uses.

== Concords ==
Every part of speech in Sesotho which is somehow connected with a noun (either by qualifying it, associating it with an action or state, or standing in its place in an utterance) needs to be brought into agreement with the noun. This is done by a set of concords whose forms loosely resemble the noun prefixes. The concords are attached to the front of the parts of speech and result in utterances which sound mildly alliterative.

== Tones ==
Except for class 2a, the prefixes of the non-locative classes are null ("low") toned, while the set of possible tone patterns for the stem is large and obviously dependent on its length.

When certain high toned formatives (the conjunctive le-, the locative ho-, the possessive concord, and the subjectival concord for noun classes when forming positive copulatives) are prefixed to a noun with tonal pattern [ _ _ ] for the first two syllables including the noun prefix, the noun prefix's tone becomes high giving pattern [ ¯ ¯ _ ]. This does not happen if the second syllable of the noun is high. With monosyllabic stems the tone of the stem is raised as well.

[mʊʀɛnɑ] morena [ _ _ _ ] ('king') → [wɑmʊʀɛnɑ] wa morena [ ¯ ¯ _ _ ] of (class 1 or 3 possessive concord) ('the king'), [lɪmʊʀɛnɑ] le morena [ ¯ ¯ _ _ ] ('and the king')
[mʊt͡sʼɪ] motse [ _ _ ] ('village') → [hʊmʊt͡sʼɪ] ho motse [ ¯ ¯ ¯ ] ('to the village')

== Derivation ==
In the Bantu languages, nouns form an open class with new nouns regularly and actively being created from nouns and other parts of speech through predictable methods.

=== From nouns ===
Many nouns can be derived from other nouns, usually through the use of suffixes.

- Most abstract nouns can be created by substituting bo- for the prefix:
  [mʊsɑdi] mosadi ('woman') → [bʊsɑdi] bosadi ('femininity')
- Proper names based on nouns belong to class 1a, no matter what the original class was
- Often parents assume the names of their children by prefixing the name with Ra- (for the father; note the Setswana Rra- and the Setswana noun rre father) or Mma- (for the mother; this is more often than not simply shortened to Ma-). Also, a married woman may assume a name based on the Mma- prefix and her husband's surname/praise name.
- Most nouns can form new nouns with the diminutive suffixes -ana (sometimes -ane), [ɑɲɑnɪ] -anyane, and [ɲɑnɑ] -nyana. Often stems ending in the high vowels undergo various phonetic changes (palatalization, alveolarization, and velarization) due to the initial vowel in the suffixes:
  [tʰebe] thebe *('shield') → [tʰeʒɑnɪ] thejane ('small shield')
- The suffix [hɑdi] -hadi is often used to create the feminine of some nouns and the augmentative of some others:
  [xosi] kgosi ('king') → [xosihɑdi] kgosihadi ('queen')
- Sometimes the last 2 syllables of a noun may be repeated to indicate quantity, irregularity, or repetition:
  [dixomʊ] dikgomo ('cows') → [dixomʊxomʊ] dikgomo-kgomo ('herds of cattle')
- A curious formation exists in Sesotho which creates nouns with the meaning of "pseudo-x" by employing the prefix [sɪkʼɑ] seka- (which also has the effect of placing the noun in class 5). The same prefix is also used in slightly non-standard speech to create similes.
  [bu'ɑ] -bua ('speak') → [pʼu'o] puo language → [sɪkʼɑpu'o] sekapuo ('idiomatic speech')

=== From qualificatives ===
Qualificatives can be used to derive abstract nouns in class 14 by prefixing bo-.

Adjective [ŋɑtʼɑ] -ngata ('many') → [bʊŋɑtʼɑ] bongata ('quantity')
Relative [tʰɑtʼɑ] -thata ('hard') → [bʊtʰɑtʼɑ] bothata ('difficulty')
Enumerative [sɪlɪ] -sele ('other') → [bʊsɪlɪ] bosele ('otherness')

=== From ideophones ===
Some nouns are irregularly (and often idiomatically) derived from ideophones by reduplication:

[mɛt͡ɬʼɛ] metle ('of striking') → [sɪmɛt͡ɬʼɛmɛt͡ɬʼɛ] semetle-metle ('big news')

=== From verbs ===
Nouns of most classes are very actively and regularly derived from verbs. What follows is only a brief and incomplete overview.

[ʀɑtʼɑ] -rata ('love') →

1. [mʊʀɑtʼi] morati (and class 2 plural) ('lover')
5. [lɪʀɑtʼɔ] lerato (and class 6 plural) ('love')
7. [sɪʀtʼi] serati (and class 7 plural) ('lover')
9. [tʰɑtʼɔ] thato (and class 10 plural) ('desire')
14. [bʊʀɑtʼi] borati ('state of one who loves')
15. [hʊʀɑtʼɑ] ho rata ('to love')

Note that:

- The noun stem, with a few idiomatic exceptions, fossilizes the tone pattern of the infinitive of the verb (in this example it is [ ¯ _ ], giving [ _ ¯ _ ] for the complete noun including the prefix)
- Infinitives are strictly class 15 nouns (gerunds) derived from verb stems
- Class 14 nouns are almost always derived from other nouns, not from the verb directly
- With personal nouns, the difference between classes 1 and 7 is often that the class 7 agent performs the action habitually or with proficiency:
  [xɑn̩nɑ] -kganna drive → [mʊxɑn̩ni] mokganni driver and [sɪxɑn̩ni] sekganni professional driver

Generally, agents are formed in classes 1 and 7 by adding the prefix and changing the final vowel to /i/ i, while impersonal nouns are formed in several classes by adding the prefix and changing the final vowel to /ɔ/ o:

[ʀu'ɑ] -rua ('be rich') → class 1 [muˌʀu'i] morui rich person, and class 3 [muˌʀu'ɔ] moruo ('wealth')

There are, however, some impersonal nouns which end with i. Even if they begin with the ambiguous class prefix mo-, nouns denoting non-human entities cannot be in class 1.

[ɛlɑ] -ela flow → [mʊ'ɛlɑ] moela ('stream'), and [mʊ'edi] moedi ('waterway') both in class 3

Agents derived from passive verbs often use the full passive suffix -uwa, and never change the final vowel:

[ʀɑtʼɑ] -rata ('love') → [ʀɑtʼuwɑ] -ratuwa / [ʀɑtʼʷɑ] -ratwa ('be loved') → [mʊʀɑtʼuwɑ] moratuwa ('beloved')

=== Compound nouns ===
A rich source of nouns are nominal compounds formed (somewhat irregularly) from other parts of speech and even complete sentences. Note that the use of dashes to separate their parts is also irregular and usually based on the popularity and utility of the noun, and the Lesotho and South African orthographies tend to differ (with the Lesotho orthography tending to prefer dashes more).

[bʊɬɑɲɑbɑpʼɛʀɛ] bohlanya ba pere ('horse madness') → [bʊɬɑɲɑbɑpʼɛʀɛ] bohlanya-ba-pere Aristida Burkei ('grass')
[hʊʒɑdit͡ɬʰɑpʼi] ho ja ditlhapi ('to eat fish' traditionally considered taboo) → [mʊʒɑt͡ɬʰɑpʼi] Mojatlhapi ('English person' derisive)
[huˌdulɑsiˌtʼulo] ho dula setulo ('to sit in a chair') → [muˌdulɑsiˌtʼulo] modulasetulo ('chairperson')
[hʊjɑlɪmɔjɑ] ho ya le moya ('to be carried by the wind') → [sɪjɑlɪmɔjɑ] seyalemoya ('radio receiver')
[kʼɪ'ɑt͡sʼɪbɑ] ke a tseba ('I know') → class 2a [bokʼɪ'ɑt͡sʼɪbɑ] bokeatseba ('doctors')
[lɪ'emedi] leemedi ('pronoun') (cf. [ɛmɑ] -ema 'stand' → [ɛmɛlɑ] -emela 'stand for') + [ǃʰɔ] qho! ('ideophone of being absolute') → [le'emediǃʰɔ] lemediqho ('absolute pronoun')

As in many other languages, compounds indicating possession (genitive compounds) may be formed by following the possessee with the possessor ("X of Y" become "X-Y" — the English equivalent is "Y's X" or "Y-X"). This may also be done with the descriptive possessive.

[mʊlɑ'ɔ] molao ('law') + [mʊtʰɛ'ɔ] motheo ('foundation') → [mʊlɑ'ɔwɑmʊtʰɛ'ɔ] molao wa motheo ('founding law') → [mʊlɑ'ɔtʰɛ'ɔ] molaotheo ('constitution')
[siˌsi'u] sesiu ('grain basket') + [lɪsedi] lesedi ('sunshine') → [siˌsi'usedi] sesiu-sedi ('database')

=== Foreign (non-Bantu nor Khoisan) acquisitions ===
Many Sesotho nouns (and other parts of speech) stem from contact with speakers of Indo-European languages, primarily French missionaries, Orange Free State Afrikaners, and, in modern times, English people. The very alien phonetics and phonologies of these languages mean that words are to be imported rather irregularly with varying phonetic transformations.

French bonbon → [dipʼom̩pʼoŋ̩] dipompong ('sweets')
English heathen → class 1 [mʊhetʼenɪ] mohetene ('heathen')
Afrikaans Boer → class 5 [liˌbuʀu] Leburu ('Afrikaner')
English teacher → class 9 [tit͡ʃʰɛʀɛ] titjhere ('male teacher') note that the English "silent r" is rendered
Afrikaans venster ('window' cf. Latin fenestra) → class 9 [fɛstʼɛʀɛ] festere (note the consonant cluster)
English speaker → class 7 [spʼikʼɑʀɑ] spikara ('loudspeaker') with class 8 plural [dipʼikʼɑʀɑ] dipikara as if the cluster ⟨sp⟩ was a contraction of sep-

== Notes ==
Impolite
