= Sotho phonology =

Sounds and pronunciation of the Sotho language

The phonology of Sotho and those of the other Sotho–Tswana languages are radically different from those of "older" or more "stereotypical" Bantu languages. Modern Sesotho in particular has very mixed origins (due to the influence of Difaqane refugees) inheriting many words and idioms from non-Sotho–Tswana languages.

There are in total 39 consonantal phonemes (plus 2 allophones) and 9 vowel phonemes (plus two close raised allophones). The consonants include a rich set of affricates and palatal and postalveolar consonants, as well as three click consonants.

== Historical sound changes ==
Probably the most radical sound innovation in the Sotho–Tswana languages is that the Proto-Bantu prenasalized consonants have become simple stops and affricates. Thus isiZulu words such as entabeni ('on the mountain'), impuphu ('flour'), ezinkulu ('the big ones'), ukulanda ('to fetch'), ukulamba ('to become hungry'), and ukuthenga ('to buy') are cognates to Sesotho [tʰɑbeŋ̩] thabeng, [pʰʊfʊ] phofo, [t͡sʼexʊlʊ] tse kgolo, [hʊlɑtʼɑ] ho lata, [hʊlɑpʼɑ] ho lapa, and [hʊʀɛkʼɑ] ho reka, respectively (with the same meanings).

This is further intensified by the law of nasalization and nasal homogeneity, making derived and imported words have syllabic nasals followed by homogeneous consonants, instead of prenasalized consonants.

Another important sound change in Sesotho which distinguishes it from almost all other Sotho–Tswana languages and dialects is the chain shift from /x/ and /k͡xʰ/ to /h/ and /x/ (the shift of /k͡xʰ/ to /x/ is not yet complete).

In certain respects, however, Sesotho is more conservative than other Sotho–Tswana languages. For example, the language still retains the difference in pronunciation between /ɬ/, /t͡ɬʰ/, and /tʰ/. Many other Sotho–Tswana languages have lost the fricative /ɬ/, and some Northern Sotho languages, possibly influenced by Tshivenda, have also lost the lateral affricate and pronounce all three historical consonants as /tʰ/ (they have also lost the distinction between /t͡ɬ/ and /t/ — thus, for example, speakers of the Northern Sotho language commonly called Setlokwa call their language "Setokwa").

The existence of (lightly) ejective consonants (all unvoiced unaspirated stops) is very strange for a Bantu language and is thought to be due to Khoisan influence. These consonants occur in the Sotho–Tswana and Nguni languages (being over four times more common in Southern Africa than anywhere else in the world), and the ejective quality is strongest in isiXhosa, which has been greatly influenced by Khoisan phonology.

As with most other Bantu languages, almost all palatal and postalveolar consonants are due to some form of palatalization or other related phenomena which result from a (usually palatal) approximant or vowel being "absorbed" into another consonant (with a possible subsequent nasalization).

The Southern Bantu languages have lost the Bantu distinction between long and short vowels. In Sesotho the long vowels have simply been shortened without any other effects on the syllables; while sequences of two dissimilar vowels have usually resulted in the first vowel being "absorbed" into the preceding consonant, and causing changes such as labialization and palatalization.

As with most Southern African Bantu languages, the "composite" or "secondary" vowels *e and *o have become /ɛ, e/ and /ɔ, o/. These usually behave as two phonemes (conditioned by vowel harmony), although there are enough exceptions to justify the claim that they have become four separate phonemes in the Sotho–Tswana languages.

Additionally, the first-degree (or "superclose", "heavy") and second-degree vowels have not merged as in many other Bantu languages, resulting in a total of 9 phonemic vowels.

Almost uniquely among the Sotho–Tswana languages, Sesotho has adopted clicks. There is one place of articulation, alveolar, and three manners and phonations: tenuis, aspirated, and nasalized. These most probably came with loanwords from the Khoisan and Nguni languages, though they also exist in various words which don't exist in these languages and in various ideophones.

These clicks also appear in environments which are rare or non-existent in the Nguni and Khoisan languages, such as a syllabic nasal followed by a nasalized click ([ŋ̩ǃn] written ⟨nnq⟩, as in [ŋ̩ǃnɑnɪ] nnqane 'that other side'), a syllabic nasal followed by a tenuis click ([ŋ̩ǃ], also written ⟨nq⟩, as in [sɪŋ̩ǃɑŋ̩ǃɑnɪ] senqanqane 'frog'; this is not the same as the prenasalized radical click written ⟨nkq⟩ in the Nguni languages), and a syllabic nasal followed by an aspirated click ([ŋ̩ǃʰ] written ⟨nqh⟩, as in [sɪǃʰɪŋ̩ǃʰɑ] seqhenqha 'hunk').

== Vowels ==
Sesotho has a large inventory of vowels compared with many other Bantu languages. However, the nine phonemic vowels are collapsed into only five letters in the Sesotho orthography. The two close vowels i and u (sometimes called "superclose" or "first-degree" by Bantuists) are very high (with advanced tongue root) and are better approximated by French vowels than English vowels. That is especially true for /u/, which, in English, is often noticeably more fronted and can be transcribed as [u̟] or [ʉ] in the IPA; which is absent from Sesotho (and French).

Vowels
Audio sample of the examples

Approximate tongue positions for the 9 vowels, from Doke & Mofokeng (1974:?)

Vowels
/i/		/u/	
[huˌbit͡sʼɑ] ho bitsa ('to call')	beet	[tʼumɔ] tumo ('fame')	boot
/ɪ/		/ʊ/	
[hʊlɪkʼɑ] ho leka ('to attempt')	pit	[pʼʊt͡sʼɔ] potso ('query')	put
/e/		/o/	
[hʊʒʷet͡sʼɑ] ho jwetsa ('to tell')	cafe	[pʼon̩t͡sʰɔ] pontsho ('proof')	yawn (RP, SAE)
/ɛ/		/ɔ/	
[hʊʃɛbɑ] ho sheba ('to look')	bed	[mʊŋɔlɔ] mongolo ('writing')	board
/ɑ/
[hʊˈɑbɛlɑ] ho abela ('to distribute')		spa	

== Consonants ==
The Sotho–Tswana languages are peculiar among the Bantu family in that most do not have any prenasalized consonants and have a rather-large number of heterorganic compounds. Sesotho, uniquely among the recognised and standardised Sotho–Tswana languages, also has click consonants, which were acquired from Khoisan and Nguni languages.

		Labial	Alveolar		Post- alveolar	Palatal	Velar	Uvular	Glottal
		Labial	median	lateral	Post- alveolar	Palatal	Velar	Uvular	Glottal
Click	glottalized				ᵏǃʼ				
Click	aspirated				ᵏǃʰ				
Click	nasal				ᵑǃ				
Nasal		m	n		ɲ		ŋ		
Plosive	ejective	pʼ	tʼ				kʼ		
Plosive	aspirated	pʰ	tʰ				kʰ		
Plosive	voiced	b	(d)^{1}						
Affricate	ejective		tsʼ	tɬʼ	tʃʼ				
Affricate	aspirated		tsʰ	tɬʰ	tʃʰ		kxʰ ~ x		
Continuant	voiceless	f	s	ɬ	ʃ		kxʰ ~ x		h ~ ɦ
Continuant	voiced		r	l	ʒ ~ dʒ	j	w	ʀ	h ~ ɦ

1. [d] is an allophone of /l/, occurring only before the close vowels (/i/ and /u/). Dialectical evidence shows that in the Sotho–Tswana languages /l/ was originally pronounced as a retroflex flap [ɽ] before the two close vowels.

Sesotho makes a three-way distinction between lightly ejective, aspirated and voiced stops in several places of articulation.

Stops
Audio sample of the examples

Stops
Place of articulation	IPA	Notes	Orthography	Example
bilabial	/pʼ/	unaspirated: spit	p	[pʼit͡sʼɑ] pitsa ('cooking pot')
bilabial	/pʰ/		ph	[pʰupʼut͡sʼɔ] phuputso ('investigation')
bilabial	/b/	this consonant is fully voiced	b	[lɪbɪsɪ] lebese ('milk')
alveolar	/tʼ/	unaspirated: stalk	t	[bʊtʼɑlɑ] botala ('greenness')
alveolar	/tʰ/		th	[tʰɑʀʊl̩lɔ] tharollo ('solution')
alveolar	[d]	an allophone of /l/, only occurring before the close vowels (/i/ and /u/)	d	[muˌdimʊ] Modimo ('God')
velar	/kʼ/	unaspirated: skill	k	[buˌˈikʼɑʀɑbɛlɔ] boikarabelo ('responsibility')
velar	/kʰ/	fully aspirated: kill; occurring mostly in old loanwords from Nguni languages and in ideophones	kh	[lɪkʰɔkʰɔ] lekhokho ('pap baked onto the pot')

Sesotho possesses four simple nasal consonants. All of these can be syllabic and the syllabic velar nasal may also appear at the end of words.

Nasals
Audio sample of the examples

Nasals
Place of articulation	IPA	Notes	Orthography	Example
bilabial	/m/		m	[hʊmɑmɑʀet͡sʼɑ] ho mamaretsa ('to glue')
bilabial	/m̩/	syllabic version of the above	m	[m̩pɑ] mpa ('stomach')
alveolar	/n/		n	[lɪnɑnɛˈɔ] lenaneo ('programme')
alveolar	/n̩/	syllabic version of the above	n	[n̩nɑ] nna ('I')
alveolo-palatal	/ɲ/	a bit like Spanish el niño	ny	[hʊɲɑlɑ] ho nyala ('to marry')
alveolo-palatal	/ɲ̩/	syllabic version of the above	n	[ɲ̩ɲeʊ] nnyeo ('so-and-so')
velar	/ŋ/	can occur initially	ng	[lɪŋɔlɔ] lengolo ('letter')
velar	/ŋ̩/	syllabic version of the above	n	[hʊŋ̩kʼɑ] ho nka ('to take')

The following approximants occur. All instances of /w/ and /j/ most probably come from original close /ʊ/, /ɪ/, /u/, and /i/ vowels or Proto-Bantu *u, *i, *û, and *î (under certain circumstances).

Note that when ⟨w⟩ appears as part of a syllable onset this actually indicates that the consonant is labialized.

Approximants
Audio sample of the examples

Approximants
Place of articulation	IPA	Notes	Orthography	Example
labial-velar	/w/		w	[sɪwɑ] sewa ('epidemic')
lateral	/l/	never occurs before close vowels (/i/ and /u/), where it becomes [d]	l	[sɪlɛpʼɛ] selepe ('axe')
lateral	/l̩/	a syllabic version of the above; note that if the sequence [l̩l] is followed by the close [i] or [u] then the second [l] is pronounced normally, not as a [d]	l	[mʊl̩lɔ] mollo ('fire')
palatal	/j/		y	[hʊt͡sʼɑmɑjɑ] ho tsamaya ('to walk')

The following fricatives occur. The glottal fricative is often voiced between vowels, making it barely noticeable. The alternative orthography used for the velar fricative is due to some loanwords from Afrikaans and ideophones which were historically pronounced with velar fricatives, distinct from the velar affricate. The voiced postalveolar affricative sometimes occurs as an alternative to the fricative.

Fricatives
Audio sample of the examples

Fricatives
Place of articulation	IPA	Notes	Orthography	Example
labiodental	/f/		f	[huˌfumɑnɑ] ho fumana ('to find')
alveolar	/s/		s	[sɪsʊtʰʊ] Sesotho
postalveolar	/ʃ/		sh	[mʊʃʷɛʃʷɛ] Moshweshwe ('Moshoeshoe I')
postalveolar	/ʒ/		j	[mʊʒɑlɪfɑ] mojalefa ('heir
lateral	/ɬ/		hl	[hʊɬɑɬʊbɑ] ho hlahloba ('to examine')
velar	/x/		kg. Also ⟨g⟩ in Gauta ('Gauteng') [xɑˈutʼɑ] and some ideophones such as gwa ('of extreme whiteness') [xʷɑ]	[sɪxɔ] sekgo ('spider')
glottal	/h/		h	[hʊˈɑhɑ] ho aha ('to build')

There is one trill consonant. Originally, this was an alveolar rolled lingual, but today most individuals pronounce it at the back of the tongue, usually at the uvular position. The uvular pronunciation is largely attributed to the influence of French missionaries at Morija in Lesotho. Just like the French version, the position of this consonant is somewhat unstable and often varies even in individuals, but it generally differs from the "r"'s of most other South African language communities. The most stereotypical French-like pronunciations are found in certain rural areas of Lesotho, as well as some areas of Soweto (where this has affected the pronunciation of Tsotsitaal).

The trill
Audio sample of the example

Trill
Place of articulation	IPA	Notes	Notes	Orthography	Example
alveolar	/r/	can also be a tap	similar to the spanish perro'	r	[ke.a u ɾata] kea o rata ('I love you')
uvular	/ʀ/		soft Parisian-type r	r	[muˌʀiʀi] moriri ('hair')

Sesotho has a relatively large number of affricates. The velar affricate, which was standard in Sesotho until the early 20th century, now only occurs in some communities as an alternative to the more common velar fricative.

Affricates
Audio sample of the examples

Affricates
Place of articulation	IPA	Notes	Orthography	Example
alveolar	/t͡sʼ/		ts	[hʊt͡sʼʊkʼʊt͡sʼɑ] ho tsokotsa ('to rinse')
alveolar	/t͡sʰ/	aspirated	tsh	[hʊt͡sʰʊhɑ] ho tshoha ('to become frightened')
lateral	/t͡ɬʼ/		tl	[hʊt͡ɬʼɑt͡sʼɑ] ho tlatsa ('to fill')
lateral	/t͡ɬʰ/	occurs only as a nasalized form of hl or as an alternative to it	tlh	[t͡ɬʰɑhɔ] tlhaho ('nature')
postalveolar	/t͡ʃʼ/		tj	[ɲ̩t͡ʃʼɑ] ntja ('dog')
postalveolar	/t͡ʃʰ/		tjh	[hʊɲ̩t͡ʃʰɑfɑt͡sʼɑ] ho ntjhafatsa ('to renew')
postalveolar	/d͡ʒ/	this is an alternative to the fricative /ʒ/	j	[hʊd͡ʒɑ] ho ja ('to eat')
velar	/k͡xʰ/	alternative to the velar fricative	kg	[k͡xʰɑlɛ] kgale ('a long time ago')

The following click consonants occur. In common speech they are sometimes substituted with dental clicks. Even in standard Sesotho the nasal click is usually substituted with the tenuis click. ⟨nq⟩ is also used to indicate a syllabic nasal followed by an ejective click (/ŋ̩ǃkʼ/), while ⟨nnq⟩ is used for a syllabic nasal followed by a nasal click (/ŋ̩ǃŋ/).

Clicks
Audio sample of the examples

Clicks
Place of articulation	IPA	Notes	Orthography	Example
postalveolar	/ǃkʼ/	ejective	q	[hʊǃkʼɔǃkʼɑ] ho qoqa ('to chat')
postalveolar	/ᵑǃ/	nasal; this is often pronounced as an ejective click	nq	[hʊᵑǃʊsɑ] ho nqosa ('to accuse')
postalveolar	/ǃʰ/	aspirated	qh	[lɪǃʰekʼu] leqheku ('an elderly person')

The following heterorganic compounds occur. They are often substituted with other consonants, although there are a few instances when some of them are phonemic and not just allophonic. These are not considered consonant clusters.

In non-standard speech these may be pronounced in a variety of ways. bj may be pronounced /bj/ (followed by a palatal glide) and pj may be pronounced /pjʼ/. pj may also sometimes be pronounced /ptʃʼ/, which may alternatively be written ptj, though this is not to be considered standard.

Heterorganic compounds
Audio sample of the examples

Heterorganic compounds
Place of articulation	IPA	Notes	Orthography	Example
bilabial-palatal	/pʃʼ/	alternative tj	pj	[hʊpʃʼɑt͡ɬʼɑ] ho pjatla ('to cook well;)
bilabial-palatal	/pʃʰ/	aspirated version of the above; alternative tjh	pjh	[m̩pʃʰe] mpjhe ('ostrich')
bilabial-palatal	/bʒ/	alternative j	bj	[hʊbʒɑʀɑnɑ] ho bjarana ('to break apart')
labiodental-palatal	/fʃ/	only found in short passives of verbs ending with [fɑ] fa; alternative sh	fj	[hʊbɔfʃʷɑ] ho bofjwa ('to be tied')

== Syllable structure ==
Sesotho syllables tend to be open, with syllabic nasals and the syllabic approximant l also allowed. Unlike almost all other Bantu languages, Sesotho does not have prenasalized consonants (NC).

1. The onset may be any consonant (C), a labialized consonant (Cw), an approximant (A), or a vowel (V).
2. The nucleus may be a vowel, a syllabic nasal (N), or the syllabic l (L).
3. No codas are allowed.

The possible syllables are:

- V ho etsa ('to do') [hʊˈet͡sʼɑ]
- CV fi! ('ideophone of sudden darkness') [fi]
- CwV ho tswa ('to emerge') [hʊt͡sʼʷɑ]
- AV wena ('you') [wɛnɑ]
- N nna ('I') [n̩nɑ]
- L lebollo ('circumcision rite') [lɪbʊl̩lɔ]

Note that heterorganic compounds count as single consonants, not consonant clusters.

Additionally, the following phonotactic restrictions apply:

1. A consonant may not be followed by the palatal approximant /j/ (i.e. C+y is not a valid onset).
2. Neither the labio-velar approximant /w/ nor a labialized consonant may be followed by a back vowel at any time.

Syllabic l occurs only due to a vowel being elided between two l's:

[mʊlɪlɔ] *molelo (Proto-Bantu *mu-dido) > [mʊl̩lɔ] mollo ('fire') (cf Setswana molelo, isiZulu umlilo)
[hʊlɪlɑ] *ho lela (Proto-Bantu *-dida) > [hʊl̩lɑ] ho lla ('to cry') (cf Setswana go lela, isiXhosa ukulila, Tshivenda u lila)
isiZulu ukuphuma ('to emerge') > ukuphumelela ('to succeed') > Sesotho [hʊpʰʊmɛl̩lɑ] ho phomella

There are no contrastive long vowels in Sesotho, the rule being that juxtaposed vowels form separate syllables (which may sound like long vowels with undulating tones during natural fast speech). Originally there might have been a consonant between vowels which was eventually elided that prevented coalescence or other phonological processes (Proto-Bantu *g, and sometimes *j).

Other Bantu languages have rules against vowel juxtaposition, often inserting an intermediate approximant if necessary.

Sesotho [xɑˈutʼeŋ̩] Gauteng ('Gauteng') > isiXhosa Erhawudeni

== Phonological processes ==
Vowels and consonants very often influence one another resulting in predictable sound changes. Most of these changes are either vowels changing vowels, nasals changing consonants, or approximants changing consonants. The sound changes are nasalization, palatalization, alveolarization, velarization, vowel elision, vowel raising, and labialization. Sesotho nasalization and vowel-raising are extra-strange since, unlike most processes in most languages, they actually decrease the sonority of the phonemes.

Nasalization (alternatively Nasal permutation or Strengthening) is a process in Bantu languages by which, in certain circumstances, a prefixed nasal becomes assimilated to a succeeding consonant and causes changes in the form of the phone to which it is prefixed. In the Sesotho language series of articles it is indicated by ⟨N⟩.

In Sesotho it is a fortition process and usually occurs in the formation of class 9 and 10 nouns, in the use of the objectival concord of the first person singular, in the use of the adjectival and enumerative concords of some noun classes, and in the forming of reflexive verbs (with the reflexive prefix).

Very roughly speaking, voiced consonants become devoiced and fricatives (except /x/) lose their fricative quality.

Vowels and the approximant /w/ get a /kʼ/ in front of them

- Voiced stops become ejective:
  /b/ > /pʼ/
  /l/ > /tʼ/
- Fricatives become aspirated:
  /f/ > /pʰ/
  /ʀ/ > /tʰ/
  /s/ > /t͡sʰ/
  /ʃ/ > /t͡ʃʰ/
  /ɬ/ > /t͡ɬʰ/ (except with adjectives)
- /h/ becomes /x/
- /ʒ/ becomes /t͡ʃʼ/

The syllabic nasal causing the change is usually dropped, except for monosyllabic stems and the first person objectival concord. Reflexive verbs don't show a nasal.

[hʊˈɑʀbɑ] ho araba ('to answer') > [kʼɑʀɑbɔ] karabo ('response'), [hʊŋ̩kʼɑʀɑbɑ] ho nkaraba ('to answer me'), and [huˌˈikʼɑʀɑbɑ] ho ikaraba ('to answer oneself')
[hʊfɑ] ho fa ('to give') > [m̩pʰɔ] mpho ('gift'), [hʊm̩pʰɑ] ho mpha ('to give me'), and [huˌˈipʰɑ] ho ipha ('to give oneself')

Other changes may occur due to contractions in verb derivations:

[hʊbɔnɑ] ho bona ('to see') > [hʊbon̩t͡sʰɑ] ho bontsha ('to cause to see') (causative [bɔn] -bon- + [isɑ] -isa)

Nasal homogeneity consists of two points:

1. When a consonant is preceded by a (visible or invisible) nasal it will undergo nasalization, if it supports it.
2. When a nasal is immediately followed by another consonant with no vowel betwixt them, the nasal will change to a nasal in the same approximate position as the following consonant, after the consonant has undergone nasal permutation. If the consonant is already a nasal then the previous nasal will simply change to the same.

Palatalization is a process in certain Bantu languages where a consonant becomes a palatal consonant.

In Sesotho it usually occurs with the short form of passive verbs and the diminutives of nouns, adjectives, and relatives.

- Labials:
  /pʼ/ > /pʃʼ/ / /t͡ʃʼ/
  /pʰ/ > /pʃʰ/ / /t͡ʃʰ/
  /b/ > /bʒ/ / /ʒ/
  /f/ > /fʃ/ / /ʃ/
- Alveolars:
  /tʼ/ > /t͡ʃʼ/
  /tʰ/ > /t͡ʃʰ/
  /l/ > /ʒ/
- The nasals become /ɲ/:
  /n/, /m/, and /ŋ/ > /ɲ/

For example:

[hʊlɪfɑ] ho lefa ('to pay') > [hʊlɪfʃʷɑ] ho lefjwa / [hʊlɪʃʷɑ] ho leshwa ('to be paid')

Alveolarization is a process whereby a consonant becomes an alveolar consonant. It occurs in noun diminutives, the diminutives of colour adjectives, and in the pronouns and concords of noun classes with a [di] di- or [di] di[N]- prefix. This results in either /t͡sʼ/ or /t͡sʰ/.

- /pʼ/, /b/, and /l/ become /t͡sʼ/
- /pʰ/, /f/, and /ʀ/ become /t͡sʰ/

Examples:

[xʷɑdi] -kgwadi ('black with white spots') > [xʷɑt͡sʼɑnɑ] -kgwatsana (diminutive)
[dikʼet͡sʼɔ t͡sʼɑhɑˈʊ] diketso tsa hao ('your actions')

Other changes may occur due to phonological interactions in verbal derivatives:

[hʊbʊt͡sʼɑ] ho botsa ('to ask') > [hʊbʊt͡sʼet͡sʼɑ] ho botsetsa ('to ask on behalf of') (applied [bʊt͡sʼ] -bots- + [ɛlɑ] -ela)

The alveolarization which changes Sesotho /l/ to /t͡sʼ/ is by far the most commonly applied phonetic process in the language. It's regularly applied in the formation of some class 8 and 10 concords and in numerous verbal derivatives.

Velarization in Sesotho is a process whereby certain sounds become velar consonants due to the intrusion of an approximant. It occurs with verb passives, noun diminutives, the diminutives of relatives, and the formation of some class 1 and 3 prefixes.

- /m/ becomes /ŋ/
- /ɲ/ becomes /ŋ̩ŋ/

For example:

[hʊsɪɲɑ] ho senya ('to destroy') > [hʊsɪŋ̩ŋʷɑ] ho senngwa ('to be destroyed') (short passive [sɪɲ] -seny- + [wɑ] -wa)
Class 1 [mʊ] mo- + [ɑhɑ] -aha > [ŋʷɑhɑ] ngwaha ('year') (cf Kiswahili mwaka; from Proto-Bantu *-jaka)

Elision of vowels occurs in Sesotho less often than in those Bantu languages which have vowel "pre-prefixes" before the noun class prefixes (such as isiZulu), but there are still instances where it regularly and actively occurs.

There are two primary types of regular vowel elision:

1. The vowels /ɪ/, /ɛ/, and /ʊ/ may be removed from between two instances of /l/, thereby causing the first /l/ to become syllabic. This actively occurs with verbs, and has historically occurred with some nouns.
2. When forming class 1 or 3 nouns from noun stems beginning with /b/ the middle /ʊ/ is removed and the /b/ is contracted into the /m/, resulting in [m̩m]. This actively occurs with nouns derived from verbs commencing with [b] and has historically occurred with many other nouns.

For example:

[bɑlɑ] -bala ('read') > [bɑl̩lɑ] -balla (applied verb suffix [ɛlɑ] -ela) ('read for'), and [m̩mɑdi] mmadi ('person who reads')

Vowel raising is a form of vowel harmony where a non-open vowel (i.e. any vowel other than /ɑ/) is raised in position by a following vowel (in the same phonological word) at a higher position. The first variety — in which the open-mid vowels become close-mid — is commonly found in most Southern African Bantu languages (where the Proto-Bantu "mixed" vowels have separated). In the 9-vowel Sotho–Tswana languages, a much less common process also occurs where the near-close vowels become raised to a position slightly lower than the close vowels (closer to the English beat and boot than the very high Sesotho vowels i and u) without ATR (or, alternatively, with both [+ATR] and [+RTR]).

Mid vowel raising is a process where /ɛ/ becomes /e/ and /ɔ/ becomes /o/ under the influence of close vowels or consonants that contain "hidden" close vowels.

Vowel raising of the open-mid vowels
Audio sample of the examples

ho tsheha ('to laugh') [hʊt͡sʰɛhɑ] > ho tshehisa ('to cause to laugh') [hʊt͡sʰehisɑ]
ke a bona ('I see') [kʼɪˈɑbɔnɑ] > ke bone ('I saw') [kʼɪbonɪ]
ho kena ('to enter') [hʊkʼɛnɑ] > ho kenya ('to insert') [hʊkʼeɲɑ]

These changes are usually recursive to varying depths within the word, though, being a left spreading rule, it is often bounded by the difficulty of "foreseeing" the raising syllable:

diphoofolo ('animals') [dipʰɔˈɔfɔlɔ] > diphoofolong ('by the animals') [dipʰɔˈɔfoloŋ̩]

Additionally, a right-spreading form occurs when a close-mid vowel is on the penultimate syllable (that is, the stressed syllable) and, due to some inflection or derivational process, is followed by an open-mid vowel. In this case the vowel on the final syllable is raised. This does not happen if the penultimate syllable is close (/i/ or (/u/).

-besa ('roast') [besɑ] > subjunctive ke bese ('so I may roast...') [kʼɪbese]

but

-thola ('find') [tʰɔlɑ] > subjunctive ke thole ('so I may find...') [kʼɪtʰɔlɛ]

These vowels can occur phonemically, however, and may thus be considered to be separate phonemes:

maele ('wisdom') [mɑˈele]
ho retla ('to dismantle') [hʊʀet͡ɬʼɑ]

Close vowel raising is a process which occurs under much less common circumstances. Near-close /ɪ/ becomes [iˌ] and near-close /ʊ/ becomes [uˌ] when immediately followed by a syllable containing the close vowels /i/ or /u/. Unlike the mid vowel raising this processes is not iterative and is only caused directly by the close vowels (it cannot be caused by any hidden vowels or by other raised vowels).

Vowel raising of the near-close vowels
Audio sample of the examples

[hʊt͡sʰɪlɑ] ho tshela ('to pass over') > [hʊt͡sʰiˌdisɑ] ho tshedisa ('to comfort')
[hʊlʊmɑ] ho loma ('to itch') > [sɪluˌmi] selomi ('period pains')

Since these changes are allophonic, the Sotho–Tswana languages are rarely said to have 11 vowels.

Labialization is a modification of a consonant due to the action of a bilabial /w/ element which persists throughout the articulation of the consonant and is not merely a following semivowel. This labialization results in the consonant being pronounced with rounded lips (but, in Sesotho, with no velarization) and with attenuated high frequencies (especially noticeable with fricatives and aspirated consonants).

It may be traced to an original /ʊ/ or /u/ being "absorbed" into the preceding consonant when the syllable is followed by another vowel. The consonant is labialized and the transition from the labialized syllable onset to the nucleus vowel sounds like a bilabial semivowel (or, alternatively, like a diphthong). Unlike in languages such as Chishona and Tshivenda, Sesotho labialization does not result in "whistling" of any consonants.

Almost all consonants may be labialized (indicated in the orthography by following the symbol with ⟨w⟩), the exceptions being labial stops and fricatives (which become palatalized), the bilabial and palatal nasals (which become velarized), and the voiced alveolar [d] allophone of /l/ (which would become alveolarized instead). Additionally, syllabic nasals (where nasalization results in a labialized [ŋ̩kʼ] instead) and the syllabic /l/ (which is always followed by the non-syllabic /l/) are never directly labialized. Note that the unvoiced heterorganic doubled articulant fricative /fʃ/ only occurs labialized (only as [fʃʷ]).

Due to the inherent bilabial semivowel, labialized consonants never appear before back vowels:

[hʊlɑt͡sʼʷɑ] ho latswa ('to taste') > [tʼɑt͡sʼɔ] tatso ('flavour')
[hʊt͡sʼʷɑ] ho tswa ('to emerge') > [lɪt͡sʼɔ] letso ('a derivation')
[hʊnʷɑ] ho nwa ('to drink') > [sɪnɔ] seno ('a beverage')
[hʊˈɛlɛl̩lʷɑ] ho elellwa ('to realise') > [kʼɛlɛl̩lɔ] kelello ('the mind')

== Tonology ==
Sesotho is a tonal language spoken using two contrasting tones: low and high; further investigation reveals, however, that in reality it is only the high tones that are explicitly specified on the syllables in the speaker's mental lexicon, and that low tones appear when a syllable is tonally under-specified. Unlike the tonal systems of languages such as Mandarin, where each syllable basically has an immutable tone, the tonal systems of the Niger–Congo languages are much more complex in that several "tonal rules" are used to manipulate the underlying high tones before the words may be spoken, and this includes special rules ("melodies") which, like grammatical or syntax rules that operate on words and morphemes, may change the tones of specific words depending on the meaning one wishes to convey.

== Stress ==
The word stress system of Sesotho (often called "penultimate lengthening" instead, though there are certain situations where it doesn't fall on the penultimate syllable) is quite simple. Each complete Sesotho word has exactly one main stressed syllable.

Except for the second form of the first demonstrative pronoun, certain formations involving certain enclitics, polysyllabic ideophones, most compounds, and a handful of other words, there is only one main stress falling on the penult.

The stressed syllable is slightly longer and has a falling tone. Unlike in English, stress does not affect vowel quality or height.

This type of stress system occurs in most of those Eastern and Southern Bantu languages which have lost contrastive vowel length.

The second form of the first demonstrative pronoun has the stress on the final syllable. Some proclitics can leave the stress of the original word in place, causing the resultant word to have the stress at the antepenultimate syllable (or even earlier, if the enclitics are compounded). Ideophones, which tend to not obey the phonetic laws which the rest of the language abides by, may also have irregular stress.

There is even at least one minimal pair: the adverb fela ('only') [ˈfɛlɑ] has regular stress, while the conjunctive fela ('but') [fɛˈlɑ] (like many other conjunctives) has stress on the final syllable. This is certainly not enough evidence to justify making the claim that Sesotho is a stress accent language, though.

Because the stress falls on the penultimate syllable, Sesotho, like other Bantu languages (and unlike many closely allied Niger–Congo languages), tends to avoid monosyllabic words and often employs certain prefixes and suffixes to make the word disyllabic (such as the syllabic nasal in front of class 9 nouns with monosyllabic stems, etc.).
