= Morphogram =

Writing of morphemes based on meaning

A morphogram is the representation of a morpheme by a grapheme based solely on its meaning. Kanji is a writing system that makes use of morphograms, where Chinese characters were borrowed to represent native morphemes because of their meanings. Thus, a single character can represent a variety of morphemes which originally all had the same meaning. An example of this in Japanese would be the grapheme 東 [east], which can be read as higashi or azuma, in addition to its logographic representation of the morpheme tō. Additionally, in Japanese, the logographic (Chinese-derived) reading is called the on'yomi reading, and the morphographic reading (native Japanese) is called the kun'yomi reading.

== See also ==
- Logogram
