= Ayeye =

- Genre: Drama
- Written by: Sunni Faba; Justine Loots; Desireé Markgraaff
- Directed by: Angus Gibson; Teboho Mahlatsi
- Starring: Thapelo Mokoena; Sthembiso Khoza; Mpho Modikoane
- Theme music composer: Philip Miller
- Country of origin: South Africa
- Original languages: English; Zulu; Sesotho
- No. of seasons: 1
- No. of episodes: 13

Production
- Executive producer: Desireé Markgraaff
- Producers: Angus Gibson; Desireé Markgraaff; Kutlwano Ditsele
- Cinematography: Zeno Petersen
- Editor: Jeremy Briers
- Running time: 46–52 minutes
- Production company: The Bomb Shelter

Original release
- Network: Mzansi Magic
- Release: May 22 – August 14, 2015

Related
- Ayeye: Stripped (Season 2)

Ayeye is a South African drama television series created by BOMB, executive producer Desireé Markgraaff. It is an M-Net original series, produced by The Bomb Shelter for MultiChoice Studios. The series premiered on Mzansi Magic on 22 May 2015 in South Africa, and began streaming worldwide on Showmax in 2017, starring Thapelo Mokoena, Sthembiso Khoza, and Mpho Modikoane.

== Plot ==
Ayeye follows the lives, loves, heartaches, fears, and dreams of three friends working as rockstar creatives at a hotshot Sandton advertising agency, and sharing a loft apartment in Maboneng.

== Cast ==
=== Main ===
- Thapelo Mokoena as Jacaranda or "JK"
- Sthembiso Khoza as Neo
- Mpho Modikoane as Lebo

=== Supporting ===
- Jessica Nkosi as Eve
- Warren Masemola as Eugene
- Lizwi Vilakazi as Teddy
- Nomsa Xaba as Gogo
- David Butler as Marty
- Bonginkosi Dlamini as Isaac
- Zethu Dlomo as Sibongile
- Robert Hobbs as Rev
- Kaone Kario as Leano
- Vusi Kunene as Khoza Senior
- Zandile Lujabe as Ziyanda
- Karabo Magongwa as Azania
- Khanyi Mbau as Thenjiwe
- Somizi Mhlongo as Baps

== Episode ==
Each episode is released every Friday on Mzansi Magic.

Season	Episodes	Originally released	
Season	Episodes	First released	Last released
1	13	May 22, 2015	August 14, 2015
2	13	August 5, 2022	October 28, 2022

=== Season 1 (2015) ===
No.	Title	Original release date
1	TBA	22 May 2015
The boys PSA has been nominated for a Cannes Lion and they a wait with bated breath to find out if they have won anything. Lebo, who never has luck with women, finally finds a match, but there is a problem.
2	TBA	29 May 2015
The PSA causes controversy and the boys do their best to defend it, but they find opposition in their own agency. All 3 guys find themselves on shaky ground as they try to re-negotiate their various relationships.
3	TBA	5 June 2015
Tensions are high as JK and the boys try to grasp their award winning advert being pulled off Television by KT&T. JK and Isaac, the leader of the recyclers have a heated confrontation.
4	TBA	12 June 2015
Ziyanda takes matters into her own hands in trying to save her relationship with Lebo as she confronts JK at work. Lebo realizes that his father’s condition may be more serious than he had originally thought.
5	TBA	19 June 2015
Neo learns of the financial pressures that come with fatherhood. Neo and JK embark on finding new clients. JK finally realises that Eve is willing to move on with her love life.
6	TBA	26 June 2015
Lebo has to find a way to tell JK & Neo that Sphynx has signed with KT&T and will not sign with Ayeye. Neo and JK are in conflict regarding pitching to Eve’s company. Ziyanda and Lebo run into trouble with the law.
7	TBA	3 July 2015
The arrival of Leano sets Neo off into an emotional roller coaster. Ziyanda and Lebo struggle to adjust to life in a jail cell. JK and Lebo have a physical altercation that leaves Lebo winded on the floor.
8	TBA	10 July 2015
The boys are still estranged and an attempted mugging on Cindy near the recyclers brings them back together. Lebo negotiates to have sex with Ziyanda in the loft after numerous failed attempts with dodgy hotels.
9	TBA	17 July 2015
Neo is made an offer to come back to work at KT&T. Eve and Thenji force Khoza Snr to return to work at the agency to pitch for their account.
10	TBA	24 July 2015
Leano gives the boys a taste of their own medicine. After the fight, JK makes a terrible decision and breaks his sobriety.
11	TBA	31 July 2015
Ayeye follows the lives, loves, heartache, fears and dreams of three friends who share a loft apartment in Maboneg, working as rockstar creatives at a hotshot Sandton advertising agency.
12	TBA	7 August 2015
Ayeye follows the lives, loves, heartache, fears and dreams of three friends who share a loft apartment in Maboneg, working as rockstar creatives at a hotshot Sandton advertising agency.
13	TBA	14 August 2015
Ayeye follows the lives, loves, heartache, fears and dreams of three friends who share a loft apartment in Maboneg, working as rockstar creatives at a hotshot Sandton advertising agency.

=== Season 2 (2022) ===
On 25 July 2022, Mzansi Magic announced the release date of the second season titled Ayeye: Stripped. It premiered on 5 August 2022, introducing a new lead character Rosemary Zimu as Zoleka and a new plot, focused on a single mother and her son. The second season was executively produced by Thabang Moleya, and written by Zaba LeRoto Hlatshwayo, which earned him a nomination at the 17th South African Film and Television Awards in the Best Achievement in Scriptwriting - TV Drama category in 2023.
