= Blood & Water (South African TV series) =

South African television series

- The Title Card of Blood & Water
- Genre: Drama
- Written by: Nosipho Dumisa-Ngoasheng; Daryne Joshua; Travis Taute
- Directed by: Nosipho Dumisa-Ngoasheng; Daryne Joshua; Travis Taute; Thati Peele (season 2)
- Starring: Ama Qamata; Khosi Ngema; Gail Mabalane; Natasha Thahane; Thabang Molaba
- Opening theme: "Blood & Water" by FRYA
- Composers: Mr Kamera; Kyle Shepherd
- Country of origin: South Africa
- Original languages: English; Xhosa; Multilingual (subtitled) (Note: Characters sometimes slip into other languages, especially in season 2, such as Zulu, Xhosa, Afrikaans, SeSotho, Shona, and Tswana.)
- No. of seasons: 4
- No. of episodes: 25

Production
- Executive producers: Bradley Joshua; Benjamin Overmeyer; Nosipho Dumisa-Ngoasheng; Daryne Joshua; Travis Taute; Simon Beesley
- Producers: Bradley Joshua; Benjamin Overmeyer
- Production locations: Cape Town, South Africa
- Cinematography: Zenn Van Zyl
- Editors: Simon Beesley; Tessa Verfuss; Andrea Shaw
- Running time: 43–53 minutes
- Production company: Gambit Films

Original release
- Network: Netflix
- Release: 20 May 2020 – 1 March 2024

Related
- Elite

Blood & Water is a South African teen crime drama television series developed by Gambit Films for Netflix starring Ama Qamata, Khosi Ngema and Gail Mabalane. Set in Cape Town, the series follows a girl who transfers to an elite school when she suspects one of the students may be her sister, who was abducted as a baby.

The initial season, comprising six episodes, premiered on Netflix on 20 May 2020. Following its release, Netflix announced the renewal of the series for a second season in June 2020, which debuted on 24 September 2021. A third season, announced in April 2022, premiered on 25 November 2022. A fourth season premiered on 1 March 2024. The series won Best TV Drama at the 2021 South African Film and Television Awards as well as awards for cinematography and sound design.

== Plot ==
The series revolves around Puleng, a high school girl whose sister Phume was kidnapped as part of a human trafficking network shortly after birth. On the same day of Phume's birthday Puleng was invited to a party of Fikile Bhele a popular athlete studying at Parkhurst College, a prestigious school in Cape Town. After Wade a new acquaintance points out their resemblance, Puleng starts to suspect that Fikile is Phume. She has lived in the shadow of her sister all her life so she decides to get to the bottom of things. She transfers to the elite school to investigate. While solving the puzzle, Puleng discovers that the mystery of her missing sister is not the only secret that her friends and family keep.

== Cast ==
=== Main ===
- Ama Qamata as Puleng Khumalo
- Khosi Ngema as Fikile "Fiks" Bhele (née Phumelele Khumalo), Puleng's newfound half-sister who was kidnapped by a human trafficking syndicate as a baby.
- Gail Mabalane as Thandeka Khumalo, Puleng's mother
- Thabang Molaba as Karabo "KB" Molapo, an aspiring rapper in Fikile's friend group and Puleng's ex-boyfriend
- Dillon Windvogel as Wade Daniels, the first student at Parkhurst to befriend Puleng and later became his girlfriend and also the son of the headmistress
- Arno Greeff as Christopher "Chris" Ackerman, a pansexual swimmer in Fikile's friend group and later Wendy's boyfriend.
- Ryle de Morny as Chad Morgan (season 1), the swim coach at Parkhurst
- Greteli Fincham as Reece van Rensburg, a girl in Fikile's friend group who deals drugs and is having financial troubles
- Getmore Sithole as Julius Khumalo, Puleng's father
- Odwa Gwanya as Siya Khumalo, Puleng's younger brother who begins attending Parkhurst in Season 3
- Natasha Thahane as Wendy Dlamini, daughter of an MP and head of the school magazine and later matric dance committee
- Mekaila Mathys as Tahira Kahn, Wendy's friend who runs against Fikile to be Head Girl, winning. She is stripped of her role as Head Girl in Season 3
- Sandi Schultz as Nicole Daniels, Parkhurst headmistress and Wade's mother
- Cindy Mahlangu as Zama Bolton (main, seasons 1-2; voice, season 3), Puleng's friend from Meadowridge who is involved with Chris
- Xolile Tshabalala as Nwabisa Bhele (seasons 1-2), Fikile's mother
- Sello Maake Ka-Ncube as Matla Molapo, KB's successful lawyer father
- Patrick Mofokeng as Brian Bhele, Fikile's father
- Shamilla Miller as Riley Morgan (main, season 1; recurring, season 3), Chad's wife
- Duane Wiliams as Mark Tedder (seasons 1–2), a love interest of Chris'
- Zikhona Sodlaka as Janet Nkosana (seasons 2–3), the new school counselor and Sam's mother
- Leroy Siyafa as Samuel "Sam" Nkosana (seasons 2–4), the son of the new school counselor and later Fikile's boyfriend
- Katishcka Kiara as Pauline (seasons 2–4)
- Alzavia Abrahams as Zayd (seasons 2–4)
- Inge Beckmann as Philippa van Rensburg (main, season 2; guest, season 3), Reece's mother
- Sonia Mbele as Lisbeth Molapo (guest, season 2; main, season 3), KB's mother
- Mpho Sibeko as Lunga Vezi (season 3-4), Puleng's Cousin
- Abduragman Adams as Detective Vaans (recurring, season 2; main, season 3)
- Nicole Fortuin as Detective Petersen (recurring, season 2; main, season 3-4)
- Meggan-Lee Johnstone as Leigh-Anne Valentine (recurring, season 2; main, season 3-4)
- Tumisho Masha as Harold Grootboom (season 3-4)
- Gary Joshua as Gabriel (season 3)
- Nasr Ho-Yee as Bruce Kwan (season 2-4)
- Clint Brink as Reinhard (season 3)
- Thapelo Mokoena as Anthony "Tony" Gabisa (season 3-4)
- Gantane Kusch as Lex Tom (season 3)
- Marco Spaumer as Kyle (season 3)
- Wanda Banda as Asanda Makeba (season 4), a new swimmer in Parkhurst and Fikile's enemy and Wade's love interest
- André Lamoglia as Iván Carvalho (season 4), (Note: André Lamoglia is credited as a series regular from 4x01 through 4x03.) a Brazilian exchange student from Las Encinas who enrolls at Parkhurst College on a scholarship.

=== Recurring ===
- Laura Bosman as Mrs. Joffe
- Andre Lombaard as Mr. Loots
- Baby Cele as Minister Dlamini
- Elzet Nel as Nate (seasons 1–2)
- Faniswa Yisa as Brenda Jaxa (seasons 1–2)
- Nasty C as Zhero (season 1)
- YoungstaCPT as himself (season 2)
- Ivan Botha as Hugo Ferreira (season 2)
- Ethan Brukman as Chase (season 3)
- Augusta Zietsman as Amber La Roux (season 3)
- Damien Wantenaar as Damian (season 4)
- Daanyaal Ally as Gregory Dickson (season 4)
- Masasa Mbangeni as Ms. Makeba (season 4)

== Episodes ==
Series	Episodes	Originally released
1	6	20 May 2020
2	7	24 September 2021
3	6	25 November 2022
4	6	1 March 2024

=== Season 1 (2020) ===
No. overall	No. in season	Title	Directed by	Written by	Original release date
1	1	"Fiksation"	Nosipho Dumisa	Daryne Joshua	20 May 2020
As another year passes since her sister's disappearance, Puleng shoulders her parents’ complex grief and escapes for a taste of joy... with a twist.
2	2	"The Interview"	Nosipho Dumisa	Travis Taute	20 May 2020
Puleng combines secrecy and strategy as she continues her quest for answers, and a special project leads to a closer bond with Fiks and her classmates.
3	3	"Propaganda"	Travis Taute	Nosipho Dumisa	20 May 2020
Fiks faces backlash while campaigning for Head Girl. Meanwhile, Puleng considers a pivotal decision: Share her mission with Wade or abandon the search?
4	4	"Payback's a Bitch"	Daryne Joshua	Travis Taute	20 May 2020
The tables turn as Puleng experiences her own school scandal. Later, she and Wade chase a new lead. Fiks struggles with the pitfalls of romance.
5	5	"Frenemy No. 1"	Daryne Joshua	Daryne Joshua	20 May 2020
After Wendy goes on record, Puleng grapples with regret ... and grows closer to KB. Fiks hosts a poolside gathering and deals with a devastating blow.
6	6	"Trippin'"	Nosipho Dumisa	Nosipho Dumisa	20 May 2020
Tensions mount at a party with KB's family and friends. Puleng prepares for her father's trial and examines a series of life-changing revelations.

=== Season 2 (2021) ===
No. overall	No. in season	Title	Directed by	Written by	Original release date
7	1	"New Kid Syndrome"	Nosipho Dumisa-Ngoasheng	Nosipho Dumisa-Ngoasheng	24 September 2021
A painful past meets an uncertain present as Fiks struggles with her identity. Meanwhile, a shocking request threatens to hamper Puleng's progress.
8	2	"Mayday"	Thati Pele	Nosipho Dumisa-Ngoasheng	24 September 2021
As Fiks grapples with a personal decision, Reece weighs the risk and reward of a new side hustle. Puleng plans a party with the help of a loyal friend.
9	3	"The Source"	Travis Taute	Daryne Joshua	24 September 2021
Dealing with a setback, Puleng asks for a favor. KB receives big news and faces a tough critic. A school assignment sparks entrepreneurial interest.
10	4	"Spiyoyo"	Daryne Joshua	Mmabatho Montsho	24 September 2021
Tension mounts between Puleng and Wade, a lavish tea party takes shape, Reece raises the stakes of her game, and Fiks encounters a sweet surprise.
11	5	"Puleng vs. The World"	Daryne Joshua	Nelisa Ngcobo	24 September 2021
Fiks and Puleng chase a new lead ... and deal with the consequences. Reece agrees to a new responsibility, and KB prepares for a performance.
12	6	"Dark Times"	Nosipho Dumisa-Ngoasheng	Chinaka Iwunze	24 September 2021
An outburst reshapes Puleng's and Fikile's next steps. Elsewhere, KB faces the music after a rogue decision, and Reece reaches her breaking point.
13	7	"Family Matters"	Travis Taute	Daryne Joshua	24 September 2021
After a string of shake-ups, Fiks receives more news, Puleng reconsiders her love life, and the case takes a shocking turn during a pivotal party.

=== Season 3 (2022) ===
No. overall	No. in season	Title	Directed by	Written by	Original release date
14	1	"Re-Orientation"	Travis Taute	Chinaka Iwunze	25 November 2022
Fiks pays an emotional visit to the Khumalo house and looks for answers with Puleng. The authorities investigate the Molapos. Siya starts at Parkhurst.
15	2	"The Recruit"	Mmabatho Montsho	Chinaka Iwunze	25 November 2022
KB confronts a surprise arrival while Fiks also receives a visitor. At school, a bullying incident gets out of hand. Chris rents a yacht for his 18th.
16	3	"Blind Spot"	Mmabatho Montsho	Nelisa Ngcobo	25 November 2022
Friends and loved ones rally around the Khumalos in the weeks after a terrible tragedy — but Puleng can't shake the feeling that it wasn't an accident.
17	4	"Out of the Shadows"	Thati Pele	Chinaka Iwunze	25 November 2022
After a police raid at a rave, Wade and Fiks take drastic measures as they try to locate missing Puleng. Meanwhile, Chris receives tough news from Wendy.
18	5	"Mayfair"	Thati Pele	Nelisa Ngcobo	25 November 2022
Puleng's situation grows more precarious. With the authorities remaining tight-lipped, Wade and the gang take matters into their own hands.
19	6	"A Tale of Two Sisters"	Nosipho Dumisa-Ngoasheng	Thati Pele, Mmabatho Montsho	25 November 2022
A bloody showdown takes place at the Molapo house and Puleng plots another escape — but will the perpetrators of all this pain ever see justice?

=== Season 4 (2024) ===
No. overall	No. in season	Title	Directed by	Written by	Original release date
20	1	"Beware of Things Buried"	Keitumetse Qhali "Director Ki"	Chinaka Iwunze	1 March 2024
Another year at Parkhurst brings fresh faces and a new threat to Puleng's doorstep. Chris sets himself up as KB's manager after his music goes viral.
21	2	"Tick Tock B****"	Nosipho Dumisa	Tristram Atkins	1 March 2024
KB's music career is derailed by a violent encounter. Puleng enlists Wade in her search for the blackmailer and discovers she isn't the only target.
22	3	"Bad Decisions"	Zenn van Zyl	Meesha Aboo	1 March 2024
Puleng takes matters into her own hands, driving a wedge between her and Fiks. Meanwhile, the annual summer gala provides cover for a daring heist.
23	4	"Just Act Normal"	Nozipho Nkelemba	Tristram Atkins	1 March 2024
An exam-cheating scandal jeopardizes Tahira's future, but others see an opportunity. Puleng puts Fiks in danger as she closes in on the blackmailer.
24	5	"Too Little, Too Late"	Zenn van Zyl	Meesha Aboo	1 March 2024
Fiks is violently confronted with her past while KB and Chris end up in a tough spot of their own. With the truth in hand, Puleng takes drastic action.
25	6	"Proceed With No Expectations"	Keitumetse Qhali "Director Ki"	Chinaka Iwunze	1 March 2024
The gang is drawn into a tense standoff as Puleng and Fiks desperately scramble to save each other and prevent the worst from happening.

== Production ==
=== Development ===
In February 2019, it was announced Netflix had picked up their second South African original production after Queen Sono with a new teen drama from Gambit Films directed by Nosipho Dumisa and written by Daryne Joshua and Travis Taute. Bradley Joshua and Benjamin Overmeyer would produce.

In June 2020, Netflix renewed the series for a second season. The writers' room was expanded for the second season, and Thati Peele was added to the directing team.

On 6 April 2022, it was revealed the third season of the show was under production.

=== Casting ===
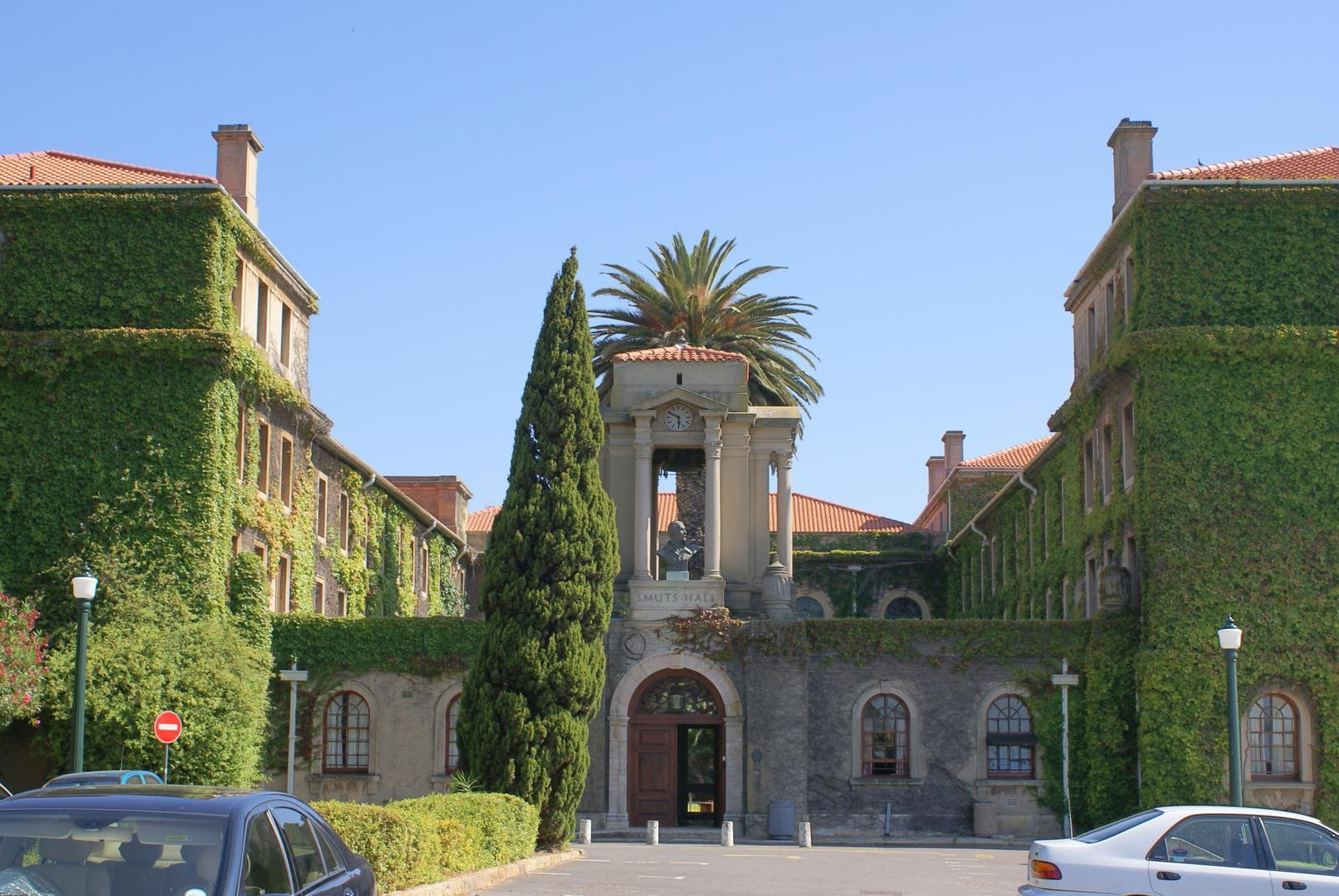
Smuts Hall

The cast was reported when filming for season 1 began, with a line-up of Ama Qamata, Khosi Ngema, Thabang Molaba, Dillon Windvogel, and Natasha Thahane. Gail Mabalane, Sello Maake, Arno Greeff, Ryle De Morny, Getmore Sithole, Xolile Tshabalala, Monique Rockman, and Cindy Mahlangu would also feature. Qamata was connected with the casting director through her work on Gomora.

Leroy Panashe Siyafa, Katishcka Chanderlal, and Alzavia Abrahams joined the cast for season 2 with Greteli Fincham promoted to a more central role.

In February 2024, it was announced Wanda Banda had joined the cast of Blood & Water for its fourth season.

=== Filming ===
Principal photography for the first season began on location in and around Cape Town in June 2019. Parts of the University of Cape Town made up the fictional Parkhurst College, such as Smuts Hall and Sarah Baartman Hall. Other filming locations included Cape Town City Hall, the Bay Hotel in Camps Bay, Sea Point promenade, the Atlantic Seaboard, Durbanville, and Llandudno. The swimming pool scenes were shot at Generations School in Somerset West.

Filming for the second season started 1 November 2020 and ended on 3 March 2021 in Cape Town. By the third season announcement in April 2022, filming had already commenced in Cape Town.

As of June 2023, production on the fourth season was underway. Filming began 12 November 2023 and concluded on 16 January 2024. The season premiered on Netflix 16 March 2024.

== Release ==
A teaser trailer for the first season was released on 11 May 2020 followed by the official trailer on 15 May. All six episodes were available on Netflix from 20 May.

In August 2021, Netflix announced the season 2 release date with a teaser trailer as part of their September 2021 slate. A new official poster was also revealed. Netflix dropped the full trailer on 13 September. The seven episode second season was released on 24 September 2021.

In October 2022, Netflix officially announced that season 3 would be released on 25 October 2022 with a teaser trailer. This was followed by the full trailer on 9 November.

On 5 September 2023, it was revealed season 4 would be released in the first quarter of 2024. On 7 February 2024, Netflix released the trailer and confirmed the season would be released on 1 March 2024.

== Reception ==
=== Critical and audience response ===
For season 1, Rotten Tomatoes reported an approval rating of 80% based on 5 reviews with an average rating of 6.5 out of 10. The series received attention from celebrities such as Gabrielle Union and Lil Nas X.

=== Awards and nominations ===
Year	Award	Category	Recipient(s)	Result	Ref.
2021	South African Film and Television Awards	Best TV Drama	Blood & Water	Won	
2021	South African Film and Television Awards	Best Achievement in Directing — TV Drama	Nosipho Dumisa, Daryne Joshua, Travis Taute	Nominated	
2021	South African Film and Television Awards	Best Achievement in Screenwriting — TV Drama	Nosipho Dumisa, Daryne Joshua, Travis Taute	Nominated	
2021	South African Film and Television Awards	Best Achievement in Cinematography — TV Drama	Zenn van Zyl	Won	
2021	South African Film and Television Awards	Best Achievement in Sound Design — TV Drama	James Olivier, Richard West, Simon Ratcliffe, Jade Hill, Jack van Wyck, Carl Roberts, Michael Broomberg, Tamlyn Taylor, Charles Singleton, David Houston, Jaime Lopes, Craig Ormond	Won	
2021	Séries Brasil Awards	Actress Revelation of the Year	Ama Qamata	Won	
2022	South African Film and Television Awards	Best Supporting Actress in a TV Drama	Xolile Tshabalala	Nominated	
2022	South African Film and Television Awards	Best Achievement in Scriptwriting – TV Drama	Nosipho Dumisa, Travis Taute, Daryne Joshua	Nominated	
2022	South African Film and Television Awards	Best Achievement in Wardrobe – TV Drama	Marne van der Burgh-Blaauw	Nominated	
2022	South African Film and Television Awards	Best Achievement in Art Direction – TV Drama	Christian Joubert	Nominated	
