= Mosili Makuta =

Mosotho actress

- Born: Mosili Makuta; Maseru, Lesotho
- Occupation: Actress
- Years active: 2015–present

Mosili Makuta is a Mosotho actress.

== Career ==
In 2016, she acted in the Mosotho play My Father's Daughter – Qomatse alongside South African legendary actor Jerry Mofokeng. She played the role 'Dipuo'. The play officially launched on 23 May 2016 in Bloemfontein.

In 2017, Makuta acted in the South African film Five Fingers for Marseilles. She played the role as a good police officer. The film received positive reviews and selected for screening at the Toronto International Film Festival (TIFF) from 7 to 17 September 2017.

== Filmography ==
Year	Film	Role	Genre	Ref.
2016	My Father's Daughter – Qomatse	Dipuo	Stage play	
2017	Five Fingers for Marseilles	Good cop	Film	
