= Abigail Kubeka =

South African singer, songwriter and actress

Abigail Kubheka
- Born: Abigail Kubheka; 19 January 1941 (age 85); Orlando East, South Africa
- Other name: Cossie
- Occupations: Singer; songwriter; actress
- Years active: 1957–present

Abigail Kubheka OIS (born 19 January 1941) is a South African singer, songwriter and actress. On the SABC TV series Generations: The Legacy, she plays the role of Zondiwe Mogale, the mother of Tau Mogale (Rapulana Seiphemo) and Tshidi Phakade (Letoya Makhene).

== Personal life ==
Kubeka was born 19 January 1941 in Orlando East. She attended a missionary boarding school in Kilnerton. From a young age, she showed an interest in singing.

== Career ==
Abigail Kubeka started singing with popular musicians such as Miriam Makeba and Hugh Masekela, and has performed with many others, including Thandi Klaasen.

In the 1950s she sang with the South African all-women close harmony group The Skylarks. She traveled to London as a part of the cast of the jazz musical King Kong.

In 2014, Kubeka received a Lifetime Achievement Award from the South African Film and Television Awards (SAFTAS), and in 2016 was honoured with a Lifetime Achievement Award at the Wawela Music Awards (WMA) in Johannesburg. In the early 2000s, Kubeka won the Lifetime Achievement Award for best musician and jazz industrial.

Kubeka has appeared in films including An African American (2016), The Jakes Are Missing (2015), and The Long Run (2001), in which she sang with Busi Mhlongo.

== Filmography ==
=== Filmography ===
Films
Year	Title	Role	Director	Notes #
1969	Knock-Out		Viriato Barreto	
1971	Diary of Thandi	Sis'May	Jacob Ngubeni	
1973	Joe Bullet	Beauty	Louis de Witt	
1987	City of Blood	Maureen	Darrell Roodt	
1990	Last Year's Queen	Unknown	Unknown	
1995	Cry, the Beloved Country	Mrs. Mkize	Darrell Roodt	
2001	The Long Run	Bar Lady	Jean Stewart	
2001	An Activists 2: Long Walk	Madikizela		
2010	Kasi Movies:Elalini	Anele	Anele Jong	
2015	The Jakes Are Missing	Grace	Figjam	
2016	An African American	Wajé Seleste	Nkosi Size	
2017	Morning, Mandela			
2018	What's The Deal	Shantel "Abram's'	Tanit Phoenix	

=== Television ===
TelevisionActress
Year	Title	Episode	Role	Director	Notes #
2005	Holby City	Tuesday's Child	Paulina Griffin		
2007–2011	Wild at Heart	5 episodes over the stated time period.	Cebile/Mrs. Fatani	?	
2014–present	Generations		Zondiwe Mogale		
2020	Queen Sono	Mazet	Main role	Kagiso Lediga and Tebogo Malope	Netflix

== Accolades ==
Kubeka won a Wamela award for lifetime achievement, for the services she has provided for the country, and was also nominated at the Durban Film Festival with Thuso Mbedu, Connie Ferguson, Leleti Khumalo and Sihle Ndaba.

- Wamela Music Awards (Won – Lifetime Achievement Award 2001)
- Durban Film Festival (Nominated – Actress In Supporting Role 2014)
- South African Film and Television Award (Won – Best Actress, The Long Run 2015)
- SAM Awards (Singer of the Year – Nominated 2017)
