= Call Me Thief =

2016 film

- Film poster
- Afrikaans: Noem My Skollie
- Directed by: Daryne Joshua
- Written by: John W. Fredericks
- Starring: Sandi Schultz; Dann-Jacques Mouton
- Music by: Kyle Shepherd
- Release date: 2 September 2016
- Running time: 140 minutes
- Country: South Africa
- Language: Afrikaans
- Box office: $236,923

Call Me Thief (Afrikaans: Noem My Skollie) is a 2016 South African crime film directed by Daryne Joshua. It was selected as the South African entry for the Best Foreign Language Film at the 89th Academy Awards, but it was not nominated. It is based on the life of the film's writer, John W. Fredericks.

== Cast ==
- Dann-Jacques Mouton as Abraham 'AB' Lonzi
- Christian Bennett as Tyrone 'Gif' Felix
- Gantane Kusch as Richard 'Gimba' Carelse
- Gershwin Mias as Martin 'Shorty' Jacobs
- Sandi Schultz as Kettie Lonzi, AB's mother
- Charlton George as Phillip Lonzi, AB's father
- Tarryn Wyngaard as Jenny; AB's love interest
- Lauren Joseph as Gloria Lonzi; AB's younger sister
- Simone Biscombe as Frances Lonzi; AB's older sister
- Denise Newman as Mrs. Lubbe; the Lonzis' next door neighbor
- Abduragman Adams as Mr. Carelse; Gimba's father, leader of the 26's gang
- Jill Levenberg as Celia; Gif's aunt
- Louw Venter as Officer Koegedam

== See also ==
- List of submissions to the 89th Academy Awards for Best Foreign Language Film
- List of South African submissions for the Academy Award for Best Foreign Language Film
