= Mangaliso =

Mangaliso is a masculine given name found in South Africa. Notable people with this name include:

- Mangaliso Matika, a South African politician
- Mangaliso Mosehle (born 1990), a South African cricket player
- Mangaliso Mtiya, another South African cricket player
- Mangaliso Ndlovu (born 1980), a South African parliamentarian and minister
- Mangaliso Ngema, a South African actor
