= Rosemary Zimu =

South African actress

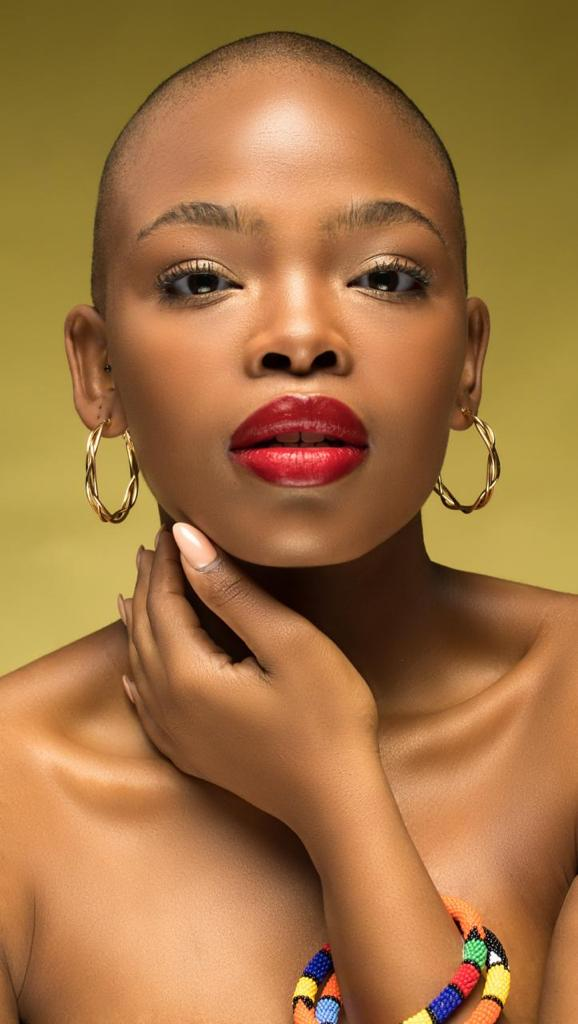
- Zimu in 2021
- Born: 15 April 1993 (age 33)
- Education: St. Andrew's School for Girls
- Alma mater: Technikon Natal
- Occupation: Actress
- Known for: Playing Lucy Juice on Scandal!
- Television: Scandal!
- Spouse: Nkosinathi Mnguni

Rosemary Zimu-Mnguni (née Zimu; born 15 April 1993) is a South African actress, singer, and songwriter. She is best known for her roles in motion pictures like Isidingo, Savage Beauty, Shadow (2017), Champagne (2015), and Scandal!.

In May 2022, Zimu made her appearance in Netflix's series Savage Beauty, alongside Nthati Moshesh and Jesse Suntele.

== Career ==
Since her childhood, she had an interest in theater, singing, and acting. But in 2014 Rosemary started her career with South African (Nollywood) film Champagne at the age of 21. In 2017 she landed in Mzansi Magic's Wena Wena, Same year she also featured in the first South African Netflix series Shadow.

After that, she was featured in various South African soap operas like Ilangatje (2018), Insidingo (2018–2019), Generations (2019–2020), and Scandal!. In 2022 she got a major role in Netflix's Savage Beauty, where she played the role of Zinhle. In 2023 she appeared in a series named Nine. She is set to make an appearance in the upcoming season of Savage Beauty.

== Filmography ==
=== Film ===
- Champagne

=== Television ===
- Savage Beauty
- Shadow
- Isidingo
- Generations
- Scandal!
- Ayeye: Stripped
- My Brother's keeper
- Strings attached

== Personal life ==
Rosemary was born and brought up in Johannesburg, South Africa in a joint family of seven children. She was raised by her mother Blessings Zimu along with her 6 siblings Dj Themba (brother), and Zanele Zimu (sister). After High School, she earned a Certification in labor law and became a lawyer.

== Awards and nominations ==
List of Accolades
| Award / Film Festival | Year | Recipient | Project | Nomination | Result | Ref. |
|---|---|---|---|---|---|---|
| South African Film and Television Awards | 2023 | Herself | Savage Beauty (Quizzical Pictures and Netflix) | Golden Horn for Best Actress in a TV Drama | Nominated | |
