= Jacques Engelbrecht =

South African rugby union player (born 1985)

- Full name: Jacques Jacobus Engelbrecht
- Born: 10 June 1985 (age 41) Bellville, South Africa
- Height: 1.93 m (6 ft 4 in)
- Weight: 112 kg (247 lb; 17 st 9 lb)
- School: Monument Park High School, Kraaifontein

Rugby union career
- Position: Flanker / No 8
- Current team: Sporting Club Albigeois
Youth career
- 2005: Boland Cavaliers
Senior career
Years	Team	Apps	(Points)
2007–2008	Western Province	2	(0)
2008–2010	SWD Eagles	48	(15)
2011	Eastern Province Kings	24	(25)
2013	Southern Kings	17	(5)
2013–2015	Blue Bulls	21	(0)
2014	Bulls	13	(0)
2015–2016	Eastern Province Kings	11	(0)
2016	Southern Kings	10	(0)
2016	Boland Cavaliers	7	(5)
2016–2020	Montauban	78	(25)
2020–2021	Association Sportive Mâconnaise	4	(0)
2021–Present	Sporting Club Albigeois	10	(10)
- Correct as of 9 September 2021
International career
Years	Team	Apps	(Points)
2010–2011	South Africa Sevens		
2011	South African Kings	2	(0)
2012	South African Barbarians (South)	1	(5)
- Correct as of 9 September 2021

Jacques Jacobus "Vleis" Engelbrecht (born 10 June 1985) is a South African professional rugby union player, currently playing in France with French Pro D2 side Montauban. He can play as a flanker or a number eight.

== Career ==
=== Youth / amateur rugby / Western Province ===
Engelbrecht played high school rugby for Monument Park High School, where he played as a flanker for their first team in 2002 and 2003. He represented Boland U21 in the 2005 Under-21 Provincial Championship and played club rugby for Hamiltons in the Western Province Super League. He was one of a number of club players that trained with Western Province squad during their 2007 Currie Cup Premier Division campaign and he got an opportunity to make one appearance for them, coming on as a replacement in their final match of the regular season to make his first class debut in a 37–7 victory over Griquas. He made one more appearance for them the following season, starting their 2008 Vodacom Cup semi-final match against the Free State Cheetahs, where they suffered a 22–27 defeat.

=== SWD Eagles ===
Engelbrecht moved to George prior to the 2008 Currie Cup First Division to join the SWD Eagles. He made three starts and five appearances off the bench in the competition as the Eagles finished third on the log to qualify for the semi-finals. One of Engelbrecht's starts was in their semi-final match against the Griffons, but he ended the match on the losing side, with the team from Welkom – and eventual champions – running out 27–17 winners.

Engelbrecht started the 2009 Vodacom Cup playing as a winger for the SWD Eagles in their 43–20 victory over the Mighty Elephants in Uniondale, but reverted to his more accustomed loose-forward role for the remainder of the campaign, making a total of six appearances as the side finished in second spot on the Southern Section log before losing to the Leopards in the quarter finals of the competition. Engelbrecht featured in a compulsory friendly match against the Free State Cheetahs before making ten appearances in the 2009 Currie Cup First Division. The SWD Eagles finished the round-robin stage of the competition in second position on the log to qualify for the semi-finals. Engelbrecht started their 31–18 victory over the Griffons in the semi-final and also in the final, where he ended on the losing side, with Mpumalanga-based side the Pumas winning the title by beating them 47–19. As runners-up, the SWD Eagles still qualified for the promotion play-offs and Engelbrecht started both matches against the Leopards. They lost 42–47 in the first leg in Potchefstroom and an 18–17 victory in the second leg was not enough to get the SWD Eagles promoted.

By 2010, Engelbrecht had established himself as a first-team regular and started six of their seven matches in the 2010 Vodacom Cup, but his side had a poor season compared to 2009 and failed to qualify for the quarter finals, winning just two of their matches in the competition. He played in a compulsory friendly match against Griquas in Oudtshoorn and featured in all ten matches during the regular season of the 2010 Currie Cup First Division, starting nine of those. Engelbrecht scored the first points of his career, getting the first of the SWD Eagles' eight tries in their 55–47 victory over the Falcons in Kempton Park, although this occasion was spoiled by Engelbrecht also getting sin-binned for the final few minutes of the match. The SWD Eagles had a far more successful season than their Vodacom Cup campaign and finished top of the log to qualify for the semi-finals with home advantage. Engelbrecht scored the second try of his career in the SWD Eagles' 32–30 victory over the Griffons in their semi-final and also started the final, where his side fell just short, losing 12–16 to the Eastern Province Kings. In addition to losing in the final for the second consecutive year, the SWD Eagles also failed to win promotion for the season year in a row. They once again faced the Leopards in the promotion play-offs, but could not overcome a 22–37 defeat in the first leg, with a 32–28 victory in the second leg proving to not be enough.

His performances during the course of the season led to him being nominated as the First Division Player of the Season, although the award was eventually won by Eastern Province Kings winger Norman Nelson.

=== South African Sevens ===
Shortly after the Currie Cup season finished, Engelbrecht was included in the South Africa Sevens squad that played in the 2010 South Africa Sevens tournament, where they won the Plate tournament. This turned out to be his only selection in the Blitzbokke squad.

=== Eastern Province Kings / Kings ===
For the 2011 season, and after a short trial period at the Sharks, Engelbrecht moved to the Eastern Cape to join the Eastern Province Kings. He started in three matches for them during the 2011 Vodacom Cup competition and scored two tries in their 26–16 victory over Griquas. The Eastern Province Kings won six of their eight matches in the competition, but missed out on a quarter final spot after they were deducted nine points for fielding ineligible players in their matches.

In June 2011, Engelbrecht was included in a South African Kings side that participated at the 2011 IRB Nations Cup in Romania. The South African Kings was the name used by the Southern Kings franchise, as part of their preparations for their inclusion into Super Rugby in 2013. Engelbrecht started their first two matches as the Kings beat Georgia 31–17 and hosts Romania 27–23. He missed out on their 39–12 victory over Portugal in their final match to win the sixth edition of the competition.

Engelbrecht featured in a compulsory friendly match against the Free State Cheetahs before making nine appearances in the 2011 Currie Cup First Division. The Eastern Province Kings won nine out of their ten matches in the competition to qualify for a semi-final match against the Falcons. They ran out 48–17 winners in the semi-final with Engelbrecht scoring a first-half try. He also played in the final, but ended on the losing side for the third year in succession, as Wellington-based outfit Boland Cavaliers ran out 43–12 winners.

Engelbrecht started all of the Eastern Province Kings' eight matches during the 2012 Vodacom Cup and scored tries in their matches against defending champions Pampas XV and against a Free State XV as they finished third in the Southern Section to qualify for the quarter finals. He played in their quarter final match against the Pumas, which the side from Nelspruit won 30–19. Prior to the 2012 Currie Cup First Division, Engelbrecht featured in two more first class matches; the first was a match for a South African Barbarians (South) side against England during their 2012 tour of South Africa which saw Engelbrecht score the opening try in a 26–54 defeat for the Barbarians, while his second match was for the Eastern Province Kings in a 36–19 victory against a South African Students side.

Engelbrecht made appearances for the Kings in their matches against the Boland Cavaliers and SWD Eagles in the 2012 Currie Cup First Division, but missed the remainder of the season after he had to undergo an operation to remove ulcers from his colon. In his absence, the Eastern Province Kings went on to clinch the First Division title, beating the Pumas 26–25 in the final. They failed to gain promotion to the 2013 Currie Cup Premier Division, however, losing both their promotion play-off matches against the Free State Cheetahs, losing 14–53 in Bloemfontein and 6–16 in Port Elizabeth to remain in the First Division.

Engelbrecht returned to action in 2013, when he was named in the Southern Kings squad for the 2013 Super Rugby season. He made his Super Rugby debut in the Kings' first ever match in the competition, coming on as a first half replacement as the Kings ran out 22–10 winners against Australian side the Force. He made his first Super Rugby start two weeks later when the Kings hosted the Sharks and scored his first try in Super Rugby the following week, in a 24–35 defeat to the Chiefs in Hamilton. He eventually made fifteen appearances in the competition – ten starts and five appearances off the bench – during the competition as the Kings finished last on the log. That meant they had to play in a relegation play-off series against the Lions and Engelbrecht started both legs of the play-offs; a 26–19 win for the Lions in the first leg and a 23–18 win for the Kings in the second leg meant that the Lions regained their Super Rugby status at the expense of the Kings by virtue of having a better points difference.

=== Blue Bulls / Bulls ===
After the 2013 Super Rugby season, Engelbrecht moved to Pretoria to join the Blue Bulls, signing a contract until October 2016. He made eight appearances for the Blue Bulls during the 2013 Currie Cup Premier Division – the first time he played in the Premier Division of the Currie Cup since his 2007 cameo appearance for Western Province – as they finished in fifth spot to miss out on the title play-offs.

Engelbrecht was included in the Bulls squad for the 2014 Super Rugby season and made his debut in a 31–16 defeat to the Sharks in Durban. He made his first Super Rugby start for the Bulls the following week in a 9–15 defeat to the Cheetahs in Bloemfontein and eventually made thirteen appearances in the competition for a Bulls side that finished second in the South African Conference, but failed to qualify for the finals. He also made a single appearance for the Blue Bulls in the 2014 Vodacom Cup.

Engelbrecht made one start (against the Golden Lions) and five substitute appearances during the 2014 Currie Cup Premier Division as the Blue Bulls finished in fourth spot on the log before losing to Western Province in the semi-finals.

Despite being named in the Bulls squad for the 2015 Super Rugby season, Engelbrecht failed to make any appearances in the competition, instead making six starts for the Blue Bulls in the 2015 Vodacom Cup competition.

=== Eastern Province Kings (loan) ===
Prior to the 2015 Currie Cup Premier Division, the Blue Bulls announced that Engelbrecht would return to the Eastern Province Kings on loan for the duration of the tournament. Engelbrecht came on as a replacement in matches against the Golden Lions and the Sharks and started their match against the Pumas, but then suffered a hip pointer which ruled him out of action for two rounds. He made one appearance as a replacement and three starts in the remainder of the competition, helping the Eastern Province Kings improve on their 2014 record by winning two matches to finish in seventh position in the eight-team league.

=== Southern Kings (2016) ===
In January 2016, it was announced that Engelbrecht would return to the Southern Kings for their re-entry into the Super Rugby competition in 2016. He started their first four matches of the season in the number eight shirt, but lost his starting place to Aidon Davis who returned from an injury lay-off. After one more appearance as a replacement against the Lions, he dropped out of the squad altogether and was lent to the Eastern Province Kings for the 2016 Currie Cup qualification series, a competition in which Engelbrecht made four appearances. He returned to the Super Rugby squad, making another four appearances as a replacement and started their final match of the competition, a 24–52 defeat to the Stormers. In total, he made five starts and five appearances as a replacement during the season, without scoring a try in a season that saw the Kings finish bottom of the South African Group and second-last overall, winning just two matches.

=== Montauban ===
After the 2016 Currie Cup Premier Division season, Engelbrecht moved to France, joining Pro D2 side Montauban on a two-year contract.

=== Sporting Club Albigeois ===
After briefly appearing in four matches for French side Mâcon in 2020, Engelbrecht signed for Championnat Fédéral Nationale side Sporting Club Albigeois in February 2021

== Statistics ==
First class career
Season	International			Main domestic			Other			Total	
Season	Team	Apps	Pts	Team	Apps	Pts	Team	Apps	Pts	Apps	Pts
2007	—			Western Province (CC)	1	0	—			1	0
2008	—			SWD Eagles (CC1)	8	0	Western Province (VC)	1	0	9	0
2009	—			SWD Eagles (CC1 / CCPO)	12	0	SWD Eagles (VC)	6	0	19	0
2009	—			SWD Eagles (CC1 / CCPO)	12	0	SWD Eagles (fr)	1	0	19	0
2010	—			SWD Eagles (CC1 / CCPO)	14	15	SWD Eagles (VC)	6	0	21	15
2010	—			SWD Eagles (CC1 / CCPO)	14	15	SWD Eagles (fr)	1	0	21	15
2011	South African Kings (NC)	2	0	Eastern Province Kings (CC1)	9	5	Eastern Province Kings (VC)	3	10	15	15
2011	South African Kings (NC)	2	0	Eastern Province Kings (CC1)	9	5	Eastern Province Kings (fr)	1	0	15	15
2012	South African Barbarians (IT)	1	5	Eastern Province Kings (CC1)	2	0	Eastern Province Kings (VC)	8	10	12	15
2012	South African Barbarians (IT)	1	5	Eastern Province Kings (CC1)	2	0	Eastern Province Kings (fr)	1	0	12	15
2013	Kings (SR)	15	5	Blue Bulls (CC)	8	0	Kings (SRPO)	2	0	25	5
2014	Bulls (SR)	13	0	Blue Bulls (CC)	6	0	Blue Bulls (VC)	1	0	20	0
2015	—			Eastern Province Kings (CC)	7	0	Blue Bulls (VC)	6	0	13	0
2016	Kings (SR)	10	0	Boland Cavaliers (CC)	7	5	Eastern Province Kings (CCQ)	4	0	21	5
2016–present	—			Montauban (D2)	6	0	—			6	0
2007–present	Updated 12 January 2017									155	30
Competition abbreviations: NC = IRB Nations Cup, IT = Incoming Tours, SR = Super Rugby, SRPO = Super Rugby promotion/relegation play-off, CC = Currie Cup Premier Division, CC1 = Currie Cup First Division, CCPO = Currie Cup promotion/relegation play-off, CCQ = Currie Cup qualification, VC = Vodacom Cup, D2 = Pro D2, fr = friendly.
