= Irene Grootboom =

South African housing rights activist

- Born: c. 1969
- Died: 2008; Wallacedene, Kraaifontein, South Africa
- Known for: Housing activist who won a court case about the constitutional right to adequate housing, and died penniless in a shack

Irene Grootboom (c. 1969 – 2008) was a South African housing rights activist best known for her victory before the Constitutional Court in 2000. The Court found that the government had not met its obligation to provide adequate alternative housing for the residents of Kraaifontein’s Wallacedene informal settlement. The ruling provided clear legal support for housing-rights campaigns in South Africa and elsewhere. At the time of her death in August 2008, however, Grootboom was still living in a shack.

The SJC grassroots movement in Khayelitsha established the Irene Grootboom Memorial Lecture Series in her honour.
