= Kyle Shepherd =

South African composer (born 1987)

Kyle Shepherd Kyle Shepherd
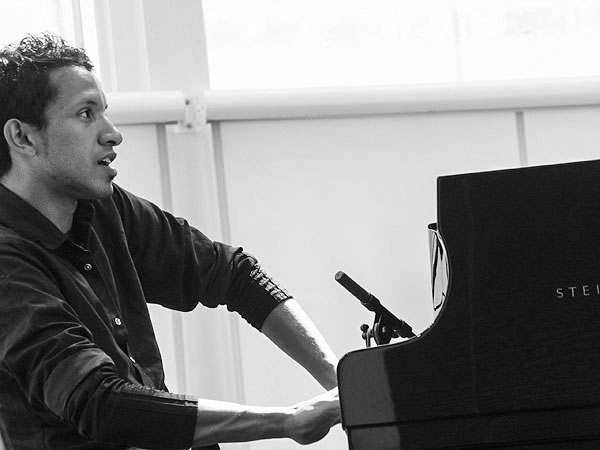
- Kyle Shepherd, Johannesburg 2026

Background information
- Born: 8 July 1987 (age 39); Cape Town, South Africa
- Genres: Jazz; film music; classical
- Occupations: film composer; pianist; performer
- Instruments: Piano; Saxophone; Xaru; singing; composition
- Website: Official website

Kyle Shepherd (born 8 July 1987 in Cape Town) is a South African film, TV and theatre music composer and an accomplished touring jazz pianist. As a film composer he has scored Netflix hit TV series Unseen, Savage Beauty, and Blood and Water. As a performing pianist he has released seven albums and performed in 41 countries around the world in venues such as Carnegie Hall, Théâtre du Châtelet, The Barbican, and the Sydney Opera House.

== Life and work ==
Kyle Shepherd is one of South Africa's leading jazz film and theatre music composers and pianists. He was the Standard Bank Young Artist of the Year for Jazz in 2014 and the UNISA (University of South Africa) piano competition winner (Jazz category) in 2015. He has performed in 32 countries around the world, including 11 concert tours in Japan.

His body of work comprises seven jazz albums (as of October 2024) and numerous scores for film, television and theatre. His television credits include the Netflix series Unseen, (season 1); Blood and Water (season 2); Savage Beauty (season 1) and Surviving Paradise.

Shepherd's film credits include Indemnity (2021); Barakat (2020), South Africa's official entry to the 2022 Academy Awards and winner for Best Score at the 2022 Silwerskerm Film Festival; Fiela se Kind (2019) also winner for Best Score at the 2020 Silwerskerm Film Festival; Vlugtig (2021); and Noem My Skollie (Call Me Thief), South Africa's official entry to the 2017 Academy Awards.

He was awarded the 2018 South African Humanities and Social Sciences (HSS) Award: Book, Creative Collection and Digital Contribution. The award was for Best Musical Composition for his score for Noem My Skollie.

Shepherd is also the co-creator of the hit Afrikaans musical television show, Koortjies with Cape Town jazz and gospel music star Jonathan Rubain.

In addition to his SAFTA, SAMA, and Silwerskerm nominations, Shepherd was nominated for a Fleur du Cap Theater Award in 2023 for his score in Lara Foot's award-winning Life & Times of Michael K. The production is based on the Nobel prize-winning novel by J.M Coetzee and won the 2023 Fleur du Cap award for Best Theatre Production.

In February 2023, Shepherd completed a series of performances of Waiting for the Sibyl at the Théâtre du Châtelet in Paris and went on to perform the chamber opera at other international venues. Waiting for the Sibyl was created in collaboration with the South African visual artist William Kentridge and co-composer Nhlanhla Mhlangu. The opera won the UK's Laurence Olivier Theatre Award for Best New Opera Production in 2023.

Shepherd received a Masters degree (Cum Laude) in Music from Stellenbosch University in 2018 with a scholarship from York University (UK) in collaboration with Stellenbosch's Africa Open Institute for Music, Research and Innovation (AOI).

== Prizes and awards ==
In 2014 he won the Standard Bank Young Artist Award for the genre Jazz. Silwerskerm Film Festival awards for his feature film scores Fiela se kind and Barakat. And an Olivier theatre award for "Waiting for the Sibyl", a co-creation with William Kentridge and Nhlahla Mahlangu. Humanities and social sciences award for his film score Noem my Skollie.

== Discography ==
=== Albums ===
- fineArt (Sheer Sound 2009, with Buddy Wells, Dylan Tabisher, Claude Cozens)
- A Portrait of Home (Sheer Sound 2010, with Shane Cooper, Jonno Sweetman)
- South African History! X (Sheer Sound 2012)
- Dream State (Sheer Sound 2014, with Shane Cooper, Jonno Sweetman and Buddy Wells)
- Kyle Shepherd, Lionel Loueke, Sound Portraits from Contemporary Africa (Jazzhaus 2017, with Mthunzi Mvubu, Shane Cooper, Jonno Sweetman)
- Into Darkness (2014). Solo in Japan
- After the Night, The Day will Surely Come. (2021) Solo Piano
- A Dance More Sweetly Played (2024, Matsuli Music), with Shane Cooper, Jonno Sweetman as the Kyle Shepherd Trio.
