= Champagne (2014 film) =

2014 film by Emem Isong

- Theatrical release poster
- Directed by: Emem Isong
- Written by: Uduak Oguamanam; Anthony Kehinde Joseph
- Screenplay by: Emem Isong
- Produced by: Emem Isong
- Starring: Majid Michel; Mbong Amata; Alexx Ekubo; Susan Peters; Tana Adelana; Rosemary Zimu; Kokotso Charlotte
- Cinematography: Tom Robson; Beanca Van Heerden; James Costello (uncredited)
- Edited by: Daniel Tom
- Production company: Royal Arts Studios
- Distributed by: Royal Arts Academy; Silverbird Film Distributions
- Release date: 19 December 2014
- Country: Nigeria
- Language: English
- Budget: ₦25 million

Champagne is a 2014 Nigerian romantic thriller film, produced and directed by Emem Isong. It stars Majid Michel, Alexx Ekubo, Mbong Amata, Susan Peters, Tana Adelana, Koketso Motlhabane Charlotte, and introduces Rosemary Zimu as Champagne. This is Emem Isong's first film as a director.

The film tells the story of a young couple (Alex Ekubo and Rosemary Zimu), who are in an "open marriage"; To meet their financial needs as a family, they often date unsuspecting people, scam them, and run away. They eventually meet Mr. Douglas (Majid Michel), who takes them on an unexpected ride.

== Cast ==
- Alexx Ekubo as Tare Hopewell
- Rosemary Zimu as Champagne
- Majid Michel as Mr. Douglas
- Mbong Amata as
- Susan Peters as
- Tana Adelana as
- Koketso Motlhabane Charlotte as Danielle
- Padita Agu as
- Anita Chris as

== Production ==
On the title of the film "Champagne", Isong states: "I just wanted to do something that is a bit associated with glitz and glamour, so I decided to name the lead character 'Champagne'. There's really nothing more to it". The film was shot in Johannesburg, South Africa and Houston, Texas in the United States. Shooting in South Africa in particular, posed a challenge, as the Isong had never really worked in the country before now. Champagne is Emem Isong's first film as a director; in an interview, she stated that she wanted to celebrate her 20 years anniversary in the film industry with Champagne.

== Release ==
The theatrical trailer of Champagne was released on 19 November 2014. The film premiered in Lagos on 19 December 2014 and started showing at the cinemas on the same day. It premiered in the United Kingdom in March 2015.

== Critical reception ==
The film so far has received negative critical reviews, Rosemary Zimu's performance has however been commended by most critics. Nollywood Reinvented rated the film 46%, concluding: "Alexx Ekubo and Rosemary Zimu played off each other’s strength and were able to hold the movie together in their scenes. Alexx is constantly improving as an actor and Rosemary does pretty well for a new actress even though they both could have definitely explored deeper into the emotions". Oris Aigbokhaevbolo of True Nollywood Stories gave a negative review, commenting: "An exploration of that tension between marital duties and financial necessities could take up the duration of a movie, but not with this attention-deficit fare. An unconvincing thriller in romance, near-comic clothing, and it seems no one told the actors. Save for South African newcomer Rosemary Zimu, the actors look unprepared for the film’s turning point moment. Emem Isong’s Champagne Fails To Pop". Samod Biobaku panned the film and performances from the actors (except for Zimu's performance), commenting: "In this movie, Emem Isong clearly struggles with creative consistency. From the lighting to the shallow dialogues and this rolls into a plot, so loose, it eventually becomes painfully disjointed. Midway into the movie, the feeling that you could walk out of the cinema hall and ask a friend to tell you what happened afterwards proved a realistic option. The story grips the highway of a saccharine-littered storyline that falls, stumbles, trips, takes flight, trips again, breaks down and somehow, manages to hurl its bulky frame across the finish-line where conflicts are ultimately resolved".

== See also ==
- List of Nigerian films of 2014
