= Padita Agu =

Nollywood actress and Vlogger

- Born: 13 October 1980 (age 45); Lagos, Nigeria
- Citizenship: Nigerian
- Education: University of Abuja
- Occupations: Film actress, Vlogger
- Years active: 2015 - Present
- Children: 1

Padita Agu is a Nigerian actress who produced the film, My name is not Olosho and became known with film, Last Three digits, She owns a YouTube channel where she shares experiences and lessons about relationship with women.

== Career ==
She produced the film My name is not Olosho in which she is also the lead actress starring Demola Adedoyin, Segun Arinze, and Rachel Oniga, directed by Theo Ukpaa. The Nollywood actress paused for a while in 2005 to study but returned to the film industry as a lead cast in Last three digit, a comic movie directed by Moses Inwang in 2012.

== Personal life ==
Young Padita was raped at 15 by armed robbers and this gave her trauma which she was able to overcome afterward.

The Nollywood actress' marriage crumbled after she discover there was no love and relationship in the first place. Narrating her ordeals to fans, she met him at a friend's place, and they got married the first day they met.

== Filmography ==
- Final Whistle (2000) as Grace
- Formidable Force (2002) as Chioma
- My Faithful Friend (2003)
- Unbreakable (2004) as Nkolika ( as Padita Ada Agu)
- Egg of life (2003) as Nkem
- Beyond the song (2003)
- Into Temptation (2004)
- Beautiful Faces (2004)
- Burning Heart (2004)
- Shackles Of Death (2005)
- Without Apology (2006)
- Champagne (2014)
- Just A Maid (2014)
- The Last three digit (2015) as Audrey
- Single ladies (2017) as Maimuna
- Chasing Rainbows (2017) as Ms Cleo
- Power of 1 (2018) as Arinola
- Love, Sex, Religion (2018) as Ace's Boss
- Being Annabel (2019) as Temi
- Cold feet (2020) as Bolanle
- My Name is not Olosho
- The Call Girl (2021)
- Lost conscience (2021)
- The Marriage Fixer (2022) as Jenny
- Strained (2023) as Maria

== See also ==
- Ini Dima-Okojie
- Linda Osifo
- Cynthia Shalom
