= Getmore Sithole =

South African actor

- Born: Getmore Sithole; 3 June 1964 (age 62); Zimbabwe
- Occupation: Actor
- Years active: 2000–present
- Spouse: Dorriane (m. 2002)
- Website: http://getmoresithole.co.za/index.php/about/

Getmore Sithole (born 4 June 1964) is a Zimbabwe-born South African actor. He is best known for his roles in the popular serials A Small Town Called Descent, Le lion and Blood & Water.

== Personal life ==
He was born on 3 June 1964 in Zimbabwe. He is married to Dorriane, a fashion designer since 2002. They together run the business company 'Sandton Elite Apartments'.

== Career ==
He made his acting debut in 2000 with a recurring role on the television serial Generations. Then in 2002, he acted in another soapie Backstage as tough detective 'Dikobo'. In 2004, he made a supporting role of 'Detective Ditini' in the police procedural television series Jozi Streets. During this period, he played the role 'Advocate Maponya' on the popular soap opera Rhythm City. In 2003, he made his film debut with French feature Le Lion.

In 2005, he joined the cast of e.tv soapie, Scandal!. In the serial, he played the role 'Cain Gumede', and the show became highly popular. He continued to make acting appearance another soap opera The Wild and played the role incorruptible 'Joseph Sithole'. In 2014, he was nominated in Moneygram's Zimbabwe Achievers Awards in the category of Personality of the Year Award. In 2015, he recurred as 'Bab' Shezi' for two seasons on the soapie Ashes to Ashes in which he played until end of 2016. After the serial Ashes to Ashes, he made supportive roles for several South African television serials such as, Intersexions, Wild at Heart, 4Play: Sex Tips for Girls, Jozi-H, Diamond City, Sokhulu & Partners, 90 Plein Street and The Docket.

In late 2019, he joined the cast of Netflix original coming-of-age drama series Blood & Water, which made his first international appearance. The series debuted in 190 countries on 20 May 2020 and later received critical acclaim.

Apart from acting, he also worked as a voice artist notably on MTN's official voice for the 2010 FIFA World Cup Finals in South Africa and the MTN official voice in Africa and parts of the Middle East from 2009 to 2015. Other than television, he acted in feature films including: Mrs Mandela, Free Willy: Escape from Pirate's Cove, Clarissa's Secret, An Act of Defiance, The Last Victims, Blood & Oil and A Covert Affair.

== Filmography ==
Year	Film	Role	Genre	Ref.
2003	Le lion	Bogo	TV movie	
2005	Scandal!	Cain Gumede / Daniel Nyathi	TV series	
2010	Mrs Mandela	Nelson's Aide	TV movie	
2010	Free Willy: Escape from Pirate's Cove	Uncle Rudy	TV series	
2010	A Small Town Called Descent	Charles Mtawarira	Film	
2012	Wild at Heart	Boardmember 1	TV series	
2012	Clarissa's Secret	Djabo	TV movie	
2017	An Act of Defiance	Govan Mbeki	Film	
2018	Liberty	D'Souza	TV mini-series	
2019	The Last Victims	Lwazi's Father	Film	
2020	Blood & Water	Julius Khumalo	TV series	
