= Meet the Khumalos =

2025 South africa film

- Directed by: Jayan Moodley
- Written by: Wendy Gumede; Gillian Breslin
- Produced by: Indhrannie Pillay
- Starring: Ayanda Borotho; Bonga Dlamini; Nandipa Khubone; Connie Chiume; Khosi Ngema; Khanyi Mbau; J-Flo
- Cinematography: Gavin Sterley
- Edited by: Tamara Tengende
- Music by: Chris Letcher
- Production company: Urban Vision Productions
- Distributed by: Netflix
- Release date: 11 April 2025
- Running time: 92 minutes
- Country: South Africa
- Languages: English; Zulu

Meet the Khumalos is a 2025 South African romantic comedy film directed by Jayan Moodley and produced by Urban Vision Productions. It premiered on Netflix on 11 April 2025. The film stars Khanyi Mbau, Ayanda Borotho, Jesse Suntele, and Connie Chiume, among others.

== Plot ==
Grace Khumalo is a successful and flashy woman living in Durban with her husband, a doctor, and son named Sizwe. Her apparently stable life takes a turn for the worse with the arrival of her ex-best friend and now rival, Bongi Sithole, who settles down in their area along with her family. Grace and Bongi share a stormy past filled with conflict, but the exact reason for their bad blood is not disclosed at the beginning of the movie. The problem arises when it comes to light that their respective children are dating each other. Not too happy about their relationship, Grace and Bongi go out of their way to split them up, resulting in a conflict between them in the area by mutual misunderstanding and funny encounters.

Everything comes to a boil during a community event during which their long-standing grievances are cleared. In particular, the mother-in-law of Grace apologizes for her behavior, and the men, who stay on good terms, tell their wives to get over their differences. Grace and Bongi begin to make up, and the movie ends in the humorous attempt of Grace to eat the sheep's head, referring to their common culture.

== Cast ==
- Khanyi Mbau as Grace Khumalo
- Ayanda Borotho as Bongi Sithole
- Jesse Suntele as Sizwe Khumalo
- Khosi Ngema as Sphe Sithole
- Alizwa Sikhafungana as Lu Sithole
- Bonga Dlamini as Vusi Khumalo
- Siyabonga Shibe as Desmond Sithole
- Connie Chiume as Mavis, Grace's mother-in-law

== Production ==
The film was directed by Jayan Moodley and produced by Urban Vision Productions. The film is a remake of Moodley's 2017 film Meet the Kandasamys. It stars Khanyi Mbau as Grace Khumalo and Ayanda Borotho as her rival Bongi Sithole. The main lead actors of the story are Jesse Suntele and Khosi Ngema who play the role of the central couple of the movie. It also stars Connie Chiume who plays the role of Mavis, the mother-in-law of Grace.

Filming took place in locations around Durban, including Umhlanga and KwaMashu. Director Jayan Moodley said the film showcases different parts of the city, including its gated estates and taxi ranks.

== Release and reception ==
Meet the Khumalos premiered on Netflix on 11 April 2025 as a Netflix original film.

Ruchika Bhat of DMTalkies described the film as "a tight 1 hour and 30 minutes of entertainment from start to finish," praising it as a family-friendly comedy that highlights South African talent. Likewise, Ritesh Sharma of Moviedelic commented that the film "portrays everyday life in South Africa with humor and warmth," offering a narrative that balances comedy with emotional depth.
