= Vuyo Dabula =

South African actor

- Born: 11 September 1976 (age 50); Mahikeng, South Africa
- Status: Married
- Education: Witz Technikon
- Occupations: Actor, model
- Years active: 2003–present
- Notable work: Generations: The Legacy
- Children: 1

Vuyo Dabula (born 11 September 1976) is a South African model, actor and bodybuilder. He is best known for his role as Shandu Magwaza in the Netflix crime drama, Queen Sono.

== Early life ==
He studied at P.H Moeketsi Agricultural High where he matriculated in 1995, followed by Wits Technikon, where he graduated after a year in 1996. He claimed what he studied in school was not something he was interested in making his career for the future; instead he started acting. For acting, he studied at AFDA Cape Town.

== Career ==
He is most famous for his role of Kumkani Phakade in the South African soap opera, Generations. Vuyo also appeared in Avengers: Age of Ultron (2015) and he played the main role in the 2017 film Five Fingers for Marseilles. Vuyo starred as Shandu, a spy turned rebel as well as a love interest to Pearl Thusi's character in Netflix's first African original series, Queen Sono. In April 2020, the series was renewed by Netflix for a second season. However, on 26 November 2020, it was reported that Netflix has cancelled the series because of the production challenges brought on by the COVID-19 pandemic.

== Filmography ==
=== Film ===
Year	Title	Role	Notes
2005	Soldiers Of The Rock	Vuyo	
2009	Invictus	Presidential Guard	
2013	Mandela: Long Walk to Freedom	World Trade Centre Delegate	
2015	Avengers: Age of Ultron	Johannesburg Cop	
2017	Five Fingers for Marseilles	Tau	
2022	Collision	Bra Sol	

=== Television ===
Year	Title	Role
2011	Wild at Heart	Kane
2014	Kowethu	Mothusi
2014–present	Generations: The Legacy	Kumkani "Gaddafi" Phakade
2020	Queen Sono	Shandu Magwaza
2023	Unseen	Maxwell Mwale
2023	Uzalo	Bentley Majozi
2020-2023	The Legacy	Siya Nkosi
