= Egg of Life =

- Directed by: Andy Amenechi
- Written by: Kabat Esosa Egbon, Ojiofor Ezeanyaeche
- Release date: 2003
- Country: Nigeria
- Language: English

Egg of Life is a 2003 Nigerian film about healing a prince on the verge of death. It was directed by Andy Amenechi and written by Kabat Esosa Egbon & Ojiofor Ezeanyaeche.

== Cast ==
- Padita Agu as Nkem
- Sam Ajah as Madu
- Funke Akindele as Isioma
- Ozo Akubueze as Ichie Arinze
- Gazza Anderson as Segbeilo
- Nina Bob-Chudey as Obiageli
- Clarion Chukwura as Priestess
- Pete Edochie as Igwe
- Fidelis Ezenwa as Ogbuefi Nwabuzor
- Ifeanyi Ezeokeke as Ikemefuna Snr
- Nnadi Ihuoma as Chioma
- Sabinus Mole as Amaka
- Dike Ngwube as Ogogo
- Somtoo Obasi as Newborn baby
- Ebele Okaro-Onyiuke as Lolo
- Stanley Okereke as Okonkwo
- Georgina Onuoha as Buchi
- Nkiru Sylvanus as Omalechi
- Paul Udonsi as Ikechukwu
- Chikezie Uwazie as Obiora
- Uchemba Williams as Ikemefuna Jnr.

== Synopsis ==
A prince on the verge of death needs to be saved by the magical egg of life. According to the Priestess, getting the egg requires a group of girls to go to the forest and it has to be done in order to save his life according to the.

== See also ==
- Funke Akindele
- Amaechi Muonagor
- Who's the boss (2020 film)
