= Lady Skollie =

South African artist (born 1987)

Lady Skollie (born Laura Windvogel in 1987) is a South African feminist artist and activist from Cape Town, currently living in Johannesburg.

== Life ==
Lady Skollie's art education began when her mother enrolled her in Frank Joubert Art Centre, now called Peter Clarke Art Centre. She continued on to receive a BA of History and Art in Dutch Literature from the University of Cape Town in 2009 and a Certificate in Business Acumen for Artists from the University of Cape Town Graduate School of Business in 2014.

== Career ==
Skollie quickly deviated from the traditional art scene and took to promoting her work via social media. Lady Skollie's work focuses on concepts of gender, desire, sex and sexuality, intimacy, and consent in South Africa.

Through her pseudonym and artistic personality, Lady Skollie, the artist aimed to create an agency in which she communicates themes that are difficult to directly speak about. The term "Skollie" is a historical term that originates in the Dutch colonized South Africa. Historically, white people used the term to identify a black person whom they considered untrustworthy or having come from an undesirable community.

In 2020 Lady Skollie was part of the first South African Netflix Series "Queen Sono". She played the role of Safiya Sono, the mother of Queen Sono. The same year she also won the 10th annual FNB Art Prize, a prestigious South African Art Award.

== Awards ==
- 2020: 10th annual FNB Art Prize.
- 2020: [https://www.gq.co.za/more/woman-of-the-year-lady-skollie-5b2ab30b-34e9-4e91-addf-9a3c24063215%7Caccess-date=25 GQ

Won the coveted Standard Bank Young Artist of the Year award in 2022 Awarded the chance to design a circulation R5 coin for the South African Government

== Exhibits ==
- 2014: Skattie Celebrates Laura Windvogel, Association for Visual Arts Gallery, Cape Town, South Africa.
- 2015: Vroeg Ryp, Vroeg Vrot by Lady Skollie, Stevenson Gallery, Johannesburg, South Africa.
- 2015: Ask for what you want by Lady Skollie, WorldArt Gallery, Cape Town, South Africa.
- 2015: 'The only reason’ by Lady Skollie, Stevenson Gallery RAMP Project, Cape Town, South Africa.
- 2016: Hottentot Skollie, part of Tomorrows/Today, special project curated by Azu Nwabogu and Ruth Simbao, Cape Town Art Fair, Cape Town, South Africa.
- 2016: SEX, Stevenson Gallery, Johannesburg, South Africa.
- 2017: Lust Politics, Tyburn Gallery, London, UK.
- 2019: Good & Evil, Circa, Johannesburg, South Africa.
- 2020: Bound, Everard Read Gallery, Johannesburg, South Africa.
- 2021: A prediction, Everard Read Gallery, Johannesburg, South Africa.

== Filmography ==
Year	Title	Role	Notes
2020	Queen Sono	Safiya Sono	Recurring role

== Podcast ==
Lady Skollie produced and presented a podcast titled Kiss and Tell on Assembly Radio, a Cape Town based internet radio station.
