= Dann-Jacques Mouton =

South African actor (born 1986)

Dann-Jaques Mouton
- Born: Dann-Jaques Mouton; 15 June 1986 (age 40); Kraaifontein, Western Cape, South Africa
- Education: Eben Donges High School, University of Cape Town
- Occupation: Actor
- Years active: 2009–present

Dann-Jaques Mouton is a South African film, television, and theatre actor.

== Early life ==
Mouton was born in 1986 in Kraaifontein, Western Cape, South Africa. He matriculated at Wynberg Senior Secondary. He obtained a Diploma in Theatre and Performance from UCT.

== Theatre ==
His acting credits include:

- Die Kragbox (2011)
- Ek Sien 'n Man (2011)
- Antony and Cleopatra Maynardville (2011)
- Die Vreemdeling (2010)
- Autopsy (2010)
- As You Like It Maynardville Voices Made Night (2009)

== Television ==
He played the role of Justin Booysen in the daily SABC2 program 7de Laan.

== Films ==
He played in the following films:

- Noem my Skollie Call Me Thief (2016)
- Thys & Trix (2018)
- Tess (2016)
- Abraham (2015)

== Awards ==
SAFTA award for the best actor in Noem my Skollie Call Me Thief.
