= Savage Beauty (TV series) =

South African drama series

- Genre: Thriller; Drama
- Created by: Lebogang Mogashoa
- Directed by: Denny Miller; Rea Rangaka; Thati Pele
- Starring: Rosemary Zimu; Dumisani Mbebe; Nthati Moshesh; Angela Sithole; Jesse Suntele; Nambitha Ben-Mazwi; Oros Mampofu; Mpho Sebeng
- Music by: Kyle Shepherd
- Country of origin: South Africa
- Original languages: English; Sotho
- No. of seasons: 2
- No. of episodes: 12

Production
- Executive producers: Harriet Gavshon; Nimrod Geva; Lebogang Mogashoa
- Producers: Siphiwe Hlabangane; JP Potgieter
- Cinematography: Tom Marais
- Editors: Mmapula Letsoalo; Aluta Mlisana; Matthew Swanepoel
- Camera setup: Multi-camera
- Running time: 43–54 minutes
- Production company: Quizzical Pictures

Original release
- Network: Netflix
- Release: 12 May 2022 – present

Savage Beauty is a South African drama television series that was released on 12 May 2022 on Netflix. The series was written by Lebogang Mogashoa. It centers on a mysterious woman who, as part of a plan to exact revenge for her tragic past, enmeshes herself in a family that controls a global beauty empire while hiding some dark secrets. Season 1 amassed 10,630,000 viewing hours within its first week and ranked among Netflix's Top 10 TV shows in 13 countries in that same period. Season 2 was released on 28 June 2024.

== Plot ==
The series revolves around Bhengu Beauty, a South African global beauty empire and Zinhle Manzini, the face of the brand, who surreptitiously plots her revenge against the Bhengu family. The public is unaware that Don and Grace Bhengu's lucrative beauty business was founded on the immoral practice of testing a skin-lightening product on children. That is, until one of two survivors, Zinhle, appears 15 years later with a plan to expose them and ruin their empire.

== Cast ==
=== Main ===
- Rosemary Zimu as Zinhle Manzini - one the skin bleaching testing surviving children and Mahle and Bonga sisters. Sh was introduced as the face of Bhengu Beauty before dying in the hands of Grace Bhengu
- Dumisani Mbebe as Don Bhengu - the ruthless cunning husband of Grace and Thando Bhengu. A greedy businessman whose quest for power can lead him to do anything before dying in the hands of Ndu and Grace Bhengu.
- Nthati Moshesh as Grace Bhengu - the wife who stood by Don through every step of their empire. She sometimes sold her self to the devil in the name of being a power couple up until she could handle the monster she married for nearly 4 decades
- Angela Sithole as Thando Bhengu - the new young wife of Don Bhengu whose life is turned upside down after saying her vows to Don Bhengu. She later realise that everything that Don Bhengu built came at the very dirty cost and he was not prepared to change himself for anybody including her.
- Jesse Suntele as Phila Bhengu - The eldest son of Don and Grace Bhengu who was raised to take over the Bhengu Beauty until he discovered he has an older half sister Linda who is willing to do anything to impress their father.
- Nambitha Ben-Mazwi as Linda Bhengu - the prodigal daughter whose return has Don Bhengu breathing by choke. She does everything her father needs her to do before losing it all after she was caught having an affair with Don Bhengu's second wife, Thando.
- Oros Mampofu as Ndu Bhengu - the gracious son of Grace and Don Bhengu who was the family moral composer. He was born in the wrong family but had
- no choice to co exit between those lies before dying in the hands of his father Don Bhengu.
- Mpho Sebeng as Bonga Manzini - the protective and supportive brother of Zinhle who has been by her side since they survived the Bhengu fire. He helped Zinhle in quest to expose the Bhengu before dying in the hands of Don Bhengu.
- Tony Kgoroge as Richard Moloto - the new Bhengu Beauty threath who has access to the empire from all sides with the aim of destroying the Bhengus after they killed his wife Debbie Webster Moloto. Don and his daughter use their influence and connection to tear the Bhengus died before both of them gets personally attached to one of the Bhengus

=== Recurring ===
- Vaughn Lucas as Peter
- John Ncamane as Kolobe
- Tina Redman as Zandi
- Nandi Mbatha as Ruby
- Didintle Khunou as Vee
- Thami Ngoma as Regina
- Khutjo Green as Chief Nurse
- Slindile Nodangala as Gogo Simphiwe
- Bridget Masinga as Bhengu PR Person
- Eve Rasimeni as Nurse Noni
- Vele Manenje as Makhosi Mnisi
- Mnatha Vika as Doctor

== Episodes ==
Series overview
Series	Episodes	Originally released
1	6	12 May 2022
2	6	28 June 2024

=== Season 1 (2022) ===
No. overall	No. in season	Title	Directed by	Written by	Original release date
1	1	Episode 1	Denny Miller & Rea Rangaka	Lebogang Mogashoa	12 May 2022
2	2	Episode 2	Denny Miller & Rea Rangaka	Neo Sibiya	12 May 2022
3	3	Episode 3	Thati Pele & Rea Rangaka	Nelisa Ngcobo	12 May 2022
4	4	Episode 4	Thati Pele & Rea Rangaka	Nelisa Ngcobo	12 May 2022
5	5	Episode 5	Rea Rangaka	Neo Sibiya	12 May 2022
6	6	Episode 6	Rea Rangaka	Lebogang Mogashoa	12 May 2022

=== Season 2 (2024) ===
No. overall	No. in season	Title	Directed by	Written by	Original release date
7	1	Episode 1	Rea Rangaka	Lebogang Mogashoa	28 June 2024
8	2	Episode 2	Rea Rangaka	Lebogang Mogashoa	28 June 2024
9	3	Episode 3	Matshepo Maja	Nelisa Ngcobo	28 June 2024
10	4	Episode 4	Harold Holscher	Christa Biyela	28 June 2024
11	5	Episode 5	Harold Holscher	Nelisa Ngcobo	28 June 2024
12	6	Episode 6	Rea Rangaka	Lebogang Mogashoa	28 June 2024
