= Dean Fourie =

South African actor

- Born: Dean Fourie; South Africa
- Occupation: Actor
- Years active: 1993–present
- Website: http://www.deanfourie.com

Dean Fourie (born 15 December 1969) is a South African actor. He is best known for the roles in the films Five Fingers for Marseilles, Action Point and Mandela: Long Walk to Freedom.

== Career ==
In 1993, he made the television debut Tropical Heat with a minor role as a 'Guide'. However, he made three more acting appearances in the same year, including the TV movie Daisy de Melker and played the lead role of Rhodes Cecil Cowle. In 1996, he made the film debut with the film Rhodes. He played the role of Lance Corporal, a supporting role. His most notable roles in cinema came through Renegade Cowboy in 2014, and then the 2017 blockbuster Five Fingers for Marseilles. He played Honest John in the latter film, which received mostly positive reviews and screened at several international film festivals. It was later screened in the Discovery section at the 2017 Toronto International Film Festival as well.

In 2015, he appeared in the British BBC docudrama The Gamechangers directed by Owen Harris. In the drama, he played the supporting role of Ray Reiser.

In later 2018, he played Inspector in the film Action Point. In 2019, he joined the television documentary Welcome to Murdertown with the supporting role of Ken Leighty.

== Filmography ==
Year	Film	Role	Genre	Ref.
1993	Tropical Heat	Guide	TV series	
1993	Daisy de Melker	Rhodes Cecil Cowle	TV movie	
1995	The Redemption: Kickboxer 5	First Inmate	Video film	
1995	The Syndicate	Tom Archer	TV series	
1996	Rhodes	Lance Corporal / Horseman	Film	
2005	The Triangle	Seaman	TV mini-series	
2013	Mandela: Long Walk to Freedom	Duty Officer	Film	
2014	Renegade Cowboy		Film	
2015	The Gamechangers	Ray Reiser	TV movie	
2016	Cape Town	Bob Venter	TV mini-series	
2017	Five Fingers for Marseilles	Honest John	Film	
2018	Action Point	Inspector	Film	
2018	Welcome to Murdertown	Ken Leighty	TV series documentary	

== See also ==
- List of South African films
