= Zethu Dlomo =

South African actress

- Born: Zethu Dlomo; 31 March 1989 (age 37); Lenasia, South Africa
- Education: National School of the Arts; University of the Witwatersrand
- Occupation: Actress
- Years active: 2009–present
- Spouse: Lebogang Mphahlele (m. 2018)

Zethu Dlomo-Mphahlele (born 31 March 1989) is a South African actress. She is best known for the role 'Madi' in the American television serial Black Sails.

== Personal life ==
She was born on 31 March 1989 in Lenasia, Gauteng province, South Africa. She was later raised in Mmesi Park, Dobsonville, Soweto. She first studied at The National School of the Arts. In 2010, she graduated with a Bachelor's Degree Honours in Dramatic Art at University of the Witwatersrand.

In September 2018, she married her longtime partner and fellow actor Lebogang Mphahlele.

== Career ==
In 2012, she played the lead role in the sci-fi television series Room 9 telecast in the SABC 1. She played the role 'Detective Alice Kunene' in the series. Meanwhile, she has featured on several international shows; such as HBO series Number One Ladies Detective Agency in 2008 as 'Baone Magasane'. Then in 2013, she appeared in a cameo role 'Patience' in a feature film Mary and Martha directed by Phillip Noyce.

In 2014, she also featured in Canadian Broadcasting Corporation (CBC) and BET International (BET)'s Book of Negroes where she played the role of the pregnant slave 'Sanu'. In 2014, she made her film debut with the film Fanie Fourie's Lobola as 'Dinky Magubane'. For her role, she won both a South African Film and Television Awards (SAFTA) in 2014 and South Africa India Film and Television Awards (SAIFTA) in 2013 nomination in the category of 'Best Actress in a Feature Film'. Later in the year, she played a supporting role on season 1 of the television series Ayeye as 'Sibongile'. In 2015, she was cast for the role 'Madi' in the third season of Black Sails, a Starz Network series. She continued to play for 16 episodes in the recurring cast with the role as Mr. Scott's daughter, Madi until the end of fourth season. The series gave her international recognition.

In the meantime, Dlomo won the award for the 'Brett Goldin Best Newcomer' at the 2014/2015 Naledi Theatre Awards for her multiple characters in the stage play Have You Seen Zandile? directed by Khutjo Green. In 2017, she moved to Africa to act in the South Africa's most popular telenovelas Isibaya. In the serial, she played the role of 'Nonhlanzi' aka 'LethuHlatshwayo'. Then, she featured in two stage plays: Jero which is directed by Dominique Gumede, and then in Play directed by Khutjo Green.

In late 2017, she appeared in the first South African western film Five Fingers for Marseilles. She played the character as 'Lerato'. The film had its world premier at the Toronto International Film Festival later released in cinemas in the United States of America in September 2018. In 2018, Dlomo starred in the film Mandela's Gun directed by John Irvin. She played the role of Winnie, Nelson Mandela's wife in the film. The film had its world premier in New York, Harlem NY. Later in the same year, she joined the Mzansi Magic Sunday evening drama The Herd with the role 'Lwandle'.

In the year 2020, she worked in a short film Hotel on the Koppies written and directed by Charlie Vundla. Then she joined with a SABC 1 mini-series titled Amazing Grace with the role of 'Sarah'. Finally before COVID-19 pandemic, she played the role 'Lindo Cele' in the drama series Erased telecast through Moja Love Channel.

== Filmography ==
| Year | Film | Role | Genre | Ref. |
|---|---|---|---|---|
| 2008 | Number One Ladies Detective Agency | Baone Magasane | TV series | |
| 2012–2013 | Room 9 | Alice Kunene | TV series | |
| 2013 | Mary and Martha | Patience | TV movie | |
| 2013 | Fanie Fourie's Lobola | Dinky Magubane | Film | |
| 2014 | Leading Lady | Model Photographer | Film | |
| 2014 | Ayeye | Sibongile | TV series | |
| 2015 | The Book of Negroes | Sanu | TV mini-series | |
| 2016–2017 | Black Sails | Madi | TV series | |
| 2017 | Isibaya | Nonhlanzi aka LethuHlatshwayo | TV series | |
| 2017 | Five Fingers for Marseilles | Lerato | Film | |
| 2018 | Mandela's Gun | Winnie Mandela | Film | |
| 2020 | Hotel on the Koppies | Winnie Mandela | Short film | |
| 2020 | Amazing Grace | Sarah | TV mini-series | |
| 2020 | Erased | Lindo Cele | TV series | |
