= Ayeye: Stripped =

- Genre: Drama
- Written by: Zaba LeRoto Hlatshwayo
- Directed by: Athi Petela; Thabang Moleya
- Starring: Rosemary Zimu; Moya Maweni; Zama Ngcobo; Luthando Mthembu; Kealeboga Masango; Awande Mondhlane
- Theme music composer: Mino Music
- Country of origin: South Africa
- Original languages: English; Zulu; Sesotho
- No. of seasons: 1
- No. of episodes: 13

Production
- Executive producer: Thabang Moleya
- Producer: Janine Kuhn
- Editor: Ula Oelsen
- Running time: 46–52 minutes
- Production company: Seriti Films

Original release
- Network: Mzansi Magic
- Release: August 5 – October 28, 2022

Related
- Ayeye (Season 1)

Ayeye: Stripped is the second season of Ayeye, a 2022 South African drama series. Executively produced by Thabang Moleya, who also co-directed the series with Athi Petela, and written by Zaba LeRoto Hlatshwayo. It was released on 5 August 2022 on Mzansi Magic and has been available for streaming exclusively on Showmax since 2024, starring Rosemary Zimu as the lead actor.

== Plot ==
Ayeye: Stripped follows the unexpected death of the baby daddy of Zoleka, which puts her in a difficult situation, and loses everything. Regardless of the pain of the passing of Mguyo, she needs to find a way to get back on her feet and provide for her son, Sandile.

== Cast ==
- Rosemary Zimu as Zoleka
- Moya Maweni as Sandile
- Zama Ngcobo as Nosmilo
- Luthando Mthembu as Mbuso
- Kealeboga Masango as Ntsiki
- Awande Mondhlane as Vusi
- Pabee Mogopa as Tumi
- Charles Phasha as Lwande
- Tebogo Thobejane as Tsholo
- Sipho Mbele as Mguyo

== Episodes ==
| No. | Title | Original release date |
|---|---|---|
| 1 | TBA | 5 August 2022 |
An unexpected death puts Zoleka in a difficult situation and she loses everything. Despite the pain of her losses, she needs to find a way to get back on her feet and provide for her son.
| 2 | TBA | 12 August 2022 |
Zoleka is invited to Mquyo's funeral against Nosmilo's wishes. Meanwhile, Lwande continues his advances on Zoleka, who receives a promising text from her first subscriber.
| 3 | TBA | 19 August 2022 |
Zoleka gets a painful lesson about the FanSpace game when she is hustled by a client. Meanwhile, her son is dealing with issues of his own and feels neglected by his mother.
| 4 | TBA | 26 August 2022 |
Zoleka finds out that Mquyo has left her and Sandile an inheritance. However, Nosmilo makes it clear that she will be disputing Zoleka's portion of the will.
| 5 | TBA | 2 September 2022 |
Zoleka finds herself back in the Shezi mansion with growing hostilities between her and Nosmilo. Lwande goes out his way to make her life difficult and offers her an interesting proposal.
| 6 | TBA | 9 September 2022 |
Zoleka's life takes off and she is able to make enough money to appoint lawyers and moves her son into a new apartment. She also ruffles Nosmilo's feathers by buying Vusi an expensive gift.
| 7 | TBA | 16 September 2022 |
Zoleka makes the decision to leave Tsholo in light of recent success. The bond between brothers Vusi and Sandile is cemented. Sandile gathers the courage to speak to his crush. Ntsiki acknowledges her mother's feelings.
| 8 | TBA | 23 September 2022 |
Zoleka is on a high and falling for her favorite subscriber. She soon realises it's Lwande and wants nothing to do with him and refuses to give him his money back.
| 9 | TBA | 30 September 2022 |
The ripple effects of Zoleka's leaks hit her from all angles and her relationship with Sandile is broken. Ntsiki begins to see her through Nosmilo's lens while Nosmilo plans to use it as a weapon in court.
| 10 | TBA | 7 October 2022 |
Zoleka finds out that she is the last to be there for her son in his time of need. A social worker interrogates Zoleka and questions her parenting skills.
| 11 | TBA | 14 October 2022 |
After deliberation, Zoleka decides to take the interview on Tumi's podcast. The interview has ripple effects for Nosmilo, Tsholo and Lwande. Dee and the other girls turn on Tsholo.
| 12 | TBA | 21 October 2022 |
Zoleka escapes Lwande's sick attempt at vengeance. She lets Mbuso off the leash and focuses on rebranding herself professionally, but her image has been too tarnished by the FanSpace life.
| 13 | TBA | 28 October 2022 |
Sandile comes back and Zoleka gives him her full support as he prepares for the national orchestra competition. Ntsiki and Vusi try to appeal to their mother but soon realise that she may never change.

== Reception ==
=== Awards and nominations ===
| Year | Award | Category | Recipient | Result | Ref |
|---|---|---|---|---|---|
| 2023 | South African Film and Television Award | Best Achievement in Scriptwriting - TV Drama | Zaba LeRoto Hlatshwayo for "Ayeye: Stripped" | Lost | |
