= J-Flo =

South African actor (born 1992)

Jesse Suntele
- Born: Jesse Suntele; 18 September 1992 (age 33); Johannesburg, South Africa
- Other names: Officer Bae; J-Flo; Juggernaut Jesse
- Occupations: Actor; Model; Rapper; Television personality
- Years active: Actor: 2014–present; Rapper: 2017–present
- Musical career
- Genres: Hip hop
- Instruments: Vocals

Jesse Suntele (born 18 September 1992) is a South African actor, model, rapper and television personality. He became popular by winning the second season of the BET reality competition series Top Actor Africa in 2016.

== Early life and education ==
Jesse Suntele was born in Johannesburg, South Africa. He attended primary school at Fairsand Primary School before moving to Bloemfontein in grade 4. After matriculating from St. Joseph's Christian Brothers College, he moved back to Johannesburg to study Sound Engineering at the Academy of Sound Engineering.

== Career ==
=== Television ===
In 2013, he auditioned for the SABC 1 reality competition U Can Do It and made it into the Top 10. In 2014, he got a starring role in the first-season finale of the SABC 1 documentary-drama Ngempela, which was his first credited television acting role.

In 2015, he got a guest starring role on SABC 1's Generations: The Legacy. In that same year, he got his first recurring role on the e.tv soapie Ashes to Ashes. The following year in 2016, he won the second season of Top Actor Africa on BET. In that same year, he debuted on the Mzansi Magic telenovela The Queen, making his first appearance in the first season as Tuelo ("Officer Bae"), a policeman by day and a serial killer by night.

In 2017, he was also one of the main hosts for entertainment and variety show BET A-List. He also joined the cast of the Vuzu Amp reality competition series The Hustle, where he was one of the Season 2 contestants, using the rapper stage name "J-Flo" and made it into the Top 6. In that same year, he was nominated in the Feather Awards, for Hunk of the Year.

In 2018, he joined the e.tv soapie Rhythm City in the role of Nqaba.

In 2022, Suntele was cast as Phila Bhengu in the South African Netflix drama series Savage Beauty.

=== Music ===
He has released music as J-Flo, his singles include High by the Beaches and Outta Town. He has also been featured on Kelly Khumalo's single Jehova.

In May 2021, he released his debut EP, What Did You Expect.

== Filmography ==
=== Television ===
Year	Title	Role	Notes
2014	Ngempela	Sandile	starring role
2015–2016	Ashes to Ashes	Kabelo	recurring role
2015	Generations	Himself	guest star
2016	Mutual Friends	Himself	guest star
2016	BET A-List	Himself	Host
2016	The Queen	Tuelo ("Officer Bae")	recurring role
2017	The Hustle	Himself (J-Flo)	contestant
2018	Rhythm City	Mzi	recurring role
2022	Savage Beauty	Phila Bhengu	main role
2023	The Estate	Thato	guest role
2023	In Your Dreams	Marcus	main role
2025	Meet the Khumalos	Sizwe Khumalo	main role

== Discography ==
=== Singles ===
List of promotional singles with title, year, peak chart positions and album
Title	Year	Peak chart positions			Album
Title	Year	SA. Charts Top 100	RISA Top 100	Billboard (South Africa)	Album
"W.D.U.E (intro)"	2021	—	98	—	What Did You Expect
"Tell Me"	2021	79	—	—	What Did You Expect
"Palm Shade"	2021	—	—	—	What Did You Expect
"Jehovah" (Kelly Khumalo ft J-Flo)	2021	1	1	6	Non-album single
"Liquid Gold"	2021	—	98	—	What Did You Expect
"Premonition" (Yung Tyran ft J-Flo)	2021	44	66	23	
"Champion Parade (Yung Tyran ft J-Flo)	2023	23	34	—	
"Vanilla Sky"	2025	—	81	—	TBA
"Forever We"	2025	—	94	—	TBA
"Made To Last"(ft Khosi Ngema)	2025	—	98	—	Music From Meet The Khumalos: Original Score
"—" denotes items which were not released in that country or failed to chart.

== Awards and recognition ==
Year	Award	Category	Result
2016	BET	Top Actor Africa	Won
2017	Feather Awards	Hunk Of the Year	Nominated

- 2018 Cosmo Sexiest Men Finalist
- 2018 Mzansi's Sexiest top 12
