= Carmen Solomons =

South African fashion model (born 1991)

- Born: Carmen Lee Solomons; 28 May 1991 (age 35); Kraaifontein, South Africa
- Occupation: Fashion model
- Modeling information
- Height: 1.71 m (5 ft 7 1/2 in)
- Hair color: Red
- Eye color: Green
- Agency: Major Model Management (New York); Boss Models (Cape Town); Scoop Models (Copenhagen); Core Artist Management (Hamburg); Photogenics LA (Los Angeles)

Carmen Lee Solomons is a South African fashion model. She is best known as one of the faces of Fenty Beauty and Kylie Cosmetics.

== Early life ==
Solomons was born in the town of Kraaifontein just outside Cape Town. Before modelling, Solomons worked as a secretary at a medical office.

== Career ==
Solomons has modeled for Kanye West's Yeezy clothing line. She has also modeled for the Kendall + Kylie clothing line. She has appeared in music videos for recording artists Usher and Cardi B. She has also appeared in an Aerie campaign.
