= Eben Dönges High School =

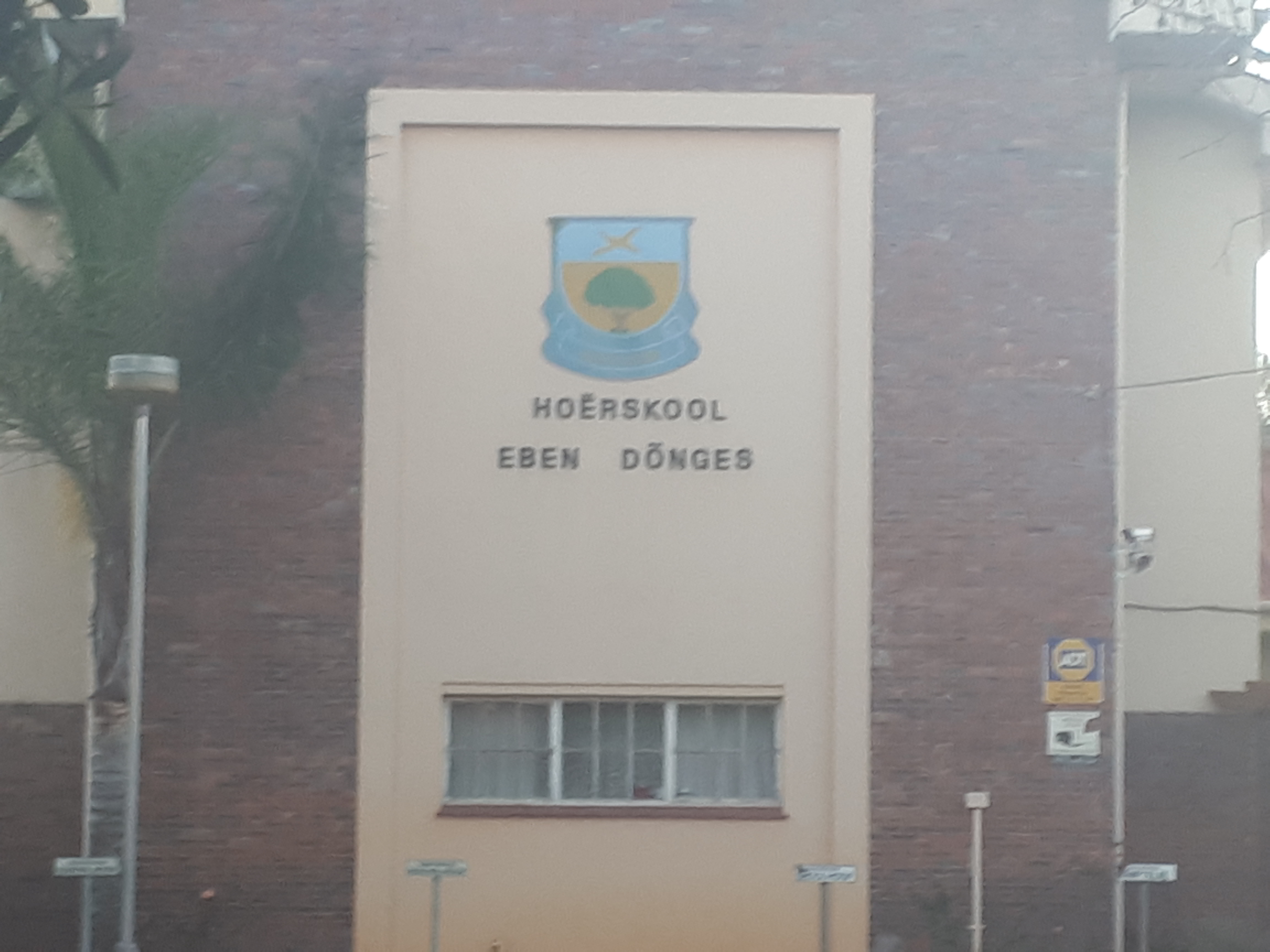
- The school in 2018

Location
- Kraaifontein, Western Cape; South Africa; 33.845695°S 18.728412°E

Information
- School type: Public School
- Motto: Excelsior (Latin) Translated : Excellence
- Established: 1961
- Status: Active
- Principal: Meyer, G.M.
- Grades: 8-12
- Gender: Co-Ed
- Enrollment: 800
- Language: Afrikaans, English
- Hours in school day: 07:50 - 14:15
- Colors: Blue, White
- Slogan: Learning today, succeeding tomorrow.
- Rival: Monument Park High School
- Feeder schools: Fanie Theron Primary

Eben Dönges High School (Hoërskool Eben Dönges) is a government-funded high school in Kraaifontein, Western Cape, South Africa.

== Founded ==
It was established in 1961.

== Name ==
The school is named after Theophilus Ebenhaezer Dönges, who was a politician and minister.

== Language and gender ==
Afrikaans and English teaching take place here. Boys and girls are accommodated.

== Alumni ==
Dann-Jacques Mouton, movie and television actor

== Facilities ==
In a 2000 government survey, the school was cited as having good road access, on-site telecommunications and computers, adequate change rooms for its learners, toilets, science labs, two netball courts, two fields for both soccer and rugby and an athletics track field nearby. In 2005 it had 851 students and 32 teachers. In 2006, 15 new computers were supplied by the Khanya project of the Western Cape Education Department, bringing the total to 75.
