= Nthati Moshesh =

South African actress (born 1969)

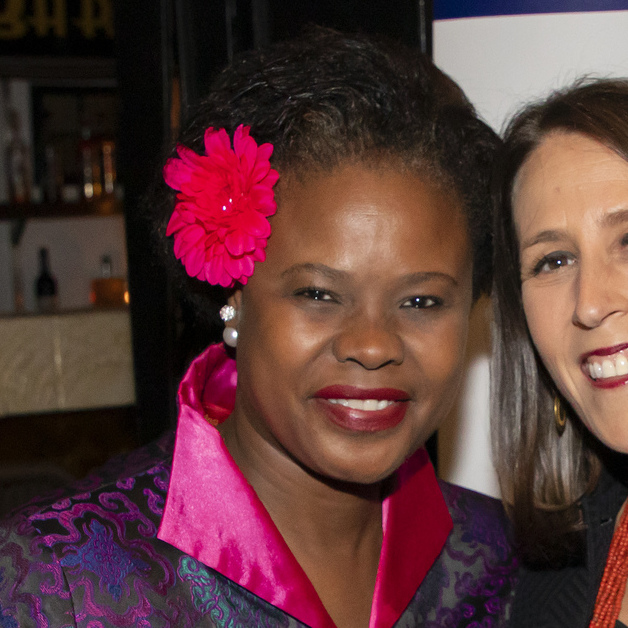
- Moshesh in 2018
- Born: 28 August 1969 (age 56)
- Education: St. Andrew's School for Girls; Technikon Natal
- Occupation: Actress
- Known for: Scandal!
- Relatives: Moneoa (niece)

Nthati Moshesh (born 28 August 1969) is a South African actress. She was nominated for the Africa Movie Academy Award for Best Actress in a Supporting Role in 2016.

== Career ==
Speaking to ENCA on her film and television preferences, she explained that she isn't critical about the televised medium being used, as long as the message is being passed across. She has acted in the TV series Soldier Soldier and Home Affairs and the TV mini-series Human Cargo. However, she stated that film sets requires more sophistication, and she prefers the technicalities that come with it.

In 2014, she was reported to be one of the cast of Saint and Sinners soap, which airs on Mzansi Magic. In 2015, she acted in Ayanda, which opened the 36th Durban International Film Festival. She also got her first AMAA best actress nomination for her role in the film. In 2016, she won the best actress in a lead role award at 2016 South African Film and Television Awards.

In an article from April 2019, she talks about her struggles over the last year not working for eight months, but now she is back on-screen as the no-nonsense cult leader, Masabatha, on hit prison drama, Lockdown.

=== Selected filmography ===
- Cape of Good Hope (2004) as Lindiwe
- Whiskey Echo (2005) as Bernadette
- Beat the Drum (2003) as Frances
- Kini and Adams (1997) as Aida
- The Long Run (2001) as Christine Moyo
- Ayanda (2015) as Dorothy Olandele

=== Selected series ===
- Savage Beauty

== Personal life ==
Following the death of fellow actress, Mary Makgatho, she acknowledged the impact of the actress in the industry. She is reported as being one of the first black graduates in Performing Arts from Technikon Natal. She is an aunt to both Lindsay Moshesh-Van Der Byl, an award-winning motivational speaker and Moneoa Moshesh songwriter and singer.
