= Monument Park High School =

- Hoërskool Monument Park
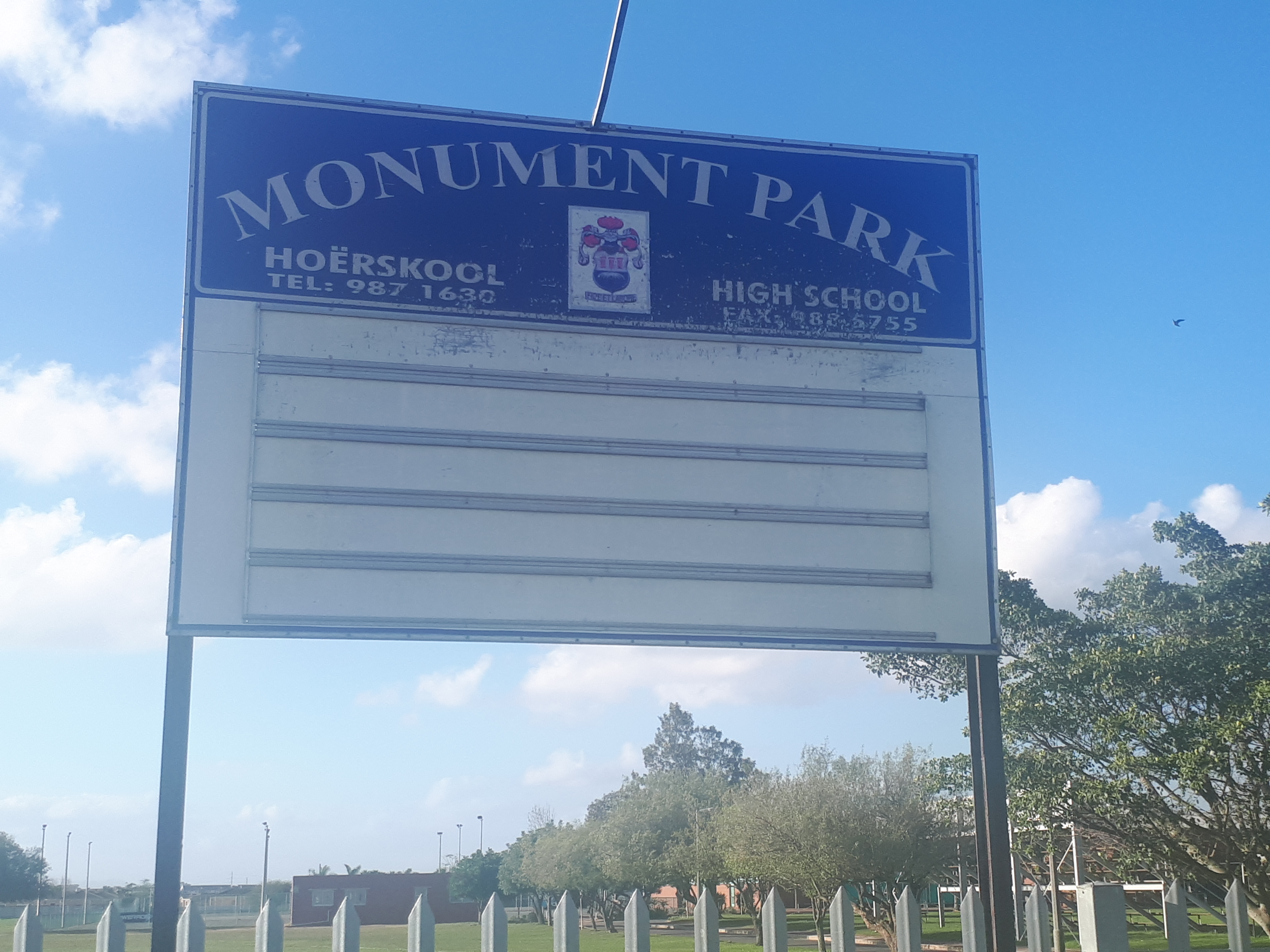
- Monument Park High School today

Location
- Kraaifontein, Western Cape; South Africa; 33.838532°S 18.714577°E

Information
- School type: Public
- Motto: Fide et labore (Latin) (Translated: Faith and hard work)
- Established: 1989
- Principal: K. Stevens
- Grades: 8 - 12
- Gender: Co-Ed, Gypsy
- Enrollment: approx. 1000
- Language: Afrikaans English, Romani
- Colours: Royal Blue, Red and Grey
- Nickname: Parkies
- Rival: Vredenburg High School, Eben Dönges High School
- Feeder schools: Fanie Theron, Aristea, Simonberg PS
- Alumni: Eugene Butterworth, Jacques Engelbrecht, Ryno Louw, Pierre Rossouw, Armand Roux
- Website: Monument Park Official Website

Monument Park High School is a public funded government school in Kraaifontein, Western Cape, South Africa

It opened its doors in 1989.

== Head Masters to follow ==
After Schreuder, Derek Swart took over until early 2008. When Jantjies, D.C. was in charged up to 2016, when the current head master Stevens, K. took over.

== The first matrics ==
The class of 1992 was the first matric class, but the class of 1993 was the first class completing the entire curriculum (Grade 8 to 12) at the school.

== Interschools ==
The very first interschools followed in 1991 against neighbor school Eben Dönges. Currently, the school shares the field with Vredenburg High School and alternates locations annually.

== Notable alumni ==
- Eugene Butterworth Tighthead Prop for Boland, Griekwas and Western Province
- Jacques Engelbrecht Flanker for Boland, EP Kings, Bulls and Western Province
- Edwin Fourie Flanker for Western Province
- Ryno Louw Eighthman for Western Province
- Brandon Valentine Lock for Western Province and Pumas
- Ruan Vermaak Lock for Western Province
- Xander Kuys Hooker for Western Province and Boland

== Other ==
Annually, the music department takes part in the Tygerberg International Eisteddfod. The choir has been invited to perform in the UK in 2017.

The term Running With the Horses was introduced by the principal Mr D. C. Jantjies and became the slogan for leading the school.

The first Head Boy and Head Girl took office in 1992.
