= Wallacedene =

Informal settlement in Western Cape, South Africa

- Location within Western Cape Location within South Africa
- Coordinates: 33°51′30″S 18°44′0″E
- Country: South Africa
- Province: Western Cape
- Municipality: City of Cape Town
- Main Place: Kraaifontein

Area
  - Total: 0.60 km^{2} (0.23 sq mi)

Population (2011)
  - Total: 10,381
  - Density: 17,000/km^{2} (45,000/sq mi)

Racial makeup (2011)
  - Black African: 75.4%
  - Coloured: 22.9%
  - Indian/Asian: 0.3%
  - White: 0.0%
  - Other: 1.4%

First languages (2011)
  - Xhosa: 62.9%
  - Afrikaans: 27.0%
  - Sotho: 3.6%
  - English: 2.8%
  - Other: 3.8%
- Time zone: UTC+2 (SAST)
- Postal code (street): 7570
- PO box: 7570

Wallacedene is an informal housing settlement on the eastern outskirts of Kraaifontein in the Western Cape, South Africa, approximately 33 kilometres (20,5 mi) north-east of Cape Town.

The settlement was established during the 1980s when the relaxation of pass laws allowed rural populations to more readily migrate to urban centres. By 2004, Wallacedene had an estimated population of 21,000 people. The housing rights activist Irene Grootboom lived in Wallacedene. Grootboom and other inhabitants won a Constitutional Court ruling in 2000 which stated that they could not be evicted without being offered alternative accommodation.
