= Thabang Molaba =

South African actor

- Born: Thabang Kamogelo Molaba; Harrismith, Free State, South Africa
- Education: Tshwane University of Technology
- Occupation: Actor
- Years active: 2016–present
- Relatives: Sandile Mahlangu

Thabang Kamogelo Molaba is a South African actor and model. He is best known for his role as KB Molapo in the Netflix series Blood & Water. He first gained prominence when he appeared on the Mzansi Magic telenovela The Queen.

== Early life ==
Molaba was born and raised in Harrismith, Free State to parents Lisbeth and Richard, both of whom are teachers. He is Zulu and Sotho. He participated in drama at the local Tshiame Youth Club and took acting classes with Patricia Boyer before moving to Johannesburg. He graduated with a degree in logistics from Tshwane University of Technology.

== Personal life ==
In July 2021, Molaba opened up about his experiences with therapy.

== Filmography ==
=== Film ===
Year	Film	Role
2025	Now You See Me: Now You Don't	Lethabo Khoza

=== Television ===
Year	Title	Role
2017–2018	The Queen	Gift Mabuza
2018	Ring of Lies	Fumane Nthebe
2018–present	Love: The Web Series	Khumo
2020–present	Blood & Water	Karabo "KB" Molapo
2020	Diamond City	Mak
