= Lindsay Moshesh-Van Der Byl =

South African motivational speaker and social entrepreneur

Lindsay Moshesh-van der Byl
- Born: 8 August 1985 (age 40); East London,South Africa
- Other names: Linzito
- Occupations: Motivational speaker, youth mentor, social entrepreneur, fitness instructor
- Known for: Founder of Cycle 4 Change; motivational speaking on youth empowerment and literacy
- Notable work: Cycle 4 Change; Linzito Inspires

Lindsay Moshesh-van der Byl (born 8 August 1985), also known as Linzito, is a South African motivational speaker, youth mentor, and social entrepreneur. He is best known as the founder of Cycle 4 Change, a literacy and wellness initiative combining cycling, reading, and mentorship programmes for South African youth.

In 2021 he was listed in the Mail & Guardian 200 Young South Africans under the Education and Youth category.

== Early life and education ==
Moshesh-van der Byl was born in East London at Frere Hospital in South Africa and grew up in CC Llyod township as well as Buffalo Flats. He attended both Pefferville and Cranberry Primary schools before moving to Adelaide Gymnasium. He matriculated at Alphendale high school.

== Career ==
Moshesh-van der Byl founded the social enterprise Cycle 4 Change, which uses cycling as a platform to promote literacy, reading, and youth empowerment in disadvantaged communities across South Africa.

He operates under the brand Linzito Inspires and has travelled across South Africa offering motivational speaking, youth mentorship, corporate wellness, and fitness coaching. His talks often focus on resilience, positive mindset, reading culture, and overcoming substance abuse, which he also struggled with when he was a teenager. His multilingual ability—English, Afrikaans, isiXhosa, isiZulu and conversational Sesotho—enables him to engage a broad range of audiences.

== Awards and recognition ==
- Mail & Guardian 200 Young South Africans 2021 (Education/Youth category).
- Avance Media 100 Most Influential Young South Africans 2020–2021 list.
- Recipient of the 2019 Gauteng Premier’s Youth Service and Excellence Award for Sports, Arts & Culture.
- News24’s #100YoungMandela 2018.

== Activities and impact ==
Through Cycle 4 Change, Moshesh-van der Byl has led road-cycling awareness campaigns—such as multi-city tours between Pretoria and Cape Town—raising awareness about literacy and donating books to schools and community libraries. He also promotes healthy living and mental wellness through cycling and motivational speaking, aiming to inspire youth to pursue education, sports, and positive life choices.

== Personal life ==
He uses the name “Linzito” on social media and motivational platforms. He is the cousin of Moneoa Moshesh.
