= Five Fingers for Marseilles =

2017 South African film by Michael Matthews

- Film poster
- Directed by: Michael Matthews
- Screenplay by: Sean Drummond
- Story by: Sean Drummond; Michael Matthews
- Produced by: Asger Hussain; Yaron Schwartzman; Sean Drummond; Michael Matthews
- Starring: Vuyo Dabula; Kenneth Nkosi; Zethu Dlomo
- Cinematography: Shaun Harley Lee
- Edited by: Daniel Mitchell
- Music by: James Matthes
- Production companies: Game 7 Films; Be Phat Motel Company
- Distributed by: Indigenous Film Distribution
- Release dates: 8 September 2017 (TIFF); 6 April 2018 (South Africa)
- Running time: 120 minutes
- Country: South Africa
- Languages: Xhosa; Sesotho; English; Afrikaans

Five Fingers for Marseilles is a 2017 South African neo-Western thriller film written by Sean Drummond and directed by Michael Matthews. It stars Vuyo Dabula, Zethu Dlomo, Kenneth Nkosi, Dean Fourie, Jerry Mofokeng and Warren Masemola, It was screened in the Discovery section at the 2017 Toronto International Film Festival and Fantastic Fest.

== Synopsis ==
A member of The Five Fingers returns to colonial Marseilles after fleeing police aggression about two decades ago, and finds his town under a new threat.

== Cast ==
- Vuyo Dabula as Tau
- Zethu Dlomo as Lerato
- Hamilton Dhlamini as Sepoko
- Kenneth Nkosi as Bongani
- Mduduzi Mabaso as Luyanda
- Aubrey Poolo as Unathi
- Lizwi Vilakazi as Sizwe
- Anthony Oseyemi as Congo
- Jerry Mofokeng as Jonah
- Ntsika Tiyo as Zulu
- Kenneth Fok as Wei
- Warren Masemola as Thuto
- Garth Breytenbach as Officer De Vries
- Dean Fourie as Honest John

== Reception ==
On review aggregator website Rotten Tomatoes, the film holds an approval rating of 80%, based on 15 reviews, and an average rating of 6.9/10.

== Popular culture ==
Five Fingers for Marseilles was enlisted as one of the 8 "reimagined versions" of Western films American singer Beyonce drew inspiration from for her 2024 country studio album, Cowboy Carter.
