= Khosi Ngema =

South African actress (born 1999)

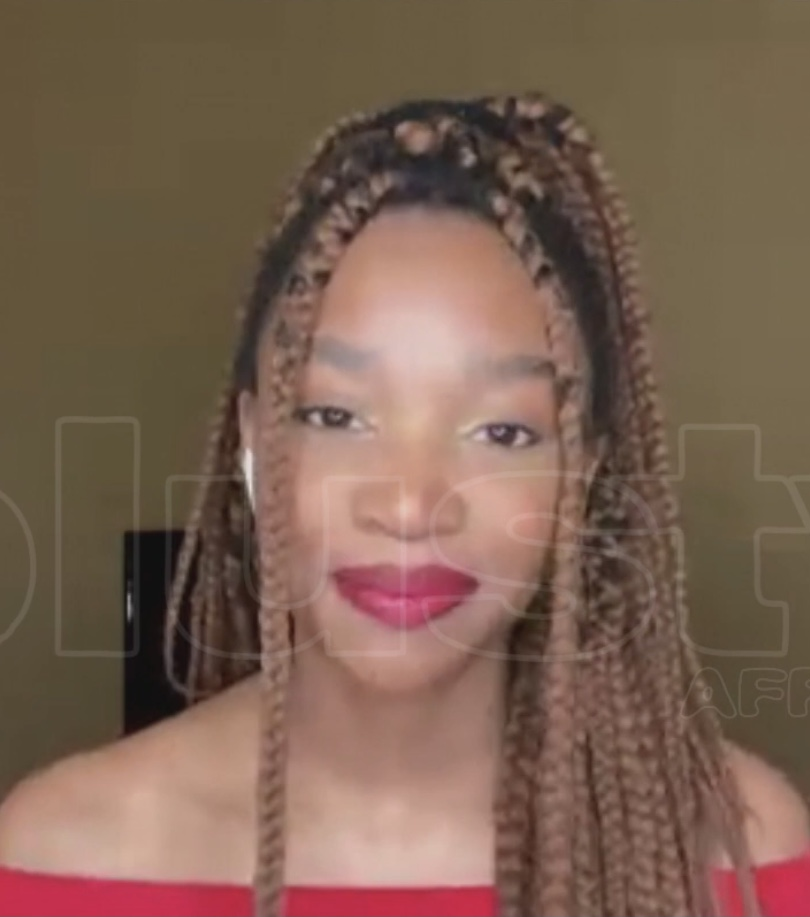
- Ngema in 2020
- Born: Makhosazane Yolanda Ngema; 2 November 1999 (age 26); Johannesburg, South Africa
- Occupations: Actress; singer-songwriter
- Years active: 2020–present
- Known for: As Fikile Bhele on Blood & Water
- Parents: Mangaliso Ngema (father); Busisiwe Ngema (mother)

Khosi Ngema (born 2 November 1999) is a South African actress and singer-songwriter. She is best known for her lead role as Fikile Bhele in the Netflix drama series Blood & Water.

== Early life ==
Ngema was born on 2 November 1999, in Johannesburg, South Africa. She is the daughter of Mangaliso Ngema, who is an actor, and Busisiwe Ngema. Before she began acting professionally, she took dramatic arts in high school and wrote and acted in a few short films and she started writing songs when she was 15.

== Career ==
Ngema began her career in the film industry in 2020 with the role of Fikile Bhele in the series Blood & Water. Through the show, she met and became close with co-star Ama Qamata.

In 2021, Ngema went into business with the launch of her jewelry collection, in partnership with Grace The Brand.

In April 2024, she released her debut single "Why".

== Filmography ==
=== Television ===
Year	Title	Role	Notes
2020–present	Blood & Water	Fikile Bhele	Main role
2023	Elite	Fikile Bhele	Main; Episode: "Punto y coma" (season 7)

=== Film ===
Year	Title	Role	Notes
2024	Invasive	Kay	Main role
2024	Killer Body Count	Ali	
2025	Invasive 2: Getaway	Kay	Main role
2025	Meet The Khumalos	Sphe	Main role
