= The Long Run (film) =

2001 film

- Directed by: Jean Stewart
- Written by: Johann Potgieter
- Produced by: Anant Singh; Helena Spring
- Starring: Armin Mueller-Stahl; Nthati Moshesh
- Cinematography: Cinders Forshaw
- Edited by: Avril Beukes
- Music by: Trevor Jones
- Production companies: Baer Production Company; Distant Horizon
- Distributed by: Universal Focus
- Release date: 4 May 2001 (United States)
- Running time: 112 min
- Country: South Africa
- Language: English

The Long Run is a 2001 film starring Oscar nominee Armin Mueller-Stahl as a running coach and Nthati Moshesh as a young runner. It was directed by Jean Stewart and written by Johann Potgieter.

The film is based around the Comrades Marathon, an ultra-marathon race run over a distance of approximately 90 km (55.9 mi) between the capital of the Kwazulu-Natal Province of South Africa, Pietermaritzburg, and the coastal city of Durban.

== Cast ==
- Armin Mueller-Stahl as Bertold 'Barry' Bohmer
- Nthati Moshesh as Christine Moyo
- Paterson Joseph as Gasa
- Desmond Dube as Miso
- Seputla Sebogodi as Terror
- Gift Leotlela as Popo
- Nakedi Ribane as Blanche
- Wilson Dunster as Suiker
- Chris van Niekerk as Pool
- Elize Cawood as Mrs. Suiker
- Rika Sennett as Greta
- Melody House as Emily

== See also ==
- List of films about the sport of athletics
