= Mangaliso Ngema =

South African actor

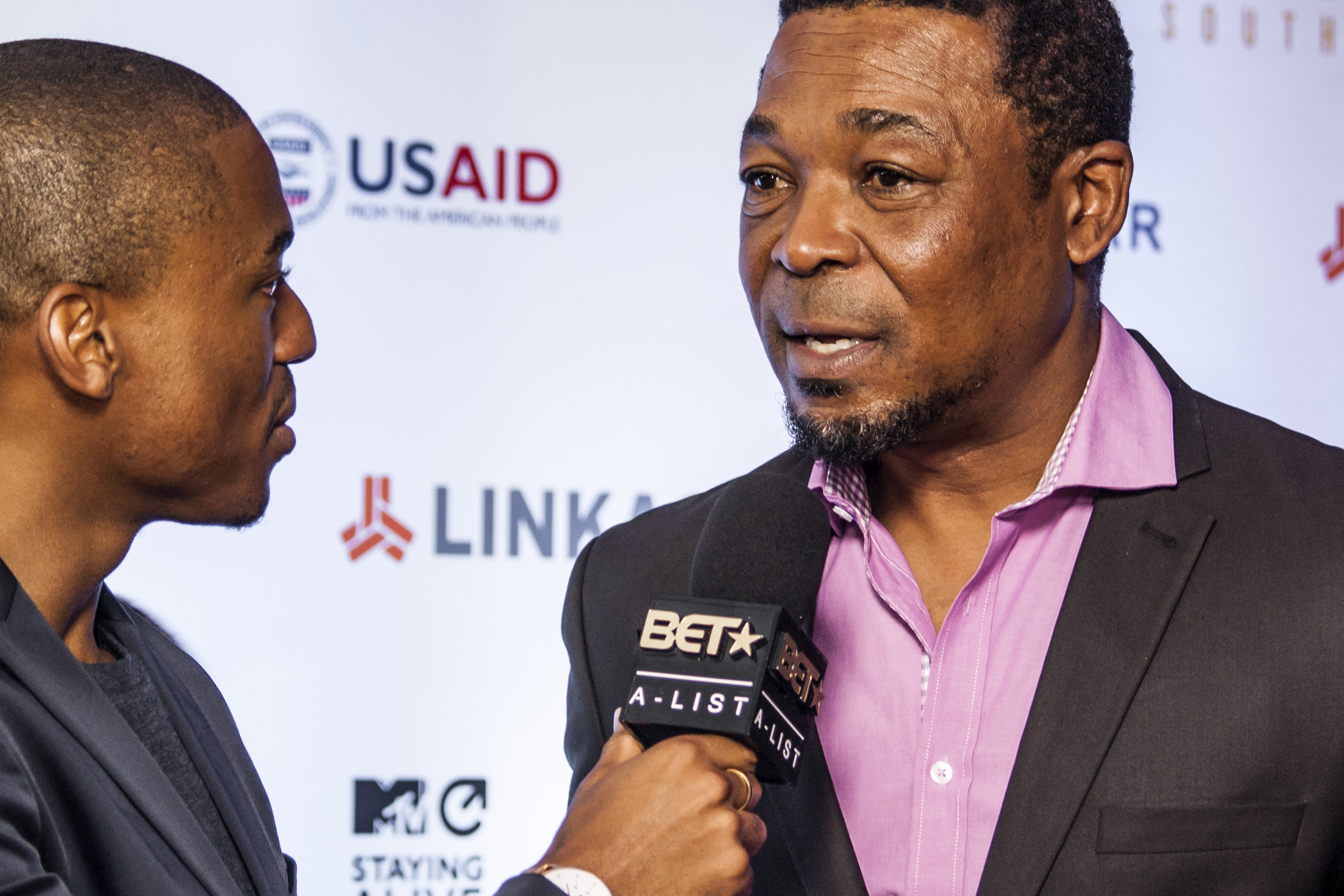
- Born: Mangaliso Ngema; Soweto, South Africa
- Occupation: Actor
- Years active: 2003–present
- Children: 4 (including Khosi Ngema)

Mangaliso Ngema is a South African actor best known for his roles in the popular serials Vehicle 19, Mary and Martha and Lithapo.

== Personal life ==
He was born and raised in Orlando West, Soweto, South Africa.

He was married to a Mozambique woman and is a father of one daughter. However, his baby was sold by the nurse who was working in that hospital. Later his wife also divorced him.

== Career ==
He moved into the corporate world and worked as a brand manager for Guinness. While working there, he made the television debut with the soap opera Generations and played the role of 'Lunga Zondo' in 1993. Then he made several notable appearances in the serials: Home Affairs, Housekeepers, MTV Shuga, Ring of Lies, Mzansi, Side Dish, Soul Buddyz and Single Guyz.

He played the role 'Pabi' on the television serial Lithapo. However, after sexual harassment incident on Lorraine Moropa, he was fired from the show. However he later dispel allegations of sexual harassment.

In September 2020, he appeared in the television serial Family Secrets.

== Rape Allegations ==
In June 2022 Ngema was charged with rape and released on bail after appearing at the Randburg Magistrate's Court.

== Filmography ==
Year	Film	Role	Genre	Ref.
1993	Generatiions	Lunga Zondo	Film	
2006	Tshisa	Thabane Mlongo	Film	
2010	Mrs Mandela	Winnie's Young Lover	Film	
2013	Vehicle 19	Judge James Muzuka	Film	
2013	Mary and Martha	Mozambican Doctor	Film	
2020	Lithapo	Senzo	Film	
