= Queen Sono =

South African Netflix drama

- Promotional release poster
- Genre: Crime drama; Action; Thriller
- Created by: Kagiso Lediga
- Written by: Kagiso Lediga; Karabo Lediga; Camilo Saloojee; Christopher Steenkamp; Muzi Dlamini
- Directed by: Kagiso Lediga; Tebogo Malope
- Starring: Pearl Thusi; Vuyo Dabula; Sechaba Morojele; Chi Mhende; Loyiso Madinga; Rob van Vuuren; Kate Liquorish; Khathu Ramabulana; Enhle Maphumulo; Abigail Kubeka; Connie Chiume; Otto Nobela; James Ngcobo
- Theme music composer: Sauti Sol; Sho Madjozi; Black Motion
- Opening theme: Disco Matanga
- Composer: Zethu Mashika
- Country of origin: South Africa
- Original languages: English; French; Russian; Swahili; Afrikaans; Xhosa; Zulu; Pretoria Sotho; Shona; Yoruba; Xitsonga
- No. of seasons: 1
- No. of episodes: 6

Production
- Executive producers: Kagiso Lediga; Tamsin Andersson
- Cinematography: Motheo Moeng
- Editors: Melissa Parry S.A.G.E.; Gugu Sibandze S.A.G.E.; Khulekani Zondi
- Camera setup: Single-camera
- Running time: 32–47 min
- Production company: Diprente Films

Original release
- Network: Netflix
- Release: 28 February 2020

Queen Sono is a South African crime drama television series created by Kagiso Lediga that premiered on Netflix on February 28, 2020. The series stars Pearl Thusi, Vuyo Dabula, Sechaba Morojele, Chi Mhende, Loyiso Madinga, Rob van Vuuren, Kate Liquorish, Khathu Ramabulana, Enhle Maphumulo, Abigail Kubeka, Connie Chiume, Otto Nobela and James Ngcobo and features Mario Diederiks. It is Netflix's first African original series. (Note: Queen Sono was the first South African series commissioned by Netflix, but Shadow was streamed first on the service since Queen Sono later premiered on February 28, 2020.)

Upon release, it received positive reviews by critics, who praised the direction, cinematography, action sequences and performances. On April 28, 2020, Netflix renewed the series for a second season. However, on November 26, 2020, it was reported that Netflix had cancelled the series because of the production challenges brought on by the COVID-19 pandemic.

== Synopsis ==
Queen Sono follows the story of a secret South African clandestine agent who tackles criminal operations while dealing with crises in her personal life.

== Cast and characters ==
=== Main ===
Queen Sono (Pearl Thusi)

A seasoned field operative of the Special Operations Group (SOG) and daughter of Safiya Sono (Lady Skollie), a deceased South African anti-apartheid revolutionary leader and freedom fighter. As a young orphan, Queen struggled to comprehend the mystery surrounding her mother's assassination case. Years later, she is recruited by the SOG, a South African intelligence agency. Determined to find the answers she seeks, she continues to investigate her family's past and uncover the identity of the true culprit responsible for her mother's death.

Shandu Johnson Magwaza (Vuyo Dabula)

An ex-SOG spy and the second-in-command for the Gromova crime family, led by Ekaterina Gromova. Shandu had a past relationship with Queen during their field days and before he left the agency.

Dr. Sidwell Isaacs (Sechaba Morojele)

As Chief Director of the SOG, Dr. Sidwell Isaacs heads the agency, with its mission statement being to protect the security and welfare of all African citizens across the continent, by thwarting any future threats that could undermine their country's independence and growth. Currently, his work relationship with Queen is quite fraught owing to a lack of trust, evident by his withholding of pertinent intel that would shed the light on the real truth surrounding Safiya's murder case.

Miri Dube (Chi Mhende)

As Director General of the SOG, Miri is a target-oriented, no-nonsense, and ambitious senior officer tasked with overseeing Queen's performance on the field during debriefings. Although she sympathizes with Queen's difficult past, she is often at odds with the agent due to their differing approaches to handling covert missions.

Frederique Kazadi (Loyiso Madinga)

A former hacker and current lead field technician for the SOG. Fred assists Queen with her missions by monitoring her location and providing tech support on fieldthe .

Viljoen (Rob van Vuuren)

A former SOG field agent who later became an analyst after suffering a permanent impairment injury from a past covert operation. He is on friendly terms with Queen.

Ekaterina Gromova (Kate Liquorish)

A high-level security contractor and primary owner of the private military company Superior Solutions, as well as a Russian heiress to the Gromova crime family. During her formative years, Ekaterine was never treated with respect by her family members. Often derided by her father, she was consistently pushed aside in favor of her brother Vitaly Gromova, who was later poised to take control of the Gromova empire. After her father's death, she plans to take charge of the family oligarch and exploit various opportunities to position Super Solutions as a leading military contractor within the African continent.

William Chakela (Khathu Ramabulana)

As the Queen's most trusted confidant, William also acts as her on-call therapist. As a longtime childhood friend, he is one of the few people, she tries to protect and will listen to.

Nova (Enhle Maphumulo)

William's girlfriend, who works as a consultant at the World Bank.

=== Secondary ===
Mazet (Abigail Kubeka)

She is Queen's paternal grandmother.

Nana (Connie Chiume)

Miri's mother, who is a prominent South African key political advisor.

President Malunga (James Ngcobo)

A South African politician, who was investigated for corruption in his earlier days as Deputy President of South Africa.

Bula Bule (Otto Nobela)

A representative of the rebel group Watu Wema and one of Ekaterina's mercenaries.

Hendrikus's Bearded Cousin ( Mario Diederiks )

A cousin of the murderer (Hendrikus) who assassinated Queen's mother - Safiya Sono

== Episodes ==
No.	Title	Directed by	Written by	Original release date
1	"I Am Queen Sono"	Kagiso Lediga	Kagiso Lediga	February 28, 2020
In Zanzibar, Queen Sono (an undercover secret agent) is tasked with obtaining data about a private arms company called Superior Solutions from one of its senior operatives. When the initial plan to hack the data fails due to signal blocking technology, Queen resorts to stealing the required intel manually and engages in a fight with law enforcement operatives after being compromised. She manages to escape using a decoy and, together with her partner Fred, travels back to South Africa to report to their seniors at the Special Operations Group (SOG). There, she learns about a new terrorist group calling themselves the Watu Wema who plan to liberate Africa. Queen later has her friend and therapist William write her a complementary psychological evaluation at the request of her boss Sid. On the anniversary of her mother Safia's assassination, Queen meets with her grandmother Mazet and the two of them visit Safia's grave where a desolate Queen refuses to talk with her mother. In Congo, the Watu Wema appear at a slave mine and kill the guards and superiors, granting freedom to the enslaved miners. Shandu, Queen's ex and a former SOG agent is revealed as the leader of the terrorist group. Queen later receives information that her mother's killer is going to be released on parole due to age and frailty. She later visits him in prison and forces him to tell her what happened on the day of Safia's assassination. His story about shooting Safia as she sat on a park bench is revealed to be a lie when Queen recalls the shooter being in a moving car when she was five years old; revealing that Queen was there when her mother was shot.
2	"Dying Is Sore"	Kagiso Lediga	Camilo Saloojee	February 28, 2020
Queen Sono and Fred are assigned to a reconnaissance mission at Harare, Zimbabwe to investigate and collect information on Elton Davenport, who is later revealed to be Vitaly Gromov, a Russian heir to the Gromova crime family. Victor Gromova, his father, gets murdered by his own daughter by being smothered to death in his hospital bed.
3	"The Devil's Toys"	Tebogo Malope	Muzi Dlamini & Karabo Lediga	February 28, 2020
4	"Rookie"	Tebogo Malope	Karabo Lediga	February 28, 2020
5	"Sugar Water"	Tebogo Malope	Christopher Steenkamp	February 28, 2020
6	"State of Emergency"	Kagiso Lediga	Kagiso Lediga	February 28, 2020

== Production ==
=== Development ===
On December 10, 2018, it was announced that Netflix had given the production a series order for a six-episode first season. The series is created by Kagiso Lediga who is credited as an executive producer alongside Tamsin Andersson. Lediga and Tebogo Malope directed the entirety of the first season. Diprente Films was involved in the production of the series. The first season was released on February 28, 2020. On April 28, 2020, the series was renewed by Netflix for a second season. It was reported on November 26, 2020 that the show had been cancelled, the complications of the pandemic having led to cost increases and difficulty scheduling production.

=== Casting ===
Alongside the series order announcement, it was confirmed that Pearl Thusi would star in the lead role. On June 11, 2019, it was announced Vuyo Dabula, Sechaba Morojele, Chi Mhende, Loyiso Madinga, Rob van Vuuren, Kate Liquorish, Khathu Ramabulana, Enhle Maphumulo, Abigail Kubeka, Connie Chiume, Otto Nobelaand James Ngcobo had joined the cast.

=== Filming ===
Principal photography for the first season was originally scheduled to commence in April 2019. Filming for the first season took place on location in Johannesburg, South Africa, Lagos, Nigeria; Kenya and Zanzibar, Tanzania from June 2019 to August 2019.

== Release ==
On December 10, 2019, an announcement teaser trailer for the series was released by Netflix. On January 30, 2020, Netflix released the official trailer for the series.

== Reception ==
The first season received positive reviews upon its release. The review aggregator website Rotten Tomatoes reported a 91% approval rating with an average rating of 7/10 based on 11 reviews. The website's critical consensus reads, "Queen Sono's twisty, taut thrills are matched with epic action sequences and soapy delights, making Netflix's first South African series a smashing good time." Metacritic, which uses a weighted average, assigned the first season a score of 70 out of 100 based on 5 critics, indicating "generally favorable" reviews.
