= Moneoa Moshesh =

South African singer-songwriter

Moneoa
- Born: Moneoa Moshesh; 6 November 1989 (age 36); Mthatha, South Africa
- Other names: Moneoa
- Occupations: Singer; Songwriter
- Years active: 2012–present
- Television: Full list
- Mother: Treaty Ntsoaki Moshesh
- Relatives: Nthati Moshesh (Auntie)
- Musical career
- Also known as: The Rose
- Origin: Berea, Gauteng, South Africa
- Genres: Afro Soul; House; Afro-pop; Neo-soul; Dance/Electronic
- Labels: Gallo Record Company; Bula Music; CCA
- Website: instagram.com/moneoa

Moneoa Moshesh-Sowazi (born November 6, 1989), is a South African singer-songwriter mononymously known as Moneoa. She came to prominence after the release of her singles, "Is'Bhanxa" and "Pretty Disaster", the latter remixed by Da Capo.

She has starred in a Johannesburg ghetto film circulating (if not projecting) around the 1958 Sophia Town violence against the law enforcement titled Back of the Moon where she portrays Eve Msomi alongside the award-winning S'Dumo Mtshali.

== Discography ==
=== List of studio albums ===
- Coming from Going to (2012)
- Ndim Lo (2014)
- Ndim Lo (Super Deluxe) (White) (2014)
- Ziphi Inkomo (2018)

== Filmography ==
=== Television ===
Year	Title	Role	Notes	Ref.
N/A	#Karektas (season 1)	Herself	Celebrity Guest	
N/A	10 over 10 (season 2)	Herself	Commentator	
N/A	Clash of the Choirs South Africa (season 2)	Herself	Choirmaster	
N/A	Isibaya (season 3)	Herself	Actress	
N/A	Rhythm City (season 1)	Jesse	Supporting character	
N/A	The Bantu Hour (season 1)	Herself	Musical guest	
N/A	The Remix SA (season 1)	Herself	Guest Judge	
N/A	The Road (season 1)	Ntsiki / Dodo	Actress	
N/A	SAMAs	Herself	Performer	
N/A	Zaziwa (season 4)	Herself	Guest	
2013	Zabalza (season 2)	Herself	Celebrity	

=== Films ===
Year	Title	Role	Notes	Ref.
2019	Back of the Moon	Eve Msomi	Main Character	

== Awards and nominations ==
=== World Music Awards ===
Year	Award ceremony	Prize	Recipient/Nominated work	Results	Ref.
2014	World Music Awards	World's Best Song	More Than You	Nominated	
2014	World Music Awards	World's Best Video	More Than You	Nominated	
2014	World Music Awards	World's Best Act	Herself	Nominated	
2014	World Music Awards	World Music Award for World's Best Entertainer of the Year	Herself	Nominated	
2014	World Music Awards	World's Best Female Artist	Herself	Nominated	

=== South African Music Awards ===
Year	Award ceremony	Prize	Recipient/Nominated work	Results	Ref.
2015	SAMAs	Female Artist of the Year	Ndim Lo	Nominated	
2015	SAMAs	Best R&B/Soul/Reggae Album	Ndim Lo	Nominated	
