= Lizwi Vilakazi =

South African actor

- Born: Lizwi Vilakazi; South Africa
- Occupation: Actor
- Years active: 1984–present

Lizwi Vilakazi (born 15 December 1969), is a South African actor. He is best known for the roles in the films Mandela: Long Walk to Freedom and Five Fingers for Marseilles.

== Career ==
He started career with minor guest starring roles on television series as drama Zone 14 telecast on SABC1 and the e.tv drama 4Play: Sex Tips for Girls. In South African television, he is best known for the role as 'Teddy' in the Vuzu Amp drama series aYeYe. With the success of this role, he continued to dominate in South African television with numerous serials such as Isithembiso, Jacob's Cross, The Road and Umlilo.

In 2017, he was selected for a minor role in the biographical film Mandela: Long Walk to Freedom. He played the role of a voter. In 2019, he received a major role in the critically acclaimed South African Western thriller film Five Fingers for Marseilles directed by Michael Matthews. The film had mostly positive reviews and screened at several international film festivals.

=== Television serials ===
- Zone 14 – Season 3 as Little Jimmy
- 4Play: Sex Tips for Girls – Season 1 as Howie
- aYeYe – Season 1 as Teddy
- Isithembiso – Season 1, 2 and 3 as Tiro
- Jacob's Cross – Season 4 as Newspaper Seller
- Jacob's Cross – Season 5 as Drug Dealer
- Single Guyz – Season 1 as Young guy (as Lwizi Vilakazi)
- The Road – Season 1 as Kortes
- Umlilo – Season 2 and 3 as Muzi

== Filmography ==
Year	Film	Role	Genre	Ref.
2017	Mandela: Long Walk to Freedom	Voter	Film	
2017	Five Fingers for Marseilles	Sizwe	Film	

== See also ==
- List of South African films
