= Kraaifontein =

Kraaifontein !gaurukamma
- Town
- Location within Western Cape Location within South Africa
- Coordinates: 33°50′39″S 18°41′55″E
- Country: South Africa
- Province: Western Cape
- Municipality: City of Cape Town
- Established: 1869-Subdividing farms, 1876- Railway station, 1877-Town development

Area
  - Total: 30.82 km^{2} (11.90 sq mi)

Population (2011)
  - Total: 154,615
  - Density: 5,017/km^{2} (12,990/sq mi)

Racial makeup (2011)
  - Black African: 43.3%
  - Coloured: 40.2%
  - Indian/Asian: 0.4%
  - White: 14.4%
  - Other: 1.7%

First languages (2011)
  - Afrikaans: 45.4%
  - Xhosa: 33.4%
  - English: 14.0%
  - Sotho: 2.5%
  - Other: 4.7%
- Time zone: UTC+2 (SAST)
- Postal code (street): 7570
- PO box: 7569
- Area code: +27 (0)21

Kraaifontein is a town in the Western Cape province of South Africa and is located on the north-eastern outskirts of the City of Cape Town Metropolitan Municipality.

The name originated from the large number of crows (Kraai in Afrikaans) that nest in the region.

The name is derived from the Xam word !gauru, ‘crow, white crow’, and kamma, therefore its ǀXam name was !gaurukamma.

Phonetically, the town’s name is pronounced as "Cry-phontaine".

== Beginnings ==
In 1869 sub-division of farm land started in the area. A railway station was formed in 1876 called "Kraaifontein Junction", followed by formal town development in 1877. The first school was established on 20 January 1908. The Dutch Reformed Church was founded in 1948. In the same year Kraaifontein got its own local authority. In 1954 the "Volkskerk van Afrika (Translated- The nation's church of Africa)" was founded with BJE Appollis being the first preacher. On 16 September 1957, it became a municipality under the first mayor, JP Rossouw.

== Today ==
Today, Kraaifontein has been incorporated into the Greater Cape Town metropolitan area and is located in Cape Town's northern suburbs flanking the N1 towards Paarl and Worcester to the east. Although being part of the City of Cape Town Metropolitan Municipality, Kraaifontein is still considered a town with its own central business district.

It comprises several residential areas, namely Windsor Park, Scottsville, Peerless Park, Eikendal, Scottsdene, Bloekombos, Wallacedene, Belmont Park, Bonny Brook, and Uitzicht. Libraries are funded and owned by the City of Cape Town. These libraries are Kraaifontein Public Library, Scottsdene Public Library, and Eikendal Public Library. High Schools in the area are Monument Park, Eben Dönges, Bloekombos, Masibambane Secondary School, Simonsberg Primary School, Scottsdene High School, Scottsville High School and Bernadino Heights High School.

== Geography ==
Strategically located at the gateway to the Cape Winelands, Kraaifontein is halfway between Cape Town (31 km) and Paarl (29 km) along the N1 highway and is flanked by Durbanville to the north-west and Brackenfell to the west.

Kraaifontein, encompassing the areas of Bernardino Heights, Scottsdene, Scottsville, Wallacedene, Eikendal and Bloekombos, was once a separate municipality before the restructuring of all South African municipalities during the late '90s. These areas, however, are listed as separate suburbs by the City of Cape Town for planning and statistical purposes. Forming part of the City of Cape Town Metropolitan Municipality, it is located in its Subcouncil 2 Area, Bergdal.

=== Suburban Areas ===
- Belmont Park
- Bernadino Heights
- Bloekombos
- Bonnie Brae
- Bonnie Brook
- Buh-Rein Estate
- Eikendal
- Joostenberg Vlakte
- Klein Begin
- Kraaifontein Agricultural Holdings
- Kraaifontein East
- Kraaifontein Industrial
- Langeberg Glen
- Langeberg Heights
- Langeberg Ridge
- Peerless Park East
- Peerless Park North
- Peerless Park West
- Scottsdene
- Scottsville
- Summerville
- Uitzicht
- Wallacedene
- Windsor Park
- Windsor Park Estate
- Viking Village
- Zoo Park

== Transport ==
=== Rail ===
Kraaifontein lies at a railway junction (historically known as "Kraaifontein Junction"), situated on the main commuter line between Cape Town and Wellington (Northern Line) and the branch line to Malmesbury, both operated by Metrorail. Metrorail currently operates commuter railway services in Kraaifontein from the Kraaifontein Railway Station (north of the town centre) to Cape Town, Bellville, Brackenfell, Paarl and Wellington on the Northern Line and to Fisantekraal, Klipheuwel and Malmesbury on the Malmesbury branch line.

=== Road ===
The N1 is the major freeway that runs through Kraaifontein, routing traffic heading north-west from Cape Town towards Paarl. It enters the town from Brackenfell, bisecting the town and intersecting the interchanges at the M15 and M167 before heading towards the Cape Winelands.

The R101 is the original N1, and served the same function before the construction of the freeway. It enters Kraaifontein from Brackenfell as Old Paarl Road, runs through the central business district as Voortrekker Road and leaves Kraaifontein towards Klapmuts and Paarl as Old Paarl Road again.

Kraaifontein is also served by many metropolitan routes. The M15 connects to Durbanville and Stellenbosch (via the M23). The M23 connects to Bellville and Stellenbosch, and barely by-passes Kraaifontein to the south. The M25 connects to Brackenfell and Bellville. The M73 connects to Brackenfell and Durbanville. The M137 runs north–south from Brackenfell to Durbanville and by-passes Kraaifontein to the west.

Kraaifontein is also served internally by the M167 which links the eastern suburbs, namely Joostenberg Vlakte, Kraaifontein Industria and Bloekombos.

== Coat of arms ==
The Kraaifontein municipal council assumed a coat of arms, registered it with the Cape Provincial Administration in June 1964, had it granted by the provincial administrator in March 1967, and registered it at the Bureau of Heraldry in September 1969. The arms, designed by Schalk Pienaar, were: Argent, a chevron Gules between in chief two heraldic fountains and in base a bunch of grapes leaved proper (in layman's terms: a silver shield displaying, from top to bottom, two discs divided into wavy white and blue stripes, a red chevron, and a bunch of grapes). The crest was a parson-crow, and the motto Non auro sed virtute. Together the crow (kraai) and the fountains (fonteine) were a pun on the name of the town.

== Notable residents ==
- Adrian Jacobs, rugby union player
- Cheslin Kolbe, rugby union player, 2019 and 2023 World Cup winner
- Dann-Jacques Mouton, actor
- Carmen Solomons, model
- Wayde Van Niekerk, track and field sprinter, current world and Olympic record holder, and Olympic champion
