= Daryne Joshua =

South African filmmaker

- Born: Daryne Joshua; Cape Town, South Africa
- Education: Livingstone High School
- Alma mater: AFDA, The School for the Creative Economy
- Occupations: Director, producer, writer
- Years active: 2010–present
- Awards: SAFTA Best Achievement in Directing: Feature Film

Daryne Joshua (born 1980) is a South African filmmaker. He is best known as the director of critically acclaimed films Noem My Skollie and Ellen: Die storie van Ellen Pakkies. Apart from filmmaking, he is also a philanthropist, editor, animation designer, sound designer, media and communication director.

== Personal life ==
He was born and raised in Cape Town. He was educated at Livingstone High School. He is a lecturer on Cinema and Film Studies at Cape Peninsula, University of Technology.

== Career ==
At the age of seven, he started visual storytelling. At that time, he made and sold comics to his friends in Bridgetown. He later attended to AFDA, The School for the Creative Economy and obtained the degree with distinction.

He is the co-founder, writer and director of Gambit Films which he formed right after graduation. Gambit Films produced Cape Town’s first Afrikaans soap opera, Suidooster for DSTV and Kyknet.

In 2016, he directed his debut film Noem My Skollie. The film was selected as the South African entry for the Best Foreign Language Film at the 89th Academy Awards. The film won the RapidLion Awards for Best Screenplay and Best South African Film in 2017. With the success of the film, he made his second feature film Ellen: Die storie van Ellen Pakkies. It was based on the true story of Ellen Pakkies. The film has its world premiere at International Film Festival Rotterdam (IFFR) on 27 January 2018 and received critical acclaim. It was released in South Africa on 7 September 2018.

In 2018, he wrote the script of short film Number 37 directed by Nosipho Dumisa. The script later won South African Film and Television Award (SAFTA) award as well.

== Filmography ==
Year	Film	Role	Genre	Ref.
2010	Lost Boys: The Thirst	Staff assistant	Home video	
2016	Noem My Skollie (Call Me Thief)	Director	Film	
2018	Ellen: Die storie van Ellen Pakkies	Director	Film	
2018	Number 37	Writer, script	Short films	
2020	Blood & Water	Director, writer	TV series	
