= Seriously Single Too =

2026 South African film

- Directed by: Katleho Ramaphakela; Rethabile Ramaphakela
- Produced by: Rethabile Ramaphakela; Katleho Ramaphakela; Tshepo Ramaphakela
- Starring: Fulu Mugovhani; Tumi Morake; Buntu Petse; Keke Mphuthi; Yonda Thomas; Thabiso Rammusi; Motlatsi Mafatshe; Harriet Manamela
- Production company: Burnt Onion Productions
- Distributed by: Netflix
- Release date: 16 October 2026
- Country: South Africa
- Language: English

Seriously Single Too is a South African romantic comedy film produced by Burnt Onion Productions. It is related to Seriously Single. The film stars Fulu Mugovhani, Tumi Morake, Yonda Thomas, Buntu Petse, Keke Mphuthi, Thabiso Rammusi, Motlatsi Mafatshe and Harriet Manamela premiered globally on Netflix on 16 October 2026.

== Premise ==
The film follows longtime best friends Dineo and Noni as their plans to dominate the local party scene are disrupted by a sudden marriage proposal. Dineo subsequently organizes a chaotic bachelorette trip to Cape Town that tests the limits of their friendship.

== Cast ==
- Fulu Mugovhani as Dineo
- Tumi Morake as Noni
- Buntu Petse as Sasa
- Keke Mphuthi as Bontle
- Yonda Thomas as Max
- Thabiso Rammusi as Khai
- Motlatsi Mafatshe as Lefa
- Harriet Manamela as Aunt Gontse
- Emmanuel Castis as Captain JP
- Casey B. Dolan as Karen
- Theodore Jantjies as DJ Quinton
- Afrika Similo Mdutyulwa as Club MC
- Phila Mazibuko as Lawrence
- Banele Ndaba as Bowling Alley Employee
- Julian Witbooi as Sommelier
- Avi Elman as UPZ
- Olwelthu Mlotshwa as Ms Party
- Nomvelo Makhanya plays DJ Nomvelo

== Production ==
Seriously Single Too was produced by the South African company Burnt Onion Productions, run by siblings Rethabile, Katlego and Tshepo Ramaphakela, who also served as executive producers. The film was directed by Rethabile and Katlego Ramaphaela. The film took place in Johannesburg and Cape Town, South Africa, to capture the storyline's central bachelorette trip.

== Release ==
The film premiered on Netflix on 16 October 2026.
