= How to Ruin Diwali =

South African comedy drama television series

- Genre: Comedy drama
- Created by: Rethabile Ramaphakela
- Written by: Rethabile Ramaphakela; Katleho Ramaphakela
- Starring: Rosemary Zimu; Kyle Clark; Jailoshini Naidoo; Koobeshen Naidoo; Sonia Mbele; Meshack Mavuso; Luthando Mthembu; Denise Zimba; Ashish Gangapersad
- Country of origin: South Africa
- No. of seasons: 1
- No. of episodes: 3

Production
- Executive producers: Rethabile Ramaphakela; Katleho Ramaphakela; Tshepo Ramaphakela
- Producers: Burnt Onion Productions; Urban Vision Productions
- Camera setup: Multi-camera

Original release
- Network: Netflix
- Release: 30 October 2026

Related
- How to Ruin Christmas; How to Ruin Love: The Proposal

How to Ruin Diwali (also known as How to Ruin Diwali: Meet the Parents) is a South African romantic comedy television series created by Rethabile Ramaphakela airing in Netflix. The series is produced by Burnt Onion Productions in collaboration with Jayan Moodley and Urban Vision Productions. It serves as the "How to Ruin" franchise, following How to Ruin Christmas and How to Ruin Love: The Proposal. The series stars Rosemary Zimu, Kyle Clark, Jailoshini Naidoo, and Koobeshen Naidoo, Sonia Mbele, Meshack Mavuso and premiered globally on Netflix on 30 October 2026.

== Premise ==
How to Ruin Diwali: Meet the Parents follows Mmabatho Nkomo as she attempts to impress her fiancé's traditional Indian family during chaotic Diwali preparations. Cultural clashes and comedic misunderstandings ultimately threaten to derail the festive celebrations.

== Cast ==
- Rosemary Zimu as Mmabatho Nkomo
- Kyle Clark
- Jailoshini Naidoo as Tarina
- Koobeshen Naidoo as Sharm
- Sonia Mbele
- Meshack Mavuso
- Luthando Mthembu
- Denise Zimba
- Ashish Gangapersad

== Production ==
The development of How to Ruin Diwali: Meet the Parents was announced by Netflix in September 2026. The series is produced as a joint venture between Burnt Onion Productions and Urban Vision Production. The project brings together franchise creator Rethabile Ramaphakela and filmmaker Jayan Moodley.

== Release ==
The series premiered on Netflix on 30 October 2026.
