= Tiffany Barbuzano =

South African actress

- Born: Tiffany Jones; South Africa
- Education: University of the Witwatersrand
- Occupations: Actress, writer, producer
- Years active: 2005–present
- Spouse: Johnny Barbuzano
- Children: 2

Tiffany Jones Barbuzano is a South African actress.

== Personal life ==
She obtained a BA Dramatic Arts degree from University of the Witwatersrand. She also completed a diploma in film at the National School of the Arts.

== Career ==
In 2010, she starred the role 'Danny Gibson' in the e.tv drama series 4 Play: Sex Tips for Girls. She continued to play the role until 2012. In 2013, she won the SAFTA Golden Horn award for the Best Actress for the serial 4Play: Sex Tips for Girls. From 2006 to 2007, she played the role as 'Gabrielle' on the comedy-drama series Izoso Connexion aired on SABC1. The serial was created by her husband Johnny Barbuzano. In 2016, she nominated for the SAFTA Golden Horn Award for Best Achievement in Scriptwriting for her 2014 script Kota Life Crisis.

The other shows that thrust her in the limelight are Sober Companion (2016), Seriously Single (2020) and Still Breathing (2020). He co-founded the film production company 'Localala Productions'. She involved in many theater productions such as Six Inches and Shakers, Macbeth, Othello and A Midsummer Night Dream.

Tiffany then joined with the theater show Impromptu Zoo, which was performed at the Sandton Theatre's Square. She also featured in several TV series such as Quickies, Snitch, Man to Man, Uncle Max, and Binnelanders. Apart from acting, she became a scriptwriter, for several television shows: Izoso Connexion, Isidingo and Scandal as well as script for the M-Net's drama series. In 2015, she appeared in the BBC drama series Wild at Heart. In 2017, she won the SAFTA Golden Horn Award for the Best Actress for her role in the television serial Sober Companion.

In early 2020, she was nominated by SAFTA Golden Horn for the Best Achievement in Scriptwriting for the script of Lockdown. In August 2020, she starred in the sex comedy film Seriously Single co-directed by Katleho Ramaphakela and Rethabile Ramaphakela. It was released on 31 July 2020, on Netflix.

== Filmography ==
| Year | Film | Role | Genre | Ref. |
|---|---|---|---|---|
| 2006 | Uncle Max | Max's Love | TV series | |
| 2006 | Izoso Connexion | Gabriella | TV series | |
| 2010 | 4Play: Sex Tips for Girls | Danny Gibson | TV series | |
| 2010 | Wild at Heart | Bethany | TV series | |
| 2012 | Shotgun Garfunkel | Actress: Pippa, writer, producer | Film | |
| 2014 | Welcome to Hawaii | Mel | Short film | |
| 2015 | Lazy Susan | Ms. Small-Pricked Tosser | Short film | |
| 2016 | My Story | Narrator | TV mini-series | |
| 2016 | Sober Companion | Grace, writer | TV series | |
| 2017 | Heart Aka 4 Minutes | Grace Sklaar | Short film | |
| 2017 | Taryn & Sharon | Jeanine | TV series | |
| 2018 | Die Vlieënde Springbokkie | Writer | TV series | |
| 2020 | Still Breathing 2020: BBZEE Films | Jessica, writer, producer | TV series | |
| 2020 | Still Breathing | Jessica, writer, producer | TV series | |
| 2020 | Housekeepers | Colonel Venter | TV series | |
| 2020 | Seriously Single | Pam | Film | |
