= Nambitha Ben-Mazwi =

South African actress (born 1988)

Nambitha Ben-Mazwi (born 1 December 1988) is a South African actress, television presenter, radio host and entrepreneur. She is known for her roles in the international drama series King Shaka, Netflix film Happiness Ever After, alongside Renate Stuurman, Xolile Tshabalala, Khanyi Mbau and Rami Chuene and South African television series such as The Queen and Scandal!

== Personal life ==
Nambitha Ben-Mazwi was born on 1 December 1988 in Port Elizabeth, South Africa. She attended Collegiate Girls' High School before earning an Honours degree in Business Science from the University of Cape Town (UCT).

== Career ==
=== As a businesswoman ===
Ben-Mazwi founded the media company NambithaBM Media.

=== As a brand ambassador ===
She has served as a Global Citizen Ambassador,a United Nations Equal Education Ambassador and a Brand South Africa Ambassador. In 2020, she appeared in Beyonce 's visual album Black is King.

=== As a TV host ===
Ben-Mazwi served as an MC during the 2010 FIFA World Cup and co-hosted the BrightRock Players Choice Awards in 2021 on SuperSport Channels 201 and 211.

=== As an actress ===
Ben-Mazwi is related to the late Winston Ntshona, a South African theatre performer, playwright, actor and Tony Award winner whom she has cited as an early influence on her interest in the arts. She joined the Eastern Cape Children's Choir at age 12 and performed in several musical and theatrical productions.

Her television debut role was while she was a student at the University of Cape Town, in the television series Doubt, where she played the role of Unathi Mweli. She later appeared in Diamond City, Scandal!, Broken Vows and the Netflix anthology series Black Mirror.

In 2022, she starred in a South African television series Savage Beauty as Linda Bhengu. Her performance earned her recognition, including the Global NFTSA Award for Best Actress for her roles in Savage Beauty and Empini. Prior to this she appeared in Madiba (2017), Scandal! (2017), Diamond City (2018–2019), How to Ruin Christmas (2020), Dead Places (2021), Happiness Ever After (2021) and The Estate (2021).

== Filmography ==
Year	Title	Role	Type	Ref
2016	Black Mirror	Nambitha Ben-Wazi	Television Series	
2017	Madiba	Nambitha Ben-Wazi	MiniSeries	
2017	Scandal!	Shado	Television Series	
2018–2019	Diamond City	Benathi	Television Series	
2020	How To Ruin Christmas	Refiloe	Television Series	
2020	The Queen	Shaueesha	Television Series	
2021	Dead Places	Angela	Television Series	
2021	Happiness Ever After	Zimkitha	Film	
2021	The Estate	Gigi Thethani	Television Series	
2022–2024	Savage Beauty	Linda Bhengu	Television Series	
2024–2025	Empini	Ndoni Themba	Television Series	

=== Theatre works ===
- Cinderella
- Cabaret
- The Promise
- Gilbert & Sullivan Memoirs
- The King and I
- The Mikado
- The Way

== Awards and recognition ==
- Glamour Woman of the Year (2016)
- Woman of Wonder (2020)
- Global Visionary Award – Woman of Wonder (2023)
- Received the Industry ICON recognition – Academy Oscars (2024)
- Most Stylish Performing Artist in Film or Television – SA Style Awards (2024)
- Hot Chick of the Year: Feathers Awards (2024)
- Actress of the Year: VN Global Awards (won)
- Best Actress (Savage Beauty and Empini) – National Film and Television Awards (2024)
