= Craig Jackson =

Craig Jackson may refer to:

- Craig Jackson (journalist) (fl. 2000s), host of the VH1 reality television series I Love Money
- Craig Jackson (field hockey) (born 1974), South African field hockey player
- Craig Jackson (swimmer) (born 1968), South African swimmer
- Craig Jackson (actor), (born 1979), South African actor
