= Lehoko =

Lehoko is a surname, occurring in South Africa. Notable people with the surname include:

- Mojak Lehoko, South African actor, stand-up comedian and scriptwriter
- Simon Lehoko (1951–2025), South African soccer player
