= Sma Mathibeli =

South African actress and radio personality

- Born: Smangele Mbatha; 1982 (age 43–44); Soweto, South Africa
- Occupations: Actress, Radio personality, Businesswoman
- Years active: 2000–present
- Spouse: Calvin Mathibeli (m. 2014)
- Website: https://smamathibeli.co.za

Smangele Mathibeli (nee Mbatha) is a South African actress and radio personality. She was born in KwaZulu Natal South Africa in 1982. She is best known for the roles in the television serials such as; Imbewu, Yizo Yizo and Zone 14. She is the CEO of the Calvin and Family Group.

== Personal life ==
Mbatha was born in 1982 in Soweto, Diepkloof, South Africa. She matriculated from high school in 1999. Then she enrolled for a degree in art management and audiovisual communication from University.

She is married to Calvin Mathibeli, a businessman. They married in a private wedding ceremony, in of Phuthaditjhaba, Qwaqwa celebrated in December 2014.

== Career ==
During her studies at the university, she trained at The Market Theatre Laboratory and The Institute of African Theatre where she performed in many theatre productions such as; The Devil's Protest and The Toilet. Meanwhile, she also worked with theatre organizations and companies such as the Positive Art Society and the Youth Drama Society.

In 2002, she made her television debut with SABC1 education series Gaz'lam with a minor role of "Foxy's Friend". Then in 2003, she joined with the third season of SABC1 drama series Yizo Yizo and played the role "Nomsa". For this role, she received a Special Mention Award at the 2004 Venice Film Festival's Human Rights Film Network Awards. In 2005, she played the role "Madi" in the second season of SABC1 drama Zone 14. She continued to play the role with popularity in following three seasons. In the meantime in 2006, she appeared in the Heartlines: The Good Fight with the role "Faith". In 2012 she joined with the cast of the e.tv soap opera Scandal! and played the role of "Nomcebo". In 2019, she joined with the regular cast of second season of e.tv soap opera Imbewu and played the role "Abigail Miya" until the fourth season up to date.

After moving to Durban, she started her radio career as a content producer on many radio stations in KwaZulu-Natal, such as Ukhozi FM and Gagasi 99.5 FM and worked until 2016. During this period, she also won the MTN radio award. Since 2016, she became a businesswoman as the CEO of the Calvin and Family Group established with her husband. The company received many accolades such as; including Forbes Top30 Most Promising Entrepreneurs in Africa, and the National Entrepreneur Champions in NBC South Africa.

== Filmography ==
Year	Film	Role	Genre	Ref.
2002	Gaz'lam	Foxy's Friend	TV series	
2003	Yizo Yizo	Nomsa	TV series	
2005	Zone 14	Madi	TV series	
2006	Heartlines: The Good Fight	Faith	TV series	
2012	Scandal!	Nomcebo	TV series	
2019	Imbewu	Abigail Miya	TV series	
