= Garth Erasmus =

South African artist

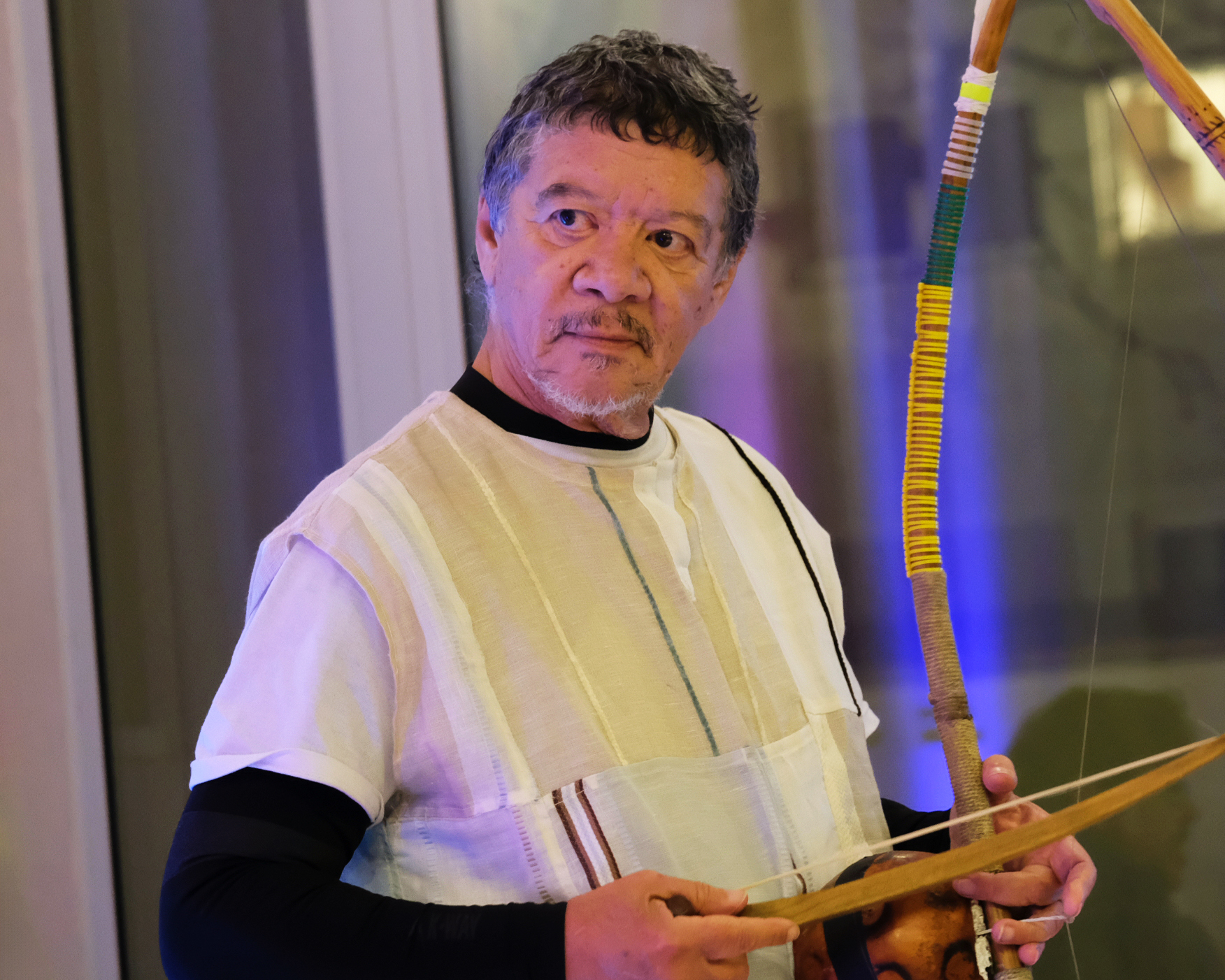
- Garth Erasmus (2025)
- Born: April 12, 1956 (age 70); Eastern Cape, South Africa
- Alma mater: Rhodes University

Garth Erasmus (born April 12, 1956, in Uitenhage, Eastern Cape, South Africa) is a South African artist who works in several media, including painting.

== Early life and education ==
He attended Paterson High School in Port Elizabeth and later attended a teachers training program at Hewat Training College in Cape Town. He later attended Rhodes University, and founded the community artists organization Vakalisa Arts Associates in the Cape. He was a participant in the Thupelo Workshop program during the 1980s.

== Career ==
Erasmus' work is represented in several art collections, including the National Museum of African Art and the Smithsonian Institution. Among other formats Erasmus is known for his Resistance Art protesting the apartheid regime in South Africa. Beginning as graffiti protest art his State of Emergency series depicts images of entrapment. Writing in a review of the Smithsonian's National Museum of African Arts 2002 exhibition "Encounters With the Contemporary," critic Mark D'Amato called Erasmus' painting The Muse 3 (1995) "a highlight." Erasmus' work uses his archival research to approach his Khoisan lineage, and drawing on figures from Khoisan cosmology. Erasmus has "employed Afrikaans text to comment on the brutal Khoisan history and its impact on present descendants, opening a window onto the way this history has been repressed."

He has also provided illustrations for numerous books, including Nape 'a Motana's book of proverbs, published in 2004, as well as a volume of conversations with figures from Cape Town's District 6.

== Sources ==
- 10 Years 100 Artists: Art in a Democratic South Africa, edited by Sophie Perryer, 2004, Bell-Roberts Publishing, Cape Town.
- Adams, Keith, and Garth Erasmus. Memory Keepers. Betty's Bay [South Africa: Backbooks Publishers, 2012. Print.
- Erasmus, Garth, Siemon Allen, and Julie L. McGee. Resoundings: Garth Erasmus & Siemon Allen, 2015. Print.
- Motana, Nape'a, and Garth Erasmus. Sepedi (northern Sotho) Proverbs. Cape Town: Kwela, 2004. Print.
