= The Lucky Specials =

2017 South African romantic musical drama film

- Directed by: Reabetswe Rangaka
- Written by: Nonzi Bogatsu; Tim Greene
- Story by: Lungelo Mdlalose; Tim Greene
- Produced by: Harriet Gavshon; Peter Gudo; Aric Noboa; J.P. Potgieter
- Starring: Oros Mampofu; Sivenathi Mabuya; Blondia Makhene; Richard Lukunku; Fulu Mugovhani
- Cinematography: Tom Marais
- Edited by: Melanie Jankes Golden
- Music by: Brendan Jury
- Production companies: HHMI Tangled Bank Studios; Quizzical Pictures; Nigma Pictures
- Distributed by: AAA Entertainment
- Release date: 17 February 2017
- Running time: 108 minutes
- Country: South Africa
- Language: English

The Lucky Specials is a 2017 South African musical romantic drama film directed by Reabetswe Rangaka and co-produced by Harriet Gavshon, Peter Gudo, Aric Noboa, and J.P. Potgieter for Discovery Learning Alliance and Quizzical Pictures in association with HHMI Tangled Bank Studios. The film stars Oros Mampofu and Sivenathi Mabuya with Blondia Makhene, Richard Lukunku, and Fulu Mugovhani in supporting roles. The film is about a cover band called "The Lucky Specials" in a dusty town in southern Africa where Mandla, a miner by profession plays lead guitar but later problems arise with Nkanyiso, a fellow band member.

The film has been shot in and around South Africa and Mozambique.

== Reception ==
The film premiered on 17 February 2017 at MonteCasino in Johannesburg, South Africa. The film received positive reviews from critics and selected for 12 international film festivals. The film also won Special Jury Recognition at the 2012 Pan African Film Festival and was honored with the Zuku Award for Best African Film at the 2012 Zanzibar International Film Festival. In 2018 at the Africa Movie Academy Awards, the film was nominated for five awards: Best Actress in a leading role, Best Actor in a leading role, Best Actor in a supporting role, Best Visual Effects and Best Editing. Meanwhile, in the same year, the film was nominated for the Best Made for TV Movie at the Golden Horn Awards. It was screened throughout the world in helping communities respond to tuberculosis.

== Cast ==
- Oros Mampofu as Mandla
- Sivenathi Mabuya as Nkanyiso
- Blondie Makhene as Bra Easy
- Richard Lukunku as Jose
- Thomas Gumede as Sello
- Fulu Mugovhani as Zwanga
- Linda Sebezo as businesswoman
