= Sandy Mokwena =

South African actor (1949–2018)

- Born: Sandy Mokwena; 26 June 1949; Soweto, South Africa
- Died: 25 January 2018 (aged 68); Johannesburg, South Africa
- Resting place: Heroes Acre in West Park Cemetery
- Occupation: Actor
- Years active: 1972–2018

Sandy Mokwena (26 June 1949 – 25 January 2018) was a South African actor. He is best known for his roles in the popular serials Funeral for an Assassin, Tödliche Geschäfte and Scandal!.

== Personal life ==
He was born on 26 June 1949 in Soweto, South Africa. He was married to Grace Mokwena. The couple had 4 kids, 3 daughters Ditshego, Keabetswe, Lebogang and 1 son Otsile Itumeleng.

He died on 25 January 2018 in the morning of natural causes at the age of 68. The funeral service was held at the Grace Bible Church in Soweto on 26 January 2018. He was then buried at Heroes Acre in West Park Cemetery, Johannesburg.

== Career ==
In 1972, he performed in the stage play Iphi Ntombi with the role 'Cappie'. With the play, he toured internationally and continued to play the role until 1984. and then in the television series Going Up.

In 2005, he was selected for the role 'Bra Eddie Khumalo' in the television soap opera Scandal!. The show became highly popular where Sandy continued to play the role until his death in 2018. A memorial service was held at the Scandal! studios in honour of the 13 years he spent on the soapie. Mokwena also played the role of 'Ken Mokoena' in the drama series Yizo Yizo 1.

Apart from Scandal!, he contributed many television productions such as Generations, Khululeka, Soul City, Justice for All and Zero Tolerance. Meanwhile, he worked in the films: Taxi to Soweto (1992), The Principal (1996), Dead End (1999) and Scarback (2000).

== Filmography ==
Year	Film	Role	Genre	Ref.
1982	Ipi-Tombi	Sandy	TV movie	
1991	Taxi to Soweto	Polite	Film	
1991	Tödliche Geschäfte	Spokes	Film	
1994	Torings	Harry Mopeli	TV series	
1998	Tierärztin Christine III: Abenteuer in Südafrika		TV movie	
1999	Africa	Police Officer	Film	
2002	Ietermagô	Bra Matshikiza	TV series	
2004	Plek van die Vleisvreters	Samson Ngobeni	TV series	
2005–2018	Scandal!	Eddie	TV series	
2011	Winnie Mandela	Black Bishop	Film	
