= HHMI Tangled Bank Studios =

American film studio

HHMI Tangled Bank Studios is a film studio founded in 2012 by the Howard Hughes Medical Institute.

The studio works with filmmakers to create films about science for broadcast, theatrical and digital distribution. The studio's films focus primarily on the life sciences, and are centered around four main themes: Pioneers of Science, Frontiers in Medicine, The Health of Our Planet and Countering Denialism (films that present scientific evidence on topics such as evolution and vaccination).

== Filmography ==
Title	Year released	Distributor(s)
Your Inner Fish	2014	PBS
Vaccines: Calling the Shots	2014	PBS NOVA
Mass Extinction: Life at the Brink	2014	Smithsonian Channel
Spillover -- Zika, Ebola & Beyond	2016	PBS
Can Alzheimer's Be Stopped?	2016	PBS NOVA
The Lucky Specials	2017	Theatrical
I Contain Multitudes	2017	PBS Digital Studios
Second Genesis	2017	PBS/Digital Streaming
The Gene Doctors	2017	PBS
Amazon Adventure 3D	2017	IMAX/Giant Screen
The Farthest	2017	Abramorama
Backyard Wilderness 3D	2018	IMAX/Giant Screen
Inventing Tomorrow	2018	Theatrical/PBS POV
Our Gorongosa	2019	Theatrical
The Serengeti Rules	2019	PBS Nature
