= Fight Another Day =

- Official release poster
- Directed by: James Mark
- Written by: James Mark; Matthew K. Nayman
- Produced by: James Mark; Bruno Marino; Tony Del Rio
- Starring: Eric Johnson; Christina Ochoa; Matthew Willig; Ken Shamrock; Chuck Liddell; Michael Bisping; Ennis Esmer; Paul Braunstein; Melanie Leishman; Martin Kove; Jim Belushi
- Cinematography: Russ De Jong
- Edited by: James Mark
- Music by: Patrick O'Mara
- Production companies: Kemodo Entertainment; High Star Entertainment
- Distributed by: Red Hound Entertainment
- Release date: 3 December 2024
- Running time: 137
- Country: Canada
- Language: English

Fight Another Day is a 2024 Canadian science fiction action film directed by James Mark, written by James Mark and Matthew K. Nayman. It stars Eric Johnson, Martin Kove, Christina Ochoa, and Jim Belushi.

The plot follows officer Ryan Taylor who is plucked from the moment of his death and transported, with other combatants pulled from across history, to a dystopian future where they must fight to the death for entertainment on the titular television show Fight Another Day.

== Plot ==
1989: Officer Ryan is fatally shot while filming reality show "In the Name of Justice". As he lays dying, he sees Isabelle watching over him.

2067: Fischer's contemplation is interrupted by his assistant Cal, telling him they're ready. Fischer and Cal observe the arena from a control room. Ryan awakens in the arena with others, told to fight to the death, and is the only survivor of the ensuing brawl. Later Ryan wakes in a cell, Isabelle appears on a monitor, introduces herself as his handler, and explains his situation. Still unbelieving, Ryan is moved to a waiting room with other time displaced contestants. He is befriended by fellow American, the cowboy Colt. Colt explains: they are combatants chosen from throughout time, randomly pitted against each other, fighting to the death with period weapons and armor for viewers' entertainment. Verus announces the start of season 10 of "Live to Fight Another Day". Fischer kills a protesting contestant by detonating an implanted explosive device as a warning to the others.

The lottery picks Ryan to fight Arthur Dane. Ryan reluctantly selects a handgun and knife from equipment manager Duke. Gerrard and Isabelle watch the fight. Ryan battles Dane, who wears full armor and wields a sword. After a brutal fight, Ryan is bloodied but victorious. Isabelle confides in Ryan that she hopes he can stop Fischer, who controls society with the drug EQM and "Fight Another Day". Winning gains access to Fischer.

Ryan's popularity rises with each win. Fischer instructs Cal to rig the lottery, swapping in Ryan to fight a Spartan. Wearing riot gear, Ryan defeats the Spartan, earning Cal's cheers. Fischer arranges to meet Ryan.

Isabelle wants Ryan to kill Fischer, smuggling a scalpel into his cell. Meeting Fischer, Ryan learns his death inspired Fight Another Day which, combined with EQM, led to drastically lower crime rates. Fischer offers to reunite Ryan with his murdered son if he helps. Ryan leaves without killing Fischer, tempted by the offer.

Ryan continues winning. Duke warns against enjoying the bloodshed. Instead of killing his next opponent, Corporal Lewis, Ryan appeals directly to the audience. Cal asks if Ryan's implant should be detonated, but Fischer instead orders Lewis killed and Ryan returned to his cell. Fischer notes people like both the rise and fall of a hero.

Attempting to kill the troublesome Ryan, the only equipment offered for his next match against Sakura are sunglasses. Seeing Ryan unarmed, Sakura discards her weapons and armour to meet him unarmed as she wishes for an honourable death. Sakura outfights Ryan in hand-to-hand combat. Desperate, Ryan grabs one of Sakura's swords, and she likewise arms herself. Still outmatched, a final effort sees him ready the scalpel he has hidden from the earlier assassination plot. Sakura impales Ryan with a blade, but he gets close enough, holding the scalpel to her throat. Accepting her defeat, Sakura commits seppuku. Ryan, acting as her kaishakunin, beheads Sakura.

Isabelle's personal reason for hating Fischer is she lost her sister to EQM. She wears a bracelet in memory. They aim to stop Ryan's original televised death, to change the future. Ryan teams with Colt, Isabelle with Gerrard, and Duke helps. Sabotage causes a power cut, interrupting the Colt vs. Ryan final, aiding their plan to reach the time machine. Cal is frantic in the control room, while Fischer orders a commercial break.

Colt betrays the escape plan, to support Fischer's vision. Fischer arrives with guards and a captured Isabelle. Verus, feeling cheated, joins the revolt and kills Colt, allowing Ryan and Isabelle to run for the time machine. Fischer shoots at the fleeing Ryan, hitting Isabelle. Cal ignores Fischer's order to detonate Ryan's explosive, enraptured by the daring escape, declaring "This is the best season ever!".

Ryan travels back to the moment of his death, forewarned he incapacitates his killer, preventing the broadcast. The version of Isabelle who'd arrived to collect the deceased Ryan is confused by this future version's presence. Ryan presents her sister's bracelet, convincing Isabelle that her plan to defeat Fischer has succeeded, and they drive away into the night.

== Cast ==
- Eric Johnson as Ryan Taylor: A Police officer and star of a 1980's reality TV show, "In the Name of Justice", involving cameras following him as he arrests violent criminals. His six-year-old son was murdered.
- Martin Kove as Fischer: The powerful owner of Chronocom, a conglomerate that controls the media and pushes the powerful drug EQM which keeps the general populace sedated. He personally oversees the show.
- Christina Ochoa as Isabelle: She works for Chronocom as a handler, a guide for the combatants on the show. She is Ryan's handler and has specially selected him in hopes he can help end Fischer and Chronocom.
- Jim Belushi as Duke: A former police officer, now an equipment manager on the show. He provides a selection of contemporary weapons and armour used in the combat matches.
- Paul Braunstein as Colt: A combatant on the show and self described "fastest gun in the west". He's a cowboy skilled with the revolver and lasso. He has a friendly, folksy disposition and quickly befriends Ryan.
- Matthew Willig as Verus: A former champion of the games, he now acts as hype-man for the show.
- Melanie Leishman as Cal: Fischer's assistant. She does her best to see things run smoothly on the show, aware of the need to pander to Fischer's ego. She is invested in the events of the show, sometimes getting carried away with them.
- Elina Miyake Jackson as Ishida Sakura: A female Japanese warrior. She has grown tired of killing and wishes to die honourably in battle.
- Nicolas Grimes as Halvor: A Viking that fights with shield and bearded axe.
- Ennis Esmer as Gerrard: Another handler on the show, Arthur Dane is initially one of his responsibilities.
- Louis Paquette as Daxos: A Spartan warrior, he fights with spear and shield.
- Mustafa Bulut as Al Razi
- Michael Bisping as Arthur Dane: An English knight, he fights in armour and close helmet and wields a sword as a combatant on the show.
- Darryl Quon as Bataar Ganbold: A Mongol warrior and combatant on the show, he uses a bow and blade.
- Finn Higgins as Blaine Arzure: A Celt who fights bare chested with blue war-paint, using a sword and dagger as one of the combatants.
- Chuck Liddell as Barbarian
- Ken Shamrock as Gladiator
- Jackson Rozario as Luchador
- Deanna Jarvis as Lisa
- Anita Nittoly as Sandy Lewis: A Canadian soldier and combatant on the show.

== Production ==
The independent production was produced by Bruno Marino of High Star Entertainment and James Mark of Kemodo Entertainment with international sales handled by WTFilms.

=== Conception ===
Writer/Director James Mark's influence for the film came from his background in stunt work and love of action movies, with the time travel aspect being used to allow for the inclusion of as many different fighters as possible onscreen.

=== Filming ===
Principal photography took place in the Greater Toronto Area from November and December 2022 through to early 2023, with some scenes being shot at Nuvo Network studios in Burlington. Scenes were also shot at a building in Hamilton, on Charlton Avenue East close to St. Joseph's Hospital.

== Release ==
The film was premiered on 9 October 2024 in Stockholm, Sweden at the Monsters of Film festival. Released on streaming in Canada and the United States on the 3 December 2024. The film was released on DVD and Blu-Ray in Germany on 13 February 2025.
