= Bohang Moeko =

South African actor (born 1988)

- Born: Bohang Moeko; 13 April 1988 (age 38); Soweto, South Africa
- Education: University of the Free State
- Occupations: Actor, model
- Years active: 2016–present
- Height: 1.75 m (5 ft 9 in)

Bohang Moeko (born 13 April 1988) is a South African actor. He is best known for the roles in the films and television series: Seriously Single, The Hot Zone and Housekeepers.

== Personal life ==
He was born on 13 April 1988 in Protea North, Soweto. His father worked in construction. He graduated with an honors degree in quantity surveying at the University of the Free State. after graduation, he moved to Durban and settled and worked for two years.

He started dating Shantal Dietrich, a fitness coach since 2018. They got engaged in July 2020.

== Career ==
He moved to Johannesburg to study acting. During this period, he made his first act on Zabalaza in 2013 with the role 'Victor'. Since then, he acted in many films and television serials such as Ring of Lies, Side Dish, Isithunzi, Housekeepers, Scandal, Isidingo, The Hot Zone, and The Queen. Meanwhile, he moved to modeling career where he became a finalist in the 2013 Mr South Africa competition.

He also appeared on #Karektas as 'Celebrity Guest' and then on Housekeepers as 'Kabelo' in 2018. In 2019, he made his first international role in a short series The Hot Zone. In August 2020, he starred in the sex comedy film Seriously Single co-directed by Katleho Ramaphakela and Rethabile Ramaphakela. It was released on 31 July 2020 on Netflix.

== Filmography ==
Year	Film	Role	Genre	Ref.
2016	Ring of Lies	Kabelo	TV series	
2017	Is'Thunzi	Lebone Mabuela	TV series	
2017	Scandal!	Tshepo	TV series	
2018	SideDish	Richard	TV mini-series	
2018	Housekeepers	Thabang	TV series	
2018	iDrive	Zakhele AKA 'Zakes'	TV series	
2019	Isidingo: The Need	Mojalefa Matabane	TV series	
2019	TheQueen	Trevor	TV series	
2019	The Hot Zone	Dr. Musoke	TV mini-series	
2020	Seriously Single	Lunga	Film	
2021	Isono	Gabriel Ndlovu	TV Series	
2023	Grown Woman	Thato	TV Series	
