= Hijack Stories =

2000 film

- Directed by: Oliver Schmitz
- Written by: Oliver Schmitz; Lesego Rampolokeng
- Produced by: Philippe Guez; Christoph Hahnheiser
- Starring: Tony Kgoroge
- Cinematography: Michel Amathieu
- Edited by: Oliver Schmitz; Derek Trigg
- Music by: Martin Todsharow
- Release date: 10 September 2000
- Running time: 94 minutes
- Country: South Africa
- Language: English

Hijack Stories is a 2000 South African crime film directed by Oliver Schmitz. It was screened in the Un Certain Regard section at the 2001 Cannes Film Festival.

== Cast ==
- Tony Kgoroge as Sox Moraka
- Rapulana Seiphemo as Zama
- Percy Matsemela as Fly
- Makhaola Ndebele as Joe
- Moshidi Motshegwa as Grace
- Emily McArthur as Nicky
- Owen Sejake as Bra Dan
- Harold 'Speedy' Matihabo as Kenneth
- George Lamola as Steve
- Robert Whitehead as Casting Director
- Molemo Maarohanye as Bar youth
- Nimrod Nkosi as Bar youth
- Shane Maja as Bar youth
- Tumisho Masha as Bar youth
- Arthur Molepo as Brixton cop #1
- Carl Beukes as Brixton cop #2
