= Luthuli Dlamini =

Zimbabwean-born South African actor

- Born: 13 March 1966 (age 60); Bulawayo, Zimbabwe
- Occupations: actor; Producer
- Years active: 1986–present
- Children: 5

Luthuli Dlamini (born 13 March 1966) is a Zimbabwe-born South African film and television actor. He is best known for his portrayal of Stan Nyathi on the e.tv soap opera, Scandal!. Dlamini has also had roles on Generations, Jacob's Cross, InterSEXions, Rockville, Room, Tempy Pushas, and Uzalo.

== Early life ==
Dlamini was born on 13 March 1966 in Bulawayo, Zimbabwe. He grew up in England spending his time between that country and his native Zimbabwe. "I was born in Zimbabwe in the late '60s and moved between Africa and Europe most of my life. I lived all the way through the Beatles craze of the UK and the liberation movement of Zimbabwe.

England was fun but I felt like a foreigner and I always wanted to come back home," he remarked during a Drum magazine interview.

— "Luthuli Dlamini", Incwajana

== Career ==
From 2008-2009, He has played the leading role of Tombo Mbuli in the M-Net sitcom The Coconuts. On 4 July 2013, he joined Generations, television show that was aired live on SABC 1, playing a role of Scott. He also had played the role of Advocate Zulu on Uzalo from season 1 to season 4.

== Scandal! controversy ==
Dlamini initially notified the producers of Scandal! on 4 June 2007 that he had been ill and needed some time off. After a prolonged absence and no news from him, the producers of that show tried to reach him to no success, at which point they went to his house where they found that the house appeared to be uninhabited. After two weeks of no news from him, the police were notified and they discovered that he had been inside his house. He claimed that he had been sick and needed time to recuperate. On 28 June 2007, he was dismissed from Scandal! but later returned on a recurring basis to see out his character of Stan Nyathi.

== Filmography ==
=== Television ===
Year	Film	Role	Notes
2013	Generations	Scott Nomvete	
2013	Intersexions	Zakes	
2011-2013	Scandal!'	Stan Nyathi	
2015	Tempy Pushas	Ben Landers	
2018	Uzalo	Advocate Zulu	
2024	Umkhwenyana	Mr. Mawela	

=== Films ===
Year	Title	Role	Notes
2010	The lost future	Lars	
2010	Im Brautkleid durch Afrika		
2013	Chander Pahar		
2016	Mandela's Gun	Walter Sisulu	
2016	Cry of love	Larry	
2016	The Journey is the Destination	Mr. Hirabe	
2016	Jongo	Noah	
2016	Naked Reality	Peot	
2019	The Furnace	Coffin	
2021	Dead Places	Jacob	
2021	Alleyway	President	
2022	Office Invasion	Moses	
2023	Red Cargo	RSA Minister	

== Achievements ==
=== Nice International Film Festival ===
Year	Nominated Work	Category	Result	Ref
2019	Himself	Best Actor	Won	
