= Elina Miyake Jackson =

Canadian actress

- 三宅 エリナ
- Born: Okayama, Okayama Prefecture, Japan
- Other name: Elina Miyake
- Occupation: Actress
- Height: 1.68 m (5 ft 6 in)
- Website: www.elinamiyake.com

Elina Miyake Jackson, also known as Elina Miyake (三宅 エリナ, Miyake Elina), is a Japanese-Canadian actress.

She was nominated for Best Actress at the Calgary Independent Film Festival for her role in the Soul Sucker chapter of the horror anthology film Creepy Bits released in 2021. Additionally, she has been cast alongside James Belushi and Martin Kove in the upcoming action film "Fight Another Day."

== Early life ==
Originating from Okayama, Japan, she developed an interest in Arnold Schwarzenegger at the age of 9, inspired by watching "Terminator 2." This experience played a significant role in shaping her aspirations to pursue a career as an international actress. Following her high school graduation, she undertook a solo journey to Canada in 2012 with only 80,000 yen (approximately US$800 at the time) and little proficiency in English.

== Filmography ==
=== Film & Television ===
- Creepy Bits (CBC, Bloody Disgusting TV (2021 to Present) as Lina Bishop
- Fight Another Day (2024) as Sakura Ishida
- Age of Samurai: Battle for Japan (Netflix, February 24, 2021 - ) as Lady Nene
- The Invisibles

=== Variety Show ===
- Mirun e Come on! Nanshon? (OHK, November 7, 2023 - )

=== Radio ===
- Kagayaku Okayama Yume Girl (RadioMOMO, December 2, 2023)
- Fresh Morning OKAYAMA (FM OKAYAMA, January 11, 2024)
