= The Invisibles (2024 film) =

- Directed by: Andrew Currie
- Written by: Andrew Currie; Colin Aussant
- Produced by: Lee Kim; Mary Anne Waterhouse
- Starring: Tim Blake Nelson; Gretchen Mol; Bruce Greenwood
- Cinematography: Maya Bankovic
- Edited by: Stephen Roque
- Music by: Todor Kobakov
- Production companies: Quadrant Motion Pictures; Resolute Films
- Distributed by: Levelfilm
- Release date: March 10, 2024 (Cinequest)
- Running time: 107 minutes
- Country: Canada
- Language: English

The Invisibles is a 2024 Canadian science fiction film, written and directed by Andrew Currie. The film stars Tim Blake Nelson as Charlie, a man who is navigating the end of his relationship with Hanna (Gretchen Mol) when he begins to physically disappear, discovering a hidden world of other people who have become invisible.

The cast also includes Bruce Greenwood, Simon Webster, Rachel Wilson, Tennille Read, Laura de Carteret, Juno Rinaldi, Courtenay J. Stevens, Rob Ramsay, Vinson Tran, Golden Madison, Jean-Michel Le Gal, Tal Gottfried, Elina Miyake Jackson, Nathan Alexis, Philip Van Martin and Grace Loewen in supporting roles.

The film was first announced in 2021, with Lucy Liu slated to appear in the cast. It went into production in Toronto and Hamilton in 2023, with Mol replacing Liu at that time.

The film premiered in March 2024 at the Cinequest Film & Creativity Festival, and had its Canadian premiere as the opening gala at the 2024 Cinéfest Sudbury International Film Festival.
