= Stephen Turnbull (historian) =

British historian of Japan (b. 1948)

Stephen Richard Turnbull
- Born: Stephen Richard Turnbull; February 1948 (age 78); United Kingdom
- Education: University of Cambridge, University of Leeds (Philosophiæ doctor) (1996)
- Occupations: Writer, military historian, researcher, narrator
- Writing career
- Language: English

Stephen Richard Turnbull (born 6 February 1948) is a British historian concentrating on Japanese military history, especially the samurai period, and has published numerous books. He has worked as a historical consultant for the film 47 Ronin, as well multiple television documentaries, and the Shogun: Total War series of video games.

== Biography ==
Turnbull attended Cambridge University where he gained his first degree. He holds 2 MAs in Theology and Military History and a PhD for his research on Kakure Kirishitan from the University of Leeds, where he is presently a lecturer in Far Eastern Religions, in a program of study jointly overseen by both the Departments of East Asian Studies and Theology and Religious Studies.

He was on the editorial board of the short-lived Medieval History Magazine (2003–2005), which was published in association with the Royal Armouries. He was a consultant for the PC game Shogun: Total War and also its sequel Total War: Shogun 2, both products of Creative Assembly, as well as historical advisor on the Hollywood film 47 Ronin starring Keanu Reeves. He also appeared as a subject matter expert for the Netflix documentary series Age of Samurai: Battle for Japan in 2021.

He is semi-retired, but still holds the post of Visiting Professor of Japanese Studies at Akita International University in Japan.

== Selected works ==
- 1979 – Samurai armies, 1550–1615. London: Osprey Publishing. ISBN 978-0-85045-302-7; OCLC 6489751
  - reprinted by Osprey, 2003: OCLC 225518299
- 1980 – The Mongols. Oxford: Osprey Publishing. ISBN 978-0-85045-372-0
- 1982 – The Book of the Samurai. Leicester, England: Magna Books. ISBN 978-0-948509-30-8; OCLC 15875673
- 1985 – The Book of the Medieval Knight. London: Arms and Armour Press. ISBN 978-0-85368-715-3; OCLC 12501653.
- 1987 – Samurai Warriors. Poole, Dorset: Blandford Press. ISBN 978-0-7137-1767-9; OCLC 17551861
- 1989 – Samurai Warlords: The Book of the Daimyō. London: Blandford. ISBN 978-0-7137-2003-7; OCLC 22628902
- 1991 – Ninja: The True Story of Japan's Secret Warrior Cult. Poole, Dorset: Firebird Books. ISBN 978-1-85314-109-6; OCLC 24701255
- 1996 – The Samurai: A Military History. London: Routledge. ISBN 978-1-873410-38-7
- 1997 – Samurai Warfare. London: Arms and Armour Press. ISBN 978-1-85409-432-2; OCLC 38030598
- 1998 – The Samurai Sourcebook. London: Arms & Armour Press. ISBN 978-1-85409-371-4; OCLC 60220867
  - reprinted by Cassell, London, 2000. ISBN 978-1-85409-523-7; OCLC 59400034
- 2000 – Nagashino 1575: Slaughter at the Barricades. Oxford: Osprey Publishing. ISBN 978-1-85532-619-4
- 2001 – Ashigaru 1467–1649: Weapons, Armour, Tactics. Oxford: Osprey Publishing. ISBN 978-1-84176-149-7
- 2001 – The Knight Triumphant: The High Middle Ages, 1314–1485. London: Cassell. ISBN 978-0-304-35971-4; OCLC 51108644
- 2002 – Samurai Heraldry. Oxford: Osprey Publishing. ISBN 978-1-84176-304-0
- 2002 – Samurai Invasion: Japan's Korean War, 1592–1598. London: Cassell. ISBN 978-0-304-35948-6
- 2002 – War in Japan: 1467–1615. Oxford: Osprey Publishing. ISBN 978-1-84176-480-1
- 2002 – Fighting Ships of the Far East (1): China and Southeast Asia, 202 BC-AD 1419. Oxford: Osprey Publishing. ISBN 978-1-84176-386-6
- 2003 – The Ottoman Empire 1326–1699 Bloomsbury USA. ISBN 978-1-84176-569-3
- 2003 – Genghis Khan & the Mongol Conquests 1190–1400. Oxford: Osprey Publishing. ISBN 978-1-84176-523-5
- 2003 – Fighting Ships of the Far East (2): Japan and Korea AD 612-1639. Oxford: Osprey Publishing. ISBN 978-1-84176-478-8
- 2003 – Japanese castles, 1540–1640. Oxford: Osprey Publishing. ISBN 978-1-84176-429-0
- 2003 – Japanese Warrior Monks AD 949–1603. Oxford: Osprey Publishing. ISBN 978-1-84176-573-0
- 2003 – Kawanakajima 1553–1564: Samurai Power Struggle. Oxford: Osprey Publishing. ISBN 978-1-84176-562-4
- 2003 – Ninja AD 1460–1650. Oxford: Osprey Publishing. ISBN 978-1-84176-525-9
- 2003 – Tannenberg 1410: Disaster for the Teutonic Knights. Oxford: Osprey Publishing. ISBN 978-1-84176-561-7; OCLC 51779463
- 2003 – Samurai: The World of the Warrior. Oxford: Osprey Publishing. ISBN 978-1-84176-740-6
- 2004 – The Walls of Constantinople: AD 324–1453. Oxford:Osprey Publishing. ISBN 978-1-84176-759-8
- 2004 – Samurai: The Story of Japan's Greatest Warriors. London: PRC Publishing Ltd. ISBN 978-1-85648-703-0
  - reprinted by Metro Books, 2013
- 2005 – Warriors of Medieval Japan. Oxford: Osprey Publishing. ISBN 978-1-84603-220-2
- 2005 – Samurai Commanders. Oxford: Osprey Publishing. ISBN 1-84176-743-3
- 2007 – The Great Wall of China 221 BC - AD 1644 Oxford: Osprey Publishing. ISBN 978-1-84603-004-8
- 2008 – The Samurai Swordsman: Master of War. London: Frontline Books. ISBN 978-1-84415-712-9; OCLC 181927617
- 2010 – Katana: The Samurai Sword. Oxford: Osprey Publishing ISBN 978-1-84908-151-1
- 2011 – The Revenge of the 47 Ronin. Oxford: Osprey Publishing. ISBN 978-1-84908-427-7
- 2016 – The Genpei War 1180-85: The Great Samurai Civil War. Oxford: Osprey Publishing. ISBN 978-1-47281-384-8
- 2017 – Ninja: Unmasking the Myth Casemate Publishers. ISBN 978-1-47385-042-2

=== Journal articles ===
- "Legacy of Centuries: The Walls of Constantinople", Medieval History Magazine (MHM), Issue 2, October 2003.
- "Mongol strategy and the Battle of Leignitz 1241", MHM, Issue 3, November 2003.
- "The Teutonic Knights' battle for Riga", MHM, Issue 6, February 2004.
- "The Passing of the Medieval Castle", MHM, Issue 9, May 2004.
- "St Catherine's Monastery: Sanctuary of Ages", MHM, Issue 11 July 2004.
- "Fighting Cardinals: Henry Beaufort & Guiliano Cesarini", MHM, Issue 13, September 2004.
- "A Tale of Two Cities: Siege success and failure at Constantinople and Belgrade", MHM, Issue 16, December 2004.
- "The Blunted Arrowhead: The defensive role of the great medieval fortresses of Albania", MHM, Issue 17, January 2005.
- "The Ninja: An Invented Tradition?", Journal of Global Initiatives: Policy, Pedagogy, Perspective, Vol. 9: No. 1, Article 3, 2014.
- "Biting the Bullet: A Reassessment of the Development, Use and Impact of Early Firearms in Japan", Vulcan, Vol.8: No.1, December 2020.

== Filmography ==
Year	Title	Role	Notes
2021	Age of Samurai: Battle for Japan	Self-Historian	TV documentary
2013	47 Ronin	Historical advisor	Film
2013	Samurai Headhunters	Self—Japanese historian	TV documentary
2012	Ninja Shadow Warriors	Self—Historian	TV documentary
2011	Total War: Shogun 2	Historical consultant	Video game
2008	Heroes and Villains (TV series)	Historical consultant	TV Documentary
2000	Shogun: Total War	Historical consultant	Video game
2004	Samurai: The Last Warrior	Historical consultant (as Dr. Stephen Turnbull)	TV documentary

== Honours ==
- British Association for Japanese Studies, Cannon Prize.
- Japan Festival Literary Award (1998).
