= Nape 'a Motana =

South African writer

Nape 'a Motana (born 1945) is a Pretoria-based South African writer, known for the novel Fanie Fourie's Lobola (University of KwaZulu-Natal Press, 2007), which was subsequently made into a film of the same name. His play, The Honeymoon is Over, won the New Voices Award in 1995. He authored Sepedi Proverbs, illustrated by Garth Erasmus and published in 2004, and the young adult novel Hamba Sugar Daddy (Jacana Media, 2016). His other novels are Son-in-law of the Boere (2010), Rabeka's Dream (2015) and Babatunde’s Heroic Journey (2018).

Motana studied creative writing at the University of Cape Town and the University of Pretoria, obtaining an MA and a PhD. He is married to Sibongile with whom he has two daughters, Mmasello and Thabang, and two sons, Ramaswaile and Bafana-Bafana. Motana has also worked as a copywriter, a social worker and a journalist.
