= Mpho Osei Tutu =

French-born South African actor

- Born: Mpho Osei Tutu; 31 December 1981 (age 44); Paris, France
- Education: Wits University
- Occupations: Actor, producer, director
- Years active: 2006–present
- Spouse: Tumi Morake (m. 2009)
- Website: www.mphooseitutu.com

Mpho Osei Tutu (born 31 December 1981), is a French-born South African actor and voice artist of Ghanaian-Mosotho descent. He is best known for his roles in the films and television serials: Seriously Single, Resident Evil and Outer Banks. Aside from acting, he is also a screenwriter, director and producer. Osei-Tutu also starred as the leading characters of the South African 2018 series called The Imposter, he played the roles of twins, Tebogo and Gary Mokoena.

== Personal life ==
He was born on 31 December 1981 in Paris, France to a Ghanaian father and Mosotho mother. Due to being of multinational origin, he has lived in several countries: Lesotho, France, England, Togo and Ghana. In 1992, his family settled in South Africa. He started drama at the age of eight. He later obtained a B.A. (Hons) degree in Dramatic Art from Wits University.

He is married to Tumi Morake, a fellow actress, comedian and writer. They married on 28 November 2009. The couple has three children.

== Career ==
He started acting in theater where he played several acting roles in the plays Zakes Mda's The Mother Of All Eating, Pieter-Dirk Uys' MacBeki, Paul Slabolepsky's For Your Ears Only, The Island. With the latter, he has toured the UK, the US and Greece. Then he made Getting it On which won Best Overall Short Cut Award at the Multi Choice VUKA! Awards in 2006. Then he played multiple characters in his self-penned Convincing Carlos in which he received an inaugural Standard Bank Ovation Award in 2010. For the role 'La Fleche' in Sylvaine Strike's play The Miser he won the Best Play at the 2013 Naledi Theatre Awards.

Meanwhile, he joined television, acting in several sitcoms Kota Life Crisis, High Rollers, Samsokolo; for which he was nominated for Best Actor in TV Comedy at the 2014 SAFTAs. Then he starred as 'Desmond' in the International Emmy Nominated serial Home Affairs. Then he featured with the role 'Bomba' in the internationally acclaimed feature film A Million Colors. He was also nominated for Best Supporting Actor in a Feature Film at the 2013 SAFTAs for this film. He is also a popular voice artist where he rendered his voice in several radio stations.

Apart from acting, he also worked as a screenwriter for the television series Ses Top La, Tempy Pushas, My Perfect Family where he nominated for Best Writing in a TV Comedy at 2014 SAFTAs, as well as Rhythm City which won the award for the Best Writing in a TV Soap at the SAFTAs in 2009., In 2010, he wrote Hopeville and nominated for an International Emmy Award in 2010. Meanwhile, he also excelled as a director with the films Zone 14, Ga Re Dumele 4 and Kota Life Crisis.

He later co-produced the short film Joburg which was officially selected for Sundance Film Festival in 2010. He founded the film production company, 'What Not Entertainment' and later produced 2 Seasons of the sitcom Kota Life Crisis for Mzansi Magic. From 2012 to 2014, he served on the board of The South African Guild of Actors (SAGA). In the meantime, he was the organizer of the Repertory Amateur Players Society (RAPS) One Act Plays Festival, which is regarded as the longest running and most prestigious high school's drama festival in South Africa.

In August 2020, he starred in the sex comedy film Seriously Single co-directed by Katleho Ramaphakela and Rethabile Ramaphakela. It was released on 31 July 2020, on Netflix.

== Partial filmography ==
Year	Film	Role	Genre	Ref.
2018	The imposter	Gary Mokoena or Tebogo	TV Series	
2020	Black Tax	Pastor Miles	TV series	
2020	Seriously Single	Hotel Receptionist	Film	
2022	Resident Evil	Yen	TV series	
