= Sandile Mahlangu =

South African actor

- Born: Sandile Vincent Mahlangu; 6 September 1993 (age 32); Middelburg, South Africa
- Other name: Vincent
- Education: Steelcrest High School
- Alma mater: Tshwane University of Technology
- Occupations: Actor, Model, Musical Artist
- Years active: 2016–present
- Known for: Scandal! Isithembiso; Single Guys
- Height: 177 cm (5 ft 10 in)
- Title: Mr
- Children: none
- Parents: Vikimpi Mahlangu (father); Lorraine Mahlangu (mother)
- Relatives: Thabang Molaba

Sandile Vincent Mahlangu (born 6 September 1993) is a South African actor and singer. He is best known for his roles in popular TV series namely Single Guys and Isithembiso and his popular film Shaft 6. In 2020 he joined the TV series Scandal as Simo Shabangu.

== Early life ==
He was born on 6 September 1993 in Middelburg, Mpumalanga, South Africa. He attended Steelcrest High School for education, having been selected to be an electrical apprentice at SAMANCOR Ferrochrome in Middelburg he was sent to do his on the job practicals in the North West, he then later graduated at Tshwane University of Technology (TUT) with a degree in Electrical engineering in 2017. In the same year, he moved to Johannesburg to pursue acting.

== Career ==
He also featured in the popular soap opera Rhythm City in July 2016, where he played the role 'Cash'. His role 'Cheezeboi' in the popular television series Isithembiso became highly popular among the public. Initially recurring, he was promoted to starring cast for Season 2 of the series.

He has featured in several commercials for KFC, Debonairs Pizza, Halls, Sunbet International, Cell C and Stimorol.

In 2017, he played the role of type-A med student 'Siya' in the television serial Single Guys in season two.

In 2018, he starred in the film Shaft 6 alongside Vuyo Dabula and Deon Lotz playing the role of 'Uuta Mazibuko'.

From 2020-2021, he played the role of 'Simo Shabangu' in e.tv television soap opera Scandal! and in the same year, he starred in the highly acclaimed Netflix original How to Ruin Christmas: The Wedding as ‘Sbu Twala’. He reprised his role for the second instalment, titled ‘The Funeral’.

== Filmography ==
Year	Film	Role	Genre	Channel
2016	Rhythm City	Cash	Soap Opera	e.tv
2017	Single Guys	Siya	TV Sitcom	SABC 1
2018 - 2020	Isithembiso	Cheezboi	Telenovela	Mzansi Magic
2020	Shaft 6	Uuta Mazibuko	Psychological Thriller	Film
2020	Scandal!	Simo Shabangu	Soap Opera	e.tv
2020	How to Ruin Christmas : The Wedding	Sbu Twala	Romantic Comedy	Netflix
2021	How to Ruin Christmas: The Funeral	Sbu Twala	Romantic Comedy	Netflix
2022	Durban Gen	Fikile “Ficks”	Medical Drama Telenovela	e.tv
2022	Jewel	Muzi	Thriller	Netflix
2022	Umbuso	Samora Nyandeni	TV series	Mzansi Magic
2022	Gereza	Mmini	Action	Amazon Prime Video
2022	The Queenstown Kings	Philip Dladla	Drama	Netflix
2022	Cogito Ergo Sum	Philip Radebe	Psychological Thriller	Film
2022	How to Ruin Christmas: The Baby Shower	Sbu Twala	Romantic Comedy	Netflix
2022	Grown Woman	Sakhile Hlatshwayo	Dramedy	Mzansi Magic
2024	Empini	Jabulani Ngubane	Drama	Showmax
2024	How to Ruin Love: The Proposal	Sbu Twala	Romantic Comedy	Netflix
2024	Lobola Man	Duke	Romantic Comedy	Netflix
2025	Inimba	Onga	Drama	Mzansi Magic
2025	How To Ruin Love:The Lobola	Sbu Twala	Romantic Comedy	Netflix
