= Christina Ochoa =

Spanish actress and science communicator (born 1985)

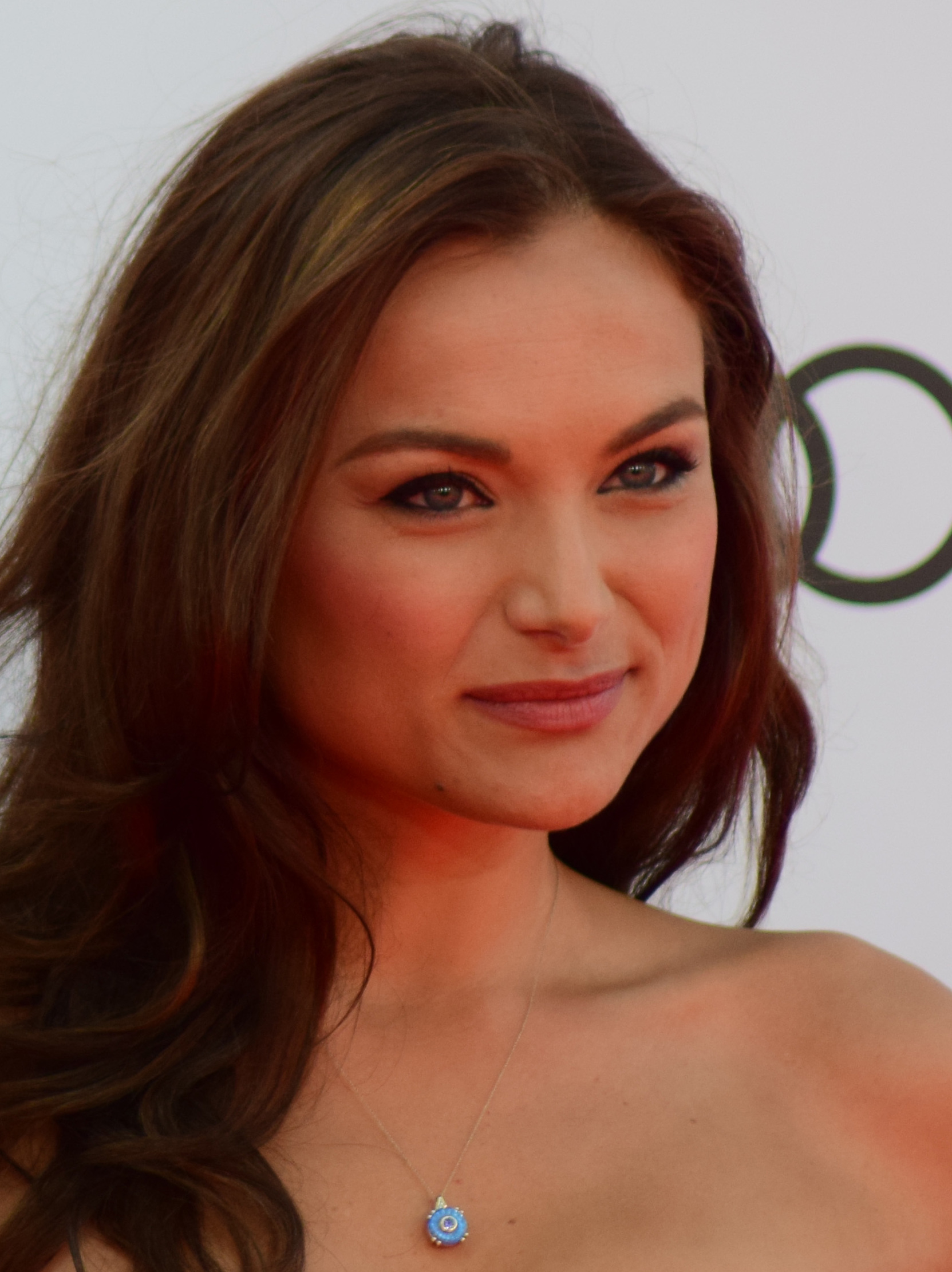
- Christina Ochoa in 2015
- Born: Cristina Ochoa Lopez; January 25, 1985 (age 41); Barcelona, Catalonia, Spain
- Occupations: Actress, science communicator
- Years active: 2007–present
- Parent: Víctor Ochoa

Cristina Ochoa Lopez (born 25 January 1985), known professionally as Christina Ochoa, is a Spanish actress and science communicator. She is the grand-niece of Nobel Prize winner Severo Ochoa and the daughter of sculptor Victor Ochoa.

== Early life ==
Ochoa is the grand-niece of 1959 Nobel Prize winner Severo Ochoa, and the daughter of acclaimed Spanish sculptor Victor Ochoa. She has spent her life surrounded by members of both the scientific and artistic worlds.

== Theatre and film ==
From there, Ochoa moved on to work in theatre and TV, including on I Hate My Teenage Daughter, Modern Family and Spain's La que se avecina, as well as in films, including Cats Dancing on Jupiter.

She is the founder and owner of QE (Quantum Entanglement) Productions, responsible for the 2011 short film Stay with Me, which won awards at film festivals both internationally and in the United States.

In 2014, Ochoa played Karen Morales on the Robert Rodríguez show Matador.

She has portrayed Renn on the TNT drama Animal Kingdom since 2016.

In 2017 she became the female lead of NBC Universal and Syfy series Blood Drive.

On 20 February 2018, Ochoa played Ashley Morales in the ABC drama series A Million Little Things before the series ordered in May 2018. Ochoa exited the series after one season and 13 episodes in first-season episode, "Twelve Seconds" on 31 January 2019.

== Writing ==
Ochoa has written articles for several publications. Her first published work was featured in Vogue Spain. She has regular spreads featured in H, in which she focuses on profile pieces and book reviews. She also has a monthly film column in the Spanish digital newspaper El Imparcial.

== Science communication and academia ==
Ochoa is on the advisory board for OCEANA and Earths Oceans. She is the host of the Know Brainer podcast, and has been the host and keynote of several scientific conferences and shows including the college prep program MESA, Bitesize TV's Chaotic Awesome, and NERD ALERT on The Young Turks network.

She is part of the Los Angeles Committee for Science for Society, which promotes science in society and scientific literacy, and which is the sponsor of the Intel Science and Engineering Fair (ISEF). She served as commentator for ISEF 2017.

After graduating from Santa Isabel La Asunción (high school) in Madrid, she began an undergraduate degree in oceanographic engineering at Universidad de las Palmas de Gran Canaria, off the coast of Africa in the Canary Islands, ranked 1251+ in Engineering, according to Times Higher Education in that subject.

She continued with marine biology studies at James Cook University in Australia, where she focused on Elasmobranchii, subclass which includes sharks and rays.

She also enrolled in additional subjects in particle physics at the Universidad Nacional de Educacion a Distancia (UNED) but merged into full-time acting before she could complete her master's degree.

She has also participated as an expert guest on the scientific comedy podcast Professor Blastoff, part of the Earwolf network; Cara Santa Maria's Talk Nerdy; and several online STEM education platforms.

== Selected filmography ==
=== Film ===
Year	Title	Role	Notes
2011	Cats Dancing on Jupiter	Jennifer	
2011	Stay with Me	Andrea	Short film
2022	Boon	Emilia	
2022	MVP	Tracy Phillips	
2024	Fight Another Day	Isabelle	
2026	Above & Below	TBA	Post-production

=== Television ===
Year	Title	Role	Notes
2009	Contáct@me	Gabriela	
2011	I Hate My Teenage Daughter	Dominique	Episode: "Teenage Family Night"
2012	Modern Family	Nurse	Episode: "Baby on Board"
2013	The Neighbors	Princess Leia	Episode: "A Christmas Story"
2014	Matador	Karen Morales	
2014	Chaotic Awesome	Herself	Web series; co-writer and correspondent
2016–2022	Animal Kingdom	Renn Randall	Recurring role, 35 episodes
2017	Blood Drive	Grace D'Argento	Main role, 13 episodes
2017–2018	Valor	CW3 Nora Madani	Main role, 13 episodes
2018–2019	A Million Little Things	Ashley Morales	Main role (Season 1), 13 episodes
2022	Promised Land	Veronica Sandoval	Main role
