= How to Ruin Christmas =

South African comedy drama television series

- Genre: Comedy drama
- Starring: Busi Lurayi; Thando Thabethe; Yonda Thomas
- Country of origin: South Africa
- Original languages: Zulu; English; Southern Sotho; Tswana; IsiXhosa
- No. of seasons: 3
- No. of episodes: 10

Production
- Running time: 42–53 minutes
- Production company: Burnt Onion Productions

Original release
- Network: Netflix
- Release: 16 December 2020 – 9 December 2022

How to Ruin Christmas is a South African comedy drama television series produced by Burnt Onion Productions for Netflix. Comprising an ensemble cast led by Busi Lurayi, each season centres around the Christmas gatherings of a newly-wedded couple and their respective families, as they navigate their own inner turmoils in the midst of the pending event.

Since its premiere, the series has garnered critical acclaim and has received numerous accolades.

== Cast ==
- Busi Lurayi as Tumi Sello
- Thando Thabethe as Beauty Sello
- Yonda Thomas as Khaya Manqele
- Nambitha Ben-Mazwi as Refiloe
- Clementine Mosimane as Dineo Sello
- Sandile Mahlangu as Sbu Twala
- Motlatsi Mafatshe as Themba Twala
- Kagiso Rathebe as Terrence
- Lehlohonolo Saint Seseli as Vusi Twala
- Charmaine Mtinta as Valencia Twala
- Swankie Mafoko as Lydia Twala
- Lethabo Bereng as Cousin Bokang
- Desmond Dube as Uncle Shadrack
- Rami Chuene as Aunt Grace
- Keketso Semoko as Aunt Moipone
- Nandi Nyembe as Gogo Twala
- Dippy Padi as Thando
- Trevor Gumbi as Siya Twala
- T sumo Nkosi as Lulu
- Lindokuhle Modi as Nimrod

== Episodes ==
Season	Title	Episodes	Originally released
1	The Wedding	3	December 16, 2020
2	The Funeral	4	December 10, 2021
3	The Baby Shower	3	December 9, 2022

=== Season 1: The Wedding (2020) ===
No. overall	No. in season	Title	Directed by	Written by	Original release date
1	1	"It's Not What It Looks Like"	Johnny Barbuzano	Lwazi Mvusi	December 16, 2020
A reluctant bridesmaid to the core, Tumi arrives the day before her sister's traditional wedding day and manages to upset almost everyone.
2	2	"I'll Handle This"	Johnny Barbuzano	Sunni Faba	December 16, 2020
To get back in her family's good graces, Tumi looks for the missing best man. Against their better judgement, Tumi and Beauty seek out a family member.
3	3	"Can't a Girl Catch a Break"	Johnny Barbuzano	Salah Sabiti	December 16, 2020
Tumi shocks both families and devastates Beauty by letting slip a secret. But this time, after some soul searching, she decides to face the music.

=== Season 2: The Funeral (2021) ===
No. overall	No. in season	Title	Directed by	Written by	Original release date
4	1	"Here We Go Again"	Johnny Barbuzano	Lwazi Mvusi	December 10, 2021
Tumi returns home for another Christmas family holiday and, against her better judgment, agrees to take Gogo Twala out for some fun.
5	2	"Sorry for Your Loss"	Johnny Barbuzano	Sunni Faba	December 10, 2021
Once again, Tumi seems to have ruined the holiday. Later, she learns some very surprising things about Gogo Twala. Vusi deals with money issues.
6	3	"Where's Tumi?"	Johnny Barbuzano	Lwazi Mvusi	December 10, 2021
Back at the Lekhekhe Club, Tumi tries to drink her worries away. Siya wants a lavish funeral, but Vusi is determined to keep costs down.
7	4	"Happily Ever After"	Johnny Barbuzano	Salah Sabiti	December 10, 2021
Secrets are revealed when things finally come to a head with Bab'Mkhize and the rest of the family. Khaya makes his move.

=== Season 3: The Baby Shower (2022) ===
No. overall	No. in season	Title	Directed by	Written by	Original release date
8	1	"Where there's Smoke"	Johnny Barbuzano	Lwazi Mvusi	December 9, 2022
With Beauty and Sbu expecting their first child, tensions run high as the Sello and Twala families are forced to reunite for the shower.
9	2	"A Moth to the Flame"	Johnny Barbuzano	Salah Sabiti	December 9, 2022
After the baby shower ends in flames, the Sellos wind up at the Twala lodge for Christmas. Secrets swirl as everyone tries to hide their wrongdoings.
10	3	"Like House the Fire"	Johnny Barbuzano	Lwazi Mvusi	December 9, 2022
As various truths finally come to light, the Sellos and Twalas must put the past behind them and come together to help Beauty in her time of need.

== See also ==
- List of Christmas films
