= Kwenzo Ngcobo =

South African actor (born 1992)

Kwenzokuhle "Kwenzo" Ngcobo (born 15 February 1992) is a South African actor. He is best known for portraying Qhawe Zulu in the third season of the Showmax series The Wife and as Alex Shabane in the Netflix thriller Soon Comes the Night.

== Life and career ==
Ngcobo was born in Izingolweni, near Port Shepstone, KwaZulu-Natal, South Africa. He has a twin brother. He graduated with a Bachelor of Arts in Drama from the Durban University of Technology (DUT) in 2013.

Ngcobo made his television debut in the e.tv soap opera Imbewu, playing Themba. He later starred as Qhawe Zulu in the third season of the Showmax series The Wife, alongside Gaisang Noge. In 2024, he appeared in the Netflix thriller series Soon Comes Night as Alex Shabane. He also had a role in Uzalo (2021).

== Filmography ==
Year	Title	Role	Notes
2018	Freedom Street	John	TV Series
2018	Room 33	Student 3	Film
2019	uMalusi	Bab'Bhengu	Film
2019	Saloon	Nkanyamba	Film
2020	Catch-Up	Sandile	Film
2021 - 2023	The Wife	Qhawe Zulu	TV Series
2024	Soon Comes Night	Alex Shabane	TV Series
2024	Red Ink	Kagiso	TV Series
2024	Ekhaya Backpackers	Jabu	TV Series
2025	Scandal!	Nhloso Gasa	Soap Opera

== Awards and nominations ==
Year	Award	Category	Work	Result	Ref
2022	Dstv Mzansi Viewers' Choice Awards	Favourite Rising Star	Won	Himself	
2022	GQ Men of the Year Awards	People's Choice Award	Won	Himself	
2025	Simon Mabhunu Sabela KZN Film and Television Awards	Best Actor	Won	As Nhloso Gasa on Scandal!	
