= Scandal! =

South African soap opera

- Genre: Drama; Soap opera
- Created by: Mbuso Thabethe
- Directed by: Ian Nkulu
- Starring: Mapaseka Koetle; Mamarumo Marokane; Makoma Mohale; Kgaugelo James Sithole; Boikarabelo M.Mabuza; Bongile Mantsai; Owen Sejake; Bongani Gumede; Keitumetse Kasonkola; Natasha Sutherland; Jerry Mofokeng; Thapelo Aphiri; Lithlohonolo Lithlakanyane; Daniel Janks; Seputla Sebogodi; Kamogelo Maree; Lebogang Msiza; Nombulelo Mhlongo; Wright Ngubeni; Bothlale Nia Brown; Danny De Bruyne; Edward Nkhumishe; Khutjo Green; Ruth Tladi; Wonder Ndlovu; Thandolwethu Ngidi; Omhle Tshabalala; Zekhethelo Zondi
- Opening theme: Scandal!
- Ending theme: Scandal!
- Country of origin: South Africa
- Original language: English
- No. of episodes: 5174

Production
- Production locations: Johannesburg; Soweto
- Running time: 30 minutes (incl. commercials)
- Production company: Ochre Media (a wholly owned subsidiary of Arena Holdings)

Original release
- Network: e.tv
- Release: 10 January 2005 – 26 June 2026

Related
- Rhythm City

Scandal! Is a South African soap opera produced by Ochre Media (also known as Ochre Moving Pictures) that ran on e.tv from 2005 to 2026. It is the most watched soap opera in South Africa, contending with SABC 1's longest-running soapie Generations: The Legacy. It is also broadcast across Africa on the eAfrica, e.tv Botswana and e.tv Ghana feeds.

On 10 July 2024, e.tv announced that Scandal! will start airing daily, occupying the 19:30 spot dubbed as the "Winter binge". The program reverted to its standard time slot on 7 September 2024.

On 26 September 2025, e.tv announced that Scandal! will air its final episode on 26 June 2026.

== Plot ==
Scandal! is set at the fictional media company Nyathi Family Holdings (NFH) based in Newtown, Johannesburg, which produces the newspaper The Voice and the gossip magazine, Scandal. It follows the lives of the people and families working at NFH magazine as well as other characters in the show. It also tells the story of socioeconomic divides set in a local township of Soweto and the Johannesburg suburb Newtown, where NFH is based, while looking at the private desires of the high-classes and making ends meet of the lower-class.

== Cast as per Opening Sequence ==
As shown on opening scene

- Mapaseka Koetle
- Mamarumo Marokane
- Makoma Mohale
- Kgaugelo James Sithole
- Boikarabelo M. Mabuza
- Kwenzo Ngcobo
- Bongile Mantsai
- Owen Sejake
- Bongani Gumede

== Main cast ==
Actor	Role	Status
Mapaseka Koetle	Dintle Gasa	Main
Mamarumo Marokane	Bridget Maseko	Main
Makoma Mohale	Thlogi Sindane	Main
James Kgaugelo Sithole	Tokollo Sindane	Main
Boikarabelo M.Mabuza	Thapelo More	Main
Bongile Mantsai	Mthunzi Mayiza	Main
Bongani Gumede	Ephraim Gasa	Main
Owen Sejake	Sammyday More	Main
Jo-Anne Reyneke	Buyi Mlotshwa	Supporting Role
Jerry Mofokeng	Neo Mokhethi	Supporting Role
Seputla Sebogodi	Kgopolo More	Supporting Role
Keitumetse Kasonkola	Talitha More	Supporting Role
Kamogelo Maree	Thoriso More	Supporting Role
Nombulelo Mhlongo	Philisiwe Gasa	Supporting Role
Wright Ngubeni	Botsotso	Supporting Role
Nia Brown	Tshidi	Supporting Role
Danny De Bruyne	De Wet	Supporting Role

== Former cast ==
Actor	Role	Status
Sandy Mokwena	Eddie Khumalo	Starring role
Mapaseka Koetle	Dintle Nyathi/Gasa	Starring Role
Joyce Skefu	Maletsatsi Khumalo	Starring role
Tumisho Masha	Hector Thebe	Starring role
Kgomotso Christopher	Yvonne Thebe	Starring role
Nomvelo Makhanya	Lindiwe Ngema-Maseko	Starring role
Botlhale Boikanyo	Omphile Ngema	Starring role
Melusi Mbele	Joseph JoJo Kubeka	Starring role
Clint Brink	Valentino Martins	Starring role
Lusanda Mbane	Boniswa Langa-Mamba	Starring role
Lorcia Cooper	Erin Martins	Starring role
Hlomla Dandala	Siseko Langa	Starring role
Luthuli Dlamini	Stan Nyathi	Starring role
Hungani Ndlovu	Romeo Medupe	Starring role
Sello Maake Ka-Ncube	Lucas Daniel Nyathi	Starring role
Masasa Mbangeni	Thembeka Shezi-Nyathi	Starring role
Kagiso Modupe	Mango Nyathi	Starring role
Nolwazi Ngubeni	Mbali Kubheka	Starring role
Ayanda Daweti	Chumani Langa-Xaba	Starring role
Mthunzi Ntoyi	Sijo	Supporting role
Sma Mathibeli	Nomcebo	Supporting role
Lerato Nxumalo	Phakamile Mdletshe	Starring role
Given Stuurman	Kgosi Lekgae	Supporting role
Kagiso Medupe	Mangi Nyathi	Starring role
Dineo Langa	Naledi Thebe	Supporting role
Brighton Ngoma	Quinton Nyathi	Starring role
Thuso Mbedu	Kitso Medupe	Supporting role
Bathabile Mashigo	Grace Medupe-Shabangu	Starring role
Candice Derman	Samantha	Supporting role
Avile Batwini	Eric Stein	Supporting role
Nthati Moshesh	Morongwa Molefe	Starring role
Masechaba MoShoe-Shoe	Mmadika Molefe	Starring role
Fulu Mughovhani	Anzani Chabedi	Starring role
Patrick Mofokeng	Mlungisi Ngema	Starring role
Fana Mokoena	Vukile Kubheka	Starring role
Slindile Nodangala	Nomvula Kubheka	Starring role
Sihle Ndaba	Duduzile Kubheka	Starring role
Getmore Sithole	Cain Gumede	Supporting role
Patronella Tshuma	Ruby	Supporting role
Khulu Skhenjana	Gorbachev	Starring role
Sandile Mahlangu	Simo Shabangu	Starring role
Cindy Mahlangu	Violetta Mamba	Starring role
Dawn Matthews	Shakira Nyathi	Starring role
Fundiswa Ngcobo	Winnie Hlatshwayo	Supporting role
Sivenathi Mabuya-Bukani	Xolile Medupe	Starring role
Joe Kazadi	Mukuna	Supporting role
Gcina Nkosi	Zinzile Ngema	Starring role
Tshepo Mosese	Lerumo Chabedi	Starring role
Nolo Seabi	Seipati	Starring role
Busisiwe Lurayi	Me'Shell	Supporting role
Thuli Thabethe	Me'Shell	Supporting role
Mothusi Magano	Phehello Mokhethi	Starring role
Kagiso Rathebe	Amo	Supporting role
Siyabonga Shibe	Kila Ngcobo	Starring role
Simo Magwaza	Mamba	Starring role
Bohang Moeko	Tshepo Tladi	Supporting role
Siyabonga Gcwensa	Mbuso Mdletshe	Supporting role
Matthews Rantsoma	Nhlamulo Maseko	Starring role
Kwenzo Ngcobo	Nhloso Gasa	Starring role
Danica De La Rey Jones	Simone Smith	Supporting role
Kim Cloete	Kimberley Smith	Supporting role

== Achievements ==
=== South Africa Film and Television Awards ===
Year	Nominee / work	Award	Result	Ref.
2023	Scandal!	Best TV Soap	Won	
2024	Scandal!	Most Popular TV Soap/Telenovela	Won	
2024	Scandal!	Best TV Soap	Nominated	
