= Fanie Fourie's Lobola =

- Directed by: Henk Pretorius
- Screenplay by: Henk Pretorius, Janine Eser
- Story by: Romantic comedy
- Based on: Fanie Fourie's Lobola by Nape à Motana
- Produced by: Out of Africa Entertainment
- Cinematography: Trevor Calverley
- Edited by: Avril Beukes
- Music by: Adam Schiff
- Distributed by: Indigenous Film Distribution
- Release date: 1 March 2013 (South Africa)
- Running time: 97 minutes
- Country: South Africa
- Languages: English, Zulu, Afrikaans (English subtitles provided)
- Budget: $1 million
- Box office: $3.6 million

Fanie Fourie's Lobola is a 2013 South African romantic comedy based on the novel (of the same name) by Nape 'a Motana. The film features a culturally diverse cast of actors as well as a production team. The main focus of the film is cross-cultural relationships and the challenges associated with such relationships.

The film was shot in Aberdeen and Australia, both in Gauteng, South Africa. It was a commercial success, grossing more than $3.6 million against the production budget of $1 million.

== Plot summary ==
Fanie and Sarel are young Afrikaners; Fanie a custom car designer, Sarel a successful pop star. On a dare, Fanie invites a beautiful Zulu woman, Dinky Magubane, to come as his date to Sarel's wedding. Dinky agrees, provided Fanie pretend to be her boyfriend so she can evade her family's pressure towards marriage. Despite the deceitful intent, the two begin to genuinely fall in love.

== Cast ==
- Eduan van Jaarsveldt as Fanie Fourie
- Zethu Dlomo as Dinky Magubane
- Jerry Mofokeng as Dumisane Magubane
- Marga van Rooy as Louise Fourie
- Motlatsi Mafatshe as Mandla
- Chris Chameleon as Sarel Fourie
- Yule Masiteng as Petrus Mabuza
- Richard van der Westhuizen as Oom Kobus
- Connie Chiume as Zinzi
- Lillian Dube as Auntie Nomagugu
- Cherie van der Merwe as Mariaan Prinsloo
- Angelique Pretorius as Santjie
- Nina Marais as Tanya
- Khumbuzile Maphumulo as Patricia Mabuza (as Khumbuzile Kgomotso)
- Leon van Nierop as Presenter
- Morne du Toit as Raucous friend

== Critical reception ==
- Daniel Dercksen from The Writing Studio awarded Fanie Fourie's Lobola a rating of 5/5 in his review. Daniel sums the film up in the following brief conclusion [taken directly from his review written on the web]: "It is one of this films you can share with others who might not see the world you do, and at the end of the screening it is guaranteed that you will have made new friends. Fanie Fourie's Lobola is a film that everyone can enjoy with its English subtitles and message that transcends our borders."
- Nontsikelelo Mpulo from The Drum had the following brief conclusion in her review: "The film does not shy away from dealing with the racial prejudices that still thrive in South African society. Fanie is a stereotypical boere seun who knows very little about Zulu culture and so he blunders into situations that have the potential to create serious offence but the script is so well written that you’ll find yourself laughing out loud at some of his ludicrous antics."
- The website SPLING awarded the film a 7/10 in their review that came to the conclusion: "Fanie Fourie's Lobola is a crowd-pleaser - a romantic comedy that's fresh, entertaining, heartwarming, street smart and sweet. It's bold to tackle an interracial romance, it's bolder to turn it into a comedy. Henk Pretorius and his team have really turned Nape 'A Motana's story into a fun-loving and well-balanced feature film that proudly showcases our music, our diversity and our people. The bottom line: Charming"
- Reney Warrington from Litnet came to the following conclusion in her review: "FFL pokes fun at our cultural differences, and at how little we know about the different cultures in our country, but it does so with respect, without an accusatory tone. 10 out of 10 just for that! It goes beyond poking fun. It asks questions around racism, patriarchy and sexism and even goes so far as to suggest we should give the younger generation some room to start their own traditions."

== Awards ==
- 2013 Golden Space Needle Audience Award, Best Film, Seattle International Film Festival.
- Audience Choice Award at the second annual Jozi Film Festival.

== See also ==
- Klein Karoo, Regardt van den Bergh
- List of South African films
