= Masayoshi Haneda =

Japanese actor (born 1976)

- 羽田昌義
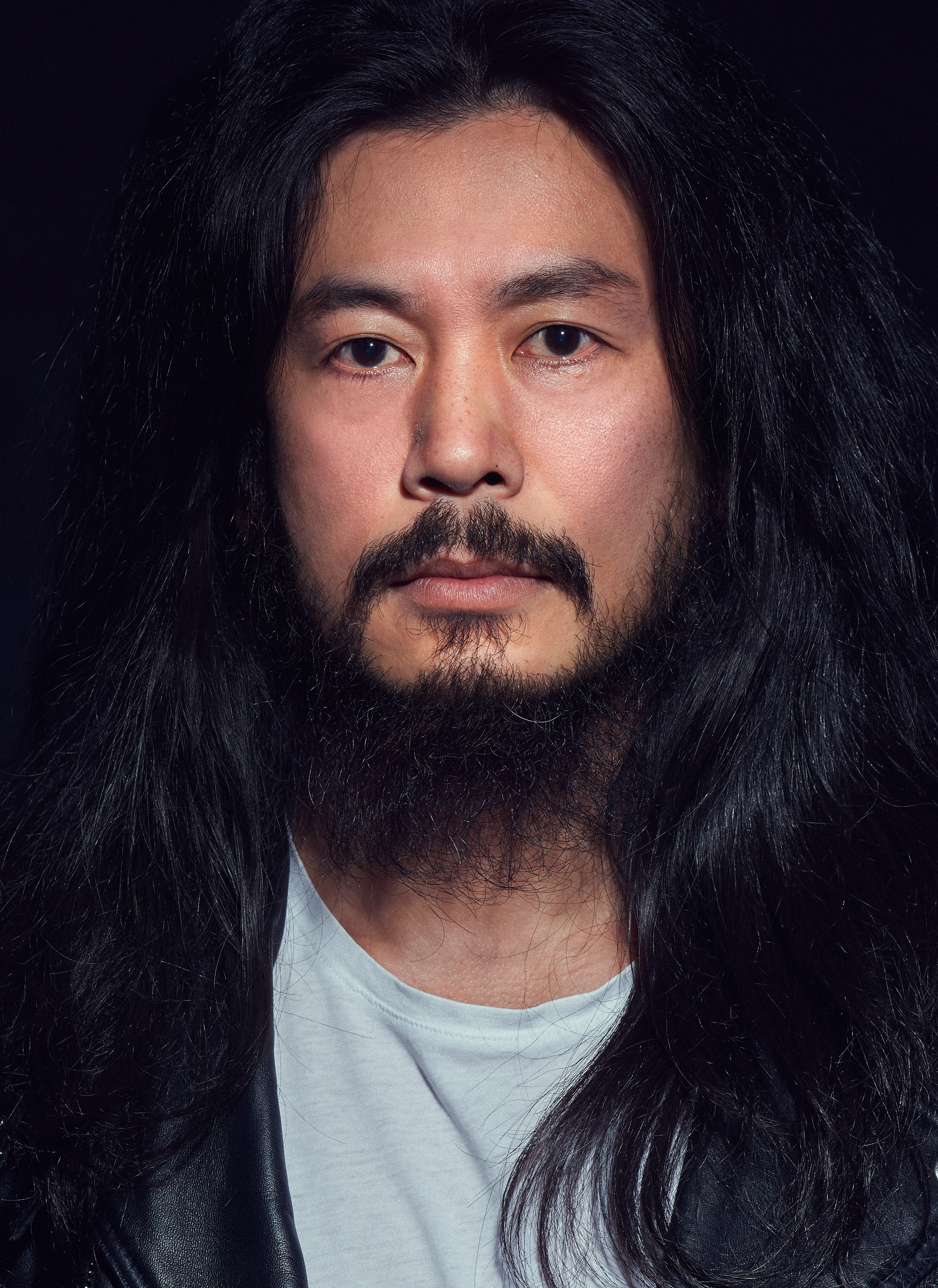
- Haneda in 2016
- Born: November 13, 1976 (age 49); Chiyoda, Tokyo, Japan
- Other name: Masayoshi Hanada
- Occupation: Actor
- Years active: 2003–present
- Spouse: Hitomi Furuya (m. 2008; div. 2011)

Masayoshi Haneda (羽田昌義, Haneda Masayoshi; born November 13, 1976) is a Japanese film and stage actor. He is best known for the role as Tanaka in the Westworld series.

== Career ==
At an early age, Haneda decided to pursue an acting career. From 1999 to 2000, under Yoko Narahashi, he attended the United Performers' Studio (UPS Academy) in Tokyo, where he took part on theatre in stage plays. After graduation he passionately continued his studies with workshops conducted by teachers of the Actors Studio, New York. In 2003, he was a stunt performer on the 2003 film The Last Samurai.

Haneda has appeared in films such as When the Last Sword Is Drawn (2003), Oh! My Zombie Mermaid (2004), Marebito (2004), Godzilla: Final Wars (2004), and Memories of Matsuko (2006). His international debut started in July 2006, with the joint French–German–Indian independent film Valley of Flowers. In 2008, Haneda appeared in a role in the American–Japanese film The Ramen Girl. In 2012, Haneda had a supporting role as a driver to Matthew Fox's character and interpreter in Emperor. This was followed by a role playing a samurai in 47 Ronin in 2013. In 2014, he was a soldier in Edge of Tomorrow.

== Personal life ==
Haneda met singer-songwriter Hitomi Furuya during a play in 2007. They were married on July 11, 2008. The couple have one child, a daughter, born on December 23, 2008. On December 6, 2011, it was reported that Haneda and Furuya had filed for divorce after it was revealed that they had been living separately for over six months by then.

== Filmography ==
=== Film ===
Year	Title	Role	Notes
2003	When the Last Sword Is Drawn		
2004	Oh! My Zombie Mermaid		
2004	Marebito		
2004	Godzilla: Final Wars		Uncredited role
2006	Memories of Matsuko		
2006	Valley of Flowers		
2008	The Ramen Girl	Yuki	Credited as Masayoshi Hanada
2011	Deadball		
2012	Emperor	Takahashi	
2013	47 Ronin	Yasuno	
2014	Edge of Tomorrow	Takeda	
2020	Minamata	Enforcer	
2024	Canary Black	Kenji Nakajima	

=== Television ===
Year	Title	Role	Notes
2014	Gunshi Kanbei	Hōjō Ujinao	Taiga drama
2018	Westworld	Tanaka	2 episodes
2021	Age of Samurai: Battle for Japan	Oda Nobunaga	3 episodes
2022	Tokyo Vice	Yoshihiro Kume	Supporting
2026	The Gentlemen (2024 TV series)	Takashi	Guest Role

=== Theatre ===
Year	Title	Director	Notes
2007	Waiting for the Sun	Yoko Narahashi	
2008	Balm in Gilead	Robert Allan Ackerman	
2008	Dream of Passion	Yoko Narahashi	
