= Mthunzi Ntoyi =

South African actor (born 1986)

- Born: Mthunzi Ntoyi; 3 March 1986 (age 40); Gauteng, South Africa
- Education: AFDA, The School for the Creative Economy
- Occupations: Actor, TV host, stand-up comedian, musician
- Years active: 2012–present

Mthunzi Ntoyi (born 3 March 1986) is a South African actor. He is best known for the roles in the films and television serials: Thula's Vine, Intersexions and Taryn & Sharon. Apart from acting, he is also a stand-up comedian and musician.

== Personal life ==
He was born on 3 March 1986 in South Africa.

== Career ==
Before entering drama, he studied and trained at AFDA, The School for the Creative Economy (AFDA).

He is also appeared in several minor and supportive roles in the television serials such as: Khululeka, Montana, Intersexions, Stash, Single Galz, Sokhulu & Partners, The Wild, Scandal!, Home Affairs and The Lab. In 2014, he played the role of 'Zola Yili' in the SABC1 drama series Montana. Then he was selected for the role 'Waka' in the Mzansi Magic soapie Zabalaza. The role became very popular as he then recurred for three seasons. In 2014, he was nominated for the Golden Horn Award for Best Actor in a TV Drama for his role in Montana.

In 2016, he began co-hosting the daytime comedic adventure game show for children titled Disney Cookabout. The show is considered as the first collaboration between The Walt Disney Company Africa and SABC. The show aired for a long-form series in South Africa. In the series, he played the role 'Sous Chef Mthunzi' along with Chef Kirsten played by Kirsten Mohamed where they demonstrate to a dynamic group of 'cooktestants' how to create simple and appetizing meals. In 2017 he performed as 'Zuko', in the SABC1 sitcom Thuli noThulani. In 2018, he was nominated for the Golden Horn Award for Best TV Presenter for his role Disney Cookabout.

In addition to television, he appeared in some international as well as local films particularly in cameo appearances: Mr. Bones 2: Back from the Past, Skyfall and The Bang Bang Club. In August 2020, he starred in the comedy film Seriously Single co-directed by Katleho Ramaphakela and Rethabile Ramaphakela. It was released on 31 July 2020, on Netflix.

== Television serials ==
- Disney Cookabout as Sous Chef Mthunzi
- Home Affairs as Guy Student 1
- Intersexions as Ntando
- Lockdown as Njabulo
- Montana as Zola Yili
- Scandal! as Sijo
- Single Galz as Finite
- Sober Companion as Comedian
- Stash as Sox
- Stokvel as Bongani
- Taryn & Sharon as Charles
- The Wild as Papi
- Thula's Vine as Sizwe
- Thuli noThulani as Zuko
- Zabalaza as Waka
