= Blood Drive (TV series) =

2017 American television series

- Also known as: Midnight Grindhouse Presents Blood Drive
- Genre: Action; Post-apocalyptic; Science fiction
- Created by: James Roland
- Starring: Alan Ritchson; Christina Ochoa; Thomas Dominique; Marama Corlett; Colin Cunningham
- Composer: Michael Gatt
- Country of origin: United States
- Original language: English
- No. of seasons: 1
- No. of episodes: 13

Production
- Executive producers: John Hlavin; David Straiton
- Producers: Fredrik Malmberg; Mark Wheeler
- Production location: Cape Town, South Africa
- Cinematography: Yaron Levy
- Editor: Kristina Hamilton-Grobler
- Camera setup: Single-camera
- Running time: 43 minutes
- Production companies: Strong & Dobbs Productions; Universal Cable Productions

Original release
- Network: Syfy
- Release: June 14 – September 6, 2017

Blood Drive is an American science fiction action television series that aired on Syfy from June 14 to September 6, 2017. On the same day that the finale aired, series creator James Roland announced that Syfy had decided to cancel the series after one season.

== Plot ==
Blood Drive is set in the dystopian "distant future" of alternate 1999, after the "Great Fracking Quakes" have literally split the United States apart, with a giant ravine called "the Scar" being formed roughly along the route of the Mississippi River. A megacorporation, Heart Enterprises, exploits strange discoveries from the bottom of the Scar to become ubiquitous across American politics, society, and the economy. Meanwhile, as a result of environmental decline, water has become scarce and gasoline prohibitively expensive.

The series features Los Angeles Police Department officer Arthur Bailey (Alan Ritchson), a.k.a. "Barbie", who is forced to partner up with Grace D'Argento (Christina Ochoa), a dangerous femme fatale who has an agenda of her own, as they take part in a death race in which the cars run on human blood – the titular Blood Drive, whose master of ceremonies, Julian Slink (Colin Cunningham), is secretly a Heart employee. As they make their way through the Blood Drive, Arthur and Grace realize that Heart has been involved in their own pasts as well.

== Cast ==
=== Main ===
- Alan Ritchson as Arthur Bailey
- Christina Ochoa as Grace D'Argento
- Thomas Dominique as Christopher Carpenter
- Marama Corlett as Aki
- Colin Cunningham as Julian Slink

=== Recurring ===
- Andrew Hall as the Gentleman
- Darren Kent as the Scholar
- Sean Cameron Michael as Old Man Heart
- Carel Nel as Rasher
- Aidan Whytock as Garrett Kemble
- Brandon Auret as Rib Bone
- Craig Jackson as Cliff
- Jenny Stead as Domi
- Alex McGregor as Karma

== Episodes ==
No.	Title	Directed by	Written by	Original release date	US viewers (millions)
1	"The F...ing Cop"	David Straiton	James Roland	June 14, 2017	0.834
A cop is forced to partner with a homicidal bombshell in a bloodthirsty road race across America.
2	"Welcome to Pixie Swallow"	David Straiton	Marc Halsey	June 21, 2017	0.627
Grace and Arthur battle to stay off the menu at the first pit stop, Pixie Swallow Motel & Diner.
3	"Steel City Nightfall"	James Roday	James Roland	June 28, 2017	0.444
Arthur and Grace race through a mysterious city only to fall prey to its nocturnal inhabitants.
4	"In the Crimson Halls of Kane Hill"	James Roday	Nina Fiore & John Herrera	July 5, 2017	0.490
Arthur and Grace take a dangerous detour to a mental asylum to search for Grace's missing sister.
5	"The F...ing Dead"	Roel Reiné	Harrison Weinfeld & Daniel Zucker	July 12, 2017	0.454
Arthur and Grace must find a cure to a deadly sex plague that is unleashed on the Mayhem Party.
6	"Booby Traps"	Roel Reiné	Ben Wolf	July 19, 2017	0.436
Amazons ambush Arthur and Grace in the Savage Lands, but they hold a clue about Karma's location.
7	"The Gentleman's Agreement"	Lin Oeding	James Roland	July 26, 2017	0.380
Slink unleashes a demon from the belly of Heart Enterprises to exact his revenge and take control.
8	"A Fistful of Blood"	Lin Oeding	James Roland & John Hlavin	August 2, 2017	0.498
Arthur helps a wasteland sheriff free his town, but the line between good and evil is not easily drawn.
9	"The Chopsocky Special"	Meera Menon	Nina Fiore & John Herrera	August 9, 2017	0.334
Grace tests her kung fu against a mystic restaurateur; a dying Arthur embarks on a vision quest.
10	"Scar Tissue"	Meera Menon	Alex Ebel	August 16, 2017	0.343
A wounded Arthur stumbles into Cronenburgh, a wasteland oasis that may be too good to be true.
11	"Rise of the Primo"	Gregg Simon	Ben Wolf	August 23, 2017	0.377
Arthur resists bloodlust; Grace confronts a shocking revelation in a deadly battle-dome fight.
12	"Faces of Blood Drive"	David Straiton	Harrison Weinfeld & Daniel Zucker	August 30, 2017	0.364
Slink throws the ultimate mayhem party; Grace and a mysterious newcomer fight for Arthur's soul.
13	"Finish Line"	David Straiton	James Roland	September 6, 2017	0.364
Arthur, Grace and Slink attack Heart Enterprises, but their deepest fears await them.

== Production ==
The show received a 13-episode direct-to-series order from Syfy on July 28, 2015. Each episode is based on a different genre of 1970s/1980s exploitation films, such as cannibals, nymphomaniacs, or insane asylums. Filming took place in Cape Town, South Africa.

== Reception ==
Blood Drive received generally favorable reviews from critics. On Rotten Tomatoes it has an approval rating of 76% based on reviews from 21 critics. On Metacritic it has a score of 65 out of 100 based on reviews from 13 critics.

Daniel Fienberg of The Hollywood Reporter gave the show a positive review, noting that the show "kept me entertained and curious for longer than I expected." Neil Genzlinger of The New York Times called it "a gleeful detour into grindhouse gore and raunch" and a sweatier, grimier and better-acted version of Death Race 2000. Alex McLevy of The A.V. Club was critical of the show and gave it a grade C, saying "If grindhouse TV wants to thrive in the medium, it needs to put its shocks and flesh in service of something more than a game of perpetual provocation and one-upmanship."

== See also ==
- Death Race
- Upír z Feratu, a film involving a car that uses blood for fuel
- Blood Car, a film about a car that uses blood for fuel
- Road Kill, film about a road train that uses a pulp made by grinding human bodies for fuel
- Twisted Metal, a video game franchise
