= Age of Samurai: Battle for Japan =

Canadian-American documentary television series

- Genre: Television documentary; Miniseries
- Directed by: Stephen Scott
- Starring: Masayoshi Haneda; Masami Kosaka; Hideaki Itō; Hayate Masao
- Narrated by: Hiro Kanagawa; Stephen Turnbull; David Spafford; Tomoko Kitagawa; Darren-Jon Ashmore
- Countries of origin: Canada; United States
- Original languages: English; Japanese
- No. of seasons: 1
- No. of episodes: 6

Production
- Producers: John Stead; Simon George; Kate Harrison
- Camera setup: Single-camera
- Running time: 43–45 minutes
- Production companies: Cream Productions; Blue Ant Media; Netflix

Original release
- Network: Netflix (International)
- Release: February 24, 2021

Age of Samurai: Battle for Japan is a Canadian-American documentary television series, distributed by Netflix and released on February 24, 2021. It takes place in feudal Japan from 1551 to 1616, during the final phase of the Sengoku period (The Age of Warring States), mainly the Azuchi–Momoyama period. It features reenactments of historical events and commentary by voice-over artist Hiro Kanagawa and historians Stephen Turnbull, David Spafford, Tomoko Kitagawa, Isaac Meyer and others. The story is about several powerful daimyo (feudal lords) who clash to unify Japan.

The series was produced by the Canadian firms Cream Productions and Blue Ant Media, for broadcast on Smithsonian Channel in Canada and Netflix internationally.

== Synopsis ==
Oda Nobunaga becomes head of the Oda clan upon the death of his father, but this causes problems with family members who compete for control. When Nobunaga conquers central Japan, he causes a war with the powerful daimyo Takeda Shingen. As Nobunaga's ambitions grow, one of his generals, Akechi Mitsuhide, becomes doubtful about his intentions and betrays him. Afterward, Toyotomi Hideyoshi becomes the de facto ruler of Japan. However, the young daimyo Date Masamune refuses to submit. After Hideyoshi unified Japan, he plots to expand his reign to China. Due to costly logistical issues and strong opposition, the campaign gets stuck in Korea. During the final months of Hideyoshi's life, he appoints five regents to govern until his young son Hideyori is old enough to assume power. However, the daimyo Tokugawa Ieyasu challenges the status quo and campaigns victoriously against his opponents, becoming the shogun of Japan that begins the Tokugawa shogunate that lasts for over 250 years.

== Cast ==
- Hiro Kanagawa – Narrator
- Stephen Turnbull – Narrator
- David Spafford – Narrator
- Tomoko Kitagawa – Narrator
- Darren-Jon Ashmore – Narrator
- Masami Kosaka – Toyotomi Hideyoshi
- Hayate Masao – Tokugawa Ieyasu
- Masayoshi Haneda – Oda Nobunaga
- Hideaki Itō – Date Masamune
- Wilfred Lee – Shibata Katsuie
- Michael Wert – Self
- Umi Bielmann – Young Iga Rebel
- Seiji Hino – Ishida Mitsunari
- Elina Miyake Jackson – Lady Nene
- Ryota Kaneko – Takeda Katsuyori
- Chika Kitney – Lady Chacha
- Simon Fletcher Li – Torii Mototada
- Timothy Mak – Sakuma Morimasa
- Kelly Seo – Lady Tsukiyama
- Frank Yim – Oda General

== Episodes ==
Episodes of Age of Samurai
No.	Title	Directed by	Original release date
1	"The Rise of Oda Nobunaga"	Stephen Scott	February 24, 2021
Japan is in a state of civil war as several warlords, called daimyo, lead their clans for control of territory. Oda Nobuhide, the daimyo of the Oda Clan from Owari Province, has died but not before naming his eldest son, Nobunaga, his heir. Nobunaga eventually defeats his familial rivals to reaffirm his control over the Oda clan and Owari province. Nobunaga's prodigious battle strategy and tactics lead his clan to defeating the much large and powerful Imagawa Clan that resulted in the death of the daimyo Imagawa Yoshimoto at the Battle of Okehazama. Nobunaga's victory gains him two very important allies that'll change the course of Japanese history; Toyotomi Hideyoshi and Tokugawa Ieyasu. Nobunaga begins his quest for the reunification of Japan.
2	"Seize Power/Retain Power"	Stephen Scott	February 24, 2021
Oda Nobunaga leads his clan on a campaign to unify Japan, controlling the central territories of Japan, including the Imperial capital of Kyoto. This includes eliminating the strong influence of the Buddha religion, specifically the Ikkō-ikki, a resistance movement based on the Jōdo Shinshū sect of Buddhism. Nobunaga leads his forces to Enryaku-ji temple on Mount Hiei, razing the temple and slaughtering thousands of innocent people. The Siege of Mount Hiei will have drastic repercussions for Nobunaga. As Nobunaga focuses on advancing through Western Japan, in Eastern Japan, Tokugawa Ieyasu's forces struggle against the Takeda Clan, one of the few clans strong enough to challenge the Oda. Outnumbered against the Takeda, Ieyasu requests reinforcements from Nobunaga, with the former threatening to betray the latter. The Oda victory at the Battle of Nagashino secures the Oda-Tokugawa alliance and makes Nobunaga the most powerful daimyo in Japan.
3	"The Demon King"	Stephen Scott	February 24, 2021
Nobunaga leads his armies to destroy the guerillas in Iga province. His legendary ruthlessness earns him the nickname "The Demon King", which draws ire from even some of his followers. One of Nobunaga's generals, Akechi Mitsuhide, has become disillusioned with Nobunaga and betrays him, causing the Honnō-ji Incident. The betrayal results in the death of Nobunaga, creating a power vacuum in Japan. One of Nobunaga's loyal generals, Toyotomi Hideyoshi, quickly fights and defeats Mitsuhide in the Battle of Yamazaki that results in Mitsuhide's death. Hideyoshi quickly sets out to eliminate Nobunaga's most loyal followers in order to seize authority over Nobunaga's territories.
4	"Enter the One-Eyed Dragon"	Stephen Scott	February 24, 2021
Hideyoshi defeats one of Nobunaga's longest-serving generals, Shibata Katsuie at the Battle of Shizugatake. Hideyoshi then clashes with Tokugawa Ieyasu, but the conflict reaches a stalemate, resulting in the two forming a new alliance. To legitimize his rule, Hideyoshi fabricates a new lineage to the Imperial Court to become prime minister. Hideyoshi then looks to Northern Japan to unify the country, coming into conflict with Date Masamune. Known as the "One-Eyed Dragon", Masamune leads his clan against his rivals to control Northern Japan. Despite resisting, Masamune eventually submits to Hideyoshi's rule after his victory over the Hōjō clan at the Siege of Odawara. At long last, Japan is unified under the rule of Hideyoshi.
5	"Catastrophe and Annihilation"	Stephen Scott	February 24, 2021
Now ruler of a unified Japan, Hideyoshi seeks to become the most powerful man in Asia by invading and controlling China. But first he must go through Korea, initiating the Japanese invasions of Korea (1592-1598). The Korean campaign becomes costly for Hideyoshi, and coupled with the loss of several of his relatives and an attempted coup soon becomes mad. With the birth of his second son Toyotomi Hideyori and his declining health, Hideyoshi appoints a council of five of his most powerful daimyo to rule Japan until Hideyori becomes of age. Hideyoshi passes away in 1598 and the council ends the Korean campaigns. Tokugawa Ieyasu, having served under Oda Nobunaga and Toyotomi Hideyoshi for nearly 40 years, now makes his move to finally take control of Japan.
6	"End of Days"	Stephen Scott	February 24, 2021
With Toyotomi Hideyoshi dead, a council of Japan's five most powerful daimyo now leads Japan. Among them is Tokugawa Ieyasu, in charge of governmental affairs and the elderly Maeda Toshiie, in charge of raising and educating Toyotomi Hideyori. Toshiie is approached by a daimyo named Ishida Mitsunari, a Toyotomi loyalist who wants to eliminate Ieyasu to prevent him from usurping Hideyori. Nearing death and believing a conflict against Ieyasu will go badly, Toshiie refuses. When Toshiie passes away, Ieyasu immediately takes charge of Hideyori's upbringing. This angers the rest of the council and orders Ieyasu to back off, but Ieyasu sees this as a declaration of war. In 1600, the Tokugawa and Ishida armies clash at the Battle of Sekigahara. Initially an even fight, the tide turns in Ieyeasu's favor due to Kobayakawa Hideaki betraying Mitsunari (Mitsunari was partly responsible for Hideaki being stripped of several privileges during the Korean invasions). The victory gives Ieyasu ultimate control of Japan, and in 1603 is bestowed the title of Shogun, beginning the Tokugawa shogunate. In 1615, a grown Hideyori leads an army against the Tokugawa to claim leadership of Japan. The Tokugawa and its allies defeat the Toyotomi coalition at the Siege of Osaka, resulting in Hideyori's death. Ieyasu passes away in 1616, but the Tokugawa shogunate will go on to rule Japan and hold the peace for more than 250 years.

== Awards ==
The series received three Canadian Screen Award nominations at the 9th Canadian Screen Awards in 2021, for Best Factual Program or Series, Best Production Design/Art Direction in a Non-Fiction Program or Series (Florian Schuck for the episode "The Rise of Nobunaga") and Best Direction in a Factual Program or Series (Stephen Scott for "The Rise of Nobunaga").
