= Thando Thabethe =

South African actress and radio personality

- Born: Thando Thabethe; 18 June 1990 (age 36); Johannesburg, Gauteng, South Africa
- Other names: Thando Thabooty, Thabooty
- Education: Mondeor High School
- Alma mater: University of Johannesburg
- Occupations: Actress; playwright; radio DJ; TV presenter
- Years active: 2003–present
- Known for: 5FM radio DJ and host; Generations: The Legacy; How to Ruin Christmas
- Website: thandothabethe.com

Thando Thabethe (born 18 June 1990) is a South African actress, and Radio DJ who was the presenter for the television show Thando Bares All on channel TLC and current drive time host on 947. She is Nivea's first brand ambassador in Africa. In 2019, Thando was named one of Forbes Africa's 30 Under 30. She is also the host of 947 Drive With Thando.

== Early life and education ==
Thabethe was born in Johannesburg, Gauteng. She attended Mondeor High School. In 2018, she was invited by the school she graduated from to give a speech to the grade 12 pupils ahead of their final matric exams.

After completing her secondary school education, Thando proceeded to study at the University of Johannesburg, where she graduated with a Bachelor of Commerce (BCom.) Accounting degree in 2011. Thabethe lived with her mother alone for most of her teenage years as her father had died when she was 13 years old.

Thabethe took part in theatre productions during her teenage years before getting her first TV role when she was 14 years old. She also took part in theatre productions at UJ Arts Centre whilst in the university and worked at UJFM, a community radio station based at the University of Johannesburg, starting as news reader and later as a radio DJ.

== Career ==
=== 2008–2013: Early life ===
Thabethe started her radio career in 2008 at UJFM before moving to popular youth radio station YFM in 2011 whilst she was in her final year of studies. At the same time she played the lead role of Thando Nkosi in the sitcom My Perfect Family, which went on to air for 3 seasons. She later joined 5FM in 2013 on The Roger Goode Show. Other prominent work include, Club 808, Intersexions, Ngempela, Kowethu, 1s and 2s, and Single Guys.

=== 2014–2017: Generations: The Legacy, NIVEA, The Thabooty Drive ===
She played the role of Nolwazi Buzo on Generations:The Legacy, a South African soap opera, from 2014 to 2017. In 2014, Thabethe was appointed as a Nivea brand ambassador, making her the first African brand ambassador is for the German body-care brand. After joining 5FM, in 2016 she hosted her own show on weekdays, The Thando Thabooty Show, then The Thabooty Drive in 2017. In 2016 she starred in her first ever feature film Mrs Right Guy alongside Dineo Moeketsi, Thapelo Mokoena and Lehasa Moloi.

In 2016, she hosted the South African Music Awards, alongside Somizi Mhlongo and in 2017 she hosted the South African Film and Television Awards.

=== 2018–2020: Housekeepers, exit from 5FM ===
Thabethe started her television talk show Thando Bares All, on TLC with the first episode being aired on 2 June 2018.

In 2018, she later starred in the thriller, drama series Housekeepers as Linda Ndlovu. She maintained her role in the season 2 of the series in 2019. In 2019, she starred in the lead role of Zinhle Malinga in the box office hit Love Lives Here .

In 2019, she was nominated for Best TV Host and Best Talk Show for Thando Bares All, which aired on TLC, she was subsequently awarded Best Talk Show.

After working at 5FM for five years, Thabethe resigned in March 2020. She hosted her final Thabooty show on the station on 5 March 2020. She later shared her reasons for quitting on Twitter on 7 April 2020.

=== 2021-present: 947 ===
Following the exit of DJ Fresh from 947, Thabete took over the drive time slot at 3pm on 23 March 2021.

On 12 May 2022 she was announced as the judge of Miss South Africa 2022.

== Personal life ==
Thando's father died when she was in grade 8 at the age of 13. She also lost her brother Sibu Thabethe, who was shot dead in an armed robbery in 2015.

== Awards ==
| Year | Association | Category | Nominated work | Result | Ref. |
|---|---|---|---|---|---|
| 2022 | DStv Mzansi Viewers Choice Awards | Favourite Radio Personality | | Won | |
| 2023 | South African Film and Television Awards | TV Comedy | Best Actress (How to Ruin Christmas) | Won | |

== Filmography ==
=== Film roles ===
| Year | Film | Role | Notes |
|---|---|---|---|
| 2019 | Love Lives Here | Zinhle Malinga | Lead role |
| 2016 | Mrs Right Guy | Anna | Supporting role |

=== Television ===
| Year | Film | Role | Notes |
|---|---|---|---|
| 2008–2010 | My Perfect Family (season 1–3) | Thando Nkosi | Lead (Sitcom) |
| 2010 | Single Guys | Evette | Support (Sitcom) |
| 2010 | Intersexions | Lulu | Support (Drama) |
| 2013 | 'Kowethu | Sazi | Lead (Drama) |
| 2014 | Mzansi Love | Josephine | Lead (Drama) |
| 2014-2017 | Generations: The Legacy | Nolwazi Buzo | Lead (Soapie) |
| 2018 | Thando Bares All | Herself | Presenter (Talk Show) |
| 2018 - present | Housekeepers (season 1–3) | Linda | Lead (Thriller/Drama) |
| 2020 | Blood Psalms | The Emissary of Heka | Support (Thriller) |
| 2020 | How to Ruin Christmas: The Wedding | Beauty Sello | Lead(Romantic Comedy) |
| 2020 | Reyka | Nandi Cele | Lead (Crime-drama) |
| 2023 | Unstoppable:Thabooty | Her self | Reality show |
| 2023 | My Dad the Bounty Hunter | Adja | Guest (Animation Series) |
