= Above & Below =

- Theatrical release poster
- Directed by: Jesse V. Johnson
- Written by: Tony Giordano
- Produced by: David Hillary; Carmen Aguado; Manu Vega; Frank Ariza
- Starring: Laura Marano; Antonio Banderas; Christina Ochoa; Timothy V. Murphy; Louis Mandylor; Jess Liaudin
- Cinematography: Maxime Alexandre
- Edited by: Matthew Lorentz
- Music by: Maria Vertiz
- Production companies: AF Films; Match Point
- Distributed by: Aura Entertainment (United States); Youplanet Distribution (Spain)
- Release dates: July 29, 2026 (United States); September 18, 2026 (Spain)
- Running time: 96 minutes
- Countries: United States; Spain
- Language: English

Above & Below is a 2026 American horror action thriller film directed by Jesse V. Johnson and written by Tony Giordano. It stars Laura Marano, Antonio Banderas, Christina Ochoa, Timothy V. Murphy, Louis Mandylor, and Jess Liaudin.

The film was released in the United States on July 29, 2026.

== Plot ==
Five friends go on vacation in Mexico for partying and diving. During a shark-diving excursion, they discover cartel cocaine, which puts them in the crosshairs of armed criminals. Tatiana (Laura Marano) and Kaley end up trapped in a shark cage underwater, and the cartel forces them to retrieve a bag of drugs from the ocean floor.

That leaves them caught between two threats: great white sharks below them and armed criminals waiting above. With their air running out, Tatiana has to figure out how to survive, protect her friends, and outsmart the criminals. That “danger above and danger below” is where the title comes from.

== Cast ==
- Laura Marano as Tatiana
- Antonio Banderas as Burns
- Christina Ochoa
- Timothy V. Murphy
- Louis Mandylor
- Jess Liaudin
- Diego Llinás
- Donncha Tynan as TJ
- Ryan Bertroche
- Ramiro Alonso
- Rodrigo Poisón
- Mario Tardón

== Production ==
Principal photography had wrapped by late 2025 in Spain, on a horror thriller film directed by Jesse V. Johnson and written by Tony Giordano, with Laura Marano and Antonio Banderas in the lead roles. Christina Ochoa, Timothy V. Murphy, Louis Mandylor, Jess Liaudin, Diego Llinás, Ryan Bertroche, Ramiro Alonso, Rodrigo Poisón, and Mario Tardón had rounded out the cast.

== Release ==
Above & Below was released in the United States on July 29, 2026. The film was then released in Spain on digital on September 18, by Youplanet Distribution.

== Reception ==
On the review aggregator website Rotten Tomatoes, 46% of 13 critics' reviews are positive, with an average rating of 5.50/10.

Robert Kojder of Flickering Myth gave the film a negative feedback and a rating of 2 out of 5 and he wrote: It’s better than some recent low-budget shark flicks, but still a tediously frustrating, nonsensical, sometimes boring experience.

Brian Orndorf of Blu-ray.com gave the film a negative review and a rating of "C" and he wrote: A little different from the usual in this type of feature, but Giordano doesn’t supply much imagination for screen tension, leaving the movie lacking in excitement for far too long.

Joshua Ryan of FandomWire also gave the film a negative review and a rating of 4 out of 10 and wrote: Above & Below is intermittently fun, but far more eye-roll-inducing.

However, Emilie Black of Cinema Crazed gave the film a positive feedback, and said: "Above & Below is a decent, albeit familiar, shark thriller..."
