= Craig Jackson (actor) =

South African actor

- Born: Craig Alan Jackson; 30 October 1979 (age 46); South Africa
- Education: South African School of Film, Television and Dramatic Art
- Occupations: Actor, producer, director, voice artist
- Years active: 2002–present
- Height: 1.75 m (5 ft 9 in)

Craig Alan Jackson (born 30 October 1979), is a South African actor and voice artist. He is best known for the roles in the television series Black Sails and Blood Drive.

== Career ==
In 2001, he graduated from South African School of Film, Television and Dramatic Art (Afda) with a BA Honours. He became the MNET Student of the year and AFDA's Best Actor for 3 years. In the same year, he produced and performed in Got It Maid!. Some of his popular stage plays include Goya (2002), It's Funny When You're Dead, Who Digs Who!, Playboys.

In 2009, he worked as the production designer for the blockbuster American horror film The Unborn directed by David S. Goyer. Meanwhile, he played the role 'Mr Wren' in the world's longest running stage play, Agatha Christie's Mousetrap.

In 2014, he played the role 'Cliff' in SYFY's Grindhouse series, Blood Drive. He has also appeared in the feature films Stander and District 9. In August 2020, he starred in the comedy film Seriously Single co-directed by Katleho Ramaphakela and Rethabile Ramaphakela. It was released on 31 July 2020, on Netflix.

His most popular role came through the international STARZ television series, Black Sails. He played the role of Mr. Augustus Featherstone, Quartermaster of the Colonial Dawn under Jack Rackham. He joined the show in the second season and stayed through the fourth and final season.

== Filmography ==
=== Film ===
| Year | Title | Role | Notes | Ref. |
|---|---|---|---|---|
| 2003 | Stander | Traffic Jam Cop | | |
| 2009 | The Unborn | —N/a | Production designer | |
| 2009 | District 9 | MNU Guard | | |
| 2020 | Seriously Single | Nick | | |
| 2022 | Silverton Siege | Priest | | |
| 2025 | Novocaine | Nigel | | |

=== Television ===
| Year | Title | Role | Notes | Ref. |
|---|---|---|---|---|
| 2013 | Donkerland | English Officer | | |
| 2014 | Kota Life Crisis | Gaylard | | |
| 2015–2017 | Black Sails | Augustus Featherstone | 24 episodes | |
| 2017 | Blood Drive | Cliff | 4 episodes | |
| 2018 | Origin | Volunteer Ed | | |
| 2020 | Grant | General Henry Halleck | 2 episodes | |
| 2020 | Inconceivable | David Stein | 4 episodes | |
| 2023 | 1923 | Merchant Marine | 2 episodes | |
