= Sonia Mbele =

South African actress

- Born: Sonia Nomthandazo Mbele; 11 December 1976 (age 49); Natalspruit, South Africa
- Occupations: Television producer, actress, entrepreneur
- Employer: Sonia Mbele Films
- Known for: Generations, The Real Housewives of Johannesburg

Sonia Mbele is a South African actress, model, TV producer and entrepreneur. She produced the first ever Real Housewives franchise in Africa, and is the executive producer for The Real Housewives of Johannesburg.

== Early life ==
Sonia Mbele was born in December 1976 in Natalspruit, South Africa.

== Career ==
Mbele began her career in 1998 as a lead act in an SABC 2 drama production that was called Phamokate and in 1999 she was awarded at the FNB Vita Award for Most Promising New Actress. In 2003, Mbele was cast in SABC 1 soap series Generations through which she rose to prominence in South Africa, she played her role as Ntombi Khumalo up to 2011. In 2009, Mbele won the Golden Horn Award for Best Actress in a TV Soap at the South African Film and Television Awards.

Mbele became the first black celebrity to be named face of Dark & Lovely, Lux, and Sun-Silk in South Africa.

In 2018, Mbele brought the first The Real Housewives franchise to Africa which premiered in South Africa as The Real Housewives of Johannesburg through her company Sonia Mbele Films, then in 2021, she created another reality TV series called Pastor’s Wives for HONEY TV.

== Filmography ==
=== Film ===
Year	Title	Role	Notes
2001	Mr Bones	Thandie	
2003	God Is African		
2017	Meet the Radebes	Sam	Script writer, producer
2019	Blessers	Michelle Zulu	

=== Television ===
Year	Title	Role	Notes
1998	Phamokate		SABC 2
2001	Soul City	Dr. Ayanda Ngubane	Season 5 and 6
2003–2011	Generations	Ntombi Khumalo	Season 1–13, SABC 1
	Yizo Yizo	Zakes' Girlfriend	
2003	Soul Buddyz	Ayanda	Season 2
2004	Zero Tolerance	Rosie	Season 1
2015	Gold Diggers	Thuli	Season 1
2016	The Alliance	Lydia	Season 1
2016	Keeping Score	Mmamosa Letsie	Season 1
2016	Greed & Desire	Thlabi	Season 1
2017	Soap on a Rope	Tuki Ramphele	Season 1
2017	iNumber Number	Philane	Season 1
2018	Imposter	Big Daddy	Season 2
2020	Family Secrets	Cleopatra Mokwena	Season 1
2021	DiepCity	Zola	Season 1
2022	Blood & Water	Lisbeth Molapo	Season 3
