= Yonda Thomas =

South African actor (born 1985)

- Born: Yonda Thomas; 1 December 1985 (age 40); Mthatha, South Africa
- Occupation: Actor
- Years active: 2016–present
- Spouse: Taz Emerans

Yonda Thomas (born 1 December 1985) is a South African actor. He is best known for the roles in the films and television serials: Seriously Single, Mrs Right Guy, The Jakes Are Missing and Happiness ever after.

== Personal life ==
He was born on 1 December 1985 in Mthatha, Eastern Cape, South Africa. He was raised by a single mother.

He is married to Taz Emerans, a medical doctor.

== Career ==
He obtained a bachelor's degree in Public Administration. After graduating, he moved to Johannesburg in 2008 to become a diplomat. However, during this period, he participated in SABC 1's acting competition 'Class Act' under the guidance of one of his friends. Later he got the opportunity to play the leading role in drama series Fallen telecast in SABC 1. His maiden acting came through the television series Wild at Heart in 2011. In the serial, he played the role 'Matthew'. In 2015, he played the role 'Detective Miles' in the film The Jakes Are Missing. In 2016, he joined the SABC 3 series Isidingo, with the role 'police officer Majola'.

In August 2020, he starred in the sex comedy film Seriously Single co-directed by Katleho Ramaphakela and Rethabile Ramaphakela. It was released on 31 July 2020 on Netflix.

== Partial filmography ==
Year	Film	Role	Genre	Ref.
2011	Wild at Heart	Matthew	TV series	
2013	Previously on Childrens Hospital Africa		Video short	
2015	The Jakes Are Missing	Detective Miles	Film	
2016	Mrs Right Guy	Lesego the Stripper	Film	
2016	Doubt	Sanele	TV series	
2017	Madiba	Nelson – Teen	TV mini-series	
2020	Isidingo: The Need	Detective Majola	Soap Opera	
2020	How to Ruin Christmas: The Wedding	Khaya Manqele	TV series	
2020	Seriously Single	Max	Film	
2021	Happiness ever after	Yonda	Film	
2021	Generations: The Legacy	Lelethu Malinga	Soap Opera	
2022	Redemption	Detective Sabelo	Daily drama	
2026	One Piece Season 2	Igaram	TV series	
