= Mojak Lehoko =

South African comedian

- Born: Mojakisane Lehoko; Johannesburg, South Africa
- Occupations: Actor, comedian, writer
- Years active: 2009–present
- Website: https://www.mojaklehoko.com

Mojakisane 'Mojak' Lehoko, is a South African actor, comedian and scriptwriter.

== Personal life ==
He was born and raised in Johannesburg, South Africa.

== Career ==
He started stand-up comedy acting at 'Cool Runnings' in Melville in 2009, and his shows have featured at the Grahamstown Arts Festival. Also known as 'The Underground', 'Cool Runnings' was the longest running comedy club in South Africa. Due to his success as a stand-up comedian, he was able to perform in numerous comedy clubs all over South Africa such as 'Parker's Comedy & Jive' (Johannesburg), 'Tings & Times' (Pretoria), 'Zula' (Cape Town) and 'Jou Ma Se Comedy Club' (Cape Town).

Then he was nominated for a Comic's choice award for the television show Late Nite News with Loyiso Gola. He also wrote the script of the show. He was nominated for an International Emmy for the show as well. He was also nominated in the Newcomer category in the inaugural Comics Choice awards.

He produced the popular television serials: The Real Jozi A-Listers, Ekasi stories and the sitcom Abomzala telecast on SABC. As a stand-up comedian, he staged one man show How Did I Get Here which became highly popular in South Africa. He then made the television series The Bantu Hour, which later nominated at the South African Film and Television Award (SAFTAs). In 2017, he became a multiple Comics Choice Awards nominee and winner of the Comics Pen Award for best writer. In the television, he worked as the host of popular programs Newsish and Woza Kleva. Then he appeared in the comedy show As a People aired in Comedy Central. Meanwhile, he made his maiden film appearance in the film Wonderboy For President directed by John Barker.

In August 2020, he appeared in the comedy film Seriously Single with a minor role. It was released on July 31, 2020 on Netflix.

== Television credits ==
- Ekhasi Stories – ‘Wannabe’ – ETV (writer)
- The Real Jozi A-Listers – VuzuAmp (writer)
- Abomzala – SABC (writer)
- South African Insurance Association Sketch Series – Next of Next Week (writer)
- Opening Guys – Mzansi Magic (comedian)
- Late Nite News with Loyiso Gola – Season 1 to Season 5, ETV (writer & cast member)
- Laugh Out Loud (Part of the improvised comedy Troupe) – Mzansi Magic (improviser)
- Ses’Topla - SABC 1 (actor)
- The Roast of Helen Zille – Showmax (writer)
