= Fulu Mugovhani =

South African actress (born 1990)

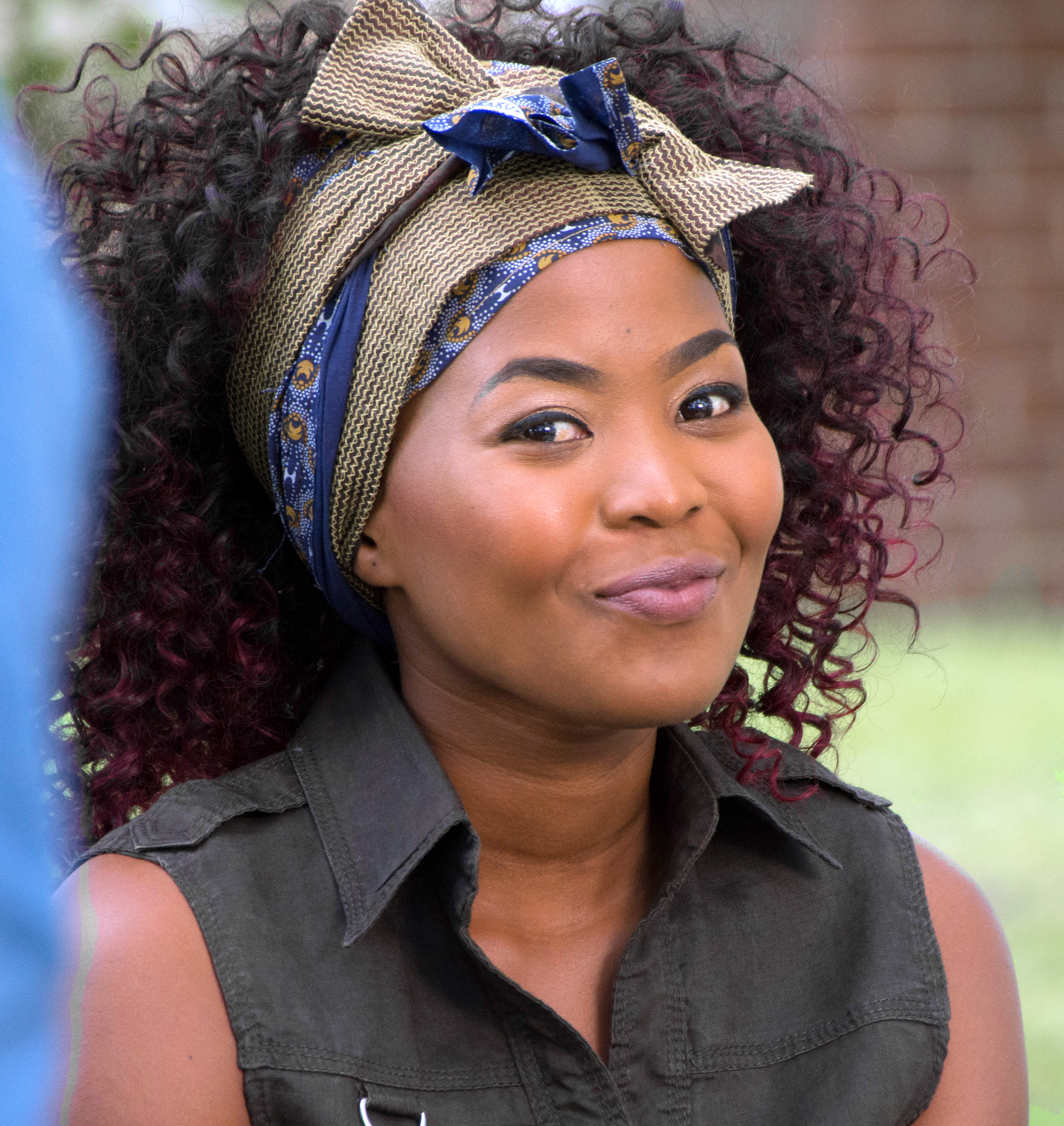
- Mugovhani in 2016
- Born: 7 September 1990 (age 35); Thohoyandou, Venda
- Education: Tshwane University of Technology
- Occupation: Actor
- Notable work: Scandal!
- Spouse: Tumi Modibedi aka Miza

Fulu Mugovhani (born 7 September 1990 in Thohoyandou) is a South African actress. In 2015, she starred in Ayanda as the title character, a role that earned her many accolades and nominations including the Africa Movie Academy Awards, South African Film and Television Awards, and Africa International Film Festival awards.

== Personal life ==
Mugovhani was born in Thohoyandou, a town in the Limpopo province of South Africa. She studied musical theatre at Tshwane University of Technology, where her father taught, finishing her degree in 2011. She married her sweetheart, Tumi Modibedi, who works as a DJ and record producer, in June 2018.

== Career ==
In 2012, Mugovhani joined an international production of the musical The Lion King, produced by Hong Kong Disneyland, in the role of Nala. For the production and performances, she moved to Hong Kong for a year and a half. In 2013, she landed her first role in television, acting in the mini-series Remix, as well as acting in the soap opera Scandal!.

In 2015, Mugovhani starred in the lead role of the movie Ayanda, directed by Sara Blecher. This role earned her many accolades, including the Best Actress in a leading role award at the 12th Africa Movie Academy Awards, the Best Actress in a feature film award at the 10th South African Film and Television Awards, and the Best Actress award at the 2015 Africa International Film Festival. At the 2016 Africa Magic Viewers' Choice Awards, she was nominated for Best Actress in a Drama, but didn't win.

In 2017, Mugovhani had a recurring role in the soap opera Isidingo on SABC 3. Also, in the same year, she starred in the soap opera Ring of Lies in the role of Rendani, a Musangwe fighter who pursues her dream of becoming a champion boxer, despite her conservative father's desires. In 2020, after a hiatus of a year, she starred in the series Still Breathing, where she portrayed a mother and wife for the first time, and in the South African comedy film Seriously Single.

Mugovhani has said in an interview that there is a difference performing on stage and on screen, needing to project her voice differently. This challenged her when she transitioned from theatre to television and film, as well as made it hard for her to be able to perform on stage after filming.

== Filmography ==
- Remix (2013)
- Scandal! (2013)
- Ayanda (2015) as Ayanda Olandele
- Happiness Is a Four-Letter Word (2016) as Lindiwe
- The Lucky Specials (2017) as Zwanga
- Isidingo (2017)
- Ring of Lies (2017)
- Still Breathing (2020) as Noli
- Seriously Single (2020) as Dineo
- One Night kwa Mxolisi (2021) as Funi
- Umakoti Wethu (2021) as Khathu
- Burns and Song (2024) as Risimu

== Awards and nominations ==
Year	Association	Category	Work	Result	Ref
2015	12th Africa Movie Academy Awards	Best Actress in a leading role	Ayanda	Won	
2015	South African Film and Television Awards	Best Actress in a feature film	Ayanda	Won	
2015	Africa International Film Festival	Best Actress	Ayanda	Won	
2016	Africa Magic Viewers Choice Awards	Best Actress in a Drama	Ayanda	Nominated	
