= Tumi Morake =

South African actress

- Born: Tumi Morake; 22 December 1981 (age 44); Free State, South Africa
- Education: Wits University
- Occupations: comedian; actress; TV personality; writer
- Spouse: Mpho Osei Tutu
- Children: 3
- Website: https://www.tumimorake.co.za/

Tumi Morake (born 22 December 1981) is a South African comedian, actress, TV personality, and writer.

In 2018, she became the first African woman to have her own set on Netflix. She is also known to be the first woman to host Comedy Central Presents in Africa.

== Early years and education ==
Morake was born in the Free State. She relocated to Gauteng in the year 2000 and there, she studied Drama at Wits University.

== Career ==
After completing her tertiary education at Wits, Morake began working at Arepp Theatre for Life, a touring educational theatre company. In July 2005, she entered the comedy industry. She has worked at Parker Leisure Management and performs regular stand-up gigs in Johannesburg and Pretoria. Some of the comedy festivals she has performed at include Heavyweights Comedy Jam, Blacks Only, Have a Heart, Just Because Comedy Festival, The Tshwane Comedy Festival, The Lifestyle SA Festival and Old Mutual Comedy Encounters. She has hosted shows including Our Perfect Wedding, Red Cake and WTFTumi (her talk show).

== Filmography ==
Morake has starred in several films and TV shows, including:

- Skin
- Kota Life Crisis
- Soul Buddyz
- Izoso Connexion
- High Rollers
- Laugh Out Loud
- Rockville
- Soul Buddyz
- The Queen
- The Bantu Hour
- ekasi movies
- Seriously Single
- Tumi or Not Tumi (Netflix)
- Kizazi Moto: Generation Fire (Disney+)

== Works ==
- Morake is the author of a book titled And Then Mama Said.

== Awards and recognitions ==
- Morake was named as one of The Free State Province's Icons
- 2012- Awarded Entertainer of the Year at the 2012 Speakers of Note Award
- 2013 - She is a recipient of the Mboko Women in the Arts Award for Excellence in Comedy 2013
- 2016 - She won the Best Comedian Category of the YOU Spectacular Awards
- She won awarded the Savanna Comic Choice Awards as the Comic of the Year

== Personal life ==
Morake is married to Mpho Osei Tutu, a fellow South African actor, and is the mother of three children.
