= Seriously Single =

2020 film

- Film poster
- Directed by: Katleho Ramaphakela; Rethabile Ramaphakela
- Written by: Lwazi Mvusi
- Produced by: Rethabile Ramaphakela
- Starring: Fulu Mugovhani; Tumi Morake; Bohang Moeko
- Production company: Burnt Onion Productions
- Distributed by: Netflix
- Release date: July 31, 2020
- Running time: 107 minutes
- Country: South Africa
- Languages: English; Zulu; Afrikaans; Tswana

Seriously Single is a 2020 South African film directed by Katleho Ramaphakela and Rethabile Ramaphakela, written by Lwazi Mvusi and starring Fulu Mugovhani, Tumi Morake and Bohang Moeko.

== Cast ==
- Fulu Mugovhani as Dineo
- Tumi Morake as Noni
- Bohang Moeko as Lunga
- Yonda Thomas as Max
- Tiffany Barbuzano as Pam
- Lihle Dhlomo as Gugu
- Craig Jackson as Nick
- Connie Chiume as Dineo's Mom
- Wayne Van Rooyen as Timothy
- Thabo Malema as Delivery Man
- Mpho Osei Tutu as Hotel Receptionist
- Mthunzi Ntoyi as Security Guard
- Kabomo Vilakazi as Pastor
- DJ Fresh as Himself
- Katleho Ramaphakela as Tebza
- Mojak Lehoko as Club Guy

== Release ==
Seriously Single was released on July 31, 2020 on Netflix.
