= Owen Sejake =

South African actor

- Born: Owen Lebakeng Sejake; Daveyton, Gauteng, South Africa
- Occupation: Actor
- Years active: 1971–present
- Notable work: Tsotsi, Beat the Drum, Empini, Yizo Yizo

Owen Lebakeng Sejake (born 1950) is a South African stage, film, and television actor known for his roles in Tsotsi (2005), Beat the Drum (2003), and several acclaimed local television dramas including Yizo Yizo, Zone 14, and Empini. He has worked across theatre, film, and television for over five decades and is recognised as one of South Africa;s veteran actors.

== Early life ==
Sejake was born in 1950 in the township of Daveyton in Ekurhuleni Metropolitan Municipality, Gauteng, South Africa. He began his acting career in 1971 and saw it as a way of taking part in the struggle against apartheid.

== Career ==
=== Theatre ===
Sejake's theatre career spans numerous acclaimed productions. He has performed in works such as Death and the King's Horseman by Wole Soyinka and The Captain's Tiger by Athol Fugard. His other theater credits include Ipi Tombi I & II, Milestones, Marabi, and Prophets in the Sky. In interviews, he has reflected on the evolution of South African theatre and the importance of storytelling in the post-apartheid era.

=== Film ===
Sejake gained international attention for his film roles. He portrayed Nobe in Beat the Drum (2003) and Gumboot Dlamini in the Academy Award–winning film Tsotsi (2005), directed by Gavin Hood. His filmography also includes Hijack Stories (2000), Mandela and De Klerk (1997), Country of My Skull (2004), Knuckle City (2019), and Shot Down (1999).

=== Television ===
Sejake has appeared in a range of South African television series, including Yizo Yizo, Ke Nako, Soul City, Zone 14, and Fallen.

In 2009, he portrayed President Nkosi in the second season of 90 Plein Street. In 2024, he joined the Showmax political drama Empini as General Moeti.

== Acting style and influence ==
Sejake is fluent in multiple South African languages, including Sesotho, Setswana, isiZulu, isiXhosa, Afrikaans, and English.

He is known for portraying both township characters and national figures, and has been described as a bridge between older theatrical traditions and contemporary South African storytelling.

== Awards and recognition ==
- Best Supporting Actor Award at the Monaco International Film Festival for Beat the Drum (2003).
- Vita Award nominations for Best Actor in a Musical (Once on This Island, 1993) and Best Supporting Actor (Marabi, 1996).

== Personal life ==
In a 2017 interview with TimesLIVE, Sejake stated that he has avoided scandals throughout his career by focusing on his work and family life. Sejake also commented on tensions between veteran and younger actors, urging collaboration and mentorship within the industry.

== Selected filmography ==
=== Film ===
- Beat the Drum (2003) – Nobe
- Tsotsi (2005) – Gumboot Dlamini
- Hijack Stories (2000) – Bra Dan
- Knuckle City (2019)
- Country of My Skull (2004)
- Mandela and De Klerk (1997)

=== Television ===
- Yizo Yizo (SABC 1)
- Ke Nake
- Soul City
- Zone 14
- Fallen
- 90 Plein Street (2009) – President Nkosi
- Empini (2024) – General Moeti

== Legacy ==
With a career spanning over fifty years, Sejake is considered one of South Africa's most respected veteran actors.His performances in socially conscious dramas and films have contributed to South Africa's post-apartheid cultural landscape, inspiring a new generation of performers.
