= Motlatsi Mafatshe =

South African actor and musician

- Born: Motlatsi Mafatshe; 3 April 1983 (age 43); Soweto, South Africa
- Other name: Mo
- Occupations: Actor, musician, director, producer
- Years active: 2005–present
- Spouse: Millicent Nkangane (m. 2014)

Motlatsi Mafatshe (born 3 April 1983) is a South African actor and musician. He is best known for his roles in the popular films State of Violence, Sokhulu &Partners II and Zama Zama. Apart from acting, he is also a musician who has made more than 400 singles.

== Personal life ==
He was born in 1984 in Soweto, South Africa to a political family.

He is married to Millicent Nkangane, a fashion designer since November 2014. They first met in a church.

== Career ==
He played the role 'Sechaba' on the popular SABC 3 soapie Isidingo first in 2010. After playing the role for more than nine years, he finally joined officially for the show's directing team in 2018. In 2019, he won the award for the Outstanding Lead Actor award at the Third Royalty Soapie Awards.

He also played the role as 'Wandile Dhlomo' in the soccer drama Shooting Stars. Then he appeared with the role 'Casper' on the series When We Were Black. In 2018, he co-produced the romcom Love Lives Here.

On 3 February 2006, he was attacked by hip hop artist Thulani Ngcobo aka 'Pitch Black Afro' at the South African premiere party for television movie Tsotsi.

== Filmography ==
Year	Film	Role	Genre	Ref.
2005	Elalini	Moses	Video short	
2007	When We Were Black	Casper	TV series	
2007	Brothers in Arms: 1978	Dalgado	Film	
2008	uGugu no Andile	Mxolisi	TV series	
2010	Wild at Heart	David Kagona	TV series	
2010	Isidingo	Sechaba	TV series	
2010	State of Violence	Chappies	Film	
2011	Sokhulu and Partners II	Litha Zwane	TV series	
2011	Otelo Burning	Blade	Film	
2012	Gog' Helen	Garbage boy	Film	
2012	Zama Zama	Benjamin	Film	
2013	Fanie Fourie's Lobola	Mandla	Film	
2013	Single Guys	Taps	TV series	
2015	Zaziwa		TV series	
2016	Mrs Right Guy	Traffic Cop	Film	
2018	Emoyeni		TV mini-series	
2020	How to ruin Christmas, The Wedding	Themba Thwala	TV mini-series	
2021	House of zwide	Molefe	TV series	
2023	Piet's Sake 2	Melusi	Film	
