= Rethabile Ramaphakela =

South African actress and filmmaker (born 1987)

- Born: Rethabile Ramaphakela; 13 April 1987 (age 38); South Africa
- Occupations: Actress, filmmaker, producer, director, writer
- Years active: 2009–present
- Relatives: Katleho Ramaphakela (brother); Tshepo Ramaphakela (brother)

Rethabile Ramaphakela (born 13 April 1987) is a South African filmmaker, film producer and actress. She is best known as the director and producer of popular television serials and films Seriously Single, the Netflix Original "How to Ruin Christmas", Bedford Wives and The Bang Bang Club.

== Personal life ==
She was born on 13 April 1987 in South Africa. She has two brothers: Tshepo and Katleho.

== Career ==
She started her career as a KTV presenter. Along with her two brothers, Rethabile co-founded the film production company 'Burnt Onion' in 2010. In 2014, she made a supportive role in the international film The Bang Bang Club. Then in the company produced the television sitcom My Perfect Family, telecast on SABC1 in 2015. After successful airing of the sitcom, she produced the short films like Goodbye Thokoza based on the wars in Thokoza in the 1980s. After the success of the sitcom, she produced the television serials Thuli no Thulani, Kota Life Crisis and Check Coast through the production house.

In August 2020, she directed the comedy film Seriously Single with her brother Katleho Ramaphakela. It was released on 31 July 2020 on Netflix.

== Filmography ==
Year	Film	Role	Genre	Ref.
2010	The Bang Bang Club	Actress: Woman Reporter Three	Film	
2014	Check Coast	Writer	TV series	
2015	My Perfect Family	Executive producer, script editor	TV series	
2017	Bedford Wives	Executive producer	TV series	
2020	Seriously Single	Director, executive producer	Film	
