= Katleho Ramaphakela =

South African actor and filmmaker

- Born: Katleho Ramaphakela; South Africa
- Occupations: Actor, director, producer
- Years active: 2009–present
- Relatives: Rethabile Ramaphakela (sister); Tshepo Ramaphakela (brother)

Katleho Ramaphakela, is a South African filmmaker, film producer and actor. He is best known as the director and producer of popular television serials and films Check Coast, Thulani No Thuli and Seriously Single.

== Personal life ==
He has one brother: Tshepo and one sister: Rethabile.

== Career ==
Along with his brother and sister, Rethabile co-founded the film production company 'Burnt Onion' in 2010. In 2012, he played the role 'Thami' in the SABC1 drama series Intersexions and in which he later nominated for a SAFTA Award in the category Best Actor in a Drama Series. He produced the SABC1 sitcoms My Perfect Family, Thuli noThulani, and Vuzu mockumentary Check-Coast through the production house.

Other than production, he then appeared in popular television sitcoms and serials such as Scandal!, Wild at Heart, Isidingo, Backstage and Kota Life Crisis. Apart from television, he starred in few number of films including: Blood and Oil, Mary and Martha, Iron Will, Finding Lenny and Journey is the Destination. He is also a prolific writer, who wrote the several 'Lokshin Bioskop' productions Uyaphapha, Reflections, Check-Coast, 4 Hours, Kasi Superhero and Naledi. In 2017, he played the popular role 'Detective Dlamini' in the television serial Bedford Wives.

In August 2020, he directed the comedy film Seriously Single with his sister Rethabile. It was released on July 31, 2020 on Netflix.

== Filmography ==
Year	Film	Role	Genre	Ref.
2005	Blow	Newspaper Seller	Short film	
2005	Backstage	Neo	TV series	
2005	A Warm Heart	Tembo	Short film	
2010	Blood and Oil	John Nanawe	TV movie	
2010	Intersexions	Thami	TV series	
2012	Wild at Heart	Sizwe	TV series	
2013	Mary and Martha	South African Doctor	TV movie	
2014	Kota Life Crisis	Executive producer	TV series	
2014	Check Coast	Writer	TV series	
2015	My Perfect Family	Executive producer	TV series	
2017	Thulani No Thuli	Executive producer	TV series	
2017	Bedford Wives	Detective Dlamini, executive producer	TV series	
2020	Seriously Single	Director, executive producer	Film	
