= Banele Ndaba =

South African influencer (born 2002)

- Born: Banele Ndaba; 24 December 2002 (age 23); Standerton, South Africa
- Other name: Moghelingz
- Occupations: Influencer; actor; comedian
- Years active: 2020–present

Banele Ndaba (born 24 December 2002) known professionally as Moghelingz, is a South African social media influencer, actor and comedian. He is best known for comedic videos and fashion content on TikTok. He won the Content Creator of the Year at the 2022 Clout Africa Awards and honoured the 2026 Humanz Top 20 Awards.

== Early life ==
Ndaba was born and raised in Standerton, Mpumalanga, South Africa. He comes from a family of strong women and was raised by his mother and grandmother. He has said that growing up in a township environment influenced his comedy content and he has spoken publicly about experiencing bullying and harassment related to his sexual identity and being in the LGBTQ+ community.

== Career ==
Ndaba began creating content on social media in 2016. In 2020, during the COVID-19 lockdown, he started posting comedic videos on TikTok. His content included sketches based on childhood memories, school experiences and township life. He became known for portraying different characters, particularly through his "Moghelingz" persona. On 2 May 2022, he won the Content Creator of the Year award at the Clout Africa Awards, held virtually in Nigeria. In December, he made his television acting debut with a cameo appearance in the SABC1 television series Uzalo.

In 2023, Ndaba was featured as one of the cover stars for the collaborative "AchievaTM Issue" of The Sowetan S-Mag in partnership with Standard Bank. He appeared in the Netflix comedy series Republic of South Ah Sh**t as Parafina. During the same year, he hosted behind-the-scenes coverage of the Metro FM Awards on TikTok and launched a YouTube podcast titled Bedroom Chats. Ndaba continued creating digital content and expanded his involvement in entertainment events with more than 2.4 million followers on TikTok.

In July 2024, Ndaba performed with Kamo Mphela at Afro Nation in Portugal and was included in the inaugural TikTok's Visionary Voices list by the Visionary Voices Africa in August. In November, he attended the Wicked premiere in London where he interacted with Ariana Grande and Cynthia Erivo. He co-hosted the TikTok Awards Sub-Saharan Africa 2024 alongside media personality Pamela Mtanga, held in Johannesburg. He received two nominations at the South African Social Media Awards for Social Media Personality of the Year and Social Media Dominance of the Year, and subsequently nominated at the Content Creator Awards for Trendsetter Award.

In February 2026, Ndaba was honoured at the inaugural Humanz Top 20 Awards for Top 20 Creators. On 2 March, he attended the world premiere of Peaky Blinders: The Immortal Man in Birmingham, United Kingdom. He was featured in the print July 2026 issue of GQ South Africa. In October, he was nominated for the Best Styled Individual of the Year at the 18th Feather Awards.

== Personal life ==
Ndaba identifies as a gay queer and has publicly embraced his identity as a queer body. As an openly gay, he told The Sowetan during an interview that:

I was raised by my mother and grandmother... I wouldn’t say being around women made me a gay person – I also won’t blame my father’s absence for my sexuality. Being gay is who I am and I knew from a very young age. Fortunately, I do get some love and support from the LGBTQI+ community.

In early 2026, he later stepped back from the drag-style wigs and outfits of "Moghelingz" persona to explore his masculine side. He has explicitly noted that trading "wigs for fades" was not a complete reinvention or an abandonment of his underlying sexuality, but simply showing another side of who he has always been.

== Filmography ==
=== Film ===
Year	Title	Role	Notes
2023	Republic of South Ah Sh**t	Parafina	Main role
2026	Seriously Single Too	Bowling Alley Employee	Recurring role

=== Television ===
Year	Title	Role	Notes
2022–2023	Birth of Stars	Himself	Supporting role
2022	Uzalo	Himself	Recurring role, 4 episodes
2024	Awkward Dates	Himself	Episode 37
2025	Muvhango	Himself	Recurring role

== Awards and nominations ==
Year	Award	Category	Nominated works	Result	Ref.
2022	Clout African Awards	Content Creator of the Year	Himself	Won	
2024	Visionary Voices Africa	TikTok's Visionary Voices	Himself	Honoured	
2024	South African Social Media Awards	Social Media Personality of the Year	Himself	Nominated	
2024	South African Social Media Awards	Social Media Dominance of the Year	Himself	Nominated	
2024	Content Creator Awards	Trendsetter Award	Himself	Nominated	
2026	Humanz Top 20 Awards	Top 20 Creators	Himself	Honoured	
2026	Feather Awards	Best Styled Individual of the Year	Himself	Nominated	
