= Coachella Randy =

South African influencer (born 2003)

- Born: Oratile Masedi Mashego; 7 October 2003 (age 23); Mamelodi, South Africa
- Occupations: Influencer; comedian; television personality
- Years active: 2020–present
- Mother: Vinolia Mashego

Oratile Masedi Mashego (born 7 October 2003) known professionally as Coachella Randy, is a South African media personality, comedian and television personality. He is best known as a starring cast on the YouTube famous reality show Birth of Stars.

== Early life ==
Masedi was born in 2003, in Mamelodi, Pretoria, South Africa. He grew up in a household that was involved in South African entertainment history and he is the son of the iconic Jam Alley host Vinolia Mashego and the grandson of producer Collins Mashego. He adopted the nickname "Randy" from his grandfather at a young age and later added "Coachella" as a tribute to Beyoncé's 2018 performance. He used his family's legacy to build his own career as a digital creator after his mother's passing in 2020.

== Career ==
Masedi began his career in 2020 as a social media content creator where he gained recognition for his comedic skits, fashion and lifestyle content. He won his first award at the 2021 Feather Awards for Social Media Personality of the Year. His online presence led to his casting in the YouTube reality series Birth of Stars alongside Kamohelo Pule and Kagiso Mogola in 2022, which focused on queer identity and storytelling. The show boosted his profile and established him into a notable digital creator. In 2024, he won the Trendsetter Award at the DStv Content Creator Awards. He collaborated Coca-Cola South Africa, where he was featured as part of the 2024 Coke Studio influencer squad to promote the brand’s campaign.

In January 2025, Masedi, Mogola and Pule separated and continued with separate careers. The same year, he won the Social Media Personality of the Year award at the South African Social Media Awards and dedicated the award to his late mother and his supporters. In October 2026, he collaborated with Dove and featured in GLAMOUR South Africa October 2026 Hair & Beauty Issue cover along Thick Leeyonce, Pamela Manana, Lebo Lion, Cleo Destiny and Lerato Auctavia Letlojane. The following month, in November, he won the Social Media Personality of the Year at the 18th Feather Awards.

== Public image ==
Masedi is defined "bold fashion" and widely recognized as an openly LGBTQ digital personality. He is known for embracing a "gender fluid" style and using his platform to challenge norms while promoting "visibility and acceptance" for queer individuals. Through his content and appearance on Birth of Stars, he has positioned himself as a voice for LGBTQ youth often highlighting themes of "identity". His influence as both a trendsetter and advocate has been acknowledged within the digital space, including recognition at the Content Creator Awards, Feather Awards and South African Social Media Awards.

== Personal life ==
Masedi identify as a queer and gay, and uses he/him pronouns. He is the son of the late South African television presenter and actress, Vinolia "V-Mash" Mashego.

== Filmography ==
Year	Title	Role	Notes
2022–2023	Birth of Stars	Himself	Main role
2022	Skeem Saam	Himself	Recurring role
2024	Awkward Dates	Himself	Episode 71

== Awards and nominations ==
Award	Year	Category	Nominated works	Result	Ref.
Feather Awards	2021	Social Media Personality of the Year	Himself	Won	
Feather Awards	2022	Socialite of the Year	Birth of Stars	Nominated	
Feather Awards	2022	Social Media Personality of the Year	Birth of Stars	Won	
Feather Awards	2026	Social Media Personality of the Year	Himself	Won	
Content Creator Awards	2024	Storyteller of the Year	Birth of Stars	Nominated	
Content Creator Awards	2024	Trendsetter Award	Himself	Won	
South African Social Media Awards	2025	Social Media Personality of the Year	Himself	Won	
