= Dominic Zaca =

South African media personality and activist (born 1992)

- Born: Dominic Amandah Zaca; 2 December 1992 (age 33); KwaZulu-Natal, South Africa
- Occupations: Media personality; activist; actror
- Years active: 2023–present
- Height: 1.64 m (5 ft 5 in)

Dominic Amandah Zaca (born 2 December 1992) is a South African media personality, LGBTQ activist, and actor. They are best known for being starred in Moja Love reality show The Way Ngingakhona (2023). They are using the TikTok platform to discuss issues affecting queer youth and address homophobia. They won Social Media Personality of the Year at the 17th annual Feather Awards in 2025.

== Career ==
Zaca has a huge following on social media, where they publish content related to fashion, beauty, LGBTQ rights and cyberbully. They made their television debut in the Moja Love reality series The Way Ngingakhona (The Way That I Am) in 2023. The following year in 2024, they appeared in an episode of the Showmax original legal drama series Law, Love & Betrayal as Thuso. She received their first nominations from the South African Social Media Awards for Dominance of the Year.

In 2025, Zaca became involved in a dispute with television personality Lasizwe over their appearance on Awkward Dates. They alleged that their agreement had been breached when the episode originally released online and was broadcast on Mzansi Magic, and also raised concerns about payment. Lasizwe denied owing Zaca money as the dispute occurred wider disagreements surrounding the programme's broadcast deal with MultiChoice and its subsequent removal from DStv. In late 2025, they won Social Media Personality of the Year at the 17th Feather Awards.

In 2026, they attended the Hollywoodbets Durban July as a guest of the Chinese vehicle brand Omoda. In October, they received the 18th Feather Awards nomination for Hot Chick of the Year.

== Personal life ==
Zaca identifies as a non-binary and uses they/them pronouns.

== Activism ==
Zaca has used social media to discuss LGBTQ–related issues, homophobia and cyberbullying. In 2023, they spoke publicly about experiencing homophobic abuse online and described an incident in which they reported a person who had directed a homophobic slur at them to the person's employer.

In 2024, Zaca became involved in a public dispute with actor Phila Madlingozi concerning cyberbullying and homophobic comments. Madlingozi accused them for being a fake activist and baiting homophobic people to make them being fired from their jobs. The same year, they was involved in a cyberbullying dispute with TikTok creator Nobangela Lokishi, who posted derogatory and homophobic comments about them online. The dispute received coverage from South African media, with Lokishi later removing the content and issuing an apology. In 2026, Lokishi claimed that the incident had affected his education and resulted in legal consequences.

In October 2025, Zaca attended an LGBTQIA+ Pride march wearing Zulu traditional attire. They shared a video from the event on social media, where the outfit prompted discussion about the relationship between Zulu cultural identity and LGBTQI+ identity. The appearance followed comments by radio personality Ngizwe Mchunu concerning gay men wearing Zulu traditional attire. The South African Human Rights Commission (SAHRC) ruled that Mchunu must remove the comments, issue a public apology and refrain from making similar discriminatory statements in the future.

== Filmography ==
Year	Title	Role	Notes
2023	The Way Ngingakhona	Herself	Reality show
2024	Law, Love & Betrayal	Thuso	Supporting role, season 1
2024	Udumo	Thoko	Supporting role

== Awards and nominations ==
Year	Award	Category	Nominated works	Result	Ref.
2024	South African Social Media Awards	Dominance of the Year	Themselves	Nominated	
2025	Feather Awards	Social Media Personality of the Year	Themselves	Won	
2026	Feather Awards	Hot Chick of the Year	Themselves	Nominated	
