= Kagiso Mogola =

South African influencer (born 2002)

- Born: 27 August 2002 (age 24); Soshanguve, South Africa
- Occupations: Influencer; DJ; media personality
- Years active: 2020–present

Kagiso Mogola (born 27 August 2002) is a South African influencer, DJ and media personality. He is best known as lead cast in YouTube reality television show Birth of Stars (2022–2023) and co-hosts Rhythm and VibesSA podcast.

== Early life ==
Mogola was born and grew up in Soshanguve, Pretoria, South Africa. During his childhood, he participated in athletics, sang in his school choir and was involved in his church's worship team. After completing high school, he enrolled at the University of Johannesburg to study law but later discontinued his studies after deciding that the course did not suit his interests.

== Career ==
Mogola began creating content on social media during the COVID-19 lockdown period in 2020. His online presence led to his casting in the YouTube reality series Birth of Stars alongside Kamohelo Pule and Coachella Randy in August 2022. In October, he attended the South African Fashion Week opening party hosted by Cruz Vodka at Ferguson's 5th Floor in Sandton. In 2023, he pursued a career as a DJ and dancer. He attended a DJ workshop with Lebza the Villain and studied at Boston Media House. He also worked as a club host and focused on New Age Bacardi music.

In 2024, Mogola attended the South African Fashion Week launch party, where he participated in the event's Studio 54 themed dress code. In January 2025, Mogola, Randy and Pule separated and continued with separate careers. In August 2025, he co-founded and became co-host of the podcast Rhythm & VibesSA with Hlomani Nketani. In October, he performed as DJ MaBoys at Johannesburg Pride, held under the theme "Purely, Queerly, African". He DJed while cycling through the parade. On 6 November 2026, he won the Best Styled Individual award at the 18th Feather Awards.

== Personal life ==
Mogola identifies as gay and queer. He realised he was gay in Grade 9 when he 15 years and came out to his family and friends in Grade 10.

== Filmography ==
| Year | Title | Role | Notes |
|---|---|---|---|
| 2022–2023 | Birth of Stars | Himself | Main role |
| 2022 | Skeem Saam | Himself | Recurring role |
| 2026 | Awkward Dates | Himself | Episode 104 |

== Awards and nominations ==
| Award | Year | Category | Nominated works | Result | Ref |
|---|---|---|---|---|---|
| Feather Awards | 2022 | Socialite of the Year | Birth of Stars | Nominated | |
| Feather Awards | 2022 | Social Media Personality of the Year | Birth of Stars | Won | |
| Feather Awards | 2025 | Best Styled Individual of the Year | Himself | Nominated | |
| Feather Awards | 2026 | Best Styled Individual of the Year | Himself | Won | |
| Content Creator Awards | 2024 | Storyteller of the Year | Birth of Stars | Nominated | |
