= Kamohelo Pule =

South African influencer and singer (born 2002)

Kamo WW
- Born: Kamohelo Thabiso Pule; June 6, 2002 (age 24); Pretoria, South Africa
- Occupations: Influencer; singer; actor
- Years active: 2021–present
- Height: 1.87 m (6 ft 2 in)
- Musical career
- Genres: Amapiano; gqom; electronic
- Instruments: Vocals
- Labels: Universal Music Group; Virgin Active Records

Kamohelo Thabiso Pule (born 6 June 2002), professionally known as Kamo WW, is a South African media personality, singer, television personality and actor. He is best known for his starring role on the YouTube original reality show Birth of Stars. He made his first debut single "Abafana" in 2023 and became the first openly queer amapiano artist.

== Early life ==
Pule was born on 6 June 2002, in Pretoria, Gauteng, South Africa and grew up in Springs, South Africa in the East Rand. He states that he knew from a young age which career path he intended to follow.

== Career ==
Pule's breakout role was in the YouTube original reality show Birth of Stars in August 2022, in which he starred alongside his friends Coachella Randy and Kagiso Mogola for two seasons. He has collaborated with several notable beauty and fashion brands including Adidas, Converse, Pantene, Dolce & Gabbana, Maybelline, H&M and RICH MNISI. Pule's music is part of the amapiano, electronic and gqom genres. He release his debut single "Abafana" featuring Xduppy and more in 2023. The same year, he released his second single "Chommie" featuring Chley. In 2024, he released his debut EP Pose with two singles; "Shake (A)" and "YihYih (Thiba)".

In January 2025, Pule, Randy and Mogola separated and continued with separate careers. By 2025, he had become one of the best of Amapiano artist in South Africa releasing hit single "23 (Chipi)". In October, he played the main role as Lelz in Netflix crime series Bad Influencer. In February 2026, he has announced that he is officially making a career as a professional DJ.

== Personal life ==
Pule proudly identify as queer gay and came out to his family when he was a teenager.

== Filmography ==
=== Television ===
| Year | Title | Role | Notes |
|---|---|---|---|
| 2022–2023 | Birth of Stars | Himself | Main role |
| 2022 | Skeem Saam | Himself | Recurring role |
| 2022 | Instapreneur | Himself | Guest |
| 2025 | Bad Influencer | Lelz | Main role |

== Awards and nominations ==
| Year | Association | Category | Nominated works | Result | Ref. |
|---|---|---|---|---|---|
| 2022 | Feather Awards | Socialite of the Year | Birth of Stars | Nominated | |
| 2022 | Feather Awards | Social Media Personality of the Year | Birth of Stars | Won | |
| 2024 | Content Creator Awards | Storyteller of the Year | Birth of Stars | Nominated | |
| 2024 | South African Social Media Awards | Beauty Influencer of the Year | Himself | Nominated | |
