= Birth of Stars =

South African reality television series

- Genre: Reality television
- Created by: Orapeleng Modutle
- Starring: Kamohelo Pule; Coachella Randy; Kagiso Mogola
- Country of origin: South Africa
- Original language: English
- No. of seasons: 2
- No. of episodes: 8

Production
- Executive producer: Orapeleng Modutle
- Production location: Johannesburg
- Running time: 25 min
- Production company: OM Communications

Original release
- Network: YouTube
- Release: 8 July 2022 – 22 September 2023

Birth of Stars is a South African YouTube reality show produced by Orapeleng Modutle that follows three young creatives and influencers Kamohelo Pule, Coachella Randy and Kagiso Mogola as they navigate identity and creativity in the public eye. It was launched in 2022.

The show is aimed at uplifting and giving visibility to queer voices in South Africa, offering representation and challenging stereotypes about LGBTQ people.

== Background ==
Birth of Stars is a South African YouTube reality series created during a time when social media was becoming a major platform for young creators. The show was developed to give visibility to the lives of young queer creatives and their everyday experiences. It features Kamohelo Pule, Coachella Randy and Kagiso Mogola, who were already popular on social media before starting the series. The creators wanted to show real life stories about friendship, ambition and personal growth. The series was launched on YouTube instead of traditional television to reach a wider, younger audience. The simple and unscripted style of the show reflects the aim of showing authentic and relatable content.

== Cast ==
=== Main cast ===
- Kamohelo Pule
- Coachella Randy
- Kagiso Mogola

=== Supporting cast ===
- Orapeleng Modutle
- Lasizwe
- Banele Ndaba
- Hlomani Nketani

== Reception ==
The show has been described as part of a ''new wave'' of content, a movement in which social media and streaming platforms offer space for fresh voices and underrepresented communities. The group (and show) gained massive social media traction quickly by posting, dancing, nightlife content and fashion helped them stand out and reportedly their first episode had over 500 000 views and 70 000 subscribers.

=== Awards and nominations ===
Year	Association	Category	Nominated works	Result	Ref.
2022	Feather Awards	Socialite of the Year	Birth of Stars	Nominated	
2022	Feather Awards	Social Media Personality of the Year	Birth of Stars	Won	
2024	Content Creator Awards	Storyteller of the Year	Birth of Stars	Nominated	
