= Awkward Dates =

- Genre: Dating show
- Created by: Lasizwe
- Presented by: Lasizwe Dambuza
- Country of origin: South Africa
- Original language: English
- No. of episodes: 113

Production
- Production company: TD Media

Original release
- Network: Mzansi Magic; YouTube
- Release: 4 August 2023 – present

Awkward Dates is a South African YouTube dating show created and hosted by Lasizwe, and produced by his production company TD Media. The show follows Lasizwe going on blind dates with various celebrities.

The first YouTube video was posted in August 2023, and as of August 2026, 110 episodes have been released.

The show has been nominated at the 2024 South African Film and Television Awards, in the Best Online Content category.

On 12 April 2025, the show premiered on Mzansi Magic following its online success.

In June 2025, the show was removed from DSTV by MultiChoice. The decision reportedly followed the claim that most guests demanded to be paid. The guests claimed to have agreed only to appear on YouTube and not mainstream TV. This situation forced Lasizwe and Multichoice to terminate their contract.

In August 2025, the show returned to television on Mzansi Magic after Lasizwe had initially terminated the contract with DSTV.

In October 2026, the show was nominated for Best online series at the 4th Annual Content Creator Awards.

== Background ==
Awkward Dates involves Lasizwe meeting celebrity guests at local restaurants for a date, where they engage in casual, awkward, and sometimes hilarious conversations.

The first season of Awkward Dates showed viewers all the awkwardness that happens on first dates. This included not being able to use some utensils correctly, as well as some uncomfortable small talk. Lasizwe's sister Khanyi Mbau, brother Lungile, friend Mihlali Ndamase, including musicians Kamo Mphela, Toss and politician Mmusi Maimane, were the first celebrities featured on season 1.

== List of episodes ==
No.	Date of Episode	Guest	Ref.
1	4 August 2023	Mmusi Maimane	
2	11 August 2023	Toss	
3	18 August 2023	Kamo Mphela	
4	25 August 2023	Mihlali Ndamase	
5	1 September 2023	Lungile (Lasizwe's brother)	
6	8 September 2023	Khanyi Mbau	
7	15 September 2023	Kwenzo Ngcobo	
8	22 September 2023	Ntando Duma	
9	29 September 2023	Seemah	
10	6 October 2023	Minnie Dlamini	
11	13 October 2023	Cyan Boujee	
12	22 October 2023	Faith Nketsi	
13	29 October 2023	Vusi Nova	
14	5 November 2023	Londie London	
15	12 November 2023	Bontle Modiselle	
16	19 November 2023	Dawn Thandeka King	
17	26 November 2023	DJ Sbu	
18	3 December 2023	Anele Zondo	
19	7 December 2023	Nadia Nakai	
20	2 February 2024	Its Thandooo	
21	9 February 2024	Clement Maosa	
22	16 February 2024	Zola Nombona	
23	23 February 2024	Primo (Primo9teen) Baloyi	
24	1 March 2024	Unathi Nkayi	
25	8 March 2024	Libho Geza	
26	15 March 2024	Rami Chuene	
27	22 March 2024	Maps Maponyane	
28	28 March 2024	Just Daddy G (Gontse)	
29	4 April 2024	Junior De Rocka	
30	11 April 2024	Sandile Mahlangu	
31	18 April 2024	Thando Thabethe	
32	25 April 2024	Zillewizzy	
33	9 May 2024	Tshepo Koke	
34	16 May 2024	Yanda Woods	
35	23 May 2024	Manaka Ranaka	
36	30 May 2024	Ghost Hlubi	
37	4 June 2024	Banele Ndaba	
38	6 June 2024	Jesse Suntele	
39	11 June 2024	Mologadi (Titus) & Lungile	
40	13 June 2024	JosephDary	
41	18 June 2024	Dominic Zaca & Lungile	
42	20 June 2024	The Funny Chef	
43	25 June 2024	Khaya Dlala & Lungile	
44	27 June 2024	BU (Luthando)	
45	2 July 2024	Ntokozo Mahlinza & Lungile	
46	4 July 2024	Linda Mtoba	
47	9 July 2024	Nomsa Buthelezi & Lungile	
48	19 July 2024	Sean (Rockets Owner)	
49	23 July 2024	Pearl Thusi & Lungile	
50	11 August 2024	Elaine	
51	18 August 2024	Zee Nxumalo	
52	20 August 2024	Mpho Popps	
53	27 August 2024	Liema Pantsi	
54	3 September 2024	Khosi Thwala	
55	10 September 2024	DBN Gogo	
56	17 September 2024	Christall Kay	
57	19 September 2024	Zintle Mofokeng & Ntokozo Mahlinza	
58	24 September 2024	Sphokuhle N	
59	27 September 2024	Siyamthanda	
60	2 October 2024	Mapaseka Koetle	
61	4 October 2024	Nobantu Vilakazi & Ntokozo Mahlinza	
62	9 October 2024	Tsitsi Chiumy	
63	11 October 2024	Letroy Mashigo	
64	16 October 2024	Nonku Williams	
65	21 October 2024	Kagiso Magola & Lungile	
66	24 October 2024	Seekay	
67	6 November 2024	Boity	
68	19 November 2024	Mduduzi Mabaso	
69	21 November 2024	Gugu Mandela	
70	26 November 2024	Celeste Ntuli	
71	27 November 2024	Coachella Randy	
72	5 December 2024	Julius Malema	
73	17 December 2024	Kwesta	
74	31 December 2024	Andile	
75	16 January 2025	Kenneth Nkosi	
76	21 January 2025	Khanyisa	
77	27 January 2025	Paballo	
78	5 February 2025	Priddy Ugly	
79	11 February 2025	Minenhle Sithole	
80	19 February 2025	Wian	
81	23 February 2025	Zuki Lamani	
82	28 February 2025	Anele Mdoda	
83	22 May 2025	Zozibini Tunzi	
84	29 May 2025	Sol Phenduka	
85	5 June 2025	Asavela	
86	14 June 2025	Simon Kaggwa Njala	
87	19 June 2025	Nkosazana Daughter	
88	27 June 2025	Brain Jotter	
89	3 July 2025	Zakes Bantwini	
90	10 July 2025	JoJo Robinson	
91	20 July 2025	LaConco	
92	1 August 2025	Tumi Seeco	
93	14 August 2025	Lady Du	
94	24 November 2025	Hope Mbhele	
95	16 December 2025	DJ Speedsta	
96	25 January 2026	Tumi Morake	
97	29 January 2026	Yanda Woods & Zillewizzy	
98	5 February 2026	Bontle Modiselle & Priddy Ugly	
99	12 February 2026	Lungile & Mom	
100	12 February 2026	Lungile & Mom	
101	19 February 2026	Kamo Mphela	
102	26 February 2026	Nandi Madida	
103	5 March 2026	The Dambuza’s (Anika Dambuza & Sihile Dambuza)	
104	14 May 2026	Kagiso Mogola & Hlomani Nketani	
105	25 June 2026	Mpho Popps, Farieda & Tsitsi	
106	12 July 2026	Gogo & Mo	
107	26 July 2026	Jonasi's Kids from Netflix's The Polygamist	
108	30 July 2026	Vuyo Biyela	
109	6 August 2026	Kwanele Mthethwa	
110	20 August 2026	Buntu Petse & Londa	
111	27 August 2026	Nota Baloyi	
112	1 October 2026	Nadia Nakai	
113	8 October 2026	Toss	

== Accolades ==
Year	Award	Category	Nominee(s)	Result	Ref.
2024	South African Film and Television Awards	Best online content	Awkward Dates	Nominated	
2026	Content Creator Awards	Best online series	Awkward Dates	Nominated	
