= Law, Love & Betrayal =

South African drama television series

- Genre: Telenovela
- Created by: Thandi Ramathesele
- Written by: Lwazi Mvusi; Chisanga Kabinga; Frances Maposa; Oratile Mogoje; Alex Xolo
- Directed by: Nthabiseng Tau; Nthabiseng Mokoena; Christo Davids
- Starring: Pearl Modiadie; Nimrod Nkosi; Nhlanhla Kunene; Dineo Rasedile; Anelisa Phewa; Katlego Lebogang; Sparky Xulu
- Country of origin: South Africa
- Original languages: English; Zulu
- No. of seasons: 2
- No. of episodes: 26

Production
- Executive producer: Thandi Ramathesele
- Producer: Izwi Multimedia
- Camera setup: Multi-camera
- Running time: 50–54 minutes

Original release
- Network: Showmax; Mzansi Magic
- Release: 5 September 2024 – 31 May 2026

Law, Love & Betrayal is a South African legal drama produced by Thandi Ramathesele aired in Showmax and Mzansi Magic. The series follows Gugu Mabaso, a tough township lawyer, as she forces her way into a slick family owned firm in Sandton.

== Premise ==
The story centers on Gugu Mabaso, an ambitious attorney who secures a position at the elite Gumede & Associates. Though she operates out of a Sandton boardroom, she never forgets her township roots. Gugu quickly realizes that the firm’s polished conceals the exact same dark secrets and hidden agendas she thought she left behind.

== Cast ==
=== Season 1 ===
==== Main cast ====
- Dineo Rasedile as Gugu Mabaso
- Pearl Modiadie as Ayanda Gumede Williams
- Nimrod Nkosi as Gatsha Gumede
- Anelisa Phewa as James Makaula
- Thuli Nduvane as Lwazi Koyana
- Kagiso Rathebe as Fez
- Siya Sepotokele as Thabo

==== Supporting cast ====
- KB Motsilanyane as Andile Gumede
- Don Mlangeni Nawa as Solomon
- Mavuso Simelane as Samukelo
- Lebohang Msiza as Musa
- Ivandro Manhice as Trevor
- David Mankge as Velaphi
- Nozipho Ndlovu as Gugu's Intern
- Bohang Moeko as Bandile
- Dominic Zaca as Thuso

=== Season 2 ===
- Pearl Modiadie as Ayanda Gumede
- Nimrod Nkosi as Gatsha Gumede
- Nhlanhla Kunene as Mondli Gumede
- Anelisa Phewa as James Makaula
- Shannon Esra as Sandra Stein
- Sparky Xulu as Sakhile Nxusa
- Katlego Lebogang as Bakang Mokgotso
- Siya Sepotokele as Thabo
- Thuli Nduvane as Lwazi Koyana
- Mavuso Simelane as Samukelo
- Bohang Moeko as Bandile
- Christo Davids as News Reporter
- Thokozani Nzima as Judge Mokgotso
- Zimkhitha Nyoka as Buhle
