= Bad Influencer (TV series) =

South African drama television series

- Genre: Crime drama
- Created by: Kudi Maradzika
- Written by: Kudi Maradzika; Sydney Dire; Daniel Zimbler (Head Writer)
- Directed by: Keitumetse Qhali; Ari Kruger
- Starring: Jo-Anne Reyneke; Cindy Mahlangu; Thapelo Mokoena; Zozibini Tunzi; Hamilton Dhlamini; Aubrey Poo; Masasa Mbangeni; Zikhona Sodlaka; Kamohelo Pule; Tina Jaxa; Brendon Daniels; Masasa Mbangeni; Emmanuel Castis; Julia Anastasopoulos; Lerato Nxumalo; Nathaniel Ramabulana; Vincent Mahlape Sekuba
- Country of origin: South Africa
- No. of seasons: 1
- No. of episodes: 7

Production
- Executive producers: Kudi Maradzika; Nosipho Ngoasheng Dumisa; Bradley Joshua; Benjamin Overmeyer; Simon Beesley; Travis Taute; Daryne Joshua
- Producers: Gambit Films, Lincoln Green Media
- Camera setup: Multi-camera
- Running time: 45–50 minutes

Original release
- Network: Netflix
- Release: 31 October 2025

Bad Influencer is a South African drama television series produced for the streaming service Netflix created by Kudi Maradzika that premiered on from 31 October 2025. It details the high stakes collision of social media glamour and the criminal underground in Johannesburg.

== Premise ==
Set in Johannesburg, Bad Influencer follows BK played by Jo-Anne Reyneke, a struggling fashion designer and single mother who joins forces with Pinky played by Cindy Mahlangu a social media influencer to run a counterfeit luxury handbag business.

== Cast ==
=== Main cast ===
- Jo-Anne Reyneke as BK
- Cindy Mahlangu as Pinky
- Thapelo Mokoena as Themba
- Zozibini Tunzi as Naomi
- Hamilton Dhlamini as Jobs "Flames" Jiyane
- Tina Jaxa as Doreen
- Aubrey Poo as Mandla
- Kamohelo Pule as Lelz
- Zikhona Sodlaka as Thandz
- Emmanuel Castis as Babi Barlos
- Masasa Mbangeni as Gorata
- Brendon Daniels as Brigadier Booysens
- Julia Anastasopoulos as Dunia Barlos
- Lerato Nxumalo as Barbie
- Modise Motaung as Bheki
- Vincent Mahlape Sekuba as Bra Alex
- Mandisa Nduma as Joyce
- Nathaniel Ramabulana as Dingane

=== Supporting cast ===
- Zenokuhle Maseko as Thulz
- Kudi Maradzika as French Executive
- Akhenime Mfenyana as Lindiwe
- Mich Mazibuko as Moose
- Emmanuel Mkhatshwa as Felix
- Sthandile Nkosi as Young Doreen
- Tshego Koke as Gym Jock #1
- Tadeus Mbatha as Gym Jock #2
- Olwethu Mackay as Lower influencer
- Mpilo Shabalala as Leo

=== Recurring cast ===
- Liema Pantsi
- Sarah Langa
- Mihlali Ndamase
- Blue Mbombo
- Yolanda Monyai
- Pumla Dineo
- Mohale Motaung

== Production ==
Bad Influencer was created by Zimbabwean born filmmaker Kudi Maradzika, and produced by South Africa’s Gambit Films and developed by Lincoln Green Media for Netflix. The series, which consists of 1 season with 7 episodes was filmed primarily in Johannesburg and is set against the local influencer culture, crime and fashion counterfeiting scene. Bad Influencer's creator Kudi Maradzika revealed in a Coffee Chat interview that she used to be an influencer, "and when the Realness Episodic Lab call came out, the idea of BK, a woman trying to fit into this world of influencers while hiding a criminal life, came to mind"

Executive producers include Kudi Maradzika, Nosipho Ngoasheng Dumisa, Bradley Joshua, Benjamin Overmeyer, Simon Beesley, Travis Taute and Daryne Joshua. Daniel Zimbler serves as Co-Executive Producer. The show was produced using a Multi-camera setup and blends crime drama with commentary on social media influence, luxury branding and digital deception.

== Release ==
The series premiered on Netflix on 31 October 2025.

== Reception ==
The show has had generally positive responses although its as yet unrated on Rotten Tomatoes. Jo-Anne Reyneke has received praise for her portrayal of BK, a single parent doing all that she can to take care of her special needs child.
