= Cyan Boujee =

South Africa media personality (born 2001)

- Born: Honour Zuma; 25 August 2001 (age 25); Johannesburg, Gauteng, South Africa
- Other name: Sesi Cyan
- Occupations: Influencer; DJ; dancer
- Years active: 2021–present
- Musical career
- Genre: Amapiano
- Instruments: Piano

Honour Zuma (born 25 August 2001) known professionally as Cyan Boujee, is a South African influencer, DJ and dancer. She is best known for her viral videos on YouTube and TikTok. She was the ambassador of the Fashion Nova curve clothing brand. She was involved in the Alabuga Start programme that targeted young South African women aged 18 to 22 in 2025.

== Career ==
Zuma began building a social media presence through lifestyle, beauty and fashion–related content. She has worked with Fashion Nova Curve clothing brand as a brand ambassador and has shared skincare routines, food recipes and vlog–style videos on her social media platforms. She refers to some of her recipe content as "boujee bowls". In 2023, she went viral, after Prince Kaybee linked her sex tape and she stated that the video was shot when she was 19. The same year she joined the "ceiling trend", a social media viral trend and suddenly break the internet with millions of views. In 2024, Zuma became one of the most googled people on the internet from South Africa where she was listed the second person. She is a full time club and events Disc jockey.

In 2025, Zuma faced controversy after travelling to Russia to promote the Alabuga Start programme. The programme later came over allegations of misleading recruitment and human trafficking which South African Department of International Relations and Cooperation (DIRCO) warned them. She later deleted her promotional content and said she had not fully researched the programme before participating. She made a viral dance challenge titled "Tobetsa 3.0", making it her official signature dance. In November, she performance at Grace Mondlana Year End Party event hosted by Grace Mondlana, which went viral on social media platforms.

== Personal life ==
=== Relationships ===
In 2022, Zuma was dating a Nigerian musician Bamzy Riches and opened a case against him for assaulting her. In May, she faked a pregnancy to blackmail Kagiso Lerutla and later issued a statement denying of attempting to fake any pregnancy:

"Me and my baby daddy (Bamzy riches) did have a baby planned and we did get pregnant but unfortunately, we lost our baby earlier this year".

In 2023, a private sexual video involving Zuma and Prince Kaybee was leaked online. On Podcast and Chill with MacG, she stated the video was recorded when she was 19 at Kaybee’s request and alleged the leak was intentional after he did not respond to her messages. Kaybee publicly denied a personal connection with her at the time. In early 2026, online claimed Zuma was pregnanted by DJ Maphorisa and would take an 8 month break from gigs, but denied the claims stating she had no plans for pregnancy and was focusing on her career.

=== Legal issues ===
In June 2023, Zuma was arrested for stealing a phone. She was later released from the policy custody after allegedly stealing the phone, an iPhone 13.

In April 2026, a viral posts on X alleged that the Special Investigating Unit (SIU) had expanded its Ekurhuleni investigation to include the assets of Zuma, and other celebrities includes MaWhoo and Sithelo Shozi. The SIU described the claims as "fake news".

== Public image ==
=== Online controversies ===
==== Alabuga Start program ====
In August 2025, Zuma faced significant public backlash after uploading promotional content to her Instagram account for the Russian "Alabuga Start" program. The social media campaign targeted young South African women aged 18 to 22, enticing them with promises of free flights, housing and high paying jobs in Russia. The program quickly drew warnings from the South African Department of International Relations and Cooperation (DIRCO) and international law enforcement agencies like Interpol. Investigative reports revealed that the recruitment drive was a front for human trafficking and exploitative labor, alleging that the recruited young women were forced into manufacturing Geran-2 military drones for the Russian invasion of Ukraine under prison-like conditions.

Following the controversy, Zuma deleted the promotional videos and issued a public apology to her followers. She stated that she did not support "human trafficking" and characterized the incident as a major "learning curve". She later claimed she had noticed several personal "red flags" during the deal, asserting that she secretly left Russia without her hosts' knowledge after experiencing hospitality issues and professional misconduct. Her TikTok account with other social media influencers were permanently banned.

==== Fraud and corruption ====
In April 2026, Zuma attracted significant public attention after sharing visuals of a luxury property valued between R9.5 million and R10 million, located in Midstream Ridge Estate, Centurion. The high valuation of the property led to widespread public debate regarding the sources of her income, following the high profile arrest of Kagiso Lerutla, the City Manager of the City of Ekurhuleni Metropolitan Municipality, who faced criminal charges related to fraud, corruption and financial misconduct stemming from municipal forensic investigations. Her all bank accounts were frozen and she later deactivated her Instagram and TikTok account.

== Filmography ==
Year	Title	Role	Notes
2023	Awkward Dates	Herself	Episode 11
2025	Drink or Tell the Truth	Herself	Episode 22
