= Grace Mondlana =

South African influencer (born 2001)

- Born: Grace Mondlana; January 19, 2001 (age 25); Thembisa, Gauteng, South Africa
- Education: University of Pretoria
- Occupations: Influencer; content creator
- Years active: 2020–present

Grace Mondlana (born 19 January 2001) is a South African media personality and content creator. She is widely recognised for her lifestyle vlogs and won the Emerging Creator Award at the Content Creator Awards in 2024.

== Early life ==
Mondlana was born in 2001, Thembisa, Gauteng, South Africa and attended Queens High School in Johannesburg. She went to the University of Pretoria where she obtained Bachelor degree in Education in 2024.

== Career ==
Mondlana began creating content during the COVID-19 pandemic, when she was teaching on YouTube and videos include lifestyle vlogs, motivational content, wellness tips and relatable. She has collaborated with a variety of brands and secured notable partnerships include Coca-Cola, Stork, Cadbury, Neutrogena, Takealot, KFC and Stimorol. In 2024, she won the Emerging Creator Award at the DStv Content Creator Awards. She was featured in Sowetan SMag cover alongside other TikTokers to discuss how the platform has changed their live.

In 2025, Mondlana collaborated with Nivea internationally where she traveled to Germany and China. She was recognized as one of the Top 16 Youth-Owned Brands (YOBA) in South Africa. She became the first ever brand ambassador for GWM South Africa. Later the same year, in November, Mondlana hosted a widely publicised annual year end party attended by influencers and other celebrities. Fans were shocked of the drinks price menu as it was very expensive. These events contributed to ongoing media interest in her public life.

In February 2026, Mondlana was honoured at the inaugural Humanz Top 20 Awards for Top 20 Creators. In April, she was named the first female ambassador for Eden Perfumes. In August, she was the most nominated creator with Vafa Naraghi at the 4th Content Creator Awards for three nominations and won two award during the main event. In October, she received her first Feather Awards nomination for Social Media Personality of the Year. The same month, on 29 October, she made her first appearance in Top Billing.

=== Philanthropy ===
In September 2026, Mondlana announced she would donate five of her own matric dance gowns to five learners from five provinces. The package included makeup, hair and transport. She said she was inspired by her own 2019 matric dance, where she wore a Woolworths outfit. In October, she fulfilled the promise.

== Personal life ==
=== Relationships ===
Mondlana was previously in a relationship with Sipho Lazarus Zulu, who died in a car accident in June 2025. She publicly mourned his passing which substantial media attention and drama.

Mondlana has a dog named Kai. On 25 July 2026, she hosted first Kai's birthday party which went viral on internet.

=== Health ===
In late July 2026, Mondlana reported a medical emergency through social media vlogs. According to her updates, she experienced sudden nausea while descending a flight of stairs and collapsed. The fall resulted in a severely torn and sprained ankle ligament that required surgical realignment. She was hospitalized for eight nights. During her hospital stay, further diagnostic investigations were conducted, including an electroencephalography (EEG) to assess brain activity. These tests indicated an underlying neurological condition as the cause of the collapse.

== Controversies ==
=== Online controversies ===
Mondlana has had a public dispute with actress and content creator Lerato Nxumalo. The conflict began in 2024 after internet users compared their content and asked about a collaboration, to which Mondlana reportedly replied "Lol, no". Nxumalo later said Mondlana was "cosplaying as a nice girl" and was self-obsessed with comments about her. The feud resurfaced in July 2025 after Mondlana posted a tribute to her late ex-boyfriend. Nxumalo posted an Instagram story meme that read "the results are in you are a clout chaser," which was interpreted as shading Mondlana. Mondlana turned off comments on her TikTok videos following the backlash.

In October 2026, Mondlana accused fellow creator Advise Langa of copying her content. In a TikTok video viewed over 3.2 million times, she said Langa recreated her videos and copied her scripts word-for-word states "plagiarism", stating "To be inspired is one thing, but to copy and paste is another". She also said that while Langa had acknowledged his actions and apologised privately, he later joked about the situation on other platforms.

== Awards and nominations ==
Award	Year	Category	Nominated works	Result	Ref.
Content Creator Awards	2024	Emerging Creator	Herself	Won	
Content Creator Awards	2026	Content Creator of the Year	Herself	Won	
Content Creator Awards	2026	Trendsetter	Herself	Won	
Content Creator Awards	2026	Public Choice	Herself	Nominated	
Top 16 Youth-Owned Brands Awards	2025	Top Personalities & Influencers Brands	Herself	Won	
South African Social Media Awards	2025	Best Personality of the Year	Herself	Nominated	
Humanz Top 20 Awards	2026	Top 20 Creators	Herself	Honoured	
Feather Awards	2026	Social Media Personality of the Year	Herself	Nominated	
