= Drink or Tell the Truth =

- Genre: Game show
- Created by: Lasizwe
- Presented by: Lasizwe Dambuza
- Country of origin: South Africa
- Original language: English
- No. of episodes: 30

Production
- Production company: TD Media

Original release
- Network: YouTube
- Release: 23 July 2021 – present

Drink or Tell the Truth is a South African YouTube drinking game show created and hosted by Lasizwe. The celebrity and influencer driven game show puts trend setters in the hot seat, challenging them to answer bold, unfiltered questions or face the alternative, which is downing a shot of an unpleasant concoction.

The first YouTube video was posted in July 2021. After each episode of the first season of the YouTube series, the show trended on Twitter due to the confessions and gossips that were often said on the show.

== Background ==
Drink or Tell the truth is a spin on the popular "truth or dare" game. In the show Lasizwe asks celebrity guests tense, awkward burning questions on everyone's mind. The celebrities then either drink an awful concoction or tell the truth.

The show has featured local celebrities such as Boity, Nadia Nakai,Zodwa Wabantu and Major League DJz

Lasizwe speaking to City Press on what inspired the show:

It started with an American show called The Late Late Show With James Corden, who has a segment on it called Spill Your Guts. I wanted to do a South African version.

On 24 September 2023 in the season finale episode, Lasizwe announced that the show was coming to an end. The final episode featured Nadia Madida as the celebrity guest.

In March 2025, Lasizwe revealed the show was returning for a second season. The first episode aired on 23 March 2025.

== List of episodes ==
No.	Date of Episode	Guest	Ref.
1	23 July 2021	Ntando Duma	
2	30 July 2021	Major League DJz	
3	6 August 2021	Zodwa Wabantu	
4	13 August 2021	Tumi Secco & Junior Khoza	
5	20 August 2021	Mihlali Ndamase	
6	27 August 2021	Nadia Nakai	
7	3 September 2021	Norma Mngoma	
8	10 September 2021	Da L.E.S	
9	17 September 2021	Boity	
10	24 September 2021	Nandi Madida	
11	23 March 2025	Itss Thandooo	
12	30 March 2025	Zille Wizzy	
13	6 April 2025	Yanda Woods	
14	13 April 2025	Seemah	
15	20 April 2025	Sinaye	
16	27 April 2025	Zinhle Zee	
17	4 May 2025	Just Daddy G	
18	11 May 2025	Paballo M	
19	18 May 2025	Libho Geza	
20	25 May 2025	Panda & Itss Thando	
21	22 June 2025	Peachy Sprinkle	
22	29 June 2025	Cyan Boujee	
23	6 July 2025	Just Daddy Gee & Thakgi	
24	13 July 2025	Zee Nxumalo	
25	27 July 2025	Titus Mologadi	
26	7 August 2025	Munaka	
27	24 August 2025	Lebo Rampedi	
28	11 September 2025	Ashley Ogle	
29	23 September 2025	Paballo Noko	
30	30 September 2025	Sasha	

== Controversies ==
In October 2021, DJ Zinhle revealed she would not be appearing on the YouTube show. In an Instagram live between Lasizwe and DJ Zinhle, Lasizwe had proposed the DJ to appear on his show. However DJ Zinhle quickly denied the invitation.

In March 2025, it was rumoured that Lasizwe was romantically involved with Moshe Ndiki's ex-husband Phelo Bala. The speculation began when Mzimase "Mzi" Mtytide, who is Moshe's ex-boyfriend, went live on social media, sharing intimate details of their breakup and claiming Moshe had confided in him about his ex-husband staying at Lasizwe's house. However Lasizwe later addressed these speculations and denied them on the latest episode of the show.
