= Sphokuhle N =

South African influencer and entrepreneur (born 2001)

- Born: Sphokuhle Ntshalintshali; 29 July 2001 (age 25); Piet Retief, Mpumalanga, South Africa
- Education: Tshwane University of Technology
- Occupations: Influencer; entrepreneur
- Years active: 2019–present
- Height: 1.55 m (5 ft 1 in)

Sphokuhle Ntshalintshali (born 29 July 2001) known professionally as Sphokuhle N, is a South African social media personality and entrepreneur. She is best known her for her lip sync, dance and fashion videos on TikTok. She is the youngest brand ambassador for Chery South Africa's Tiggo Cross. She won the Global Champion Award at the Chery Global KOC (Key Opinion Consumer) Awards in China.

In 2025, she founded her own beauty brand namely Scrumptious Lips and named the Next Gen Game Changer by Glamour magazine.

== Early life ==
Ntshalintshali was born and raised in Piet Retief, Mpumalanga, South Africa and grew up in christian family and completed her matric in 2019 at Hoérskool Westonaria High School. In 2023, graduated from the Tshwane University of Technology where she later obtained a Diploma in Entrepreneurship Management.

== Career ==
Ntshalintshali began creating social media content in 2019 while she was still in high school. She rose to prominence through platforms such as TikTok, where she shares dance challenges, fashion, beauty, and lip sync videos. As of this period, she has amassed approximately 5 million followers and over 250 million likes across her social media platforms. She is signed with Spotlight Agency, which represents her in content creation and modelling. Throughout her career, she has collaborated with brands including Coca-Cola, Handy Andy, and Shein. In 2021, she was featured with Pd Jokes and Khanyisa Jaceni in a track "Sisonke" by Thozi that went viral with million of views on social media platforms and later nominated at the 28th South African Music Awards for TikTok Viral Song of the Year.

In 2022, Ntshalintshali made her television acting debut in the e.tv telenovela House of Zwide, portraying the character Yenzi. The same year, she received a nomination at the People's Choice Awards, where she ranked second among TikTok stars. In 2024, she was ranked 11th among the highest paid and most popular South African TikTok creators. She was appointed brand ambassador for Chery South Africa’s Tiggo Cross and subsequently received the Chery Global Key Opinion Consumers (KOCs) Award for Outstanding Performance Global Champion at an event held in China.

In 2025, Ntshalintshali was named the Next Gen Game Changer by the GLAMOUR Women of the Year Awards represented by the Glamour magazine. She was also announced as a brand ambassador and the face of Love and Darkly 2026 alongside Kealeboga Masango. In April 2026, she was featured on the Glamour Magazine cover as the lead with Wendy Gumede and Masango for GLAMOUR's African Month. In June, she collaborated with a clothing brand Mr Price for Mr Price x Sphokuhle collection.

=== Other ventures ===
==== Scrumptious Lips ====
In 2025, Sphokuhle founded her own beauty brand, Scrumptious Lips.

== Filmography ==
Year	Film	Role	Notes
2022	House of Zwide	Yenzi	Season 2, recurring role
2024	Awkward Dates	Herself	Episode 58

== Awards and nominations ==
Year	Award	Category	Nominated works	Result	Ref.
2022	South African Music Awards	TikTok Viral Song of the Year	"Sisonke" (Thozi feat. Pd Jokes and Khanyisa Jaceni)	Nominated	
2022	People's Choice Awards	African Social Star	Herself	Second	
2024	South African Social Media Awards	Emerging Social Media Personality of the Year	Herself	Nominated	
2024	Chery's Global KOCs	Global Champion Award	Herself	Won	
2025	African Golden Awards	Female TikToker of the Year	Herself	Nominated	
2025	GLAMOUR Women of the Year Awards	Next Gen Game Changer	Herself	Won	
