= Humanz Top 20 Awards =

The Humanz Top 20 Awards are South African awards presented by influencer marketing platform Humanz. The awards recognise social media influencers and digital content creators in South Africa. The programme features a list of 20 established creators and a separate list of 10 emerging creators.

== Background ==
The Humanz Top 20 Awards are South African awards established by the influencer marketing platform Humanz. The selection process combines data analysis from the Humanz platform with human review. The awards also include a category recognising emerging content creators, known as the Top 10 Up & Coming Creators.

== Humanz Top 20 Awards 2026 ==
=== Top 20 Creators ===
#	Name	Association
1	Amahle-Imvelo Jaxa	Politics
2	Banele Ndaba	Lifestyle & comedy
3	Bongani Baloyi	Film
4	Ervè Bukasa	Comedy
5	Farren Cloete	Faith
6	Grace Mondlana	Lifestyle & education
7	Dr Katlego Selikane	Health
8	Lasizwe	Comedy
9	Mbali Nhlapho	Cleaning
10	Nadia Jaftha	Lifestyle, beauty & comedy
11	Ndivhuwo Muhanelwa	Comedy
12	Onezwa Mbola	Food
13	Popi Sibiya	Travel & culture
14	Primo Baloyi	Comedy
15	Rasheeqah Karriem	Lifestyle & fashion
16	Robot Boii	Dance
17	Siyanda Bani	Fashion & lifestyle
18	Tadéus Mbatha	Film & comedy
19	Thandi Gama	Beauty
20	Thato Rampedi	Lifestyle

=== Top 10 Up & Coming Creators ===
#	Name	Association
1	Anarzade Omar	Beauty, lifestyle & food
2	Anika Dambuza	Lifestyle
3	Gloria Ngcobo	Fitness & dance
4	Hlomani Nketani	Lifestyle
5	Lerato Nkabinde	Comedy
6	Sinemivuyo Mpulu	Comedy & voiceover
7	Smangele Shabalala	Comedy
8	Tefelo Mathabe	Beauty & skincare
9	Thando Vokwana	Education
10	Zintle Mofokeng	Lifestyle & beauty
