= Nolo Phiri =

South african actress and businesswoman

- Born: Lehlogonolo Phiri; 4 February 1987 (age 39); Musina, South Africa
- Occupations: Actress; film director; producer
- Years active: 2017–present
- Notable work: Losing Lerato; Losing Lerato 2
- Television: Rhythm City

Nolo Phiri (born February 4, 1987) is a South African actress, television producer, businesswoman and director, best known for her role as Niki in the South African soap opera Rhythm City and Losing Lerato (2019).

== Early life and education ==
Nolo Phiri enrolled at the National School of the Arts before studying dramatic arts at the University of the Witwatersrand, where she earned an honours degree. She met filmmaker and producer Duma Ndlovu, whom she considered a mentor while studying at Wits.

== Career ==
=== Acting ===
Phiri gained recognition for her portrayal of Niki in Rhythm City. She has appeared in various other television shows and films. After leaving Rhythm City, Phiri starred in films including Kagiso Modupe's Losing Lerato (2019) and Home Wrecker (2023) which was a box office success.

=== Producing and Directing ===
Beyond acting, Nolo Phiri has also made contributions as a television producer and director. She has worked on several South African television projects.

== Business career ==
Nolo Phiri's fashion brand was released in 2016 in partnership with designers Apples and Oranges‚ in Johannesburg.

== Filmography ==
=== Film ===
Year	Title	Role	Notes
2019	Losing Lerato	Detective Nkala	
2023	Home Wrecker		
2024	Losing Lerato 2	Detective Nkala	

=== Television ===
Year	Title	Role	Notes
2007	Rhythm City	Niki	Main cast

=== Television ===
Year	Title	Director	Writer	Producer	Actor
2020	Umkhokha: The Curse	No	No	Yes	No
2024	016FM	No	No	Yes	No
