= Losing Lerato =

2019 South African film

- Directed by: Sanele Zulu
- Written by: Ricardo Arendse; Kagiso Modupe; Sanele Zulu
- Story by: Kagiso Modupe
- Produced by: Kagiso Modupe
- Starring: Kagiso Modupe; Patrick Mofokeng; Tshimollo Modupe; Samela Tyelbooi; Connie Chiume; Thato Molamu; Ayanda Borotho; Zandile Msutwana
- Cinematography: Gavin Sterley
- Edited by: Bongani Tshikawu
- Music by: Brian Temba
- Production companies: Bakwena Productions; Kagiso Modupe Film
- Distributed by: Netflix
- Release date: 13 September 2019
- Running time: 96 minutes
- Country: South Africa
- Languages: English; Zulu

Losing Lerato is a 2019 South African action drama film produced by Kagiso Modupe and Bakwena Productions. It was directed by Sanele zulu and written by Ricardo Arendse and Kagiso Modupe.The film stars Patrick Mofokeng, Connie Chiume, Ayanda Borotho, Tshimollo Modupe, Samela Tyelbooi and Kagiso Modupe.

The film was released on Netflix streaming platform on September 13, 2019.

== Synopsis ==
Thami is a struggling young man who has lost his job at a prestigious firm due to fraud accusations. This incident is the breaking point for his wife, Noluthando who is concerned about her future, leaves him, taking their daughter Lerato with her, and marries a local politician, Jake.

Thami is then faced with Noluthando's persistent efforts to block his access to Lerato. After exhausting all legal options and driven by his longing to reunite with his daughter, Thami decides to abduct Lerato from school. His attempt to spend a day with her quickly spirals into chaos, resulting in a tense standoff with the police and endangering not only their lives but also those of other passengers, leading to a dramatic hostage situation on the bus.

== Cast ==
- Kagiso Modupe as Thami
- Tshimillo Modupe as Lerato
- Samela Tyelbooi as Noluthando
- Nolo Phiri as Detective Nkala
- Thato Molamu as Jake
- Connie Chiume as Gogo on Bus
- Ayanda Borotho as Principal Modise
- Patrick Mofokeng as Station Commander
- Don Mlangeni as SWAT Commander
- Mandla Gaduka as Constable Xaba
- Zandile Msutwana as Teacher
- Mapaseka Koetle Nyokong as Bus Hostess
- Fezile Makhanya as Sniper
- Gabisile Tshabalala as Pregnant Passenger
- Mmarona Motshegoa as Little Kgomotso's Mother
- Thulani Msiza as Kgomotso's Father

== Production ==
Losing Lerato was produced by Bakwena Productions, with Principal photographytaking place in Johannesburg. Kagiso Modupe not only starred in the film but also served as one of its producers.

== Release ==
The film was released in South Africa on September 13, 2019. It received a positive reception from audiences and critics alike for its compelling story and strong performances, particularly from Kagiso Modupe and his real-life daughter Tshimillo Modupe.

== Box Office ==
Losing Lerato grossed over R4.1 million ($217,878) during its first five weeks of release, marking it a commercial success in the South African film market.

== Reception ==
Critics praised the film for its emotional depth and the cast's performances. The father-daughter dynamic between Kagiso and Tshimillo Modupe was highlighted as a standout element of the film.

== Sequel ==
The sequel, Losing Lorato 2 was released on 2 August 2024 exclusively on Netflix.

== Awards ==
The film was submitted to the International Indian Film Academy Awards 2020 to qualify as a nominee for the Award for Best Film. Losing Lerato received several nominations and awards.

- Golden Era Humanitarian Narrative Award (2020)
- Best Child Performance for Tshimillo Modupe at the Idyllwild International Festival of Cinema (2020)

== See also ==
- South African cinema
- List of South African films
