= Losing Lerato 2 =

2024 South African Film

- Directed by: Zolani Phakade
- Written by: Ricardo Arendse; Kagiso Modupe
- Produced by: Kagiso Modupe; Rashaka "Rush" Muofhe
- Starring: Kagiso Modupe; Patrick Mofokeng; Nefisa Mkhabela; Dineo Langa
- Cinematography: Gavin Sterley
- Edited by: Gugu Sibanze; Ravi Desai; Nqobizwe Ndlangamandla
- Music by: K.O
- Production companies: Bakwena Productions; Kagiso Modupe Film
- Distributed by: Netflix
- Release date: 2 August 2024
- Running time: 96 minutes
- Country: South Africa
- Languages: English; Zulu

Losing Lerato 2 is a 2024 South African action drama film released on Netflix. It is a sequel to the 2019 drama film Losing Lerato. The film was directed by Zolani Phakade and written and co-produced by Kagiso Modupe, who also stars in the lead role. The film also features an ensemble cast of Nefisa Mkhabela, Zolisa Xaluva, Aubrey Poo, Dineo Langa, Lerato Marabe and Zia Kani. It was on 2 August 2024.

== Plot ==
Lerato's father, Thami Radebe has been in prison for 15 years. He was finally released due to illness, Lerato swore to do anything to make sure they aren't parted again. Following the events of the first film, Thami struggles to rebuild his life and maintain his bond with his daughter Lerato. As he struggles with the legal and emotional aftermath of his actions.

Thami encounters a new health challenge as he requires a kidney transplant.

When Lerato's appeals to her wealthy stepfather are ignored, she takes drastic actions to save her father's life, demonstrating determination and love.

== Cast ==
- Kagiso Modupe as Thami Radebe
- Samela Tyelbooi as Thando
- Aubrey Poo as Doctor "X" Xolani
- Nefisa Mkhabela as Lerato
- Zia Kani as Olwethu
- Dineo Langa as Ceo Joyce
- Zolisa Xaluva as Jake
- Lerato Marabe as Karabo
- Mapaseka Koetle as Lolitha
- Patrick Mofokeng as Station Commander
- Nolo Phiri as Detective Nkala

== Music ==
Losing Lerato 2

Soundtrack album by K.O
- Released: 2024
- Length: 3:24
- Languages: English; Zulu language
- Label: Sony Music Africa
- Producers: Mfundo Nxumalo; Ntokozo Mdlu

The film's soundtrack album and background score were composed by Ntokozo Mdluli (K.O).

All music is composed by K.O.

Track list
No.	Title	Writer(s)	Singer(s)	Length
1.	"On The Way"	Mfundo Nxumalo	Ntokozo Mdlu	3:24

== Production ==
Casting

In July 2024, Nefisa Mkhabela was reported to star in lead roles replacing Kagiso Modupe’s real-life daughter Tshimollo as the older version of Lerato.

== Release ==
Losing Lerato 2 was released on Netflix on 2 August 2024.

== Reception ==
Mbali Mbatha of News24 criticised the film's script and storytelling, and considered Tshimollo Modupe, who portrayed young Lerato in the original film, a better performer than Nefisa Mkhabela, who played the adult character. Writing for Afrocritik Seyi Lasisi wrote: "Although Losing Lerato 2 quickly adopts an incoherent disposition and is littered with unnecessary and prolonged scenes, its attempts to explore the intricacies of the family can be appreciated. Even when the acting is largely underwhelming and the story development shoddy, one can still admire the film’s botched attempt at addressing the theme of sacrificing for one’s own family." He gave the film 2/5 stars.

== See also ==
- South African cinema
- List of South African films
