= 4th Content Creator Awards =

Social Media award show

- Awarded for: Outstanding achievements in the social media community
- Sponsored by: Samsung Galaxy
- Date: 17 October 2026
- Venue: The Galleria, Sandton
- Country: South Africa
- Hosted by: Mpho Popps

Highlights
- Most awards: Grace Mondlana (2), Vafa Naraghi (2)
- Most nominations: Grace Mondlana (3), Vafa Naraghi (3)

Television/radio coverage
- Network: TBA

The 4th Content Creator Awards are an annual presentation of the Content Creator Awards represented by Samsung Galaxy honouring outstanding achievements in the social media community. The show was hosted by South African comedian and television personality Mpho Popps.

== Winners and nominees ==
The eligibility period for the 2026 DStv Content Creator Awards ran from 14 May 2026 to 5 July 2026. Nominees were announced on 23 September 2026. Winners are listed first in bold.

Content Creator of the Year	Automative Content
**Grace Mondlana**; Donovan Goliath; Nadia Jaftha; Primo9teen; Vafa Naraghi	**Tebogo Moropa**; Chris Rogers; Mpoomy Ledwaba; Rory Petzer; Sam from TheCarScene; Shane Assad
Public Choice	Emerging Creator
**Olwethu Ncapayi**; Anika Dambuza; Garfieldzar; Grace Mondlana; Tanaka Dube	**Sine RSA**; Anica Kiana; Isaac Mehlape; Sibo Mchunu; Socially Jordie
YouTube Creator of the Year	Wildcard
**Lasizwe**; Centtwinz; Noko Mashaba; Shev and Dev; SMWX; Zayaan	**Lindosasmr**; Nathan Molefe; Yombusoo Cthandiweii; Zinhle Africa
Dance Creator	Style
**Chad Jones**; Benny Jnr; Ludopie; Rudi Smit; TDO Thando	**Yasmin Furmie**; Kimos; Lue & Rue; Pumla Dineo; Wiseman Zitha
Best Comedy Content Creator	Sound of Tomorrow
**Ikho**; Céline Tshika; Sipho2skiits; Tanaka Dube; Titus Mokou	**Mikhalé Jones**; Chesrae Megan; Carter Najar; Lordkez; Lukiemusic; Teagan’s Things
Trendsetter	Podcast of the Year
**Grace Mondlana**; Anika Dambuza; Kim Jayde; Lingling; Primo9teen	**SMWX**; GenC Podcast; Mindset Profits; The Makhs; The Sias du Plessis Show; Wisdom & Wellness
Best Online Social Series	Impact Creator
**Vafa Naraghi**; Dalin Oliver; Nuri Gallow; Simo Ziqubu; Stefan van der Merwe; Zayaan	**Joshwideawake**; Conrad Koch & Chester Missing; Shandor Larenty; Nick Hamman; Theshaya
Expert Voices	Thumbstopping
**Miss Angler**; Bella Monsoon; Kriya Gangiah; Stefan van der Merwe; The Conscious Psychologist	**Vafa Naraghi**; Céline Tshika; Chris Rogers; Kaytee Shots; Planettobii
Best Creator x Brand Collaboration	Best Online Series
**Nabilah Kariem– Le Creuset**; Baxbara – Delicious Festival; Lukiemusic – #IAmOriginal88; Nabilah Kariem – Samsung; Sni Mhlongo – Vaseline	**The Adventures of Noko Mashaba**; Awkward Dates; Hungry & Shameless; Kickin it with Kim Jayde; SABS Network

== Special awards ==
=== Excellence in Branded Content ===
- Olivier Agency

=== #CapturedWithGalaxy ===
- Kaytee Shots

== Creators with multiple wins and nominations ==
Creators who received multiple awards
Wins	Creator
2	Grace Mondlana
2	Vafa Naraghi

Creators who received multiple awards
Wins	Creator
3	Grace Mondlana
3	Vafa Naraghi
2	Anika Dambuza
2	Kim Jayde
2	Lasizwe Dambuza
2	Nabilah Kariem
2	Noko Mashaba
2	SMWX
2	Stefan van der Merwe
