= Allan Stratton =

Canadian playwright and novelist

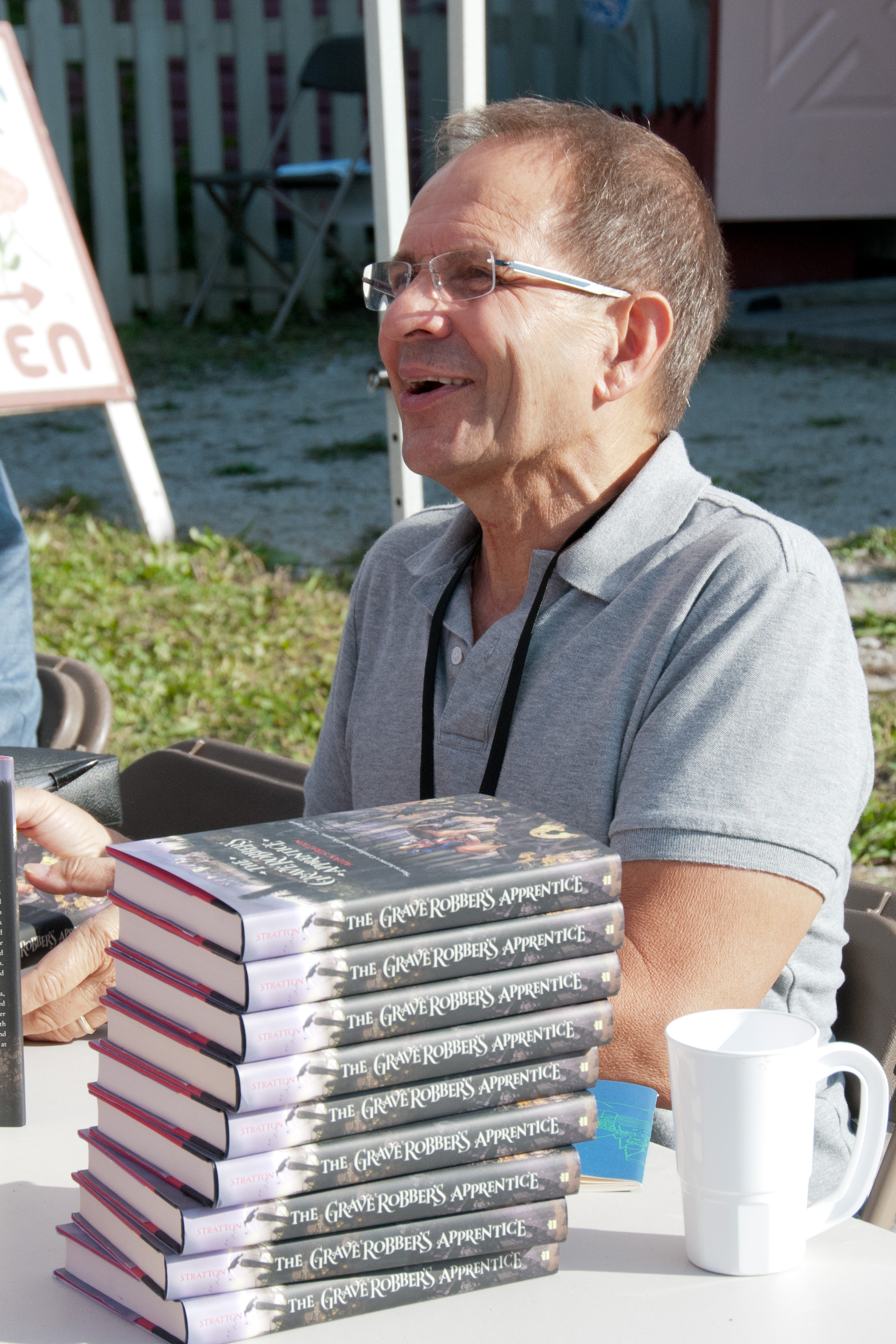
Stratton at the Eden Mills Writers' Festival in 2012

Allan Stratton (born 1951) is a Canadian playwright and novelist.

== Life and career ==
Stratton was born in Stratford, Ontario, and began his professional arts career while he was still in high school when James Reaney published his play The Rusting Heart in the literary magazine Alphabet. It was broadcast on CBC Radio in 1970. The focus of his early work, however, was acting. While working on an Honours degree in English at Victoria University in the University of Toronto (1973), he performed with the Stratford Festival and the Huron Country Playhouse. After completing his M.A. at The Graduate Centre for the Study of Drama, University of Toronto (1974), he appeared with regional theatres across the country, originating a range of roles in new works by playwrights such as James Reaney, Rex Deverell and Sharon Pollock.

Throughout this period, Stratton continued to write, and in 1977 his first professional stage play, 72 Under the 0, was produced by Christopher Newton at the Vancouver Playhouse. A few years later, he turned to writing full-time, thanks to the success of Nurse Jane Goes to Hawaii, a play that has had over three hundred productions internationally. Rexy!, a satire about Mackenzie King, was premiered in the winter of 1981. It was performed across Canada, and won the Chalmers Award, the Canadian Authors' Association Award, and the Dora Mavor Moore Award, all for Best New Play.

In 1982, he moved to New York City, where he was a member of the Playwright/Director Unit of Lee Strasberg's Actors Studio, chaired by Arthur Penn. While there, Christopher Newton commissioned Stratton to write an adaptation of the classic Labiche farce Célimare for the Shaw Festival Mainstage. The production went on to tour to the National Arts Centre, and was the first Shaw production aired on CBC Television. Papers, another of his plays with an international publication and production record, followed soon after. It premiered at the Tarragon Theatre, and won a Chalmers Award for Outstanding New Play, as well as being nominated for the 1986 Governor General's Award for English language drama the Dora Mavor Moore Award.

Stratton returned to Canada in the late 1980s, and moved to Montreal, where he wrote the comedy-of-bad-manners Bag Babies, which opened at Theatre Passe Muraille in 1990. It was nominated for the City of Toronto Book Award and produced across Canada, as well as in the United States, Edinburgh and London. A few years later, he was commissioned to adapt Dracula for the Skylight Theatre. A female van Helsing, a comic look at Victorian mores, and a recreation of the novel's sweep distinguish this adaptation which was nominated for the Dora Mavor Moore Award for Best New Play, Large Theatre Division, 1995.

Other plays include The 101 Miracles of Hope Chance, which premiered at the Manitoba Theatre Centre; Joggers, which premiered at Toronto Free Theatre (now Canadianstage); A Flush of Tories, which premiered at Prairie Theatre Exchange, and aired as a drama special on CBC Television; and the radio play When Father Passed Away.

In the mid-1990s, Stratton headed the Drama Department at the Etobicoke School of the Arts, where he taught senior directing, acting and playwriting. His students won many awards, including three consecutive Best New Play Awards at the Sears Drama Festival provincial championships. However, classroom and administrative duties restricted his creative time and consequently he returned to full-time writing.

For the past few years, his focus has been fiction. The results of this work include two novels released in fall 2000: The Phoenix Lottery, a social satire about art, commerce and untidy family relationships, published by the Riverbank Press; and Leslie's Journal, a young adult novel about sexual abuse in adolescent dating relationships, published in Canada and in the United States by Annick Press, and in foreign translation in Korea, Slovenia, France, and Germany.

The Phoenix Lottery was nominated for the Stephen Leacock Medal for Humour, the Canadian National Institute for the Blind's Talking Book of the Year Award, and the TORGI Award; it received a Stephen Leacock Award of Merit. Leslie's Journal was selected for the American Library Association's "Best Books for Young Adults, 2002", "Popular Paperbacks for Young Adults, 2003" and "Best Reading List, 2003". Other citations include The Canadian Bookseller's "The Best of Canadian Young Adult: Gems of 2000", the Young Adult Learning Services Association (A.L.A.)'s "Quick Picks for Reluctant Young Adult Readers 2001", the McNally Robinson Booksellers' "Our Choice 2001", and the Canadian Children's Book Centre's "Best Books for Young Adults".

Leslie's Journal was selected for The American Library Association's "Best Books for Young Adults, 2002", "Popular Paperbacks for Young Adults, 2003" and "Best Reading List, 2003". Other citations include The Canadian Bookseller's "The Best of Canadian Young Adult: Gems of 2000", The Young Adult Learning Services Association (A.L.A.)'s "Quick Picks for Reluctant Young Adult Readers 2001", The McNally Robinson Booksellers' "Our Choice 2001", and The Canadian Children's Book Centre's "Best Books for Young Adults". A revised edition incorporating cyberbullying in its narrative structure was released in 2008.

Allan's next novel was the internationally acclaimed bestseller Chanda's Secrets, 2004. Set against the HIV/AIDS pandemic in sub-Saharan Africa, this adult/young adult crossover novel is being published and distributed to countries including the United States, Great Britain, France, Germany, Italy, the Netherlands, Slovenia, Brazil, India, Japan, Vietnam, China, Taiwan, Korea, Australia, New Zealand, South Africa, and the African francophonie. It has won the American Library Association's Michael L. Printz Honor Book for Excellence in Young Adult Literature, the African Studies Association's Children's Africana Book Award for Best Book for the Older Reader, and a host of other best book awards, citations and nominations in Canada, the United States and Europe.

In 2010, Chanda's Secrets was made into the award-winning film Life, Above All. The film, a German/South African co-production, premiered at the Cannes International Film Festival, where it won the Prix François Chalais. A winner at various other international film festivals, it was South Africa's entry for Best Foreign Film at the 2011 Oscars, and was one of nine finalists.

Allan followed up Chanda's Secrets, with the stand-alone sequel Chanda's Wars, 2008. It was published to acclaim by HarperCollins in the US and Canada, by Deutscher Taschenbuch Verlag in Germany, Van Goor Uniebok in the Netherlands, Editora Pruno in Brazil, and Bayard Jeunesse in France. It won the Canadian Library Association's Best Young Adult Canadian Book Award and was a Junior Library Guild selection.

Borderline, 2010, was published to acclaim in the United States, Canada and France and was nominated for multiple awards including the Arthur Ellis Award, CLA Best YA Fiction Award, and the inaugural John Spray Award. It was an ALA Best Fiction and Bank Street's Best Book selection.

The Grave Robber's Apprentice, 2012, was published by Harper in the United States and Canada, Faber and Faber in the UK, and is also scheduled for publication in France and Brazil. It is a Times of London's Children's Book of the Week and has been nominated for The Governor General's Award and the Silver Birch Award.

Curse of the Dream Witch will be published by Faber and Faber in spring 2013 and by Scholastic Canada, with publication by Bayard Jeunesse, France, and others, scheduled later. Allan's second adult novel, The Resurrection of Mary Mabel McTavish will be published by Dundurn Press in 2014.

Aside from his novels and plays, Allan has written for international events, including the evenings for Stephen Sondheim, Robert Rauschenberg and Guy Laliberté at The Harbourfront Centre World Leaders' Festival, Toronto. He also maintains an active public speaking and theatre adjudication schedule. In private life, he enjoys reading, weightlifting, and travel; his interests have taken him to Africa, Asia, the Middle East, the Caribbean and throughout Europe and North America. For several years, he volunteered at a Manhattan soup kitchen, and has undergone Santerian purification rituals, witnessed an exorcism in Botswana, and slept between rail cars behind the former Iron Curtain.

His work is published internationally by HarperCollins, Faber and Faber, Penguin Books, Samuel French, The Riverbank Press, Annick Press, Deutscher Taschenburg Verlag, Allen and Unwin, The Chicken House, Bayard Jeunesse, Asunaro Shobo, Hsiao Lu Publishing, Random House: Joong Ang, Zalozba Mis, Van Goor, Thuong Huyen Books, Hangilsa Publishing Company, Editora Planeta, Editora Pruno, Sinnos, Scholastic Canada, Coach House Press, and Playwrights Canada, among others, and has been widely anthologized. He and his spouse live in Toronto with their four cats.

=== Personal life ===
Stratton is gay and happily married.

== Prizes and honours ==
- 1981 Chalmers Award for Rexy!
- 1981 Dora Mavor Moore Award for Rexy!
- 1985 Chalmer's Award, Outstanding New Play for Papers
- 2005 Canadian Library Association Young Adult Canadian Book Award for Chanda's Secrets
- 2005 Independent Publisher Book Award (U.S.A.), Best Juvenile and YA Fiction, for Chanda's Secrets

Runners-up, booklists, etc.

- 1986 Finalist, Governor General's Award for Papers
- 1986 Finalist, Dora Mavor Moore Award for Papers
- 1992 Finalist, Toronto Book Awards for Bag Babies
- 1996 Finalist, Dora Mavor Moore Award - Best New Play for Dracula
- 2000 Stephen Leacock Award of Merit for The Phoenix Lottery
- 2002 American Library Association: "Best Books for Young Adults" for Leslie's Journal
- 2002 McNally Robinson Booksellers Online: "Our Choice 2001" for Leslie's Journal
- 2005 Michael L. Printz Honor Book for Excellence in Young Adult Literature, awarded by the American Library Association, for Chanda's Secrets
- 2005 American Library Association, Best Books for Young Adults Chandra's Secrets
- 2005 Booklist, Editor's Choice for Chanda's Secrets
- 2005 Shortlisted, Ontario Library Association: Forest of Reading White Pine Award for Chanda's Secrets
- 2009 Shortlisted, Ontario Library Association: Forest of Reading White Pine Award for Chanda's Wars
- 2011 Shortlisted, Ontario Library Association: Forest of Reading White Pine Award for Borderline

== Works ==
=== Novels ===
- Phoenix Lottery (2000) Riverbank Press
- Leslie's Journal
- Chanda's Secrets (2004) Annick Press
- Chanda's Wars (2008) HarperCollins Canada
- Borderline (2010) HarperCollins Canada
- Grave Robber's Apprentice (2012) HarperCollins Canada
- The Resurrection of Mary Mabel McTavish (2013) Dundurn Press
- The Dogs (2015)

=== Plays ===
- Bingo! (1977)
- Nurse Jane Goes To Hawaii (1980)
- Rexy! (1981)
- Joggers (1982)
- Friends Of A Feather (1984)
- Papers (1985)
- The Hundred and One Miracles of Hope Chance (1987)
- Bag Babies (1990)
- A Flush of Tories (1991)
- Dracula (1995)
- The Dogs (2015)
