= Life, Above All =

2010 film

- Film poster
- Directed by: Oliver Schmitz
- Screenplay by: Dennis Foon; Allan Stratton
- Based on: Chanda's Secrets by Allan Stratton
- Starring: Khomotso Manyaka
- Cinematography: Bernhard Jasper
- Edited by: Dirk Grau
- Distributed by: Sony Pictures Classics
- Release date: 18 May 2010
- Running time: 100 minutes
- Country: South Africa
- Language: Northern Sotho

Life, Above All is a 2010 South African drama film directed by Oliver Schmitz. It was screened in the Un Certain Regard section of the 2010 Cannes Film Festival. The film was selected as the South African entry for the Best Foreign Language Film at the 83rd Academy Awards and made the final shortlist announced in January 2011. The film was adapted from the 2004 novel Chanda's Secrets by Allan Stratton.

== Plot ==
Chanda, a poor 12-year-old South African girl who lives in a township near Johannesburg, must make funeral arrangements after her baby half-sister Sarah dies. Her mother Lillian, a seamstress, is paralyzed by grief and her alcoholic step-father Jonah by drink. Their next-door neighbor, Mrs. Tafa, helps care for Chanda's two younger half-siblings, Iris and Soly. Chanda is friends with Esther, an orphaned schoolmate who turns to prostitution to survive. At the end of the funeral, Jonah promises to support his family, but he later steals money from Lillian and runs away.

Mrs. Tafa takes an ailing Lillian to a quack doctor, but he is no help. After a drunken, emaciated Jonah is returned to Lillian by his sister, he again disappears, and rumors circulate that the family has AIDS. A shaman tells Lillian that her house is bewitched, so she decides that she needs to go home to Tiro, the village where she grew up, and she bids a tearful farewell to her children. When a badly-beaten Esther turns up, Chanda takes her in and finds out that Esther may have contracted AIDS. Mrs. Tafa demands that Chanda force her to leave but Chanda refuses. Too distraught to take her exams, Chanda runs home and hears that her sister may have fallen into a deep hole along with another child, but Iris is only hiding, and the boy's fall is broken and his life saved by the body of Iris' dead father Jonah, which is extracted from the hole.

After Jonah's funeral, Mrs. Tafa warns Chanda not to tell anyone that she thinks her step-father had AIDS as people will say that her mother also suffers from the disease, whereupon Chanda announces that she will go to Tiro and bring Lillian back to the township. Esther gives Chanda money for the trip, but when Chanda arrives in Tiro, her grandmother tells her that Lillian's AIDS is a punishment from God and that she was sent away. Chanda tracks down her mother, who is dying alone under a tree, and hires an ambulance to carry them home. There, neighbors threaten to stone Chanda for bringing a curse on the township, but Mrs. Tafa defend her and asks the neighbors to pray for Lillian. At Lillian's death bed, Mrs. Tafa begs Chanda to forgive her for trying to protect her from shame and confesses that her late son also had AIDS. The neighbors sing for Lillian as she dies.

== Cast ==
- Khomotso Manyaka as Chanda Kabelo
- Keaobaka Makanyane as Esther Macholo
- Harriet Lenabe as Mrs. Tafa (as Harriet Manamela)
- Lerato Mvelase as Lillian
- Tinah Mnumzana as Aunt Lizbet
- Aubrey Poolo as Jonah
- Mapaseka Mathebe as Iris
- Thato Kgaladi as Soly
- Kgomotso Ditshweni as Dudu
- Rami Chuene as Aunty Ruth

== Reception ==
The film received positive reviews from film critics. Review aggregator Rotten Tomatoes reports that 82% out of 71 professional critics gave the film a positive review, with a rating average of 7.02/10. In his review, Roger Ebert gave the film four stars, stating that it "earns the tears it inspires. The film is about deep human emotions, evoked with sympathy and love." He praised the young actors as "remarkable": "Manyaka and Makanyane have grave self-possession; they never even slightly overact."

== See also ==
- Cinema of South Africa
- List of submissions to the 83rd Academy Awards for Best Foreign Language Film
- List of South African submissions for the Academy Award for Best Foreign Language Film
