= Master Harold...and the Boys (2010 film) =

Master Harold... and the Boys
- Promotional poster
- Directed by: Lonny Price
- Screenplay by: Nicky Rebello
- Story by: Athol Fugard (play)
- Produced by: Michael Auret; Zaheer Goodman-Bhyat; David Pupkewitz; Morris Ruskin
- Starring: Freddie Highmore; Ving Rhames; Patrick Mofokeng
- Cinematography: Lance Gewer
- Edited by: Ronelle Loots
- Music by: Philip Miller
- Distributed by: Focus Films; Spier Films; Shoreline Entertainment
- Release date: March 17, 2010 (Cape Winelands)
- Running time: 87 minutes
- Countries: United States; United Kingdom; South Africa
- Language: English
- Budget: $3 million

Master Harold...and the Boys is a 2010 drama film which is based on the original theatre play of the same name by Athol Fugard, directed by director Lonny Price. The cast includes Freddie Highmore and Ving Rhames.

== Plot ==
Seventeen-year-old Hally, a white South African, has a bad relationship with his biological father and is torn between his father's expectations and opinions of him and those of his surrogate fathers, black waiters named Sam and Willie. Young Hally is obliged to laugh at his father's racist jokes and perform humiliating tasks like empty chamber pots. By contrast, Sam exposes Hally to many positive experiences. After being humiliated by his father, Sam shows Hally how to be proud of something he's achieved by helping him build and fly his own kite.

One day, Hally receives news that his real father, a violent alcoholic, is coming back home from a long stint in a hospital. Hally, distraught with this news, unleashes years of anger and pain on his two black friends.

== Production ==
Master Harold and the Boys began filming in and around Cape Town, South Africa in mid-January, 2009 over a five-week period. It is one of the first feature films in South Africa to be shot with the red camera format. This film has a budget of just under $3 million. Apart from its two international actors (Freddie Highmore & Ving Rhames), Nugent and American director Lonny Price, this film is a fully South African film. Waterfront Post will post-produce this film, with Spier Films owning copyright. All the HOD's (Head of Department) are South African, including Director of Photography Lance Gewer from the Oscar-winning Tsotsi, editor Ronelle Loots, production designer Tom Gubb and Pierre Viennings (wardrobe). Philip Miller is composing the music.
