= Vinolia Mashego =

South African actress (1963–2020)

- Born: Vinolia Mashego; 16 April 1963; South Africa
- Died: 3 April 2020 (aged 56); Pretoria, South Africa
- Other names: V-Mash
- Occupations: Actress, Television host, MC, Entertainer
- Years active: 1990–2020
- Children: Coachella Randy
- Father: Collin Mashego

Vinolia Mashego (16 April 1963 – 3 April 2020), popularly known as V-Mash, was a South African actress, television host, MC and entertainer. She is best known for the roles in the television serials such as Muvhango and Isibaya as well as presenting the 90s musical program Jam Alley.

== Personal life ==
Mashego was born on 16 April 1963 in South Africa. Her father was Collin Mashego who is a former television host of the show Lapologa in the early 1980s. Her younger sister was Prelley Seale.

She had one son, Oratile Masedi. Masedi is a social media personality, popularly known as Coachella Randy.

She died in her sleep on 3 April 2020 aged 56 at her residence in Mamelodi, Pretoria. Death cause is unknown, but her father suggested it may be due to prolonged asthma. In April 2020, the channel Moja Love donated R200,000 to Mashego's family: R50,000 to the funeral and remaining R150,000 to her children.

== Career ==
In early 1990s, she made a starring role as "Pearl" in the CCV-TV drama serial Di Wele Makgolela. In 1994, she became a television presenter at CCV-TV, where she co-hosted the program Jam Alley. After that, she became host on SABC1 until 2001. However, she was fired by producers for increasingly erratic behavior. In early 2000s, Mashego joined with the SABC1 soap opera Generations and played the role of "Hilda Letlalo". The role became very popular, where she played the role for many years.

In 2010, she made the recurring role of "Meme's mother" on the SABC2 soap opera Muvhango. In 2013, in the episode "I Had It All" of SABC2 co-dumentary series, she exposed her career with rise and falls in the acting career, where the episode was dedicated to her. Then in January 2014, she joined the Mzansi Magic as a presenter and hosted the live interactive music video show "PLS Call Me". In the meantime, she joined with the cast of the second season of the Mzansi Magic soap opera Isibaya. In the soapie, she played the role "Keletso". Later in the year, Mashego acted in the SABC1 drama serial Mutual Friends with the role "Patty".

In 2019, she appeared on the SABC2 telenovela Giyani: Land of Blood and played the recurring role of "Khwinana". Prior to her death, she worked as the host of the comedy show BhekaMina S'kubambile on Moja Love, DStv channel 157.

== Filmography ==
Year	Film	Role	Genre	Ref.
2001	Generations	Hilda Letlalo	TV series	
2010	Muvhango	Meme's Mother	TV series	
2019	Giyani - Land of Blood	Khwinana	TV series	
2014	Isibaya	Keletso	TV series	
2014	Mutual Friends	Patty	TV series	
