= 18th Feather Awards =

LGBT award show

- Awarded for: Outstanding achievements in LGBTQ+ community
- Sponsored by: Proudly South African
- Date: 5 November 2026
- Venue: Constitution Hill, Johannesburg
- Country: South Africa
- Hosted by: Zizo Beda; Khaya Dladla; Lula Odiba; Tyrone Willard

The 18th Feather Awards are 2026 annual presentation of the Feather Awards honoring outstanding achievements in the LGBTQ+ community.

== Background ==
The nominees for the 18th Feather Awards were announced on 1 October 2026 at Constitution Hill, Johannesburg. The 2026 edition was held under the theme The "Signature Edition". The awards ceremony took place on 5 November 2026 at Constitution Hill in Johannesburg. It was hosted by Zizo Beda, Khaya Dladla and Lula Odiba, with Tyrone Willard presenting the red carpet. The ceremony introduced the Thami Dish Award, with Lelo Meslane becoming its inaugural recipient, the Designer of the Year Award was renamed the Maria McCloy Award in honour of the late media personality Maria McCloy, Baby Joe Correira received the Simon Nkoli Award.

== Winners and nominees ==
Nominees were announced on 1 October 2026. Winners are listed first in bold.

Drama Queen of the Year	Social Media Personality of the Year
**Credo V Daniels**; Limpopo Boy; Mel Viljoen	**Coachella Randy**; Grace Mondlana; Primo Baloyi
Hot Chick of the Year	Musician of the Year
**Desiree Komi**; Dominic Zaca; Kitso Kgori	**Manana**; Zee Nxumalo; Thando Zide
Hunk of the Year	Best Styled Individual of the Year
**Teddy Geldart**; S'dumo Mtshali; Vuyo Biyela	**Kagiso Mogola**; Siya Bunny; Banele Ndaba

== Honorees ==
Honorees are in bold.

Diva Extraordinaire of the Year	Best Sports Personality of the Year
Miss Gaga	Desiree Ellis
Role Model of the Year	Cutest Couple of the Year
Felicia Mabuza-Suttle	Fanney Tsimong & Nhlanhla Ndaba
Best LGBTQ+ Private Sector Initiative	Best LGBTQ+ Public Sector
Absa	Prof. Zozo Nene
Fag Hag of the Year	Maria McCloy Award
Thobeka Mbane	Maria McCloy
Best LGBTQ+ Youth Initiative	Global Feather of the Year
Other Village People	Hillary Shimi
Rainbow Parenting Award	Simon Nkoli Award
Salome Lebeko	Baby Joe Correira
Thami Dish Award
Lelowhatsgood
