= Nefisa Mkhabela =

South African actress

- Born: Nefisa Tarisca Mkhabela; 14 February 2002 (age 24); Soweto, Johannesburg, South Africa
- Education: University of Johannesburg
- Occupations: Actress; influencer
- Years active: 2018–present
- Notable work: House of Zwide

Nefisa Tarisca Mkhabela (born February 14, 2002) is a South African actress and influencer. She is best known for her starring role as Ona Molapo in e.tv telenovela House of Zwide and Losing Lerato 2 as Lerato.

== Early life ==
Mkhabela was born on 14 February 2002, in Soweto, Johannesburg. She attended the University of Johannesburg where she studied Bachelor's of Law after finishing her matric at Greenside High School.

== Career ==
Mkhabela made her television acting debut in the recurring role of Mbali on the 1Magic drama series Unmarried Wives, first appearing in the series premiere in 2018. In 2020, she reprised her role, showing off her skills as an actress.

In 2021, she landed a leading role in the Mzansi Original Movie called Ispaza Sasekhaya. Later that year Nefisa landed her first starring role in television when she was cast as Ona Molapo, a young fashion designer who navigates the world of fashion with her BFF played by Shalate Sekhabi, in the e.tv soapie House of Zwide. In 2024, she played a lead role as Lerato, in a film Losing Lerato 2 and also appeared on a soapie Kleva-ish as Mandy.

== Filmography ==
Year	Film	Role	
2018	Unmarried	Mbali	Recurring role
2021–2026	House of Zwide	Onalerena Molapo	Lead role
2023	Kleva-ish	Mandy	Main role
2024	Losing Lerato 2	Lerato	Lead role, season 2
2024	How to ruin love	Omphile	Starring role

== Awards and nominations ==
Year	Association	Category	Nominated works	Result	Ref.
2024	Royalty Soapie Awards	Outstanding Newcomer	House of Zwide	Won	
2024	National Film and TV Awards	Best New Comer	House of Zwide	Nominated	
