= Kudi Maradzika =

Zimbabwean filmmaker

- Born: Kudakwashe Maradzika; Zimbabwe
- Education: University of Cape Town
- Occupations: Filmmaker, Screenwriter, Producer, Actress
- Years active: 2010–present
- Known for: Bad Influencer

Kudakwashe "Kudi" Maradzika is a Zimbabwean filmmaker, screenwriter, producer and actress based in South Africa. She is known as the creator and executive producer of the Netflix original crime drama series Bad Influencer.

== See also ==
- Cinema of Zimbabwe
- South African television
