= Yoh! Christmas =

South African romantic comedy television series

- Zulu: Yoh! Christmas
- Genre: Romantic comedy
- Created by: Johnny Barbuzano; Tiffany Barbuzano
- Based on: Home for Christmas
- Starring: Katlego Lebogang; Siya Sepotokele; Didi Makobane; Anthony Oseyemi; Sivuyile Ngesi; Kagiso Modupe; Hlomla Dandala; Ntobeko Sishi
- Country of origin: South Africa
- Original languages: Zulu; English
- No. of seasons: 1
- No. of episodes: 6

Production
- Producers: Johnny Barbuzano; Tiffany Barbuzano; Morishe Matlejoane
- Running time: 30 minutes
- Production company: BBZEE Productions

Original release
- Network: Netflix
- Release: 15 December 2023

Related
- Yoh! Bestie

Yoh! Christmas is a South African romantic comedy television series inspired by the Norwegian series Home for Christmas. It premiered on Netflix on 15 December 2023, with Netflix introducing this new series in place of the annual series How to Ruin Christmas.

The series is predominantly in Zulu and English.

== Plot ==
=== Synopsis ===
The story revolves around Thando, a single, 30-year-old woman under pressure from her family. To avoid the usual questioning about her love life during the holidays, Thando lies about having a boyfriend. Now, she has 24 days to find someone to bring home for Christmas.

=== Episode 1: "The Christmas Lie" ===
In the first episode of "Yoh! Christmas," we are introduced to Thando Mokoena, a single 30-year-old physiotherapist grappling with the societal expectations of marriage and children. The pressure peaks during a family dinner when her younger brother announces his wife's pregnancy with twins, shining an uncomfortable spotlight on Thando's single status. Through Thando's voiceover, we learn about her previous engagement to Sifiso, which ended abruptly on the day of their lobola ceremony, sending her into a three-year span of singledom. Despite her proclaimed independence, she harbors unresolved feelings for Sifiso, who has since married and started a family, even using the name Thando had reserved for her future son.

As Thando endures the continuous commentary on her love life, especially from her mother, Nellie, she impulsively announces that she will bring a boyfriend to the family's Christmas Eve dinner. Now, with the holiday fast approaching, she is on a comedic and desperate search to fulfill this promise. Her journey is complicated by her closeness to her best friend, Charles, and her interaction with a new doctor, Ben Bakare, both of whom she overlooks as potential romantic interests. The episode culminates with Thando's phone being snatched by a thief, only to be retrieved by Simon, a charming stranger, setting up a potential new romantic trajectory.

== Cast ==
- Katlego Lebogang as Thando Mokoena
- Siya Sepotokele as Charles
- Didi Makobane as Riri
- Anthony Oseyemi as Ben Bakare
- Sivuyile Ngesi
- Sthandiwe Kgoroge as Nellie Mokoena
- Tumisho Masha as Simon
- Didie Makhubane as Riri
- Sello Motloung as Sam Mokoena
- Kagiso Modupe
- Wayne van Rooyen
- Hlomla Dandala
- Laura-Lee Mostert as Mikayla
- Ntobeko Sishi as Motheo
- Altovise Lawrence as Jo
- Lerato Mvelase as Minnie
- Dorothy-Ann Gould as Lulu
- Mpho Popps
- Tiffany Barbuzano as Melanie

=== About the Cast ===
- Katlego Lebogang, playing the lead character Thando, began her acting career on stage during her student days, transitioning to television with roles in "Pinky Pinky" (2020), "Javia!" (2021), "The Vegan and the Hunter" (2022), and "Spinners" (2023).
- Siya Sepotekele, known for his versatility, has appeared in various television shows and movies including "Is'phindiselo" (2022), "Diep City" (2022), "#Karektas" (2021), and "Broken Vows" (2017).
- Fezile Mkhize, portraying Sifiso, is a multifaceted talent as a doctor, model, actor, and television presenter, first appearing in the "Presenter Search on 3" in 2018 and later in "Generations: The Legacy" and "Adulting."
- Bongani Dube, a comedian with 14 years of experience in stand-up comedy, has authored "The Life, Lies, and Laughter of a Comic" and received multiple nominations for his comedic work.
- Sivuyile Ngesi, an award-winning presenter and actor, has been in the entertainment industry for over a decade, with acting credits in "African Queens: Njinga" (2023), "The Woman King" (2022), "Tali's Baby Diary" (2021), and "Still Breathing" (2020).

== Episodes ==
=== Season 1 (2023) ===
No. overall	No. in season	Title	Duration	Original release date
1	1	"The Christmas Lie"	30 min	15 December 2023
2	2	"Dating"	30 min	15 December 2023
3	3	"Something New, Something Old"	30 min	15 December 2023
4	4	"Naughty but Nice"	30 min	15 December 2023
5	5	"Cut the Cake"	30 min	15 December 2023
6	6	"Christmas Wishes"	30 min	15 December 2023

== Development and production ==
"Yoh! Christmas," created by Tiffany and Johnny Barbuzano of BBZEE Films, is adapted from the Norwegian TV series "Hjem Til Jul" (Home for Christmas) by Per-Olav Sørensen. The series reflects a growing trend in the South African entertainment industry of localizing international formats to resonate with domestic audiences, a creative choice that sparks debate about the originality and cultural authenticity in storytelling. The Barbuzanos are recognized for their contributions to South African television with works such as "Izoso Connection," "Sober Companion," and "Still Breathing," showcasing their capability to craft compelling narratives that resonate with local viewers.

== Reception ==
"Yoh! Christmas" has received positive reviews. Notable aspects highlighted by critics include the strength of the ensemble cast, the humor, and the creative adaptation of the storyline. The protagonist of the series is noted for being uniquely flawed yet relatable, contributing to an engaging plot. However, as of December 18, 2023, the series does not have enough reviews to receive a Rotten Tomatoes score.
