= Katlego Lebogang =

South African actress (born 1996)

- Born: Katlego Lebogang; 27 July 1996 (age 30); Johannesburg, South Africa
- Education: Verney College; University of Cape Town
- Occupation: Actress
- Years active: 2019–present
- Notable work: Yoh! Christmas; Law, Love & Betrayal

Katlego Lebogang (born 27 July 1996) is a South African actress. She is best for her main roles in Yoh! Christmas (2023) as Thando Mokoena and Law, Love & Betrayal (2026) as Bakang Mokgotso.

== Early life ==
Lebogang was born in Johannesburg, South Africa. She matriculated from Verney College, and graduated from the University of Cape Town in 2019 where she obtained Bachelor of Arts (Honours) in Theatre & Performance. She appeared in several television commercials when she was a student.

== Career ==
Lebohang made her first television acting role in a Showmax horror film Pinky Pinky in 2020. In 2021, she played the recurring role of Mbali in a dance drama Jiva!. The same year, she begged her first lead role in 1Magic medical drama Wounds as Mabalwa Rhadebe. In 2023, she played the lead of Thando Mokoena in Yoh! Christmas. She played the role of Phumeza in Spinners the same year. In 2024, she appeared in a miniseries White Lies as Nonzi Weber. In December 2024, she played the lead role of Zinhle in Soft Life.

In early 2026, Lebogang played the main role of Bakang Mokgotso in Law, Love & Betrayal season 2, and appeared in Yoh! Bestie playing the lead role of Thando Mokoena she previously played in Yoh! Christmas. In August, she played the starring role of Imani Washington in American comedy drama Average Joe season 2.
