= Emmanuel Castis =

South African actor and singer (born 1976)

- Born: Emmanuel Castis; 1 February 1976 (age 49); Johannesburg, South Africa
- Education: University of the Witwatersrand
- Occupation: Actor
- Years active: 1999–present
- Spouse: Sharlene Economou
- Website: emmanuelcastis.com

Emmanuel Castis (born 1 February 1976) is a South African actor, singer, and dancer of Greek descent. He is best known for his role as Steve Stethakis in the popular serials Isidingo, and as Cole Harris on the soapie Scandal!.

== Personal life ==
He was born on 1 February 1976 in Johannesburg, South Africa to Greek parents, Mike Castis and Maro Castis. He graduated with a degree in dramatic arts at the University of the Witwatersrand.

He is married to his longtime partner Sharlene Economou. They got engaged at Komati Gorge Lodge in Mpumalanga.

== Career ==
He started acting in 1997 with theatre plays, along with PJ Sabbagha and the Forgotten Angle Dance Theatre Company, where he played the role of Lennox in the play Macbeth. Later, he became involved in musical theatre. Meanwhile, he made his television debut with the television soapie Isidingo in 1999. In the serial, he played the role of Steve Stethakis, which became highly popular. In 2004, he won the People's Choice Award for Best Actor in a television soapie. Afterwards, he also appeared in the serial Erfsondes as the lead male protagonist. Additionally, he has been nominated twice for South African Film and Television Awards (SAFTA) for Best Actor in a television series. In 2008, he won the celebrity reality competition of the South African version of Dancing with the Stars.

In addition to his acting career, he has pursued singing and released his debut music album titled South of Nowhere in 2008. He achieved success in the reality show Strictly Come Dancing, winning season 4 in the same year. Furthermore, he released the single "Stop Running" in 2011, followed by "Alive" towards the end of 2015.

In 2014 he was a judge for the SAFTAs. He also appeared in two international serials, Wild at Heart and Black Sails. In the meantime, he starred in several blockbuster films: Cryptid, Eternity and Tremors 5: Bloodlines. Then he toured around the world with the Broadway musical Jersey Boys, as one of the leads Nick Massi. He later received positive critical acclaim and received a nomination for Best Actor in a musical at the Naledi Theatre Awards.

== Filmography ==
=== Film ===
Year	Title	Role	Ref.
1999	Dazzle	Mark	
2006	Cryptid	Theo	
2010	Eternity	Jan Roux	
2015	Tremors 5: Bloodlines	Dr. Michael Swan	Direct-to-video
2016	Happiness Is a Four-letter Word	Le Roux	
2024	A Family Affair	Charles	
2024	The Shakedown	Dovi Diamond	
2024	Greytown Girl	Eddie Gibson	
2025	G20	TBA	Post-production

=== Television ===
Year	Title	Role	Ref.
1998	Isidingo	Steve Stethakis	
2005	Isidingo: The Need	Steve Stethakis	Episode #1.1
2005	Binnelanders	Sergio	26 episodes
2006–2007	One Way	Brent Peterson	22 episodes
2008	Wild at Heart	Victor	Episode #3.3
2012	7de Laan	Yannis	TV series
2016	Black Sails	Court Official	Episode: "XXVII."
2016	General Hospital	Kostas	2 episodes
2017	Broken Vows	Chris	TV series
2017	Thula's Vine	Jaco	TV series
2017	Days of Our Lives	Dr. Bretts	1 episode
2018	Liberty	Victor	TV mini-series; episode #1.3
2019	Trackers	Suleiman Daoud	5 episodes
2020	Isono	Mannie Anatopoulos	12 episodes
2020, 2023	Warrior	Clyde Nichols	4 episodes
2021	The Other Side of the Nebula	Hitman Gino	Episode: "Night Shift"
2025	Bad Influencer	Babi Barlos	
