= Nomatriquency: The Funeral =

- Genre: Comedy, Entertainment
- Created by: Lasizwe
- Country of origin: South Africa
- Original languages: English, Zulu, Afrikaans
- No. of episodes: 3

Production
- Production company: TD Media

Original release
- Network: YouTube
- Release: 30 October 2025 – present

Nomatriquency: The Funeral is a South African YouTube series created by Lasizwe. The series derives from his personal and difficult life experiences, where he plays as his famed fictional character "Nomatriquency" also popularly known as "Tricky Baby".

== Background ==
Nomatriquency is a female character that Lasizwe plays on his YouTube channel. In 2019, the bubbly character with her broken English, loud mouth and colourful wigs trended on social media.

The series follows a murder mystery of Nomatriquency moments after she received her title deed. The family tragedy turns into chaos, secrets, and suspicion when her death raises more questions than answers.

Lasizwe speaking to Times Live on what inspired the show:

The story was inspired by my ex. I went through a horrible breakup, so this story is me grieving my ex so I can bury him and continue with my life so I can fall in love again. I’m using my life experiences to be creative and not let them consume me.

== List of episodes ==
No.	Date of Episode	Episode Name	Ref.
1	30 October 2025	Who KILLED Nomatriquency? The Family Secrets BEGIN	
2	6 November 2025	Funeral Secrets And Family LIES Revealed	
3	13 November 2025	The SHOCKING truth about Nomatriquency's Pregnancy Revealed	
