= Patrick Mofokeng =

South African actor (born 1969)

- Born: Patrick Mofokeng; 15 May 1969 (age 57); Cape Town, South Africa
- Education: CAP Arts School in Cape Town
- Occupation: Actor
- Years active: 1994–present
- Height: 1m 58cm

Patrick Mofokeng (born 15 June 1969) is a South African actor. He is best known for his roles in the films Invictus, Who Am I? and Master Harold...and the Boys.

== Early life ==
He was born on 15 May 1969 in Cape Town, South Africa. He later moved to Johannesburg. But after few years, he resettled in Cape Town. He completed a Diploma in Drama and Speech from CAP Arts School in Cape Town.

== Career ==
In 1997 he made his acting debut with the TV movie Pride of Africa. In 1998, he appeared in Jackie Chan's film Who Am I where he played a minor role as 'Village Hunter'. In 2008 he acted in the film Surprise and played the role of 'Gerald Judge'. Meanwhile, he won the Golden Horn Award for the Best Actor in a TV Drama for his role in The Provider in 2007. He also won the award for the Best TV drama for the serial When we were black.

In 2005, he played the role 'King Sibiya' in the television drama Zone 14. The role became highly popular. Apart from that, he played guest appearances in the television serials Backstage and Yizo Yizo, Scandal!, and Isidingo. In the popular serial Scandal!, he played the role 'Mlungisi Ngema'. He also starred in the second film The Good Provider in 2006, where he played the leading role of 'Solomon Sithole'. In 2011, he played the supportive role of 'Jimmy' in the eleventh season of the SABC1 AIDS drama series Soul City. In 2020, he starred in the South African Netflix original series Blood & Water.

== Filmography ==
Year	Film	Role	Genre	Ref.
1997	Pride of Africa	Somabele	TV movie	
1998	Who Am I?	Village Hunter	Film	
2001	Dr Lucille: The Lucille Teasdale Story		TV movie	
2005	Man to Man	Zachary	Film	
2005	A Warm Heart	Napoleon Dzombe	Short film	
2005	Zone 14	King Sibiya	TV series	
2006–07	When We Were Black	Rev. Serote	TV series	
2008	Gangster's Paradise: Jerusalema	Vusi	Film	
2008	Surprise!	Gerald Judge	Home Video	
2008–present	Scandal!	Mlungisi Ngema	TV series	
2008	Silent Witness	Chingola Doktor	TV series	
2009	Wild at Heart	Captain Lekota	TV series	
2009	Invictus	Linga Moonsamy	Film	
2010	Themba	Luthando	Film	
2010	Master Harold...and the Boys	Willie	Film	
2010	Africa United	Police Sargeant Sam	Film	
2011	A Million Colours	Albert	Film	
2019	Losing Lerato	Station Commander	Film	
2020	Blood & Water	Brian Bhele	TV series	
2024	Losing Lerato 2	Station Commander	Film	
