= Kagiso Lerutla =

South African executive and accountant

Kagiso Lerutla is a South African executive and group chief financial officer of the City of Ekurhuleni and TED (conference) speaker.

Kagiso Lerutla was born in South Africa. He attained a Bachelor of Commerce from the University of Limpopo and a BCom Accounting Honours degree from the University of Johannesburg and is a member of the South African institute of chartered accountants.

Lerutla began his career at the Auditor General of South Africa and in 2019 he was appointed as group chief financial officer for City of Ekurhuleni becoming the youngest GCFO in South Africa at the age of 33. In 2022, Lerutla was nominated for the Public Sector CFO of the Year award at the CFO Awards in South Africa.

Lerutla, a qualified Accountant and who worked for the Auditor General of South Africa (AGSA) before joining Ekurhuleni municipality in 2014 as HOD for Compliance and Governance was appointed the City's Financial Manager in 2019 and promoted to Ekurhuleni municipality City Manager.

In 2026 April, Lerutla was arrested along side the Ekurhuleni Metro Police Department's suspended Chief, Julius Mkhwanazi after revelations of corruption surfaced at the Madlanga Commission of Inquiry into Corruption in the Justice cluster.
