= Zodwa Wabantu =

South African media personality, socialite and dancer

Zчурка
- Born: Zodwa Rebecca Libram; Soweto, Gauteng, South Africa
- Occupations: Media personality; socialite; dancer
- Years active: 2015–present
- Children: 1

Zodwa Wabantu is a South African media personality, socialite and dancer.

== Career ==
Libram left home at the age of 16 and began hustling. She later began her dancing career, dancing in clubs. She has been a notable dancer in the last few years, and had feud with fellow dancer Skolopad. She performed at the Doek on Fleek event. In 2017, she signed a record deal with Afrotaiment.

In 2018, Wabantu appeared in the season premiere of MTV 2 South Africa's Behind the Story. Her videos have been shared throughout social media, and have a dedicated YouTube channel. In October 2021, she was appointed as brand ambassador for Mazda Menyln. In late 2021, she will host SAAPA Awards.

== Controversy ==
Wabantu makes waves for the fact that she performs without wearing panties. In 2017, she was banned from performing in Zimbabwe due to the nature of her performances. She was deported from Zambia over similar issues less than a year later. In 2022, she has been banned from performing in Malawi by the Ministry of Tourism, Culture and Wildlife for her lewd performances.

== Personal life ==
Wabantu purchased land for her business during the winter of 2018.

She made waves on social media regarding her breakup with her now ex-boyfriend after she publicly accused him of being a scamster.

She has her own show called Zodwa Wabantu: Uncensored.
