= Kagiso Modupe =

South African actor

- Born: Kagiso Modupe; 19 August 1982 (age 43); Phokeng, Rustenburg, South Africa
- Occupations: Actor, producer, businessman, MC, motivational speaker
- Years active: 2006–present

Kagiso Modupe is a South African actor and producer. He is best known for his roles in the popular serials Losing Lerato, Gog' Helen and Unpredictable Romance.

== Personal life ==
He is married to Liza Lopes, a film producer. The couple has two daughters and 1 son. His elder daughter, Tshimollo acted with Kagiso in the film Losing Lerato as the lead role 'Lerato'.

== Career ==
In 2019, he starred in lead role 'Thami' in the blockbuster Losing Lerato. The film was funded by Kagiso and his wife Liza. The film screened in cinemas across South Africa and eSwatini. The film was not screened in Botswana due to red tape. The film received critical acclaim and won six awards at the Idyllwild International Festival of Cinema in California. Kagiso won the Best Actor Feature award, Samela Tyelbooi won Best Actress Feature, his daughter Tshimollo won the Best Child Performance award. Besides the major awards, the film won Golden Era Humanitarian Narrative Award, Best Original Score Award and Festival Favourite Award.

In the meantime, he dubbed the voice for "Tyler Perry" of Mzansi. He also acted in the popular television serial Scandal! with the role 'Mangaliso "Mangi" Nyathi'. After a few years, he quit from the role.

Apart from acting, he became an author with the book Along Came Tsakani.

In 2024, in collaboration with Bakwena Productions, BET Africa and Paramount Africa, Modupe produced Pound 4 Pound, a 13-part South African TV drama series which explores the world of women's boxing in Africa.

In October 2024, Modupe was served a letter of demand for an alleged non-payment issue related to the production of Pound 4 Pound. Along with Rashaka Muofhe (Modupe's partner and co-founder of Bakwena Productions), Modupe is accused of failing to pay some of the crew and cast who worked on Pound 4 Pound. Over 50 people, including well-known South African actor Brandon Auret, have joined forces to take Modupe and Muofhe to court with a class-action lawsuit.

== Filmography ==
Year	Film	Role	Genre	Ref.
2005–2018	Scandal!	Mangaliso "Mangi" Nyathi	TV series	
2006	The Good Fight	Red Jacket, executive producer	TV movie	
2012	Gog' Helen	Policeman	Film	
2014	Step Up to a Start Up	Rorisang Selepe	Film	
2017	Unpredictable Romance	Mpumelo	Film	
2019	Losing Lerato	Thami	Film	
2021	Jiva!	Menzi	TV series	
2023	Yoh! Christmas		Film	
2024	Losing Lerato 2	Thami Radebe	Film	
