= Don Mlangeni Nawa =

South African actor (1959–2025)

- Born: Don Mlangeni Eric Nawa; 7 June 1959; Boksburg, Transvaal, Union of South Africa
- Died: 16 April 2025 (aged 65); South Africa
- Occupation: Actor
- Years active: 1989–2025
- Notable work: Isidingo
- Children: 5

Don Mlangeni Eric Nawa (7 June 1959 – 16 April 2025) was a South African actor. He was best known for his roles in the popular serials 'Sgudi 'Snaysi, Isidingo and The Throne.

== Background ==
Nawa was born in Boksburg, Union of South Africa on 7 June 1959.

Nawa was married to Regina Nawa and had five children. He died on 16 April 2025, at the age of 65.

== Career ==
Nawa started his acting career in the theatre. His first television credit was in the lead role of David in the Zulu television mini series Ubambo Lwami in 1989. In 1992 he had his breakthrough role as Zakhe in the drama serie Hlala Kwabafileyo. In 1993, he made his first appearance in the popular comedy series 'Sgudi 'Snaysi in which he played a loan shark, often playing across co-star Joe Mafela. He starred in the series for five seasons. In 1995 Nawa had a one-episode appearance in the Cycle Simenon series, a French crime series.

Nawa became a household name in what is arguably his best known-role of as Bra Zeb Matabane in the iconic and long-running soap opera Isidingo. In 2006 he received a South African Film and Television Award (SAFTA) Golden Horn Award for Best Actor in a TV Soap for his role. Part of the original cast that launched the series in 1998, he left the show in 2014 because of a dispute with the producers.

In 2018, he took on the lead role of Moseki, a royal family member and younger brother of the queen, in the popular Mzansi Magic telenovela The Throne. That same year, he received the Lifetime Achievement Award at the 2018 Royalty Soapie Awards for his contribution to the television industry.

In 2019, Nawa made his film debut in the film Losing Lerato in the role of a SWAT Commander. In 2020, he joined the cast of the television series Legacy for two seasons. From 2021 to 2023 he starred in The Estate playing Shadrack Mokobane, an activist defending the interest of his impoverished community in Thembalethu. Also in 2023, he appeared in one episode of the hit series Shaka iLembe as King Langa.

Nawa's last appearance was in the Netflix South Africa drama series Soon Comes Night in 2024.

== Filmography ==
Year	Film	Role	Genre	Ref.
1986–1992	'Sgudi 'Snaysi	Laqhasha	TV series	
1989	Ubambo Lwami	David	TV miniseries	
1992	Hlala Kwabafileyo	Zakhe	TV series	
1995	Cycle Simenon	Barman Hôtel	TV series	
1998–2014	Isidingo	Zebedee Matabane	TV series	
2005–2006	Stokvel	Laquashe	TV series	
2013–2014	Zaziwa	Himself	Talk show	
2015	Rockville	Diliza	TV series	
2015–2017	Uzalo	Dhlomo	TV series	
2018, 2023	The River	Thato Mokoena	TV series	
2018–2021	Abomama	Mfundisi	TV series	
2018–2019	The Throne	Prince Moseki Kwena	TV series	
2019	The Republic	Bhambatha	TV series	
2019	Losing Lerato	SWAT Commander	Film	
2020–2021	Legacy	John	TV series	
2021–2023	The Estate	Shadrack Mokobane	TV series	
2022	Good Men	Judge Ngubane	TV series	
2022	Makoti	Zandisile	TV series	
2022	uMbali	Cyril Qongqo	TV series	
2023	Shaka iLembe	King Langa	TV series	
2024	Soon Comes Night	Mandla Shabane	Netflix Series	
