= Anelisa Phewa =

South African actor and musician

- Born: Anelisa Phewa; 3 May 1983 (age 43); Kwa-Zulu Natal, South Africa
- Education: St. Dominic's Academy
- Alma mater: University of Cape Town
- Occupations: Actor; singer; dancer; musician
- Years active: 1989–present
- Height: 175 cm (5 ft 9 in)

Anelisa Phewa (born 3 May 1983), is a South African actor, singer, dancer and musician. He is best known for the roles in the films Attack on Darfur, Themba and More Than Just a Game.

== Personal life ==
Phewa was born on 3 May 1983 in Kwa-Zulu Natal, South Africa. In 2001, he matriculated from St. Dominic's Academy in Newcastle, Kwa-Zulu Natal. Then in 2005, he graduated with his BA degree in Theatre and Performance from the University of Cape Town.

== Career ==
He made his television debut in 1993 with the television serial Generations and played the role "Lungelo". In 2006, he rendered his voice to the lead role of Pax Africa in the children's animated series URBO: The Adventures of Pax Africa, which aired on Saturday mornings on SABC3. Then in 2007, he made the film debut with a minor role in the film The World Unseen. In the same year, he acted in the film More Than Just a Game, which received critics acclaim.

After that, he played a supportive role in the television serial Divers Down. Then in 2009, he played the role "Lwazi Ntili" in the serial Montana. In the same year, he performed in the stage play Private Lives. In 2012 he joined the SABC2 soap opera 7de Laan and played the role of "Sifiso". He continued to play the role until 2016. On 28 September 2019, he joined with charity program "Cupcakes 4 Kids with Cancer" to celebrate the National Cupcake Day held at Pack ‘n Spice in Horison, Roodepoort.

== Filmography ==
| Year | Film | Role | Genre | Ref. |
|---|---|---|---|---|
| 2017 | Generations | Lungelo | TV series | |
| 2006 | URBO: The Adventures of Pax Afrika | Pax Afrika | TV series | |
| 2007 | The World Unseen | African Pedestrian | Film | |
| 2007 | More Than Just a Game | Pro Malepe | Film | |
| 2007 | Divers Down | Thabang | TV series | |
| 2009 | Montana | Lwazi Ntili | TV series | |
| 2009 | Attack on Darfur | Janjaweed Militia | Film | |
| 2010 | Themba | Andile Khumalo | Film | |
| 2011 | Shreds and Dreams2 | Mthunzi | TV series | |
| 2011 | Stokvel | Percy Zulu | TV series | |
| 2012 | 7de Laan | Sifiso Ndlela | TV series | |
| 2012 | Leonardo | Silvio Pirelli | TV series | |
| 2015 | Ingoma | Constance's father | TV movie | |
| 2016 | Abo Mzala | Music Manager | TV series | |
| 2017 | Harvest | Mzwandile | TV series | |
| 2018 | Unmarried | Steve | TV series | |
| 2019 | Shuga | Andile | Film | |
| 2019 | iThemba | Ntsika | TV series | |
| 2020 | The Queen | Johnny | TV series | |
| TBD | A Royal Surprise | | TV movie | |
