= Aubrey Poolo =

South African actor

- Born: Aubrey Poolo; 30 November 1976 (age 49); Pretoria, South Africa
- Occupation: Actor
- Years active: 2010–present

Aubrey Poolo (born 30 November 1976) is a South African actor. He is best known for the roles in the films Five Fingers for Marseilles, Life Above All, Generation The Legacy and Madiba.

== Personal life ==
He was born on 30 November 1976 in Attredgeville, a township of Pretoria, South Africa to a family of politicians. He was raised by his grandmother with the help of elders of the Pan Africanist Congress of Azania (PAC).

== Career ==
At a very young age, he joined the television program Legae la bana. In 2010, he made his film debut with the film Life, Above All. The film was screened in the Un Certain Regard section of the 2010 Cannes Film Festival. It was also selected as the South African entry for the Best Foreign Language Film at the 83rd Academy Awards and then made the final shortlist announced in January 2011. With the success of the film, he was selected for a minor role in the 2017 American television mini-series Madiba.

In 2017, he played the lead role of Unathi in the South African Western thriller film Five Fingers for Marseilles directed by Michael Matthews. It was later screened in the Discovery section at the 2017 Toronto International Film Festival and received critical acclaim.

== Filmography ==
Year	Film	Role	Genre	Ref.
2010	Life, Above All	Jonah	Film	
2017	Madiba	Coughing Man	TV Mini-Series	
2017	Five Fingers for Marseilles	Unathi	Film	
2024	Losing Lerato 2	Doctor "X" Xolani	Film	
2024	The Masked Singer SA	Himself/Owl	Reality Competition	
