= Mihlali Ndamase =

South Africa media personality (born 1996)

- Born: Mihlali Ndamase; November 29, 1996 (age 29); Kokstad, KwaZulu Natal, South Africa
- Education: Leaders in the Science of Fashion; Vega School
- Occupations: Influencer; businesswoman; make-up artist
- Years active: 2016–present
- Modeling information
- Height: 1.67 m (5 ft 6 in)

Mihlali Ndamase (born 29 November 1996) is a South African media personality, businesswoman and make-up artist. She is the founder of Siyasizana Foundation, Treasury and the co-founder of Malakyt. She was included in the Forbes Africa 30 Under 30 in 2021.

== Career ==
Ndamase began her career in 2016, when she launch her YouTube channel and made her television debut when she appeared on E! VIP Africa. Her channel grew quickly, surpassing 2 million views by late 2017, and later expanded into philanthropy by co-founding the nonprofit organisation Siyasizana Foundation with Dineo Nono. In 2019, she received a widespread recognition, winning Influencer of the Year and Best Beauty Influencer at the Cosmopolitan South Africa Influencer Awards, Socialite of the Year at the Feather Awards, and Next Big Thing at the South African Style Awards.

In 2021, she was named to Forbes Africa 30 Under 30 list. The same year, she appeared in the Showmax film Boxing Day. She founded Malakyt, a platform connecting clients with beauty specialists across South Africa. She was nominated at People Choice Awards in 2021 for African Social Star. In 2022, she made a cameo appearance on Generations: The Legacy and Netflix telenovela Savage Beauty.

She launched her fashion venture Mihlali's Kloset in November 2023, where she sold her used clothes on sale. In 2025, she opened the luxury boutique Treasury at The Marc in Sandton City. She hosted her "Beauty and the Beat" makeup masterclass. In December, she was announced as a guest presenter for the TikTok Awards Sub-Saharan Africa.
