= Lasizwe =

South African media personality (born 1998)

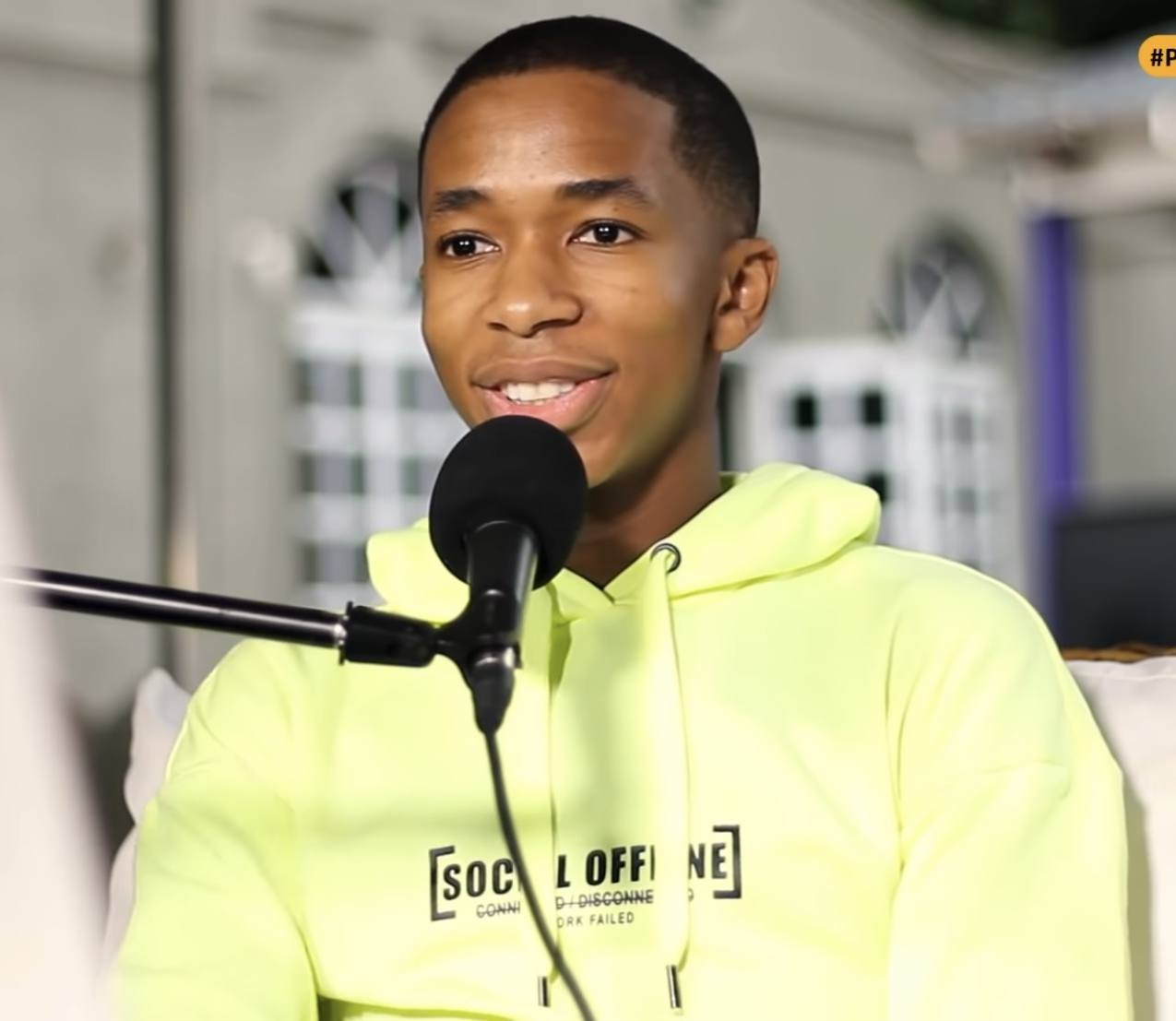
- Lasizwe on MacG Podcast
- Born: Thulasizwe Siphiwe Dambuza; 19 July 1998 (age 28); Soweto, Johannesburg, South Africa
- Other names: Lasizwe; Babes Wamaleyvels; Sweerie; Nomatriquency
- Education: Meredale Primary School; Mondeor High School
- Occupations: Media personality; actor; comedian; YouTuber
- Years active: 2015–present
- Relatives: Khanyi Mbau (half-sister)

YouTube information
- Channel: Lasizwe Dambuza
- Years active: 2017–present
- Subscribers: 1.22 million
- Views: 166 million
- Last updated: 26 August 2026
- Website: www.lasizwe.co.za

Thulasizwe Siphiwe Dambuza (born 19 July 1998), mononymously as known as Lasizwe, is a South African media personality, actor, comedian and YouTuber. He rose to fame by posting humorous videos of himself on social media in which he interprets the everyday behavior of South Africans.

Notably, he broke new ground as the first African to helm a reality TV show on MTV Africa Lasizwe: Fake It Till You Make It, garnering three successful seasons in less than two years. This earned him a spot on Forbes magazine the Forbes Africa 30 under 30. He is the creator and host of the YouTube series Awkward Dates, in which he goes on blind dates with various celebrities and also the creator and host of the YouTube game show, Drink or Tell the Truth. He created a YouTube comedy series, Nomatriquency: The Funeral in 2025.

== Early life and education ==
Lasizwe was born in Soweto, South Africa. He attended Meredale Primary, a mixed-race primary school in Meredale, south of Johannesburg, and then attended Mondeor High School in Mondeor. His mother, Lindiwe Dambuza (died in 2016) was a 40-year-old nurse at Lesedi Private Hospital, in a relationship with his father, Menzi Mcunu.

Dambuza in 2014

Along with his mother, his sister, Zonke Nkabinde, played a major role in his life, guiding and protecting him. Lasizwe noticed there was something different about him: that he was uncomfortable around boys but could relate to any feminine topic. At the age of 15 he recognized that he was gay.

== Career ==
Before starting his career, Lasizwe's mother took him for television auditions on a weekly basis across Gauteng from primary school. At the age of 12, she sat him down and explained that the weekly auditions were no longer financially viable for their family. He entered various competitions that gave away phones or audio-visual equipment. It was when he won a phone from a radio competition, which he used to start creating his first batch of content. Using his mother's laptop to record and learn basic video editing, he stored the videos on DVD discs and watched himself on the TV screen. The urge to be on TV led him to post videos on Facebook, and ultimately create relatable South African content. His first breakout video, Ek Sal Doom Jou, which was a skit based on news reports of a controversial pastor that sprayed the faces of his congregants with insect repellent in church. The video went viral which led to different brands approaching him for commercials.

Between 2020 and 2021, he managed to raise R2 million to impact students that were in need of registration fees. This was in light of the protests that took place in South Africa, where students were protesting for 'Fees must fall' and impacted the lives of 313 students, through the "R10 goes a long way" campaign.

In June 2022, he was featured on the Forbes Africa '30 Under 30'. Dambuza dedicated this achievement to his late parents. He wrote on Twitter:

From making videos using a phone in the streets of Pimville Soweto to making it onto #Forbes30Under30. Anything is possible. I dedicate this award to all my parents. I wish I had the opportunity to see their reactions this... Your boy is on FORBES.

=== Broadcast media ===
Lasizwe has made appearances on MTV Base Africa's You Got Got as one of the main presenters, and has presented on SABC 3's The Scoop Africa and SABC 1's The Real Goboza. He hosted an outdoor event with Mabala Noise and presented an award at the 2017 South African Hip Hop Awards. He was featured in a Nando's TV commercial and on Fanta's TV commercial as their new teen marketing director. In late 2017 he became a radio presenter on TouchHD. In 2018 he landed a role in hosting e.tv's youth show Craz-e World Live as well as VOOV TV's new show VOOVScoop.

In May 2019, he secured himself a deal to partner with GAME Stores. The deal followed after he had posted a video on his social media platforms that depicted his famed character "Nomatriquency" undergoing an interview for a position at GAME.

In July 2020, he starred on the Netflix movie, Seriously Single. In November 2020, he was the host of the SABC 1 and Telkom music show, Telkom Monate Vibes.

In September 2021, he partnered with Steers in the #NomatriquencyxSteers campaign that saw his famed character Nomatriquency getting a job at the brand. Later that year, he was the host of a Comedy Central Roast spin-off show.

On 1 April 2022, he starred on the e.tv television series Durban Gen. In that same month, he was nominated for favourite personality at the 2022 DStv Mzansi Viewers' Choice Awards. He is also set to make a cameo appearance on the African Netflix series, Savage Beauty.

In August 2022, Lasizwe won two Prism Awards for his online persona Nomatriquency. On 3 September 2022, he hosted the 16th edition of the annual South African Film and Television Awards.

In September 2023, he was the winner of the second season of Canon's hit reality TV series, The Perfect Picture. In November 2023, he was a cast member on Trevor Noah's comedy series competition, LOL: Last One Laughing South Africa, where the cast of entertainers compete for a R1 million prize on behalf of the South African charity of their choice.

In May 2024, Lasizwe was part of the panel for the Showmax and Laugh Africa Comedy, Roast of Minnie Dlamini.

In August 2025, he was nominated at the South Africa Social Media Awards for African Social Media Star of the Year, Most Popular Content Across Platforms and Social Media Personality of the Year.

In March 2026, he was one of Top 20 winners of the first ever Humaz Top 20 Awards 2026 in recognition of content creation.

In August 2026, he appeared on the third season of the South African singing competition series, The Masked Singer South Africa after he was revealed as the celebrity behind “The sushi” identity.

=== Music ===
In December 2017, he was featured in Babes Wodumo and Ntando Duma's music video for the song "Jiva Phez'kombhede".

=== YouTube ===
Lasizwe is a YouTuber with more than 80 million views on his videos. In April 2019, Lasizwe received the silver play button from YouTube for reaching 100,000 subscribers.

In April 2021, he launched the YouTube show, Drink or Tell the Truth, where celebrities are given the choice between answering a question truthfully, or drinking a shot of a concoction made by him.

In June 2023, Lasizwe launched his new YouTube show, Awkward Dates. The first episode aired on his YouTube channel in July, serving as a birthday present for him. The YouTube series is a comedy show where Lasizwe goes on blind dates with various celebrities.

Speaking about what inspired the show, he told Daily Sun that the idea came during some of the darkest times of his life:

I was going through a lot of depression and wasn't creative. One day, I watched a show called Chicken Shop Date by a UK content creator and got inspired. I started thinking about how I could make it better and more personal.

Following the show's success, it was nominated for Best Online Content at the 2024 South African Film and Television Awards. In April 2025, it was announced that the show will be premiered on Mzansi Magic following its success online. In June 2025, the show was removed from DSTV by MultiChoice. The decision reportedly followed the claim that most guests demanded to be paid. The guests claimed to have agreed only to appear on YouTube and not mainstream TV. This situation forced Lasizwe and Multichoice to terminate their contract.

In October 2025, Lasizwe launched the YouTube series, Nomatriquency: The Funeral, where he plays as his famed fictional character "Nomatriquency" also popularly known as "Tricky Baby".

In October 2026, Lasizwe won YouTube Creator of the year at the 4th Annual Content Creator Awards.

== Endorsements ==
In early 2018 Lasizwe became Teen Marketing Director for Fanta.

He was nominated for a Feather Award for Social media Personality of the Year, and presented with a People's Choice Award in 2021. He has also been named one of the top YouTubers in South African under the age of 24. In 2021, he was nominated as The E! African Social Star. He is also the first South African to secure an endorsement deal for a fictional character that he named "Nomatriquency".

In September 2023, he was winner of season 2 of Canon's hit reality TV series, The Perfect Picture, where he was awarded a coveted trophy along with a cheque of R150,000 and R100,000 worth of Canon gear.

In June 2024, Volvo Cars South Africa appointed Lasizwe and Thea Booysen as EX30 Champions to promote the company's newest electric vehicle, the EX30. During the campaign Lasizwe showcased a Autumn-Winter'24 Ready-to-Wear outfit designed by local fashion designer Nao Serati, which was inspired by Volvo's interior using AI technology.

== Filmography ==
Film & Television
Year	Title	Role	Notes
2010	Generations	Himself	Extra, soap opera
2015	Dinner With Vuzu	Himself	Contestant, TV show
2017	MTV You Got Got	Himself	Main cast, TV show
2017	The Scoop Africa	Himself	Main cast, TV show
2017	The Real Gaboza	Himself	Main cast, TV show
2018	Craz-e World Live	Himself	Main cast, TV show
2018	VOOVScoop	Himself	Main cast, TV show
2018	MTV You Got Got	Himself	Main cast, TV show
2019–present	@Lasizwe: Fake It till You Make It	Himself	Main cast, TV show
2020	Seriously Single	Himself	starring role
2020	Telkom Monate Vibes	Himself	Host
2022	Durban Gen	Himself	Occurring role
2022	Savage Beauty	Himself	cameo appearance
2023	LOL: Last One Laughing South Africa	Himself	Contestant, TV show
2023	The Perfect Picture	Himself	Contestant (winner), TV show
2024	Laugh Africa Comedy: Roast of Minnie Dlamini	Himself	Panel, TV show
2026	The Masked Singer South Africa	The Sushi	Contestant, TV show

== Awards and recognition ==
Year	Award	Category	Result
2018	Avance Media Awards	Ranked #7 on the 100 most influential young South Africans	Won
2018	Avance Media Awards	Lifestyle category	Won
2019	Feather Awards	Social Media Personality of the Year	Nominated
2021	People's Choice Awards	African Social Star 2021	Nominated
2022	2022 DStv Mzansi Viewers' Choice Awards	Favourite personality	Nominated
2022	Prism Awards	Media relations (Gold)	Won
2022	Prism Awards	Media relations (Silver)	Won
2025	South African Social Media Awards	African Social Media Star of the Year	Nominated
2025	South African Social Media Awards	Most Popular Content Across Platforms	Nominated
2025	South African Social Media Awards	Social Media Personality of the Year	Nominated
2026	Humanz Top 20 Awards	Digital Star	Won
2026	Content Creator Awards	YouTube Creator of the Year	Won
