= COVID-19 lockdown in South Africa =

COVID-19 countermeasure in South Africa

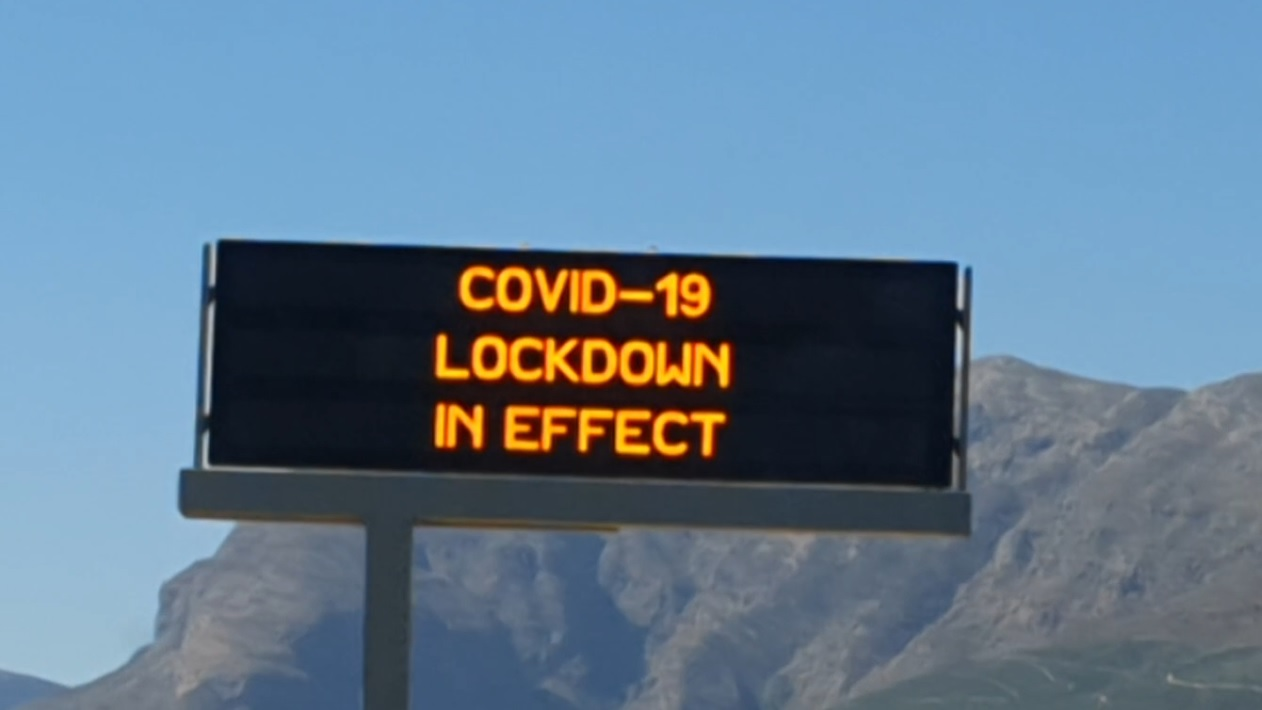
COVID19 sign N1 on highway Western Cape

The COVID-19 lockdown in South Africa was a series of stay-at-home orders introduced by the South African Government in response to the COVID-19 pandemic.

In January 2020, the World Health Organization (WHO) declared a global health emergency. The South African Government responded quickly with a public health response that included nationwide lockdowns. On 23 March 2020, President Cyril Ramaphosa announced a nationwide lockdown (under the disaster management act) to prevent the spread and widening of COVID-19 outbreak. A national lockdown was announced, starting on 26 March (at midnight) to 16 April 2020. The country began a hard lockdown (later categorized as Alert Level 5), as a precautionary measure.

Alert Level	Description
1	indicates a low COVID-19 spread with a high health system readiness;
2	indicates a moderate COVID-19 spread with a high health system readiness;
3	indicates a moderate COVID-19 spread with a moderate health system readiness;
4	indicates a moderate to a high COVID-19 spread with a low to moderate health system readiness;
5	indicates a high COVID-19 spread with a low health system readiness.

The first local death from the disease was reported on 27 March 2020. Lockdowns and social distancing were seen as a tool by governments to contain transmission and curb the spread of the disease. The initial lockdown was initially intended to last 21 days, from midnight of the 26th of March to 16 April 2020. This lockdown period was then extended to 35 days, up to 30 April 2020. During the Level-5 lockdown, all were told to “stay home” and remain indoors at all times. Those who were essential service workers were permitted to travel. Access to many commercial food and beverage services were closed during the lockdown. Realizing the economic impact the hard lockdown n the economy, President Ramaphosa announced a R500 billion economic recovery plan.

Many South African citizens responded positively to the limitation of their normal rights, in order to secure health and safety for all and preventing the spread of the virus further and the wearing of a face mask in public places became common practice, despite ambiguous regulations.

Lockdown exposed the incompetent state and its leadership Many institutions, in the face of another national mortality crisis, once again adopted misguided beliefs and theories. Much like President Thabo Mbeki's "AIDS-denialist" ideology, the Indaba Nurses Union advised its members to boycott the vaccine, Chief Justice Mogoeng Mogoeng reinforced vaccination hesitance through prayer and defended these beliefs, and shoe regulations (only closed toe shoes) were gazetted.

By January 2022, South Africa had reported 93 000 fatalities.

The nationwide lockdown had a significant effect on South Africa's economy and society. In 2020, the country's gross domestic product (GDP) contracted by approximately 7%, marking one of the largest declines in history. "South Africa's economy shrinks by 7% in 2020". Statistics South Africa. 9 March 2021. Workers faced major decline in income as millions of jobs were lost especially within hospitality, retail and tourism. "The impact of COVID-19 on the informal economy in Africa". International Labour Organization. 2020. Multiple companies within the small to medium staff range were forced to permanently close due to the decline in sales and customer demand. "South Africa Economic Update: Navigating Economic Headwinds". World Bank. 2023.

To mitigate these negative impacts, the government introduced a R500 billion economic relief exchange that included social grants, wage support and credit guarantees. Which they classified as one of the largest economic response packages in the developing world. "The R 500 billion stimulus package is one of the largest economic response packages in the developing world – Tito Mboweni". Parliament of the Republic of South Africa. 24 June 2020. Despite these interventions, inequality and poverty rates worsened. According to the National Income Dynamics Study (NIDS-CRAM), nearly half of South African households ran out of money to buy food during the strictest phase of lockdown."NIDS-CRAM Wave 1 Summary Report". University of Cape Town. 2020.

Socially, the lockdown deepened inequalities. Remote learning and work were difficult for low-income families due to limited internet access, and reports of domestic violence and mental-health distress increased."South Africa: COVID-19 pushes inequality in schools to crippling new level". Amnesty International. 22 February 2021.Nduna, M. (2022). "The impact of COVID-19 lockdown on domestic violence in South Africa". BMC Public Health. 22: 13422. doi:10.1186/s12889-022-13422-3. PMC 9123923. PMID 35597933.
