= South African Social Media Awards =

South African award ceremony

- Current: 2026 South African Social Media Awards
- Awarded for: Outstanding achievements in the social media community
- Country: South Africa
- First award: 27 November 2021; 4 years ago

The South African Social Media Awards (SASMAs) are an annual awards ceremony in South Africa that recognises achievements in social media and digital content. The awards recognise social media personalities, content creators, brands, agencies, campaigns and digital tools across various categories. The awards use a combination of judging and public voting to determine nominees and winners.

== History ==
The South African Social Media Awards (SASMA) were established in 2021 to recognise individuals, brands, agencies and campaigns involved in social media and digital content in South Africa. The inaugural live show was held at the Focus Rooms in Modderfontein, Ekurhuleni.

=== Online controversy ===
The 2024 awards faced public backlash after South African born German TikTok star Nara Smith was nominated for "Food Influencer of the Year" despite not being South African. Social media users and local creators criticized the omission of prominent local influencers like Onezwa Mbola and accused organizers of using Smith's name to drive online engagement.

Media personality Lasizwe Dambuza urged his supporters not to vote for him at the 2025 South African Social Media Awards because the paid voting system placed an unnecessary financial burden on fans.

== Categories ==
- African Social Media Star of the Year
- Fitness Influencer of the Year
- Automotive Influencer of the Year
- Beauty Influencer of the Year
- Best Photographer of the Year
- Social Media Brand Campaign of the Year
- Emerging Social Media Personality of the Year
- Fashion Influencer of the Year
- Food Influencer of the Year
- Gamer of the Year
- Popular Hashtag On Social Media
- Kid Influencer of the Year
- Motivational Speaker of the Year
- Best Social Media Newcomer of the Year
- Social Media Personality of the Year
- Podcast of the Year
- Popular Content Across All Social Media Platforms
- Popular SA Song On Social Media
- Best Social Media Use By A Radio Show
- Sports Personality of the Year
- Travel Personality of the Year
- Best Social Media Use By A TV Show
- Best Social Media Vlogger

== List of ceremonies ==
Edition	Date	Venue	Host	Ref
1st	27 November 2021	Focus Rooms, Modderfontein, Ekurhuleni	Weza Matomane	
2nd	26 November 2022	Focus Rooms, Modderfontein, Lethabong	Weza Matomane	
3rd	29 October 2023	Sandton Convention Centre	Weza Matomane, Summary, PD Jokes & DJ Khathu	
4th	23 November 2024	The Mosaïek Theatre	Weza Matomane, Zanele Potelwa, PD Jokes & Miss C King	
5th	22 November 2025	The Mosaïek Theatre	Zanele Potelwa & Musa Khawula	
6th	21 November 2026	The Mosaïek Theatre	Zanele Potelwa, Weza Matomane, PD Jokes & Khanyi Mars.	

== See also ==
- Content Creator Awards
