= Content Creator Awards =

South African award ceremony

- Current: 4th Content Creator Awards
- Awarded for: Outstanding achievements in the social media community
- Country: South Africa
- Presented by: DStv (former); Samsung Galaxy
- First award: 10 September 2022; 4 years ago

Content Creator Awards is an annual awards ceremony presented by Samsung Galaxy that recognizes achievements in the social media community across South Africa and Africa. It honors content creators, influencers, brands and organizations that have made notable contributions to the South African social media landscape through innovative movements, campaigns, projects and content.

== History ==
The awards were introduced in 2022 to recognise South African content creators and digital media productions. The inaugural awards received more than 1,500 entries across 23 categories, with more than 900 creators, brands, agencies and influencers registered. A judging panel was responsible for evaluating entries, while selected categories were decided through public voting. The first ceremony was held at The Galleria in Sandton on 10 September 2022 and was hosted by comedian Loyiso Madinga. The second edition took place on 9 September 2023 at The Galleria in Sandton hosted by Donovan Goliath. The ceremony had more than 90 nominees and recorded almost 40,000 public votes. The third edition was held on 12 October 2024 at Nelson Mandela Square and was hosted by Anele Mdoda. The awards was formerly represented by DStv with association of MultiChoice.

== Categories ==
The DStv Content Creator Awards categories include:

=== Public voting categories ===
- Creator of the Year
- Automative Content
- Public Choice
- Emerging Creator
- YouTube Creator of the Year

=== Non-public voting categories ===
- Dance Creator
- Style
- Best Comedy Content Creator
- Sound of Tomorrow
- Trendsetter
- Podcast of the Year
- Impact Creator
- Best Social Series
- Best Online Series
- Thumbstopping
- Best Creator x Brand Collaboration
- Expert Voices
- Wildcard

== List of ceremonies ==
Edition	Date	Venue	Host	Ref
1st	10 September 2022	The Galleria, Sandton	Loyiso Madinga	
2nd	9 September 2023	The Galleria, Sandton	Donovan Goliath	
3rd	12 October 2024	Nelson Mandela Square	Anele Mdoda	
4th	17 October 2026	The Galleria, Sandton	Mpho Popps	

== See also ==
- South African Social Media Awards
