= Feather Awards =

South African award ceremony

- Current: 18th Feather Awards
- Awarded for: Outstanding achievements in LGBTQ+ community
- Country: South Africa
- First award: 11 November 2008; 18 years ago

The Feather Awards is an annual South African awards ceremony that recognises individuals and organisations for their contributions to the LGBTQ+ community and broader society. Established in 2008, the awards honour achievements across categories including entertainment, media, business, sport and community activism. The ceremony also highlights individuals and initiatives that have contributed to LGBTQ+ visibility, representation and advocacy in South Africa.

== History ==
The Feather Awards were established in 2008 in South Africa by Thami Dish. The awards were created to recognise people who had made notable contributions to the LGBTQ+ community and to provide greater visibility to LGBTQ+ individuals in South African public life. Over the years, the ceremony expanded its categories to include entertainment, media, business, sport, fashion and community activism. It became an annual event featuring nominees and winners from South Africa's LGBTQ+ community and wider society.

== Category ==
- Hunk of the year
- Diva Extraordinaire of the Year
- Designer of the year
- Hot chick of the year
- Social Media Personality of the Year
- Best Styled Individual
- Sports Personality of the Year
- Drama Queen of the Year
- Musician of the Year
- Socialite of the Year
- Best Rainbow Parenting
- Cutest Couple of the Year

=== Special awards ===
- Fag Hag of the Year
- Role Model of the Year
- Media Award of the year
- Best LGBTQ+ Initiative in the Public Sector
- Best LGBTQ+ Youth Movement
- Global Feather of the Year
- African Feather of the Year
- Simon Nkoli Award
