= Hadebe =

Hadebe is a surname originally found in South Africa. The surname is closely related to Radebe, with some using the surnames interchangeably. Notable people with the surname include:

- Edward Hadebe (born 1987), South African footballer
- Khulani Hadebe, South African politician
- Monde Hadebe (born 1990), South African rugby union player
- Siyabonga Radebe, South African Entertainer/Actor..
