= Zaziwa =

South African talk show

- Genre: Talk show
- Directed by: Eric Mogale
- Presented by: Pearl Modiadie
- Country of origin: South Africa
- Original language: Multilingual
- No. of seasons: 3
- No. of episodes: 208 (until 24 December 2015)

Production
- Executive producers: Thabo Mphelo; Bokang Montjane
- Producer: Pulse
- Running time: 30 minutes

Original release
- Network: SABC 1
- Release: 22 May 2013

Zaziwa is a talk show broadcast on SABC1 channel in South Africa. It was hosted by Pearl Modiadie.

== Summary ==
The show invites accomplished South African Television personalities to share the music that helped shape their life. The show airs every Sunday at 20:30 on SABC 1.

== Guests ==
=== Season 1 ===
- Melusi Yeni
- Rebecca Malope
- Somizi Mhlongo
- Kgomotso Christopher
- Robert Marawa
- Motlatsi Mafatshe
- Mlangeni Nawa
- Bonang Matheba
- Bonnie Henna
- Salamina Mosese
- Thapelo Mokoena
- Zizo Beda
- DJ Cleo
- Lerato Kganyago
- Thembsie Matu
- Gabriel Temudzani
- Brenda Ngxoli
- Luthuli Dlamini
- Mzwandile Ngubeni
- Atandwa Kani
- Mandla Gaduka
- Tumi Morake
- Aaron Moloisi
- Luthando Shosha
- Andile Ncube
- Deborah Fraser
- Hlubi Mboya
- DJ Fresh
- Azania Mosaka
- Anga Makubalo
- Chichi Letswalo
- Nondumiso Tembe
- Zenande Mfenyana
- Zola
- Amanda Du-Pont
- Black Coffee
- AKA
- Ronnie Nyakale
- Zindzi Mandela
- Spikiri
- Yvonne Chaka Chaka
- KCi
- Siphokazi January
- Mpho Maboi
- Mshoza
- Dr Malinga
- Sthandwa Nzuza
- Dr Mthokozisi Shongwe (Surprise Guest)
- Thembalethu Mncube
- Ms. Cunningham (Surprise Guest)
- Sifiso Ncwane

=== Season 2 ===
- Maggie Benedict
- DJ Sbu
- DJ Euphonik
- Lorna Maseko
- Xoli Zondi
- Lebo Motsoeli
- Robbie Malinga
- Hlelo & Ntando Masina
- Seputla Sebogodi
- Sinazo Yolwa
- Zikhona Sodlaka
- Fikile Moeti
- Thembi Seete
- Noluthando Meje
- Siyabonga Radebe
- HHP
- Bujy Bikwa
- Mzambiya
- L'vovo Derrango
- Chomee
- Warren Masemola
- Zuluboy
- Thembisile Ntaka
- JR
- DJ Sbu
- Vicki Karras (Surprise Guest)
- Lundi Tyamara
- Kutloano Modise (Surprise Guest)
- Mandy Lachenicht
- Zanele Nyakale-Peterson
- Pitch Black Afro
- Kenny Lattimore
- Amon Mokoena
- Simba Mhere
- Gayton McKenzie
- Portia Modise
- Mi Casa
- DJ Tira
- Brian Temba
- Joyce Chauke
- Marietjie Bothma

=== Season 3 ===
- Ntokozo Dlamini
- Bongani M
- Khaya Dladla
