= Wavhudi Lidzhegu =

South African actor and mechanical engineer

- Born: September 28, 1999 (age 26); Muledane Thohoyandou
- Other name: Vhutshilo- Muvhango
- Education: National Certificate in Mechanical Engineering
- Occupations: Actor, mechanical engineer
- Known for: Acting
- Television: Muvhango

Wavhudi Lidzhegu (born September 28, 1999) is a South African actor and mechanical engineer. He is best known for his role as Vutshilo Mukwevho on the SABC 2 drama series Muvhango, which he portrayed for 8 years.

== Early life and education ==
Lidzhegu was born and raised in Muledane, Thohoyandou, Limpopo, living with his parents and a sibling. He developed an interest in acting during his school years, inspired by the works of playwright John Kani. After completing secondary school, he moved to Johannesburg and earned a National Certificate in Mechanical Engineering from Central Johannesburg College.

== Career ==
Lidzhegu began his acting career at the age of 16 while in grade 12. His professional break came when he won the role of Vutshilo, the son of Chief Azwindini Mukwevho (played by Gabriel Temudzani), on the popular soap opera Muvhango. He became a series regular, appearing on the show for eight years. Lidzhegu departed from Muvhango in August 2025.

Alongside his acting, he has maintained a parallel career as a mechanical engineer.

In 2020, Lidzhegu starred in the feature film Grade 10D, directed by Joseph Muthaphuli. Shot in Tshitereke village, the film explores the challenges faced by learners in the South African public school system. Lidzhegu played the lead role of "Mash," a student whose naïveté is shaped by a difficult environment rife with issues such as bullying and familial conflict. In discussing his character, Lidzhegu stated he hoped the film would help parents understand the motivations behind young people's decisions and that it would inspire viewers in similar situations to seek positive solutions.
