= Sibusiso =

Sibusiso (Busisiwe female) is a masculine given name derived from the Nguni word busisa, meaning "to bless". A shortened familiar versions is Sbu/S'bu. Notable people with the name include:

- Sibusiso Bengu (1934–2024), South African politician
- Barnabas Sibusiso Dlamini (1942–2018), the Prime Minister of Swaziland
- Sibusiso Dlamini (born 1980), Swazi football striker
- Sibusiso Duma (born 1984), South African serial killer
- Sibusiso Hadebe (born 1987), South African professional footballer
- Sibusiso Khumalo (footballer, born 1989), South African footballer
- Sibusiso Khumalo (footballer, born 1991), footballer
- Sibusiso Madubela (1971–1999), South African soldier and mass murderer
- Sibusiso Ndebele (born 1948), former Minister of Correctional Services serving from 2012 to 2014
- Sibusiso Ntuli (born 1988), South African football midfielder
- Sibusiso Nyembezi (1919–2000), South African writer known as a Zulu novelist, poet, scholar, teacher and editor
- Sibusiso Papa (1987–2014), South African professional footballer
- Sibusiso Sithole, South African rugby union player
- Sibusiso Vilakazi (born 1989), South African football player
- Sibusiso Vilane (born 1970), South African adventurer and motivational speaker
- Sibusiso Zuma (born 1975), South African professional football player
