= Flight of the Storks =

2012 television miniseries

- Genre: Action-adventure; Thriller
- Based on: Le Vol des Cigognes by Jean-Christophe Grangé
- Written by: Jean-Christophe Grangé; Denis McGrath
- Directed by: Jan Kounen
- Starring: Harry Treadaway; Rutger Hauer; Perdita Weeks; Clemens Schick
- Theme music composer: Éric Neveux
- Country of origin: France
- Original language: English
- No. of episodes: 2

Production
- Producers: Thomas Anargyros; Edouard de Vésinne
- Cinematography: Lance Gewer
- Editor: Anny Danché
- Running time: 180 minutes
- Production company: EuropaCorp Television
- Budget: €10,000,000

Original release
- Network: Canal+
- Release: 2012 – 2012

Flight of the Storks is a 2012 French English-language action thriller miniseries directed by Jan Kounen and based on Jean-Christophe Grangé's 1994 novel of the same name.

== Plot ==
Jonathan Anselme, a young English academic, teams up with Max Böhm, an amateur ornithologist, to follow storks on their migration from Switzerland to Africa. Max wants to find out why some birds never return from this journey. However, after Max is found dead in mysterious circumstances, Jonathan decides to make the trip alone, never suspecting that he will find himself caught up in an international web of intrigue. While the Swiss detective Dumaz investigates Max Böhm’s murky past, Jonathan is forced to confront his own troubled history. He uncovers a trail of grisly murders travelling through Bulgaria, Turkey, the Middle East, and the Congo along the pathway of the migrating storks and their deadly secret.

== Cast ==
- Harry Treadaway as Jonathan Anselme
- Rutger Hauer as Sonderman
- Perdita Weeks as Sarah Gabbor
- Clemens Schick as Hervé Dumaz
- Danny Keogh as Max Böhm
- Richard Lukunku as Gabriel
- Antoine Basler as Marcel Minaus
- Amr Waked as Doctor Djuric
- Grant Swanby as Hank

== Production ==
Shooting commenced in October 2011. Flight of the Storks was shot in South Africa, Istanbul and across Europe.
