= Dingaan Khumalo =

South African actor (born 1978)

Dingaan Mokebe Khumalo (born 26 January 1978) is a South African actor, TV presenter, voice artist as well as musician. He is well known for portraying the role of James Motsamai in SABC 2 drama, Muvhango.

== Early life ==
kaKhumalo was born on 26 January 1978 in Limpopo, South Africa. He was raised by his mother and stepfather. In 2016, he reconnected with his biological father, leading to a family reconciliation and the adoption of the name “ka Khumalo.”

== Career ==
KaKhumalo made his television debut in 1998 on the popular soap opera Generations, where he played the role of Dingaan, a barman. After leaving the show in 2002, he joined Muvhango in 2003, portraying James Motsamai before eventually departing from the series.

Beyond acting, KaKhumalo is a singer with songs such as Sondela and Mina Nawe, and as a voice artist for various major brands, including Smirnoff, Nedbank, Coca-Cola, and Kellogg's. He has also hosted several television programs, including Speak Out,Ha Moliefi, Zaziwa, and Community Builder, and appeared on reality shows such as Strictly Come Dancing and Nna Sajene Kokobela.

== Filmography ==
Year	Television	Role	Notes
1998	Generations	Dingaan	
	Ha Molefi		
2003-2025	Muvhango	James Motsamai	
	Speak Out	Host - Himself	
	Strictly Come Dancing	Himself	
	Zaziwa	Himself	
	Umoja		
