= Senzo Radebe =

South African actor

- Born: 29 May 1994 (age 31); Alexandra, Gauteng, South Africa
- Education: Alexandra High School
- Alma mater: Duma Ndlovu Actors Academy
- Occupations: Actor; Model; Personal trainer
- Years active: 2012–present

Senzokuhle Radebe (born 29 April 1993) is a South African actor best known for his supporting role as Sthembiso "Sthe" Gumede on the SABC2 soap opera Muvhango, Abednego on Isono, as well as his role as Zibuko on Gomora.

== Early life ==
Radebe has always been fascinated by the acting scene, however, it was only in Grade 10 that he made the decision to take dramatic arts as one of his subjects at school.

== Career ==
After auditioning for the role of Vusi (Thandaza Mokoena's son) on Muvhango, Radebe went through eight callbacks and didn't get the role, but got called back for a different character which was created specifically for him.

After finishing matric at Alexandra High School, he decided to attend Duma Ndlovu Academy at Joburg Theatre in enhancing acting skill since acting was his first love.

Radebe has made appearances and secured a lead role on SABC1's Ingozi and a recurring role on Mzansi Magic's Abomama Bomthandazo, which are the biggest highlights of his career. He planned to start a production company at a later stage.

== Filmography ==
Television
Year	Title	Role	Notes
2012–2016	Muvhango	Sthembiso Gumede	Supporting role
2015	Z'Bondiwe	Xolani	Supporting role
2017	Ingozi	Dali Ndamase	Lead role
2018	Abomama	Ghoroa	Recurring role
2018	Judge Thenjiwe Khambule	Case No. 2	Guest role
2018	Ring Of Lies	Scalp-crusher	Recurring role
2019	Ifalakhe	Butcher	Recurring role
2019	Grassroots	Phakama Zwane	Recurring role
2019	The Queen	Kop	Minor role
2020–2021/2022	Isono	Abednego Gumede	Supporting role
2022	Entangled	Reggie	Recurring role
2022	Gomora	Zibuko	Minor role
2023	Shaka Ilembe	King Senzangakhona kaJama	Lead role
2024–present	Isitha: The Enemy	Solomzi Gumede	Main role
