= Akhenime Mfenyana =

South African actress (born 1992)

- Born: Siyasanga Akhenime Mfenyana; 3 November 1992 (age 34); Johannesburg, Gauteng, South Africa
- Education: University of the Free State
- Occupations: Actress; influencer
- Years active: 2017–present
- Notable work: Gqeberha: The Empire
- Relatives: Zenande Mfenyana (sister)

Siyasanga Akhenime Mfenyana (born 3 November 1992) is a South African actress and influencer. She is best known for her lead role in Mzansi Magic telenovela Gqeberha: The Empire (2023–2024) as Anathi Mxenge. She is the co-founder of Girls With Gains organisation.

== Early life ==
Mfenyana was born Johannesburg, Gauteng, South Africa and raised in Komani, and she is the younger sister of Zenande Mfenyana. She attended Queenstown Girls High School and she obtained a Bachelor of Science in Behavioural Genetics degree from the University of the Free State. When she was young, she dreamed of becoming a doctor to heel people and dancing at ballet recitals.

== Career ==
Mfenyana made her television debut in Mzansi Magic soapie The Queen season 2 in 2017, playing the recurring role of Lucky widowed's wife. In 2020, she was in the Tropika Island of Treasure Curaçao paired with Simphiwe Ngema. The same year, she played playing the recurring role in Kings of Jo'Burg season 1. She made her film debut in Gog'Flo: The Protector playing the main role of Sophie. In early 2023, she played the lead role of Anathi Mxenge in Gqeberha: The Empire season 1–3. She took a little break from the telenovela and came back in early 2024. The same year, after returning, she left the show after it's seen to be controversial. In 2025, she played the supporting role of Lindiwe in Netflix series Bad Influencer, where she made her first credit in the Netflix. The Sowetan has reported that she want to gain more experience and waiting for more roles as she is currently in back stages.

=== Other activities ===
==== Girls With Gains Organization ====
Mfenyana co-founded Girls With Gains Organization that focuses on supporting and empowering girls through fitness and related initiatives.

== Filmography ==
=== Film ===
Year	Title	Role	Notes
2021	Gog'Flo: The Protector	Sophie	Main role

=== Television ===
Year	Title	Role	Notes
2017	The Queen	Lucky's wife	Recurring role
2020	Tropika Island of Treasure Curaçao	Herself	Paired with Simphiwe Ngema
2020	Kings of Jo'Burg	–	Recurring role
2023–2024	Gqeberha: The Empire	Anathi Mxenge	Lead role
2025	Bad Influencer	Lindiwe	Supporting role
