= The Two of Us (2014 film) =

2014 film directed by Ernest Nkosi

- Film poster
- Thina Sobabili: The Two of Us
- Directed by: Ernest Nkosi
- Written by: Ernest Nkosi; Mozzie Pheeha
- Produced by: Ernest Nkosi, Mozzie Pheeha, Enos Manthata, Mpho "Popps" Modikoane, Mpho Nthangeni
- Starring: Emmanuel Nkosinathi Gweva Busisiwe Mtshali Richard Lukunku Zikhona Sodlaka Mpho "Popps" Modikoane Thato Dhladla Thembi Nyandeni Hazel Mhlaba Kope Makgae
- Cinematography: Motheo Moeng
- Edited by: Warwick Allan
- Music by: Mpho Nthangeni
- Production company: The Monarchy Group
- Distributed by: The Monarchy Group (Africa - Times Media Films)
- Release dates: 19 July 2014 (Durban International Film Festival); 31 July 2015
- Running time: 94 minutes
- Country: South Africa
- Language: Zulu (English subtitles)

The Two of Us (originally Thina Sobabili: The Two of Us) is a 2014 drama film produced, written and directed by Ernest Nkosi. Set in Alexandra, Johannesburg the film tells a story of tough choices made by the youth living in the township neighborhood.

Independently funded by The Monarchy Group over a four-year period and filmed in a week, The Two of Us won the Audience Award at the 2015 Pan African Film Festival and won the same award seven days later at the Jozi Film Festival. On the weekend of its theatrical release, it won the Silverback Best Feature Film at the Rwanda Film Festival whilst ranking 8th as the only non-studio film in the top 10 at the South African box office.

The film was selected as the South African entry for the Best Foreign Language Film at the 88th Academy Awards but it was not nominated.

== Cast ==
- Emmanuel Nkosinathi Gweva as Thulani
- Busisiwe Mtshali as Zanele
- Richard Lukunku as Skhalo
- Zikhona Sodlaka as Zoleka
- Mpho "Popps" Modikoane as Mandla
- Thato Dhladla as Sbu
- Thembi Nyandeni as Gogo
- Hazel Mhlaba as Tumi
- Kope Makgae as Mr Finance

== Film Festival Awards ==
1. The Pan African Film Festival 2015 - Audience Award
2. Jozi Film Festival 2015 - Audience Award
3. Rwanda Film Festival 2015 - Silverback Best Feature Film

== See also ==
- List of submissions to the 88th Academy Awards for Best Foreign Language Film
- List of South African submissions for the Academy Award for Best Foreign Language Film
