= Pearl Modiadie =

South African actress and TV personality (born 1987)

Pearl Nokubonga Modiadie Mabunda
- Born: Nthabiseng Pearl Nokubonga Mabunda Modiadie; 29 December 1987 (age 38); Nkomazi, Nelspruit, South Africa
- Other names: The Black Pearl; Pearl Moody
- Education: Norkem Park High School; Rosebank College
- Occupations: TV personality; actress; television presenter; radio DJ; writer
- Years active: 2006–present
- Notable work: Expresso; Generations: The Legacy; Scandal!; SABC1; Trending SA; Zaziwa
- Children: Lewatle
- Website: pearlmodiadie.com

Pearl Modiadie (born 29 December 1987) is a South African television presenter, radio DJ, actress and producer best known to TV audiences for presenting the SABC1 music talk show Zaziwa.

== Life and career ==
=== 1987-2009: Early life and education ===
Pearl Modiadie was born in Xubeni section of Tembisa township in Ekurhuleni in the Gauteng province of South Africa.

Modiadie went to Norkem Park High School in Kempton Park in Ekurhuleni, Gauteng and matriculated in 2005. In 2007 she enrolled at Rosebank College to study a diploma in Media Studies and Journalism.

In 2009 Pearl Modiadie completed her diploma at Rosebank College.

=== Career ===
She was previously best known for presenting the e.tv kids programming block Craz-e. In 2007 she co-hosted the kids game show Crazed Out.

She was also a DJ at YFM and was the content producer for the Television Series Sistahood, which she also hosted until April 2012.

Early 2013 she made her debut on the e.tv soapie Scandal! as Kefilwe Malope, a feisty young girl with a track record of drug abuse and ulterior motives.

She later began hosting the SABC1 music lifestyle show Zaziwa, which gives viewers a chance to get to know their favourite celebrities through the music that has helped shape their lives.

She is a regular field presenter on SABC 3's breakfast show Expresso. She is also hosting at Metro FM alongside Thomas Msengane every weekday during 12pm-3pm.

In 2015 she was one of the 10 celebrity contestants on the eighth season of the South African reality competition series Strictly Come Dancing. She was partnered with professional dancer Grant Esterhuizen.

== Personal life ==
She gave a birth to a baby boy named Lewatle Olivier in September 2020. Modiadie has two sisters Dambuza Sina Sibuyi (45) and Tebogo Penelope Modiadie (25). She has one niece and two nephews named Naledi Gugulethu Mkhonto (17), Nkateko Lesedi Mkhonto (5), and Oratile Percy Modiadie (5).

== Filmography ==
Film
Year	Film	Role	Notes
2006–2013	Craz-e	Herself	Presenter, Soap opera
2022	Redemption	Yvonne Zikode	Lead character
2013–present	Zaziwa	Herself	Host
2013– 2015	Expresso	Herself	Field presenter
2013–present	Generations	Jade	Recurring role
2014	Kasi To Favelas	Herself	Host
2014	Come Duze 2015	Herself	Host
2015	14th Metro FM Music Awards	Herself	Social media lounge host
2017–present	Raw Silk	Herself	host
2018–2019	Trending SA	Herself	Guest host
