= Chioma Umeala =

South African-Nigerian actress (born 1996)

- Born: 17 July 1996 (age 30); Johannesburg, South Africa
- Education: AFDA, The School for the Creative Economy; Indigo View Advanced Actors Academy,
- Occupation: Actress
- Years active: 2017-

Chioma Antoinette Umeala (born 17 July 1996) is a South African-Nigerian actress and model. She is known for her roles in Isono: The Sin (2020), The Woman King (2022), and One Piece (2023).

== Biography ==
Umeala was born on 17 July 1996. She has a Nigerian father and South African mother, and is of Xhosa and Igbo heritage. She is based in Johannesburg, South Africa.

Umeala studied acting at AFDA, The School for the Creative Economy and the Indigo View Advanced Actors Academy in South Africa. She attended audition technique classes with held by the South African Guild of Actors (SAGA). She worked as an assistant to the executive producer on The Real Housewives of Johannesburg (RHOJ).

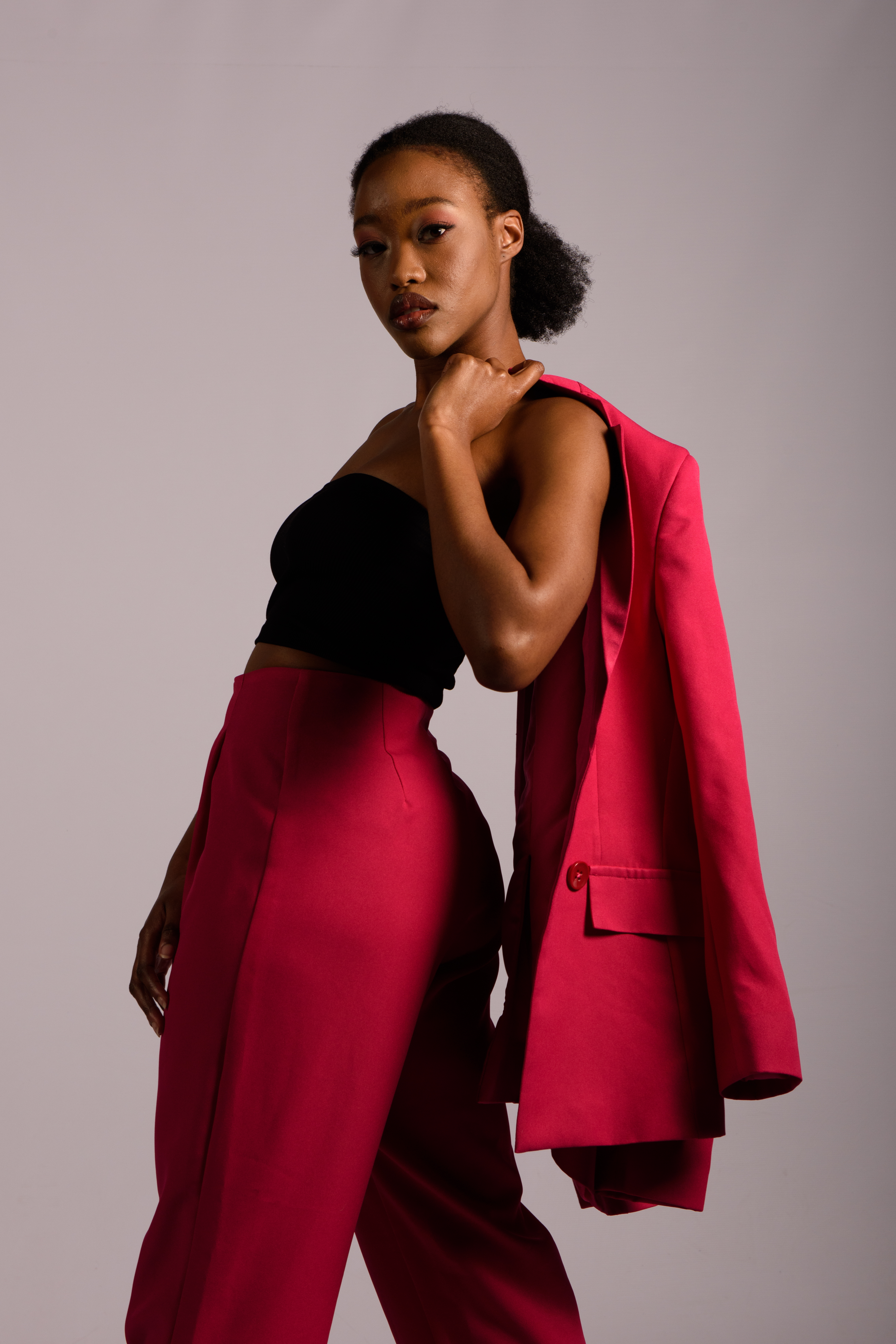
Umeala in 2020

Umeala made her film debut on the student film Look Closer (2017). She made her stage debut at Joburg Theatre in the production Scene (2018).

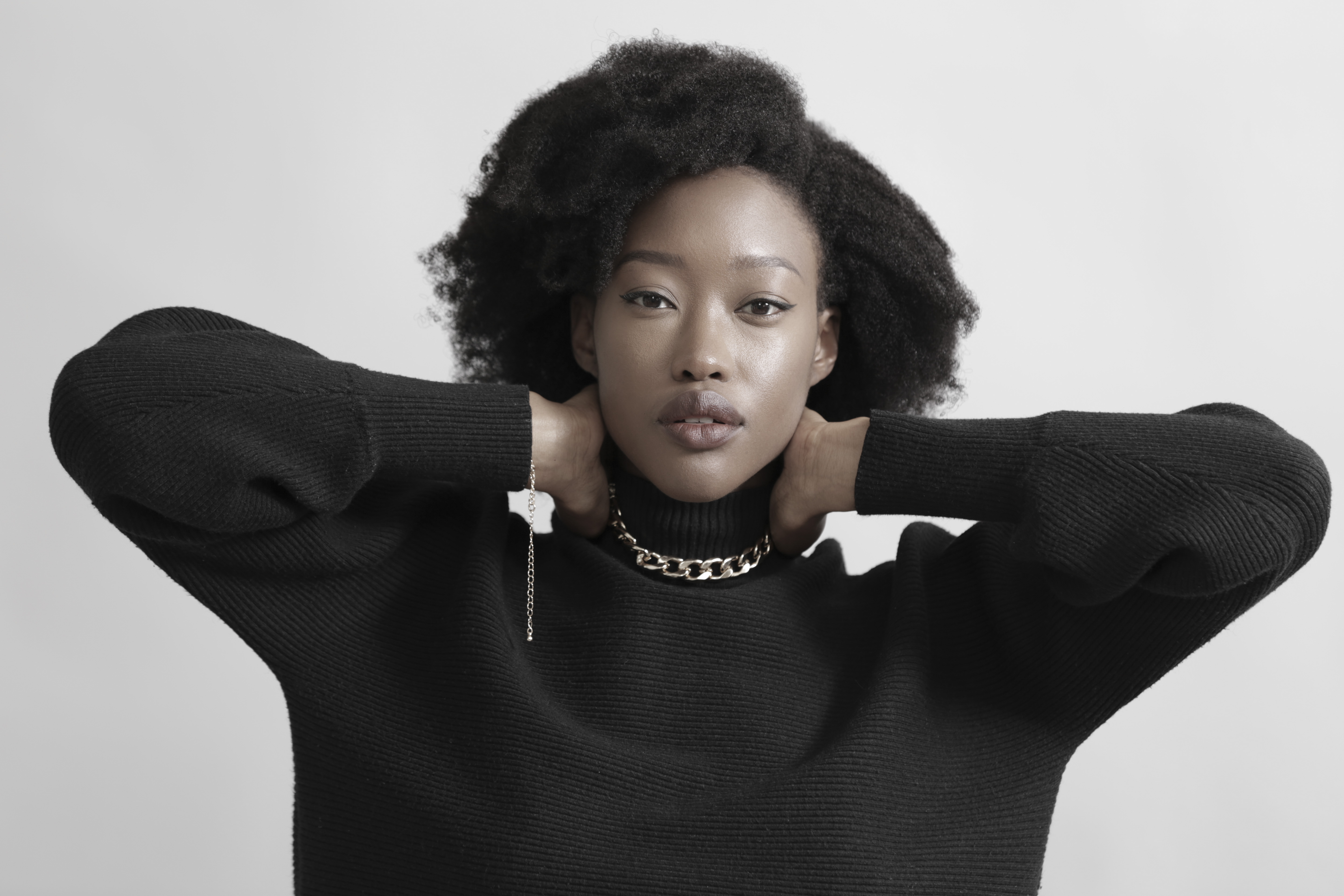
Umeala in 2021

Umeala played medical student Ayo Demi in 19 episodes of BET Africa's multilingual scripted and English subtitled daily drama series Isono (2020); her breakout role. In 2020, she also featured in the music video for South African rapper AKA's "Caiphus Song" as a bridesmaid. In 2021 she was photographed for Vogue Italia.

Umeala played Tara in The Woman King (2022). She had a supporting role in The First Last Tour.

Umeala played Nojiko, the adoptive sister of Nami (played by Emily Rudd), in Netflix's live-action series One Piece (2023). The character was originally Japanese in the comics and Umeala had advocated for black representation in anime. She has spoken at Comic Con panels and on the One Piece podcast about her role in the show.

In 2025, Umeala starred in Novocaine (2025). She has collaborated with Starbucks South Africa and appeared in commercials for MTC Namibia and Dark and Lovely.
