= Shashi Naidoo =

South African actress and television presenter

- Born: 4 November 1980 (age 45); Port Elizabeth
- Education: University of Johannesburg
- Occupations: actress, television presenter, model.

Shashi Naidoo (born 4 November 1980) is a South African actress, television presenter, model, MC, entrepreneur, and fashion blogger. She is best known for co-hosting the E.TV magazine show 20 Something. During this time, she also co-hosted the nationwide MTV VJ Search.

== Early life ==
Naidoo was born and raised in Port Elizabeth and graduated from Alexander Road High School in 1997. She moved to Johannesburg to study chiropractic medicine, which she completed in 2007 at the University of Johannesburg.

== Career ==
Naidoo entered the public eye in 2004 when she played Ziggy's girlfriend Linda McGinty in the E.TV soapie Backstage. Soon after, she had a brief role in the SABC1 soapie Generations. She also appeared in a minor role in the 2007 mini-series Society. She began co-presenting the youth magazine show EMS Volume 1 on SABC1 on 2 October 2007.

Naidoo completed a six-month stint on the MNET soapie Egoli in 2008, playing the role of Sureshni Patel. She has partaken in a plethora of TV and Print commercials as a model and brand ambassador for: Sun International (with Charlize Theron), Woolworths (With Alek Wek), Coke Zero International, MTN, Nivea, Brutal Fruit, Jet, Edgars, Rama, Discovery, IEC SA, Samsung, Malaysian Airways, SA Tourism, DSTV India, Blow the Whistle Campaign, Dermalogica Skin Care, Jose Cuervo, SPAR Gsport Awards Ambassador and many more.

In 2008, Naidoo was featured in the FHM calendar 2008, voted number 14 in FHM's 100 sexiest women in the world, and fourth in 2009. She was the Cosmopolitan September 2008 cover girl and appeared in the 2009 Sports Illustrated. She was also one of the leading personalities in Woolworth's campaigns for 2008 and 2009.

She went on to win the coveted January 2009 cover of Playboy (and February 2010), which showcases the calendar for 2009, where she also presented the Calendar Television show for Mnet, which was shot on location in Zanzibar.

Naidoo has been an MC (Master of Ceremonies) during events for Shoprite Checkers Annual Suppliers Awards, International Mohair Summit, The Financial Forum, FNB HR Recognition Awards, VW Recognition Awards, Audi Award Dinner, and the 5th Annual Women in Engineering Convention. She also presented awards at the SAMA Awards, YOU Spectacular, and Glamour SA Most Glamorous. Her accolades include Glamour Model of the Year, Feather Awards Hot Chick; Take Control Youth Adult Achiever of the Year, Gsport Style Star of the Year, AND Grazia Magazine Top 5 Most Stylish. Naidoo is the sole owner of a modeling agency, Alushi Management. The agency started off with 5 models in 2008 and now represents over 400 models and celebrities.

Currently, Shashi Naidoo is a co-host on South Africa's TV show Tongue in Cheek on SABC 3; Naidoo is also a Brand Ambassador for Demalogica, Diva Divine Hair, Cotlands Children's Home, Tumi Luxury Travel Bags, Glam Palm hair straightener. Recently, SHE has become one of the founding members of Fashion with Feeling. This is the first major non-profit organization in the fashion industry and has been established to inspire and empower individuals interested in the fashion industry, with a bias towards teenagers and young adults who are often overlooked.

In June 2018, Naidoo posted a defense of Israel's policy toward Hamas in the Gaza Strip on her Instagram account. Naidoo called Gaza a "shithole" and criticized Hamas for pursuing an "ambition to annihilate Israel." The post sparked outrage in South African media. Several of Naidoo's sponsors cut their ties with Naidoo due to the backlash. After receiving death threats from advocates for an anti-Israel boycott, Naidoo apologized, retracted her comments, and deleted her Instagram post. Later, she appeared at a news conference with members of the South African BDS movement and apologized again. Israel barred her entry to join a program sponsored by the South African Council of Churches and the South African Jews for a Free Palestine.

== Personal life ==
Naidoo is a Hindu by religion. She dated reality TV contestant Ismail Hendricks, who appeared on the show The Apprentice South Africa in 2005. She married Mark Sandler in December 2009 but divorced in 2011.

In 2009, she was the second-season celebrity winner of Tropika Island of Treasure.
