= NaakMusiQ =

South African actor, model and musician (born 1987)

Anga Makubalo
- Born: Anga Makubalo; 28 May 1987 (age 38); Port Elizabeth (now Gqeberha), South Africa
- Other names: NaakMusiQ
- Education: Damelin
- Occupations: Actor; singer; model; DJ
- Years active: 2009–present
- Children: Mlisela, Milani, Abha and Amira
- Parent(s): Nomvula Tsotsi (mother); Musi Qaqambile (father)

Anga Makubalo (born 28 May 1987), known professionally as NaakMusiQ, is a South African actor, singer, model, and DJ. He is best known for his acting roles as MJ Memela in the SABC 1 soap opera Generations, Obakeng in Isidingo, and Mzolisi Nobengela in The Estate. In 2022, he gained significant media attention for winning a celebrity boxing match against rapper Cassper Nyovest.

== Early life and education ==
Makubalo was born in Gqeberha, South Africa, to Nomvula Tsotsi and Musi Qaqambile. He has a brother, Khanyiso, and a sister, Asanda. His stage name, NaakMusiQ, is an acronym derived from his family's names: N for his mother Nomvula, A for his sister Asanda, the second A for Anga himself, and K for his brother Khanyiso. The "MusiQ" part of the name is a tribute to his father, Musi.

He attended Edenvale High School before enrolling at Talent International, where he studied presenting and acting, and later served as a part-time mentor. He later studied contemporary music at Damelin college in Bramley.

== Career ==
=== Music ===
Makubalo began his music career with Baainar Records before joining the record label Afrotainment in 2015. He has collaborated with numerous prominent South African artists, including Black Coffee, DJ Tira, Heavy K, DJ Fresh, and Euphonik.

In 2024, Makubalo and DJ Tira publicly reconciled after a four-year feud reportedly stemming from a dispute over ringtone revenues. Following their reconciliation, they announced they were working on new music together.

In 2023, he officially launched his career as a DJ, expanding his portfolio within the entertainment industry. He has continued to release music, including the 2023 EP October 22 and several singles in 2024 such as "Sthandwa Sami" and "iMvula".

=== Acting ===
Makubalo's breakthrough acting role was as Bandile "MJ" Memela in the SABC 1 soap opera Generations, a role he played from 2011 to 2014. He has since appeared in several other major television productions, including Isidingo, Z'bondiwe, and Igazi. In 2022, he joined the cast of the SABC telenovela The Estate for its third season, playing the role of Mzolisi Nobengela.

=== Celebrity boxing ===
On 9 April 2022, Makubalo defeated rapper Cassper Nyovest in the "Celeb City" celebrity exhibition boxing match held at the Sun City Superbowl. The event was highly publicized and sold out within two hours. Makubalo accepted Nyovest's challenge despite having no prior boxing experience. He later revealed that he had suffered a chest infection six weeks before the fight but chose to proceed with the match.

== Personal life ==
In 2013, Makubalo was named one of the "Top 6 of Sowetan's Mzansi's Sexiest" celebrities. He has expressed intentions to use his entertainment career as a foundation for future business and entrepreneurial ventures.

In 2023, his former fiancée, Roselyn April, made public accusations regarding child support. He has 2 sons and 2 daughters. According to reports, Makubalo declined to comment on the matter, stating a preference to keep his personal life private.

== Filmography ==
Year	Title	Role	Genre	Network	Notes
2011–2014	Generations	Bandile "MJ" Memela	Soap opera	SABC 1	Lead role
2013	Zaziwa	Himself	Talk show	SABC 1	Special guest
2015–2016	Z'bondiwe	Ntando Mabatha	TV series	e.tv	Lead role
2018	Broken Vows	Chulu	TV series	—	—
2020 - 2021	Isono	Makwande Mabongo	TV series		
2021	Jiva!	DJ Sika	TV series		
2022	The Estate	Mzolisi Nobengela	Telenovela	SABC 1	Main role (Season 3)
2022	Tropika Island of Treasure	Host	Game show	SABC 3	Presenter
—	Come Duze	Performing artist	New Year's Eve musical special	SABC 1	Guest
—	Igazi	Bantu	TV series	Mzansi Magic	Lead role
—	Isidingo	Obakeng	TV series	SABC 3	Supporting role
—	Isithembiso	Lucky	TV series	Mzansi Magic	—
—	Isono: The Sin	Makwande Mabongo	TV series	BET, e.tv	Lead role
—	Ring of Lies	Buzwe	TV series	Mzansi Magic	—
—	Tropika Island of Treasure	Contestant	Game show	SABC 3	Guest
