= Isono (TV series) =

South African TV crime drama

- Genre: Crime; Thriller
- Created by: Mahlohonolo Manchester Mahapa
- Based on: Drug Business
- Starring: Nthati Moshesh; Bohang Moeko; Moshidi Motshegwa; Rami Chuene; Senzo Radebe; Didintle Khunou; TK Sebothoma; Anga Makubalo; Chamaine Mntita; Natasha Tahane
- Country of origin: South Africa
- No. of seasons: 1

Original release
- Network: BET Africa
- Release: 28 September 2020 – 21 December 2021

Isono was a South African television drama series created by Mahlogonolo Manchester Mahapa. It is BET Africa's first original drama series produced by Clive Morris Productions for BET Africa. It stars Nthati Moshesh, Bohang Moeko, Senzo Radebe and Anga Makhubalo. In 2022 the show moved to e.tv after the cancellation that took place in December 2021.

== Plot ==
Set in the township of Vosloorus, the series focuses on Gabriel (Bohang Moeko), a heroic son born into a dysfunctional family, who finds strength within him to stand up against Mary Ndlovu ( Nthati Moshesh), a powerful and evil matriarch who would do anything to serve her own needs.

Mary pretends to be a philanthropic socialite who takes in delinquent children and cares for them in House of Grace, a centre for "at risk" youth in Vosloorus on the East Rand of Johannesburg.

Unknown to the public eye, she is a cold-hearted criminal who runs an illegal child trafficking and adoption ring.

Gabriel, who works alongside Mary, wants to leave behind his life of crime and turn a new leaf, however Mary drags her back into his dark past. The return of an old friend brings chaos to Gabriel's life.

== Main cast ==
| Actor | Role |
|---|---|
| Nthati Moshesh | Mary Ndlovu |
| Bohang Moeko | Gabriel Ndlovu |
| Moshidi Motshegwa | Sarah Mretuwa |
| Rami Chuene | Jumima Ndlovu |
| Senzo Radebe | Abednego "AB" Gumede |
| TK Sebothoma | Simon Ndlovu |
| Didintle Khunou | Esther Ndlovu |
| Anga Makhubalo | Makwande Mabongo |
| Chamaine Mtinta | Mam' Lili |
| Natasha Thahane | Millicent Zondo |
| Zola Nombona | Zoleka |

== Cast and characters ==
- Nthati Moshesh as Mary Ndlovu

Affectionately known as Mother Mary, she is a philanthropic socialite who takes in homeless children and cares for them at the House of Grace, a centre for "at-risk" youth in Vosloorus on the East Rand of Johannesburg.Unknown to the public eye however, she runs an illegal adoption ring. Although she is a staunch believer in Christ, she launders money through the church, along with other illicit deals. Mary is running from her dark past, which she believes is safely buried.

- Bohang Moeko as Gabriel Ndlovu

Mary's adopted son and right-hand general. He is resourceful, damaged and brooding. In the beginning of the series, he is facing a crisis of conscience. He secretly wants to leave his life of crime and become a force for good. He feels that he needs to move away from the toxic nature of his home. However, her mother's powerful grip keeps pulling him back, making it difficult to leave the dark side of his life.

- Senzo Radebe as Abednego "AB" Gumede

Abenego was a former House of Grace child at age 10 due to his troubled home background, raised by Mary alongside Gabriel and Esther. At age 15 he ran away from the home after being caught in a physical romance with a young Gabriel ten years ago, living in the streets until he joined Gazati's gang. A violent and amoral man who returns into the world of Mary and her children. His return gives Mary the opportunity to infiltrate the network of a rival criminal, using him and Gabriel as foot-soldiers.

- Didintle Khunou as Esther Ndlovu

Mary's musically talented and idolized daughter. Esther attended boarding school when she was young, thus she grew up sheltered and away from her family. She has dedicated her life to pleasing her mother. She seeks external validation from others to affirm her place in life. Her fear of failure and insecurities are made clear in the series. She becomes a drug and alcohol addict and ruins every opportunity coming her way. This not only affects her performance but also her once-promising career in music.

- Rami Chuene as Jumima

An odd and eccentric chacacter. She roams around the streets of Vosloorus making money by selling things. A gossipmonger who often gets the wrong end of the stick by making odd connections and pronouncements. She lives at the House of Grace. She shares a dark past with Mary.

- Chioma Umeala as Ayo

Pastor Abiola and Titi's headstrong daughter. She is a rebel who constantly challenges her parents, especially when it comes to Abiola's reliance on faith to heal all ills. She is also romantically involved with Gabriel Ndlovu.
