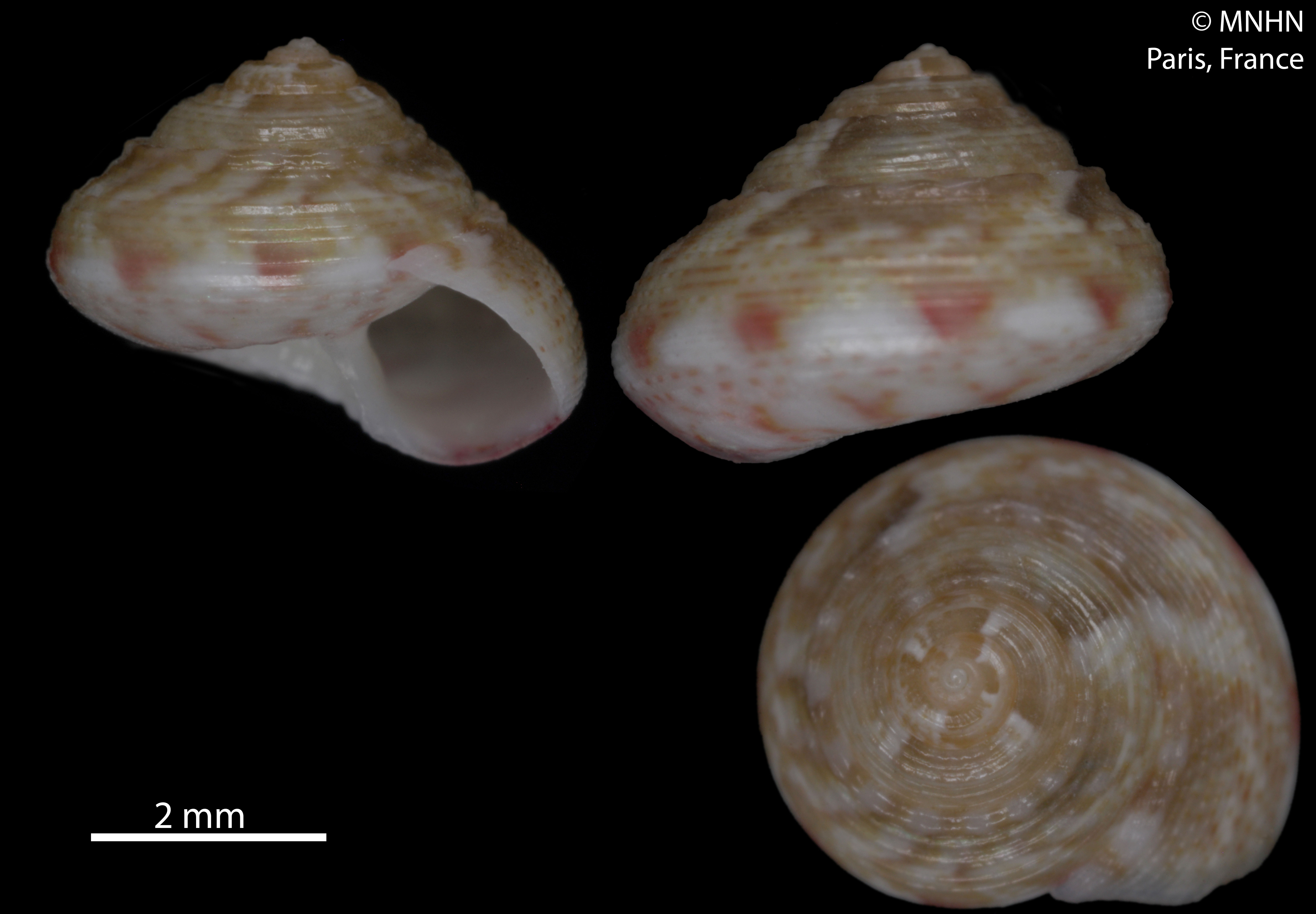
- Shell of Inkaba tonga (paratype at MNHN, Paris)

Scientific classification
- Kingdom: Animalia
- Phylum: Mollusca
- Class: Gastropoda
- Subclass: Vetigastropoda
- Order: Trochida
- Superfamily: Trochoidea
- Family: Trochidae
- Genus: Inkaba
- Species: I. tonga

Binomial name
- Inkaba tonga Herbert, 1992

Synonyms
- Inkaba (Clanculus) tonga Herbert, 1992

= Inkaba tonga =

Species of gastropod

Inkaba tonga is a species of sea snail, a marine gastropod mollusk in the family Trochidae, the top snails.

== Distribution ==
This species occurs in the Indian Ocean off Mozambique.
