= Kedibone =

2020 South African drama film

- Release poster
- Directed by: Thomas Gumede
- Written by: Zaba LeRoto Hlatshwayo
- Produced by: Andrew Mahlangu; Hardy Maoto
- Starring: Natasha Thahane; Wright Ngubeni; Kenneth Nkosi; Matli Mohapeloa; Thabo Malema
- Cinematography: Lance Gewer
- Edited by: Mangaliso Nkosi
- Music by: Karabo Khumalo
- Production companies: Shack Pictures; Smatsatsa Communication
- Distributed by: Indigenous Film Distribution; Netflix
- Release date: September 11, 2020
- Running time: 94 minutes
- Country: South Africa
- Languages: Zulu language; English

Kedibone is a 2020 South African drama film co-written and directed by Thomas Gumede. The film stars Natasha Thahane in the titular role and explores the challenges faced by a young woman from Orlando East, Soweto who becomes entangled in Johannesburg's entertainment and social scenes while trying to maintain her relationship and identity.

The film also features an ensemble cast of Kenneth Nkosi, Matli Mohapeloa, Thabo Malema, Busisiwe Mtshali, Tessa Twala, Thami Mngqolo, Kwezi Ndlovu, and Muntu Zwane.

Kedibone premiered at the Durban International Film Festival on September 11, 2020, and was released in the South Africa on November 27, 2020 at the Africa Rising International Film Festival. It was released on Netflix on May 27, 2022. This release date was confirmed by Netflix South Africa through their official Facebook page.

== Plot ==
Kedibone Manemala, a young lady from Orlando East, Soweto, is a graduate of secondary school and is looking forward to getting into a university in the town. Unfortunately, her plans are jeopardised upon realisation that her aunt, Maguata, who is supposed to provide for her tuition fees and who she stays with, is of the opinion that she should be working in a supermarket rather than joining such an expensive institution. Maguata spends all the money she had saved for Kedibone in a Ponzi scheme known as Hope of Glory. Instead, she asks Kedibone to join her in working in a retail chain, Checkers. With just a few days remaining before the academic year starts, Kedibone has to urgently look for another way to finance her studies.

Kedibone's long-time boyfriend, Mrembula, sells his second-hand BMW car he inherited from his deceased father for 25,000 ZAR. Kedibone loans 5,000 ZAR to her best friend, Gheminah, who is pregnant but wishes to enrol in the university.

On arrival at the university, Kedibone and Gheminah face difficulties adapting to their new environment. The university cannot accommodate them in its halls of residence, but provides them with a room occupied by an eccentric acting professor. They also get familiar with a bunch of popular college students, among whom is Tanya. She praises Kedibone's haircut and is interested in her.

Away from her native environment, Kedibone falls under the influence of the glamour and sophistication of an urban life. While keeping her values in mind, one of them being the decision to retain chastity before marriage, Kedibone becomes torn apart. To become financially independent, Kedibone starts working in different places, where, through one job, she gets involved in a drug-using party. As a result, she becomes the subject of reckless decisions. On the other hand, Mrembula remains in Soweto and works twice as hard in anticipation of their bright future without knowing about his double-life girlfriend whose adventures bring him just a little benefit.

Gheminah feels uncomfortable because of the courtship of her by Tanya's rich father in the form of expensive presents and cash. As Kedibone becomes more and more entangled in her ambiguous relationships, she draws the attention of Tanya's father. Msithi, Mrembula's best friend, discovers Kedibone's secret affairs with Tanya's father, "the pimp daddy".

== Cast ==
- Natasha Thahane as Kedibone Manamela
- Wright Ngubeni as Mrembula
- Kenneth Nkosi as Franco
- Matli Mohapeloa as Dexter
- Thabo Malema as Msithi
- Busisiwe Mtshali as Geminah
- Tessa Twala as Tanya
- Thami Mngqolo as Smash
- Kwezi Ndlovu as Amanda
- Unathi Guma as Magauti
- Melvinah Eheli as Pebbles
- Sivenathi Mabuya as Niki
- Keke Mphuti as Madam
- Tshego Koke as Mingus
- Muntu Zwane as Brad

== Production ==
In October 2018, actress Natasha Thahane shared a photo of herself beside a camera on what appeared to be a film set, without revealing details. The project was later identified as Kedibone, The film was directed by Thomas Gumede. The film stars Natasha Thahane as Kedibone, with Kenneth Nkosi among the supporting cast. Casting was handled by Nolwazi Shange. Filming took place in Gauteng, South Africa, mainly in Soweto, Bryanston and Auckland Park. With cinematography by Lance Gewer.

== Release ==
Kedibone was distributed domestically by Indigenous Film Distribution, while international distribution was managed by Netflix. The film was initially scheduled for release on September 11, 2020, coinciding with its premiere at the Durban International Film Festival. It later became available for streaming on Netflix on May 27, 2022, a date confirmed by Netflix South Africa via its official Facebook page.

== Critical reception ==
Pooja Sharma of LeisureByte described the film as a "visually stunning" coming-of-age story that authentically captures the essence of South African culture. She praised the film's exploration of themes such as identity, ambition, and the complexities of personal choices, and commended the cast's performances, particularly Natasha Thahane’s portrayal of the titular character. Riya Singh of Midgard Times called Kedibone a "must-watch," highlighting its strong acting, engaging plot, and impressive cinematography. Although she noted that the ending was somewhat confusing, Singh acknowledged the film's effectiveness in portraying the challenges faced by young women pursuing fame and success, emphasizing its cultural relevance. Vivian Nneka Nwajiaku of Afrocritik described Kedibone as a compelling coming-of-age story with a well-developed plot. She praised Thomas Gumede's direction, the film's score, and Lance Gewer's cinematography but criticized the ending for using rape as a plot device. She gave the film a rating of 3.5 out of 5.

Retrospective

According to Thango Ntwasa of SowetanLIVE, the film misrepresents young Black women, arguing that it perpetuates stereotypes rather than offering a nuanced portrayal.
