= Chichi Letswalo =

South African television actress and presenter

- Born: Tebogo Chichi Letswalo; 14 September 1981 (age 45); Alexandra, South Africa
- Education: Wendywood High School; Akademie vir Dramakuns; Michael Howard School
- Occupations: Television actress and presenter
- Years active: 2003–present

Tebogo Chichi Letswalo (born 14 September 1981), is a South African television actress and presenter. She is best known for the roles in the television serials; Generations, Isithembiso and Lingashoni.

== Personal life ==
Letswalo was born on 14 September 1981 in Alexandra, Gauteng, a township outside Johannesburg, South Africa as the eldest in a family with three siblings. She was educated at Wendywood High School, and subsequently attended the Akademie vir Dramakuns for two years.

During an interview, she said that she wants to live alone, without a husband and kids.

== Career ==
She was selected as a presenter during the SABC3 reality programme The Wedding Show held in the Rosebank Mall in Johannesburg in 2003. She co-presented the show with Ed Jordan. In 2007, she moved to New York and studied performing arts at the Michael Howard School of Film, Theatre and Television. After five years of life in the US, she returned to South Africa in 2012. She also presented promotion programmes such as Ciao Cocktails and Handy Andy Homemaker show.

In 2014, she made television acting debut with the soapie Generations and played the role "Zandi Mbisi". Then she made minor roles in many soap operas such as e.tv. drama Backstage, the SABC1 drama Tshisa. In 2013, she joined with the show Zaziwa. In 2017, she joined with the recurring cast of the Mzansi Magic television soapie Isithembiso where she played the role "Claudia Kunene" in first two seasons. Then in 2019, she played the role of "Dipuo Lesolle" in the serial Grassroots. In 2021, she joined with first season of the serial Lingashoni to play the role of "Mrs Mkhize".

== Filmography ==
Year	Film	Role	Genre	Ref.
1994	Generations	Zandi Mbisi	TV series	
2006	Tshisa	Bonnie Nkomo	TV series	
2013	Zaziwa	Herself	TV series	
2017	Isithembiso	Claudia Kunene	TV series	
2019	Grassroots	Dipuo Lesolle	TV series	
2021	Lingashoni	Mrs Mkhize	TV series	
