= Lebo Motsoeli =

South African actress and television presenter

- Born: Lebohang Motsoeli; Gauteng, South Africa
- Occupations: Television presenter, Actress, MC, Voice-over artist, Scriptwriter, Producer
- Years active: 2003–present
- Spouse: Sizwe Mabena (m. 2012; div. 2013)

Lebohang Motsoeli is a South African television presenter, actress, MC, voice-over artist, scriptwriter and producer. One of the most popular woman sports commentators in South Africa, she has performed in many local and international sport events such as; "Special Olympics", "International Paralympic World Athletics Champions" and "All Africa Games".

== Personal life ==
She excelled hockey and later represented Gauteng hockey team for three years. She has graduated with a degree in communications science.

In 2012, she married the fellow sports commentator, Sizwe Mabena. But they divorced in 2013, less than one year.

== Career ==
In 2003, she started sport broadcasting. In 2004, she joined with SABC as a presenter and hosted Sport On 2 with Tshepo Mabona. Then she worked as an anchor for SABC3 Sport and SABC1 Sport where she presented the popular sports programs such as; Above the Bar, Hockistix, Spike and Sportsbuzz. Apart from sports, she also presented the programs such as; Glory Hallelujah, Coca Cola Game show, "Sunsilk Launch" and Crazy Games. Meanwhile in 2004, she made her acting debut with the television soap opera Yizo Yizo by playing the minor role as "Prostitute". In 2005, she got the opportunity to make her first international reporting for SABC sport, when she went to Brazil for the International Wheelchair and Amputee Sports Federation World Games (IWAS Games).

At the same time, she started to work as a voice over artist and scriptwriter for the youth program Sportsbuzz. Then she became the first woman to host the first woman-dedicated sport program titled Women in Sport. In 2006 Motsoeli joined as a live television and radio reporter for the International Paralympic World Athletics Champions held in Amsterdam. In 2006, she won the SAB Newcomer of the Year Merit award and later recognized as the 2007 January Woman in Media by Gsport. In 2007, he went to the Special Olympics as a reporter. In the same year, she became famous when she hosting the "All Africa Games" in Nigeria. After that, she presented the programs Amakrokokroko, Pedal Talk, and FNB African Soccer Show. Meanwhile, she featured in the "Siyanqoba 2010 Campaign". In 2010, she joined with the cast of popular soapie Generations and played the role "Zodwa".

Apart from that, she also worked as the Lifestyle and Fashion Editor for Soccerlife magazine. In the meantime, she hosted the South Africa Sport Awards, South Africa Boxing awards, as well as the National Women's Day at the Union Buildings. In radio, she joined with Metro FM as a sports broadcaster, where she hosted the show called Ladies Club. On 10 June 2008, she started to co-host the SABC1 magazine show called Countdown 2010 with Fezile Makhanya and Eugene Khoza, as a preparatory work for the 2010 Soccer World Cup. In 2013, she hosted the program Soccer 411 on SABC1 and reality soccer search Nedbank Ke Yona. In August 2020, Motsoeli was nominated for Radio 2000 sports caster, and Woman in Radio category at the Momentum gsport Awards.

== Filmography ==
Year	Film	Role	Genre	Ref.
2004	Yizo Yizo	Prostitute	TV series	
2010	Generations	Zodwa	TV series	
2014	Zaziwa	Herself	TV series	
