= Sinazo Yolwa =

South African actress, model and presenter

- Born: Sinazo Pelisa Yolwa; 26 July 1988 (age 37); Eastern Cape, South Africa
- Education: Sea Point High
- Alma mater: University of Cape Town
- Occupation(s): Model, Actress, MC, Television presenter
- Years active: 2010–present

Sinazo Pelisa Yolwa (born 26 July 1988), is a South African model, actress, MC and television presenter. She is best known for the roles in the serials Impilo, The Wild, Single Guyz and worked as a presenter in many international fashion and lifestyle campaigns.

== Personal life ==
Yolwa was born on 26 July 1988 in Eastern Cape, South Africa. She was raised by her mother. After finishing high school, she moved to Cape Town in 2004. Then she had a tough life in Khayelitsha for a few months but later found a flat in Green Point. After that, she matriculated from Sea Point High in 2006 with two distinctions for English and Afrikaans. For her excellence, she won the Stephen Young Scholarship. In 2007, she entered University of Cape Town (UCT) to study Bcomm. in Accounting and finally graduated in 2010. In 2009 she won the UCT Association of Black Alumni bursary.

== Career ==
After graduation, she featured in many television commercials for Vodacom, Sasol, Ackerman's and Brut. In 2010, she made her first television presenting by hosting the SABC3 entertainment variety program The A List. In 2011, she made television acting debut with M-Net television serial The Wild where she played the supportive role "Victoria". After that success, she joined with PEP's radio drama series, Impilo with the role of "Sindi". In 2011, she worked as the presenter of the Tshwane TV environmental show Water is Life. In November 2011, she joined with the SABC3 magazine show Top Billing as a part-time presenter. Meanwhile, she joined with the final season of the show Real Goboza, which was continued to 14 consecutive years.

Then in 2012, she became the entertainment correspondent for the SABC1 lifestyle magazine program The Link. In the same year, she was the presenter of the show The Link and online video site Zoopy. In 2013, she rendered her voice to SABC1 reality competition So You Think You Can Dance season 3. In November of the same year, she replaced Pearl Thusi on the SABC1 entertainment show The Real Goboza. In the meantime, she acted in the television serial Single Guyz by playing the role "Sibahle".

== Filmography ==
Year	Film	Role	Genre	Ref.
2011	The Wild	Victoria	TV series	
2013	Single Guyz	Sibahle	TV series	
2014	Zaziwa	Herself	TV series	
2024	Gqeberha: The Empire	Yoliswa Grootboom		TV series
