= Aaron Moloisi =

South African actor and presenter (born 1979)

- Born: Aaron Moloisi; 13 May 1979 (age 47); Limpopo, South Africa
- Education: Fort Hare University
- Occupations: Actor, Television presenter
- Years active: 2002–present
- Known for: Acting
- Spouse: Inno matijane

Aaron Moloisi (born 13 May 1979), is a South African actor and television presenter. He is best known for his presenting on SABC2's discussion show The Big Question and role of "Hector Mogale" in the SABC1 mini-series After Nine.

== Personal life ==
Moloisi was born on 13 May 1979 in Ga-Dikgale in Limpopo, South Africa. After matriculation, he completed his BSC in Chemistry and Microbiology from the Fort Hare University from 1996 to 1999. After graduation, he worked for Computer Configurations Holdings as an Oracle Database Developer from January 2000 to January 2002. Later in January 2002, he Joined with Liberty Group South Africa as an Oracle Database Management Systems Developer until February 2003.

He is homosexual and dated to fellow actor Innocent Matijane.

== Career ==
In 2002, he joined with SABC1 television network as a television presenter. Then he presented the program Take 5. In the same year, he was invited to join the SABC2 program The Big Question as a field reporter. The show became very popular, where he presented it until 2006. In 2007, he made maiden acting with the mini-series After Nine telecast on SABC1, where he played the lead role of "Hector Mogale". After that success, he joined the team of Shift in 2008. Since 2008, he is working as the presenter on the SABC Education talk show called Shift. In 2013, he became the host of the SABC1 reality competition Rize Mzansi.

In 2016, he made the supportive role of "Rwabushenyi Official" in the American biographical drama feature film Queen of Katwe directed by Mira Nair.

== Filmography ==
Year	Film	Role	Genre	Ref.
2007	After 9	Hector Mogale	TV series	
2009	Generations	Will Hlatswayo	TV series	
2014	Skeem Saam	Prosecutor	TV series	
2016	Queen of Katwe	Rwabushenyi Official	Film	
2017	The Queen	Madimetja	TV series	
2020	Zaziwa	Himself	TV series	
