= Gqeberha: The Empire =

South African TV drama

- Genre: Telenovela; Drama
- Created by: Phathutshedzo Makwarela
- Starring: Zandile Msutwana; Bongile Mantsai; Anele Matoti; Unathi Guma; Kamvelihle Bikitsha; Akhenime Mfenyana; Tembinkosi Ngcukana; Oros Mampofu; Siziphiwe Maqubeka; Lonalinamandla Bawuti; Lilanga Soginga; Asipezi Jita; Likhey Booi; Ayanda Makayi; Zinzi Nsele; Rorisang Mohapi; Asamkele Ngunuza; Gladstone Mali

Production
- Running time: 22–26 minutes

Original release
- Release: 16 January 2023 – 10 January 2025

Related
- The Queen

Gqeberha: The Empire is a South African television series that replaced the telenovela series The Queen on Mzansi Magic. The show is set in Gqeberha (formerly Port Elizabeth) and follows the lives of a powerful family, the Mxenges, as they navigate love, power and betrayal. It first aired on the 16 January 2023 and 260 episodes per season are broadcast. The show is produced by multi-award winning production house, Tshedza Pictures. Tshedza Pictures has produced shows like The River Season 1 to 6, Outlawz Season 1, Champions, Adulting Season 1 and 2 and Youngins on Showmax. The series is directed by Zolani Phakade and the show's producer is Khobi Ledwaba.

== Plot ==
Season 1

The series is about a man who seemingly has it all: money, love, family, power, glory and respect.

The telenovela is set in the Friendly city and revolves around the polygamous marriage of Luzuko Mxenge (Mbulelo Grootboom), a successful businessman who is husband to three very different wives. They are: Bulelwa Mxenge (Zikhona Sodlaka), Zimkhitha Mxenge (Zandile Msutwana), and Nozuko Mxenge (Kay Bikitsha). He has sons, but his favourite is Thulani (Thembinkosi Ngcukana). What more could he want? Another wife. We meet Anathi Njoloza (Akhenime Mfenyana) Luzuko's fourth wife who is Thulani's love interest.

Season 2

The war gets darker in the second season of the show with Zandile Msutwane leading the cast as the vicious Zimkhitha Mxenge. Co-Starring along her is Bongile Mantsai as Hlumelo Mxenge. The second season removed Zikhona Sodlaka who starred as Bulelwa Mxenge and Mbulelo Grootbom as Luzuko Mxenge who were the lead actors of the show in its previous season. Former Gomora actress Zinzi Nsele, who played the role of Miss Madikizela, will be among those joining Gqeberha: The Empire season two. Nsele, who will play the role of Vuyokazi, will be joined on set by Rorisang Mohapi as Lulama. The duo is set to stir up the storyline. The new season will dive deeper into the themes of family, power, and redemption, with complicated storylines that reveal the layers of each character and their relationships within the turbulent world of Gqeberha.

Vuyokazi and Lulama play pivotal roles in the upcoming season.

Vuyokazi, Stokkie’s aunt, is introduced as a moral compass and a junior police officer actively engaged in community policing. She becomes a key figure in investigating the Mxenge family’s involvement in crime and tries to bring down the wealthy family’s empire.

Lulama, Vuyokazi’s daughter, brings a dramatic twist to the plot with her manipulative nature and obsession with Thulani, leading to intense twists and turns in the storyline.

On the other hand, Stokkie falls in love with a woman named Yoliswa who manipulates him into doing whatever she wants even killing her husband after lying about him being abusive but in the end she is arrested after being caught.

Season 3

M-Net and MultiChoice have officially confirmed that the popular telenovela Gqeberha: The Empire will not return for a third season. The decision to cancel the show comes after declining viewership ratings, marking the end of the series after two seasons.

Gqeberha: The Empire premiered in early 2023 and quickly gained attention for its unique setting in the Eastern Cape, specifically in the city of Gqeberha. The telenovela followed the story of a powerful businessman with multiple wives and the challenges they face as a family. Despite its unique representation of Xhosa culture and stunning visuals, the show struggled to maintain high ratings over time.

In a joint statement, M-Net and MultiChoice expressed their disappointment over the show's cancellation. "After a thorough review of the show's performance, we regret to inform viewers that Gqeberha: The Empire will not be renewed for a third season. While the show resonated with some audiences, it did not achieve the sustained viewership necessary for continuation."

Despite its initial promise, Gqeberha: The Empire faced stiff competition from other telenovelas and struggled to keep viewers engaged, leading to its eventual cancellation.

Fans of the show have expressed mixed reactions on social media, while cast members shared their gratitude for the opportunity to be part of the production. The show's cultural impact will be remembered, and M-Net and MultiChoice hinted at exploring new productions to continue investing in local content.

== Cast and characters ==
Actor	Role	Season 1	Season 2	Season 3
Mbulelo Grootboom	Luzuko Mxenge	Main		
Zandile Msutwana	Zimkhitha Mxenge	Main	Main	Main
Zikhona Sodlaka	Bulelwa Bullet Mxenge	Main		Guest
Bongile Mantsai	Hlumelo Mxenge	Recurring	Main	Main
Litha Ngcukana	Thulani Mxenge	Main	Main	Main
Akhenime Mfenyana	Anathi Mxenge	Main	Recurring	
Oros Mampofu	Ntando Mxenge		Main	Main
Phila Madlingozi	Ntando Mxenge	Main		
Anele Matoti	Msimelelo Makwethu	Main	Main	Main
Unati Guma	Funeka Makwethu	Main	Main	Main
Siziphiwe Maqubeka	Nontle Makwethu	Main	Main	
Lonalinamandla Bawuti	Nobomi Mxenge	Main	Main	
Kay Bikitsha	Nozuko Mxenge	Main	Main	
Ayanda McKay	Stokkie	Recurring	Main	
Zinzi Nsele	Vuyokazi		Main	Main
Rorisang Mohapi	Lulama		Main	
Zimi Banisi	Mpilo Mxenge	Main		
Sibabalwe Bobo	Fundiswa Mxenge	Main		
Sinazo Yolwa	Yoliswa		Recurring	
Likhey Booi	Sivuyile Makwethu	Main	Main	Main
Matil Mohapeloa	Bongiwe Zwide			Main

== Accolades ==
=== South Africa Film and Television Awards ===
Year	Nominee / work	Award	Result	Ref.
2024	Gqeberha: The Empire	Best Telenovela	Nominated	
2024	Gqeberha: The Empire	Most Popular TV Soap/Telenovela	Nominated	
2024	Gqeberha: The Empire	Best Actress (Telenovela) - Zikhona Sodlaka	Won	
