= Themba Mncube =

South African filmmaker and actor

- Born: Thembalethu Brian Ntuli; 7 March 1991 (age 35); Ekurhuleni, South Africa
- Education: AFDA, The School for the Creative Economy
- Occupations: Director, Actor, Model
- Years active: 2007–present
- Height: 120 cm (3 ft 11 in)
- Spouse: Hope Masilo (m. 2019)

Thembalethu Brian Ntuli (born 7 March 1991), also known by his professional name Themba Mncube, is a South African filmmaker and actor. He is best known for the roles in the television serials such as Rhythm City, B&B and the film Lokoza.

== Personal life ==
Mncube was born on 7 March 1991 in South Africa. He grew up in Ekhuruleni on the East Rand. He completed education from Germiston. Since school times, he went to drama classes. He graduated with a degree in filmmaking from the AFDA, The School for the Creative Economy (AFDA Johannesburg).

He is married to his longtime partner Hope Masilo. They started the affair in 2008. The wedding was held at EnGedi: The Oasis in the Cradle, Muldersdrift in March 2019.

== Career ==
As an actor, he appeared in the popular television commercials for 'Sunlight' and 'South African Broadcasting Corporation' (SABC2). After graduation, he joined with Moonyeen Lee and Associates. In 2008 when he was in grade 11, Mncube played a popular recurring role as the young car guard "Pule" in the e.tv soap opera Rhythm City from May to June, 2008. In the same year, Mncube starred in a brand campaign for SABC2. In 2011, he became very popular with the television commercial 'Vodacom.'

In 2015, he was cast in the lead role of "Cuba" in the e.tv sitcom B&B. In 2016, he acted in the film Lokoza directed by Isabelle Mayor. In 2018, he acted in the films Frank & Fearless and Meerkat Maantuig.

== Filmography ==
Year	Film	Role	Genre	Ref.
2008	Rhythm City	Pule	TV series	
2011	Soul Buddyz	Brains	TV series	
2013	Mad Dogs	Tokoloshe	TV series	
2014	Task Force	Boy	TV series	
2014	Zaziwa	Himself	TV series	
2015	Those Who Can't	James	TV series	
2015	B&B	Cuba	TV series	
2015	Him, Her & the Guys	Lesedi	TV series	
2016	Lokoza	Actor	Film	
2018	Frank & Fearless	Fearless	Film	
2018	Meerkat Maantuig	Bhubesi	Film	
2019	Shadow	Moses	TV series	
2021	Unpacked with Relebogile Mabotja	guest role	TV series	
