= Milnerton High School =

Location
- 48 Pienaar Road, Milnerton; Cape Town, Western Cape; South Africa; 33°52′18″S 18°29′49″E

Information
- Type: Public school
- Motto: Latin: Lux Esto (Let there be light)
- Established: 1959
- School district: Metro North Education District
- Headmaster: Mr Van Tonder
- Deputy Headmaster: Iqbal Cassim
- Deputy Headmistress: Trudy Pentz
- Grades: 8 to 12
- Gender: Co-educational
- Age: 13 to 18
- Campus: Urban Campus
- Campus size: Medium to large
- Campus type: Suburban
- Houses: Graaff, Hoffmeyr, Merriman, Milner
- Colours: Navy blue, gold and white
- Athletics: Yes
- Nickname: Millies
- Accreditation: Western Cape Education Department
- Newspaper: Pharos
- Website: www.milnertonhighschool.co.za

Milnerton High School (MHS) is a public English medium co-educational high school for grades 8 to 12, situated in the Milnerton suburb of Cape Town, Western Cape, South Africa.

The school was founded in 1959, and expanded continually—particularly since the early 2000s—to welcome students coming from well beyond central Milnerton. It now serves students residing in both affluent suburbs and townships surrounding Milnerton.

== Academics ==
Milnerton High School has been notably well-performing, achieving a 100% Grade 12 pass rate for 16 years in a row, from 2004 until 2019. The school's academic performance regularly exceeds the average public school's expectation, with an exceptionally high pass rate averaging 99.9% yearly between 2004 and 2020, compared to the average national pass rate of 78.4% between 2017 and 2020. Over the years, several top achieving students and alumni from Milnerton High School have also made headlines in several local and national newspapers.

Other than the generally compulsory subjects of English (Home Language) and Afrikaans (First Additional Language), the school offers a variety of subjects at a Further Education and Training level (FET, i.e. grades 10 to 12):

- Mathematics (Maths) or Mathematical Literacy (Maths Lit)
- Physical Sciences
- Life Sciences (Biology)
- Accounting
- Business Studies
- Economics (from 2023)
- Computer Applications Technology (CAT)
- Consumer Studies (Home Economics)
- Design
- Dramatic Arts (Drama)
- Visual Art
- Geography
- History
- Tourism
- Music

The school also offers external subjects. These are generally taught after normal school hours and not on school grounds, and are:

- Advanced Programme Mathematics (AP Maths, somewhat similar but not identical to the United States' Advanced Placement Math programme)
- Information Technology (IT)

== Sport ==
=== Rugby ===
Milnerton High School's Rugby First Team and Old Boys Teams compete in provincial tournaments. The Milnerton Old Boys Association enters teams into international rugby tournaments, and in early 2020 competed in the Cape Town Tens Rugby Tournament. The team was invited to compete in the 2010 Malaysian Rugby Tens Tournament.

== Notable alumni ==
- Damian de Allende, player in South Africa's national rugby team, the Springboks
- Wouter Basson, cardiologist and former head of the Apartheid government's chemical and biological warfare project
- Jim Murphy, former Scottish Labour Member of Parliament for East Renfrewshire and former Minister of State for Europe
- Mark Nigrini, professor at West Virginia University
- Ethan du Preez, Olympic swimmer who competed in the 2020 Summer Olympics
- Natasha Thahane, actress and model
- Lungile Tsolekile, South African field hockey player who competed in the 2008 Summer Olympics

== Controversies ==
=== 2025 bullying incident ===
In October 2025, the school was the site of a serious bullying incident involving a Grade 10 learner and several senior students. A video surfaced online showing the victim being assaulted by a group of older boys, reportedly members of the school's rugby team. The incident led to public outrage and calls for accountability.

The Western Cape Education Department initiated an internal investigation, and the involved students were suspended. Eight pupils, aged 17 to 18, were charged with assault with intent to cause grievous bodily harm. They were granted bail with conditions, including no contact with the victim and restrictions on entering the school premises. The case was postponed to January 2026 to allow the accused to complete their examinations.

The incident has sparked many widespread discussions about school safety and the culture within sports teams, particularly rugby, at the school. Various organisations and political parties have condemned the actions and called for reforms to prevent such occurrences in the future.
