= Busisiwe =

- Gender: Female
- Language: Nguni languages

Other gender
- Masculine: Sibusiso

Origin
- Meaning: Blessed/Blessing

Other names
- Nicknames: Siwe, Bucie, Cici

Busisiwe is a feminine given name derived from the Nguni word busisa, meaning "to bless". Notable people with the name include:

- Busisiwe Mavuso (born 1977 or 1978), South African businesswoman
- Busisiwe Mkhwebane (born 1970), South African advocate and prosecutor
- Busisiwe Mncube, South African politician
- Busisiwe Ndimeni (born 1991), South African footballer
- Busisiwe Nolubabalo Nqwiliso (born 1987), South African singer known as Bucie
- Busisiwe Shiba (born 1965), South African politician
- Busisiwe Thwala (born 1987), South African musician and actress known as Cici (singer)
- Busisiwe Tshwete (born 1981), South African politician
- Victoria Busisiwe Mhlongo (1947–2010), singer, dancer and composer known as Busi Mhlongo
