= Damian de Allende =

South African rugby union player

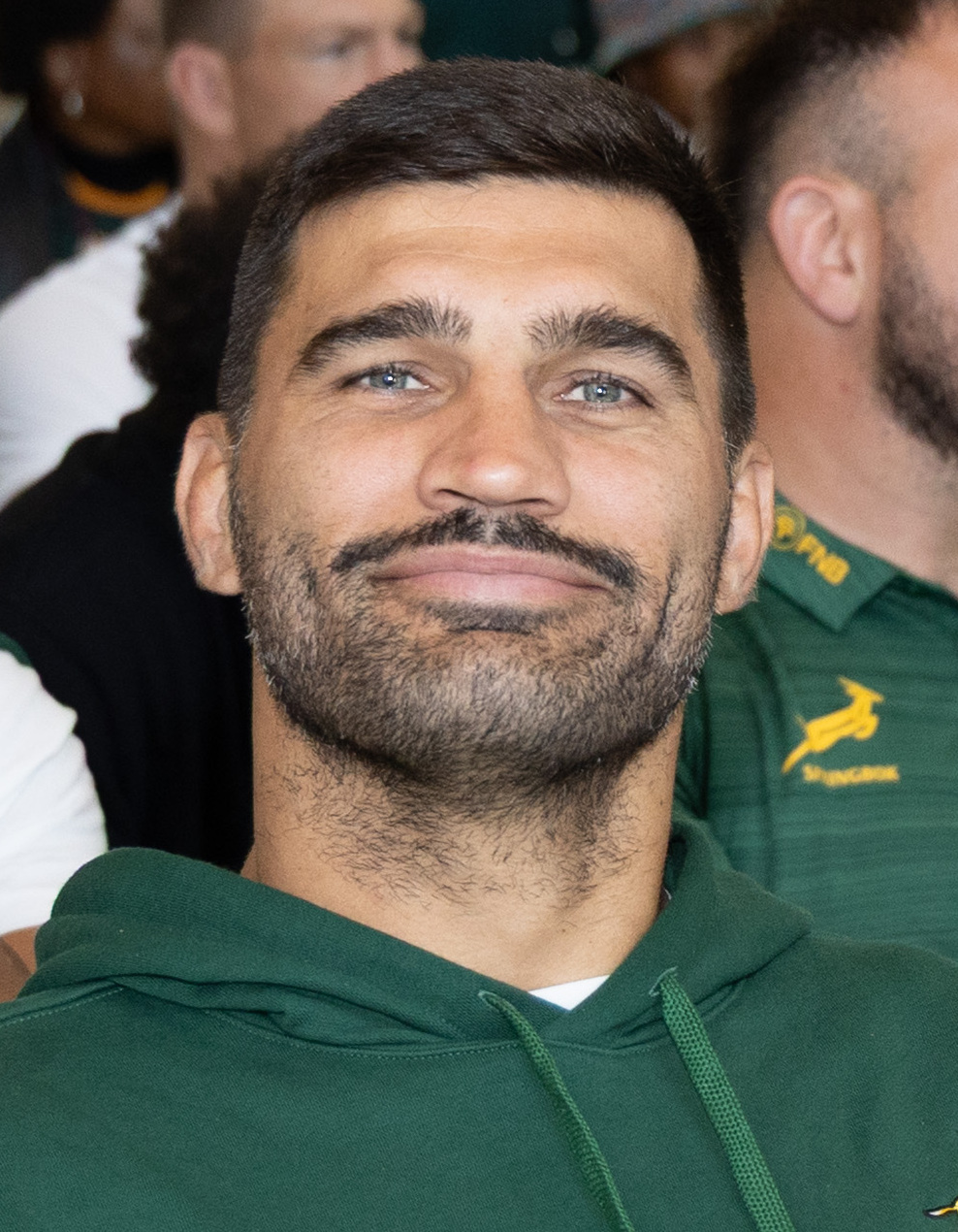
- de Allende playing in 2026
- Born: 25 November 1991 (age 34) Cape Town, Cape Province, South Africa
- Height: 1.89 m (6 ft 2 in)
- Weight: 101 kg (15.9 st; 223 lb)
- School: Milnerton High School
- University: University of Cape Town

Rugby union career
- Position(s): Centre, Wing
Youth career
- 2010–2012: Western Province
Amateur team(s)
Years	Team	Apps	(Points)
2012	UCT Ikey Tigers	6	(5)
Senior career
Years	Team	Apps	(Points)
2012–2018	Western Province	27	(30)
2013–2019	Stormers	91	(75)
2015–2017	Kintetsu Liners	4	(5)
2019–2020 2022–	Panasonic Wild Knights	65	(114)
2020–2022	Munster	37	(25)
- Correct as of 6 June 2026
International career
Years	Team	Apps	(Points)
2014–	South Africa	103	(70)
2015–2025	Springboks (Note: In addition to playing in test matches, De Allende featured in a match against a World XV in Cape Town in July 2015. This match has an equivalent status to international tour matches, but was played on home soil.)	2	(15)
2021	South Africa A	2	(0)
- Correct as of 12 September 2026
Medal record
Men's Rugby union
Representing South Africa
Rugby World Cup
Bronze medal – third place	2015 England	Squad
Gold medal – first place	2019 Japan	Squad
Gold medal – first place	2023 France	Squad

Damian de Allende (born 25 November 1991) is a South African professional rugby union player who currently plays for the South Africa national team and Japanese club Saitama Wild Knights. His usual position is either centre or wing. He was a member of the Springboks team that won a third Rugby World Cup in 2019 and again that won a fourth Rugby World Cup in 2023. De Allende is a part of a few elite players to have won two world cup titles.

== Early life ==
De Allende was born in Cape Town in 1991. He is of Spanish and Portuguese descent. He was educated at Milnerton High School in Cape Town's seaside town of Milnerton, and later attended the University of Cape Town, representing the UCT Ikey Tigers in the Varsity Cup.

== Career ==
Damian de Allende made his first team debut for Western Province during the 2012 Vodacom Cup, in their game against Pampas XV. He made a total of three appearances in that campaign, scoring one try. He was then also included in the squad for the 2012 Currie Cup Premier Division.

In August 2013, he signed a two-year contract that kept him at Western Province and the Stormers until 2015.

After the 2019 Rugby World Cup, where de Allende was a member of the victorious South African team, he joined Japanese Top League side Saitama Wild Knights. De Allende joined Irish United Rugby Championship side Munster, whose head coach was former Springboks forwards coach Johann van Graan. Though de Allende's two-year contract didn't officially commence until 1 July 2020, he arrived in Ireland in May 2020 after the cancellation of the remainder of the 2019–20 Top League and completed two weeks of isolation due to the COVID-19 pandemic.

De Allende made his debut for Munster in their 27–25 defeat against Leinster on 22 August 2020, and scored his first try for the province in their 52–3 win against Italian side Zebre in round 8 of the 2020–21 Pro14 on 30 November 2020. He made his Champions Cup debut for the province in their opening fixture of the 2020–21 competition against English side Harlequins on 13 December 2020, starting in Munster's 21–7 home win. De Allende was named in the 2020–21 Pro14 Dream Team in his first season with Munster.

De Allende left Munster at the end of the 2021–22 season, and returned to Japan to rejoin League One club Saitama Wild Knights, for whom de Allende had previously played for during 2019–20.

== International career ==
Of Spanish heritage on his father's side, De Allende was eligible to represent both South Africa or Spain at international level.

In May 2014, De Allende was one of eight uncapped players that were called up to a Springbok training camp prior to the 2014 mid-year rugby union tests. He was subsequently named in the final squad, but suffered a medial knee ligament injury and had to withdraw from the squad.

However, he was once again selected in the Springboks' next squad for the 2014 Rugby Championship and was named in the starting line-up for their opening match of this competition against Argentina in Pretoria.

In 2015, he was selected in the starting XV of a South African side against the World XV for a game held on 11 July 2015. He scored two tries in the game, earning praise from the World XV and former Australia coach Robbie Deans, who commented that "Damian has been playing remarkable rugby the whole year and he keeps doing the right things. He can add a new dimension to the Boks".

Having only been on the field for 13 minutes, De Allende was controversially red-carded in the 75th minute of New Zealand's 25–24 win against South Africa on 8 October 2017 for a late hit on first-five Lima Sopoaga, intending to charge down Sopoaga's attempted drop goal. De Allende was not suspended, as SANZAAR stated he should not have received red for the attempted charge down.

De Allende was named in South Africa's squad for the 2019 Rugby World Cup. South Africa went on to win the tournament, defeating England in the final. De Allende started in all three tests for South Africa during the 2021 British & Irish Lions tour to South Africa, earning his 50th cap for the Springboks during their third test victory that sealed a series win for the home team, and garnering widespread praise for his performances during the series.

In July 2026, after a 45–21 victory in the opening round of the inaugural Nations Championship against England, he was incorrectly awarded Player of the Match after a miscommunication by the local South African broadcaster. Damian Willemse was the actual winner.

== Personal life ==
De Allende married fiance Domenica Vigliotti in late 2023 in France following South Africa's title at the Rugby World Cup. They have two children.

De Allende is a die-hard supporter of Premier League football club Liverpool, with the sport being described as his "first love" before playing junior rugby.

== Honours ==
South Africa

- 2019 Rugby Championship winner
- 2019 Rugby World Cup winner
- 2021 British & Irish Lions Series winner
- 2023 Rugby World Cup winner
- 2024 Rugby Championship winner
- 2025 Rugby Championship winner

== Statistics ==
=== Super Rugby statistics ===
As of 23 August 2021.

Season	Team	Games	Starts	Sub	Mins	Tries	Cons	Pens	Drops	Points	Yel	Red
2013	Stormers	14	8	6	737	0	0	0	0	0	0	0
2014	Stormers	14	14	0	1,109	4	0	0	0	20	0	0
2015	Stormers	16	16	0	1,171	4	0	0	0	20	0	0
2016	Stormers	11	9	2	785	2	0	0	0	10	0	0
2017	Stormers	6	5	1	382	0	0	0	0	0	0	0
2018	Stormers	16	16	0	1,238	3	0	0	0	15	1	0
2019	Stormers	14	13	1	1,026	2	0	0	0	10	0	0
Total		91	81	10	6,523	15	0	0	0	75	1	0

=== Springboks record ===
As of 15 November 2026.

Against	Played	Won	Drawn	Lost	Tries	Points	% Won
Argentina	17	15	0	2	2	10	88.24
Australia	9	3	1	5	1	5	33.33
British & Irish Lions	3	2	0	1	0	0	66.67
Canada	1	1	0	0	1	5	100
England	10	7	0	3	0	0	70
France	5	3	0	2	1	5	60
Georgia	1	1	0	0	0	0	100
Ireland	9	4	0	5	1	5	44.44
Italy	5	4	0	1	1	5	80
Japan	3	3	0	0	0	0	100
Namibia	1	1	0	0	0	0	100
New Zealand	23	9	1	13	4	20	39.13
Samoa	1	1	0	0	0	0	100
Scotland	4	4	0	0	0	0	100
United States	1	1	0	0	1	5	100
Wales	12	10	0	2	1	5	83.33
Total	105	69	2	34	13	65	65.71

=== International tries ===
As of 13 September 2026

Try	Opposing team	Location	Venue	Competition	Date	Result	Score
1	United States	London, England	Olympic Stadium	2015 Rugby World Cup Pool B	7 October 2015	Win	64–0
2	Ireland	Johannesburg, South Africa	Ellis Park Stadium	2016 Ireland tour of South Africa	18 June 2016	Win	32–26
3	Italy	Florence, Italy	Stadio Artemio Franchi	2016 end-of-year tests	19 November 2016	Loss	20–18
4	New Zealand	Pretoria, South Africa	Loftus Versfeld Stadium	2018 Rugby Championship	6 October 2018	Loss	30–32
5	Canada	Kobe, Japan	Kobe Misaki Stadium	2019 Rugby World Cup Pool B	8 October 2019	Win	66–7
6	Wales	Yokohama, Japan	International Stadium Yokohama	2019 Rugby World Cup semi-finals	27 October 2019	Win	16–19
7	New Zealand	Gold Coast, Australia	Robina Stadium	2021 Rugby Championship	2 October 2021	Win	29–31
8	Australia	Sydney, Australia	Sydney Football Stadium	2022 Rugby Championship	3 September 2022	Win	8–24
9	Argentina	Buenos Aires, Argentina	Estadio Libertadores de América	2022 Rugby Championship	17 September 2022	Win	20–36
10	Argentina	Johannesburg, South Africa	Ellis Park Stadium	2023 Rugby Championship	29 July 2023	Win	22–21
11	France	Saint-Denis, France	Stade de France	2023 Rugby World Cup quarter-finals	15 October 2023	Win	28–29
12	New Zealand	Cape Town, South Africa	Cape Town Stadium	2026 New Zealand tour of South Africa	29 August 2026	Win	33–26
13	New Zealand	Baltimore, United States	M&T Bank Stadium	2026 New Zealand tour of South Africa	12 September 2026	Win	43–28
