= Natasha Thahane =

South African actress and model

- Born: Nokuthula Natasha Tutu; 25 September 1995 (age 30); Orlando East, Soweto, South Africa
- Other name: Thahane (maternal last name)
- Education: Milnerton High School
- Alma mater: University of the Witwatersrand; New York Film Academy
- Years active: 2013–present
- Children: 1
- Family: Desmond Tutu (grandfather)

Nokuthula Natasha Thahane Tutu (born 25 September 1995) is a South African actress, model and media personality. She is best known for her roles in the television series Blood & Water, Skeem Saam, The Queen, and It's OK We're Family. Recently joined the BET drama Isono playing a role of Millicent.

== Early life ==
Thahane was born in Orlando East to Trevor Thamsanqa Tutu and Nomaswazi Mamakoko. She is the granddaughter of Archbishop Desmond Tutu. She moved to Cape Town where she attended Milnerton High School. She went on to graduate with a degree in accounting from the University of the Witwatersrand. In 2018, she completed a 1-Year Conservatory program in Acting for Film at the New York Film Academy in Manhattan.

== Career ==
Thahane first appeared on screen in a 2013 Edgars commercial. The following year, she made her television series debut in an installment of the e.tv anthology eKasi: Our Stories titled "Drama King". She returned the following year for another installment, "uManqoba". She made a guest appearance as Fundiswa in season 1 of Saints and Sinners and reprised the role as a recurring character in season 2.

From 2015 to 2016, Thahane gained prominence through her role as Enhle Tango in the SABC1 soap opera Skeem Saam. She left to join the cast of the Mzansi Magic televnovela The Queen as Amogelang Maake. She was series regular for the first two seasons and then a recurring for the next two. She starred as Leshae K in the SABC3 series It's OK We're Family. In 2019, she played the role Katlego Jali in seasons 4 and 5 Lockdown.

In 2020, she began playing Wendy Dlamini in the Netflix teen crime drama Blood & Water. That same year, she appeared in the BET Africa series Isono and was appointed as the brand ambassador of "Garnier Even & Matte". Meanwhile, she also appeared in the reality show Top Billing.

== Personal life ==
Thahane briefly dated football player Thembinkosi Lorch from June to September 2021. Thahane is a mother to a son, there is no information on who the father of the boy is.

== Filmography ==
=== Film ===
Year	Film	Role	Notes
2020	Kedibone	Kedibone Manamela	

=== Television ===
Year	Film	Role	Notes
2014–2015	eKasi: Our Stories	Claire	2 episodes
2013	Mama stole my hunk		main role
2014	Single Galz	Thuli	1 episode
2014	Saints and Sinners	Fundiswa	Recurring role
2015–2016	Skeem Saam	Enhle Tango	Recurring role
2016	Ses'Top La	Unathi	1 episode
2016–2020	The Queen	Amogelang Maake	Main role (seasons 1–2); Recurring role (season 3–4)
2017–2018	It's OK We're Family	Leshae K	Main role
2019	Imbewu: The Seed	Liyana	Season 1
2019	Lockdown	Katlego Jali	Seasons 4–5
2020–present	Blood & Water	Wendy Dlamini	Main role
2020–present	Isono	Millicent Zondo	
