= Maumela Mahuwa =

Maumela Mahuwa (born 16 March 1980) is a South African actress, preacher, gospel singer and motivational speaker. She is also a co-founder of a film school in Johannesburg, the African Academy of Cinematic Arts. She is best known for her role on SABC 2's popular soapie of Muvhango, where she starred as Susan since the show's inception in 1997. Maumela Mahuwa was born in Gogobole in Sinthumule, a village in the Limpopo Province of South Africa.

== Early life ==
Mahuwa was born in Gogobole in Sinthumule, a village in the Limpopo Province of South Africa. She grew up in the small village of Mamvuka, Limpopo, raised by her mother; who later disappeared when Maumela was around 11 or 12 years of age. She was taken in by relatives during that time with her mother returning 5 years later.

== Filmography ==
Year	Title	Role	Notes
1997-2025	Muvhango	Susan	TV Series
2022	The Wrong Girl	Officer Mabula	Short Film
2022	My Oyibo Queen		Film
