= Joyce Skefu =

Tswana-South African actress

- Born: Joyce Skefu; 14 April 1964 (age 62); Botswana
- Education: University of St. Thomas
- Occupations: Actress, Voice artist
- Years active: 1997–present
- Children: 2

Joyce Skefu (born 14 April 1964) is a Motswana-South African actress and voice artist. She is best known for the roles in the television serials such as; Muvhango, Scandal! and Abomama.

== Personal life ==
Skefu was born on 14 April 1964 in Botswana and moved to Soweto, Gauteng. She later grew up in Bloemfontein with her grandparents and Lesotho. She graduated with a higher Diploma in Beauty Therapy from the University of St. Thomas in Texas, Houston.

She was married, but her husband died after few years of marriage. She is a mother of two children. She was involved in two car accidents in 2010 and 2014, but survived with minor injuries.

== Career ==
In 1997, she made her television debut with the soap opera Muvhango and played the role "Doris Mokoena" with huge popularity. For her role, she was nominated five times as a Best Actress and won 2 of them. Then she won the Duku Duku award, voted by the public. She was then celebrated as a “crowd puller” by SABC2, where her signature line, “You must never . . .” became a fan following. Then she made her film debut in 1998 with the Direct-to-video film Voete van Goud and played the role "Maphiri". In early 2000, she appeared on the popular AIDS drama series Phamokate.

In 2015, she joined with the cast of popular e.tv soap opera Scandal! where she played the role as "Maletsatsi Khumalo" for more than 12 consecutive years. In 2018, she played the role "Fumane" in the Mzansi Magic drama series Abomama. After gained popularity, she reprised her role in the second season of the series. In the meantime, she also appeared in the second season of another Mzansi Magic drama series Imposter with the role "Valeta". She also won the Best actress in theatre award in London at White House Theatre. In 2020, she joined with the SABC2 telenovela and played the role "Moipone".

Apart from acting, she appeared in front of public with many professions such as; health advisor, aerobics instructor, first aid Red Cross Facilitator, HIV/AIDS councillor, Ambassador for SA Tourism, and Minister of the church.

== Filmography ==
Year	Film	Role	Genre	Ref.
1997	Muvhango	Doris Mokoena	TV series	
1998	Voete van Goud	Maphiri	TV movie	
2015	Scandal!	Maletsatsi Khumalo	TV series	
2018	Abomama	Fumane	TV series	
2018	Imposter	Valeta	TV series	
2020	Lithapo	Moipone	TV series	
