= Isono =

Isono (written: 磯野) is a Japanese surname. Notable people with the surname include:

- Hiroo Isono (磯野 宏夫; 1945–2013), Japanese painter and illustrator
- Isono Kazumasa (磯野 員昌; 1534–1583), Japanese samurai
- Kiriko Isono (磯野 貴理子; born 1964), Japanese comedian, entertainer and actress
- Isono Tamba-no-kami (磯野 丹波), Japanese samurai
