= Azania Mosaka =

South African actress and media personality

- Born: Azania Mosaka; 18 April 1977 (age 49); Soweto, South Africa
- Education: University of Witwatersrand
- Occupations: Broadcaster, Journalist, Business woman, Speaker, Philanthropist, Podcaster
- Years active: 1996–present
- Spouse: Tony Ndoro (2005-2011)
- Children: Shamiso Mosaka, Tatenda Ndoro
- Parents: Rabotapi Mosaka (father); Ouma Mosaka (mother)

Azania Mosaka (born 18 April 1977), is a South African broadcaster and journalist. She started her radio career in music radio working at Metro FM at the South African Broadcasting Corporation (SABC) in 2001. She made her first mark by presenting Metro FM's afternoon drive show, "Route 326". She then moved to the breakfast show, "The Sound of Breakfast", making her the first woman in South Africa to present the breakfast show of a commercial radio station and the first to have presented both drive shows. This was followed by the mid-morning show "Total Bliss". After 13 at Metro FM, Azania transitioned to talk radio by moving to Power 987 where she hosted "Power Lunch". In 2015, she moved to 702 where she hosted "The Azania Mosaka Show". Radio 702".

== Personal life ==
Azania Mosaka was born on 18 April 1977 in Pimville, Soweto, South Africa in a family with three siblings. She grew up only with her mother Ouma Mosaka, who was a nurse. Her father Rabotapi Mosaka left the family when she was small.

She married Tony Ndoro in 2005, but later divorced in 2011. She has two children, a daughter and a son.

== Career ==
She studied Communication Management at Vega School. Azania also holds an Honours in Journalism and Media Studies (cum laude) from the University of the Witwatersrand's WITS Centre for Journalism In 1996, when she was 18, Azania started her media career by co-hosting a youth talk show called The Joint which aired on CCV-TV which later became SABC 1. After the show's third season, she moved to London for three years to travel while working odd jobs.

After her return to South Africa, she did HIV/Aids advocacy work for loveLife a non-profit organisation focused on youth health promotion. Her program was to facilitate conversations about HIV/Aids stigma reduction and creating awareness about the disease. She travelled to communities in urban, rural and townships settings hosting conversations with communities. Azania's advocacy includes issues of social justice, protection of human rights and gender equality. She now runs Peo Impact Gardens, a non-profit organisation that develops school gardens in schools in Soweto. Peo creates organic vegetable gardens in disadvantaged schools to supplement the national School Nutrition Program and support families in need. Vegetables are cultivated and harvested on the school premises and used in the school kitchen.

Her television work expanded to presenting Bassiq on SABC 1. She went on to host several television shows including Backstreet live on e-TV, Noted on SABC 3 and Real Talk on SABC3.

Azania's radio career began when she joined Metro FM as a producer for Glen Lewis’ show The Ride in 2002. From working on The Ride she moved to presenting Midnight Oasis, putting her time in during the dark hours of the night. Before long, she earned the attention of her bosses who gave her the drive time slot (Route 326). The appointment of Azania to the afternoon slot initially sparked controversy about whether the former graveyard shift host could succeed at this crucial new position, but Azania silenced her critics with growing audience figures. She was then promoted to and the breakfast slot – The Sound of Breakfast- making her the first woman to host a breakfast show on a commercial radio station in South Africa. After that she was promoted to the 9-12 slot, hosting Total Bliss which had the second highest listenership on the station's mid-week lineup.

After 13 years at Metro FM, Azania joined start-up talk radio station, Power 987, where she hosted Power Lunch. Unhappy with the developments at Power FM, she moved to 702 in 2015. She would later leave the station to advance the social causes she cares about such as ending child hunger through her Non-profit organisation Peo Impact Gardens.
