= Muvhango =

South African television soap opera

- Promotional poster
- Genre: Soap opera
- Created by: Duma Ndlovu
- Written by: Loyiso Maqoma; Pamela Power; Nontuthuzelo Magoxo; Tsholofelo Ndlovu; Awelani Makhuvha; Sarah Smith; Amor Tredoux; Jacques Du Rand; Marina Bekker; Vusi Khoza
- Directed by: Jedi Mulovhedzi; Sipho Nhlaka Myeni; Sibongiseni Zondi; Tamie Madlakana; Raai Mokoena; Azwimmbhavi Rambuda
- Creative director: Nthabi Tau
- Starring: Gabriel Temudzani; Maumela Mahuwa; Dingaan Khumalo; Leleti Khumalo; Wiseman Zitha; Liteboho Molise; Innocentia Manchidi; Sydney Ramakuwela; Regina Nesengani; Elsie Rasalanavho; Zonke Mchunu; Nathaniel Ramabulana; Hastings Muravha; Candy Magidimisa; Ronewa Mudau; Tebatso Mashishi; Wavhudi Lidzhengu; Rinae Mmbobo; Eunice Mabeta; David Sebe; Tyson Mathonsi; Mulanga Rashikinya; Mufunwa Mudau; Azwimmbhavi Rambuda; Gugulethu Mzobe; Gabisile Tshabalala; Obed Baloyi; Masutang Rasekele; Nkateko Mabunda; Junior Magagane; Nyeleti Ndubane; Rendani Litelu; Phuthego Mahlatji
- Original languages: Tshivenda; English; Sesotho; isiZulu; isiXhosa
- No. of episodes: 4893

Production
- Executive producer: Duma Ndlovu
- Producers: Herbert Hadebe; Leo Phiri; Malebo Mokoena
- Running time: 24 - 26 minutes
- Production company: Word of Mouth Pictures(current production company) Rhythm World Productions(sold to Word of Mouth)

Original release
- Network: SABC2
- Release: 7 April 1997 – 12 August 2025

Related
- Imbewu: The Seed

Muvhango is a South African television soap opera, created by Duma Ndlovu. It was broadcast on the public TV channel SABC 2, and had an average of 4 million daily viewers during its latter run before its conclusion. The first episode was aired on 7 April 1997. It was the first Tshivenda language TV drama, but later became multilingual in order to showcase that languages and cultures of South Africa should be used to unite rather than divide, even so Tshivenda is its primary language.

The show is built on a premise that "umuntu ngumuntu ngabantu" meaning that we exist within a context. The show has strong family orientated storylines that seeks to speak to the conflict between the traditional and the modern ways. The Vhakwevho's are the custodians of the traditional side of things while the Johannesburg lot focuses on the modern ways.

In 2006 the series was nominated for the South African Film and Television Award for best soap opera.

In 2025, Muvhango ended after 28 years - with its last episode airing on 12 August, effectively leaving SABC 2 without a cornerstone program in the Venda language.

== Main cast ==
| Actor/Actress | Role | Status |
|---|---|---|
| Gabriel Temudzani | Azwindini Mukwevho | Leading Role |
| Maumela Mahuwa | Susan Mukwevho | Leading Role |
| Dingaan Khumalo | James Motsamai | Leading Role |
| Leleti Khumalo | Dr Nonhlanhla Ximba-Ramabulana | Leading Role |
| Liteboho Molise | Teboho Mukwevho | Leading Role |
| Innocentia Manchidi | Rendani Mukwevho | Leading Role |
| Sydney Ramakuwela | Mulalo Mukwevho | Leading Role |
| Regina Nesengani | Vho Masindi Mukwevho | Leading Role |
| Zonke Mchunu | Imani Nkosi | Leading Role |
| Nathaniel Ramabulana | Tendamudzimu Mudau | Leading Role |
| Hastings Muravha | Avathakali Ramabulana | Leading Role |
| Ronewa Mudau | Lindelani Mukwevho | Leading Role |
| Wiseman Zitha | Ndemedzo | Leading Role |
| Azwimmbhavi Rambuda | Mpho Mudau | Supporting Role |
| Tebatso Mashishi | Kgosi Mulaudzi | Supporting Role |
| Wavhudi Lidzengu | Vhutshilo Mukwevho | Supporting Role |
| Candy Magidimisa | Sharon Mukwevho | Supporting Role |
| Rinae Mmbobo | Muvhango Mukwevho | Supporting Role |
| Tyson Mathonsi | Sakhile Ximba-Makgoba | Supporting Role |
| Mulanga Rashikinya | Ndiwavho | Supporting Role |
| Gugulethu Mzobe | Nomvula | Supporting Role |
| Mufunwa Mudau | Ndwakhulu Mukwevho | Supporting Role |
| Obed Baloyi | Mr Rivombo | Supporting Role |
| Masutang Rasekele | Mrs Rivombo | Supporting Role |
| Gabisile Tshabalala | Bubbles | Supporting Role |

== Former cast ==
| Actor/Actress | Role | Status |
|---|---|---|
| Marah Louw | Catherine Mukhwevho | Leading Role |
| Joyce Skefu | Doris Mokoena | Leading Role |
| Glen Lewis | Edward Mukhwevho | Leading Role |
| Mpho Tsedu | Edward Mukhwevho | Leading Role |
| Sindi Dlathu | Thandaza Mokoena | Leading Role |
| Reshoketwe Mmoala | Tumi Mokoena | Leading Role |
| Brian Temba | Ranthomeng Mokoena | Leading Role |
| Themba Nofemele | Ranthomeng Mokoena | Leading Role |
| Fezile Makhanya | Muzi Cele | Supporting Role |
| Phindile Gwala | Nompilo Nkosi | Supporting Role |
| Raphael Griffiths | Vusi Nkosi | Leading Role |
| Buhle Samuels | Matshidiso Mulaudzi | Leading Role |
| Vatiswa Ndara | Modiehi Motsamai | Supporting Role |
| Senzo Radebe | Sthembiso Radebe | Supporting Role |
| Melusi Yeni | Phenyo | Supporting Role |
| Zonke Mnchunu | Imani Motsamai | Leading Role |
| Nay Maps | Tshireletso | Supporting Role |
| Liteboho Molise | Tebogo Mukhwevho | Leading Role |

== Plot ==
The show is primarily set in Johannesburg and Venda. In Johannesburg, Thandaza Mokoena (Sindi Dlathu), James Motsamai (Dingaan Khumalo), Khakhathi Mulaudzi, Gugu Nkosi-Zikalala, Imani Nkosi, Hangwani Mukhwevho(Connie Sibiya), Rendani Mukhwevho (Innocentia Manchidi), their families and their colleagues deal with nepotism, drama and violence in the corporate world. In Venda, the Mukhwevho family leads the people of Thathe while there are cracks in their family. Thandaza left her business over to James the Qalabosha constructions.
