= Siyabonga Radebe =

South African actor and comedian

- Born: Siyabonga Radebe; 1 January 1984 (age 42); Durban, Kwa-Zulu Natal, South Africa
- Occupations: Actor, Singer, Writer, Stand-up comedian, Director
- Years active: 2004–present
- Spouse: Lerato Mvelase
- Children: 1

Siyabonga Radebe (born 1 January 1984) is a South African actor, singer, writer, stand-up comedian and director. He is best known for the roles in the television serials and soapies such as Home Affairs, Saints and Sinners and Ring of Lies.

== Personal life ==
Radebe was born on 1 January 1984 Durban, South Africa. He completed a National Diploma in Drama from the Durban University of Technology (DUT).

He was married to fellow actress Lerato Mvelase, but later separated in 2017. The couple has one daughter.

== Career ==
After completing is diploma at DUT, he joined with many theatre plays such as; Blacks Like Me, Cheap Show, Closer and Grin and Bear It. He made his acting debut in 2005, when he appeared in the television serial Home Affairs with the role "Benjy". In 2006, he played the role "Cassius" in the SABC1 drama serial A Place Called Home. The show became very popular, where Radebe played the role until 2009. In 2008, he joined with SABC1 mini-series uGugu no Andile and played the role "Bheki". In the same year, he acted in the ITV drama Wild at Heart and the SABC1 legal drama serial Sokhulu & Partners, both with supportive roles.

In 2009, he made the film debut with award-winning science fiction film District 9, where he played the role of "Obesandjo's 1st Lieutenant". Then in 2010, he joined with the e.tv soap opera Rhythm City with the role "Boboza". In the same year, Radebe acted in the SABC1 drama serial Intersexions with the role "Muzi". For that role, he won the Best Actor Award in TV Drama category at the 2012 South African Film and Television Awards (SAFTA). In the meantime, he was cast as "Xolani Mthembu", for the popular SABC1 soap opera Generations. In 2012, he got the opportunity to join with the live show Comedy Central Presents... Live at Parker's. In 2014, he acted in the drama film Between Friends. In 2015, he acted in Afrikaans film Sink, which was later selected for 40th Atlanta Film Festival. In 2016, he joined with the cast of Mzansi Magic television serial Saints and Sinners. In the serial, he played the role "Phakamani Makhoba", where he won the Best Actor Award in TV Drama category at 2016 SAFTAs. After that, he joined with the serial Ring of Lies and nominated for the Best Actor Award in the Telenovela category at the 2019 SAFTA.

As a singer, he released two popular solo tracks: "Maye" dedicated to the mother of his child and "Nkanyezi", dedicated to his daughter. In 2018, he released his first music album Release Therapy.

== Arrest ==
On 5 October 2019 at 15:30, Radebe's vehicle and another vehicle were involved in a collision at G Section in Ntuzuma. Due to collision, a passenger in one of the vehicles was injured. After that, he was arrested for allegedly driving drunk.

== Filmography ==
Year	Film	Role	Genre	Ref.
2005	Home Affairs	Benjy	TV series	
2006	A Place Called Home	Cassius	TV series	
2008	uGugu no Andile	Bheki	TV series	
2008	Sokhulu & Partners	Lucas	TV series	
2009	District 9	Obesandjo's Lieutenant	Film	
2010	Generations	Xolani Mthembu	TV series	
2010	Intersexions	Muzi	TV series	
2012	Comedy Central Presents... Live @ Parkers	Himself	TV series	
2012	Laugh Out Loud	Bab' Buthelezi	TV series	
2013	Rhythm City	Boboza	TV series	
2013	Single Guyz	Jacob	TV series	
2014	Saints and Sinners	Phakamani Makhoba	TV series	
2014	Ses'Top La	TJ Ngoma	TV series	
2014	Soul City	Kgopotso	TV series	
2014	Zaziwa	Himself	TV series	
2015	Sink	Home Affairs Officer	Film	
2015	Him, Her & the Guys	Joe Mthembu	TV series	
2015	It's Complicated	Thato	TV series	
2016	Doubt	Mlungisi Mweli	TV series	
2017	Change Down	Celebrity Guest	TV series	
2017	Ring of Lies	Gazini	TV series	
2019	Trackers	Paul Makholwa	TV series	
2022–present	Uzalo	Vikizitha Magwaza	TV series	
