= Zikhona Sodlaka =

South African actress and singer

- Born: 7 June 1985 (age 40); Mthatha, South Africa
- Education: Shepstone College
- Occupations: actress; singer; philanthropist
- Known for: Generations
- Notable work: Zikhona Sodlaka Foundation

Zikhona Sodlaka (born 7 June 1985 in Mthatha) is a South African actress best known for her starring roles in television series such as Shooting Stars, Rhythm City, Soul City, Intsika and Montana. Sodlaka once got nominated for the South African Film and Television Awards (SAFTA).

She is a prominent actress of South Africa in Tsha Tsha, Igazi, Generations. and the film, The Two of Us and Mandela: Long Walk to Freedom.

She was a participant on the first season of The Masked Singer South Africa as The Fox and was unmasked on 19 August 2023. In 2023 she also received a National Film & Television Award for her performance on Showmax series The Wife.

== Early life ==
Sodlaka was born in Mthatha in the Eastern Cape, she grew up in KwaZulu-Natal. She attended school at Excelsior SSS and left in grade 9. She received the rest of her schooling at Warriors Rust high school in Margate.

She went to Shepstone College where she did her tertiary education and studied Business Admin. She got her diploma and proceeded to Johannesburg and registered as an IT Student and did Computer Programming at Havtec before moving on to pursue her passion for art.

== Filmography ==
=== Television ===
- After 9 (2007-2013)
- Rhythm City (2007)
- Skeem Saam (2011)
- Igazi (2016) as Schotho
- The Wife (2021 - 2022) as Mandisa
- Gqeberha: The Empire (2023) as Bulelwa Mxenge
- Bad Influencer (2025) as Thandz

=== film ===
- Mandela: Long Walk to Freedom (2013)
- Thina sobabili:The two of us (2014)
- Inhliziyo Yethu (2017)
- Mister Bob (2011)

== Awards and nominations ==
=== Royalty Soapie Awards ===
Year	Nominee / work	Award	Result	Ref.
2024		Outstanding Lead Actress	Won	

=== South Africa Film and Television Awards ===
Year	Nominee / work	Award	Result	Ref.
2024	Herself	Best Actress in a Telenovela	Won	
