= Tropika Island of Treasure =

- Logo for the 5th season of Tropika Island of Treasure
- Genre: Reality competition
- Created by: Samantha Moon
- Directed by: Graeme Moon (season 1, 2 and 5), Steven Warriner (season 3 and 4), Samantha Moon (season 5)
- Presented by: DJ Fresh (season 2-5), Natalie Becker (season 2), Lala Hirayama (season 3), Nicole Flint (season 4) Rosina Casserly (season 5), Katlego Maboe (season 9-10)
- Country of origin: South Africa
- Original language: English
- No. of seasons: 10

Production
- Executive producer: Samantha Moon
- Production locations: Seychelles (season 10),Curaçao (season 9), Maldives (season 8), Seychelles (season 7), Mauritius (season 6), Jamaica (season 5), Mexico (season 4), Thailand (season 3), Zanzibar (season 2), Mauritius (season 1)
- Production company: Stimulii Licensing South Africa

Original release
- Network: e.tv (seasons 1–4); SABC 1 (seasons 5–6); SABC 3 (seasons 7–present)

Tropika Island of Treasure is a South African reality competition television series. The show features an equal number of South African celebrities and public contestants competing in a luxurious, paradise-island location for a cash prize. Each episode the players compete in an Island Game. Each week's Island Game winner listens to the other players pleas to stay on the island, and they alone have the power to decide who stays and who goes by uttering the words "Pack your bags and get off my Island". The final Island Game winner receives a prize of R1 million. The format is owned and produced by Stimulii Licensing and broadcast on SABC3. Currently it is presented by Zanele Potelwa in Zanzibar.

== Seasons ==
As of 2023 there have been ten seasons of the show:

- Tropika Island of Treasure 1 took place in Mauritius in 2008. The competition featured 10 celebrities, coupled with ten public contestants who competed as teams. The competition lasted for 7 days and was broadcast as webisodes on YouTube. There were no eliminations and all players remained at the location throughout the competition. The winning team was made up of celebrity, and reality star of South Africa Popstars Pam Andrews, and public contestant Owen Madondo. Each received R500,000.
- Tropika Island of Treasure 2 took place in Zanzibar in October 2009. The competition ran in exactly the same way as season 1 with 10 celebrities, coupled with ten public contestants who competed as teams. The competition lasted for 7 days and was broadcast in 8 half-hour episodes on e.tv from October to December 2009. The winning team included Shashi Naidoo and her partner, Cuan Bergman. Each received R500,000.
- Tropika Island of Treasure 3 took place in Phuket, Thailand in October 2010. For the third season, the competition format changed significantly for this series. Reducing the contestant total to 14, the season saw the 7 celebrities and 7 public contestants compete as individuals instead of teams. It was also the first season to feature the plead session, and the elimination ceremony. The competition lasted for 10 days and was broadcast in 8 half-hour episodes on e.tv from February to April 2011. The winner was rapper J.R. who received R1,000,000. The first episode aired on 24 February 2011.
- Tropika Island of Treasure 4 took place in Riviera Maya, Mexico, in October 2011, following the new format in its entirety. The competition lasted for 12 days and was broadcast in 8 half-hour episodes on e.tv from February to April 2012. The winner was public contestant Nolan Jonathan who received R1,000,000. Season 4 was almost derailed when Hurricane Rina nearly halted filming on location
- Tropika Island of Treasure 5 took place in Jamaica in November 2012. The show extended its duration to an hour, and changed broadcasters to the countries largest SABC1. The competition lasted for 14 days and was broadcast in 10 hour-long episodes from February to April 2013. Reeva Steenkamp, a celebrity contestant on season 5, was killed by her boyfriend Oscar Pistorius two days before the first episode was broadcast. The final episode of Season 5 was broadcast in April 2013.

== List of winners ==
The list of winners per season of Tropika Island of Treasure:

Season 1: Pam Andrews and Owen Madondo

Season 2: Shashi Naidoo and Cuan Bergman

Season 3: JR Bogopa

Season 4: Nolan Jonathan

Season 5: Da L.E.S.

Season 6: Thando Hlophe

Season 7: Anga Makubalo and Bonginkosi Ndima

Season 8: Brendan Peyper and Lisanne Lazarus

Season 9: Nadia Jaftha and Trevor Lagerway

Season 10: Karlien van Jaarsveld and Ruan Scheepers

Season 11: Hungani Ndlovu and Dimakatso Calica

== See also ==
- Shashi Naidoo, TV presenter and model, celebrity winner of season 2.
- Reeva Steenkamp, a season 5 celebrity who was killed two days prior to the season debut.
