= Richard Lukunku =

Congolese-South African actor

Richard Kitenge Lukunku
- Born: Richard Kitenge Lukunku; May 29, 1986 (age 40); Republic of Congo
- Education: AFDA
- Occupation: Actor
- Years active: 2010–present
- Notable work: Ashes to Ashes (South African TV series); Inkaba; Mshika-shika

Richard Lukunku (born 29 May 1986) is a Congolese–South African actor who played the character of Joshua on Black Sails.

== Early life ==
Lukunku moved to South Africa with his family as a child. He cultivated an early interest in performance art and went on to earn a Bachelor of Arts in Live Performance from AFDA, The School for the Creative Economy, in Johannesburg. Lukunku speaks six languages—English, Afrikaans, Setswana, Zulu, French and Swahili—which has helped him take on a diverse range of roles.

== Career ==
=== 2010–2013: Early South African television ===
Lukunku made his on-screen debut in the crime drama Inkaba, followed by a starring role as Detective Phaka in Mshika-shika (2012). He appeared in the telenovela Ashes to Ashes, earning a SAFTA nomination for Best Actor in a TV Soap/Telenovela in 2016.

=== 2014–2017: International break and feature films ===
In 2014, he joined the main cast of the Starz series Black Sails as Joshua, a role he held for two seasons. He went on to portray Patrice Lumumba in the Michael Bay-produced film The Siege of Jadotville (2016) and featured in the romantic comedy Happiness Is a Four-letter Word (2016) and its 2020 sequel. His film credits also include The Lucky Specials (2017).

=== 2018–present: Leading roles and fantasy epics ===
Back in South Africa, Lukunku landed a leading part on the long-running SABC3 drama Isidingo (2023–present). In 2022 he starred as Senator Jabari in Showmax’s fantasy epic Blood Psalms, which earned multiple award nominations on the continent. He appeared in the television shows "The Looming Tower" and "The Girl from St. Agnes", "Blood Plasms" and "Professionals".

== Personal life ==
Lukunku is married to actress and director Nozipho Nkelemba; the couple have two children. In 2023, the two were reported to have been separated. His multilingual fluency (six languages) is frequently highlighted in interviews as key to his versatility.

== Filmography ==
=== Television ===
- Inkaba
- Mshika-shika
- Ashes to Ashes
- The Mirage of Life
- The Quest
- Rhythm City
- Isidingo
- The road
- Trueuground
- The Girl from St. Agnes
- Strike Back
- Flight of the Stocks
- Black Sails

=== Films ===
- Happiness is a Four-Letter Word
- Blink
- Night Drive
- History of America
- Superhelde
- Invisible Children
- Skyf the Movie
- Mister BOB
- Thina Sobabili
- The Siege of Jadotville
- Black Sails
- Zama Zama

== Awards and nominations ==
- Richard Lukunku was nominated for a Golden Horn Award in 2013
- Nominated for Best supporting Actor in 2016
- African Movie Academy Awards (AMAA) in 2018.
