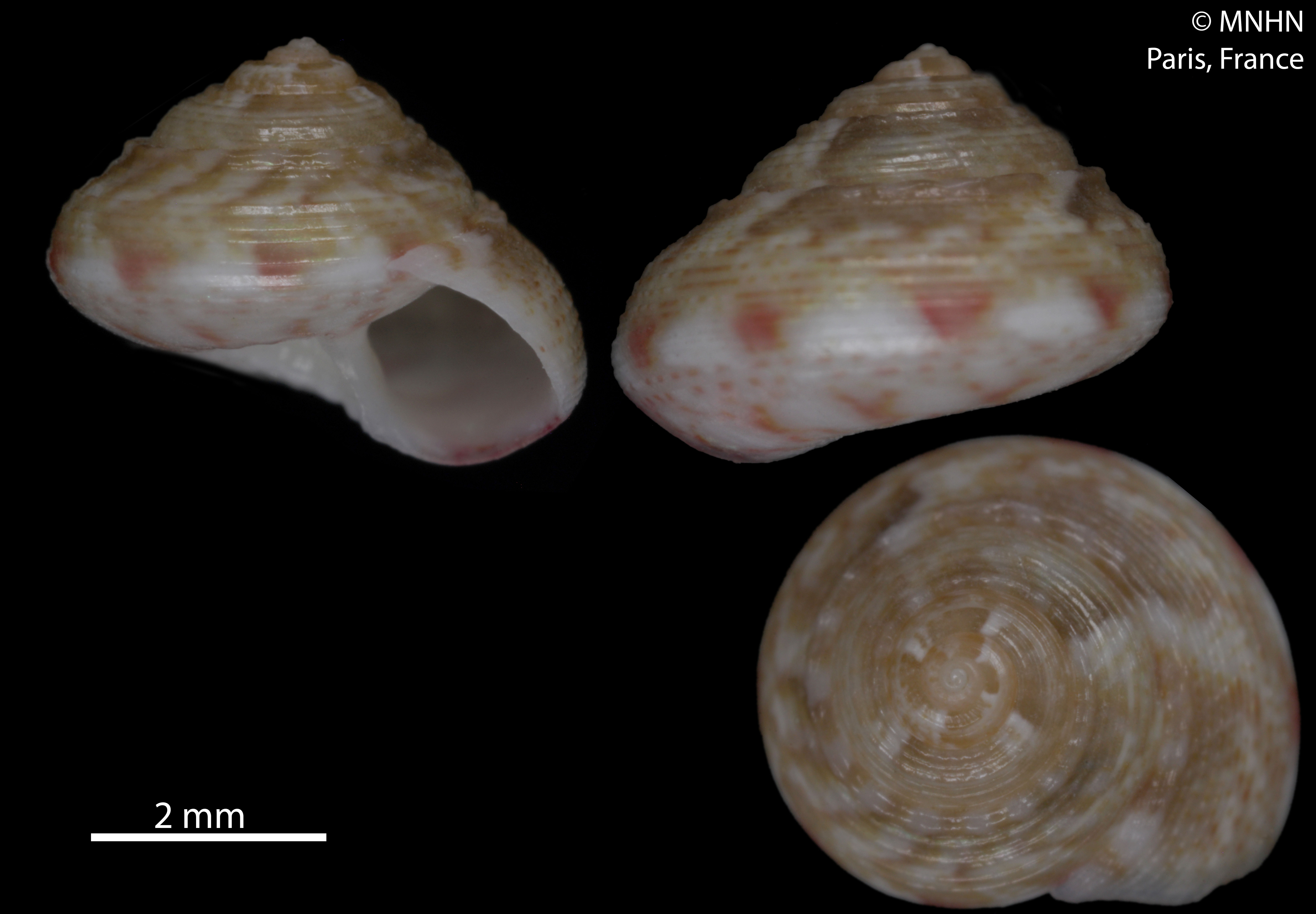
- Shell of Inkaba tonga

Scientific classification
- Kingdom: Animalia
- Phylum: Mollusca
- Class: Gastropoda
- Subclass: Vetigastropoda
- Order: Trochida
- Superfamily: Trochoidea
- Family: Trochidae
- Genus: Inkaba; Herbert, 1992

Type species
- Inkaba tonga Herbert, D.G., 1992

= Inkaba =

Genus of gastropods

Inkaba is a genus of sea snails, marine gastropod mollusks in the family Trochidae, the top snails.

== Species ==
Species within the genus Inkaba include:

- Inkaba tonga Herbert, 1992
