= Gabriel Temudzani =

South African actor and TV presenter

- Born: 10 February 1980 (age 46); Limpopo, South Africa
- Occupations: actor; Tv presenter
- Years active: 2000-present
- Known for: Muvhango
- Spouse(s): m. 2013 Refilwe Temudzani, m.2020 Bongiwe Matsebula

Gabriel Temudzani (born 10 February 1980) is a South African actor and TV presenter.

He is known for his role of Chief Vhafuwi Azwindini since 2000, on the TV soap opera Muvhango aired on SABC 2, on which he has been an actor since 2000 until its conclusion in 2025.

== Early life ==
Temudzani was born in 1980 and bred in Tshivhilidulu in the Nzhelele area, in Venda.

== Career ==
In 1995, he began his acting career and made his screen acting debut in 2000.

He acted in the feature film A Diamond and Destiny in 2003, about the discovery of gold and diamond in Kimberly. In 2009, he landed a lead role in the feature film Night Drive.

In theatre he has appeared in the show The Dog and The Night of Horror, for which he won a Vita award.

He was a lead actor on Muvhango and presents the magazine show La Famila, which also airs on SABC2.He is the presenter on La Familia from Shandukani Nesengani, starting with Season 3 in 2010.

== Personal life ==
Gabriel married Refilwe Temudzani in 2013 and Bongiwe Matsebula in 2020.

== Filmography ==
=== Television ===
Year	Title	Role	Notes
2000 - 2025	Muvhango	Chief Vhafuwi Azwindini Mukwevho	Lead role
2010	La Familiar	Himself	

=== film ===
Year	Title	Role	Note
	The Dog and The Night of Horror	Himself	
2003	A Diamond and Destiny		
2009	Night Drive		lead role

== Awards and nominations ==
- He won vita awards for his role on The Dog and The Night of Horror.
