= Sibusiso Hadebe =

South African soccer player (born 1987)

Personal information
- Full name: Sibusiso Edward Hadebe
- Date of birth: 14 May 1987 (age 39)
- Place of birth: Standerton, South Africa
- Height: 1.66 m (5 ft 5 1/2 in)
- Position: Left winger

Youth career
- 2000–2001: Ajax Cape Town
- 2001–2004: Pretoria University

Senior career*
Years	Team	Apps	(Gls)
2004–2008	Jomo Cosmos		
2008–2009	Thanda Royal Zulu		
2009–2012	AmaZulu	52	(5)
2012–2013	Golden Arrows	26	(1)
2013–2015	Platinum Stars	17	(0)
2016	AmaZulu	4	(0)
2016–2017	Stellenbosch	17	(0)
- * Club domestic league appearances and goals as of 15 November 2022

Sibusiso Edward Hadebe (born 14 May 1987) is a South African professional soccer player who plays for Platinum Stars as a left winger.

== Career ==
Born in Standerton, he formerly played for Ajax Cape Town, Pretoria University, Jomo Cosmos and AmaZulu.
