= Wanda Zuma =

South African actor and scripwriter

- Born: Wanda Blaq Zuma; 7 September 1991 (age 34); Durban, KwaZulu-Natal, South Africa
- Education: Creative Arts College; Grosvenor Boys High School
- Occupations: Actor; scriptwriter; film director
- Years active: 2018–present
- Notable work: House of Zwide
- Spouse: Shalate Sekhabi (m. 2026)
- Relatives: Aubrey Sekhabi (father in-law)

Wanda Blaq Zuma (born 7 September 1991) is a South African actor, scripwriter and film director. He is best known for his starring role as Nkosi Zwide on e.tv telenovela House of Zwide (2021–2026) and Mzansi Magic cultural television series Shaka iLembe (2023–2024) as Mawewe.

== Early life ==
Zuma was born on 7 September 1991, in Durban, KwaZulu Natal, South Africa. He attended Grosvenor Boys' High School where he obtained his matric in 2009 and studied drama at Creative Arts College, graduated in 2014. He furthered his acting formal training from the South African Film Institute and The Playhouse Company.

== Career ==
Zuma began his acting career in theatres. He made his first television debut in 2018, where he appeared in SABC 1 drama series Uzalo as a hitman. He made his appearance in the television films Love and Maskandi and Young Adults, which were part of SABC1's NFVF Youth Films initiative. In 2019, he played the recurring role in Mzansi Magic short series EHostela alongside Wiseman Mncube. He also played the role of Mthunzi in Imbewu: The Seed. By 2020, he played the role of Detective Mthaka on the final season of Isibaya.

In 2021, he played the lead role on fashion industry e.tv telenovela House of Zwide as Nkosi Zwide, the son of fashion designer "Funani Zwide" and "Faith Zwide". In 2023, he bagged the starring role on Zulu portrayal history movie Shaka iLembe as Mawewe. He appeared as Thapelo in Netflix drama series How to Ruin Love: The Proposal aired in 2024. By 2025, he played the role of Patrick in Showmax Kites theatre series and also playing the season 2 of Shaka iLembe.

== Personal life ==
In May 2026, Zuma married actress and singer Shalate Sekhabi in traditional umembeso wedding surrounded by family and close friends.

== Filmography ==
Year	Film	Role	
2018	Uzalo	Hitman	Recurring role
2018	EHostela	Himself	Recurring role, season 1
2019	Imbewu: The Seed	Mthunzi	Supporting role
2020	Isibaya	Detective Mtho	Recurring role
2021–2026	House of Zwide	Nkosi Zwide	Lead role
2023–2025	Shaka iLembe	Mawewe	Starring role, season 1 & 2
2024	How to Ruin Love: The Proposal	Thapelo	Starring role
2025	Kites	Patrick	Main role

== Awards and nominations ==
Year	Association	Category	Nominated works	Result	Ref.
2023	South African Film & Television Awards	Best Supporting Actor	As Nkosi in House of Zwide	Won	
2023	National Film and TV Awards	Best Supporting Actor	As Nkosi in House of Zwide	Won	
