= Mncube =

Mncube is a South African surname. Notable people with the surname include:

- Busisiwe Mncube, South African politician
- Ntando Mncube (born 1986), South African actor, singer, and dancer
- Themba Mncube, the professional name of Brian Ntuli (born 1991), South African filmmaker and actor
- Vusimuzi Mncube (born 1993), South African soccer player
- Wiseman Mncube (born 1990), South African actor, playwright, singer, and director

== See also ==
- Nomusa Dube-Ncube, South African politician and diplomat
