= Sekhabi =

Sekhabi is a surname. Notable people with the surname include:

- Aubrey Sekhabi (fl. 1992–present), South African playwright and director
- Shalate Sekhabi (born 2000), South African actress and singer
