= Bheki Sibiya =

South African actor and director

- Born: Bheki Sibiya; 1977 (age 48–49); Kwa-Zulu Natal, South Africa
- Education: Durban University of Technology; AFDA, The School for the Creative Economy
- Occupations: Actor, Producer, Director, Cinematographer
- Years active: 1999–present

Bheki Sibiya (born 1973) is a South African actor, producer, director, and cinematographer. He is best known for the roles in the television serials such as Muvhango, eHostela and Durban Gen.

== Personal life ==
Bheki Sibiya was born in 1973 in Kwa-Zulu Natal, South Africa. In 1997, he completed a diploma in Speech and Drama from Durban University of Technology. Then he completed a film course at AFDA, The School for the Creative Economy (AFDA).

== Career ==
He started career as a production assistant on several television dramas. In the meantime, he co-directed theater productions as well as produced and directed the documentaries. In 1999, he appeared in the SABC2 soap opera Muvhango with the role "Bheki Sotobe". In 2005, he made a guest appearance in the television sitcom Sorted. Then in 2006, he joined with the police procedural drama series Zero Tolerance and played the role "Fayo".

In 2009, he directed the short film Father Christmas Doesn’t Come Here. The short later won the Best Narrative Short Award at the 2010 Tribeca Film Festival. In 2011, he worked as the assistant art director of the film Winnie Mandela (2011). Then in 2015 he was the cinematographer of the film Legend Within.

However, his first lead role in television came through the Mzansi Magic drama serial eHostela in 2019. In that serial, he played the role "Mancinza". After that success, he played the role "Khombindlela" in the Mzansi Magic serial Ifalakhe. Later in the same year, he appeared in the season two of Mzansi Magic drama, supernatural serial The Herd and season 5 of popular SABC1 telenovela Uzalo. In 2020, he joined with the regular cast of e.tv medical drama serial Durban Gen with the role "Dr Ndlovu". Then in 2021, he played the role "Bhodloza" in the Mzansi Magic telenovela DiepCity. He also nominated at the 2020 DStv Mzansi Viewers' Choice Awards, under the "Favorite Actor" category.

Apart from acting, he is a businessman who is one of the co-owners of the production company called "Sobalili Productions". Through the company, he produced any short films and documentaries. Later he produced the e.tv anthology serial eKasi: Our Stories.

== Filmography ==
Year	Title	Role
2005	Sorted	Guest role
2006	Zero Tolerance	Fayo
	Muvhango	Bheki Sotobe
2019	EHostela	Mancinza
2019	Ifalakhe	Khombindlela
2019	The Herd	Smangaliso
2019	Uzalo	Sfiso
2020	Durban Gen	Dr Ndlovu
2023	Isitha the enemy	Solly
