= Zuluboy =

South African Actor and Musician

ZuluBoy
- Born: Mxolisi Mgingqeni Majozi; 19 May 1976 (age 50); Ntuzuma, KwaZulu-Natal, South Africa
- Origin: Durban, South Africa
- Genres: Hip hop; Maskandi
- Occupations: Rapper; record producer; singer-songwriter; actor
- Years active: 2006–present
- Labels: Universal Music Group, Gallo Record Company, CCP Record Company, Native Rhythms

Mxolisi Mgingqeni Majozi (born 19 May 1976), also known as Zuluboy, is a South African actor and musician from Ntuzuma, KwaZulu-Natal, South Africa. He has worked with legendary South African hip hop artists, most of whom he drew inspiration from such as PRO.

== Career ==
His breakthrough song was "Nomalanga" from the album Inqolobane, it was released in 2008. He went on to win the Best Rapper Award at the 2008 Metro FM awards.

At the 2009 MTV Africa Music Awards he was nominated for Best Hip Hop.

=== Acting and television career ===
Mxolisi has had a successful career as an actor and television host. From 2012 to 2016 he hosted the SABC 1 variety show and Fan Base, across four seasons. Zuluboy appeared in the first season of the SABC 1 drama series InterSEXions. He played the role of Big Boy Gumede on etv's hit series Gold Diggers. He was seen on the South African show Uzalo from season 4-6 playing a role of Last number and is currently on Durban Gen as MacGyver.

=== Radio ===
He also worked as a Dj on the largest radio station in Africa, Ukhozi FM. He was released from Ukhozi FM after having contractual disputes with the station.

== Discography ==
=== Studio albums ===
- Zivile (2008)
- Inqolobane (2008)
- Masihambisane (2009)
- Igoda (2009)
- Crisis Management (2012)
- Sghubhu Sa Mampela (2012)
- AM-PM Producers Edition (2014)

== Filmography ==
Year	Title	Role	Notes	seasons
2012-2016	Fan Base	Host		1-4
	Gold Diggers	Big Boy Gumede		1-2
	Room 9	Zombie Bandit		1
	InterSEXions	Vukani		1
	Soul City	Zakes		9
	Mshika-Shika	Scarra		1
2020-2021	Uzalo	Last Number		4-6
2020-2021	Durban Gen	MacGayver		1-2
