= Ntando Mncube =

South African actor

- Born: Ntando Menzi Mncube; 4 November 1986 (age 39); Ulundi, South Africa
- Occupations: Actor; Singer; Dancer
- Years active: 2008–present
- Children: 2
- Relatives: Omega Mncube (brother)

Ntando Menzi Mncube (born 4 November 1986) is a South African actor, singer and dancer. He is best known for his roles in television serials such as Umlilo, Lockdown, Side Dish, Ifalakhe, Durban Gen, Shaka Ilembe, Isifiso and Uzalo (season 10).

== Personal life ==
Mncube was born on 4 November 1986 in Ulundi, North of KwaZulu-Natal, South Africa, into a family with four siblings. He graduated with a National Diploma in Drama and Production Studies from the Durban University of Technology (DUT) in 2008. His two younger brothers Wiseman Mncube and Omega are also popular actors. Wiseman has appeared in serials such as Uzalo, Gold Diggers, and EHostela, whereas Omega played the popular role "Phelelani" in Uzalo. He is a father of two children.

== Career ==
During and after his time at DUT, he performed in many theatre productions, such as Man of La Mancha, Jimbo and Spice 'n Stuff, No Tears, Let My People Go, Animal Farm, Peter Pan and Robin Hood.

In 2013, he made his television debut with the SABC1 drama series Intersexions, playing the role of "Suave Guy". He then made a guest-starring role as "Viro" in the e.tv drama anthology serial eKasi: Our Stories, which aired in 2014. In the same year, he got the opportunity to appear in the Mzansi Magic serial Saints and Sinners with the role "MUC 1" and in the SABC1 drama Kowethu with the role "Mr Mahlangu". In December 2015, he featured in the M-Net film The Ring, produced for the 2015 Magic in Motion Academy interns. In 2016, he joined the third season of the e.tv family drama series Umlilo, playing the role of "Thulane".

In 2017, Mncube played the role "Senzo" in the Mzansi Magic prison drama Lockdown and continued in a recurring role for the second season of the serial in late 2017. Following that success, he joined the third season of the SABC2 sitcom Abo Mzala in 2018, playing the role of "Bonginkosi". In that year, he starred in his first television lead role in the SABC1 miniseries Side Dish, where he played "Apollo". In 2019, he featured in the Mzansi Magic period drama Ifalakhe as "Bhekile". Then in 2020, he joined the recurring cast of the e.tv medical drama series Durban Gen, playing "Sibusiso Dlamini".

== Filmography ==
Year	Film	Role	Genre	Ref.
2013	Intersexions	Suave Guy	TV series	
2014	eKasi: Our Stories	Viro	TV series	
2014	Kowethu	Mr Mahlangu	TV series	
2014	Saints and Sinners	MUC 1	TV series	
2016	Umlilo	Thulane	TV series	
2017	Lockdown	Senzo	TV series	
2018	Abo Mzala	Bonginkosi	TV series	
2018	Side Dish	Apollo	TV series	
2019	Ifalakhe	Bhekile	TV series	
2020	Durban Gen	Sibusiso Dlamini	TV series	
2022	The Wife	Bafo	Drama	
2023	Shaka iLembe S1		Drama	
2024 -	Uzalo	Pastor Sakhile	Telenovela	
2026 -	Egagasini	Jacob "Boy Boy"	Telenovela	
