= Lungelo Mpangase =

South African actress

- Born: Lungelo Mpangase; 28 September 1995 (age 30)
- Occupations: Actress; model; influencer
- Years active: 2017–present
- Website: www.lungelompangase.com

Lungelo Mpangase is a South African actress, model and influencer. She is best known for her debut lead role as Khethiwe on the Mzansi Magic drama series eHostela and as Ntokozo in the Mzansi Magic series Mzali Wam.

== Career ==
Her first big lead role was as Khethiwe, a young woman who aspires to become a maskandi star, in the Mzansi Magic drama series eHostela.

She then appeared in an Mzansi original film Themba Lam, which was made by graduates of M-Net's Magic in Motion Academy and first aired on Mzansi Magic on 15 June 2019. In that same year she was featured in the film Idlozi which aired on Mzansi Magic.

In 2021, she landed another lead role as Ntokozo, a graduate looking for work, in the Mzansi Magic drama series Mzali Wam. In that same year, she also hosted a bursary competition on her social media platforms. The competition was not only aimed at assisting students with tuition but was to also encourage aspiring actors.

== Personal life ==
In 2019, Mpangase had a near-death experience when she was involved in a car accident that left her with an injured spine that had her off work for a couple of months, but she eventually recovered.

== Controversy ==
In May 2021, she was allegedly physically attacked by a fellow actress on set, that is; on her new movie in Vosloorus, Gauteng.

== Filmography ==
=== Television ===
Year	Title	Role	Notes
2020	eHostela	Khethiwe	Lead Role
2021	Mzali Wam	Ntokozo	Lead Role
2023	Nikiwe	Nikiwe Radebe	Lead Role

=== Film ===
Year	Title	Role	Notes
2019	Themba Lam	Herself	Television Film
2019	Idlozi	Herself	Television Film

== Awards and nominations ==
Year	Award ceremony	Prize	Result
2019	Simon Mabhunu Sabela Film and Television Awards	Best supporting actress	Nominated
