= Duduzile =

Duduzile (masculine: Duduzane) is a feminine given name, derived from the Nguni word duduza, meaning "to comfort." A shortened familiar version is Dudu. Notable people with the name include:

- Duduzile Manana, South African politician
- Duduzile Ngcobo (born 1967), South African actress
- Duduzile Sibiya (born 1957), South African politician
- Duduzile Zuma-Sambudla (born 1982), South African politician
