= Lihle Dhlomo =

South African actress

- Born: Lihle Dhlomo; 1990 (age 34–35); Gauteng, South Africa
- Occupation(s): Actress, writer, producer
- Years active: 2005–present

Lihle Dhlomo (born 1990) is a South African actress. She is best known for her roles in the films and television series: Seriously Single, The Harvesters, Between Friends: Ithala and HG's Shadow. Apart from acting, she is also a voice-over artist, dancer, and training singer.

== Personal life ==
She was born in 1990 in Gauteng, South Africa.

== Career ==
In 2011, she toured several schools with the film Nothing But The Truth directed by Musa Dlamini. She later starred in the award-winning theater production Abnormal Loads directed by Neil Coppen. The play was later performed in places such as Grahamstown and Hilton Arts Festival, the Market Theatre, and the Playhouse. She appeared in the musical revue It's All Fright by Me directed by Themi Venturas. In 2012, she performed in the play Wizard of OZ as a dancer which was directed by Darren King. In 2012, Dhlomo was awarded for the Best Newcomer at the Durban Mercury Theatre Award for her performances in the stage. Then in 2013, she was nominated at the Naledi Theatre Awards in the Best Performance by an Actress in a Supporting Role.

In August 2020, she starred in the comedy film Seriously Single co-directed by Katleho Ramaphakela and Rethabile Ramaphakela. It was released on 31 July 2020, on Netflix.

She became famous with her role as 'Dr Precious' in the popular television series Durban Gen which was premiered in October 2020. In the serial, she is an obstetrician-gynaecologist married to Head of Surgery and womaniser Dr.Thabo Dlamini, played by Meshack Mavuso.

== Filmography ==
Year	Film	Role	Genre	Ref.
2014	Between Friends: Ithala	Linda	Film	
2017	HG's Shadow	The Woman	Short film	
2018	The Harvesters	Production manager	Film	
2020	Seriously Single	Pam	Film	
2020	Durban Gen	Dr Precious	TV series	
