= Sthandwa Nzuza =

South African actress

- Born: Sthandwa Nzuza; 9 February 1987 (age 39); KwaZulu-Natal, South Africa
- Other names: "Stha"
- Education: Cambridge College
- Alma mater: Durban University of Technology
- Occupations: Actress, Radio DJ artist and a hoster
- Years active: 2009–present
- Spouse: divorced

Sthandwa Nzuza (born 9 February 1987) is a South African actress and radio DJ artist. She is best known for the roles in the television serials such as; Imbeleko, Uzalo and Ifalakhe, Durban Gen and Amalanga Awafani.

== Personal life ==
Nzuza was born on 9 February 1987 in Inanda township in the KwaZulu-Natal, South Africa. She completed her high school education in 2002 from Cambridge College.

She is married to Philani Gama, a Durban pastor since 2017. In 2020, she filed a case against the husband allegedly laid charges of assault against him.

== Career ==
In 2014, she appeared as a featured guest in the SABC1 music talk show Zaziwa. In 2017 she starred in the Mzansi Magic telefilm Imbeleko. In 2019, she appeared in the two television serials: Friendship, and Mzansi Magic drama series eHostela with recurring roles. In 2017, she made the recurring role of "Innocentia" on the SABC1 soap opera Uzalo. The role became very popular and she continued to play the role in both third and fourth seasons. After that success, Sthandwa made her first television lead role as "Nomvula" in the Mzansi Magic drama serial Ifalakhe in 2019.

Other than these leading roles, she also made guest starring role in the television series and sitcoms such as; Mtunzini.com, My Perfect Family and Single Galz. In 2020, she joined with the serial Durban Gen with the role "Dr Zandile Mkhize".

Apart from acting, she is also a DJ working for the radio station "Ukhozi FM".

== Filmography ==
Year	Series	Role	Genre	Ref.
2009	Mtunzini.com	Bubu	TV series	
2013	My Perfect Family	guest role	TV series	
2013	Zaziwa	Herself	TV series	
2014	Single Galz	Lethu	TV series	
2017	Uzalo	Innocentia	TV series	
2019	EHostela	Friendship	TV series	
2019	Ifalakhe	Nomvula	TV series	
2020–2023	Durban Gen	Dr Zandile Mkhize	TV series	
2025 - Present ,	Amalanga Awafani	Ntombifuthi Dube	TV Series	
