= Nombulelo Mhlongo =

South African actress and Teacher

- Born: Nombulelo Mhlongo; 9 May 1992 (age 34); KwaZulu-Natal, South Africa
- Other name: Nonamandell
- Education: American Academy of Dramatic Arts
- Occupations: Actress, Classical singer, Teacher, Writer, Choreographer, Businesswoman
- Years active: 2015–present
- Children: 1

Nombulelo Mhlongo (born 9 May 1992) is a South African actress, classical singer, teacher, and writer. She is best known for the roles in the television serials such as Durban Gen and Uzalo. Apart from that, she is also a choreographer and a businesswoman. She is also a South African Tick tocker.

== Personal life ==
Nombulelo Mhlongo was born on 9 May 1992 in Pongola, KwaZulu-Natal, South Africa. She completed a degree in dramatic arts from the American Academy of Dramatic Arts.

She is a mother of one daughter.

== Career ==
She started acting career with performances in the stage plays. Meanwhile, she performed in the stage play Nothing But The Truth produced by John Kani with the role "Mandisa". Her first major role in television came through the soap opera Skeem Saam where she played the role "Cassandra Masemola". After that role, she took a break from television career. Then she joined with the Market Theatre and hosted acting classes. During his period, she engaged in the project "Pan African Arts Space", and taught writing, reading, music and drama for youngsters.

She then joined with Stained Glass Productions for many serials. In 2018, she acted in the television serials Ifalakhe. In 2019, she joined with the cast of SABC1 soap opera Uzalo with the role "Nomncebo". In 2020, she joined with the e.tv medical drama telenovela Durban Gen in the main cast and played the role "Nurse Sne Mtshali". In 2021, she was nominated for the Most Promising Actress Award at the Scream African Women Awards.

== Filmography ==
Year	Film	Role	Genre	Ref.
	Skeem Saam	Cassandra Masemola	TV series	
	Ifalakhe		TV series	
2019	Uzalo	Nomncebo	TV series	
2020	Durban Gen	Nurse Sne Mtshali	TV series	
