= Wiseman Mncube =

South African actor and director

- Born: Wiseman Mncube; 29 May 1990 (age 36); Durban, South Africa
- Education: Durban University of Technology
- Occupations: Actor, Playwright, Director, Singer
- Years active: 2011–present
- Height: 5 ft 7 in (170 cm)
- Spouse: Nokubonga Ngobese (m. 2025)
- Children: 2
- Relatives: Ntando Mncube (brother); Omega Mncube (brother)

Wiseman Mncube (born 29 May 1990) is a South African actor, playwright, singer and director. He is best known for the roles in television serials, such as Gold Diggers, EHostela, Uzalo and Shaka Ilembe. In June 2024 he was nominated twice for Best Actor for his roles in Uzalo and Shaka llembe by the Simon Mabhunu Sabela Film and Television Awards.

== Personal life ==
Mncube was born on 29 May 1990 in Ulundi, KwaZulu Natal, South Africa in a family with five siblings. He completed his National Diploma in Drama from the Durban University of Technology (DUT) in 2011. His elder brother Ntando Mncube, who played the role "Bhekile" on the serial Ifalakhe. His younger brother Omega is also an actor, who played the popular role "Phelelani" on Uzalo.

His wife died in 2017, where he currently lives with his daughter, Lwandle. In February 2021, he welcomed another child, a son.

== Career ==
He started his acting career as a theatre actor during his life at DUT. Some of his notable theatre plays include; Nothing But the Truth, Horn of Sorrow, Meet Bro Six Two, Culture Clash, Amambazo The Musical, Have We Been Heard and Mashu the Musical. In November 2012, he wrote and directed the play The Weeping Candle. The play became critically acclaimed and Mncube won the awards for Best Production and Best Script at the isiGcawu Festival. In the same year, he won The Best Newcomer Award at the Mercury Theatre Awards as well as Best Actor at Musho Festival. Then he performed in the play Giving Birth to my Father and won the Standard Bank Ovation Award. In 2014, he wins three National Arts Festival (NAF) awards in Grahamstown. In 2015, he was selected as one of the directors of the Musho Festival.

In 2016, he made his television debut with the drama serial The Kingdom-UKhakhayi and played the role of "Mfanufikile". After gaining popularity, he joined with the e.tv telenovela Gold Diggers. In 2018, he acted in the TV Mini Series Liberty by playing the role "Reggie". In 2019, he appeared in the television serial EHostela and played the role "Jama". In 2020, he won the Best Actor Award in TV Drama category at the South African Film and Television Awards (SAFTA) for this role. In the same year, he won another award at the Mzansi Viewers Choice Awards.

Then he made the supportive role "Sibonelo" on the soap opera Uzalo. In mid 2019, he acted in the feature film The Turning Son with the role "Vusi Ndlovu" and then acted in the 2020 film Rage of a Lioness with the role "Siya".

Apart from acting, he is also a singer. He released the gqom song Pick & Choose along with Vukani Khoza.

== Filmography ==
Year	Film	Role	Genre	Ref.
2016	The Kingdom-UKhakhayi	Mfanufikile	TV series	
2016	Gold Diggers	Themba / Gus	TV series	
2016	Ring of Lies	Boxer 1	TV series	
2016	Mamello	Junior	TV series	
2016	Sokhulu & Partners	Bongani Mvelase	TV series	
2017	Ingozi	Sizwe Hlatshwayo	TV series	
2018	Liberty	Reggie	TV mini series	
2018	Generations	S'khalo	TV series	
2019-2024/02/28	Uzalo	Sibonelo	TV series	
2019	EHostela	Jama	TV series	
2019	The Turning Son	Vusi Ndlovu	Film	
2020	Rage of a Lioness	Siya	Film	
2022–2023	The Wife	Mqhele Zulu	Telenovela	
2023	Shaka Ilembe	Zwide	TV Series	
2023	Mandoza: Life Of Inkalakatha	Mandoza	TV Series	
2023–present	My Brother's Keeper	Nqubeko Mshengu	Telenovela	

== Singles ==
=== As lead artist ===
List of singles as lead artist, with selected chart positions and certifications, showing year released and album name
Title	Year	Peak chart positions	Certifications	Album
Title	Year	ZA	Certifications	Album
"Phuz'Ujabule" (featuring Mthuthu, Simphiwe Majozi)	2021	—		Non-album single
"Shona Le" (featuring Mthuthu, Em Soul)	2021	—		Non-album single
"Dedel' UMbali" (featuring Emsoul, Duncan)	2022	—		Non-album single
"Ngisho" (Emsoul, Mnqobi Yazo, Wiseman Mncube)	2022	—		Non-album single
"Mshoza Ibhoza" (Wiseman Mncube, Emza)	2023	—		Non-album single
"—" denotes a recording that did not chart or was not released in that territory.

== Awards and nominations ==
=== Simon Sabela KZN Film & TV Awards ===
Year	Nominee / work	Award	Result	Ref.
2024	Shaka iLembe	Best actor	Nominated	
2024	Uzalo	Best actor	Nominated	

=== South Africa Film and Television Awards ===
Year	Nominee / work	Award	Result	Ref.
2024	Himself	Best Supporting Actor in a TV Drama	Pending	

=== National Film and Television Awards ===
Year	Nominee / work	Award	Result	Ref.
2024	Himself	Best Actor in a TV Series 2024	Pending	
