= Lorcia Cooper =

South African actress and dancer

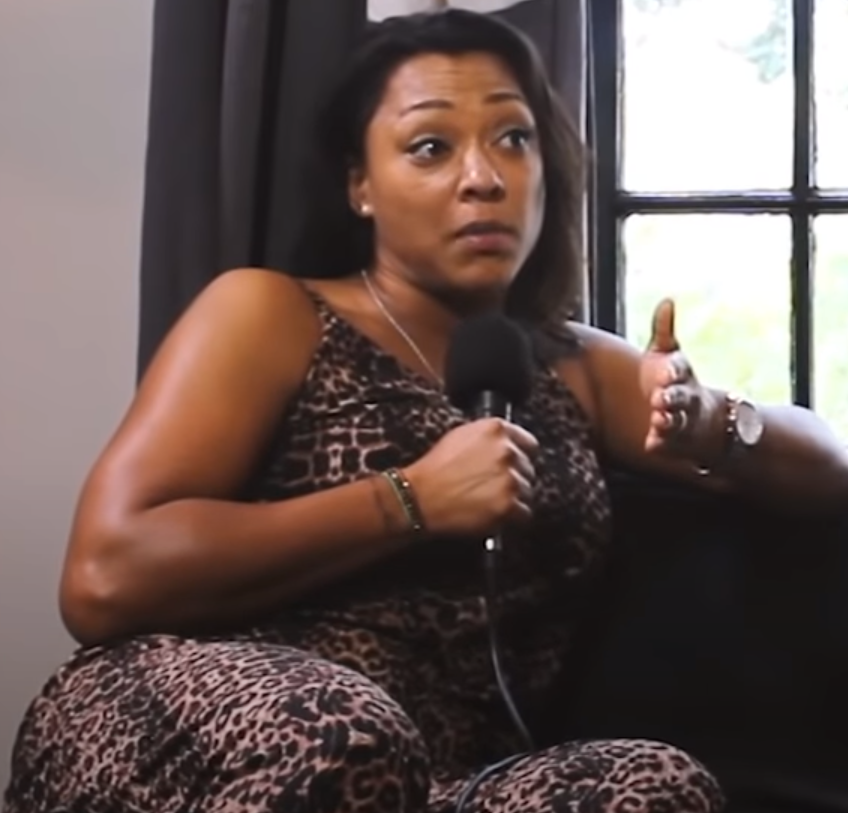
- Born: Lorcia Emmarslade Cooper; 9 November 1978 (age 47); Cape Town, South Africa
- Occupations: Actress; dancer; singer
- Years active: 1999–present
- Spouse: Mandla Khumalo
- Children: 2
- Awards: SAFTA AWARD for best Actress in a tv drama for Lockdown

Lorcia Emmarslade Cooper-Khumalo (née Cooper, born 9 November 1978) is a South African actress and dancer. She is best known for her roles in the popular television serials Backstage, Scandal!, Lockdown (2017-2020) and Red Ink (2024), and in films Hey Boy (2003) and Zulu Wedding (2017).

== Personal life ==
She was born on 9 November 1978 in Cape Town, South Africa. She is married to Mandla Khumalo. The couple has one daughter and one son.

In 2019, she suffered from swollen lymph nodes in her thyroid and had to take carbon dioxide injections to reduce the puffiness around her eyes.

== Career ==
When she was four years old, her parents enrolled her in a dancing class. At the age of five, she won her first competition in a provincial championships for both Ballroom and Latin American dances. Aged eight, she attended the Academy of Dance and studied dancing under choreographer Debbie Turner, who became her mentor. Later she joined the North West Arts Council's Dance Academy. When she was 19 years old, she won the FNB Vita Best Female Dancer Award.

She later joined SABC2 channel as a host of Travel Xplorer. During this period, she took on the lead role of Cindi in the film Hey Boy (2003) directed by Andre Odendaal.

In 2008, she was appointed as one of the judges in the dancing competition, Dans! Dans! Dans! aired on ykNET. That same year, she became the choreographer and judge of the reality competition, High School Musical: Spotlight South Africa aired on M-Net.

In 2017, Kumalo appeared in the first season of Mzansi Magic's crime drama series, Lockdown as Tyson, a lesbian inmate, a role she would play for the series' entire 4 season run. That same year, she played the supporting role of Marang in the romantic comedy Zulu Wedding, a film whose plot centers on the complexities of marrying into the Zulu royal family. In March 2019, she won the Best Supporting Actress Award at the SAFTAs for her role in Season 2 of Lockdown. She was again nominated in the same category the following year, but did not win. In September 2020, she appeared in the Mzansi drama series Housekeepers in the role Mkhonto.

In 2024, Kumalo appeared in the role of Detective Morapadi in the Showmax crime series Red Ink, an adaption of Angela Makholwa's novel of the same name.

In December 2024, Kumalo will appear in Neelan & Kevin, a South African comedy action film.

== Television roles ==
=== Actress ===
- 2000 - 2007— Backstage
- 2009-13 — Scandal as Erin
- 2017-20 — Lockdown as Tyson
- 2020 — Housekeepers as Mkhonto
- 2020 — Still Breathing as Lucille
- 2021-23 —The Estate as Jo Mohammed
- 2023 — Nikiwe as Mimmimi Cooper
- 2024 — Red Ink as

=== Host/Presenter/Guest ===
- #Karektas as a celebrity guest judge
- Change Down as a celebrity guest judge
- Eish! Saan as a celebrity prankster
- It's OK We're Family as herself
- The Bantu Hour as a guest
- The Comedy Central Roast as herself
- Host of Season 2 of Showville
- Presenter of Seasons 11 and 13 of The South African Film and Television Awards (SAFTA)

== Film roles ==
- 2003 — Hey Boy as Cindi
- 2017 — Zulu Wedding as Marang
- 2020 — New Material as Laylah (sequel to the 2012 Material)
- 2022 — Nandi as Jayan
- 2024 — Neelan & Kevin as Mercia Holby
