= Durban Gen =

South African medical drama television series

- Genre: Medical drama Telenovela
- Created by: Duma Ndlovu
- Written by: Thuli Zuma; Busisiwe Matonsi, Jacqueline Rainers, Sipho Tshapu, Nkosazana Zuma-Ncube, Bridgette Madiba, Pusetso Thibedi
- Directed by: Zuko Nodada, Meshack Mavuso, Sabelo Ndlovu
- Starring: Nelisiwe Sibiya; Tumelo Matlala; Mavuso Magabane; Fanele Ntuli; Bheki Mahlawe; Nombulelo Mhlongo; Tsidi Makitle; Yola Plaatjie; Thokozisa Ziqubu; Mthandeni Mbambo; Sibongokuhle Nkosi; Asande Dubazane; Joe Kazadi; Asavela Mqokiyana
- Country of origin: South Africa
- Original languages: IsiZulu, English, IsiXhosa
- No. of seasons: 3
- No. of episodes: 650

Production
- Executive producers: Gugu Zuma-Ncube; Bhekumuzi Leo Mamba; Pepsi Pokane; Mmamitse Thibedi; Theogeren Moodley
- Producer: Gugu – Zuma Mncube
- Production locations: Durban, South Africa
- Camera setup: Multi-cameras
- Running time: 22 – 24 minutes
- Production company: Stained Glass TV Production

Original release
- Network: e.tv eVOD
- Release: 5 October 2020 – 21 April 2023

Related
- Uzalo

Durban Gen was a South African medical drama telenovela. It was an e.tv original production that was commissioned and distributed by e.tv. The show was based in Durban and reflected on the struggles of the doctors and nurses in their daily lives at Durban General Hospital. The show was produced by Stained Glass TV Productions.

As of 5 August 2021, the show moved to eVOD with the show being broadcast there.

== Plot ==
The series centers around a newly qualified doctor, Mbalenhle "Mbali" Mthethwa (Nelisiwe Sibiya), who moves to the big city to complete her final year of community service at Durban General Hospital. She is torn between her fiancé, Sibusiso Dlamini (Ntando Mncube), and her boss, Dr. Lindelani Zulu (Mike Ndlangamandla). Arriving at the hospital, she assists in a surgery that results in the death of an MEC. This threatens the reputations of the hospital, Dr. Zulu, and Mbalenhle. Mbalenhle is thrown into an investigation which threatens to end her career. Five years later, after the death of Sbusiso, Mbalenhle becomes a sangoma and a senior doctor.

== Cast ==
=== Main and recurring cast ===
Actors	Characters	Seasons		
Actors	Characters	1	2	3
Nelisiwe Sibiya	Dr. Mbali Mthethwa	Main	Main	Main
Tumelo Matlala	Skhumbuzo Khumalo			Main
Meshach Mavuso	Dr. Thabo Dlamini	Main	Main	Main
Sthandwa Nzuza	Dr Zandile Mkhize	Recurring	Main	Main
Fanele Ntuli	Thandekile Zondo	Main	Main	Main
Bhekisiswe Mahlase	Calvin Gumede	Main	Main	Main
Nombulelo Mhlongo	Nurse Sne Mtshali	Main	Main	Main
Tsidi Makitle	Matron Phumeza Sibiya	Main	Main	Main
Yola Plaatjie	DrNangamso Jack		Main	Main
Thokozisa Ziqubu	Dr Lethuxolo Bhengu		Main	Main
Mthandeni Mbambo	Thulani Sibiya	Recurring	Main	Main
Sibongokuhle Nkosi	Thembinator		Main	Main
Asande Duabazani	Bafana Cele			Main
Joe Khazadi	Xola Lekabee			Main
Asavela Mqokiyana	Amahle Dladla			Main
Nondumiso Jozana	Ntando Shweni	Recurring	Recurring	Recurring
Priscilla Ngcobo	Andiswa Mhlongo	Recurring	Recurring	Recurring
Tina Jaxa	Nomvula Jack		Recurring	Recurring
Zanele Zulu	Sylvia Shange	Recurring	Recurring	Recurring
Ntlakanipho Mhlongo	Msizi Shange	Recurring	Recurring	Recurring
Sifiso Sibiya	Bab' Milton Gumede	Main	Recurring	Recurring
Mpume Mthombeni	Agatha Dlamini	Recurring	Main	Recurring

colspan ¼00

=== Former cast ===
Actor	Role
Lerato Nxumalo	Dr Ndabezinhle Luthuli
Mike Ndlangamandla	Dr Lindelani Zulu
Duduzile Ngcobo	Nomalanga Qwabe
Zimiphi Biyela	Matron Nkabinde
Sthandwa Nzuza	Dr Zandile Mkhize
Zakhele Mabasa	Sihle Ntuli
Zulu Boy	Magyver
Lizwi Ndumo	Lwandle Zulu
Bheki Sibiya	Dr Muzi Ndlovu
Martin Ziqubu	Mr Dlamini
Ntando Mncube	Sibusiso Dlamini
Lihle Dlomo	Dr Precious Dlamini
Cedric Fourie	Dr Mthembu
Fanele Zulu	Dr Mnqobi Mchunu
Nyaniso Dzedze	Sphesihle Dlomo

=== Character descriptions ===
==== Main cast ====
- Nelisiwe Sibiya as Dr. Mbali Mthethwa, a surgical intern. Mbali was engaged to Sibusiso Dlamini, who is Dr. Thabo Dlamini's brother. Five years later, she becomes a sangoma and is a senior doctor. She goes unconscious for a few minutes and comes back with an agreement with her ancestors to become a Sangoma. She was almost killed by Dr.Khumalo because she found out what happened to Sibiya.She is in a relationship with Lindani at the end of the series Main season 1-3
- Mavuso Magabane as Dr. Thabo Dlamini, Chief of Surgery. He was married to Dr. Precious Dlamini Thabo and a recovered alcoholic. He is married to Dr Zondo and they adopted a child Main role: season 1–3
- Duduzile Ngcobo as Dr. Nomalanga Qwabe, Superintendent. Superintendent Qwabe is the boss of Durban General Hospital. She appointed Dr. Zulu as acting superintendent in her absence. She later retires for her sickness and appoints Dr. Thabo Dlamini to be Superintendent permanently. Main role: seasons 1–2
- Mike Ndlangamandla as Dr. Lindelani Zulu, acting Superintendent and surgeon. Dr. Zulu is Mbali's love interest. Lindelani was in charge of the interns, but when he became Superintendent, he handed over the intern duties to Dr. Zandile Mkhize. He is in a relationship with Mbali and has a daughter Lwandle present season 1-3
- Lihle Dhlomo as Dr. Precious Dlamini, Head of OB and Gynaecology. Precious is Thabo's wife. She gave birth to Mvelo Dlamini. Main role: (season 1); recurring role: season 2
- Ntando Mncube as Sibusiso Dlamini. Sibusiso is an ambitious businessman, who is Mbali's fiance. He was shot dead at the hospital when Thabo told the truth about Mvelo being Sibusiso's child. Main role: season 1
- Zimiphi Biyela as Matron Nobuhle Nkabinde, head nurse. She constantly checks the nurses’ uniforms. Some of the employees avoid her at times. She retires five years later, with Phumeza as the new matron since season 3. She came back for a brief time to bring nurse trainees that they know how to be a nurse. Main role: season 1–2; recurring role: season 3
- Nombulelo Mhlongo as Nurse Sne Mtshali. Sne always knows the latest trends on social media and always knows what is happening in everyone's lives. Sne is the love interest of MacGyver . She was in a abused by her husband Dr.Dlomo . She got a miscarriage because she was beaten.she kill him . And want 5years in jail

Main role: season 1–present

- Bheki Mahlawe as Nurse Calvin Gumede. Calvin is the son of MaCele and Baba Gumede. Calvin is friends with Sne, MacGyver, and Phumeza. He had a one night stand with Precious, which resulted in her falling pregnant. Main role: season 1–present
- Fanele Ntuli as Dr. Thandekile Zondo Dlamini, surgical intern. Thandekile is an intern who is friends with Mbali and Ndabezinhle. She aims to be a surgeon after her internship, is married to Dr. Dlamini, and is a senior doctor. Main role: season 1–present
- Zuluboy as MacGyver, paramedic. He works closely with Baba Gumede as a paramedic. His love interest is Sne, who constantly rejects him. Main role: season 1–2
- Tshidi Makitle as Matron Phumeza Sibiya. Phumeza is a caring, soft-spoken, and well-mannered character. Her ability to tend to patients, as well as her overall diligence makes her the matron's favourite nurse. She is married to Detective Sibiya. Five years later, in season 3, she is the Matron of Durban General Hospital. Main role: season 1–present
- Sifiso Sibiya as Baba Milton Gumede. Baba Gumede is MaCele's husband and Calvin's father. Baba is revealed to be Msizi's father, and later retires from Durban Gen, moving in with his former mistress. He comes back in season 3 for Calvin and Dr. Jack's wedding. Main role: season 1; recurring role: season 2–present
- Sthandwa Nzuza - Dr. Zandile Mkhize, surgical doctor. She is Precious's friend and was married and divorced with Dr. Siyabonga Mkhize. She was in a romantic relationship with Dr. Khumalo. Recurring role: season 1; main role: seasons 2–3

=== Cast members ===
==== Season 1 ====
- Nelisiwe Sibiya as Dr. Mbali Mthethwa
- Mike Ndlangamandla as Dr. Lindelani Zulu
- Mavuso Magabane as Dr. Thabo Dlamini
- Duduzile Ngcobo as Dr. Nomalanga Qwabe
- Ntando Mncube as Sibusiso Dlamini
- Lihle Dhlomo as Dr. Precious Dlamini
- Fanele Ntuli as Dr. Thandekile Zondo
- Fanele Zulu as Dr. Mnqobi Mchunu
- Lerato Nxumalo as Dr. Ndabezinhle Luthuli
- Zimiphi Biyela as Matron Nobuhle Nkabinde
- Bheki Mahlawe as Nurse Calvin Gumede
- Nombulelo Mhlongo as Nurse Sne Mtshali
- Tshidi Makitle as Nurse Phumeza Sibiya
- Thulani Shange as Dr. Mandla Ngcobo
- Monica Zulu as MaCele Gumede
- Mxolisi Majozi as MacGyver
- Sifiso Sibiya as Bab'Milton Gumede
- Bheki Sibiya as Dr. Muzi Ndlovu

==== Season 2 ====
- Nelisiwe Sibiya as Dr. Mbali Mthethwa
- Mike Ndlangamandla as Dr. Lindelani Zulu
- Mavuso Magabane as Dr. Thabo Dlamini
- Duduzile Ngcobo as Dr. Nomalanga Qwabe
- Sthandwa Nzuza as Dr. Zandile Mkhize
- Fanele Ntuli as Dr. Thandekile Zondo
- Zimiphi Biyela as Matron Nobuhle Nkabinde
- Bheki Mahlawe as Nurse Calvin Gumede
- Nombulelo Mhlongo as Nurse Sne Mtshali
- Tshidi Makitle as Nurse Phumeza Sibiya
- Mxolisi Majozi as MacGyver
- Thokozisa Ziqubu as Dr. Lethuxolo Bhengu
- Yola Plaatjie as Dr. Nangamso Jack
- Mthandeni Mbambo as Thulani Sibiya
- Sibongokuhle Nkosi as Thembinator
- Mpume Mthombeni as Agatha Dlamini
- Zakhele Mabasa as Paramedic Sihle Ntuli
- Nyaniso Dzedze as Dr. Sphesihle Dlomo

==== Season 3 ====
- Nelisiwe Sibiya as Dr. Mbali Mthethwa
- Tumelo Matlatla as Dr.Skhumbuzo Khumalo
- Mavuso Magabane as Dr. Thabo Dlamini
- Fanele Ntuli as Dr. Thandekile Zondo
- Sthandwa Nzuza as Dr. Zandile Mkhize
- Bheki Mahlawe as Nurse Calvin Gumede
- Nombulelo Mhlongo as Nurse Sne Mtshali
- Tshidi Makitle as Matron Phumeza Sibiya
- Thokozani Ziqubu as Dr. Lethuxolo Bhengu
- Yola Plaatjie as Dr. Nangamso Jack
- Mthandeni Mbambo as Thulani Sibiya
- Sibongokuhle Nkosi as Thembinator
- Asanda Dubazane as Bafana Cele
- Joe Kazadi as Xola Lekabe
- Asavela Mqokiyana as Amahle Dladla

== Production ==
On 21 August 2020, e.tv announced that the series would premiere on 5 October.

According to e.tv's head of local productions Helga Palmar, the series was premiered to honor frontline workers.
