= Noxolo =

Noxolo is a Southern African feminine given name. It is also a surname.

== People with the given name ==
- Noxolo Cesane (born 2000), South African soccer player
- Noxolo Dlamini (born 1991), South African actress
- Noxolo Kiviet, South African politician
- Noxolo Maqashalala (1977 – 2021), South African actress
- Noxolo Mathula (born 1993), South African actress, model, and musician
- Noxolo Nogwaza (1987 – 2011), South African LGBT rights activist

== People with the surname ==
- Patricia Noxolo, British geographer
