= Mbali Maphumulo =

South African actress and singer

- Born: Thandiwe Mbali Maphumulo; 24 November 1980 (age 45); Umlazi, South Africa
- Occupations: Actress, Singer, Dancer
- Years active: 1997–present
- Spouse: Dumisani Mbebe

Thandiwe Mbali Maphumulo (born 24 March 1980) is a South African actress, singer and dancer who was in television serials such as 4Play: Sex Tips for Girls, Uzalo and Is'thunzi.

== Personal life ==
Maphumulo was born on 24 November 1980 in Umlazi, KwaZulu-Nata, South Africa. When she was 13 years of age, her parents died. Then she raised with her aunt.

She is married to fellow actor Dumisani Mbebe since 2016, but the relationship dated back to 2009. In 2001 when she was 21 years old, she diagnosed with breast cancer. Then she underwent a mastectomy surgery. However, the cancer returned in 2006.

== Career ==
Apart from acting, she is also a singer, who started the career with the "Shell Road to Fame" talent contest. She worked with a Pretoria stage production company and later moved to Gauteng. Then she worked two weeks in the City of Gold. Then she got the opportunity to perform in the globally acclaimed stage play Umoja – Spirit of Togetherness. Then she made a notable performance in the play The Lion King, playing Nala for two years in the show's German production. During these two theatre performances, she recorded solo songs for both plays.

In 1997, she became the winner of Miss Kaizer Chiefs and then started modeling career. In 2008, she appeared in the SABC2 soap opera Muvhango with the role of "Fikile". In 2010, she joined with the e.tv drama series 4Play: Sex Tips for Girls to play the lead role of "Amira Mokoena". She continued to play the role until 2012 with popularity. After that success, in 2013, she then starred in the miniseries Abangani and telenovela Isibaya both telecast in Mzansi Magic. At the same time, she also appeared in the SABC1 drama Tempy Pushas and played the role "Stella.

In 2015, she appeared in the etv. anthology series eKasi: Our Stories. Then in 2016, she made the recurring role of "Nomonde" in the Mzansi Magic drama Is'thunzi. Then she returned to the second season to reprise her role. During the series, she also worked as the costume designer, script translator, hair and makeup artist. In 2020, she appeared in the Moja Love serial Erased. In 2021, she joined with the serials; Hush Money with the role "Cebile Buthelezi" and in Uzalo with the role "Wenzile Nhlapo". She also acted in the films such as; State Enemy No.1, and Safe Bet.

== Filmography ==
Year	Film	Role	Genre	Ref.
2008-2017	Muvhango	Fikile	TV series	
2010	4Play: Sex Tips for Girls	Amira Mokoena	TV series	
2011	The Wild	Thandi	TV series	
2013	Abangani	Bongi	TV series	
2013	Isibaya	Buhle	TV series	
2013	Tempy Pushas	Stella	TV series	
2015	Safe Bet	Dash #1	Film	
2015	eKasi: Our Stories	Happy	TV series	
2016	Is'thunzi	Nomonde	TV series	
2021	Hush Money	Cebile Buthelezi	TV series	
2021	Uzalo	Wenzile Nhlapo	TV series	
TBD	State Enemy No.1	Grace	Film	
