= Nozipho Nkelemba =

South African actress

- Born: Nozipho Nkelemba; 1991 (age 34–35); South Africa
- Education: Wits National School of the Arts; AAA School of Advertising
- Occupations: Actress, Casting director, Director, Brand endorser, Scriptwriter
- Years active: 2004–present
- Spouse: Richard Lukunku
- Children: 1

Nozipho Nkelemba (born 1991) is a South African actress, casting director, director, brand endorser, and scriptwriter. She is best known for the roles in the television serials such as; Rhythm City, Mzansi Love and Heartlines.

== Personal life ==
Nkelemba was born in 1991 in South Africa. She trained performance and directing from the Wits National School of the Arts. Then she completed a degree in Brand Communications from the AAA School of Advertising.

She is married to fellow actor, Richard Lukunku, who appeared in the plays Ashes to Ashes, Rhythm City, and Isidingo. The couple has one son.

== Career ==
Before starting professional acting, she made television appearances with commercials where she played the role of "a girl on a bus" in a commercial for Allan Gray insurance.

In 2006, she appeared in the SABC2 drama Heartlines with the role "Ayanda Sibeko" and as "Mmatsietsi" in the SABC1 anthology miniseries When We Were Black. In the next year, she appeared in the SABC2 mini-series When We Were Black. In 2011, she joined with the third season of the SABC2 parliamentary drama serial 90 Plein Street where she played the role of "Nana". In the same year, she in the feature film The Forgotten Kingdom by playing the role of "Dineo Rachabane". Then in 2012, she joined with e.tv anthology comedy drama Mzansi Love and played the role "Arizona". In the second season of the show, she played the role "Nomsa".

Meanwhile, she played the role of "schoolgirl Charlotte" on the e.tv soap opera Rhythm City which became very popular. In 2013, she appeared in two serials: as "Grace" in the second season SABC1 drama Intersexions and then as "Palesa" . In 2014, she acted in the SABC1 mystery thriller Task Force with the role "Zandi". Then in the next year, she joined with Mzansi Magic drama Ya Lla to play the role "Nala". In 2016, she worked as the casting director for the eKasi+ drama serial Hustle. Then in the same year, she became the casting director for the SABC2 telenovela Keeping Score. Apart from that, she also worked as the dialogue and language coach of the show. Then she played the role "Khethi" in the second season of SABC1 drama Dream World. In 2018, she appeared in the SABC1 supernatural anthology Emoyeni by playing the role "Kitso" as well as wrote the script of the show. Later she won the award for the Best Achievement in Scriptwriting in TV Drama category at the South African Film and Television Awards. In 2020, she directed the telenovela Gomora and won the Best Achievement in Directing Award in Telenovela at 2021 SAFTAs.

== Filmography ==
Year	Film	Role	Genre	Ref.
2006	Heartlines	Ayanda Sibeko	TV series	
2006	When We Were Black	Mmatsietsi	TV series	
2011	90 Plein Street	Nana	TV series	
2012	Mzansi Love	Arizona / Nomsa	TV series	
	Rhythm City	Charlotte	TV series	
2012	uSkroef noSexy	Thando	Film	
2013	The Forgotten Kingdom	Dineo Rachabane	Film	
2013	Intersexions	Grace	TV series	
2013	Let Heaven Wait	Palesa	TV series	
2014	Task Force	Zandi	TV series	
2014	In Kgantse & Kenny's Paradise	Thando	TV series	
2015	Ya Lla	Nala	TV series	
2016	Dream World	Khethi	TV series	
2016	Hustle	casting director	TV series	
2016	Keeping Score	casting director	TV series	
2017	Black Dots	Thandi	Short film	
2018	Emoyeni	Kitso	TV series	
2020	Gomora	Director	TV special	
2024	Blood Legacy	Director	TV series	
