= Masoja Msiza =

South African actor, poet and musician

- Born: Masoja Msiza; 5 October 1964 (age 61); KwaThema, Gauteng, South Africa
- Occupations: Actor; Poet; Musician
- Years active: 1992-present
- Notable work: Uzalo; Sokhulu & Partners; Kalushi

Masoja Josiah Msiza (born 5 October 1964) is a South African actor, poet and musician. He is best known for portraying "Nkunzi Mhlongo" in the award-winning telenovela Uzalo.

== Early life ==
Msiza was born in Kwa-Thema, a township in the South African province of Gauteng. His love for acting started when he was 9 years old and he enjoyed participating in art and drama classes. At the age of 14 he participated in a drama competition in his school which he won. After finishing school he found work as a miner and he eventually ended up being fired along with other miners who were involved in a strike. Following his dismissal, he decided to pursue his dream to become an actor and his debut gig was featured in a play called "Mfowethu" which was directed by Gibson Kente.

== Career ==
Msiza began his career as a poet and later a stage and television actor, musician and storyteller. He has appeared in a number of notable films such as Kalushi: The Story of Solomon Mahlangu and A Million Colours. However, his most prominent role is his portrayal of the ruthless crime lord Nkunzebomvu "Nkunzi" Mhlongo on the most viewed television show in South Africa Uzalo. He has also appeared in several TV series such as Scandal!, Shreads and Dreams, Rhythm City, Intersexions, A Place Called Home, Sokhulu & Partners, and Making Cents with the Sitholes.

In 2016, he got his first starring role in television in a telenovela called "Ring of Lies".

In 2004, he wrote poems for the South African National Football Team during the AFCON tournament held in Tunisia. He also wrote and performed promo poems for the largest radio station in South Africa Ukhozi FM.

On June 22, 2019, Masoja Msiza alongside Dudu Khoza presented the first annual Cothoza Music Awards hosted by the multi-award-winning A cappella group Ladysmith Black Mambazo.

== Filmography ==
| Year | Film | Role |
|---|---|---|
| 2011 | Sokhulu & Partners | Mthethwa |
| 2011 | Isidingo | Saul |
| 2012 | Zama Zama | Oliver |
| 2013 | Zabalaza | Lary |
| 2013 | Mfolozi Street | Mandla |
| 2013 | Intersexions | Malinga |
| 2013-2014 | Inkaba | Goodman |
| 2012 | A place called home | Hudson |
| 2016 | Isibaya | Bhodlimpi |
| 2016 | Kalushi: The Story of Solomon Mahlangu | Rev. Ndlovu |
| 2014 | Rhythm City (TV series) | Joe Mafelane |
| 2015 | Zone 14 | Thomas |
| 2015-2016 | Umlilo | Welcome |
| 2015 | Ya Lla | Gate Guard |
| 2015-2017 | Rings Of Lies | Mandla |
| 2018–Present | Uzalo | Nkunzebomvu Mhlongo |

== Poems and songs ==
- Time to Rhyme
- Babulawelani
- The Click Poem
- Nokuthula
- The 8th Man
- Hamba Nami
- My Love
- Hallelujah
- Mbalif
- My Skin
- Women and the Ocean

== Personal life ==
Msiza is a father of three, one son and two daughters.

== Awards and nominations ==
| Year | Award Ceremony | Category | Recipient | Result | Ref. |
|---|---|---|---|---|---|
| 2018 | Dstv Mzansi Magic Viewers Choice Awards | Best Actor | Masoja Msiza | Nominated | |
| 2024 | Simon Mabhunu Sabela Film and Television Awards | Dear Future Wife | Masoja Msiza | Won | |

== See also ==
- Uzalo
- Kalushi: The Story of Solomon
- A Million Colours
