= Fanele Ntuli =

South African actress

- Born: Fanele Ntuli; 7 March 1991 (age 35)
- Education: Durban Girls' High School
- Alma mater: Oaksfields College
- Occupations: Actress, Television presenter, YouTuber
- Years active: 2013–present
- Known for: Uzalo as Nomaswazi Magwaza

Fanele Ntuli (born 7 March 1991) is a South African actress, television presenter and YouTuber. She is best known for the roles in the television serials Uzalo and Durban Gen.

== Personal life ==
She entered Durban Girls High School in 2003 and matriculated in 2008. Then in 2013, she obtained Higher Certificate on Dramatic studies from Oaksfields College.

== Career ==
During her life at Oaksfields College, she performed in the theatre productions such as; In Love With Shakespeare with the role "Lady Mac Beth", in The Story of Jane Doe as "Nurse Coco" and in Imagine as "Michelle, the magician". In 2015, she made her television debut with the minor role of "School girl" in the soap opera Isibaya. Then in 2016, she joined with the serial Uzalo to play the role "Mandisa". After that success, she joined with the regular cast of e.tv. medical drama telenovela Durban Gen, where she is playing the role "Dr Thandekile Zondo". She is now playing the role "Nomaswazi Magwaza" on the serial Uzalo after she played "Mandisa" in 2016.

Year	Film	Role	Genre	Ref.
2022	Uzalo	Nomsawazi Magwaza	Sophie	
2015	Isibaya	School Girl	telenovela	
2019	Ifalakhe	Zanezulu	TV series	
2019-2023	Durban Gen	Dr Thandekile Zondo	Telenovela	
