= Noxolo Mathula =

South African actress

- Born: Noxolo Mathula; 31 December 1990 (age 35); Durban, South Africa
- Education: Parkhill High school
- Alma mater: AFDA Durban
- Occupations: Actress, Model, Musician
- Years active: 2018–present
- Television: EHostela
- Height: 5 ft 8 in (173 cm)

Noxolo Mathula (born 31 December 1990) is a South African actress, model, and musician. She is best known for her roles in television serials, such as eHostela and Uzalo.

== Personal life ==
Mathula was born on 31 December 1990 and raised in Durban, Kwa-Mashu, South Africa. She is believed to be a daughter of former South African president Jacob Zuma, who has about 22 children. She later moved to Umhlanga Rocks with the family. She completed education from Parkhill High school in Durban and later matriculated in 2008. In 2015, she graduated with a Bachelor's degree in motion pictures and live performances from AFDA Durban. Her sister is Ntombizenhlanhla Amanda Zuma.

== Career ==
In 2018, she entered professional acting with cameo roles in Mzansi Bioskop shows such as Abasebenzi 1 & 2 and Abo Chommee. In the meantime, she appeared in the serial Ibutho as well. In 2019, she joined with the cast of Mzansi Magic drama serial eHostela, and played the role of "Fikephethwe". Her role became very popular among the public, where she continued to play the role in both seasons. Later in the year, she won the Best Supporting Actress Award at the Simon Sabela Film Awards 2019 for this role.

Then she joined with the serial Ifalakhe and played the supportive role of "Phikiwe". In 2020, she made cameo appearances in the SABC 1 soap opera Uzalo, where she played the role of "Lilly". However, at the end of 2020, she became a regular cast of the soapie.

As a musician, Noxolo joined with Clash of the Choir, and represented team KZN with her choir master Busiswa.

== Filmography ==
Year	Film	Role	Genre	Ref.
2018	Ibutho	minor role	TV series	
2019	EHostela	Fikephethwe / Fiks	TV series	
2019	Ifalakhe	Phikiwe	TV series	
2020	Uzalo	Lillian dongwe	TV series	
