= Bongi Ndaba =

South African producer, writer, and actress

- Born: 10 February 1972 (age 54); Free State, South Africa
- Education: Durban University of Technology; University of KwaZulu-Natal
- Occupations: producer; writer
- Writing career
- Notable works: Generations, Generations:The Legacy, Home Affairs, Muvhango, Gaz'lam, Shreds and Dreams, Isidingo, Sokhulu and Partners, Ashes To Ashes, Society, Ring Of Lies, 4Play: Sex Tips For Girls, Izingane Zobaba, Jozi H, Uzalo, Father Christmas Doesn't Come Here, Z'bondiwe, Saints And Sinners

Bongi Ndaba (born 10 February 1972) is a South African producer and writer for television, as well as an actress and playwright.

From 2012 to 2014 she was the head writer and co-producer for the South African soap opera Generations, having worked behind-the-scenes for the programme for eight years previously and eleven in total. As an actress, she is best known for her portrayal as Goneril in SABC1's King Lear mini-series (adapted as Izingane Zobaba), which aired in 2008. Her most notable work as a playwright is Shreds and Dreams, written in 2004, which was adapted into the mini-series of the same name. The mini-series has run from 2010 on SABC1.

== Biography ==
As a young woman. She went on to study performing arts professionally at the Durban University of Technology and as a student, developed her interest in playwriting. After completing a second degree in education at UKZN, Ndaba moved to Johannesburg because of the opportunities in television available in the city. Her writing was noticed by the Market Theatre's New Writer's Festival, and she was given the opportunity to work alongside the novelist, poet, and playwright Zakes Mda. After partaking in a six-month selection process competing for an internship for the soap opera Generations, she, among 8 others, were hired out of a group of 230 hopefuls. She was appointed the head writer in 2012 and served in the role until her resignation in 2014.

In 2016–2017 she served as a head writer of Isidingo, a popular South African television soap opera. One of the most controversial episodes she wrote for this show was episode 29, which aired on 26 April 2017. This episode was aired just a day before 27 April, which marked 23 years of Freedom in South Africa. This episode highlighted Bongi Ndaba as being a most unapologetic, bold South African television writer. In this episode, the principal character of the show pays respect to the grave site of his father on a farm. He is then approached by two white racist men, who start calling him derogatory names. The two men bury the man alive in a shallow grave. This episode was followed by a sequence of three other episodes that were aired on 1, 2 and 3 May 2017, which were brought forward to the Broadcasting Complaints Commission of South Africa (BCCSA); they were said to be, inter alia, promoting violence and promoting hate speech, thus these episodes or scenes were claimed to be in contravention of clause 4(1) and 2 of the Free-to-Air Code of Conduct for Broadcasting Service Licensees. The BCCSA's Chairperson, H.P. Viljoen that the broadcasting of these episodes did not contravene clause 4(1) or (2) or any other clause of the Code of Conduct and therefore none of the complaints were upheld.

During her tenure as head writer of Isidingo, the ratings of Isidingo soared as they reached an-all-time high, with 1.6 million viewers, delivering the biggest number of viewers that Isidingo had ever seen, and thus reviving a dead TV show. Sadly, when she left Isidingo, the ratings of the show continued to plummet. Currently the ratings of the show are sitting to 0.95 thousand viewers.

== Filmography ==
Playwright
Year	Film	Genre	Other notes
2003	Shreds and Dreams	Stage Play	
2009	Shaken	Stage Play	
Film
Year	Title	Genre	Notes
2010	Father Christmas Doesn't Come Here	Short Film	Writer
2019	Miracle	Short Film	writer, director
Head Writer
Year	Title	Genre	Notes
2011	Generations	Soapie	Writer, Co-Producer
2014	Generations: The Legacy	Soapie	
2010	Shreds and Dreams	Drama Series	Season 1
2015	Shreds and Dreams	Drama Series	Season 2
2016	Isidingo	Soapie	
2018	Uzalo	Soapie	
2019	eHostela	Drama Series	
2022	The Estate	Telenovela	
2023	Nikiwe (TV series)	Telenovela	
Writer
Year	Title	Genre	Notes
2005	Gaz'lam	Drama Series	
2008	Home Affairs	Drama Series	
2006	Muvhango	Soapie	
2006	Society	Drama Series	
2006	4 Play: Sex Tips For Girls	Drama Series	
2009	Sokhulu and Partners	Drama Series	
2010	Jozi H	Drama Series	
2014	Saints and Sinners	Drama Series	
2015	Ashes to Ashes	Telenovela	
2016	Z'bondiwe	Drama Series	
2017	Isikizi	Drama Series	
2018	Ring of Lies	Telenovela	Storyliner, Scriptwriter
2018	Uzalo	Telenovela	Head writer
2019	Ambitions	Drama Series	Storyliner, Scriptwriter
2020	Imbewu: The Seed	Soapie	Story liner
2020	Erased	Drama Series	Creator, Producer
2021	The Estate	Telenovela	Storyliner, Scriptwriter
2022	The Estate Season 3	Telenovela	Head Writer
2022	Gomora	Telenovela	Storyliner, Scriptwriter

== Awards ==
In 2017, Bongi Ndaba wrote a South African first WhatsApp drama series titled Uk'shona Kwelanga. It was produced by Sanlam. Ukshona Kwelanga was a groundbreaking insurance advertising drama series, targeted at South African WhatsApp users, as the largest medium of communication. In 2017, Bongi Ndaba won a WRITING CRAFT GOLD from the Loeries for her stellar writing in "Uk'Shona Kwelanga". Loeries are the most prestigious creative industry and brand communication awards for Africa & the Middle East.

In March 2018, the format of storytelling and advertising of insurance product through WhatsApp, saw Bongi Ndaba winning two awards at #Bookmarks2018 Awards for her writing in Uk'shona Kwelanga. The Sanlam product Uk'shona Kwelanga won a SILVER for Integrated Mixed Media Campaign and a GOLD for Bots, Messaging & Dark Social at the #BookMarks2018 Awards.
