= Nikiwe (TV series) =

- Created by: Thomas Gumede
- Written by: Bongi Ndaba; Chisanga Kabinga; Dorette Nel; Neil McCarthy; Minenhle Luthuli; Lunga John Radebe; Pretty Mkhwanazi; Tony Miyambo; Estelle Banda; Alex Xolo (intern); Motlalepule Youlanda Tlhatlogi (intern)
- Directed by: Thomas Gumede
- Starring: Lungelo Mpangase; Clementine Mosimane; Craig Nobela; Kenneth Nkosi; Slindokuhle Tshabalala; Akhona Ndlovu; Soso Runqu; Loipolo Maphathe; Mpho Sibeko; Hamilton Dhlamini; Aya Brandy Ndzimande; Neo Iman Mothae; Tshepiso Segodu; Makodi Phumodi; Israel Matseke-Zulu; Mondli Makhoba
- Country of origin: South Africa
- Original languages: English; IsiZulu
- No. of seasons: 1
- No. of episodes: 190

Production
- Executive producers: Thomas Gumede; Lungile Radu
- Producer: Analine Pringle
- Camera setup: Multi-camera
- Running time: 22 minutes
- Production company: Parental Advisory Productions

Original release
- Network: e.tv eVOD
- Release: 17 April 2023 – 5 January 2024

Related
- Durban Gen

Nikiwe was a South African television drama series written by Bongi Ndaba and executive produced by Thomas Gumede and Lungile Radu. It is an e.tv original production produced by Parental Advisory Productions for e.tv, and stars Lungelo Mpangase, Muzi Mthabela, Clementine Mosimane, Kenneth Nkosi and Israel Matseke Zulu.

== Plot ==
The series revolves around the "hood-rich" Radebe family. Themba "Bhungane" Radebe (Muzi Mthabela), a determined businessman, leads the clan with his wife Mirriam and their three children, Nikiwe, Menzi, and Mandisa.

Nikiwe (Lungelo Mpangase), the eldest and heir to the family empire, is a socialite with good intentions. She soon loses it all when a tragedy at the Radebe home strikes.

== Cast ==
Actors	Characters	Seasons
Actors	Characters	1
Lungelo Mpangase	Nikiwe Radebe	Main
Clementine Mosimane	MaSibisi Radebe	Main
Kenneth Nkosi	Skeitla Skhosana	Main
Hamilton Dlamini	Mdlalose	Main
Akhona Ndlovu	Ntsika Radebe	Main
Craig Nobela	Menzi Radebe	Main
Slindokuhle Tshabalala	Mandisa Radebe	Main
Neo Mothae	MaDlamini	Main
Liopelo Maphathe	Dimakatso Sikhosane	Main
Soso Runqu	Lungelo "Lulu" Ngebulana	Main
Tshepho Seogiso	Bra Julius	Recurring
Makoto Phumodi	Brenda "Mabrr-Bree"	Recurring

== Characters ==
- Nikiwe "Nikki R" Radebe, played by Lungelo Mpangase: the main diamond in the Radebe family who was foretold to be the CEO of Radebe Enterprise, but the table is turned after she realises she is not the oldest of her father's children.
- MaSibisi Radebe, played by Clementine Mosimane: the vicious grandmother of Nikiwe, Menzi, Mandisa, and Ntsika. Her return from prison caused havoc in the Radebe homestead. He is the mother of Themba Radebe.
- Ntsika Radebe, played by Akhona Ndlovu: the secret son of Radebe and Lulu. His quest is to take everything that was meant to be his after he was cast out to a life of poverty. His ambitiousness has Nikiwe fighting for her position in the family and the business.
- Skeitla Skhosana, played by Kenneth Nkosi: the brother of Mirriam Radebe (Nikiwe's mother) and struggles with gambling addiction. He is the husband of Dimakasto and father to their daughter "Warona".
- Menzi Radebe, played by Craig Nobela: the younger brother of Nikiwe, Mandisa, and Ntsika, who is caught up in the family war and is expected to choose a side
- Mandisa Radebe played by Slindokuhle Tshabalala: She is the youngest of Themba Radebe's children who secretly suffering from depression and anxiety due to the death of her parents.
- Bheki Radebe played by Mondli Makhoba: He is the protective uncle of Nikiwe, Menzi and Mandisa and his arrival in the Radebe mansion has MaSibisi feeling threatened.
- Mdlalose played by Hamilton Dhlamini: He works for the Radebe's as he was Themba Radebe's right-hand man but now works for MaSibisi. He fell in love with Philisiwe Dlamini who was Themba Radebe's side chick.
- Luyanda "Largest" Dlamini played by Mpho Sibeko: He is the youngest brother of Philisiwe Dlamini and Nikiwe's love interest. He is a popular charming and handsome student in Campus
- Lungelo Lulu Nebulane played by Soso Runqu: She is the vicious mother of Ntsika and Themba Radebe's former secret lover. Her mission is to be long and crown her son CEO of Radebe Enterprise. She will do anything to maintain her lavish lifestyle like a Real Housewife of Soweto.
- Dimakatso Skhosana played by Loipelo Maphathe: She is the bubbly wife of Skeita Skhosana and mother of Warona. She is a Salon owner and Nikiwe's aunt.

== Production ==
In 2022, e.tv announced that the telenovela Durban Gen would not be renewed for a third season. The channel announced that a new series would be replacing the series. The series is Parental Advisory Productions' first telenovela.

In a statement, executive producer Thomas Gumede said "We're pulling all stops with this show, splitting shoots between studio and location; this will result in nonstop and back-to-back dramatic scenes for the audiences".

Mark Madai, executive producer for e.tv, said they fell in love with the concept because it follows the lives of the youth. He added that they wanted to give viewers a product they could resonate with "night in, night out".

The series was filmed in surrounding areas of Soweto.

On Friday 24 March 2023, e.tv released the trailer for the series on YouTube.

On Sunday 16 April 2023, the channel held a launch for the series at the Joburg Theatre.

== Broadcast ==
The series premiered on the 17th of April, on e.tv and eVOD.
