= Manqoba Mngqithi =

South African football manager

Personal information
- Full name: Manqoba Brilliant Ferrimant Mngqithi
- Date of birth: 25 April 1971 (age 55)
- Place of birth: Umzimkhulu, KwaZulu-Natal, South Africa

Team information
- Current team: Young Africans (head coach)

Managerial career
- Years: Team
- –: Maritzburg City
- –: Moja United
- –: Highlanders
- –: University of KwaZulu-Natal
- 2007–2010: Golden Arrows
- 2010–2011: AmaZulu
- 2012: Chippa United
- 2012–2013: Golden Arrows
- 2013–2020: Mamelodi Sundowns (assistant)
- 2020–2022: Mamelodi Sundowns (co-head coach)
- 2022–2024: Mamelodi Sundowns (senior coach)
- 2024: Mamelodi Sundowns (head coach)
- 2025–2026: Golden Arrows
- 2026–2026: Young Africans

Manqoba Brilliant Ferrimant Mngqithi (born 25 April 1971 in Umzimkhulu) is a South African soccer coach who most recently coached Young Africans.

== Career ==
He has managed a number of clubs in the Premiership. He is a former schoolteacher by profession.

=== Mamelodi Sundowns ===
Mngqithi joined Mamelodi Sundowns as assistant coach in 2013 to Pitso Mosimane. He was part of the technical team that won five Premiership titles, the CAF Champions League, the CAF Super Cup, as well as the two FA Cup and League Cup trophies before Mosimane's departure in 2020.

He and fellow assistant coach Rhulani Mokwena were appointed as joint head coaches in 2020, and together led the club to two league titles. Mokwena then took over the role on his own, with Mngqithi becoming a senior coach. Mngqithi took over as sole head coach following Mokwena's departure in July 2024.

In December 2024 he was dismissed by Sundowns and replaced by Miguel Cardoso after a poor start to the season.

=== Lamontville Golden Arrows ===
In March 2025 he rejoined Lamontville Golden Arrows, leading them to the Top 8 for the first time since 2021.

=== Young Africans ===
In July 2026, Mngqithi joined Tanzanian club Young Africans as head coach. He claimed his first trophy outside South Africa when Yanga beat Simba SC 1–0 in the Tanzania Community Shield (Ngao ya Jamii) at the New Amaan Complex in August 2026. He was dismissed in October 2026, having led the club to the group stages of the Champions League, and with a record ten wins, two draws and one defeat.

=== Manager ===
As of match played 5 December 2024

Managerial record by team and tenure
Team	From	To	Record				
Team	From	To	P	W	D	L	Win %
Mamelodi Sundowns (joint)	4 October 2020	25 October 2022	109	70	29	10	64.2
Mamelodi Sundowns	4 July 2024	10 December 2024	15	10	2	3	66.7
Total			124	80	31	13	64.5

== Personal life ==
Mngqithi is the father of actress Asavela Mqokiyana.

== Honours ==
Mamelodi Sundowns

- Premiership: 2020–21, 2021–22
- MTN 8: 2009, 2021
- Nedbank Cup: 2021–22

Young Africans

- Tanzania Community Shield: 2026
