= Mike Ndlangamandla =

South African actor (born 1990)

- Born: Mike Ndlangamandla; 8 July 1990 (age 36); Mpumalanga, South Africa
- Education: DNA Academy
- Occupations: Actor, model
- Years active: 2016–present
- Known for: Durban Gen
- Children: 1

Mike Ndlangamandla (born 8 July 1990) is a South African actor and model who was in the television series Muvhango and Durban Gen.

== Personal life ==
Ndlangamandla was born 8 July 1990 in Piet Retief, Mpumalanga province, South Africa.

== Career ==
Before entering drama, he joined a casting agency. In the meantime, he studied drama at the DNA academy at Johannesburg Theatre. In 2018, he played the supportive role of "Pastor Max" on SABC 2 Venda drama serial Muvhango. Then in 2019, he appeared in the etv sci-fi telenovela Isipho and played the role "Teboho". In 2020, he joined with the regular cast of the e.tv. medical telenovela Durban Gen. In the series, he played the lead role of "Dr. Lindelani Zulu" until October 2022.

== Filmography ==
Year	Film	Role	Genre	Ref.
2019	Isipho: The Gift	Teboho	TV Series	
2020–2023	Durban Gen	Dr. Lindelani Zulu	TV Series	
2024	Blood Legacy	Siya Ndlovu	TV Series	
