= TDK Macassette =

South African dancer, singer, radio host and media personality

- Born: Thandeka Nompumelelo Mkhwanazi; 22 September 1992 (age 33); Durban, South Africa
- Education: Durban Girls' High School; Durban University of Technology
- Occupations: Dancer; Singer; Radio host; Media personality
- Years active: Dancer: 2014–present; Singer: 2018–present
- Musical career
- Genres: Gqom
- Instruments: Vocals
- Label: Universal Music

TDK Macassette (born 22 September 1992), whose real name is Thandeka Nompumelelo Mkhwanazi, is a South African dancer, singer, radio host and media personality. She got her break in the music industry when she provided corporate services to DJ Maphorisa after they had been to a corporate gig. She is the founder of a communication management company called Tdeeiosion.

== Early life and education ==
TDK Macasette was born in Durban, South Africa. She obtained her BTech in Communications Management at Durban University of Technology.

== Career ==
She began her career hosting a youth show at Ukhozi FM at the age of fourteen. Though she served as a radio host, she was fond of dancing at a young age. She pursued her love for dancing after being motivated by her parents. She then began appearing in tours with HHP as a part of his female dance squad in his Gauteng tours.

In February 2018, she signed to Universal Music. Her debut single "Domoroza", was released through the record label. Shortly after its release she performed the single on Channel O.

She was involved in the production of DJ Maphorisa’s "iWalk Ye Phara", before she was controversially replaced on the remix by singer Moonchild Sanelly., Later that same year, she released a single titled "Zama", which featured rapper Okmalumkoolkat.

In May 2019, she released her single "Left Right". As a dancer, she was featured on Prince Kaybee’s music video for "Gugulethu". Later that year, she traveled to Germany for her European Tour alongside amapiano producer, Kabza De Small, the tour marked her first ever international tour. She has also performed at local music festivals such as the Dubane Spring Break and Gamalakhe Music Festival. She also performed during the South African opposition political party, Democratic Alliance manifesto launch at The Rand Stadium in Johannesburg. She has appeared on the SABC 3 television show, Afternoon Express.

In October 2020, she released her single "Mashobana".

== Awards and nominations ==
Year	Award ceremony	Prize	Result
2019	Mzansi Kwaito and House Music Awards	Best Gqom artist	Nominated
