= Durban Girls' High School =

Durban Girls’ High School

Location
- 495 Lena Ahrens Road, Glenwood, 4001; Durban, KwaZulu-Natal; South Africa; 29.87371°S 30.98613°E

Information
- Type: State school
- Motto: Strongly, Faithfully, Happily (Fortiter, Fideliter, Feliciter )
- Established: 1882
- School district: Umlazi District
- Principal: Kathy Fredericks Acting Principal as of 2025
- Teaching staff: over 80 staff members
- Grades: 8-12
- Gender: Girls
- Colours: Blue, Green & White
- Athletics: Soccer; Basketball; Indoor/Outdoor Hockey; Majorettes; Swimming; Tennis; Badminton; Waterpolo; Netball; Volleyball; Touch Rugby
- Houses: Amethyst (purple); Citrine (yellow); Malachite (green); Kyanite (blue); Garnet (red)
- Website: www.dghs.co.za

Durban Girls' High School (known to the students of the school as DGHS) is a public high school for girls located in Glenwood, a suburb of Durban, KwaZulu-Natal, South Africa. It was founded in 1882 and is home to over 1200 students.

== Nose-stud controversy ==
In 2005 there was controversy around a Durban Girls' High student, Sunali Pillay, and her decision to get a nose piercing over the school holidays. The pupil was of Tamil (South Asian) descent, commonly known as part of the Indian South Africa population group in South Africa, and had her nose pierced as part of her religious and cultural beliefs. The school's governing body objected to Pillay's nose-stud, stating it went against school dress code. Navaneethum Pillay, Sunali's mother, argued that her daughter should wear her nose piercing as South Africa's Constitution protects religious freedom and diversity in schools. The Pillays eventually won the court case against the school, with Chief Justice Pius Langa declaring in 2007 that:

“Preventing her from wearing it [nose stud] for several hours of each school day would undermine the practice and therefore constitute a significant infringement of her religious and cultural identity. What is relevant is the symbolic effect of denying her the right to wear it for even a short period; it sends a message that Sunali, her religion and her culture are not welcome.”

== Notable alumnae ==
- Tikvah Alper, radiobiologist
- Amy Jacot Guillarmod, botanist and limnologist
- Sally-Ann Murray, author
- Fanele Ntuli, actress
- Mishqah Parthiephal, actress
- Penelope Coelen, Miss South Africa 1958 and Miss world 1958
- Patricia Geary (née Hollows), Durban City Councillor 1962 - 1976.
- TDK Macassette, dancer, singer & radio host
