= Zulu Wedding =

2019 South African romantic comedy film

- Directed by: Lineo Sekeleoane
- Screenplay by: Julie Hall; Lineo Sekeleoane
- Based on: Zulu culture
- Produced by: Lineo Sekeleoane
- Starring: Nondumiso Tembe; Darrin Henson; Kelly Khumalo
- Music by: Raphael Fimm
- Release dates: 21 May 2017 (Cannes); 11 October 2019
- Running time: 123 minutes
- Country: South Africa
- Language: English

Zulu Wedding is a 2017 South African romantic comedy film produced, written and directed by Lineo Sekeleoane on her directorial debut. The film casts artists of South Africa, Nigeria and US. The film stars Nondumiso Tembe, Kelly Khumalo, Darrin Henson in the lead roles. The portions of the film were primarily shot in South Africa, New York and Botswana. The principal photography of the film underwent financial troubles especially when the production team announced its release date in 2017. The release was later postponed on 23 February 2018. The producer cleared the financial issues in mid 2019 and the film had its theatrical release on 11 October 2019.

== Cast ==
- Darrin Henson as Tex Wilson
- Nondumiso Tembe as Lu Sabata
- Carl Anthony Payne II as Nate
- Pallance Dladla as Zulu
- Makgano Mamabolo as Mabo
- Kgomotso Christopher as Rene
- Kelly Khumalo as Yvonne Sabata
- Bubu Mazibuko as Sam
- Lorcia Cooper as Marang

== Synopsis ==
A beautiful young dancer Lu Sabata (Nondumiso Tembe) who moves to US from her motherland South Africa in order to pursue her career in dancing, falls in love with Tex Wilson (Darrin Henson), a New York based man. However a complication is caused due to the family background of Lu who is from the royal Zulu family and is determined to fulfill her aspirations in the US, but is bound by an ancestral debt to marry a Zulu royal family member.
