= Asavela Mqokiyana =

South African actress

- Born: Asavela Mngqithi; 4 June 1996 (age 30); Durban, KwaZulu-Natal, South Africa
- Occupations: Actress, Model, Director
- Years active: 2018–present
- Spouse: Thabo Mqokiyana (m. 2022; div. 2024)
- Children: 1
- Father: Manqoba Mngqithi

Asavela Mqokiyana (née Mngqithi) is a South African actress and model.

She is best known for the roles in the television serials Isibaya and Abomama.

== Personal life ==
Mngqithi enrolled for a degree in camera and editing from the AFDA, The School for the Creative Economy (AFDA), but later dropped out after third year due to financial problems. Her father, Manqoba Mngqithi is a soccer coach. She has one younger sister.

She married to Thabo Mqokiyane in KwaBhaca in April 2022. The couple welcomed a daughter in August 2023. In February 2025, she confirmed that she was divorced.

== Career ==
In 2018, she made auditions for a role in the Mzansi Magic soap opera Isithembiso. However, she was then called back to audition for another Mzansi Magic soap opera Isibaya. She finally joined with the cast for the fifth season of the soapie and played the role "Ntwenhle". Her role became very popular, where she continued to play the role eighth and final season of the soapie in 2021.

After that in 2021, she made her second television role in season two of 1Magic drama series Abomama. In the series, she played the role of "Amogelang".

== Filmography ==
Year	Film	Role	Genre	Ref.
2018–2021	Isibaya	Ntwenhle Ndlovu	TV series	
2021	Abomama	Amogelang	TV series	
2023–present	Durban Gen	Amahle Dladla	TV series	
2025–Present	Uzalo	Sizakele	TV Sopie	
