= Xolile Tshabalala =

South African actress

- Born: Xolile Tshabalala; 9 April 1977 (age 49); Vrede, Free State
- Education: National School of the Arts Theatre; New York Film Academy
- Occupations: Director, producer, writer, editor
- Years active: 2002–present

Xolile Tshabalala (born 9 April 1977) is a South African actress. She is notable for her roles in several popular television series including 4Play: Sex Tips for Girls, Secrets & Scandals, Blood & Water, and Housekeepers.

== Personal life ==
She was born in Vrede, Free State. She is named after her paternal grandmother. She graduated from the National School of the Arts Theatre with honors and as well as 'Best Overall Performer'.

== Career ==
During her studies at National school, Xolile had the opportunity to play alongside Thembi Mtshali-Jones, where she became her mentor. They performed together in the play The Crucible shown at the Market Theatre. The actress has also starred in . She has also starred in a large number of Television productions such as, and Soul City season 7, where she played sister Zama. Not limited to on-screen acting, Xolile has also starred in various plays which include "Another Child".

In 2002 she started acting career with the television serial Generations. She played the role 'Julia Montene' from 2002 to 2005, which became highly popular among the public. Then in 2007, she joined with NCIS season 5 as 'Sayda Zuri', in the episode titled Designated Target. With the success in her roles, she became a household name in television productions such as Secret in my Bosom, Scoop Schoombie, Justice for All, Isidingo.

In 2005, she took a break from acting. Then she went United States to attend New York Film Academy. She returned South Africa in 2010 and played the role 'Noma' in the television serial 4Play: Sex Tips for Girls. Then she played a bang landing the role of 'Mandi Mbalula' in the serial Fallen, a 2011 drama series. In 2013, Xolile appeared as 'Gugu' in High Rollers which aired on SABC 3.

She has nominated several award ceremonies for various roles especially at South African Film and Television Awards. In 2006, she was nominated for Golden Horn Award for Best Supporting Actress for her role in Generations. Then in 2012, nominated for the Golden Horn Award for Best Supporting Actress for her role in Fallen. In next year, she again nominated for the Golden Horn Award for Best Actress in a Lead Role for her role in 4Play: Sex Tips for Girls. In 2016, she was nominated for the Golden Horn Award for Best Achievement by a Lead Actress for her role in television movie Rise.

In 2020, she played the role 'Nwabisa Bhele' in the Netflix original series Blood & Water. The series became one of the most rated television serials in South Africa.

== Filmography ==
| Year | Film | Role | Genre | Ref. |
|---|---|---|---|---|
| 2002 | Generations | Julia Montene | TV series | |
| 2005 | Rift | | Video short | |
| 2007 | NCIS | Sayda Zuri | TV series | |
| 2007 | 90 Plein Street | Precious | TV series | |
| 2007 | Jacob's Cross | Busi | TV series | |
| 2007 | Rhythm City | Stella | TV series | |
| 2008 | Hard Copy | Teacher | TV series | |
| 2008 | Sokhulu & Partners | Nosipho Nokwe | TV series | |
| 2010 | 4Play: Sex Tips for Girls | Noma | TV series | |
| 2010 | Intersexions | Doctor | TV series | |
| 2011 | Fallen | Mandi Mbalula | TV series | |
| 2011 | Muvhango | Senamile | TV series | |
| 2013 | High Roller | Gugu Mogale | TV series | |
| 2014 | Kota Life Crisis | Hlengiwe | TV series | |
| 2014 | Soul City | Sister Zama | TV series | |
| 2015 | Rise | Fezeka Dlamini | TV series | |
| 2017 | Miraculous Weapons | Lesedi, producer | Film | |
| 2017 | Secrets & Scandals | Felicia Okpara | TV series | |
| 2018 | Ingozi | Angela Ndamase | TV series | |
| 2020 | Blood & Water | Nwabisa Bhele | TV series | |
| 2020 | Housekeepers | Noluthando Ngubane | TV series | |
| 2024 | Blood Legacy | Khanyi Adesina | TV series | |
