= Amy Jacot Guillarmod =

South African botanist

- Born: Amy Hean; 23 May 1911; Hillcrest, KwaZulu-Natal
- Died: 1992
- Education: M.A. M.Sc. D.Sc.
- Alma mater: University of St Andrews
- Spouse: Charles Frédéric Jacot-Guillarmod
- Scientific career
- Author abbrev. (botany): Jacot Guill

Amy Frances May Gordon Jacot Guillarmod (née Hean) (23 May 1911 – 1992), was a South African botanist and limnologist, noted for her work on the flora of Basutoland and some 200 publications, including numerous papers on wetlands, bogs and sponges.

== Education and academic career ==
She matriculated at the Durban Girls' High School, leaving for Edinburgh shortly after.

Jacot Guillarmod was awarded an MA in English and History at the University of St Andrews, but inspired by D'Arcy Wentworth Thompson, switched interests and started an MSc degree in Botany and Zoology at the same university. On her return to South Africa, she taught briefly in Durban and was then appointed plant pathologist in the Division of Botany and Plant Pathology of the Department of Agriculture in Pretoria. Her first papers dealt with the viral diseases of tobacco and other crops.

She spent the years between 1940 and 1957 in Basutoland. In 1956/7 she became Head of the Botany Department of the Pius XII College in Roma. Jacot Guillarmod founded the Roma Herbarium in 1956.

In 1958 she and her family moved to Grahamstown when she took up an appointment as lecturer in the Botany Department of Rhodes University. Her links with Basutoland were not forgotten, and in 1967 she received a DSc from the University of St Andrews for her research on the flora of Basutoland.

She is commemorated in Merxmuellera guillarmodiae Conert, Navicula jacotiae F.R. Schoeman, Pinnularia guillarmodiae F.R. Schoeman and a number of other organisms. Volume 50, part 1 (1988) of The Flowering Plants of Africa was dedicated to her. Her specimens number some 10 000 and are mainly from Lesotho and the Eastern Cape, housed at the following herbaria: PREM, PRE, RUH, GRA, MASE, K and MO. (Note: see List of herbaria)

== Personal notes ==
During her stay in Pretoria in the 1930s when working for the Department of Agriculture, she found time to play hockey, and represented Northern Transvaal. During the same period she met a fellow employee and her future husband, the entomologist Charles Frédéric Jacot-Guillarmod (1912–1979), who later became curator of the Albany Museum. She shared Linnaeus's birthday and was noted for a joint annual celebration. Despite the other members of her family hyphenating their name, she insisted on not doing so.

== Works ==
- Jacot-Guillarmod, Amy (1962). "The Flora of Basutoland: 3. Water Plants and Waterside Plants". Basutoland Notes and Records. 3: 7–15.
- Jacot Guillarmod, A. (1971). Flora of Lesotho (Basutoland). Lubrecht & Cramer. ISBN 978-3-7682-0719-5.
- Jacot Guillarmod, Amy (1975). Limnological Bibliography for Africa South of the Sahara. Grahamstown: Institute for Freshwater Studies, Rhodes University.
