= Dawn Thandeka King =

South African actress

- Born: Dawn Thandeka King; 1 October 1977 (age 48); Eshowe, KwaZulu-Natal, South Africa
- Occupations: Actress; Musician; Motivational Speaker
- Years active: 2012–present
- Notable work: Uzalo; Lockdown; Diep City
- Spouse: Jabulani Msomi (m. 2002; div. 2017)
- Partner: Mlungisi Duncan
- Children: 5

Dawn Thandeka King (born 1 October 1977) is a South african actress, musician, motivational speaker and social media influencer from Eshowe, KwaZulu-Natal. Dawn Thandeka King is best known for her former role as MaNgcobo on the South African soap opera Uzalo. King portrayed the role of MaNgcobo for almost 7 years.

== Early life ==
Dawn Thandeka King was born in Eshowe, KwaZulu-Natal. After finishing her matric, she went on to complete her drama studies at Technikon Natal (now known as DUT).

== Career ==
Before King's breakthrough in the acting industry, she was working a 9–5 job in the tourism industry around Durban. She eventually quit her job in the tourism industry to pursue her acting career and her debut in the acting industry came in 2012 where she got a role in Mzansi Magic's telenovela Inkaba. A few years later she portrayed the role of Lindiwe Xulu (Mangcobo) on a telenovela broadcast on SABC1 television show Uzalo from 2015 to 2021. Her character was well received by the audience with King receiving praise for her acting skills. She starred in the telenovela Lockdown on Mzansi Magic where she was known as Mazet. She is also seen in Mzansi Bioskop short Zulu drama's persuading her dream career.

In 2021, after she left Uzalo she joined a new telenova called DiepCity to play a leading role.

== Filmography ==
Year	Film	Role
2012-2014	Inkaba	Mam Ngcobo
2014- 2022	Uzalo	Lindiwe "MaNgcobo" Xulu/Mhlongo
2015	Lockdown	2016-2022
2022-2023	DiepCity	Thandiwe MaShenge Jele
2023	I Am All Girls	Zama
2023	King Shaka	Mkabayi(voice)
2023-2024	Isitha: The Enemy	Nomcebo Ngwenya
2023	Miseducation	Principal
2023–Present	Shaka iLembe	Mkabayi kaJama
2024	Queendom	Queen MaNdlovu Khahlamba
2024–Present	Blood Legacy	Liyana Vezi
2025	GO!	Elsbeth
2025	Black Gold	Florence Zungu

== Personal life ==
King is a mother of five children. She was married to Durban-based businessman Jabulani Msomi for 15 years until their marriage ended on 2017.

== Accolades ==
- She won a SAFTA for Best Actress in a lead role in a TV Drama (Lockdown)
- She was nominated as Favourite Actress at 2020 DStv Mzansi Viewers' Choice Awards.
- She won KZN Entertainment Awards in Best Actress category 2020.

=== Simon Sabela KZN Film & TV Awards ===
Year	Nominee / work	Award	Result	Ref.
2024	Shaka iLembe	Best Supporting Actress TV	Nominated	
