= Blood Legacy (TV series) =

2024 South African TV series

- Genre: Drama
- Created by: Diego Gutierrez
- Based on: Monarca by Diego Gutiérrez
- Directed by: Nozipho Nkelemba
- Starring: Xolile Tshabalala; Buyile Mdladla; Connie Chiume; Anthony Oseyemi; Mike Ndlangamandla; Treasure Nkosi; Dineo Rasedile; Unathi Mkhize; Pallance Dladla; Enhle Mbali Mlotshwa; Wiseman Zitha
- Country of origin: South Africa
- Original language: Zulu
- No. of seasons: 1
- No. of episodes: 20

Production
- Executive producers: Bradley Joshua; Benjamin Overmeyer; Travis Taute
- Editors: Tanja Hagen; Paul Martin van Wyk; Nomfundo Lucia Masango
- Production company: Gambit Films

Original release
- Network: Netflix
- Release: September 20, 2024 – present

Blood Legacy is a 2024 South African drama television series created and written by Diego Gutiérrez for Netflix. Adapted from the series Monarca, the show was produced by Gambit Films and premiered on September 20, 2024, with twenty episodes. The series stars Xolile Tshabalala as Khanyi Adesina and Anthony Oseyemi as Akin Adesina. Blood Legacy follows Khanyi returning home to take control of her family’s business empire, which is on the verge of collapse due to corruption. Executive producers of the series include Bradley Joshua, Benjamin Overmeyer, Nosipho Dumisa-Ngoasheng, Daryne Joshua, Travis Taute, and Simon Beesley. Actress and producer Connie Chiume passed away after the production of the first season.

== Premise ==
Khanyi Adesina, the daughter of a prominent business magnate and head of Spear Industries—a sugarcane company mired in corruption allegations—is unexpectedly invited back by her father. To rehabilitate the company's tarnished image, he offers her the position of CEO, claiming he wants her leadership to root out corruption within the organization.

Her return disrupts the delicate balance of the Ndlovu family. Khanyi's siblings, particularly Siya Ndlovu, resent her appointment, feeling they deserve control because they have dedicated themselves to the company while she chose to leave. Tensions reach a boiling point when their father is discovered dead in the sugarcane fields, throwing the family into a fierce battle for control of Spear Industries.

As Khanyi navigates a treacherous world of corporate intrigue and betrayal, she grapples with whether she can stay true to herself or be reshaped entirely by the ruthless corporate landscape.

== Cast ==
- Xolile Tshabalala as Khanyi Adesina
- Amar Mthwana as Young Khanyi Adesina
- Anthony Oseyemi as Akin Adesina
- Buyile Mdladla as Mandla Ndlovu
- Mike Ndlangamandla as Siya Ndlovu
- Connie Chiume as Madlamini Ndlovu
- Treasure Nkosi as Bhekisizwe Ndlovu
- Dineo Rasedile as Amahle Adesina
- Unathi Mkhize as Njabulo Adesina
- Pallance Dladla as Zahhele Ndlovu
- Enhle Mbali Mlotshwa as Gabisile Ndlovu
- Wiseman Zitha as Lungelo Blanco
- Thabiso Ramotshela as Nido Ndlovu
- Nandipa Khubone as Thuli Ndlovu
- Bonga Dlamini as Dumisani Khumalo
- Michael Everson as Sean Conners
- Razeen Dada as Gibran Murad
- Dawn Thandeka King as Liyana Vezi
- Maud Adams as Msizi
- Jerry Mofokeng as Tumi Mashishi
- Rashid Mlongo as News Reporter
- Sonwabili Banisi as Cape Town Cop

== Episodes ==
No.	Title	Directed by	Written by	Original release date
1	"The Call"	Nozipho Nkelemba	Bradley Katzen	September 20, 2024
When her estranged father asks her to come home, journalist Khanyi learns he plans to make her the CEO of Spear Industries, the family business.
2	"The Pruning"	Nozipho Nkelemba	Kurt Ellis	September 20, 2024
Khanyi weighs her father's offer after a confrontation with her brother Mandla, but a death in the family changes everything.
3	"The Wake"	Nozipho Nkelemba	Sandulela Asanda	September 20, 2024
The Ndlovu siblings mourn their loss while trying to hide the details of what happened from family members, friends and the authorities.
4	"The Will"	Nozipho Nkelemba	Bonie Sithebe	September 20, 2024
As the family gathers for the funeral, Khanyi learns who she's up against. Her mother, Madlamini, is left with a difficult choice.
5	"Descent"	Marvin-Lee Beukes	Caroline Doherty	September 20, 2024
A violent attack on the company forces Khanyi to hold her own against a powerful gang. Gabisile grooms Siya to take over as CEO.
6	"The Choice"	Marvin-Lee Beukes	Bradley Katzen	September 20, 2024
Thuli is on a mission to buy a house. Khanyi makes a bet with Mandla to resolve the drivers' strike and get sugarcane deliveries back on track.
7	"The Coronation"	Nthabiseng Mokoena	Kurt Ellis	September 20, 2024
Khanyi's first day as CEO of Spear is immediately undermined by Mandla. At her boarding school, Amahle sees Nido's true colors.
8	"Filthy Rich"	Nthabiseng Mokoena	Sandulela Asanda	September 20, 2024
Feeling left behind, Akin considers an offer to dig into the Ndlovu family. Mandla hatches a plan to bring down Khanyi — and Spear along with her.
9	"The Anniversary"	Nthabiseng Mokoena	Bonie Sithebe	September 20, 2024
Following an act of sabotage, Khanyi reaches out to Zakhele for help with Spear's 25th anniversary celebrations. Siya is torn between love and duty.
10	"All that Glitters"	Nozipho Nkelemba	Caroline Doherty	September 20, 2024
Tensions rise at the anniversary party as the Ndlovu siblings continue to snipe at each other. Amahle catches Nido in a compromising position.
11	"The Lion's Den"	Nozipho Nkelemba	Bradley Katzen	September 20, 2024
Khanyi becomes entangled in the public outcry against Nido, while Mandla tries to negotiate with the A6, only to realize he's in over his head quickly.
12	"A Deal with the Devil"	Bonie Sithebe	Kurt Ellis	September 20, 2024
Fed up with being sidelined, Lungelo ends the relationship with Siya. Amahle bravely reveals the truth about what she witnessed, while Akin faces mounting pressure from his editor.
13	"Fight or Flight"	Marvin-Lee Beukes	Sandulela Asanda	September 20, 2024
As Spear struggles with scandal and debt, Khanyi arranges an asset sale that puts Siya in a difficult position. Meanwhile, Amahle faces ridicule upon her return to school.
14	"Crossroads"	Marvin-Lee Beukes	Bonie Sithebe	September 20, 2024
As the sugarcane fields go up in flames, Khanyi finds herself under intense pressure. Siya sends Nido overseas, while the A6 pulls Mandla into a plot for a political assassination.
15	"Coup d'état"	Marvin-Lee Beukes	Caroline Doherty	September 20, 2024
Thuli uncovers the truth behind her mother's suicide, while Akin confronts Khanyi over suspicions of her infidelity. Meanwhile, Gabisile delivers an ultimatum to Siya.
16	"Revelations"	Bonie Sithebe	Bradley Katzen	September 20, 2024
With Dumi's assistance, Khanyi moves closer to uncovering her father's murderer. Meanwhile, Mandla is forced to take the fall for the assassination attempt.
17	"The Time for Truth"	Bonie Sithebe	Kurt Ellis	September 20, 2024
Hoping to prompt Nido into revealing the truth, Siya confesses his own. Meanwhile, Zakhele reprimands Mandla for his reckless actions.
18	"Judas"	Bonie Sithebe	Sandulela Asanda	September 20, 2024
As Khanyi retraces her father's final moments, she uncovers the identity of his killer. Meanwhile, Gabisile sows discord between Siya and Nido.
19	"House of Cards"	Nozipho Nkelemba	Bonie Sithebe	September 20, 2024
As the police and the A6 close in, Mandla makes a desperate attempt to set things right. Meanwhile, Khanyi leaks incriminating documents to the press, triggering deadly consequences.
20	"The Harvest"	Nozipho Nkelemba	Caroline Doherty	September 20, 2024
With the fate of Spear and the Ndlovu family at stake, Khanyi confronts her father's murderer — but the killer still has one last move to make.

== Production ==
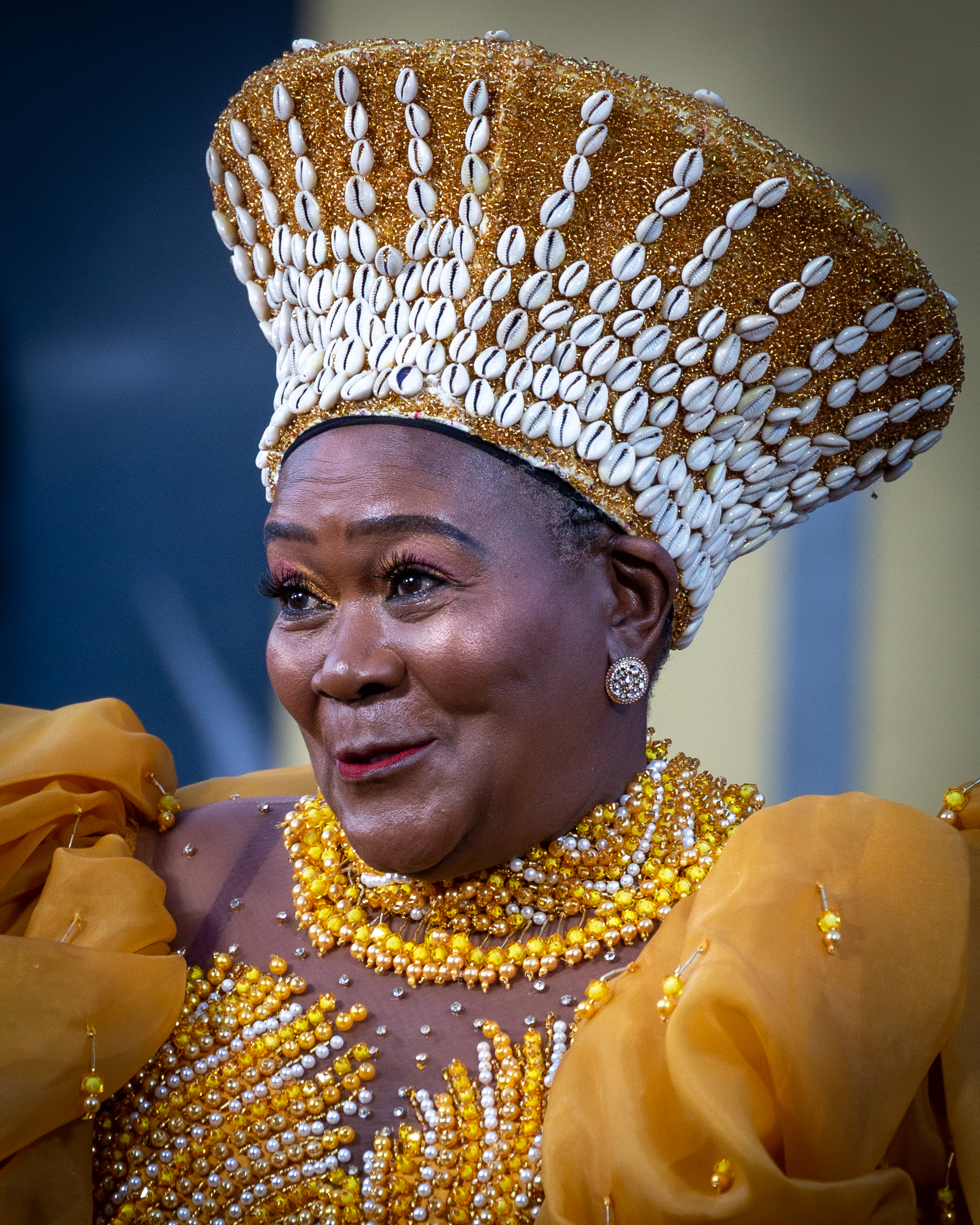
Connie Chiume passed away during the final stages of production for the show's first season.

In August 2024, Netflix announced the green light to release Blood Legacy, an adaptation of the 2019 Spanish crime thriller series Monarca, created by Diego Gutiérrez. The new version featured an entirely fresh cast, predominantly South African actors, differing from the original series. A 4-minute teaser for the show was released on August 28, 2024, followed by the official trailer on September 5, 2024. Actress and producer Connie Chiume passed away during the final stages of production for the first season.

On September 12, 2024, Truelove Magazine interviewed the cast of Blood Legacy. The interview featured Xolile Tshabalala, who portrayed Khanyisile Adesina; Buyile Mdladla, who played Mandla Ndlovu; and Mike Ndlangamandla, who played Siya Ndlovu. During the discussion, Xolile Tshabalala spoke about her character, highlighting Khanyisile’s complexity and the gradual evolution of her personality throughout the series. She stated:

"One minute you can see her vulnerability, then when the fire – I mean, she’s a slow burn. She doesn’t just suddenly become this powerful person. She starts easy, and she loves her kids, she loves her husband. Life happens, somebody else comes along."

== Release ==
Blood Legacy was released on September 20, 2024, exclusively on Netflix.

== Reception ==
Pramit Chatterjee of DMTalkies remarked, "When it comes to the technical aspects of Blood Legacy, the lighting, production design, and costumes are passable. That’s about the only praise I can give the show. Everything else is a disaster. The editing is nearly criminal—scenes start and end abruptly, only to return to the same point later without any clear purpose. For instance, there's a conversation between Siya and Madlamini about Siya's sexuality, which should have been emotionally charged. Instead, the episode cuts away to something unrelated, only to awkwardly return to the conversation minutes later." He added, "I feel bad for the cast of Blood Legacy. They are undoubtedly talented, but the poor writing around their characters prevents their individual and collective efforts from elevating the material."

Mbali Mbatha of City Press described the season as "realistic," praising the cast for their performances throughout all 20 episodes. She specifically highlighted Connie Chiume's acting, stating:

"But one thing about the late small-screen queen—give her any character, and she will do it justice. Watching her portray the wife of a tycoon reminded me of the stunning outfits she wore on global red carpets. I concluded that bowing out with a character that aligned with the fashionista she was made for such a powerful exit."

Mbatha further commended the series, saying: "Hats off to the team for introducing a character that speaks directly to many other Black South African women and me. Growing up, we were taught to endure mistreatment from toxic parents because our blessings were said to be in their hands. Cutting them off was viewed as inviting curses and failure. The 'good Sis' in the show, however, pursued an MBA, is successful in her career, happily married, and raising healthy and happy children."
