= Aubrey Sekhabi =

Writer and director from South Africa

Aubrey W. Sekhabi
- Born: Soshanguve, Gauteng, South Africa
- Education: University of the Witwatersrand
- Occupations: playwright, director, and artistic director
- Children: Shalate Sekhabi
- Family: Wanda Zuma (son in-law)
- Awards: Best Director at Naledi Theatre Awards 2015 Most original production at FNB Vita Award (1994) Standard Bank Young Artist Award 1998

Aubrey W. Sekhabi is a South African playwright, director, and artistic director of the South African State Theatre. He has made significant contributions to the theater industry and has been recognized with numerous awards and accolades.

== Early and personal life ==
Aubrey's passion for the arts began at a young age. He was born and raised in South Africa and developed a love for theater and storytelling. He pursued his education at the University of the Witwatersrand in 1988. At 15, he penned his first play and by 2002, he became the artistic director at the South African State Theatre (SAST). Aubrey's daughter is Shalate Sekhabi, an actress and a singer.

== Controversy ==
Employees accused Aubrey of corruption, verbal and sexual harassment and unjust dismissals. An anonymous letter was sent to the Department of Arts and Culture seeking intervention. Aubrey denied the accusations, dismissing them as a smear campaign.

== Notable productions ==
- Silent Voice - Is an original play written and directed by Aubrey, delves into the gripping tale of four men entangled in a failed robbery turned deadly, navigating a high-stakes fight for survival. It was first devised in 1992.
- Marikana - The Musical - A play adapted from the book "We Are Going to Kill Each Other Today: The Marikana Story". In 2015, at the Naledi Theatre Awards, the production received nominations across 18 categories and won in six, following its stage premiere in 2014.
- Freedom - The Musical (2020) - Won the Best Score/Arrangement/Adaptation award at Naledi Theatre Awards.
- Sophiatown
- Rivonia Trial - He won the best director awards in Naledi Theatre Awards 2019.

== Awards and recognition ==
- Best Director at Naledi Theatre Awards 2015 for Marikana: The Musical.
- Standard Bank Young Artist Award 1998 (Drama).
- Most original production at FNB Vita Award (1994) for Mika.
