= Zimiphi Biyela =

South African actress and presenter

- Born: Zimiphi Happiness Biyela; 24 February 1983 (age 43); King Cetshwayo, South Africa
- Other names: Zim Dollar
- Education: St Paul‟s Primary School; Sitheku High School
- Occupations: Actress, Television presenter, Singer, MC, Radio DJ, Motivational speaker
- Years active: 2008–present
- Children: 1

Zimiphi Happiness Biyela (born 24 February 1983), popularly known as Zim Dollar, is a South African actress, television presenter, singer, MC, radio DJ and motivational speaker. She is best known for the roles in the television serials such as; Uzalo, Durban Gen and eHostela

== Personal life ==
Biyela was born on 24 February 1983 in eNdabazensangu under King Cetshwayo District, Obuka, South Africa as one of the twin and third child in a family with six siblings. She completed primary education from St Paul‟s Primary School in Nkwenkwe. Then she attended to Sitheku High School for secondary education and matriculated in 2001. She then enrolled with a bachelor's degree in education from the University of South Africa (Unisa). She studied two years in the university, but did not complete the degree.

She is a mother of a son born on 16 April 2007.

== Career ==
She started career as a dancer at Mbongeni Ngema Committed Artists. At that time, she also worked as the lead vocalist and actress for the company. She continued to work for the company for three years. Then she became as a teacher at Ohlelo Combined School in Nkandla. In the meantime, she released her first afro-pop album "Kwaze Kwamnandi" in 2009. Then in 2010, she started news reading at Icora FM while working as a teacher. In 2011, she got the opportunity to join with the Ukhozi FM radio presenter search.

In 2014, she made her television acting debut with SABC 1 drama serial Uzalo. In the serial, she played the role of "Samukelisiwe Keke Nzuza". Her role became very popular among the public, where she was nominated for the Best Actress category in the Sabela Mabhunu Awards in 2016. In the meantime, she hosted the Ukhozi FM programs; Ikhethelo loKhozi, Sibhukuda Kwesimanzonzo, Kwasa Okungaliyo, Ezamabandla and Sigiya Ngengoma. In 2020, she joined with the cast of e.tv. medical serial Durban Gen and played the role "Matron Nkabinde".

Apart from acting and music, she is an entrepreneur invested in taxi Industry.
