= Meshack Mavuso =

South African actor (born 1977)

Meshack Mavuso Magabane
- Born: Meshack Mavuso Magabane; 8 March 1977 (age 49); Johannesburg, South Africa
- Occupations: Actor, director
- Years active: 1998–present

Meshack Mavuso Magabane (born 8 March 1977) is a South African actor and director. He is best known for his roles in the popular serials Heist, Isidingo, Yizo Yizo, Isithembiso and Durban gen as Dr Thabo Dlamini.

== Personal life ==
He was born on 8 April 1977 in Mandagsoek Limpopo, South Africa.

He is married and is a father of four children.

== Career ==
In 1998 he made a lead role 'Vusi Moletsane' in the popular soapie Isidingo which became highly popular. Then, he appeared in the drama series Yizo Yizo which aired from 1999 to 2004 with the role 'Jabulani "Javas" Nyembe'.

He also gained fame when he joined the Mzansi Magic telenovela Isithembiso which premiered on 3 April 2017, where he played the character of Keromemang Mtimande, the father of Tshepo, who was kept as a secret to his father by her mother until he mysteriously discovered to have a child with his ex-girlfriend Chlodea who now dates his enemy.

He started his career as Meshack Mavuso and played the role 'Simiso Mtshali' in the second and third seasons of the police procedural series Zero Tolerance aired in SABC2. Before these credited roles, he played a different uncredited characters in the first season. In 2008, he was one of the celebrity dancers in the Dancing New Year Special Strictly Come, which aired on 31 December 2008.

In 2009, he made a supportive cameo appearance on the first season of the genealogy documentary series Who Do You Think You Are? which was based on the British series of the same name. The serial was aired on SABC2 in 2009. In 2014, he returned to television acting with a guest role in two episodes of the AIDS drama Soul City in which he played as a 'doctor'. In 2015, for the first time, he used the name Mavuso Magabane for the television serial Zabalaza. In the serial, he played a guest role in one episode. In 2016 he made his second lead role in the e.tv robbery drama Heist with the role 'Chairperson'.

In 2020 after a short stint in the serial The River, he joined the cast of the serial Durban Gen where he plays the character of Dr Thabo Dlamini who is portrayed as a womanizer and is married to Dr Precious Dlamini.

== Filmography ==
Year	Title	Role	Genre	Ref.
1998	Isidingo	Vusi Moletsane	TV series	
1999	Yizo Yizo	Javas	Film	
1999	Portrait of a Young Man Drowning	Captured Man	Short film	
2000	Hijack Stories	Papplas man	Film	
2009	Who Do You Think You Are?	Cameo role	TV series	
2014	Soul City	Doctor	TV series	
2015	Zabalaza	Cameo role	TV series	
2016	Heist	Chairperson	TV series	
2020–2023	Durban Gen	Dr. Thabo Dlamini	TV series	
2023–2026	Smoke & Mirrors	Mayor Jaxon Mkhize	TV series	
2026	eGagasini - Waves of Change	Senzo Dube	TV series	
