= Lockdown (South African TV series) =

- Genre: Drama
- Created by: Mandla Ngcongwane
- Written by: Reabetswe Moeti; Mandla N.; Byron Abrahams; Tsepo Desando; Dominique Masson; Lwazi Mvusi; Tiffany Barbuzano; Meren Reddy
- Directed by: Mandla Ngcongwane
- Starring: Lorcia Cooper; Zola Nombona; Dawn Thandeka King; Pamela Nomvete; Tichina Arnold; Mmabatho Montsho; Linda Sebezo; Linda Khumbanyiwa; Stevel Marc
- Country of origin: South Africa
- No. of seasons: 5
- No. of episodes: 62

Production
- Camera setup: Multi-camera
- Running time: 30:00 (incl. commercials)

Original release
- Network: Mzansi Magic
- Release: 9 January 2017 – 1 January 2018
- Network: 1Magic
- Release: 7 July 2018 – 29 June 2019
- Network: Showmax (streaming)

Lockdown is a South African crime drama television series created and directed by Mandla Ngcongwane that premiered on 9 January 2017 on Mzansi Magic (televised) and Showmax (streaming) then later moved to 1Magic.

The series aired its first season and second season on Mzansi Magic, moved to 1Magic for its third and fourth seasons and later moved back to Mzansi to air the fifth and final season.

== Production ==
=== Filming ===
Principal filming for the series took place in Constitution Hill in Johannesburg.

=== Music ===
The original score was produced by Mandla N, Jamela Vuma and Kurt Slabbert, under BlackBrain Music. Vocals were done by Nelisiwe Sibiya, Bongo Riot, Ikati Esengxoweni, Zola Nombona, Max-Hoba, Slindile Nodangala, Carol Babalwa Djieutcheu, Dawn Thandeka King and Phindile Thango. The album was officially released to music streaming platforms in 2018, after a private screening of the season 3 finale, alongside a music video for the lead single, Mama Ka Bafana.

== Reception ==
=== Awards and nominations ===
List of Accolades
| Award / Film Festival | Year | Recipient | Nomination | Result | Ref. |
|---|---|---|---|---|---|
| South African Film and Television Awards | 2018 | Babalwa Mtshiselwa | Best Achievement in Make-up and Hairstyling - TV Drama | Won | |
| South African Film and Television Awards | 2018 | Amanda Van Wyngaardt | Best Achievement in Art / Design Production - TV Drama | Nominated | |
| South African Film and Television Awards | 2018 | Lockdown | Best Achievement in Cinematography (TV Drama) | Nominated | |
| South African Film and Television Awards | 2018 | Reabetswe Moeti | Best Achievement in Scriptwriting - TV Drama | Won | |
| South African Film and Television Awards | 2019 | DramaGisellah Gay McLeod | Best Achievement in Costume Design - TV | Won | |
| South African Film and Television Awards | 2019 | Babalwa Mtshiselwa | Best Achievement in Make-up and Hairstyling - TV Drama | Won | |
| South African Film and Television Awards | 2019 | Reabetswe Moeti; Thishiwe Ziqubu; Karabo Lediga | Best Achievement in Directing - TV Drama | Nominated | |
| South African Film and Television Awards | 2019 | Reabetswe Moeti | Best Achievement in Scriptwriting - TV Drama | Nominated | |
| South African Film and Television Awards | 2019 | Pamela Nomvete | Best Supporting Actress - TV Drama | Nominated | |
| South African Film and Television Awards | 2019 | Zola Nombona | Best Actress - TV Drama | Nominated | |
| South African Film and Television Awards | 2019 | Lockdown | Best TV Drama | Won | |
| South African Film and Television Awards | 2019 | Lorcia Cooper | Best Supporting Actress - TV Drama | Won | |
| South African Film and Television Awards | 2019 | Dawn Thandeka King | Best Actress - TV Drama | Won | |
| South African Film and Television Awards | 2020 | Gaopie Kabe | Best Achievement in Cinematography - TV Drama | Nominated | |
| South African Film and Television Awards | 2020 | Gisellah Gay McLeod | Best Achievement in Costume Design - TV Drama | Nominated | |
| South African Film and Television Awards | 2020 | Lockdown | Best Achievement in Art / Design Production - TV Drama | Nominated | |
| South African Film and Television Awards | 2020 | Kurt Slabbert; Mohammed Rashid; Juma Al-Hameli; Mandla Ngcongwane | Best Achievement in Original Score - TV Drama | Nominated | |
| South African Film and Television Awards | 2020 | Byron Abrahams; Mandla Ngcongwane; Dominique Masson; Tiffany Barbuzano; Lwazi Mvusi; Tsepo Desando; Meren Reddy | Best Achievement in Scriptwriting - TV Drama | Nominated | |
| South African Film and Television Awards | 2020 | Mandla N. | Best Achievement in Directing - TV Drama | Nominated | |
| South African Film and Television Awards | 2020 | Pamela Nomvete | Best Supporting Actress - TV Drama | Nominated | |
| South African Film and Television Awards | 2020 | Lorcia Cooper | Best Supporting Actress - TV Drama | Nominated | |
| South African Film and Television Awards | 2020 | Zola Nombona | Best Actress - TV Drama | Nominated | |
| South African Film and Television Awards | 2020 | Dawn Thandeka King | Best Actress - TV Drama | Nominated | |
| South African Film and Television Awards | 2020 | Lockdown | Best TV Drama | Nominated | |
| South African Film and Television Awards | 2021 | Babalwa Mtshiselwa | Best Achievement in Make-up and Hairstyling - TV Drama | Nominated | |
| South African Film and Television Awards | 2021 | Kurt Slabbert; Jamela Vuma; Mandla Ngcongwane | Best Achievement in Original Score - TV Drama | Won | |
| South African Film and Television Awards | 2021 | Kurt Slabbert | Best Achievement in Sound Design - TV Drama | Nominated | |
| South African Film and Television Awards | 2021 | Mandla N. | Best Achievement in Directing - TV Drama | Nominated | |
| South African Film and Television Awards | 2021 | Zola Nombona | Best Supporting Actress - TV Drama | Nominated | |
| South African Film and Television Awards | 2021 | Lockdown | Best TV Drama | Nominated | |

== Series overview ==
| Series | Episodes | Originally released | | |
| Series | Episodes | First released | Last released | Network |
|---|---|---|---|---|
| 1 | 13 | 9 January 2017 | 3 April 2017 | Mzansi Magic |
| 2 | 13 | 9 October 2017 | 1 January 2018 | Mzansi Magic |
| 3 | 13 | 7 July 2018 | 29 September 2018 | 1Magic |
| 4 | 13 | 6 April 2019 | 29 June 2019 | 1Magic |
| 5 | 10 | 6 April 2020 | 8 June 2020 | Mzansi Magic |

== Episodes ==
=== Season 1 (2017) ===
| No. overall | No. in season | Title | Directed by | Written by | Original release date | South Africa viewers (millions) |
|---|---|---|---|---|---|---|
| 1 | 1 | "Episode 1" | – | – | 9 January 2017 | N/A |
| 2 | 2 | "Episode 2" | – | – | 16 January 2017 | N/A |
| 3 | 3 | "Episode 3" | – | – | 23 January 2017 | N/A |
| 4 | 4 | "Episode 4" | – | – | 30 January 2017 | N/A |
| 5 | 5 | "Episode 5" | – | – | 6 February 2017 | N/A |
| 6 | 6 | "Episode 6" | – | – | 13 February 2017 | N/A |
| 7 | 7 | "Episode 7" | – | – | 20 February 2017 | N/A |
| 8 | 8 | "Episode 8" | – | – | 27 February 2017 | N/A |
| 9 | 9 | "Episode 9" | – | – | 6 March 2017 | N/A |
| 10 | 10 | "Episode 10" | – | – | 13 March 2017 | N/A |
| 11 | 11 | "Episode 11" | – | – | 20 March 2017 | N/A |
| 12 | 12 | "Episode 12" | – | – | 27 March 2017 | N/A |
| 13 | 13 | "Episode 13" | – | – | 3 April 2017 | N/A |

=== Season 5 (2020) ===
| No. overall | No. in season | Title | Directed by | Written by | Original release date | South Africa viewers (millions) |
|---|---|---|---|---|---|---|
| 53 | 1 | "New Prison Threat" | – | – | 6 April 2020 | N/A |
| 54 | 2 | "Peace Offering" | – | – | 13 April 2020 | N/A |
| 55 | 3 | "Battle of the Smarts" | – | – | 20 April 2020 | N/A |
| 56 | 4 | "Who Let the Dogs Out" | – | – | 27 April 2020 | N/A |
| 57 | 5 | "New Love" | – | – | 4 May 2020 | N/A |
| 58 | 6 | "All Hell Breaks Loose" | – | – | 11 May 2020 | N/A |
| 59 | 7 | "Are We Done Yet?" | – | – | 18 May 2020 | N/A |
| 60 | 8 | "It's Israel's House" | – | – | 25 May 2020 | N/A |
| 61 | 9 | "What Have We Done?" | – | – | 1 June 2020 | N/A |
| 62 | 10 | "Happily Ever After?" | – | – | 8 June 2020 | N/A |
