= Gcina Nkosi =

South African actress

- Born: Gcina Nkosiwethu; 1969 (age 56–57); Umlazi, South Africa
- Other names: Zinzile Ngema
- Occupations: Actress, model
- Years active: 1969–present

Gcina Nkosi (born 1969) is a South African actress. She is best known for her role 'Zinzile Ngema' in the popular television soap opera Scandal!.

== Personal life ==
She was born in 1969 in Umlazi, KwaZulu-Natal, South Africa as the youngest of the family with six siblings. Her father was a politician who spent a long time in prison. Therefore, she could not grow up with her father. Her mother was a cleaner and a site steward at a factory. She grew up with her mother and grandmother. In 1987, her father died a few months after being released from prison. Her mother died in 2007 after a brief illness.

After school education, she attended Durban University of Technology (DUT) to pursue a drama career. However, after the first year, she quit the university due to financial problems.

== Career ==
With the ambition to be an actress, she went The Playhouse in Durban for an audition for a stage play Skwiza. The play was about women and drug abuse. In the meantime, she also excelled classical singing and contemporary dancing as well. She then played the roles of 'Lady McBeth' and 'Intombi' in the stage play Mabatha.

In 2009, she joined the original cast of Scandal! and played one of the lead role of 'Zinzile Ngema'. With the series become highly popular, she continued to play the role for almost 10 years. From 2021, her character became a recurring one.

In 2023, she landed the lead role of “MaNzimande” on the telenovela adaptation of the massively popular mini-series “Umkhokha”. She played the role up until the show's conclusion in February 2025.
