= Shalate Sekhabi =

South African actress and model

- Born: Kgabang Sekhabi; 27 July 2000 (age 25); Mafikeng, North West, South Africa
- Education: Crawford College, Pretoria; University of the Witwatersrand
- Occupations: Actress; model; singer
- Years active: 2014–present
- Known for: House of Zwide
- Height: 150 cm (4 ft 11 in)
- Spouse: Wanda Zuma (m. 2026)
- Father: Aubrey Sekhabi

Kgabang Sekhabi-Zuma (born 27 July 2000) is a South African actress and singer. She is best known for the roles in the television soap opera as, The River, and House of Zwide.

== Early life ==
Sekhabi was born in 2000 in Mafikeng in the North West Province of South Africa. Her father Aubrey Sekhabi is a playwright and director. In 2018, she matriculated from Crawford College, Pretoria. Then in 2019, she entered to the University of the Witwatersrand, and later graduated with a Bachelor's degree in film and television.

== Career ==
At the age of 8 years, she joined the school choir and drama club. Then, Sekhabi joined Steele Models when she was eleven years old. At the age of 14, she made her film debut with two short films: A Cup of Sugar directed by Xolile Tshabalala and Making a Killing directed by Justine Head. In January 2020, she made her television debut with the 1Magic soap opera The River, where she made the recurring role of Millicent in the season three of the soapie. After the success of the soapie, she was invited to play the lead role "Shoki" in the e.tv soap opera House of Zwide in the same year. Later in January 2021, the series replaced the long-running soap opera Rhythm City.

== Personal life ==
In May 2026, the actor and singer married fellow actor Wanda Zuma in traditional wedding surrounded by family and close friends after being engaged for nearly 7 months.

== Filmography ==
Year	Film	Role	Genre	Ref.
2020	The River	Millicent	TV series	
2020	Rhythm City	Zenani	TV series	
2021: 2025	House of Zwide	Shoki	TV series	
2023	Klevish	Nelisa	TV film	
2025	Go!	Nthabi	TV series	
