= EHostela =

South African television series

eHostela
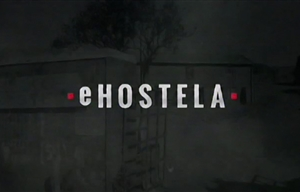
- Genre: Crime drama
- Created by: Mthunzi Dubazana
- Written by: Bongi Ndaba; Thuli Zuma; Linda Bere; Nonzi Bogatsu; Pusetso Thibedi
- Directed by: Mthunzi Dubazana; Mqondisi "MQ" Ngubane; Fikile Mogodi; Thuli Zuma
- Creative director: Mqondisi "MQ" Ngubane
- Starring: Tony Kgoroge Siyabonga Thwala Gcina Nkosi
- Composers: Musa Mhlongo; Mfiliseni Ngubane
- Country of origin: South Africa
- Original language: Zulu
- No. of seasons: 3
- No. of episodes: 39

Production
- Executive producers: Gugulethu Zuma-Ncube; Mmamitse Thibedi; Pepsi Pokane
- Producer: Khobi Ledwaba
- Cinematography: Rangwetsane "Bushy" Maphika
- Editor: Lawrence Nkgapele
- Running time: 1:00:00 (incl. commercials)
- Production company: Stained Glass Productions

Original release
- Network: Mzansi Magic; Showmax
- Release: 6 January 2019 – present

eHostela is a South African television drama series produced by Stained Glass Productions and broadcast on Mzansi Magic. The series was renewed for a third season, but lead actor Thobani Nzuza did not return. Instead, Siyabonga Thwala, Tony Kgoroge and Gcina Nkosi were added as new lead actors for the season. The show did not receive positive ratings for its third season.

== Cast ==
=== Starring ===
- Thobani Nzuza as Mndeni
- Wiseman Mncube as Jama
- Lungelo Mpangase as Khethiwe
- Lindiwe Ndlovu as MaKhumalo
- Mabutho Sithole as Scelo Sikhosana
- Sthandwa Nzuza as Friendship
- Bheki Sibiya as Mancinza
- Noxolo Mathula as Fikile AKA Fiks
- Martin Ziqubu as Detective Nkomo
- Zola Nombona as Constable Brightness
- Ernest Msibi as Vovo
- Bhekani Shabalala as Deacon Nkosi
- Mkhwanazi as Vuma
- Tiyani Baloyi as child 1
- Busa Xulu as Mtshali Child 1
- Smanga Mngeni as Mtshali Child 2
- Lucky Simayile as Vela
- Mlungisi Ndebele as Jackson
- Smanga Cibane as Uniformed Cop
- Nokuthula Mazibuko as Mam Mabaso
- Simphiwe Mkhize as Dumisani
- Lungile 'Coach' Nkombeo as MC
- Bheka Radebe as Njapha
- Bongani Mbatha as Bheki
- Bonginkosi Shangase as Brotherhood Council Member 1
- Nkosinathi Madlala as Brotherhood Council Member 2
- Sduduzo Mapumulo as Nhlakanipho
- Bruce Msani as Khandalimtshelokwakhe
- Andiswa Ndlovu as Friendship's Child 1
- Siyethaba Mhlongo as Friendship's Child 2
- Sjava as Friendship's Child 3
- Wanda Gumede as Sibongiseni

== Episodes ==
No.	Title	Directed by	Written by	Original release date
1	"01 of 13"	Mthunzi Dubazana	Thuli Zuma	January 6, 2019
Two young maskandi artists meet at a prestigious music competition and they both fall deeply in love with each other. However, there is a dark cloud following them. Mndeni wants to leave the assassin club, he is then tasked to one last job. Unbeknownst to Mndeni, he is tasked to kill his lover's father.
2	"02 of 13"	Mthunzi Dubazana	Bongi Ndaba	January 13, 2019
The death toll at the hostel rises. Mndeni is given a challenge by Khethiwe to find her father's killers. He makes a promise he know that he can't keep.
3	"03 of 13"	Fikile Mogodi	Linda Bere	January 20, 2019
Fortunate doesn't want anything to do with the people from the hostel, and the Nxumalo's. Mndeni and Khethiwe get engaged. In a fit of rage, Jama stabs his father, MaNcinza.
4	"04 of 13"	Mqondisi Ngubane	Pusetso Thibedi	January 27, 2019
The funeral of MaNcinza gets underway. But the question remains: who killed this powerful man? Meanwhile, Vovo and the Delakufa council have no choice, but to put Jama on the throne.
5	"05 of 13"	Mthunzi Dubazana	Nonzi Bogatsu	February 2, 2019
Mndeni is roped in to discuss succession plans. When Jama finds out, he is paranoid, thinking his brother wants to get him out of the throne.
6	"06 of 13"	Mqondisi Ngubane	Bongi Ndaba	February 9, 2019
Mndeni survives a near death experience and he knows its all his brother's doings. Khethiwe is devastated as her world comes crushing down.
7	"07 of 13"	Mthunzi Dubazana	Thuli Zuma	February 9, 2019
Mndeni is released from jail due to lack of evidence. The brotherhood celebrates, while the Sikhosanas are angry.
8	"08 of 13"	Fikile Mogodi	Thuli Zuma	February 28, 2019
Mndeni is put to trial. He is shocked when Mam'Khize changes her testimony and gives out evidence to that points at Mndeni to be the one that murdered MaNcinza.
9	"09 of 13"	Mqondisi MQ Ngubane	Bongi Ndaba	March 3, 2019
While grieving Khethiwe discovers a gift set aside for her by the deceased. In the brotherhood tensions between the council and Jama rise.
10	"10 of 13"	Fikile Mogodi	Pusetso Thibedi	March 10, 2019
Jama has a mole which keeps him one step ahead of the disbanded council as they try to dethrone him. Khethiwe gets an unlikely visitor who changes everything.
11	"11 of 13"	Mthunzi Dubazana	Linda Bere	March 17, 2019
Mndeni makes a shocking discovery about his family's past which shakes both his and Khethiwe's word.
12	"12 of 13"	Fikile Mogodi	Nonzi Bogatsu	March 24, 2019
The community is up in arms and Mndeni and Khethiwe's bliss is interrupted when Mndeni has to save Juba from the trouble he has got himself into. Khethiwe gets shot by Jama.
13	"13 of 13"	Mthunzi Dubazana	Thuli Zuma	March 31, 2019
Having lost everything Mndeni is on the path for revenge. He becomes an unlikely ally to Brightness as he calls upon all his resources to bring an end to the violence.

== Ratings ==
eHostela		Number of Episodes	Ratings	Ranking	Ref.
2019	January	4	1,169,795	2	
2019	February	4	936,097	3	
2019	March	5	1,009,528	2	
2019	Total	13	...	...	

== Accolades ==
Year	Award	Category	Recipient	Result
2019	Simon Mabhunu Sabela Film and Television Awards	Best Actor	Wiseman Mncube	Won
2019	Simon Mabhunu Sabela Film and Television Awards	Best Actor	Thobani Nzuza	Nominated
2019	Simon Mabhunu Sabela Film and Television Awards	Best Actress	Duduzile Ngcobo	Nominated
2019	Simon Mabhunu Sabela Film and Television Awards	Best Actress	Noxolo Mathula	Nominated
2019	Simon Mabhunu Sabela Film and Television Awards	Best Actress	Sthandwa Gama	Won
2019	Simon Mabhunu Sabela Film and Television Awards	Best Supporting Actor	Bheki Sibiya	Won
2019	Simon Mabhunu Sabela Film and Television Awards	Best Supporting Actor	Ernest Msibi	Nominated
2019	Simon Mabhunu Sabela Film and Television Awards	Best Supporting Actor	Joshua Mbhele	Nominated
2019	Simon Mabhunu Sabela Film and Television Awards	Best supporting actress	Lindiwe Ndlovu	Won
2019	Simon Mabhunu Sabela Film and Television Awards	Best supporting actress	Lungelo Mpangase	Nominated
2019	Simon Mabhunu Sabela Film and Television Awards	Best supporting actress	Zimiphi Biyela	Nominated
2019	Simon Mabhunu Sabela Film and Television Awards	Best Newcomer	Thobani Nzuza	Won
2019	Simon Mabhunu Sabela Film and Television Awards	Best Newcomer	Lungelo Mpangase	Nominated
2019	Simon Mabhunu Sabela Film and Television Awards	Best Newcomer	Smanga Mkhwanazi	Nominated
2019	Simon Mabhunu Sabela Film and Television Awards	Best Newcomer	Swelohle Luthuli	Nominated
2020	South African Film and Television Awards	Best Actor	Wiseman Mncube	Won
