= Simon Mabhunu Sabela Film and Television Awards =

- Awarded for: Achievement of creative excellence in Film and Television arts.
- Country: South Africa
- Presented by: Kwazulu-Natal Film Commission
- First award: 2013
- Website: www.kznfilm.co.za

The Simon Mabhunu Sabela Film and Television Awards is an annual South African awards ceremony that recognises outstanding achievements and excellence within the South African film and television industry, with a special focus on KwaZulu-Natal. Among those honoured at the awards are mainly actors, producers, directors and various film and television technicians.

== History ==
The awards were launched in 2013 in honour of the late TV and movie legend Simon Sabela. The awards are an initiative of the Department of Economic Development Tourism and Environmental Affairs and are implemented by the KwaZulu-Natal Film Commission.

== Awards ==
As of the 1st Simon Mabhunu Sabela film and television awards there are a total of 28 trophies that are awarded. The categories include best actor, best actress accolades, best supporting actor, best supporting actress, best newcomer and best director. Other categories include best screenplay, best use of KZN locations, best documentary short and best student film.

== Categories ==
=== Television Categories ===
- Best actor
- Best actress
- Best supporting actor
- Best supporting actress
- Best newcomer actor
- Best newcomer actress

=== Film Categories ===
- Best actor
- Best actress
- Best supporting actor
- Best supporting actress
- Best newcomer actor
- Best newcomer actress
- Best director
- Best screenplay – Feature film
- Best screenplay – Short
- Best micro-budget
- Best use of KZN as filming location
- Best use of KZN in a music video
- Best feature film
- Best isiZulu film
- Best Short Film
- Best documentary short
- Best documentary feature
- Best student film
- Lifetime achievement

== Eligibility and entry ==
As per the committee guidelines, only citizens and permanent residents of South Africa who originate from the province of KwaZulu-Natal are eligible for a nomination.
