= Duduzile Ngcobo =

South African actress

- Born: Duduzile Ngcobo; 1967 (age 58–59); Durban, South Africa
- Other names: Dudu
- Occupation: Director
- Years active: 2005–present
- Height: 1.7 m (5 ft 7 in)
- Children: 3

Duduzile Ngcobo (born 1967) is a South African actress.

== Personal life ==
Ngcobo was born in 1967 in Lamontville, Durban Kwa-Zulu Natal, South Africa. She studied at Sacred Heart Secondary of Oakford for her secondary education from 1982 to 1986.

She is a mother of three.

== Career ==
She started professional acting career when she was 49 years of age with Mzansi Magic serial Quantum of Terror. Before that, she mad minor roles in the television. Her first lead role in television came through the soapie Isithembiso. Then she made supportive roles in the serials; Ikhaya Season 2, Greed and Desire. In 1995, she acted in the direct-to-video film A Mothers gift directed by Jerry London. She also joined with soapie Muvhango and played the role "MaMbatha" for few years. In the meantime, she appeared in the serial Scam with the role of "MaZulu". In 2018, she acted in the television movies Umqhele and Umdalo Wempilo. She also acted in Mzansi Magic films Umdalo Wempilo and Uthando Lwethu.

Then in 2019 she played the role "Mayor" in DSTV serial EHostela and role "Babekazi" in SABC1 soapie Uzalo. In 2020, she joined with the e.tv. medical telenovela Durban Gen and played the lead role "Dr. Qwabe". Apart from that, she appeared in many commercials for the brands; Dettol, ABSA, DSTV, MTN, TASTIC and FN. In 2021, she returned to the soapie Uzalo and reprised her role. In the meantime, she served as the national coordinator for National Union of Mineworkers of HIV AIDS desk in South Africa.
