= Uzalo =

South African soap opera

- Genre: Soap opera, crime drama
- Created by: Duma Ndlovu
- Written by: Clive Madiya; Busisiwe Zwane; Pusetso Thibedi; Philbeth Diaho; Lorato Phefo-Khethisa; Lindo Buthelezi; Nthabi Tau; Kirsten Adams; Senzo Buthelezi; Liswa Ndlovu; Charlie Samson; Sabelo Ndlovu; Godfrey Silumko Nkonzo
- Directed by: Mthunzi Dubazana; Lungile Gumede; Charlie Samson; Sinesipho Makaula; Sphamandla Nomandla; Mbali Buthelezi
- Creative director: Mthunzi Dubazana
- Starring: Masoja Msiza; Thembi Nyandeni; Mnqobi Kunene; Fanele Ntuli; Linda Majola; Simphiwe Majozi; Noxolo Mathula; Thuthuka Mthembu; Nothando Ngcobo; Ntombifuthi Dlamini; Zama Magubane-Ngcobo; Asavela Mqokiyana; Thabo Mnguni; Sibongiseni Shezi; Cebo Mthembu; Bhekisizwe Mahlawa; Tshepo Zulu; Ntokozo Mthembu Sibiya
- Narrated by: Opening Sequence (narrated by Dawn Thandeka King) Closing Sequence (narrated by Siyabonga Radebe)
- Opening theme: Uzalo
- Ending theme: Uzalo
- Country of origin: South Africa
- Original language: Zulu
- No. of seasons: 11
- No. of episodes: 2,303

Production
- Executive producer: Gugulethu Zuma-Ncube
- Producer: Mpfariseni King David Mukwevho
- Cinematography: Lubabalo Mfungula
- Camera setup: Multi-cameras
- Running time: 23-25 minutes
- Production company: Stained Glass Productions

Original release
- Network: SABC 1
- Release: 9 February 2015 – present

Related
- eHostela; Skeem Saam; Durban Gen

Uzalo is a South African soap opera produced by Stained Glass Productions, which is co-owned by Kobedi "Pepsi" Pokane and Gugu Zuma-Ncube. It began airing in 2015, quickly becoming a hit due to its compelling narrative, writing, direction and the performances of the relatively-unknown cast. It initially told the story of two young men who were switched at birth, one being raised in a family with core Christian values and the other at a crime syndicate. It currently broadcasts from Monday to Friday on SABC 1. It is currently the most watched television show in South Africa.

== Plot ==
Uzalo initially told the story of two families in the township of Kwa-Mashu: the Mdletshe family, who play a significant role in the management of the Kwamashu Kingdom Church, and the Xulu family who run a car theft syndicate. The connection between the families was that their eldest sons were switched at birth during the period when Nelson Mandela was released from prison. As the show has progressed over the years, the storylines have dramatically changed with interchanging characters, contributing to many new story arcs, but simultaneously maintaining the growth of some of its main and supporting characters.

== Cast and characters ==
- Nkunzebomvu "Nkunzi" Mhlongo played by Masoja Msiza. Nkunzi is described as Crime Boss known typically for his big heists and street wise personality. His arrival shakes the community and the game itself. He has a daughter named Zekhethelo but later discovered that he is not his biological father. He then later discovered that he has a child whom was raised by another man and was a doctor. Later he discovered he has another son who was raised by another man whom is now a pastor. As the show Nkunzi's both sons died at the end of Season 8 and Season 9 respectively.
- Njinji Magwaza played by Thembi Nyandeni. She is wolf in sheep's clothing who act as a moral support for the youth and community of KwaMashu. She is Nkunzi's rival and her daughter Nomsawazi took After her as she also deals with hijacking cars and running of illegal businesses. She is mother of Nomasawazi and Vikizitha's aunt. She is the Founder of KwaMashu Football Club alongside MaMlambo. (Main role: season 8- Present)
- Nomsawazi Magwaza played by Fanele Ntuli. She is Njinji Magwaza's daughter and Sbonelo Mhlongo's ex-girlfriend. She was killed by her mother in season 8 but resurfaced 8 days after her death and turned on her mother and stayed with Sbonelo Mhlongo in the Mhlongo mansion in KwaMashu. She is pregnant with Sibonelo's child.
- Mondli Mdlalose, played by Thembinkosi Thwala. Mondli is the Head police captain and dated Zekhethelo. He is Nosipho and Lilly's ex-boyfriend. He had a baby with Nosipho but the child died. He is The Punisher who beats up criminals at night. He is Sbongiseni's father with his previous wife. He is also Hlengiseni's grandfather (his s on Sbongiseni and Hlelolwenkosi's son) (Main role. Season 1 - present)
- Gabisile Mdletshe - Mhlongo, played by Baby Maloka. She is the sister of the Pastor Melusi and Zandile's sister in law. She is the aunt of Mxolisi, Nkosinathi and Mumsy. She is a landlady of a house she owns. Mother of Sbonelo. She is Qhabanga Khumalo's ex-wife. She was killed by Qhabanga. She was saved by a girl called Hlelo. She is also Nkunzi's ex-wife. She left Kwa-Mashu after Sibonelo died. (Main role. Season 3 - season 9)
- Nonkanyiso "Nonka" Xaba, played by Thuthuka Mthembu. She works in the salon and is a good friend of Hleziphi and Fikile and is the ex-wife to Sibonelo. She is Njeza and Mbuso's sister and Lilly's cousin. She is MaDongwe's niece.She opened her own business. (Recurring role. Season 5; Main role. Season 6 - present)
- Sbusiso (Sbu) played by Simphiwe Majozi is an ex con. He is Fikile's Ex-boyfriend. He worked for Nkunzi and MaNgcobo, and later Sibonelo.He finds a job at a Supermarket and also joins Shamanism.Later he resigns to work in the temple.He dated Hlelo but broke up with her after he found out that Hlelo was sleeping with Teenagers.He also found out that the Shamanism was a scam and then he started work in Nonka's business. Currently he is an upright pastor of KwaMashu Kingdom Church (KKC)(Recurring role. Season 1; Main role. Season 2 - Present)
- Njeza, played by Nkanyiso Makhanya. He is an ex con and is the older brother of Nonka and Mbuso. He is Lilly's cousin and MaDongwe's nephew. He worked at Khathaza's funeral home. He had a brief relationship with Zekhethelo and was in love with Nosipho, then Nonka's friend Hleziphi.He owns a car fixing business named Loxion Bling ( Main role. Season 6 - present)
- Khethukuthula Mbatha, played by William Mnguni. He was a part of the board at KwaMashu Kingdom Church. He is formerly the pastor of KwaMashu Kingdom Church and was engaged to Fihliwe. He is also MaMadongwe's ex-husband.He is known as Shaman and he cons people. Until recently when he is elected as a Councillor (Main role. Season 1 - season 10)
- Khalabemgeza Nyawo, played by Cebo Mthembu.He is a corrupt detective who works at KwaMashu Police Station.He is known for accepting bribes of criminals, cracking jokes and speaking bombastic words.(Recurring role. Season 5–6)(Main role. Season 7-present)
- Geja, played by Mnqobi Kunene, is the leader of Amabutho eNdlende and a beacon of loyalty and ambition. With an unwavering dedication to uplifting his community and family, Geja emerges as a champion of eNdlende, setting the stage for a riveting clash of ideologies . (Main role. Season 10)
- Hawu, played by Bandile Maphalala, is a formidable stick fighting champion, known for his strength and courage. Always armed and ready for any challenge .(Main role.Season 10)
- Sgidi, played by Vusi Mdiniso, is the eldest of Izinsizwa, driven by a quest to restore his family's lost livestock and achieve autonomy. His unwavering focus on money and cattle leads him to quickly embrace the allure of material wealth upon his arrival in KwaMashu. (Main role. Season 10)
- Phefeni, played by Lungani Mabaso, is a quintessential problem child constantly craving attention and notorious for stirring up trouble. The move to KwaMashu triggers a transformative journey of discovery. (Main role. Season 10)
- Nokuthula, played by Faith Mgobhozi, is a virtuous leader of the maidens in eNdlende who strives to instill values of self-respect and love in her community. Turns out she is the apple of not one but two hopeful eyes. (Season 10)
- Linda Sibiya, playing himself, an undisputed legend of radio, joins K-Mash FM amidst turbulent times, determined to revive the station and reclaim its former glory. As a seasoned broadcaster, he takes the helm of the breakfast show, captivating listeners with his topics and charismatic presence. (Season 10)
- Evangelist Sakhile Sibiya, played by Ntando Mncube, is a man dedicated to his calling and is led by an unwavering commitment to ministering to people in need of Sakhile's arrival in KwaMashu coincides with a critical moment, as he becomes the beacon of hope casting out evil and inequities. He wholly embodies the savior the community has been awaiting. (Season 10)

== Cast As Per Title Sequence ==
- BHEKI MAHLAWE
- FANELE NTULI
- THEMBI NYANDENI
- SIMPHIWE MAJOZI
- DUDUZILE NGCOBO
- THEMBINKOSI MTHEMBU
- THABO MNGUNI
- NTOMBIFUTHI DLAMINI
- ZAMA MAGUBANE-NGCOBO
- NOXOLO MATHULA
- THUTHUKA MTHEMBU
- NKANYISO MAKHANYA
- TSHEPO ZULU
- LINDA MAJOLA
- MNQOBI KUNENE
- MASOJA MSIZA

== Main Cast ==
Actor	Character	Seasons										
Actor	Character	1	2	3	4	5	6	7	8	9	10	11
Masoja "Solle" Msiza	Nkunzebomvu Mhlongo			Main	Main	Main	Main	Main	Main	Main	Main	Main
Thembi Nyandeni	Njinji Magwaza								Main	Main	Main	Main
Fanele Ntuli	Nomaswazi Magwaza								Main	Main	Main	Main
Tshepo Zulu	Nkazimulo Mhlongo								Recurring	Recurring	Recurring	Main
Duduzile Ngcobo	Norah "Babekazi" Zikhali							Recurring	Recurring	Recurring	Recurring	Main
Mnqobi Kunene	Geja										Main	Recurring
Asavela Mqokiyana	Sizakele											Recurring
Noxolo Mathula	Lillian Lilly Dongwe					Recurring	Main	Main	Main	Main	Main	Main
Thuthuka Mthembu	Nonkanyiso Xaba					Recurring	Main	Main	Main	Main	Main	Main
Simphiwe Majozi	Sbusiso Makathini					Recurring	Recurring	Main	Main	Main	Main	Main
Nkanyiso Makhanya	Nkululeko Njeza Xaba						Main	Main	Main	Main	Main	Recurring
Zama Magubane-Ngcobo	MaDongwe					Recurring	Main	Main	Main	Main	Main	Main
Ntombifuthi Dlamini	Mam Madlala				Recurring	Recurring	Main	Main	Main	Main	Main	Main
Thabo Mnguni	Khethukuthula Pope Mbatha				Recurring	Recurring	Main	Main	Main	Main	Main	Main
Cebo Mthembu	Detective Nyawo					Recurring	Recurring	Main	Main	Main	Main	Recurring
Linda Majola	Mzamo									Recurring	Recurring	Main

== Ratings ==
Series	Episodes	Originally released		Ave. RSA viewers (millions)
Series	Episodes	First released	Last released	Ave. RSA viewers (millions)
1	1	9 February 2015	13 March 2015	5.4
2	1 (+1)	24 September 2018 (Historic Episode); 24 September 2018	25 September 2018	10.25

=== Series 1 (2015) ===
Series 1
No. overall	Episode	Directed by	Written by	Original release date	RSA viewers (millions) 10
1	Premier Episode	Alex Yazbek	Story by : Phathutshedzo Aldrean Makwarela; Teleplay by : Precious Sithole	9 February 2015	5.4
The story kicked off with a teaser set on 9 February 1990 where two boys were switched at birth, and so was their legacy and destiny. The story picked up 20 years later after the two boys were switched at birth, and the storyline for the entire season followed the family whose wealth was built in the murky criminal underworld, as well as the more wholesome Mdletshe family whose day to day life, is pretty much centred around the KwaMashu Kingdom Church.

=== Series 4 (2018) ===
No. overall	Episode	Directed by	Written by	Original release date	SA viewers (millions)
Two Part Wedding Special
167	Wedding Special	Luthando Mgomezulu & Mqondisi 'MQ' Ngubane	Story by : Bongi Ndaba; Teleplay by : Clive Madiya	24 September 2018	Undefined
MaMlambo has a nightmare. Nkunzi says his vows to MaMlambo. MaNgcobo stops the wedding.
Historic Episode
168	Wedding Special Part 2	Luthando Mgomezulu & Mqondisi 'MQ' Ngubane	Bongi Ndaba	25 September 2018	10.25
This record-breaking wedding episode was aired on 25 September 2018, and it was preceded by a gripping cliff-hanger on 24 September 2018. In the episode that aired on 25 September 2018, the saying: "Heaven has no rage like love to hatred turned, nor hell a fury like a woman scorned" was proven to be true. The gun-wielding 'woman scorned' character MaNgcobo, played by Dawn Thandeka King, stormed the wedding of her common-law husband, Nkunzi (Masoja Msiza) and her love rival MaMlambo (Gugu Gumede) with a gun, coercing him to make a choice on who he will marry between her and her former best friend-turned love rival, MaMlambo. Nkunzi made a decision to marry both women, MaNgcobo and MaMlambo, thus entering into a polygamous marriage. This episode was the first in the South African television history to surpass the 10 million ratings mark.

== Accolades ==
Year	Award	Category	Recipient	Result
2015	Simon "Mabunu" Sabela Awards	Best Newcomer	Khumbulani 'Kay' Sibiya	Won
2015	Simon "Mabunu" Sabela Awards	Best Actor	Mpumelelo Bhulose	Won
2015	Simon "Mabunu" Sabela Awards	Best Actress	Sihle Ndaba	Won
2015	Simon "Mabunu" Sabela Awards	Lifetime Achievement Award	Don Mlangeni Nawa	Won
2015	Simon "Mabunu" Sabela Awards	Best Soapie	Uzalo	Nominated
2016	The Sunday Times (South Africa) Generation Next Awards	Coolest Soapie	Uzalo	Won
2016	Simon "Mabunu" Sabela Awards	Best Actress	Sihle Ndaba	Won
2017	Dstv Mzansi Magic Viewers Choice Awards	Best Actor	Ntokozo 'TKDee' Dlamini	Nominated
2017	Dstv Mzansi Magic Viewers Choice Awards	Best Actress	Dawn Thandeka King	Nominated
2017	South African Film and Television Awards	Best Achievement in Scriptwriting	Uzalo Writing Team; Head Writer Phathutshedzo Makwarela	Nominated
2018	Simon "Mabunu" Sabela Awards	Best Supporting TV Actress	Nokuthula Mabika	Won
2018	Simon "Mabunu" Sabela Awards	Best Actress	Baby Cele	Won
2018	Simon "Mabunu" Sabela Awards	Best Supporting Actor	Simphiwe Majozi	Won
2018	The Sunday Times (South Africa) Generation Next Awards 2018	Coolest TV soapie	Uzalo	Won
2018	South African Film and Television Awards	Most Popular Soapie	Uzalo	Won
2018	Dstv Mzansi Magic Viewer Choice Awards	Best Actor	Masoja Msiza	Nominated
2019	South African Film and Television Awards	Best TV Soap	Uzalo	Won
2019	South African Film and Television Awards	Best Actress	Dawn Thandeka King	Nominated
2019	South African Film and Television Awards	Best Supporting Actor	Khaya Dladla	Nominated
2019	South African Film and Television Awards	Best Achievement in Editing - TV Soap	Nhlanhla Mngandi	Nominated
2019	South African Film and Television Awards	Best Achievement in Sound - TV Soap	Timotheus Du Preez	Nominated
2019	South African Film and Television Awards	Best Achievement in Wardrobe - TV Soap	Nokubonga Ngobeni	Won
2019	South African Film and Television Awards	Best Achievement in Make-up and Hair - TV Soap	Stella Johnson	Won
2019	South African Film and Television Awards	Most Popular TV Soap/Telenovela	Uzalo	Nominated
2020	South African Film and Television Awards	Best Actress in a TV Soap	Baby Cele Maloka	Nominated
2020	South African Film and Television Awards	Popular Soapie/Telenovela	Uzalo	Nominated
2020	Dstv Mzansi Viewers Choice Awards	Favourite Actress	Dawn Thandeka King	Nominated
2020	Dstv Mzansi Viewers Choice Awards	Favourite Actor	Masoja Msiza	Nominated
2020	Dstv Mzansi Viewers Choice Awards	Favourite Rising Star	Wiseman Mncube	Nominated
2020	The Sunday Times (South Africa) Generation Next Awards 2020	Coolest Soapie	Uzalo	Won
2020	Royalty Soapie Awards	Most Popular Soapie	Uzalo	Nominated
2020	Royalty Soapie Awards	Best Actress	Dawn Thandeka King	Won
2020	Royalty Soapie Awards	Best Supporting Actor	Simphiwe Majozi	Nominated
