= The River season 2 =

South African television series, 2019–2020

When It Rains It Pours
- Season 2
- Showrunners: Gwedion Beyon; Phuthaditshedzo Makwero
- Starring: Sindi Dlathu; Hlomla Dandala; Larona Moagi; Tinah Mnumzana; Presley Chweneyagae; Moshidi Motshekgwa; Lunga Shabalala; Lawrence Maleka; Lunga Mofokeng; Zenokuhle Maseko; Masthepo Sekgopu; Linda Mtoba; Galaletsang Koffmam; Tango Nceketzo; Thapelo Sebogodu; Anele Zondo; Tsholofelo Matshaba
- No. of episodes: 260

Release
- Original network: 1Magic
- Original release: 28 January 2019 – 24 January 2020

Season chronology
- ← Previous; Season 1 Next → Season 3

The second season of 1Magic telenovela The River premiered on 28 January 2019 and concluded on 24 January 2020. The season was led by Presley Chweniyagae Moshidi Motshekgwa, Hlomla Dandala, Lawrence Maleka, Lunga Shabalala, Larona Moagi, Tinah Mnumzana and Sindi Dlathu as Lindiwe Dlamini-Dikana.

The second season was the last season that featured Moshidi Motshekgwa as Malefu before her character died of brain cancer, and Zenokuhle Maseko as Mbali Dikana before her character died in tragic accident in the season's last episode.

== Plot ==
The season premieres with the truth exposed after Lindiwe learns the bitter truth of Tumi's identify. She then attempts suicide but is saved by the best doctors in the hospital. Realising that she is in trouble with the law, she fakes a memory loss and disability to gain time to come up with another lie and scheme. She then accuses Tumi of attempted murder and lies about being raped back when she was a child to gain sympathy from her husband. During court proceedings, Dikana accuses Tumi of conspiracy and working with her enemy to sabotage her and her company. She later stages a White monopoly capitalism hate incident to convince the court that she is not at fault. She wins the trial but loses her husband after he discovers the truth and she is exiled to a life of poverty. Dlamini is now seen living in Refilwe in a low poor shack before losing it after Tumi burns it while trying to kill her. She is then welcomed by Mam Flora who shelters them and feeds them while in need. The arrival of Gail Mathabatha shakes Lindiwe to the core after learning that Gail is the new CEO of her mine and the new love interest of her husband. She later plots to Kill Gail by faking a military hate crime associated with Gail blaming her for Resources and Mineral theft from an Angolan Army. She later shoot and kills Gail in complicated situation before Zweli was shot but survived the incident after waking up paralyzed. Few months later after gaining her family and mine back, Dikana is then invited to the wedding of Tumi Mokoena and Lindani Dlomo. Thuso and his friends then robbed Lindiwe 's mine and stole a diamond worth Millions. Realising that they were about to get caught Thuso 's friends then framed Lindani. A vicious Lindiwe then attempt to kill Lindani but failed. Tumi then learns the truth behind her husband's attempted murder; she confronted Lindiwe who rubbed into her face with no regrets. A furious Tumi then attempt to kill Lindiwe by tampering with the brakes of Lindiwe's most precious car. A sudden heart broken Mbali also discovers her mother's evil acts and confronts her. The confrontation end with Mbali being slapped by Lindiwe before leaving the house crying and taking one of her mother's cars but unfortunately destiny of death was swapped and Mbali was killed in a tragic car accident caused by Tumi which was intended for Lindiwe.

== Cast ==
- Sindi Dlathu as Lindiwe Dikana
- Larona Moagi as Itumeleng Tumi Mokoena
- Moshidi Motshekgwa as Malefu Mokoena
- Hlomla Dandala as Zweli Dikana
- Presley Chweneyagae as Thuso Mokoena
- Lawrence Maleka as Zolani Dlamini
- Lunga Shabalala as Lindani Dlomo
- Tinah Mnumzana as Flora Moloi
- Sanna Mchunu as Matilda Shabangu
- Lunga Mofokeng as Andile Dikana
- Zenokuhle Maseko as Mbali Dikana
- Linda Mtoba as Nomonde Dikana
- Masthepo Sekgopu as Dimpho Mokoena
- Ferry Jele as Veronica Thwala
- Tango Nceketzo as Paulina Dlomo
- Galaletsang Koffman as Beauty Diphoko
- Thapelo Sebogodu as Kabzela Manamela
- Anele Zondo as Faith Sibiya
- Siyabonga Raymond as Njabulo Sibiya
- Chucks WaGase Segobela as Tshabalala
- TK Dlamini as Adv. Sihle Ngema
- Shannon Ersa as Adv Sandra Stein
- Masasa Mbangeni as Adv Akhona Mbele

== Awards and nominations ==
Year	Award	Category	Nominee	Result	Ref.
2020	South African Film and Television Awards	Best Achievement in Directing - Telenovela	Ferry Jele, Catharine Cooke, Zolani Phakade & Johnny Barbuzano	Won	
2020	South African Film and Television Awards	Best Achievement in Scriptwriting - Telenovela	Gwydion Beynon, Phathutshedzo Makwarela, Christa Biyela, Lebogang Mogashoa & Mamello Lebona	Won	
2020	South African Film and Television Awards	Best Achievement in Editing - Telenovela	Bongi Malefo, Matodzi Nemungadi & Ula Oelsen	Won	
2020	South African Film and Television Awards	Best Achievement in Sound - TV Soap/Telenovela	Ben Oelsen, Juli Vanden Berg & Tladi Steven Mabuya	Won	
2020	South African Film and Television Awards	Best Achievement in Cinematography - Telenovela	Trevor Brown	Won	
2020	South African Film and Television Awards	Best Achievement in Wardrobe - TV Soap/Telenovela	Alice Mataboge	Won	
2020	South African Film and Television Awards	Best Achievement in Make-Up and Hairstyling- TV Soap/Telenovela	Bongi Mlotshwa	Won	
2020	South African Film and Television Awards	Best Actress - Telenovela	Sindi Dlathu	Won	
2020	South African Film and Television Awards	Best Supporting Actress - Telenovela	Mary-Anne Barlow	Won	
2020	South African Film and Television Awards	Best Telenovela	The River	Won	
