= The River season 3 =

TV season(2020-2021)

Like Mother Like Daughter Like Monster
- Season 3
- Showrunners: Gwedion Beyon; Phuthaditshedzo Makwero
- Starring: Sindi Dlathu; Larona Moagi; Presley Chweneyagae; Hlomla Dandala; Lawrence Maleka; Lunga Shabalala; Tinah Mnumzana; Tsholofelo Matshaba; Lunga Mofokeng; Linda Mtoba; Thembinkosi Mthembu; Tango Nceketzo; Masthepo Sekgopu; Galaletsang Koffmam; Thapelo Sebogodu
- No. of episodes: 260

Release
- Original network: 1Magic
- Original release: 27 January 2021

Season chronology
- ← Previous; Season 2 Next → Season 4

The third season of 1Magic telenovela The River premiered on 27 January 2020 and concluded on 05 February 2021. The series was led by Presley Chweneyagae, Hlomla Dandala, Tinah Mnumzana, Lawrence Maleka, Lunga Shabalala, Larona Moagi and Sindi Dlathu as Lindiwe Dlamini-Dikana.

The third season became the last season to feature actor Lunga Shabalala as Lindani before his character was killed by Mabutho on and Larona Moagi as Tumi before her character died in helicopter accident in the series last episode for season 3.

== Plot ==
The series pick up after the tragic death of Mbali Dikana. A heartbroken Lindiwe mourn while the rest of the Dikana family mourns alongside her. A guilty Tumi console Lindiwe and grooms her out of mourning. Feeling the sense of a presence daughter Lindiwe overcome grief and start considering Tumi as one of her own. The Mokoena family continues to struggle and before time could tell Thuso has already returned to his mischievous behaviour. A grounded Kedibone is task with leading her brother's family and while faces her own stitches. Lindiwe invite Tumi and Lindani to move in with them while trying to form a new relationship with Tumi. A supportive Lindani encourage Tumi and Lindiwe's new relationship. Lindani 's cousin Mabutho comes to Refilwe; with a criminal record and a shady history, nobody wants him around. A calm and loving Lindani convenience everybody to give him a chance and with the help of Kedibone, he seemly seemed changed. A notorious new Villian enters Lindiwe 's house and target Zolani as potential blesser. Zolani then falls for Emma but when Lindiwe realise that Emma is a gold digger; she tries tearing them apart but that only pushed Zolani closer to Emma. Emma then attempt to kill Lindiwe but fails and instead Andile suffered the hit. A furious Lindiwe confronts Emma in front of the whole family and Emma denied all allegations. Zolani and Lindiwe's relationship started breaking while he grew closer to Emma. A conniving Emma convince Zolani to kill Lindiwe and foolishly so Zolani hijacked Lindiwe and forcefully made her drive to a deserted reserve where Zolani learned that Emma was indeed response for Lindiwe's attempt murder which ended with Andile getting hurt. Sooner Zolani then left a gun down and allowed them to kill each other; then instantly Lindiwe shot Emma and left her down by the reserve. As the series goes by Lindani suggest that it's time that they move out of the mansion and start planning their own family. The disagreement created conflicts in their marriage and pushed Tumi to the hands of Mabutho. Tumi then starts having an affair with Mabutho and they are later caught. While questioned for cheating, Tumi blamed her husband for neglecting her and misunderstanding her. The two filed for divorce and heartbroken Lindani then overhead about Tumi's hand in the death of Mbali. While confronting Tumi about it; a heated argument between Mabutho and Lindani escalated quickly to a point where Mabutho pushed Lindani off the balcony and fell on top of a glass dinner table. Later at the hospital Lindani died and Tumi was not allowed to bury him. While adjusting to her new reality, Tumi's life was about to change for ever when a man named Mohumi invaded their home and held the whole family hostage. That night it was then revealed that Mohumi is the birth father of Tumi. Later that night Mohumi was arrested and Tumi was told to not get any closer to him. Out of the shadows of nowhere an old enemy resurfaced and claimed she is pregnant with Zolani 's child. Lindiwe then decide to do the paternity test which confirms that the child was indeed Zolani 's . Zolani then decide to marry Emma after Emma gave birth to their daughter whom they named after Lindiwe's late daughter "Mbali". Inside prison, a scamming Mohumi convince Tumi that he didn't know about his existence and that Lindiwe is the wrong one in this situation. Tumi then confessed to Mohumi about killing and Mabutho then warns her about him. Unknownling Lindiwe had planted a listening device in Tumi's room where she overhead Tumi claiming Mbali's death to Mabutho. She confronted Tumi and the two fought about it but Lindiwe failed to kill Tumi claiming she forgives her. At Zolani and Emma 's wedding, Tumi decide to reveal all she and her mother Lindiwe have done but Lindiwe then heard what she was planning. Trying to conceive Tumi to not confess, Lindiwe realised that Tumi was about to destroy everything so she shot Tumi's helicopter before it could land which resulted in Tumi dying before revealing the truth.

== Cast ==
- Sindi Dlathu as Lindiwe Dlamini-Dikana
- Larona Moagi as Itumeleng Dlomo
- Hlomla Dandala as Zweli Dikana
- Presley Chweneyagae as Thuso Mokoena
- Tsholofelo Matshaba as Kedibone Mokoena
- Lawrence Maleka as Zolani Dlamini
- Lunga Shabalala as Lindani Dlomo
- Tinah Mnumzana as Flora Moloi
- Lunga Mofokeng as Andile Dikana
- Linda Mtoba as Nomonde Dikana
- Thembinkosi Mthembu as Mabutho Dimba
- Lunathi Mampofu as Emma Dlamini
- Tango Nceketzo as Paulina Dlomo
- Matshepo Sekgopu as Dimpho Mokoena
- Koffmam as Beauty Diphoko
- Thapelo Sebogodu as Kabzela Manamela
- Seputla Sebogodi as Mohumi Ditsweni
- Thabiso Ramosetla as Morena Mokoena
- Ferry Jele as Veronica Thwala
- Meshack Mavuso as Ntsizwa Dimba
- Siyabonga Raymond as Njabulo Sibiya

== External References ==
- The River season 3 at IMDb
- The River season 3 at TVSA
