= The River season 1 =

South African television series, 2018–2019

Rich In Diamonds Thick In Blood
- Season 1
- Showrunners: Zolani Phakathi; Association Producers: Connie Ferguson; Shona Ferguson
- Starring: Sindi Dlathu; Presley Chweneyagae; Moshidi Motshekgwa; Larona Moagi; Hlomla Dandala; Lunga Shabalala; Lawrence Maleka
- No. of episodes: 260

Release
- Original network: 1Magic
- Original release: 29 January 2018 – 25 January 2019

Season chronology
- Next → Season 2

The first season of 1Magic telenovela The River premiered on 30 January 2018 and concluded on 2 February 2019 with a total of 260 episodes. The first season was led by Moshidi Motshekgwa , Presley Chweneyagae,Hlomla Dandala,Lawrence Maleka,Lunga Shabalala,Larona Moagi and Sindi Dlathu as Lindiwe Dlamini-Dikana.

The first season of the series featured Mzansi Magic 1st TV crossover between the series and the 3rd season of The Queen with Connie Ferguson appearing as Harriet Khoza; an old friend of Dlamini-Dikana.

== Plot ==
Lindiwe owns a mine, marries a police commissioner, and has two children. Mine foreman Thato Mokoena finds a $45 million diamond in the river that runs through Refilwe. Lindiwe murders Thato, places the diamond in her mine, and covers up the murder. Zweli's daughter, Nomonde, becomes Lindiwe's enemy.

Malefu Mokoena struggles to raise her children after her husband's death. Her oldest son, Thuso, is in and out of jail. Her adopted daughter, Tumi, marries Lindiwe's nephew Zolani Dlamini. Lindiwe employs Tumi at Khanyisa Diamonds. She tries to steal land in Refilwe, but Tumi foils her.

Malefu tells Tumi that she was adopted. Tumi divorces Zolani, who reveals that Lindiwe killed her father. Tumi and her new boyfriend, Lindani, return to the Dikana mansion. Tumi learns that Lindiwe is her biological mother; she is kidnapped and buried alive by Lindiwe, who knows that Zolani told Tumi about Thato's murder. Lindiwe finds Tumi's message, and attempts suicide. Lindani rescues Tumi, who files charges against Lindiwe; Lindiwe is imprisoned and acquitted.

== Cast ==
- Sindi Dlathu as Lindiwe Dikana
- Larona Moagi as Itumeleng Tumi Mokoena
- Moshidi Motshekgwa as Malefu Mokoena
- Hlomla Dandala as Zweli Dikana
- Presley Chweniyagae as Thuso Mokoena
- Lawrence Maleka as Zolani Dlamini
- Lunga Shabalala as Lindani Dlomo
- Tinah Mnumzana as Flora Moloi
- Tk Sebothoma as Happy Moloi
- Lunga Mofokeng as Andile Dikana
- Zenokuhle Maseko as Mbali Dikana
- Linda Mtoba as Nomonde Dikana
- Masthepo Sekgopu as Dimpho Mokoena
- Ferry Jele as Veronica Thwala
- Tango Nceketzo as Paulina Dlomo
- Galaletsang Koffman as Beauty Diphoko
- Thapelo Sebogodu as Kabzela Manamela
- Anele Zondo as Faith Sibiya
- Siyabonga Raymond as Njabulo Sibiya
- Chucks WaGase Segobela as Tshabalala
- Connie Ferguson as Harriet Khoza

== Awards and nominations ==
Year	Award	Category	Nominee	Result	Ref.
2019	South African Film and Television Awards	Best Telenovela	The River	Won	
2019	South African Film and Television Awards	Best Actress - Telenovela	Moshidi Motshegwa	Won	
2019	South African Film and Television Awards	Best Actress - Telenovela	Sindi Dlathu	Nominated	
2019	South African Film and Television Awards	Best Actor - Telenovela	Presley Chweneyagae	Won	
2019	South African Film and Television Awards	Best Actor - Telenovela	Hlomla Dandala	Nominated	
2019	South African Film and Television Awards	Best Supporting Actor - Telenovela	Lawrence Maleka	Won	
2019	South African Film and Television Awards	Best Supporting Actor - Telenovela	Zenzo Ngqobe	Nominated	
2019	South African Film and Television Awards	Best Supporting Actress - Telenovela	Ferry Jele	Nominated	
2019	South African Film and Television Awards	Best Achievement in Directing - Telenovela	Johnny Barbuzano, Catharine Cooke, Zolani Phakade and Ferry Jele	Won	
2019	South African Film and Television Awards	Best Achievement in Scriptwriting – Telenovela	Gwydion Beynon & Phathutshedzo Makwarela	Won	
2019	South African Film and Television Awards	Best Achievement in Original Music/Score – Telenovela	Brendan Jury	Won	
2019	South African Film and Television Awards	Best Achievement in Editing – Telenovela	Ula Oelsen, Bongi Malefo & Matodzi Nemungadi	Won	
2019	South African Film and Television Awards	Best Achievement in Sound – Telenovela	Ben Oelsen, Lele Seate & Tladi Mabuya	Won	
2019	South African Film and Television Awards	Best Achievement in Cinematography – Telenovela	Gaopie Kabe & Trevor Brown	Won	
2019	South African Film and Television Awards	Best Achievement in Wardrobe − Telenovela	The River	Won	
2019	South African Film and Television Awards	Best Achievement in Hair & Make-Up − Telenovela	The River	Won	
2019	South African Film and Television Awards	Best Achievement in Art Direction − Telenovela	The River	Nominated	
2019	47th International Emmy Awards	Best Telenovela	The River	Nominated	

== External References ==
The River season 1 at IMDb
