= 18th South African Film & Television Awards =

2024 edition of award ceremony

- Official logo for the 18th SAFTAs
- Awarded for: Excellence in Film & Television
- Awarded by: South African Film & Television Awards
- Presented by: National Film and Video Foundation (NFVF)
- Announced on: September 5, 2024
- Date: October 25, 2024–October 26, 2024
- Site: Gallagher Convention Centre, Midrand, South Africa
- Hosted by: Lerato Kganyago; Skhumba Hlophe
- Preshow hosts: Nomalanga Shozi; Kat Sinivasan; Kuhle Adams; Christopher Jaftha
- Organized by: National Film and Video Foundation
- Official website: Official SAFTAs site

Highlights
- Best Feature Film: The Fragile King
- Most awards: Shaka Ilembe (12)
- Most nominations: Shaka Ilembe (17)

Television coverage
- Network: Mzansi Magic; SABC 2

The 18th edition of the South African Film & Television Awards were held at the Gallagher Convention Centre in Midrand for two nights. The craft awards were hosted on October 25, 2024, while the main awards took place on November 26, honoring achievements in the South African film and television Industry.

== Winners & nominees ==
Best TV Presenter: Laconco; Dante Poole; Devi Sankaree Govender; Emihle Mimi Rey; Emo Adams; Govan Albert Whittles; Jolene Martin; Kuhle Adams; Mpho Modikoane; Nomalanga Shozi	Most Popular TV Soap/Telenovela: Scandal!; Generations: The Legacy; Binnelanders; Skeem Saam; Outlaws; Isitha: The Enemy; Gqeberha: The Empire; Smoke & Mirrors; Gomora; Redemption; Umkhokha: The Curse; My Brother's Keeper; Diepe Waters; House of Zwide; Giyani: Land of Blood; The River; Suidooster; The Estate; Sibongile & The Dlaminis
Best TV Sopie: Skeem Saam; Scandal!; Suidooster; Generations: The Legacy	Best Telenovela: Outlaws; Gqeberha: The Empire; The River
Best TV Drama: Shaka Ilembe; Lioness; Fatal Seduction	Best Structured Sophie Reality Show: Young, Famous & African; Life With Kelly Khumalo; BAE Beyond Borders; The Mommy Club
Best TV Comedy: Yoh! Christmas; MisEduction; Tatkiek	Best Feature Film: The Fragile King; Seconds; iNumber Number:Jozi Gold
Best Educational Program: The Khoekhoe Saga; Actived -Disability Show; Badimo	Best Lifestyle Program: Die Argitektc; Elders:Frankeyk; The Cook-A-Long
Best Current Affairs/Informative TV Show: CheckPoint With Nkepile Mabuse; The Devi Show; Daily Thetha; Expressions	Best Variety Show: Spots @10; One Night With; Sip & Talk
Best Students Film: Lights Out; Anguish; Bewilderness; Boomerang; By Two	Best Structured Or Docu-Reality Show: Reno Race; Sex And Pleasure; Habits of Gen-Z
Best Made For TV Documentary or Documentary Series: Rosemery's Hit list; Boetle Boer-Inside The Mind Of Monster; Convict Conman; Freedom Flyer-The Sailor Malan Story	Best Short Film: Fathers Day; Awake; Thrift Tot Die Food
Best Natural Historical & Environmental Programme: Legends Of Venom:Viper; City Beasts:Cape Of Chaos/Otter Chaos; Snakes In The City	Best Online Content: The Adventures of Noko Mashaba :Struggles of The Youth; Awkward Dates; Giving It Gears With Jason Goliath
Best International Format: The Masked Singer: South Africa; The Brug(The Bridge); The Perfect Picture -Season 2	Best Made For TV Movie: Ouma Olive Die Ongelooflike; Kind(Child); N Ty's Van Waterpere
Best Entertainment Programme: Koppestam; Slim Vang Sy Baas; The Saturday Showdown	Best Factual Programme: Vimba; Rebounders; Outopsie

=== Leading Performances ===
Best Actor in TV Drama: Thembinkosi Mthembu on Shaka ILembe; Nhlanhla Kunene on Adulting (TV series); Thembinkosi Mthembu on Adulting (TV series); Frank Rautenbach on Lioness (TV series)	Best Actress in TV Drama: Shannon Ersa on Lioness (TV series); Kgomotso Christopher on Fatal Seduction; Nomzamo Mbatha on Shaka ILembe
Best Actor in TV Comedy: Prev Reddy on MisEduction; Sne Dladla on Black Tax; Siyabonga Raymond Sepotokele on Yoh! Christmas	Best Actress in TV Comedy: Marion Holm on Tatkiek; Jo-Anne Rayneke on Black Tax; Phuti Komo on Entangled
Best Actor in Feature Film: Vusi Kunene on Seconds; Tomy Mnyambo on Little Nunus Big Heist; Sdumo Mtshali On iNumber Number: Jozi Gold; Pierre Van Pletzen on Huns Steek Die Rubicon Oor	Best Actress in Feature Film: Antonette Louw on The Fragile King; Kate Liquorish on Dou Your Worst; Mmabatho Mogomotsi on Seconds
Best Actor in Telenovela: Presley Chweniyagae on The River; Jody Abrahams on Arendsvlei; Lindani Nkosi on My Brothers Leeper (TV series); Themba Ndaba on Redemption	Best Actress in Telenovela: Zikhona Sodlaka on Gqeberha: The Empire; Sindi Dlathu on The River; Connie Chiume on Gomora(TV series)
Best Actor in TV sopie: Melusi Mbele on Scandal!; Germany Geldenhuys on Binnelanders; Eugene Elof on Binnelanders	Best Actress in TV sopie: Elizabeth Serunye on Skeem Saam; Je-Ani Swiegelaar on Binnelanders; Nolwazi Shange on Scandal!
