= Adulting season 3 =

Season of television series

Adulting
- Season 3
- Starring: Nhlanhla Kunene; Thembinkosi Mthembu; Luthando Mthembu; Thabiso Rammusi; Winnie Ntshaba; Lungile Duma
- No. of episodes: 13

Release
- Original network: Showmax
- Original release: 25 January – 12 April 2025

Season chronology
- ← Previous; Season 2

Adulting, a South African adult television drama series, premiered on 25 January 2025.

== Cast and characters ==
=== Main ===
- Thembinkosi Mthembu as Bonga
- Thabiso Isaac Rammusi as Mpho
- Nhlanhla Kunene as Eric
- Luthando Mthembu as Vuyani

=== Supporting ===
- Thabo Sinachi Nwozor as Thabo
- Nandi Nyembe as MaGetty
- Lungile Duma as Zithulele
- Siphesihle Khanyile as Ncumisa
- Londeka Sishi as Nkanyezi
- Isaac Gampu as Sello
- Dippy Padi as Palesa
- Samkelo Ndlovu as Minki
- Thabiso Chidere Nwozor as Thabiso
- Winnie Ntshaba as Beth
- Zenokuhle Maseko as Mpumi
- Gaisang Noge as Mapaseka
- Luyanda Zuma as Mapaseka's friend
- Busiswa Mambi as Natasha's Mother
- Deli Malinga as Zakhele's and Bonga's Mother
- Brian Khumalo as Zakhele
- Bongani Gumede as Zakhele's and Bonga's Father
- Obakeng Kgwedi as Zelda
- Thembi Seete as Portia
- Nomalanga Shozi as Botle
- Tlholo Tseole as Thabiso
- Sikelelwa Vuyeleni as Natasha
- Fezile Mkhize as Cyril Nyathi
- Noma Sonqishe as Vuyani's Mother

== Episodes ==
No. overall	No. in season	Title	Directed by	Written by	Original release date
22	1	"What A Time"	Unknown	Unknown	25 January 2025
In the season premiere, Bonga and Nkanyezi are excited to host a housewarming party in their newly-furnished home. Meanwhile, Vuyani navigates the pressures of opening his new club.
23	2	"Suburban Makoti"	Unknown	Unknown	1 February 2025
Eric and Mapaseka present a loving and supportive front, but is everything as it appears? Mpho feels lonely and embarrassed, while Bonga and Nkanyezi clash over the decision to have children.
24	3	"Selfish"	Unknown	Unknown	8 February 2025
Bonga gives Nkanyezi an ultimatum at a family meeting. Vuyani's success brings out the worst in Beth. Mpho's baby mamas don't care about his financial limitations.
25	4	"Flames And Family"	Unknown	Unknown	15 February 2025
Bonga and Nkanyezi's separation continues to cause ripples. Mpho revels in the freedom of his new car and a string of dates. Eric finds himself grappling with the aftermath of a violent attack on MaGetty.
26	5	"The Past Is Always Present"	Unknown	Unknown	22 February 2025
Bonga attempts to reconcile with Nkanyezi. Mpho spirals into a petty war with Zithulele over their divorce settlement. Meanwhile, Eric grapples with the consequences of his violent actions.
27	6	"We Are All Clowns In Different Costumes"	Unknown	Unknown	1 March 2025
Eric delves deeper into a life of crime. Bonga dedicates himself to family life. Mpho struggles with jealousy and resentment as he witnesses Steve's growing influence on his children.
28	7	"Manyonyoba"	Unknown	Unknown	8 March 2025
Vuyani, Bonga, Eric, and Mpho embark on a road trip to unwind, but simmering tensions soon escalate. Bonga's personal issues, stirred by the problems in his marriage, lead to clashes with the group.
29	8	"Live Life With No Regrets"	Unknown	Unknown	15 March 2025
As Bonga and Nkanyezi decide to end their marriage, Mpho takes a chance to start a new life with a new woman. Eric goes back to his old habits, while Vuyani chooses to control his urges.
30	9	"Fractured Ties"	Unknown	Unknown	22 March 2025
Bonga and Nkanyezi break the news of their impending divorce. Mpho distances himself from Zithulele. Vuyani faces his temptations as he wrestles with his growing attraction to Mpumi.
31	10	"Are We Victims Of Women?"	Unknown	Unknown	29 March 2025
Bonga struggles with a bitter asset dispute with Nkanyezi. Eric faces a dilemma between two women, while Mpho confronts the harsh reality of his fast-paced single life.
32	11	"We Are From The Streets"	Unknown	Unknown	5 April 2025
Bonga gets his wife back, but he can't stop cheating. Eric lets go of Minkie despite his uncertain future with Mapaseka. Vuyani falls in love with a new woman to escape his reality.
33	12	"Too Short, Too Soon"	Unknown	Unknown	12 April 2025
Vuyani finds out that Bonga slept with Lerato. Mpho struggles with being a stepfather to Naledi’s son. Vuyani snitches on Bonga to Nkanyezi. Later, Vuyani and Bonga exchange blows.
