= Adulting season 1 =

Adulting
- Season 1
- Starring: Nhlanhla Kunene; Thembinkosi Mthembu; Luthando Mthembu; Thabiso Rammusi; Winnie Ntshaba; Lungile Duma
- No. of episodes: 8

Release
- Original network: Showmax
- Original release: 20 March – 8 May 2023

Season chronology
- Next → Season 2

The first season of the Showmax Original South African adult television drama series Adulting premiered on 20 March 2023, and concluded on 8 May 2023, with a total of 8 episodes.

== Cast and characters ==
=== Main ===
- Thembinkosi Mthembu as Bonga
- Thabiso Isaac Rammusi as Mpho
- Nhlanhla Kunene as Eric
- Luthando Mthembu as Vuyani

=== Supporting ===
- Thabo Sinachi Nwozor as Thabo
- Nandi Nyembe as MaGetty
- Lungile Duma as Zithulele
- Siphesihle Khanyile as Ncumisa
- Londeka Sishi as Nkanyezi
- Isaac Gampu as Sello
- Dippy Padi as Palesa
- Samkelo Ndlovu as Minki
- Thabiso Chidere Nwozor as Thabiso
- Winnie Ntshaba as Beth
- Busiswa Mambi as Natasha's Mother
- Deli Malinga as Zakhele's and Bonga's Mother
- Brian Khumalo as Zakhele
- Bongani Gumede as Zakhele's and Bonga's Father
- Obakeng Kgwedi as Zelda
- Thembi Seete as Portia
- Nomalanga Shozi as Botle
- Tlholo Tseole as Thabiso
- Sikelelwa Vuyeleni as Natasha
- Fezile Mkhize as Cyril Nyathi
- Noma Sonqishe as Vuyani's Mother

== Episodes ==
No. overall	No. in season	Title	Directed by	Written by	Original release date
1	1	"Adulting Is Hard!"	Unknown	Unknown	20 March 2023
Bonga is awarded the business deal of his life and heads out to celebrate with his best friends Eric, Vuyani, and Mpho at KONKA. All hell breaks loose when Eric's baby mama shows up with her new flame.
2	2	"Don't Catch Feelings!"	Unknown	Unknown	27 March 2023
Mpho grapples with the trauma of being dumped by his side chick. Meanwhile, Bonga goes on a mission to pursue Nkanyezi.
3	3	"Sin City!"	Unknown	Unknown	3 April 2023
To celebrate Eric's birthday, the boys head off to Sun City. They meet four beautiful women, and things get wild. Later, Bonga and Vuyani compete for the affection of a girl while Mpho finds his next side chick.
4	4	"Beth, Cerebos And Baby Mama Drama"	Unknown	Unknown	10 April 2023
Eric is still fighting to keep Ncumisa in his life. Meanwhile, Bonga convinces Nkanyezi to go out on a date with him. Vuyani discovers a disturbing truth about Beth.
5	5	"Borrowed Time!"	Unknown	Unknown	17 April 2023
Eric and Natasha have an explosive fight. Mpho throws Zithulele a surprise party after his side chick reminds him of his wife's birthday. Vuyani meets a young Amahle and starts falling for her.
6	6	"When It Rains, It Pours"	Unknown	Unknown	24 April 2023
Nkanyezi feels that Bonga should distance himself from his friends. Eric struggles with his new normal as a single dad. Vuyani throws Amahle a lavish party.
7	7	"To The Mountain"	Unknown	Unknown	1 May 2023
Bonga and Eric have an explosive fight when Bonga confronts him about his criminal ways. Vuyani decides to be his own man and gets a job. Mpho calls a family meeting when he suspects Zithulele of cheating.
8	8	"Full Circle"	Unknown	Unknown	8 May 2023
Mpho and Zithulele try to work on their broken marriage. The boys rush to the hospital to check on Eric. Nkanyezi and Bonga have another fight about his friends as she demands that he leave them behind. Will he?
