= Zenokuhle Maseko =

South African actress and influencer (born 1998)

- Born: Zenokuhle Zenani Maseko; 8 February 1998 (age 28); Benoni, Gauteng, South Africa
- Other name: Zeno
- Education: Benoni High School
- Occupations: Actress; influencer
- Years active: 2018–present
- Notable work: The River; The Estate

Zenokuhle Zenani Maseko (born 8 February 1998) is a South African actress and influencer. She is best known playing the starring role as Mbali Dikana on the 1Magic drama series The River and the lead role as Nothando in Mzansi Magic short film Isphiwo.

== Early life ==
Maseko was born on 2 February 1998, in Benoni, Gauteng, South Africa. She attended from Benoni High School.

== Career ==
In 2018, Maseko made her first professional acting debut in a popular South African telenovela The River playing the starring role of Mbali Dikana , the daughter of Sindi Dlathu "(Lindiwe Dikana)" and Hlomla Dandala "Zweli Dikana" but exits the show at season 2. She also acted as Aya in the SABC 1 drama series Diamond City, which premiered in October 2018. In 2021, she made her debut in SABC 3 telenovela The Estate where she starred as Sindisiwe Phakathwayo.

In 2024, she played the lead in a short film Isphiwo as Nothando Sibande with Nozuko Ncayiyani She also appeared in e.tv soapie opera Scandal! as Tankiso. In 2025, she appeared in Showmax drama Adulting playing the recurring role as Mpumi.

== Filmography ==
Year	Series	Role	Notes
2018–2020	The River	Mbali Dikana	Starring role, season 1 & 2
2018	Diamond City	Aya	Supporting role
2021	The Estate	Sindisiwe Phakathwayo	Main role
2024	Isphiwo	Nothando Sbonde	Lead role
2024	Scandal!	Tankiso	Supporting role
2025	Adulting	Mpumi	Recurring role, season 3
2025	Generations: The Legacy	Dr Swazi Dambuza	Supporting role
2025	Bad Influencer	Thulz	Supporting role, season 1
2025	Isitha: The Enemy	Melody Dladla	Supporting role, season 3
