= Adulting (TV series) =

South African television drama series

- Genre: Drama
- Created by: Tshedza Pictures
- Written by: Phathutshedzo Makwarela; Gwydion Beynon
- Directed by: Thembalathu Mfebe
- Starring: Nhlanhla Kunene; Thembinkosi Mthembu; Luthando Mthembu; Thabiso Rammusi; Winnie Ntshaba; Lungile Duma; Lindani Nkosi; Thembi Seete
- Country of origin: South Africa
- No. of seasons: 3
- No. of episodes: 33

Production
- Executive producers: Phathutshedzo Makwarela; Gwydion Beynon; Candice Tennant
- Producer: Tshedza Pictures
- Camera setup: Multi-camera
- Running time: 45–50 minutes 1:00:00 (incl. commercials)

Original release
- Network: {{Plainlist: Showmax; 1Magic; }}
- Release: 20 March 2023 – present

Adulting is a South African television drama series created and produced by Tshedza Pictures, it premiered on Showmax (streaming) and 1Magic (televised) on 20 March 2023.

== Series overview ==
Series	Episodes	Originally released		
Series	Episodes	First released	Last released	Network
1	8	20 March 2023	8 May 2023	Showmax
2	13	4 December 2023	26 February 2024	Showmax
3	12	25 January 2025	12 April 2025	Showmax

== Cast and characters ==
- Thembinkosi Mthembu as Bonga - (season 1, 2, 3)
- Thabiso Isaac Rammusi as Mpho - (season 1, 2, 3)
- Nhlanhla Kunene as Eric - (season 1, 2, 3)
- Luthando Mthembu as Vuyani - (season 1, 2, 3)
- Nandi Nyembe as MaGetty - (season 1, 2, 3)
- Winnie Ntshaba as Beth - (season 1, 2, 3)
- Thabo Sinachi Nwozor as Thabo - (season 1, 2, 3)
- Lungile Duma as Zithulele - (season 1, 2, 3)
- Siphesihle Khanyile as Ncumisa - (season 1, 2, 3)
- Londeka Sishi as Nkanyezi - (season 1, 2, 3)
- Isaac Gampu as Sello - (season 1, 2, 3)
- Dippy Padi as Palesa - (season 1, 2, 3)
- Samkelo Ndlovu as Minki (season 2, 3)
- Luyanda Zuma as Mapaseka's friend (season 3)
- Thabiso Chidere Nwozor as Thabiso - (season 1, 3)
- Busiswa Mambi as Natasha's Mother - (season 1, 2)
- Deli Malinga as Bonga's Mother - (season 1, 2, 3)
- Brian Khumalo as Zakhele - (season 1, 2, 3)
- Bongani Gumede as Bonga's Father - (season 1, 2)
- Obakeng Kgwedi as Zelda - (season 2)
- Thembi Seete as Portia - (season 2)
- Nomalanga Shozi as Botle - (season 2)
- Tlholo Tseole as Thabiso - (season 2)
- Sikelelwa Vuyeleni as Natasha - (season 1)
- Fezile Mkhize as Cyril Nyathi - (season 1)
- Noma Sonqishe as Vuyani's Mother - (season 1, 2)
- Nande Ramncwana as Chillie Bae - (season 3)
