= Adulting season 2 =

Season of television series

Adulting
- Season 2
- Starring: Nhlanhla Kunene; Thembinkosi Mthembu; Luthando Mthembu; Thabiso Rammusi; Winnie Ntshaba; Lungile Duma
- No. of episodes: 13

Release
- Original network: Showmax
- Original release: 4 December 2023 – 26 February 2024

Season chronology
- ← Previous; Season 1 Next → Season 3

Adulting, a South African adult television drama series, was renewed for a second season by Showmax on 15 September 2023, and it premiered on 4 December 2023. Season 2 consists of 13 episodes which is 5 episodes more than season 1.

== Cast and characters ==
=== Main ===
- Thembinkosi Mthembu as Bonga
- Thabiso Isaac Rammusi as Mpho
- Nhlanhla Kunene as Eric
- Luthando Mthembu as Vuyani

=== Supporting ===
- Thabo Sinachi Nwozor as Thabo
- Nandi Nyembe as MaGetty
- Lungile Duma as Zithulele
- Siphesihle Khanyile as Ncumisa
- Londeka Sishi as Nkanyezi
- Isaac Gampu as Sello
- Dippy Padi as Palesa
- Samkelo Ndlovu as Minki
- Thabiso Chidere Nwozor as Thabiso
- Winnie Ntshaba as Beth
- Gaisang Noge as Mapaseka
- Busiswa Mambi as Natasha's Mother
- Deli Malinga as Zakhele's and Bonga's Mother
- Brian Khumalo as Zakhele
- Bongani Gumede as Zakhele's and Bonga's Father
- Obakeng Kgwedi as Zelda
- Winnie Ntshaba as Beth
- Thembi Seete as Portia
- Nomalanga Shozi as Botle
- Tlholo Tseole as Thabiso
- Sikelelwa Vuyeleni as Natasha
- Fezile Mkhize as Cyril Nyathi
- Noma Sonqishe as Vuyani's Mother

== Episodes ==
No. overall	No. in season	Title	Directed by	Written by	Original release date
9	1	"Out & Aroused"	Unknown	Unknown	4 December 2023
In the season premiere, Bonga is in a good place. His business is flourishing - almost as much as his sex life. Eric travels to the Eastern Cape with his friends to see Ncumisa.
10	2	"Mr Baby Daddy"	Unknown	Unknown	11 December 2023
With his marriage in a good place, Mpho rejects Palesa and the child. Eric returns to his township garage to grow his business.
11	3	"The All White Alright/ All White Affairs?"	Unknown	Unknown	18 December 2023
Bonga offers Mpho a side hustle. After the loneliness of prison, Eric is pleased to have a vat 'n sit. Later, Bonga's father reveals a shocking secret at his birthday bash.
12	4	"Man Handling"	Unknown	Unknown	25 December 2023
Bonga's father seems to have a plan on how to treat his condition. Eric and Minki have the makings of a toxic relationship. Meanwhile, Mpho's business is doing very well.
13	5	"Doctor's Order"	Unknown	Unknown	1 January 2024
Bonga has a change of heart after a big confrontation with his father. Vuyani is pulling all the stops for Zelda. Minki disappears again after a fight with Eric.
14	6	"Ziyakhala"	Unknown	Unknown	8 January 2024
Bonga reaches out to Nkanyezi. The back and forth between the two families begins to take its toll on Mpho. Honesty finally drives father and son towards catharsis.
15	7	"Radical Honesty"	Unknown	Unknown	15 January 2024
Bonga's mother and brother come to Johannesburg to be with Bonga's father. Eric puts Ncumisa in a new school, and it seems he's finally got his life together.
16	8	"Dear Father"	Unknown	Unknown	22 January 2024
Eric struggles to get through to his rebellious teenage daughter, while the chickens come to roost for Mpho.
17	9	"School Of Adulting"	Unknown	Unknown	29 January 2024
Bonga is reeling after seeing Nkanyezi with another man. Zithulele takes over Mpho's fatherly duties. Vuyani feels pressured to take things to the next level with Zelda.
18	10	"The Devil You Know"	Unknown	Unknown	5 February 2024
Vuyani plans on starting afresh with a familiar face from a not-so-distant past. Bonga channels Nkanyezi's rejection into disdain for the female species and begins to exploit gold-digging women.
19	11	"Mosquito Bite"	Unknown	Unknown	12 February 2024
Eric comes home and finds Ncumisa gone. Eric's mission doesn't go as planned. Zithu has had enough and shocks Mpho with her request.
20	12	"Soccer Guy"	Unknown	Unknown	19 February 2024
Bonga wants nothing to do with the guys. Mpho reaches out to Zithu. Will she give him another chance? Mapaseka helps Ncumisa and Eric to reconcile their differences.
21	13	"Adulting Begins"	Unknown	Unknown	26 February 2024
Eric and Ncumisa are finally in a good space. Bonga has cold feet on the morning of the wedding. Mpho vows to be a better man, and Vuyani stands up for Beth.
