= Lindiwe Dikana =

- The River character
- Portrayed by: Sindi Dlathu
- Duration: 6 years
- First appearance: 2018 (as of season 1)
- Last appearance: 2024(as of Season 6 finale)
- Appears on: 6 seasons of The River; Season 4 & season 6 of The Queen; Season 2 of The Republic
- Created by: Phuthi Makwera; Gedion Beyon
- Spin-off appearances: Wura
- Crossover appearances: The Republic; The Queen
In-universe information
- Occupation: Businesswomen; Investor
- Owner: Khanyisa Diamonds
- Family: Dikana Family
- Mother: Thandeka Dlamini played by Thembi Jones
- Siblings: Nolwazi Dlamini played by Slindile Nodangala
- Sisters: Veronica Dlamini played by Ferry Jele
- Spouse: Zweli Dikana played by Hlomla Dandala (Divorced as of season 5 finale)
- Husband: Bangizwe Zwane played by Siyabonga Thwala (married as of season 6)
- Children: 6(including Zolani Dlamini played by Lawrence Maleka)
- Sons: Andile Dikana-Sibiya played by Lunga Mofokeng
- Daughters: Itumeleng "Tumi"Dlomo played by Larona Moagi (died as of season 3 finale); Mbalenhle"Mbali"Dikana played by Zenokuhle Maseko (died as of season 2 finale)
- Stepchildren: 2
- Stepsons: Ndumiso Zwane played by Lucky Kunene
- Stepdaughters: Nomonde Dikana played by Linda Mtoba
- Grandchildren: 2
- Grandsons: Enzo Dikana (Andile Dikana-Sibiya'son)
- Granddaughters: Zanothando Dlamini (Zolani Dlamini and Khwezi Hlophe's daughter) Mbalenhle Dlamini (Zolani & Emma Dlamini's daughter)[died as of season 4)
- Nieces: Zolani Dlamini played by Lawrence Maleka
- Other relatives: Harriet Khoza played by Connie Ferguson( Cousin Twice Removed)

Lindiwe Bettina Dlamini-Zwane (née Dlamini )also known as Lindiwe Dikana is a fictional character portrayed by Sindi Dlathu on 1Magic telenovela The River. The character has received widespread acclaim and Dlathu has been praised for her portrayal of the character and has received a SAFTA Award for Best Actress in a telenovela in 2020 and 2021.

== Family tree ==
Ancestors of Lindiwe Dikana

Emmarentia Dlamini (played by Lunathi Mampofu)
Zolani Dlamini (played by Lawrence Maleka)
Khwezi Hlophe (played by Tina Dlathu)
Veronica Dlamini (played by Ferry Jele)
Dumsani Dlamini (Zolani's father)
Thandeka Dlamini (played by Thembi Mtshali-Jones)
Mbali Dikana (played by Zenokuhle Maseko)
Andile Dikana-Sibiya (played by Lunga Mofokeng
Zweli Dikana (played by Hlomla Dandala)
Nomonde Dikana (played by Linda Mtoba)
Lindiwe Dlamini (played by Sindi Dlathu
Lindani Dlomo (played by Lunga Shabalala)
Tumi Mokoena-Dlomo (played by Larona Moagi)
Mohumi Distwewu (played by Seputla Sebogodu)

== Character focus ==
Season 1

Lindiwe Dlamini is introduced as wife of Zweli Dikana, and the mother of Andile and Mbali Dikana. As she was running a struggling mine, Lindiwe was informed that if no discovery is made at her mine, Khanyisa Diamond, the government will officially shut it down for good. As young girl, Lindiwe was raised in a broken family and had struggled her way to the top. Now, she realizes that she might lose it all and she fears that her children will suffer the way that she did. At her doorstep that day was a man named Thato Mokoena, who had discovered a diamond at the river that runs through Refilwe. As the good man that he was, Thato made a deal with Lindiwe that stipulated that if he showed Lindiwe where he discovered the diamond, Lindiwe is going to take the diamond and auction in and through that money Lindiwe is going to build houses for the people of Refilwe. Greedy and ambitious, Lindiwe agreed and when Thato showed them where he got the diamond, Lindiwe betrayed him by hitting him with a stone at his head and drowning him to death. Lindiwe's nephew, Zolani Dlamini, witnessed the murder and was convinced by Lindiwe that killing Thato and stealing the diamond for themselves would benefit them greatly economically. Zolani agreed to keep her secret for the sake of money and for the love he had for his aunt.

When the police started the investigation, it was discovered that a man named Happy Moloi had been to the river that day, so he had evidence of who could have killed Thato Mokoena. But the man was also greedy when he then discovered that the owner of the earrings, which was the only evidence that implicated Lindiwe guilty in Thato's death, was a woman her mother was working for, which was Lindiwe. Instead of giving the police the evidence, Happy decided to blackmail Lindiwe against those earrings, and a freaked out Lindiwe was realizing how much Happy knew and what could go wrong if he tells her husband, or, for that matter, the police. Lindiwe thought it through and hard and decided that killing Happy was the right decision. Sending her nephew Zolani, she ordered to have Happy burnt to death inside his mother's house. Zolani followed her aunt's instructions and had Mam Florah's house burnt. Fearing that her son has died, Mam could not possibly work and Lindiwe graciously rejoiced, but little did she know, Happy survived the fire. When it was to be believed that Happy is dead, he revealed himself to everyone, which left Lindiwe under another threat. So Lindiwe decided to give Happy the money that he wanted but his price demand increased, and Lindiwe was furious. Lindiwe then followed Happy to see where and who he spends most of his time with. Lindiwe then discovered that Happy was secretly dating her son Andile Dikana. Furious to the bitter end after learning that her son is gay and is sleeping with her enemy, Lindiwe attempted again to have Happy killed, this time through an explosion. Happy then sent Andile to do the pickup for him, risking Andile's life. When Andile and Happy could open the bag, hijackers hijacked them, stole the bag, and they exploded. Realizing how dangerous Lindiwe is, Happy finally told the police. However, Lindiwe had friends in the police force who informed Lindiwe about Happy's whereabouts. They told Lindiwe the address where Happy was hiding, and Lindiwe sent Zolani to kill Happy. When Happy realized that someone was in the house, he tried to run away but instantly Zolani shot him. Bleeding to death, Happy landed at the Mokoena household and told Itumeng "Tumi" Mokoena that Lindiwe Dikana killed her father, before he passed out and died.

Freaked out by Happy's last words, Tumi decided to do the investigation herself. Even though she told her mother, Malefu Mokoena, and her brother, Thuso "Cobra" Mokoena, who didn't believe her due to lack of evidence, she went ahead and started playing friendly with Lindiwe's nephew Zolani Dlamini. A tempted Zolani starting developing a crush on Tumi who was only on mission to find her father's killer. After 10 days of investigating, Tumi then discovered that Lindiwe's famous diamond was discovered in Refilwe and that Lindiwe was at the crime scene in the day of her father's death. A vicious Tumi then gave Lindiwe's husband, Zweli Dikana who is a Police commissioner all evidence that implicated Lindiwe guilty in Thato's death. Doing his job and furious to learn about his wife's scandalous behavior, Zweli then arrested Lindiwe in their home during the auction day of the diamond.
