= The River (South African TV series) =

South-African TV drama series

- Season 6 poster
- Genre: Drama
- Created by: Phathutshedzo Makwarela; Gwydion Beynon
- Developed by: Tshedza Pictures; Phathutshedzo Makwarela; Gwydion Beynon
- Written by: Various
- Directed by: Various
- Creative directors: Johnny Barbuzano; Bonga Percy Vilakazi
- Starring: Sindi Dlathu; Presley Chweneyagae; Hlomla Dandala; Larona Moagi; Lawrence Maleka; Tinah Mnumzana; Siyabonga Thwala
- Theme music composer: Brendan Jury; Sindi Dlathu
- Opening theme: Brendan Jury
- Composers: Brendan Jury; Sindi Dlathu
- Country of origin: South Africa
- Original languages: English; Setswana; IsiZulu; IsiXhosa
- No. of seasons: 6
- No. of episodes: 1,560

Production
- Executive producers: Phathutshedzo Makwarela; Gwydion Beynon; Sindi Dlathu
- Producers: Candice Tennant; Bonga Percy Vilakazi; Durani Barnardo
- Production locations: Cullinan Diamond Mine; Refilwe; Silver Lakes
- Editors: Bongi Malefo; Ula Oelsen
- Camera setup: Multi-camera
- Running time: 22–24 minutes
- Production company: Tshedza Pictures

Original release
- Network: 1Magic
- Release: 29 January 2018 – 2 February 2024

Related
- The Wife; The Queen

The River is a South African television drama series created by Phathutshedzo Makwarela and Gwydion Beynon. An M-Net production by Tshedza Pictures for DStv's general-entertainment subscription channel 1Magic, it is available for streaming on Naspers' Showmax. Reruns began airing weekdays on Mzansi Magic in October 2019 which also we conclude on 19 September 2025 for Mzansi Magic viewers, and older reruns began airing weekdays on Mzansi Wethu in July 2021.

In 2021, series lead Sindi Dlathu was announced as co-executive producer for the show's fourth season. The River was renewed for season five, which premiered on 7 February 2022, in November 2021. The series was renewed for a sixth and final season, premiering on 6 February 2023.

The drama series is set in Pretoria against the backdrop of South Africa's mining industry. A diamond discovery in the river running between the poor township of Refilwe and the affluent neighborhood of Silver Lakes quickly turns from a blessing to a curse.

The drama stars Sindi Dlathu, Presley Chweneyagae, Hlomla Dandala, Moshidi Motshegwa, Larona Moagi and Tsholofelo Matshaba in lead roles.

The Nigerian series Wura is an adaptation of this drama.

== Plot ==
Lindiwe owns a mine, is married to a police commissioner, Zweli and has two children, Andile and Mbali. Zweli has a daughter out of wedlock, Nomonde, who later becomes Lindiwe's enemy. Mine foreman Thato Mokoena finds a $45 million diamond in the river that runs through Refilwe. Lindiwe murders Thato, places the diamond in her mine, and covers up the murder.

Malefu Mokoena struggles to raise her children after her husband's death. Her oldest son, Thuso, is in and out of jail. Her adopted daughter, Tumi, marries Lindiwe's nephew Zolani Dlamini. Lindiwe employs Tumi at Khanyisa Diamonds. She tries to steal land in Refilwe, but Tumi foils her.

Malefu tells Tumi that she was adopted. Tumi divorces Zolani, who reveals that Lindiwe killed her father. Tumi and her new boyfriend, Lindani, return to the Dikana mansion. Tumi learns that Lindiwe is her biological mother; she is kidnapped and buried alive by Lindiwe, who knows that Zolani told Tumi about Thato's murder. Lindiwe finds Tumi's message, and attempts suicide. Lindani rescues Tumi, who files charges against Lindiwe; Lindiwe is imprisoned and acquitted.

Christo tells Zweli about Lindiwe. Zweli asks Lindiwe for a divorce, and orders her to leave with Zolani. Mbali abuses drugs; Nomonde becomes CEO of Khanyisa Diamonds, and Zweli becomes a company shill.

After rescuing Mbali, Zweli tells his children about Lindiwe. Cobra and Paulina contest an interim ward election. Percy and Oupa rig the election in Cobra's favor, and Cobra invites Paulina to join the council.

Lindiwe resurfaces in her childhood Refilwe shack, powerless and abandoned. Tumi sets her shack afire; Zolani rescues her, and Sis Flora takes them in.

Cobra uses his position corruptly. Nomonde struggles to keep the mine afloat, juggling her relationship with Lindani. She begins looking for a new CEO. Gail Mathabatha (Mary Ann Barlow) is hired, and soon begins a romantic relationship with Zweli. Lindiwe kills her on their wedding day.

Zweli (now in a wheelchair) asks Lindiwe to marry him again. Tumi and Lindiwe reconcile and Tumi marries her childhood sweetheart, Lindani.

Thuso, Percy, and Oupa steal Lindiwe's diamonds, and Thuso gives them to Lindani to hold. Lindani tells his friend Charlie about the diamonds; Lindiwe and Zolani torture Charlie, go to Lindani's house and find the diamonds. When Lindani enters, Lindiwe shoots him.

Tumi and Mbali overhear Lindiwe and Zolani celebrating, and Tumi tampers with the brakes of Lindiwe's car. Mbali is the one who drives her mother's car, instead of Lindiwe, and is killed in an accident.

Zolani meets a woman, Emma, who he falls in love with. She realizes that he is Lindiwe's employee; they break up, and he reconciles with Lindiwe.

Cobra's ex arrives with their son, Morena. Morena steals from the townspeople, but Cobra does not believe them. Andile's boyfriend Njabulo returns with a friend, Mondli. Mondli and Njabulo begin a relationship, and Andile breaks up with him. Andile attempts suicide, and he and Njabulo reconcile. Mabutho and Tumi begin an affair, and Andile learns about it. Tumi ends it, and leaves her and Lindani's bedroom. The Dikanas and Lindani see her, and Mabutho admits that he and Tumi are in love. Emma returns, pregnant with Zolani's baby, and Zolani proposes to her.

Mohumi, Lindiwe's ex and Thato's friend, seeks revenge. He and his rebels hold Lindiwe and her family hostage and want to kill Tumi, but Lindiwe tells Mohumi that he is Tumi's father.

Tumi visits Mohumi after his arrest, and Lindiwe tells Detective Tshabalala to bug the room. Tumi tells Mohumi that she killed Mbali. Lindiwe goes to Mohumi's prison cell and admits killing Happy, Sheree, and Gail. Mohumi records her, sends Tumi the recording and tells her to post it on social media. Tumi shows Lindiwe the recording.

Zolani and Emma marry. Tumi, in a helicopter, wants to reveal Lindiwe's crimes at the wedding. Lindiwe tries to talk her out of it; she and Tshabalala drive to the helipad and she shoots at the helicopter, which explodes with Tumi inside it.

Elvis coerces Lindiwe to marry him, and Zweli has a letter as insurance. Zolani shoots Elvis, who is wearing a bulletproof vest and asks Zweli for protection.

Cobra is arrested. Zweli investigates Tumi's death, and Cobra is released. Lindiwe kills Elvis with a poisoned condom. Zweli learns that Lindiwe killed Tumi, and meets Nyakallo (Sis Flora's niece); they marry, but Lindiwe kills Nyakallo and they reconcile. Nomonde and Mabutho starts to date. The Dikana's family is unaware of it while Nomonde is also oblivious of Mabutho's real identity. His identity come to light. And they reconcile. Andile and Njabulo get married. While Emma and Zolani's cousin begin an affair, Lindiwe warns Emma and aims her with a gun. Mohumi steals and attempts to sell Lindiwe's mine, while the community of Refilwe becomes aware of Mohumi's doings. Thuso collaborates with Lindiwe to get rid of Mohumi. In a helicopter, Lindiwe aims the gun at Mohumi to sell and transfer the mine all back to her. Lindiwe expels him from the helicopter and he drowns the sea. Mohumi dies.

Season 5 begins with Nomonde and Mabutho's wedding. The Mokoenas have moved to the new house. Mnqobi comes and wants to have an affair with Lindiwe, Zweli suspects it. When Lindiwe realises Mnqobi's intentions she attempts to kill him. There's a new family in town. The Hlophes. Bukhosi, Nomafu, Mlilo, Nkanyiso and Khwezi. And wants to dethrone and eliminate Lindiwe. Thuso marries both Paulina and Angelina in a polygamous marriage. They both become pregnant. And both go to labour. When Angelina realises that her son is dead, she swaps the babies and make it seem as if Paulina gave birth to a still born child. Paulina goes nuts and suspects that Angelina is involved in her child's death. Paulina vows revenge against Cobra and the whole family where she drowns the baby in the pool. Nomonde comes back and fake pregnancy with twin babies, with an attempt to obtain the Dikana family's money. Paulina 's presumed baby is buried. Zweli finds out that Nomonde is faking her pregnancy. Zweli discovers that Mabutho has been involved in the heists and claim that he can't marry Nomonde. Mabutho injures him unintentionally. Zweli becomes comatose. Lindiwe vows revenge against Mabutho and hunt him down. Paulina also finds out that her son is actually alive and run away with him. Both Paulina and Mabutho are on the run and being hunted down by the police. Paulina asks her other cousin to take Jr. Thato and make DNA tests with him and they come back positive claiming that Paulina is the biological mother. Paulina goes and confronts Angelina, that's whereby they fight for a gun and Paulina dies. Mabutho is caught by Lindiwe and Zolani, in defense he accidentally shoots Zolani and he dies. Lindiwe is distraught.

Zolani is buried and Zweli demands divorce from Lindiwe claiming that their family is finished. It started with Mbali, Tumi then Zolani.

Zweli leaves and Lindiwe is smitten by her childhood friend Bangizwe Zwane. Khwezi goes into labour and delivers Zolani's baby. The Hlophes attempt to kill Lindiwe by throwing her into the tank dam but she's rescued. Andile slowly learns Lindiwe's crimes that she may have been involved in Tumi's murder. Lindiwe and Bangizwe get married. Jr. Thato bleeds and Cobra has suspicions that he might be Paulina's baby. The DNA tests results improve that Jr. Thato is indeed Paulina 's biological son. Angelina is arrested. Zodwa takes Jr. Thato to KZN and raise him. Nomonde returns and learns that she is no longer welcome at Lindiwe's house. She feels entitled and is rude to everyone. Finally she and Lindiwe makes peace. Lindiwe's mother come back (Thandeka). Lindiwe's childhood trauma comes back and tries to kill her. Dimpho finds out that Lindiwe is planning to take Refilwe community 's money and release the document online. That's where she learns about all Lindiwe's dark secrets. Tshabalala kidnaps both Dimpho and Beauty, trying to burn them alive. They are saved by commissioner Zweli Dikana.

Zweli returns and arrests Lindiwe for all she has done. By killing Happy, Thato, Sheree, Gail Mathabatha, Mosa, Tumi, Nyakallo,Mohumi The Hlophes and others.

Lindiwe is arrested. Flora is distraught when she learns that Lindiwe is responsible for Mosa, Happy and Nyakallo's murder. Lindiwe is still paying for her sins as she is haunted by Thato and Tumi's ghosts. With Tumi taunting her that her fate has changed as everyone she was close with they have left her and some died. Bangizwe asks Lindiwe if she was involved in killing Tumi her own daughter but Lindiwe denies first but later agrees. Bangizwe fakes Lindiwe's death. Refilwe community and the Dikanas prepare for Lindiwe's funeral. Lindiwe comes back on her own funeral roasting everyone that this is not how her story ends. She and Cobra fight for the bomb and die. The miners finds a huge diamond at Khanyisa Diamonds mine. Kedibone, Dimpho and Flora call it "Thuso ya Refilwe". Ending The River

Series overview:

Season 1: 29 January 2018 - 25 January 2019

Season 2: 28 January 2019 - 24 January 2020

Season 3: 27 January 2020 - 5 February 2021

Season 4: 8 February 2021 - 4 February 2022

Season 5: 7 February 2022 - 3 February 2023

Season 6: 6 February 2023 - 2 February 2024

Stars:

Season 1: Sindi Dlathu; Lawrence Maleka & Moshidi Motshegwa

Season 2: Sindi Dlathu, Larona Moagi & Moshidi Motshegwa

Season 3: Sindi Dlathu, Hlomla Dandala and Larona Moagi

Season 4: Tinah Mnumzana, Thembinkosi Mthembu & Seputla Sebogodi

Season 5: Sindi Dlathu, Presley Chweneyagae & Hlomla Dandala

Season 6: Sindi Dlathu, Siyabonga Thwala, Presley Chweneyagae

== Cast ==
- Sindi Dlathu as Lindiwe Dlamini-Dikana: Thandeka's daughter. Zweli and Bangizwe Zwane 's wife; Tumi, Andile and Mbali's mother; Veronica and Nolwazi's sister; Zolani's aunt; Nomonde and Ndumiso 's stepmother; Mohumi's enemy (2018 - 2024)
- Presley Chweneyagae as Thuso "Cobra" Mokoena: Malefu and Thato's elder sonho and Itumeleng's brother, Paulina and Angelina's husband; Morena Jr. Thato and Keitumetse's father (2018 - 2024)
- Moshidi Motshekgwa as Malefu Mokoena: Thato's wife, Dimpho and Thuso's mother, Tumi's adoptive mother (2018 -2019)
- Hlomla Dandala as Zweli Dikana: Lindiwe's first ex-husband, Nomonde, Andile and Mbali's father. Zolani's uncle and Tumi's stepfather (2018 - 2024)
- Lawrence Maleka as Zolani Dlamini: Veronica's son; Tumi's first husband, Emma's husband and Khwezi's lover; Lindiwe's nephew; Jr. Mbali's father (2018-2023)
- Lunga Shabalala as Lindani Dlomo: Zodwa's son; Paulina's brother; Khabonina's ex-fiance, Tumi's husband (2018 - 2020)
- Lunathi Mampofu as Emmarentia Dlamini: Zolani's wife, Beauty 's cousin; Jr. Mbali's mother (2020 - 2022)
- Larona Moagi as Itumeleng "Tumi" Mokoena: Lindiwe and Mohumi's prodigal daughter, Malefu and Thato's adoptive daughter, Dimpho and Thuso's adoptive sister. Zolani's ex-wife and cousin. Andile and Mba sister, Nomonde 's stepsister; Lindani's wife and Mabutho's fiancee (2018 - 2021, 2023)
- Tinah Mnumzana as Flora Moloi: Happy's mother; Mosa and Nyakallo's aunt. Kedibone and Malefu's friend; Lindiwe's maid. Mohumi and Pastor Mdluli's one sided lover (2018 - 2024)
- Linda Mtoba as Nomonde Dikana: Zweli's daughter, Andile and Mbali's sister; Tumi's stepsister; Mabutho 's wife; Lindiwe's stepdaughter (2018 - 2024)
- Thembinkosi Mthembu as Mabutho Dimba: Paulina and Lindani's cousin, Tumi and Nomonde 's husband (2020 - 2023)
- Tsholofelo Matshaba as Kedibone Mokoena: Thato's sister, Thuso and Dimpho's aunt. Flora's friend (2019 - 2024)
- Zenokuhle Maseko as Mbali Dikana: Lindiwe and Zweli's daughter, Nomonde, Tumi and Andile's younger sister (2018 -2020)
- Lunga Mofokeng as Andile Dikana: Lindiwe and Zweli's son. Nomonde, Tumi and Mbali's brother. Njabulo 's husband; Enzo's father (2018 - 2024)
- Tango Ncetezo as Paulina Dlomo: Zodwa's daughter, Lindani's sister, Mabutho's cousin. Jr. Thuso's wife, Thato's mother (2018 - 2023)
- Siyabonga Thwala as Bangizwe Zwane: Lindiwe 's second husband, Ndumiso's father; Nomonde, Tumi, Andile and Mbali's stepfather (2023 - 2024)
- Bheki Mkhwane as Bukhosi Hlophe: Nomafu's husband, Mlilo, Nkanyiso and Khwezi's father (2022 - 2023)
- Matshepo Sekgopi as Dimpho Mokoena: Malefu and Thato's daughter; Thuso's sister, Tumi's adoptive sister (2018 - 2024)
- Galaletsang Koffman as Beauty Montlenyane: Emmarentia 's cousin; Tumi, Andile Paulina and Dimpho's friend (2018 - 2024)
- Nokuthula Ledwaba as Angelina Mthobeni: Cobra's second wife, Keitumetse 's mother. Jr. Thato's adoptive mother (2018 - 2023)
- Seputla Sebogodi as Mohumi Ditshweni: Tumi's father and Lindiwe's enemy (2020 - 2022)
- Siya Raymond as Njabulo Sibiya: Andile's husband; Jr. Enzo's father (2018 - 2024)
- Ferry Jele as Veronica Dlamini: Zolani's mother and Lindiwe's sister Tumi, Andile and Mbali's aunt. (2018 - 2024)
- Winnie Ntshaba as Zodwa Dlomo: Paulina and Lindani's mother, Mabutho's aunt. (2019 - 2023)
- Don Mlangeni Nawa as Thato Mokoena: Malefu 's husband. Thuso and Dimpho's father; Tumi's adoptive father. Kedibone 's sister (2018, 2021, 2023)
- Thoko Ntshinga as Nomhle Dikana: Zweli and Dambisa's mother. Nomonde, Andile and Mbali's grandmother. (2018 - 2024)
- Thembi Jones as Thandeka Dlamini: Lindiwe and Nolwazi's mother. Zolani, Tumi, Andile, abnd Mbali's grandmother. (2023)
- Slindile Nodangala as Nolwazi Dlamini: Thandeka's daughter; Lindiwe and Veronica 's sister. Tumi, Andile and Mbali's aunt. (2022)
- Brenda Ngxoli as Dambisa Dikana: Nomhle 's daughter, Zweli and Qaqamba's sister. Nomonde, Andile and Mbali's aunt. (2018 -2023)
- Thabiso Ramotshela as Morena Mokoena: Thuso's son. Keitumetse and Jr. Thato's brother. (2020 - 2024)
- Brenda Mhlongo as Nomafu Hlophe: Bukhosi's wife, Mlilo, Nkanyiso and Khwezi's mother (2022 - 2023)
- Unathi Mkhize as Nkanyiso Hlophe: Nomafu and Bukhosi Hlophe 's son. Mlilo and Khwezi's brother. Dimpho's lover (2022 - 2023)
- Vuyo Biyela as Mlilo Hlophe: Nomafu and Bukhosi's son. Nkanyiso and Khwezi's brother (2022 - 2023)
- Tina Dlathu as Khwezi Hlophe: Nomafu and Bukhosi's daughter; Mlilo and Nkanyiso 's brother; Zolani's lover (2022-2023)
- Chucks Shisana as Detective Sibusiso Tshabalala: A corrupt police officer employed to do Lindiwe's evil work (2018-2024)

Actors	Characters	Seasons					
Actors	Characters	1	2	3	4	5	6
Sindi Dlathu (Sindiswa Dlathu)	Lindiwe Dlamini-Dikana	Main	Main	Main	Main	Main	Main
Presley Chweneyagae	Thuso Mokoena	Main	Main	Main	Main	Main	Main
Siyabonga Thwala	Bangizwe Zwane						Main
Tinah Mnumzana	Flora Moloi	Main	Main	Main	Main	Main	Main
Tsholofelo Matshaba	Kedibone Mokoena		Main	Main	Main	Main	Main
Matshepo Sekgopi	Dimpho Mokoena	Main	Main	Main	Main	Main	Main
Galaletsang Koffman	Beauty	Main	Main	Main	Main	Main	Main
Dr Thembi Jones	Thandeka Dlamini						Recurring
Lucky Kunene	Ndumiso Zwane						Main
Thapelo Sebogodi	Khabzela	Main	Main	Main	Main	Main	Main
Thabiso Ramotshehla	Morena Mokoena			Recurring	Main	Main	Main
Chuck Shisane	Sbusiso Tshabalala	Recurring	Recurring	Recurring	Recurring	Main	Main
Ferry Jele	Veronica Dlamini	Recurring	Recurring	Recurring	Recurring	Recurring	Recurring
Tshepo Seogiso	Charlie	Guest	Recurring	Recurring	Recurring	Recurring	Recurring

Former cast members
Actors	character	Seasons					
Actors	character	1	2	3	4	5	6
Larona Moagi	Tumi Mokoena	Main	Main	Main			
Hlomla Dandala	Zweli Dikana	Main	Main	Main	Main	Main	Recurring
Lunga Mofekeng	Andile Dikana-Sibiya	Main	Main	Main	Main	Main	Main
Linda Mtoba	Nomonde Dikana	Main	Main	Main	Main	Recurring	Recurring
Bheki Mkhwane	Bukhosi Hlophe					Main	Main
Brenda Mhlongo	Nomafu Hlophe					Main	Main
Tina Dlathu	Khewzi Hlophe					Recurring	Main
Unathi Mkhize	Nkanyiso Hlophe					Main	Main
Vuyo Biyela	Mlilo Hlophe					Main	Main
Lunathi Mampofu	Emmarentia Dlamini			Recurring	Main	Main	
Jessica Sithole	Nyakallo Kgomo				Recurring		
Ayanda Borotho	Zanezulu						Recurring
Mary-Anne Barlow	Gail Mathabatha		Recurring				
Siya Sepotokele	Njabulo Sibiya	Recurring	Recurring	Recurring	Recurring	Recurring	Recurring
Lawrence Maleka	Zolani Dlamini	Main	Main	Main	Main	Main	
Tango Ncetezo	Paulina Dlomo	Main	Main	Main	Main	Main	
Moshidi Motshegwa	Malefu Mokoena	Main	Main				
Kagiso Rathebe	Kieth						Recurring
Lunga Shabalala	Lindani Dlomo	Main	Main	Main			
Don Mlangeni Nawa	Thato Mokoena	Recurring		Guest			
Jet Novuka	Walter Khanyisa	Recurring					
Mavuso Magabane	Ntsizwa Dimba			Recurring			
Zenokuhle Maseko	Mbali Dikana	Main	Main				
Kenned Sted	Goliath	Recurring					
Seipati Motshwane	Augustine Modipa				Recurring		
Renate Stuurman	Sheree Jacobson	Recurring					
Nokuthula Ledwaba	Angelina Mthobeni	Recurring	Main	Main	Main	Main	Main
Thembinkosi Mthembu	Mathatho Dimba			Main	Main	Main	Main
TK Sebothoma	Happy Moloi	Main					
Anele Zondo	Faith Sibiya	Main	Recurring			Recurring	
Fezile Makhanya	Mqobi Luthuli					Recurring	
Zolani Phakade	Mkhize	Recurring					
Sannah Mchunu	Matilda Shabangu	Recurring	Recurring				
Lebohang Tlokana	Dora Phakathi	Recurring	Recurring				
Sello Maake Ka Ncube	Sechabe Mokoena	Guest		Guest			
Warren Masemola	Oupa Manamela	Recurring	Recurring	Recurring	Recurring		
Zenzo Ngqobe	Percy Motoung	Recurring	Recurring	Recurring	Recurring		
Thabo Malema	Ten Ten	Recurring	Recurring				
Seputla Sebogodi	Mohumi Ditshweni			Recurring	Recurring		
Patric Shai	Phasha				colspan="1"{{c		
Connie Ferguson	Harriet Khoza	Guest					

== Awards and nominations ==
Year	Award	Category	Nominee	Result	Ref.
2019	South African Film and Television Awards	Best Telenovela	The River	Won	
2019	South African Film and Television Awards	Best Actress - Telenovela	Moshidi Motshegwa	Won	
2019	South African Film and Television Awards	Best Actress - Telenovela	Sindi Dlathu	Nominated	
2019	South African Film and Television Awards	Best Actor - Telenovela	Presley Chweneyagae	Won	
2019	South African Film and Television Awards	Best Actor - Telenovela	Hlomla Dandala	Nominated	
2019	South African Film and Television Awards	Best Supporting Actor - Telenovela	Lawrence Maleka	Won	
2019	South African Film and Television Awards	Best Supporting Actor - Telenovela	Zenzo Ngqobe	Nominated	
2019	South African Film and Television Awards	Best Supporting Actress - Telenovela	Ferry Jele	Nominated	
2019	South African Film and Television Awards	Best Achievement in Directing - Telenovela	Johnny Barbuzano, Catharine Cooke, Zolani Phakade and Ferry Jele	Won	
2019	South African Film and Television Awards	Best Achievement in Scriptwriting – Telenovela	Gwydion Beynon & Phathutshedzo Makwarela	Won	
2019	South African Film and Television Awards	Best Achievement in Original Music/Score – Telenovela	Brendan Jury	Won	
2019	South African Film and Television Awards	Best Achievement in Editing – Telenovela	Ula Oelsen, Bongi Malefo & Matodzi Nemungadi	Won	
2019	South African Film and Television Awards	Best Achievement in Sound – Telenovela	Ben Oelsen, Lele Seate & Tladi Mabuya	Won	
2019	South African Film and Television Awards	Best Achievement in Cinematography – Telenovela	Gaopie Kabe & Trevor Brown	Won	
2019	South African Film and Television Awards	Best Achievement in Wardrobe − Telenovela	The River	Won	
2019	South African Film and Television Awards	Best Achievement in Hair & Make-Up − Telenovela	The River	Won	
2019	South African Film and Television Awards	Best Achievement in Art Direction − Telenovela	The River	Nominated	
2019	47th International Emmy Awards	Best Telenovela	The River	Nominated	
2020	South African Film and Television Awards	Best Achievement in Directing - Telenovela	Ferry Jele, Catharine Cooke, Zolani Phakade & Johnny Barbuzano	Won	
2020	South African Film and Television Awards	Best Achievement in Scriptwriting - Telenovela	Gwydion Beynon, Phathutshedzo Makwarela, Christa Biyela, Lebogang Mogashoa & Mamello Lebona	Won	
2020	South African Film and Television Awards	Best Achievement in Editing - Telenovela	Bongi Malefo, Matodzi Nemungadi & Ula Oelsen	Won	
2020	South African Film and Television Awards	Best Achievement in Sound - TV Soap/Telenovela	Ben Oelsen, Juli Vanden Berg & Tladi Steven Mabuya	Won	
2020	South African Film and Television Awards	Best Achievement in Cinematography - Telenovela	Trevor Brown	Won	
2020	South African Film and Television Awards	Best Achievement in Wardrobe - TV Soap/Telenovela	Alice Mataboge	Won	
2020	South African Film and Television Awards	Best Achievement in Make-Up and Hairstyling- TV Soap/Telenovela	Bongi Mlotshwa	Won	
2020	South African Film and Television Awards	Best Actress - Telenovela	Sindi Dlathu	Won	
2020	South African Film and Television Awards	Best Supporting Actress - Telenovela	Mary-Anne Barlow	Won	
2020	South African Film and Television Awards	Best Telenovela	The River	Won	
2021	South African Film and Television Awards	Best Achievement in Scriptwriting	The River	Won	
2021	South African Film and Television Awards	Best Achievement in Original Music/Score	The River	Won	
2021	South African Film and Television Awards	Best Achievement in Editing	The River	Won	
2021	South African Film and Television Awards	Best Achievement in Sound	The River	Won	
	South African Film and Television Awards	Best Achievement in Producing	The River	Won	
	South African Film and Television Awards	Best Achievement in Hair & Make-Up	The River	Nominated	
	South African Film and Television Awards	Best Achievement in Editing	The River	Won	
	South African Film and Television Awards	Best Telenovela	The River	Nominated	
	South African Film and Television Awards	Most Popular Telenovela	The River	Nominated	
	South African Film and Television Awards	Best Actress	Sindi Dlathu as Lindiwe Dlamini-Dikana	Nominated	
	South African Film and Television Awards	Best Actress	Tsholofelo Matshaba as Kedibone Mokoena	Nominated	
	South African Film and Television Awards	Best Actor	Presley Chweneyagae as Thuso Mokoena	Nominated	
	South African Film and Television Awards	Best Supporting Actor	Meshack Mavuso	Won	
