= Champions (South African TV series) =

South African drama television series

- Genre: Telenovela
- Created by: Phathutshedzo Makwarela; Gwydion Beynon
- Written by: Thato Dipholo; Shitshembiso Mabasa; Brigette Madiba; Florence Mashadi Rapeu
- Directed by: Krijay Govender
- Starring: Sello Maake Ka-Ncube; Jo-Anne Reyneke; Tumisho Masha; Thato Dithebe; Keitu Kasonkola; Kgomotso Christopher; Thabo Malema; Kwenzo Ngcobo; Thembinkosi Mthembu
- Country of origin: South Africa
- Original languages: English; Tswana; Zulu; Pedi
- No. of seasons: 1
- No. of episodes: 260

Production
- Executive producers: Phathutshedzo Makwarela; Gwydion Beynon
- Producer: Tshedza Pictures
- Camera setup: Multi-camera
- Running time: 22–24 minutes

Original release
- Network: Mzansi Magic
- Release: 5 February 2024 – 31 January 2025

Champions is a South African sports drama telenovela created by Phathutshedzo Makwarela and Gwydion Beynon. The series premiered on Mzansi Magic on 5 February 2024 and follows the lives of a powerful football dynamics and the struggles surrounding their club. Blending themes of ambition, family conflict and the business of sport, the show explores both the personal and professional challenges faced by players.

== Premise ==
Champions follows a wealthy and influential family Modise, that owns a prominent football club whose success is overshadowed by internal power struggles and personal conflicts. As tensions rise over control of the club, family members and those within their loyalty and betrayal both are on and off the field.

== Cast ==
=== Main cast ===
- Sello Maake Ka-Ncube as Washington Modise
- Jo-Anne Reyneke as Sinesipho Modise
- Tumisho Masha as Philemon Modise
- Thato Dithebe as Lebogang Serite
- Kgomotso Christopher as Lucinda Modise
- Kwenzo Ngcobo as Zipho Buthelezi
- Thembinkosi Mthembu as Sanele “Ferrari” Zulu
- Thabo Malema as Lesibana Serite
- Keitu Kasonkola as Nkele Serite

=== Supporting cast ===
- Obakeng Kgwedi as Mathapelo
- Thato Sefora as Thapelo Modise
- Minkie Malatji as Oratile Rapoo
- Rethabile Mohapi as Kgotso Modise
- Jose Domingos as Coach Les
- Brighton Mhlongo as Nyiko Mabasa
- Vikash Mathura as Doctor Lindo
- Ntobeko Mathebula as Richard Ramosamo
- Pholosho Kupa as Thabang Maisa
- Fezile Mkhize as Dr Mnisi
- Keke Mphuthi as Zipho's wife

== Production ==
Champions is a telenovela produced by Tshedza Pictures, a production house co-founded by [ Gwydion Beynon and Phathutshedzo Makwarela. Premiering on Mzansi Magic the series centers on the Soshanguve Giants F.C., following Sne Modise (played by Jo-Anne Reyneke) as she navigates the challenges of leading a soccer empire in a male dominated industry. The production features cast, including Sello Maake Ka-Ncube, Kgomotso Christopher, Thato Dithebe and Tumisho Masha, with Beynon and Makwarela serving as executive producers alongside series producer Candice Tennant.

== Release ==
The series premiered on Mzansi Magic from 5 February 2024 to 31 January 2025, airing Monday to Friday at 19:00.
