= The Estate (South African TV series) =

- Genre: telenovela
- Created by: Clive Morris Pictures
- Based on: Land Corruption and Politics
- Written by: Bongi Ndaba; Pamela Power
- Screenplay by: Helen Leon
- Directed by: Zuko Nodada; Sipho Nhlapho
- Starring: Jo-Anne Reyneke; Mduduzi Mabaso; Lorcia Khumalo
- Country of origin: South Africa
- Original languages: English; IsiZulu; Sepedi; IsiXhosa
- No. of seasons: 3

Production
- Executive producer: Khayelihle Dom Gumede
- Producer: Clive Morris
- Running time: 26-30 minutes (including commercial)
- Production company: Clive Morris Pictures

Original release
- Network: SABC 3
- Release: 18 April 2021

Related
- Legacy (South African TV series)

The Estate is a South African telenovela produced by Clive Morris Pictures for SABC 3. It stars Jo-Anne Reyneke, Sdumo Mtshali, Aubrey Pop, Zenokuhle Maseko, Mpho Sebeng, Jagculus Da Bling, and Mduduzi Mabaso. The series follows the lives of the gated community of Echelon, an estate stimulated by Muzi Phakathwayo through corruption and lies. When Shadrack Mokobane, a former employee at Echelon, reveals that the estate has been built on their land, the people of Thembalethu start boycotting the estate and making the lives of the Phakathwayo's and other residents of the estate hard.

== Cast ==
Actors	Characters	Seasons			
Actors	Characters	Season 1	Season 2	Season 3	Season 4
Jo-Anne Reyneke	Lwandle Phakathwayo	Main	Main	Main	Main
Zenokuhle Maseko	Sindisiwe Phakathwayo	Main	Main	Main	Main
Mduduzi Mabaso	Khulekani Ndzimande			Main	Main
Jacques Blignaut	Dr Martin Van Vayke	Recurring	Main	Main	Main
Lorcia Khumalo	Jo Mohammed-Van Vayke	Recurring	Main	Main	Main
Mpho Sebeng	Skhumbuzo Biyela-Mokobane			Main	Main
Didie Mokobane	Tsholofelo Motaung	Recurring	Recurring	Main	Main
Thandie Kgoroge	Minister Norah Mokoena			Recurring	
Lungelo Madondo	Karabelo			Main	Main
J-Flo	Thato			Recurring	Main
Lusanda Mbane	TBA				Main

== Former Cast ==
Actors	Characters
Sdumo Mtshali	Muzi Phakathwayo
Sparky Xulu	Siyabonga Phakathwayo
Dineo Langa	Advocate Makoena Molefe
Mathli Mohapeloa	Lesiba Molefe
Linda Sebezo	Goniwe Phakathwayo-Kamanga
Lerato Mvelase	Noxolo Ndzimande-Nobangela
Don Mlangeni Nawa	Shadrack Mokobane
Carla Calseen	Tessa Van Vaykes
Nadia Velveks	Suzann Le Roux
Anele Zondo	Phumzile Ndlovu
Aubrey Poo	Castro Kamanga
Bahle Hadebe	Phenyo Molefe
Mpho Sibeko	Dumsani Mokobane
Katlego "Katt"Motixce	Ayanda Nkosi
Nambitha Ben-Mazwi	Georgina Nkosi
Clementine Mosimane	Matshepo Mokobane
Dumsani Mbebe	Melisizwe Nobangela
Samke Makhoba	Gcinekile Nobangela
Siya Xaba	Vukani Nobangela
Thandile Kgoroge	Minster Norah Mokoena
