= Bae Beyond Borders =

African reality television series

- Genre: Reality television
- Countries of origin: South Africa; Nigeria
- Original languages: English; Zulu
- No. of seasons: 1
- No. of episodes: 9

Production
- Executive producer: Zinzi Velelo Alake
- Camera setup: Multiple
- Production company: POP24

Original release
- Network: Showmax
- Release: October 23, 2023 – present

Bae Beyond Borders is an African reality television series, produced by POP24 for Showmax. The show revolves around 4 single South African women, looking for love beyond the borders of South Africa in search of partner among 12 bachelors from Nigeria. Nokuthula Mashaba served as the co-director of the reality show, with Zinzi Velelo Alake who also serves as the executive producer.

== Cast ==
=== Season 1 ===
List of cast members with selected details.
| Name | Real Name | Age | Occupation | Country | Status |
|---|---|---|---|---|---|
| Zeze | Zezethu Mniki | 31 | Architect | South Africa | Single |
Zezethu Mniki is from Johannesburg, from a broken home, with an abusive father. She describes herself as an introvert. She says “I am a reserved person, but I am also outgoing. I love to dress up and do my makeup and go out and have fun. I love people; I love being around people. I love nature and animals and often enjoy outdoor activities. I also enjoy going to new places and interacting with people of different cultures.”
| Nande | Nande Ramncwana | 24 | Social media influencer; YouTuber; Content creator | South Africa | Single |
Nande Ramcwana is from the Eastern Cape and holds a diploma in Local Government Finance and an advanced diploma in Public Management. “Entering this show changed my life for the better,” she says. “There were so many invaluable lessons I got to learn about myself. I am going to use these lessons in my everyday life.”
| Mali | Malibongwe Gumede | 31 | Radio presenter; Radio producer | South Africa | Single |
Malibongwe Gumede is from Midrand, and describes herself as a strong and dynamic woman. In her words, she says “I love shopping, traveling, and going out with friends to eat some good food,” and further says, “Sometimes I can be an introvert and keep to myself.”
| Vuvu | Vuvu Maseti | 30 | Make-up artist | South Africa | Single |
Vuvu Maseti is from Johannesburg, and describes herself as a proudly South African girl who was raised in Manchester, England. In her words, she says “I love to socialise; I like to think of myself as an introverted-extrovert but I’m the life of the party (according to my friends). I’m attracted to intelligent, good-looking, tall men. I love the arts and being able to express my creativity through my makeup work.”
| Eric | Eric Oshiokhai Akhigbe | 27 | Fitness influencer; Model; Actor | Nigeria | Single |
Eric Oshiokhai Akhigbe is from Edo State. In his words, he says “I am willing to put myself out there finally. In a relationship, you have to constantly choose your partner, during your ups and downs that's the commitment, actually, and am all about that.”
| Luciano | Luciano Okere | 32 | Journalist; Businessman | Nigeria | Divorced |
Luciano Okere is from Lagos. In his words, he says “I am interested in getting to know South African women to see how dating outside of Nigeria is,”. He further says “I am big on love and exploring different cultures, so when this opportunity came about, I grabbed it with both hands. I am ready for my South African queen.”
| Chidubem | Chidubem Okeke | 31 | Software developer | Nigeria | Single |
Chidubem Okeke who has visited South Africa, and his older brother is married to a South African woman. In his words, he says “I have seen the beautiful love my brother and his wife share, and it inspires me to seek a similar connection for myself.”
| Kingsley | Kingsley Okparaebube Ndubuisi | 34 | Content creator; Actor; Model | Nigeria | Single |
Kingsley Okparaebube Ndubuisi from Imo State. In his words, he says “South African women are very beautiful; I like how they dance, how they move and how they look.” Kingsley also has relatives who are married to South African women. From what they have shared with him, he is very interested in finding one for himself. “I heard that South African women are good to build with and that they bring peace.”
| Joshua | Joshua Richard | 26 | Actor; Filmmaker; Writer | Nigeria | Single |
In his words, he says “I'm Igbo, my native name is Ifeanyi, which I believe means "God is my straight", I don't speak my native language.”
| Peejay | Edozie Peter Chigozie | 31 | Musician | Nigeria | Single |
In his words, he says “What will make me fall in love is someone who would choose to be with me whether I mess up or I don't. You don't find the perfect woman. You find someone who perfects you.”
| Daniel C. | Daniel Christian | 27 | Singer; Songwriter | Nigeria | Single |
Daniel Christian is from Anambra State. In his words, he says “A perfect relationship for me, has to be a calm woman. You can't be with a Nigerian man and be pompous. It won't work, you have to be patient and industrious, Yes we're not going broke, have to work hard together, side by side. Of course, I will be the major captain, then you can be the co-captain. That kind of thing.” Further, he says “Before I get into a relationship with you, I have to know how your family is. I have to see the structure of your family. It's very important because if her family is messed up, that woman is 100% a mess.”
| Amazn | Promise Amazing | 32 | Singer; Songwriter; Model | Nigeria | Single |
Promise Amazing is from Enugu State. In his words, he says “I am single because I want to be sure of what I want; I want to settle down. So basically get someone who is sure of what she's doing. I love it when a woman is caring, kind, compassionate, and a go-getter. I enjoy a woman who knows what she wants. A hardworking woman. A woman who can actually balance her emotions. I like a woman with a good sense of humor.”
| Franklyn | Franklyn Chikezie | 23 | Model | Nigeria | Single |
| Daniel | Daniel Emuan Osaro | 26 | Fitness trainer | Nigeria | Single |
Daniel Emuan Osaro is from Benin, the capital and largest city of Edo State. In his words, he says “I like very natural girls, like physical speaking, with the figure 8.”
| Babatunde | Babatunde | 28 | Musician | Nigeria | Single |
| Jazzy | Odudu Otu | 24 | Fitness; Fashion Model; Actor | Nigeria | Single |
Odudu Otu from Akwa Ibom, where he was born and raised with his two younger brothers and parents. In search of greener pastures, he relocated to Abuja at the age of 20.

==== Couples progress ====
Name Unconfirmed Perfect Match N/A

| Couple | Episode | Result | Twelve Boy |
|---|---|---|---|
| Zezethu & Kingsley | 2 | Not A Match | Not A Match |
| Zezethu & Peejay | 3 | Perfect Match | Not A Match |
| Vuvu & Daniel C. | 4 | Not A Match | Not A Match |
| Nande & Daniel C. | 4 | Perfect Match | Not A Match |
| Vuvu & Luciano | 4 | Not A Match | Not A Match |
| Mali & Daniel C. | 5 | Not A Match | Not A Match |
| Nande & Chidubem | 6 | Not A Match | Not A Match |
| Mali & Luciano | 6 | Perfect Match | Not A Match |
| Mali & Promise | 6 | Not A Match | Not A Match |
| Vuvu & Joshua | 6 | Not A Match | Not A Match |
| Vuvu & Eric | 6 | Not A Match | Not A Match |
| Vuvu & Chidubem | 6 | Perfect Match | Not A Match |
| Mali & Luciano | 7 | Unmatched | Amazn |
| Mali & Amazn | 8 | Perfect Match | Not A Match |

==== Weekly summary ====
The main events in the Bae Beyond Borders villa are summarised in the table below.

| Week 1 | Online Date | On Day 1, all four South African ladies had an online date with all twelve Nigerian men. |
| Week 1 | Entrances | On Day 2, Zezethu, Nande, Malibongwe, and Vuvu entered the Lady's villa in Cape Town.; On Day 2, Eric, Luciano, Chidubem, Kingsley, Joshua, Peejay, Daniel C., Amazn, Franklyn, Daniel, Babatunde, and Jazzy entered the Gents villa. |
| Week 1 | Exits | On Day 3, all four ladies were asked to pick their top 8, based on who they were feeling after the online day. After their decisions, Franklyn, Daniel, Babatunde, and Jazzy got dumped through a video message, sent by the ladies. |
| Week 2 | Entrances | On Day 4, Zezethu, Nande, Malibongwe, and Vuvu arrived in Nigeria and entered the Lady's villa in Lagos. |
| Week 2 | Hang Out | On Day 5, the guys invite the girls out to the beach to hang out and get to know each other. |
| Week 3 | Date | On Day 6, Mali was able to take two boys on dates. She chose Joshua and Eric; On Day 6, Nande was able to take two boys on dates. She chose Chidubem and Daniel C., while Daniel couldn't make it, she picked Amazn as a replacement.; On Day 7, Vuvu was able to take two boys on dates. She chose Luciano and Daniel C.; On Day 7, Zeze was able to take two boys on dates. She chose Kingsley and Peejay |
| Week 4 | Hang Out | On Day 8, they all hang out at a Lounge and get to connect more with each other. |
| Week 5 | Date | On Day 9, Nande was able to take two boys on dates. She chose Daniel C. and Eric; On Day 9, Vuvu was able to take two boys on dates. She chose Eric and Chidubem; On Day 10, Mali was able to take two boys on dates. She chose Daniel C. and Luciano; On Day 10, Zeze was able to take two boys on dates. She chose Peejay and Luciano |
| Week 6 | Exits | On Day 11, Nande picked Daniel C. and dumped Chidubem; On Day 11, Vuvu picked Chidubem and dumped Eric and Joshua; On Day 11, Mali picked Luciano and dumped Amazn; On Day 11, Zeze picked Peejay and said goodbye to Kingsley, who picked her over everyone from the beginning of the show |
| Week 6 | Date | On Day 12, Zezethu & Peejay, Nande & Daniel C., Mali & Luciano, and Vuvu & Chidubem went on their final dates in Lagos. |
| Week 7 | Travel | On Day 13, Zezethu, Nande, Mali, and Vuvu took a flight to South Africa, with Peejay, Daniel C., Luciano, and Chidubem. |
| Week 7 | Entrances | On Day 14, they arrived at the villa in Cape Town.; On Day 14, Zezethu, Nande, Mali, and Vuvu participated in a game titled. How well do you know your bae?. Zezethu was crowned the winner and she moved into the master room with Peejay. |
| Week 7 | Hang Out | On Day 15, Peejay, Daniel C., Luciano, and Chidubem participated in a game titled. How well do you know your bae?. Peejay & Daniel C. had a tie, and Peejay was crowned the winner, after Mali & Luciano, and Vuvu & Chidubem put them to the test.; On Day 15, Zezethu & Peejay, Nande & Daniel C., Mali & Luciano, and Vuvu & Chidubem went on their first hangout in Cape Town. |
| Week 7 | Exits | On Day 15, Mali dumped Luciano, and picked back Promise, requesting he come to Cape Town. |
| Week 8 | Date | On Day 16, Zezethu & Peejay, Nande & Daniel C., and Vuvu & Chidubem went on dates |
| Week 8 | Entrances | On Day 17, Amazn arrived at the villa in Cape Town. |
| Week 9 | Hang Out | On Day 18, the guys hang out together.; On Day 18, the girls hang out together. |

== Series overview ==
| Season | Episodes | Originally released | |
| Season | Episodes | First released | Last released |
|---|---|---|---|
| 1 | 9 | October 23, 2023 | December 18, 2023 |

== Episodes ==
=== Season 1 (2023) ===
| No. overall | No. in series | Title | Original release date | Viewers (millions) |
|---|---|---|---|---|
| 1 | 1 | "The African Love Story Begins" | 23 October 2023 | N/A |
Four single South African ladies are on a quest to find love in Nigeria. During the first round of dating, Southie babes jump on online dates with 12 Nigerian bachelors.
| 2 | 2 | "Southern Girls Finally Meet The Naija Boys" | 30 October 2023 | N/A |
Zezethu, Nande, Mali and Vuvu travel to Nigeria to meet their potential baes at the sandy beach. The gents put their best foot forward to impress the ladies, but who will be chosen for the first one-on-one dates?
| 3 | 3 | "Chop The Money Or The Man?" | 6 November 2023 | N/A |
Nande goes on a one-on-one date, but Daniel C ghosts her. Mali is infatuated with Eric and confused by Joshua. Vuvu is smitten with Daniel C. Zezethu is promised marriage by Kingsley. Perfect Match #1: Zezethu & Peejay
| 4 | 4 | "I Bet You A 100K You Won't Take My Girl!" | 13 November 2023 | N/A |
Malibongwe catches a whiff of new love. Nande plays hard to get with Daniel C. Zezethu ends things with Kingsley while Peter sits on his throne. Perfect Match #2: Nande & Daniel C.
| 5 | 5 | "You Better Not Take My Man, Sneaky Snake!" | 20 November 2023 | N/A |
Mali sneakily goes on a date with Daniel C without Nande's knowledge. Zezethu finally meets up with Luciano but seals her love with Peter in a jacuzzi. Vuvu's date with Chidu flops, but she enjoys an intimate moment with Eric.
| 6 | 6 | "Toast to Love & Shattering of Friendships" | 27 November 2023 | N/A |
Tension erupts at the girls' villa as Nande and Vuvu confront Malibongwe about her shady behaviour. The ladies have to make their final selection on who to take to South Africa. Perfect Match #3: Mali & Luciano Perfect Match #4: Vuvu & Chidubem
| 7 | 7 | "Games, Break-up & Possible Make-up" | 4 December 2023 | N/A |
The four couples arrive in South Africa and celebrate their first night with a braai. Malibongwe is forced to share some big news with Luciano that could alter their future plans. Unmatched #1: X Mali & Luciano
| 8 | 8 | "Second Option Or Second Chance?" | 11 December 2023 | N/A |
Couples take the major leap to solidify their love. Chidubem makes it official with Vuvu. The newly single Malibongwe gets a second chance as Promise shows up on her doorstep. Perfect Match #5: Mali & Amazn
| 9 | 9 | "A Love Crossroads, Who Will Lock In" | 18 December 2023 | N/A |
It’s the finale, and the ladies must finally decide if their love will survive beyond borders. A confrontation breaks out amongst the gents, leaving Peter and Zezethu’s relationship vulnerable. Will they make it to the end?

Matching progress
Decisions are made by Zezethu Mniki, Nande Ramncwana, Malibongwe Gumede, and Vuvu Maseti on who gets evicted while looking for a perfect match.

| | Episode 1 Top 8 | Episode 2 | Episode 3 | Episode 4 | Episode 5 | Episode 6 | Episode 7 | Episode 8 |
|---|---|---|---|---|---|---|---|---|
| Chidubem Okeke | Saved | No; Nominations | | | | Perfect Match; Day 11 | No; Nominations | |
| Edozie Peter Chigozie | Saved | No; Nominations | | | | Perfect Match; Day 11 | No; Nominations | |
| Daniel Christain | Saved | No; Nominations | | | | Perfect Match; Day 11 | No; Nominations | |
| Luciano Okere | Saved | No; Nominations | | | | Perfect Match; Day 11 | Unmatched and Dumped; Day 15 | |
| Promise Amazing | Saved | No; Nominations | | | | Dumped; Day 11 | | Nominated; Day 15 |
| Kingsley Okparaebube Ndubuisi | Saved | No; Nominations | | | | Dumped; Day 11 | | |
| Joshua Richard | Saved | No; Nominations | | | | Dumped; Day 11 | | |
| Eric Oshiokhai Akhigbe | Saved | No; Nominations | | | | Dumped; Day 11 | | |
| Franklyn Chikezie | Dumped; Day 3 | | | | | | | |
| Daniel Emuan Osaro | Dumped; Day 3 | | | | | | | |
| Jazzy | Dumped; Day 3 | | | | | | | |
| Babatunde | Dumped; Day 3 | | | | | | | |

Perfect Match
Unmatched and Dumped
Saved
Nominated
No Nominations
Dumped

== Production ==
The reality television series is executively produced by Zinzi Velelo Alake. On 9 October 2023, Showmax Stories shared a hint about the series and introduced its cast with its official trailer, unveiling Zezethu Mniki, Nande Ramncwana, Malibongwe Gumede, and Vuvu Maseti as the main cast of season 1, to be supported by Eric Oshiokhai Akhigbe, Luciano Okere, Chidubem Okeke, Kingsley Okparaebube Ndubuisi, Joshua Richard, Peejay Edozie, Daniel Christain, AMAZN, Franklyn, Daniel, Babatunde, and Jazzy.

== Controversies ==
On 12 October 2023, Bae Beyond Borders became controversial as Showmax and DSTV channel Honey was dragged by Nombuso Thobejane and her business partner Kwaile Lebopo, after Bae Beyond Borders trailer went viral. Nombuso and Kwaile said in the viral video “We had pitched the idea to Honey on 29 May this year under the name Loving Beyond Borders.” They further said how Showmax and Honey rejected the proposal for the show, asking them to: “Hold off until next year as they were not commissioning at that time and noted that they would be launching a dating format later this year.” However, Honey channel head Izelle Venter; debunked the claims labelled against them.

== Reception ==
=== Awards and nominations ===
| Year | Award | Category | Recipient | Result | Ref |
|---|---|---|---|---|---|
| 2024 | South African Film & Television Awards | Best Structured Sophie Reality Show | Bae Beyond Borders | Nominated | |
