= List of previous 7de Laan cast members =

The following is an alphabetical list of previous cast members of the SABC 2 soap opera 7de Laan, sorted by the performer's last name. The role the performer played and the dates when the performer appeared (when available) are listed alongside the performer.

== B ==
- Beata Bena Green - Shady Vermeulen
- Jacques Blignaut - Vince Meintjies
- Ivan Botha - Pieter van Heerden
- Quinne Brown Huffman - Connie Vosloo

== C ==
- Werner Coetser - Bernard Jordaan (?–2016)
- Kyle Clark - Sudesh Reddy
- Corné Crous - Kim Conradie (?-2016)

== D ==
- Jo da Silva - Gita McGregor (?-2016)
- Melanie du Bois - Felicity Daniels Croukamp (?-2016)

== E ==
- Vinette Ebrahim - Chamaine Meintjies (2000–2019), Vivian Williams

== F ==
- Liaan Ferreira

== G ==
- Mila Guy - Lana van Deventer

== H ==
- Steve Hofmeyr - Brandt van den Bergh
- Heino Schmidt - Altus De Bryn

== J ==
- Hennie Jacobs - Diederik Greyling
- Theodore Jantjies - Xander Meintjies (2005–2020)

== K ==
- Tony Kgoroge - Gcobani Mthathi

== L ==
- Diann Lawrenson - Paula van der Lecq-de Bruyn
- Francois Lensley - Marko Greyling

== M ==
- Dann-Jacques Mouton - Justin Booysen
- Salamina Mosese - Nthabiseng Masilo
- Marcus Muller - Andre Vosloo

== N ==
- Denise Newman - Daleen Meintjies

== P ==
- Nico Panagio - George Kyriakis
- Anelisa Phewa - Sifiso (?-2016)
- Pierre van Pletzen - "Oubaas" Septimus van Zyl (2000–2017)
- Elma Postma - Dezi Terreblanche

== R ==
- Deánré Reiners - Shawn Basson
- Sabelo Radebe - Rhulani Chauke
- Donnalee Roberts - Annelie van Dyk

== S ==
- Blyde Smit - Gabby Kemp
- Linda Sokhulu - Tumi Selepe
- Neil Sandilands - Bart Kruger
- Masego Sehoole - Pulane
- Shaleen Surtie-Richards - Dorothy Daniels

== T ==
- Themsie Times - Maria Zibula (2003?-2016)

== U ==
- Amalia Uys - San-Mari van Graan

== V ==
- Karin van der Laag - Hettie Bothma
- Wilhelm van der Walt - Tyrone 'Ty' Prinsloo (?-2016)

== W ==
- Hannelie Warren - Augusta Visagie
- Annelisa Weiland - Hilda de Kock (2000–2019)
- Marius Weyers - Tim Jordaan
- Rubin Wissing - Ludo Venter
