= Silver Lakes, Pretoria =

Silver Lakes
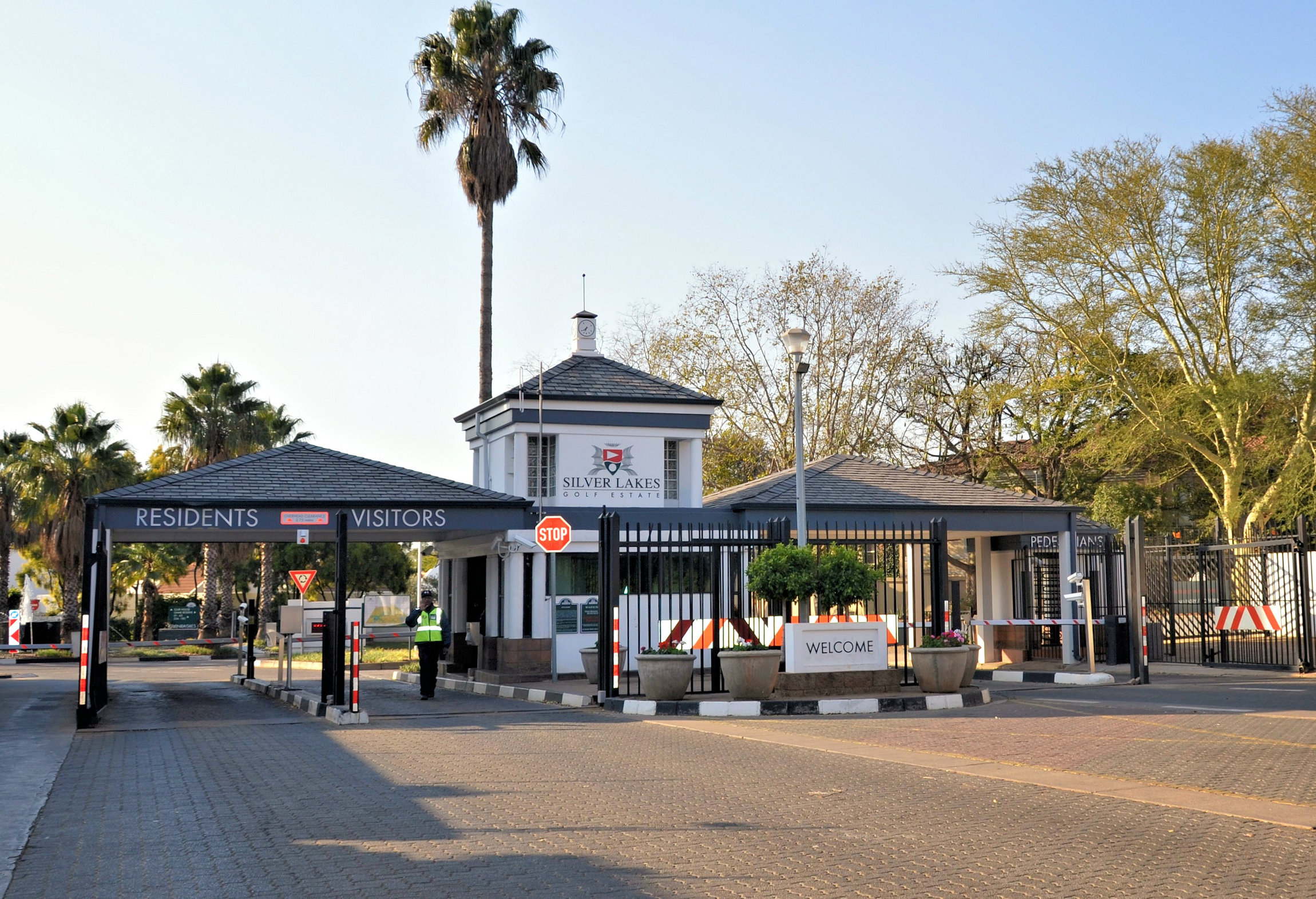
- Silver Lakes Golf Estate

- Location within Gauteng Location within South Africa
- Coordinates: 25°47′6″S 28°21′11″E
- Country: South Africa
- Province: Gauteng
- Municipality: City of Tshwane
- Main Place: Pretoria

Area
  - Total: 0.22 km^{2} (0.085 sq mi)

Population (2011)
  - Total: 599
  - Density: 2,700/km^{2} (7,100/sq mi)

Racial makeup (2011)
  - Black African: 37.7%
  - Coloured: 1.5%
  - Indian/Asian: 4.3%
  - White: 48.9%
  - Other: 7.5%

First languages (2011)
  - Afrikaans: 35.9%
  - English: 24.5%
  - Northern Sotho: 10.0%
  - Zulu: 5.7%
  - Other: 23.9%
- Time zone: UTC+2 (SAST)
- Postal code (street): 0081
- PO box: 0054
- Area code: 012

Silver Lakes is an eastern residential area of Pretoria, South Africa. It lies on the northern slopes of the Bronberg, part of the Magaliesberg mountains.
