= Bernini (disambiguation) =

Gian Lorenzo Bernini was an Italian sculptor and architect.

Bernini may also refer to:

- Bernini (surname), people with the surname
- Bernini (fashion), an American clothing company
- Bernini (crater), a crater on Mercury
- Bernini (Turin Metro), a rapid transit station in Turin, Italy
