= Beata Bena Green =

South African actress and media creative

Beáta Bena Green
- Born: 15 May 1996 (age 30); South Africa
- Other name: Beáta Bena
- Education: Stellenbosch University
- Occupations: Actress, producer, media creative
- Years active: 2018–present
- Height: 1.73 m (5 ft 8 in)

Beáta Bena Green, known professionally as Beáta Bena, is a South African actress and media creative. She is known for her television roles as Kim Claasen in the KykNET & Kie telenovela Arendsvlei, Shady Vermeulen in the South African soap opera 7de Laan and Shay Gumede in the Showmax series Wyfie.

== Early life and education ==
Green is from the Western Cape and attended Hottentots Holland High School in Somerset West, where she participated in school productions and school radio and later served as head girl. She went on to complete a BA degree and an Honours degree at Stellenbosch University.

== Career ==
Green made her television debut in 2018 as Kim Claasen in the KykNET telenovela Arendsvlei. In 2019, she appeared as Tasneem in Die Spreeus and as Siena in the American political thriller Deep State.

In 2020, Green joined the cast of the Afrikaans television soap opera 7de Laan as Shady Vermeulen. She later appeared in productions including Projek Dina and Ben & Bez.

In 2024, Green played Shay, one of the main characters in the Showmax series Wyfie. For her performance, she received a Best Actress in a Telenovela or Soap nomination at the 2024 kykNET Silwerskerm Awards. She was also nominated for Best Actress in a TV Series at the 2024 National Film and Television Awards South Africa.

In 2025, Green joined the cast of the kykNET drama series Appels en Tee.

Alongside her screen work, Green produced and hosted the podcast series Two Truths & Alive.

== Filmography ==
Year	Title	Genre	Role
2018 to 2020	Arendsvlei	Telenovela	Kim Claasen
2019	Die Spreeus	Supernatural crime drama	Tasneem
2019	Deep State	Political thriller	Siena
2020 to 2023	7de Laan	Soap opera	Shady Vermeulen
2020	Projek Dina	Crime drama	Jolene
2021	Ben & Bez	Comedy	Bond Girl
2023 to 2024	Wyfie	Young adult drama	Shay
2024	Die Byl	Crime drama	Maria
2025	Appels en Tee	Drama series	Monique

== Awards and nominations ==
Year	Award	Category	Nominated work	Result
2024	kykNET Silwerskerm Awards	Best Actress in a Telenovela or Soap	Wyfie	Nominated
2024	National Film and Television Awards South Africa	Best Actress in a TV Series	Wyfie	Nominated
