= The Adventures of Noko Mashaba =

South African animated sociopolitical satire

- Genre: Satire; Black comedy Adventure
- Created by: Jonas Lekganyane
- Inspired by: South Park
- Voices of: Katisho Mogashoa; Joey Lekganyane; Nash Maoasha; Jonas Lekganyane; Sbusiso Cossa; Sylvester Mphahlele
- Theme music composer: Jonas Lekganyane
- Opening theme: The Adventures of Noko Mashaba Theme
- Country of origin: South Africa
- Original languages: Sepedi; English; Zulu; Tswana

Production
- Executive producer: Jonas Lekganyane
- Running time: 5-15 minutes
- Production company: Rams Comics (Pty) Ltd.

Original release
- Network: YouTube
- Release: 2013

Related
- The Dons Show

The Adventures of Noko Mashaba is a South African animated sociopolitical satire web series created by a self-taught animator and university dropout Jonas Lekganyane for Soweto TV, Ekurhuleni TV and YouTube. Intended for any audience, the show is inspired by the American adult animated sitcom South Park and centers around a fictional character – Noko Mashaba – an ordinary guy hailing from the calm streets of Limpopo, who occasionally ventures on extraordinary adventures to unravel mysteries and relive urban legends. On the show Mashaba always finds himself in informative, controversial and attention-grabbing situations.

The series was created in early 2013 and premiered on YouTube with one episode called "Noko & the Famous Venda Tree" – an episode about a mythological tree from the deep ends of Venda, South Africa, which supposedly extends men's penises if planted in the right manner. The series first went viral over the internet after the release of the episode called "Noko in High School". The show focuses on current affairs, corruption, celebrity scandals, urban legends, history and random humor.

Lekganyane developed the series in 2013 after being obliged to drop out of varsity due to financial difficulties. After a few months, he started his own animation company called Rams Comics. The production company that produces the adventures of Noko Mashaba and other cartoon shows such as The Dons Show.

An episode of the show called "Noko vs. Izikhothane" was rated as the most watched YouTube video of the year by Google when it revealed the most watched videos of the year in South Africa 2014. In 2015, two of the episodes of the show made their way to Google's Top 10 most viewed YouTube videos in South Africa. The show has made a number of features on a number of South African television shows. In early 2014, the show made its debut TV feature on an ETV show called Against All Odds with Mpho Lakage, which was a profiling interview about the creator Jonas Lekganyane, followed by Mzansi Insider, 100% Youth and Sunday Live on SABC. In 2015, Noko Mashaba won the South African Film, Art, Music & Entertainment award (FAME) for best comedian. In 2016, Rams Comics along with Supa Strikas shared the comic category award of the YouTube Sub-Saharan Africa Creator YouTube awards.

== Premise ==
=== Setting and characters ===
The series features characters inspired by people that exist in real life and famous South African personalities. It starts with a disclaimer similar to South Park's tongue-in-cheek disclaimer: "All characters and events in the following clip—even those based on real people—are entirely fictional. All celebrity voices are impersonated... Poorly."

The show follows the intriguing life of a fictional character, Noko Mashaba. Mashaba is an audacious chap, well known for his humorous personality, created and voiced by Jonas Lekganyane. Noko was raised by his grandmother; his parents were political activist in the South African apartheid era. They disappeared with other activists into exile before their son could speak. Noko is in between jobs, in some episodes he is a Barbershop owner, some he is the president's right-hand man, some he is unemployed but most of the time he appears as a cop. His numerous occupations often set the central plot of their respective episodes. Before Mashaba could apply for any job he is obliged to first obtain his Matric certificate.

Mashaba always has a sidekick with him, one of his sidekicks is Phusu – an intellectual Sangoma/wizard, who graduated at a fictional university called "Loying University" and obtained a degree in "Loying Engineering". Phusu combines the art of sorcery and science to solve the unsolvable, which makes him a remarkably exceptional Sangoma.

Mashaba's second sidekick is Mthembu - a short and chubby man with big eyes and also Noko's mute cop partner. One of the career paths that Mashaba chooses is becoming a police detective. Mthembu has been featured on several episodes and all those episodes he has never said a single word. He only cares arresting the bad guys and going home. He doesn't speak too much, but when he does he makes sense. He has bad luck for being in the wrong place at the wrong time but luckily he has a friend – Noko Mashaba – who always comes to his rescue.

Mashaba was raised by his witch grandmother, who is not hard to miss because of her odd skin color and her impaired eye form. She graduated at Loying school before Phusu and obtained the same degree as him. She wears a pierced gold ring across her nose interior that illustrates her fearlessness. She also wears a black witch hat and a long maroon coat. Gogo Mashaba's age is not known but it is estimated to be in eons. She spent all her life "eating and sleeping witchcraft" that, over the eons she became the most feared and powerful sorcerer ever known. However, she became obsessed with testing her sorcery abilities that she ended up going to the mysterious mountain of Modimolle. She disappeared and is still missing.

Donald Mashaba also known as Malome Dons (Pedi term for Uncle Dons) is Noko's greedy and stubborn uncle who is also an example of many South African men that live life by the motto – mottoes such as "you only live once" or "life is too short to use rubber" etc. which is the reason why he is in a maintenance mess. Dons spends most of his time unemployed, but he does get employed, all his money goes to child support because he has 14 kids with 5 different mothers. Dons is also voiced by Lekganyane.

Tjortan "Slyfish" Motaung is Noko Mashaba's short-tempered school teacher and the HOD of Maths & Science at the school. He holds a degree in applied mathematics and science. Mashaba and Motaung don't see eye to eye and since Motaung has a short temper & anger management issues, he sometimes gets carried away to a point of misconduct. He's made it his personal mission to get Noko suspended out of the school because he simply does not cooperate in class. Motaung later becomes a policeman. Motaung is inspired by Lekganyane's late primary teacher.

Lastly, Mahlodi is Mashaba's high school sweetheart. She is a strong and independent woman who believes in equality between men and women in both the workplace and relationships. Mahlodi comes from a fairly wealthy family; she bails Noko out of bad situations almost every time. She uses that power to win gender equality arguments against Noko.

The series uses a few South African languages compromising Sepedi, isiZulu, Setswana and English. It also uses small amounts of Fanagalo and an abundant mixture of street slang. Mashaba has popularised a few street slang words such as "Abashwe" or "Habashwe", which is originally known to the Tswana people and Pedi people as a sentence that means let them die. However, as a slang word, the term means Let's do this. The videos are intentionally in Jonas' home language, Sepedi. The animated characters he grew up watching were always Western and English speaking and he feels it is important for young people to preserve their languages.

== Origins and creation ==
Right after dropping out of University of Pretoria in 2013, Lekganyane began educating himself about two-dimensional animation using Google, Animation forums and YouTube tutorials. He then practiced drawing on a computer while developing his first animated visuals using Windows Paint & Windows Movie Maker. A month later, he had released his first animated video titled Night shift with Khaphela featuring a local soapie Generations' former actor Khaphela and a gigantic bee called Nthato. Soon after that, Lekganyane created the first image of Noko Mashaba inspired by his close friend Soul Mashaba. At the time, Noko Mashaba wore a green cap, with his Afro hairstyle hidden inside and long brown shoes. The first episode that aired on YouTube was "Noko & the famous Venda tree", which was released in March 2013 then a few more episodes were released until the release of an episode called "Noko & The spear" - which followed the controversial issue about the South African painting of the South African president Jacob Zuma called The Spear. This is the episode where Noko's uncle was introduced as a crossover character. Uncle Dons later appeared in his own show called The Dons Show which premiered with a webisode called Jesus is back & black - an episode that was inspired by a true story that made the headlines about a man from Kwa-Zulu-Natal who claimed to be the reincarnation of Jesus Christ.

In 2014, Lekganyane released a high school themed series of episodes where Mashaba appeared as a misbehaving & reluctant high school student. The first episode called Noko in high school, followed by Noko vs Izikhothane reaching millions of YouTube users and mobile users across South Africa, Botswana and other African countries. A sequel to the episode was released under the title Noko vs Izkikhothane Part 2 which also went viral.

== Production ==
=== Development ===
Initial stages of the development of the each episode are conceptualizing, screenwriting, traditional hand-drawing & digital character rigging. All the scripts are written by Jonas Lekganyane with ideas inspired by his daily experiences and current affairs. He then sketches the characters on a piece of paper and scans them using a digital printer into a computer. When all the characters have been digitally rigged, Lekganyane uses his cousins and friends for voice overs because, when he started, he could not afford to hire professional voice-over artists. Lekganyane's method of animation neglects other animation steps such as story-boarding and animatics. On completion of voice-over recording, Jonas animates the final product and lip syncs it with the voice-overs. The last stages of development include sound production, editing and subtitling. To avoid paying for copyrighted music and getting slammed with lawsuits, Lekganyane also produces the music and sound effects for the series.

== Awards ==
Year	Award	Work	Result	Ref.
2015	South Africa Film, Art, Music & Entertainment (FAME) awards		Won	

Year	Award	Work	Result	Ref.
2016	YouTube Southern Africa Comics		Won	

Year	Award	Work	Result	Ref.
2021	South Africa Film and Television Awards (SAFTAs)		Won	
