= Refilwe =

- Location within Gauteng Location within South Africa
- Coordinates: 25.639°S 28.528°E
- Country: South Africa
- Province: Gauteng
- Municipality: City of Tshwane

Area
  - Total: 2.58 km^{2} (1.00 sq mi)

Population (2011)
  - Total: 19,757
  - Density: 7,660/km^{2} (19,800/sq mi)

Racial makeup (2011)
  - Black African: 98.6%
  - Coloured: 0.8%
  - Indian/Asian: 0.1%
  - White: 0.1%
  - Other: 0.4%

First languages (2011)
  - Northern Sotho: 51.6%
  - Zulu: 9.8%
  - S. Ndebele: 9.3%
  - Sotho: 6.8%
  - Other: 22.5%
- Time zone: UTC+2 (SAST)
- PO box: 1003

Refilwe (Sotho: We are given/gifted unto us) is a township north of the historical town of Cullinan, east of Pretoria in Gauteng Province, South Africa.
