= Kgomotso Christopher =

South African actress

- Born: Kgomotso Maria Molefe; 25 March 1979 (age 47); Soweto, South African
- Education: BA University of Witwatersrand
- Occupation: Actress
- Years active: 2008-Present
- Known for: Yvonne Langa on Scandal!
- Spouse: Calvin Christopher (m. 2004)
- Children: 2
- Relatives: Mampho Bresicia (sister)

Kgomotso Christopher (nee Molefe born 25 March 1979) is a South African actress best known for her appearance in Isidingo as Katlego Sibeko before joining Scandal as the character of Yvonne "YV" Langa. She is also the voice behind MTN's Interactive Voice Response system and serves as a Non-Executive Chairperson on the Naledi Theatre Awards Board of Directors.

== Education and career ==
Kgomotso did her Bachelor of Arts degree in Law and Politics at the University of Cape Town. She was awarded the Jules Kramer Award for Fine Arts when she graduated. In 2004 she earned a Masters of Fine Arts in Theatre Arts at Columbia University in New York City. She continued to live and work in the US and UK until 2008. Kgomotso made guest appearance on television series Madam & Eve, SOS, Backstage, and Moferefere Lenyalong. She has made appearances in theatre productions of Romeo & Juliet, Midsummer Night's Dream, Hamlet and Dr. Faustus. On 15 November 2018 Kgomotso revealed on Instagram that she is the voice behind MTN's Interactive Voice Response system.

== Filmography ==
=== Television ===
Year	Title	Role	Notes
2010 - 2012	4Play: Sex Tips for Girls	Nox Madondo	Season 1, 2 & 3
2011 - 2016	Isidingo	Katlego Sibeko	Season 1
2013	Zaziwa	Herself	Season 1
2014	The Comedy Central Roast	Herself	1 Episode
2016	Moferefere Lenyalong	Cameo	Season 1
2016 - 2020	Scandal!	Yvonne	Season 1
2017	Thola	Ramatla Moleleki	Season 2
2020 - 2022	Legacy	Dineo Price	Season 1 - 2
2023 - present	Fatal Seduction	Nandi	Season 1 - 3
2024 -present	Generations: The Legacy	Keabetswe Moloi	Season 1
2024	Champions	Lucinda Modise	Season 1

=== Film ===
Year	Title	Role	Notes
2017	Zulu Wedding	Rene	

== Personal life ==
Kgomotso is married to Calvin Christopher.
