= Linda Mtoba =

South African actress and influencer (born 1991)

- Born: Linda Mtoba; 11 November 1991 (age 34); Umlazi, KwaZulu Natal, South Africa
- Education: University of Nairobi
- Occupations: Actress; influencer; model
- Years active: 2016–present
- Notable work: Isibaya; The River
- Spouse: Steven Mayers (m. 2017; div. 2022)
- Children: 1

Linda Mtoba (born 11 November 1991) is a South African actress, influencer and model. She is known for her roles in the Mzansi Magic telenovelas Isibaya as Zama Ngwenya and The River as Nomonde Dikana. She was named the global brand ambassador of Huggies in 2020. She was included in Forbes 30 Under 30 list.

== Life and career ==
=== Early life ===
Linda Mtoba was born on 11 November 1991, in Umlazi, KwaZulu Natal, South Africa to a Xhosa family. She was raised by her mother and her grandparents along her brother. Her father died when she was 13 years of age, but she grew up with a stepfather that played a role of being a good father to her and brother. She attended the University of Nairobi, where she obtained Bachelor of Commerce in IT (Information Technology).

=== Career ===
Before she involved in the entertainment industry, Mtoba work as a qualified teacher in an elementary school, but she retired to pursue her career in acting and media.

Mtoba began her acting career in 2016 where she made her first television debut in Mzansi Magic soap opera Isibaya as Zama Ngwenya. She later played the starring in telenovela The River as Nomonde Dikana in 2018. In 2020, she was named the brand ambassador for Huggies. The following year, she played a role of Lerato in Showmax movie One Night KwaMxolosi. She was also the brand ambassador for Bernini.

In 2022, Mtoba was named the face of Vaseline and worked with Samsung Galaxy for brand partnership. In 2023, she also played the role of Nokwanda on Isifiso season 2 and joined Gagasi FM. In 2024, she played the lead role on BET Africa telenovela Queendom as Ntandokayise Mthombeni. She hosted 2024 Mama Play Date Family event. In 2025, was named one of the top beauty influencers in South Africa. She was featured in Glamour SA magazine cover.

== Filmography ==
Year	Film	Role	Notes
2017	Isibaya	Zama Ngwenya	Starring role, season 2
2018	The River	Nomonde Dikana	Main role, season 1 to 6
2021	One Night KwaMxolosi	Lerato	Starring role
2023	Isifiso	Nokwanda	Main role, season 2
2024	Queendom	Ntandokayise Mthombeni	Lead role, season 1

== Personal life ==
In 2017, she married Steven Meyer, a businessman and model, they have a one child. In 2024 they divorced after six years of marriage. She is known for sharing glimpses of her personal life on social media, giving her fans a sneak peek into her family life.

== Philanthropy ==
Mtoba is involved with several charitable organizations, including the South African charity, "Dignity Dreams," which provides sanitary products to underprivileged girls. She has also supported other causes, such as cancer awareness and education.

== Awards and nominations ==
Year	Award	Category	Work	Result	Ref
2017	Feather Award	Hot chick of the Year	Herself	Won	
2018	Royalty Sopie Awards	Best Supporting Actress	As Zama on Isibaya	Nominated	
2022	South African Social Media Awards	Fashion Influencer of the Year	Herself	Won	
2022	South African Social Media Awards	Beauty Influencer of the Year	Herself	Won	
2024	Content Creator Awards	Trendsetter of the Year	Herself	Won	
