= Nandi Nyembe =

South African actress (1950–2025)

- Born: 19 January 1950; Kliptown, Johannesburg, Transvaal, Union of South Africa
- Died: 23 August 2025 (aged 75); South Africa
- Occupation: Actress
- Years active: 1986–2025
- Children: 1 daughter

Nandi Nyembe (19 January 1950 – 23 August 2025) was a South African actress known for her roles in the sports drama Zone 14, and Soul City.

== Early life ==
Nyembe was born in Kliptown, Johannesburg on 19 January 1950. She also stayed in various places, like Botswana and East London, when she was young. Nyembe has shared how she used to always be cast as a maid in auditions because of the apartheid regime. In an interview with Bona Magazine she said:

White women’s faces used to get painted black if the show needed a black lead. The inequality and oppression angered me, and I started taking part in protest theatre. The police used to interrupt our protest theatre shows with tear gas to intimidate us. Most of the shows were at night and on my way home, the police used to ask for my pass. I was often on the run because the government hated what we were doing."

== Career ==
Nyembe is known for playing Nandi Sibiya from 1 until 2012 on Zone 14. She also portrayed the character of Lily on SABC 1's hit teen-drama Yizo Yizo (2001–2004), and the leading character in the SABC 1 sitcom Izoso Connexion (2006–2007). She has acted in feature films, including Reasonable Man (1999), Saturday Night at the Palace (1987) and Yesterday (2004).

In 2007, she appeared in the drama series Jacob's Cross, playing the role of Thembe Makhubu. In addition, Nyembe has appeared as a guest in episodes of dozens of primetime series including Soul Buddyz, Hillside, Erfsondes, 4Play: Sex Tips for Girls and a guest starring role in The No.1 Ladies' Detective Agency.

=== 2014–2025 ===
In 2006, she also starred in an episode of SABC1 drama series Sticks and Stones, Nyembe has also been a cast member on several television shows, including Mzansi Magic's Isithunzi, Isibaya and The Road for two seasons. In 2016, she was cast in the e.tv drama series Ashes to Ashes. In 2017, Nyembe joined the cast of Mzansi Magic Isithembiso Dolly.

In September 2021, the character she played in the television series House of Zwide was killed off. This led to a string of false reports online that Nyembe had died in real life, and prompted friends to get in touch with her in a panicked state.

== Personal life and death ==
Nyembe had a daughter. Nyembe practiced as a sangoma (Medium/psychic), she had her sangoma initiation when she was only 17. Before knowing she was a sangoma she suffered a serious illness, as a result of being able to connect with the spirits of people who died on the road. In addition she told Time Lives Magazine about the illness.

I was sick and my mother had to take me to Chris Hani Baragwanath Hospital. At some point, doctors had to test my urine and surprisingly it came out with soil but there was nothing wrong with me.

Nyembe's daughter also practiced as a sangoma, though she has stopped.

Nandi Nyembe died on 23 August 2025, at the age of 75. She died without receiving fund that was raised for her.

== Filmography ==
Year	Title	Role	Notes
1987	Saturday Night at the Palace	Miriam	
1994	A Reasonable Man (1999)	Rachel Ndlovu	
2004	Yesterday	Sangoma	

=== Television ===
Year	Title	Role	Episodes	Notes
1994, 1996, 1997, 1999, 2001, 2003	Soul City	Sister Lizzie		
2001–2004	Yizo Yizo	Lily		
2002	Gaz'lam	Lerato's Mother		
2005–2012	Zone 14	Nandi Sibiya		
2006–2007	Izoso Connexion			
2007, 2011–2012	Jacob's Cross	Thembi Makhubu		
2008	Hillside.	Ntshebo Maloka		
2009	The Coconuts	Mrs Hlatshwayo		
2014	Sticks and Stones	Patience		
2011	Soul Buddyz.	Gogo		
2014	Ses'Top La	Guest		
2015–2017	Ashes to Ashes.	Ma' Mazibuko		
2015–2016	The Road	Gogo		
2016–2017	Is'thunzi.	Nolwazi		
2013–2019	Isibaya.	Gog' Mkhithi		

Year	Award	Category	Work	Result
2001	South African Film and Television Awards	Best Supporting Actress – TV Soap/Telenovela	Ashes to Ashes	Nominated
