= Winnie Ntshaba =

South African actress

- Born: Bawinile Ntshaba; 1 September 1975 (age 51); Eshowe, KwaZulu-Natal, South Africa
- Other name: Faith Zwide
- Education: University of Natal
- Occupation: Actress
- Known for: Generations as Khethiwe Buthelezi. "House Of Zwide" as Faith Zwide.
- Spouse: Thabo Modise (m. 2007; div. 2014)
- Children: 1

Bawinile "Winnie" Ntshaba (born 1 September 1975) is a South African actress and businesswoman. She is best known for her role in Generations on SABC 1. She began her career in the 2000s before making her breakthrough in Yesterday.

She is best known for playing Khethiwe Buthelezi on the SABC 1 soap opera Generations. She studied acting at the University of Natal (Durban).

== Early life ==
Ntshaba was born 1 September 1975 in Kwa-Zulu Natal. She has one older sister, who inspired her to further her studies. She attended the University of Natal (Durban), where she obtained her BA Drama Honours degree.

== Film career ==
=== 2000 – 2004 ===
In 2000 she moved to Johannesburg and participated in educational and industrial theater shows for AREPP Shoe String Productions. Then she starred in the 2004 television drama Jozi Streets.

Ntshaba was cast as a support actress in the 2004 film Yesterday with Leleti Khumalo. This was her major film gig, and she received positive reviews for her role. In the same year, Ntshaba was cast in her first leading role in the 2004 film drama Shreds and Dreams directed by Claire Stopford.and later appeared in three productions: Russian Services Lethal Force (supporting role).

=== Generation (2005–2015) ===
In 2013, Ntshaba launched a soapie award ceremony called the Royalty Soapie Awards. The first ceremony took place at the Durban International Convention Centre on 2 November 2013.

In 2005, Ntshaba was Auditioned for the role of Khethiwe Buthelezi on the SABC 1 soap opera Generations (South African TV series), and she has been an integral part of the program ever since, until 2015 when all 16 actors of the show were fired for illegal striking demanding better salaries, after the actors went on strike demanding extension on their contracts and royalties from episodes which had been rebroadcast.

After leaving the soap, in 2017 Ntsaba made appearances on Mzansi magic "The Road", and MTV's Shuga.

=== 2018 ===
In 2018, after a three-year hiatus from the screen, Ntshaba returned on TV, as the lead character on Mzansi Magic hit drama The herd, she played the role of Mam'Ngadi. She has a role on Isithembiso as Mam'Lihle Palesa's mom. In 2021, she was cast as Faith Zwide on an eTV soapy House of Zwide. She plays a dodgy wife to Funani Zwide [played by Vusi Kunene], a designer businessmen.

House of Zwide 2021-present

== Personal life ==
In 2005, Ntshaba began dating SABC Cameraman Thabo Madilola. Ntshaba married Modise in 2006. On 6 July 2009, they welcomed the birth of her son, Phenyo Madilola. In 2013 after 7 years, Ntshaba filed for divorce, that same year the divorce was finalised.

== Filmography ==
Year	Title	Role	Notes
2004	Yesterday (2004 film)	Village Women	

=== Television ===
Year	Title	Role	Episodes	Notes
2004	Jozi Streets	Cynthia		
2005–2014	Generations	Kethiwe Buthelezi		
2015	The Road	Neli		
2015–2019	Isibaya	MEC Zondi		
2018–2020	Isithembiso	Lihle		
2017,2019	MTV Shuga	Neliswe Chauke		
2019–2024	The River	Zodwa Dlomo		
2017–2018	Broken Voews	Funeka		
2018 – 2021	The herd	Mam'Ngadi		
2021 –present	House of Zwide	Faith Zwide		
