= Presley Chweneyagae =

South African actor (1984–2025)

- Born: Presley Oageng Chweneyagae; 19 October 1984; Mafikeng, Bophuthatswana (now North West Province)
- Died: 27 May 2025 (aged 40); Johannesburg, Gauteng, South Africa
- Occupation: Actor
- Years active: 2004 –2025
- Notable work: Tsotsi; The River; Cobrizi

Presley Oageng Chweneyagae (19 October 1984 – 27 May 2025) was a South African actor. He rose to prominence for his starring role in Tsotsi, which won the Academy Award for Foreign Language Film at the 78th Academy Awards.

== Life and career ==
Chweneyagae was named after his mother's favourite singer, Elvis Presley. Following Chweneyagae's debut feature film role in Tsotsi, he continued to work on both stage and screen. His latest films include More Than Just a Game, State of Violence, and Africa United. He also performed in a play about Solomon Mahlangu, a former MK cadre who was hanged at the age of 22.

On 27 May 2025, Chweneyagae died after experiencing breathing problems. He was 40. The government of South Africa and the South African Film and Television Awards (SAFTA) paid tribute to him via social media after his death was announced, with SAFTA calling him a "legend of South African cinema" and the government saying that he was a "gifted storyteller whose talent lit up our screens and hearts".

=== National lottery scandal ===
In 2023, Chweneyagae was implicated in the National Lottery scandal that was investigated by the Special Investigations Unit (SIU). It was reported that over R67.5 million was paid to the Southern African Youth Movement (SAYM) of which he was said to be the ambassador. The money was meant to uplift poor women in Marikana and surrounding areas in the North West province on a chicken farming project. Other stars that were implicated included kwaito singer Arthur Mafokate and actress Terry Pheto. In December 2025, the SIU obtained a preservation order to freeze Chweneyagae's home and assets.

== Selected filmography ==
- Tsotsi (2005)
- iNumber Number (2013)
- Zama Zama (2013)
- The Number (2017)
- The River (2018)
