= Nomalanga Shozi =

South African actor (born 1994)

- Born: Jessica Nomalanga Shozi; 12 July 1994 (age 32); Port Shepstone, KZN
- Other name: The Flame
- Education: Henley Business School Africa
- Occupations: TV and Radio Presenter, Broadcaster, Actress, Model
- Employer(s): Paramount, Gagasi FM, BET Africa
- Known for: The Face Of BET Africa
- Spouse: None
- Partner: None

Jessica Nomalanga Shozi (born 1994) is a South African actor, radio DJ and TV Personality . She appeared on the soap Rhythm City and MTV Shuga Alone Together as well as being a host for BET Africa.

== Life ==
Shozi was born in 1994 and she was brought up in Port Shepstone where she had 12 siblings. She was educated at Marburg Secondary School and Rosebank College. She graduated in Public Relations. She worked as a radio DJ.

Shozi came to notice when she joined the e.tv series Rhythm City. She was the successful candidate chosen from public auditions that attracted 5,000 on-line applications. She was asked to play the eponymous role of Normalanga. A new character whose father is a veteran turned mining magnate.

She went to Las Vegas to cover the backstage and red carpet of the 2018 "BET Soul Train Awards" and in November 2018 it was announced that she would host BET Breaks - a new magazine programme made in, and about Africa. In 2020 she appeared as Mbali on MTV Shuga's Alone Together highlighting the problems of the COVID-19 pandemic. The show was written by Tunde Aladese and Nkiru Njoku. and broadcast for 70 nights - its backers include the United Nations. The series was based in Nigeria, South Africa, Kenya and Côte d'Ivoire and the story will be explained with on-line conversations between the characters. All of the filming will be done by the actors who include Mohau Cele, Lerato Walaza and Jemima Osunde.

As the lockdown was eased in 2020 during the COVID-19 pandemic was eased in South Africa, Shozi's car was involved in a collision. This was just after alcohol was allowed again to be legally sold and Shozi said that the driver was drunk.
