= Lunga Shabalala =

South African actor, TV presenter and model

- Born: 22 May 1989 (age 36); Pietermaritzburg, KwaZulu-Natal, South Africa
- Education: Maritzburg College
- Occupations: Actor; TV presenter TV personality Model
- Years active: 2011 – present

Lunga Shabalala (born 22 May 1989) is a South African actor, TV presenter and model. He rose to fame as a presenter on the SABC 1 entertainment and variety TV show, Selimathunzi. He got his first acting role on the soap opera The River,.

== Early life ==
Lunga was born and raised in Pietermaritzburg. He attended Maritzburg College. While he was at the school, he was classmates with now South African actor, Zenzelisphesihle Xulu and singer Mario Ogle. Upon completing his schooling, he completed a diploma in Town planning. As he later stated, this was not the career for him.

== Career ==
Lunga moved to Johannesburg to work in the television industry. His first job was in a Coca-Cola commercial. In August 2010, he entered a Calvin Klein modeling competition called Represent South Africa. He won the competition, garnering public attention. He then broke into television.

In 2011, he entered the nationwide search for the next presenter of Selimathunzi, a competition launched to replace Kaos Matu, as he had left the show. He won the competition and was chosen as the next Selimathunzi presenter. His celebrity status was confirmed when he was included in the 2011 list of Cosmopolitan sexiest hunks calendar.

In 2013 he appeared in the entertainment countdown show 10 over 10. Later that year he was chosen as a co-presenter on SABC 1's official New Year's Eve show Come Duze. He presented the annual show for 3 years.

In 2014, he was chosen as a co-presenter on the SABC 3 reality TV show, Man Cave alongside Janez Vermeiren. The show presents male contestants competing in male-themed adventurous tasks. He remained as official co-host for all six seasons of the show, ending in 2017.

In February 2015, he appeared on the South African version of Celebrity Masterchef South Africa, inspired by the hit Australian reality TV show of the same name.

In June 2016, he was chosen to co-host the red carpet at 2016 South African Music Awards at the Durban International Convention Centre, alongside Bonang Matheba and Pearl Modiadie.

In 2017, he announced that he would leave his role as co-presenter on Selimathunzi. His last broadcast was on 28 November 2017.

In 2018, he made his debut acting role of Lindani, on M-net original production, The River aired on Dstv's 1Magic channel.

From early 2021 to the show's end in September 2022, he played Sims Zulu on the M-Net original production Legacy.
