= Thembinkosi Mthembu =

South African actor

- Born: Thembinkosi Brian Mthembu; 17 July 1994 (age 31); Kwandengezi, South Africa
- Education: Durban University of Technology
- Occupation: Actor
- Years active: 2017–present
- Notable work: Adulting; The River
- Children: 1

Thembinkosi Brian Mthembu (born 31 July 1994) is a South African actor. He is best known for his roles in the popular serials Shaka Ilembe, The River, The Gamechangers, Kalushi: The Story of Solomon Mahlangu and a short film called Ngeculo.

== Career ==
After completing his diploma, Thembinkosi moved to Johannesburg to pursue his acting career. Upon his arrival in the “City of Gold”, he worked at Checkers and Cell C as a dancer. During this period, he received the minor role of 'Junior' in the television series The Republic. He thereafter appeared in the series The River playing the role of 'Mabutho' in the third season.

In 2019, he played a recurring role as 'Shift Manager' on the MTV Base drama series MTV Shuga Down South 2.

In 2023, he received the opportunity to play a major role on South African Showmax series Shaka Ilembe, Adulting and Outlaws.

In June 2024, Mthembu received a Best Actor nomination by the Simon Mabhunu Sabela Film and Television Awards for his role in Shaka Ilembe. In October 2024 Mthembu won Best Actor at the SAFTAs for his role as King Dingiswayo.

== Early life ==
Thembinkosi was born on 17 July 1994 in the township of KwaNdengezi, Durban, South Africa. In 2017, he obtained a diploma in Drama and Production from the Durban University of Technology.

== Filmography ==
Year	Film	Role	Genre.
2019	The Republic	Junior	TV series
2019	MTV Shuga Down South 2	Shift Manager	TV series
2020	Ngeculo	Malusi	TV short film
2020–2023	The River	Mabutho	TV series
2023–2025	Adulting	Bonga Tembe	TV series
2023-2025	Shaka Ilembe	King Dingiswayo	Drama series
2023	Outlaws	Bandile Biyela	Drama series
2024-2025	Champions	Sbusiso Ferari	Telenovela
2025–present	HomeComing	Sifiso Kubheka	Telenovela
2026-present	The Four Of Us	Banzi Dhlomo	Telenovela

== Achievements ==
=== Simon Mabhunu Sabela KZN Film and TV Awards ===
Year	Nominee / work	Award	Result	Ref.
2024	Himself	Best Actor TV	Won	

=== South African Film and Television Awards ===
Year	Nominee / work	Award	Result	Ref.
2024	Himself	Best Supporting Actor in a Telenovela	Nominated	
2024	Himself	Best Actor in a TV Drama	Won	
