= Hlomla Dandala =

South African actor, television presenter and director

- Born: 22 September 1974 (age 52) mount ayliff, Eastern Cape, South Africa
- Education: Sacred Heart College, Johannesburg; University of the Witwatersrand
- Occupations: actor; television presenter; director
- Years active: 1995-present
- Known for: Isidingo; Jacob’s Cross; All You Need Is Love
- Spouses: Candy Litchfield (m. 2001; div. 2009): Brenda Dandala
- Children: 4
- Parent: Mvume Dandala (father)
- Relatives: Gqibelo Dandala

Hlomla Dandala (born 22 September 1974) is a South African actor, television presenter, and director.

He is best known for his roles as Derek Nyathi in Isidingo (1998–2001), title character Jacob Makhubu in Jacob's Cross (since 2007), and host of the reality dating show All You Need Is Love from 2002 to 2003. He starred in the drama series Rockville as Gomorrah, the main antagonist of the third season, and e.tv's prime time soap opera, Scandal! as Kingsley Siseko Langa from 2016 until 2019.

As of 2018, Dandala stars in The River across Sindi Dlathu (who plays Lindiwe) as her husband, Commissioner Zweli Dikana. Dandala is the son of Mvume Dandala and has a sister Gqibelo. He speaks five languages: Afrikaans, English, Xhosa, Sesotho and Zulu.

== Filmography ==
Television series
Year	Title	Role	Season	Notes
1998 - 2001	Isidingo	Derek Nyathi	1 - 4	Lead role
2002 - 2004	Scout's Safari	Charlton 'C.B.' Boone		
2005	Gaz'lam	Coltrane	3 - 4	
2005 - 2022	Scandal!	Kingsley Siseko Langa	2014 - 2022	
2006	Tsha Tsha	Lungi	4	
2006 - 2007	Jozi-H	Dr. Sipho Remthalile		
2007	Jacob's Cross	Jacob Makhubu/Abayomi	1 - 7	Lead role
	Rockville	Gomorrah	3	
	Zero Tolerance	Majola Tindleni	2	
2018 - 2024	The River	Zweli Dikana	1 - 6	Lead role
2019	The Republic	Deputy President Cassius Ndlovu	1	
	Interrogation Room			
2022	Justice Served	Azania Maqoma		
2023	Yoh! Christmas			Supporting role
2024 - ongoing	Smoke & Mirrors (TV series)	Ceasar Ngonyama	2	Lead role

Programming
Year	Title	Notes
1995 - 1998	Channel O	
2002 - 2003	All you need is love	Host

Mini series
Year	Title	Role	Notes
2008	Land of Thirst	Khanyiso Phalo	
2005	The Triangle		
2017	Madiba		

=== Film ===
- Fools (1997) as Zani Vuthela
- Red Dust (2004) as Oscar Dumasi
- Lord of War (2005) as Interpol Pilot
- Coup! (made for TV, 2006) as Ngum
- Eternity (2010) as Joe Kau
- Sniper Reloaded (2011) as Kyle Brown
- Winnie (2011) as Oliver Tambo
- Contract (2014) as Peter Poplampo - with Yvonne Okoro and Joseph Benjamin.
- Honeymoon Hotel (2014) with Beverly Naza and Martha Ankhoma.
- Momentum (2015) as Mr. Madison
- Happiness Is a Four Letter Word (2016) with Chris Attoh
- Phoenix Wilder and the Great Elephant Adventure (2017) as Col. Ibori
