= Lunga Mofokeng =

South African actor and media personality (born 1996)

- Born: Lunga Mofokeng; 12 July 1996 (age 30); Katlehong, Gauteng, South Africa
- Other name: Luchy
- Education: CityVarsity
- Occupations: Actor; media personality
- Years active: 2017–present
- Notable work: The River; Skeem Saam

Lunga Mofokeng (born 12 July 1996) is a South African actor and media personality. He is best known for his roles as Andile Dikana in The River (2018–2024) and Qhomani Tlail (commonly referred as Mr Q) in Skeem Saam (2026–present).

== Early life ==
Mofokeng was born on 7 September 1996, in Katlehong, Gauteng, South Africa. He was raised by his mother while his father passed on when he was young. He attended the CityVarsity where he holds Diploma in Professional Acting.

== Career ==
Mofokeng began his career in grade 10 and he made his first television appearance playing the cameo role as Thando's nephew in Ring of Lies season 2. In 2018, he played a starring role in a telenovela in The River as Andile Dikana. His portrayal of Andile has gained a significant attention and praise for bringing awareness to the LGBTQ+ community. In 2023, he received his nominations from Royalty Soapie Awards for Outstanding Supporting Actor for his role in The River. In February 2026, he is currently playing the main role in SABC 1 soapie opera Skeem Saam as Que.

== Filmography ==
=== Film ===
Year	Title	Role	Notes
2022	Ngisak'khumbula	Suzwe	Main role, short movie

=== Television ===
Year	Title	Role	Notes
2017	Ring of Lies	Thando's nephew	Recurring role, season 2
2018–2024	The River	Andile Dikana	Main role, season 1–7
2026–present	Skeem Saam	Mr Q	Main role

== Awards and nominations ==
Year	Association	Category	Nominated works	Result	Ref.
2023	Royalty Soapie Awards	Outstanding Supporting Actor	As Andile Dikana on The River	Nominated	
