= Sindi Dlathu =

South African actress and singer

- Born: Sindi Dlathu; 9 January 1974 (age 52); Meadowlands, Gauteng, South Africa
- Other names: Kalashshnikov; Madlabantu
- Citizenship: South African
- Occupations: Actress; singer; co-executive producer
- Years active: 1988-present
- Known for: Lindiwe Dlamini on, The River
- Notable work: Muvhango, The River
- Children: 1
- Relatives: Tina Dlathu (sister)
- Awards: SAFTA Award for Best Actress in telenovela 2X DStv MVC Award for Best Actress in telenovela 2019 Royalty Soapie Award for Best Actress in telenovela 2019 Royalty Soapie Award for Best Female Villain 2020

Sindiswa Dlathu (born 9 January 1974) is a South African actress and musician. She is well known for portraying ThandazaMokoena on Muvhango, a role she played from the show's inception in 1997 until her departure in 2017.

Dlathu left Muvhango to play a leading role in the telenovela The River, where she played the role of Lindiwe Dlamini-Dikana, a fierce woman who would do anything to protect her wealth and maintain her lavish lifestyle.

== Career ==
Dlathu was cast as the lead role's understudy in the stage version of Sarafina!. In the screen version, she worked alongside Whoopi Goldberg and was commissioned as an assistant choreographer to Michael Peters. In 1988, with the second cast led by Seipati Sothoane whom Sindi understudied. When the play went on tour, she stayed behind and did Township fever in 1989–1990 touring the US with the play for a year.

Dlathu then returned to school after four years of being with Mbongeni Ngema's committed artists. She completed her matric in 1996, and then went back to performing arts and stage plays in 1997. She was in the FNB Vita Award-winning Game, where she performed with Mary Twala, Abigail Kubeka, and the late Nomhle Nkonyeni.

She won the award for favourite actress at the 2020 DStv Mzansi Viewers' Choice Awards.

Dlathu, as Lindiwe Dlamini-Dikana from The River, appeared in a crossover episode of The Queen as the friend of the lead female character, Harriet Khoza - Sebata.

In 2021, she won SAFTA award in Best Actress category for her role of Lindiwe in The River.

== Filmography ==
Film

Year	Film	Role
1992	Sarafina! (film)	Dancer

Television

Year	Television	Role	Notes
1997 –2017	Muvhango	Nomthandazo Mokoena	Main
2001 – 2008	Soul City	Nomfundo Molefe	Main
2015	Ngempela		Main
2017	The Game	MaZet	Recurring
2018 – 2024	The River	Lindiwe Dlamini-Zwane	Main
2018	The Queen	Lindiwe Dlamini-Zwane	Recurring
2022	The Republic	Lindiwe Dlamini-Zwane	Recurring
2024–present	Queendom	Tholakele Magagula	Main
2024 - 2025	Isiphetho - Destiny	Zanemvula	Main
2025	Unseen	Politician	Main
2026	The Four Of Us	Busani Dhlomo	Main

Theatre

Year	Drama/Play/Theatre Showcase	Role	Notes
1999	Township Fever	Nosisa	Theatre Debut
2002	Cry; The Beloved The Country	Mrs Khumalo	Soweto Theatre
2004	Married	Felicia Nyathi	Joburg Theatre

== Awards and nominations ==
=== Royalty Sopie Awards ===
Year	Nominee / work	Award	Result	Ref.
2023		Outstanding On—Screen Couple	Won	
2023	Herself	Viewer’s Choice: Best Actress	Nominated	
2023	Herself as Lindiwe Dlamini	Outstanding Lead Actress	Nominated	
2024	The River As Lindiwe Dikana	Outstanding Female Villain	Won	
2024	The River As Lindiwe Dikana	Outstanding Lead Actress	Nominated	

=== South Africa Film and Television Awards ===
Year	Nominee / work	Award	Result	Ref.
2024	The River as Lindiwe Dikana	Best Actress in Telenovela	Nominated	
