= 1Magic =

South African digital satellite TV channel

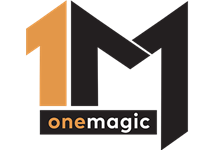
- Country: South Africa
- Broadcast area: Sub-Saharan Africa
- Affiliates: M-Net City, Vuzu
- Headquarters: Johannesburg

Programming
- Languages: English; Setswana (local programming only; mostly from Mzansi Magic); IsiZulu (local programming only; mostly from Mzansi Magic); IsiXhosa (local programming only; mostly from Mzansi Magic)
- Picture format: 1080i HDTV (downscaled to 16:9 576i for the SDTV feed)

Ownership
- Owner: MultiChoice
- Sister channels: M-Net; SuperSport; Channel O Mzansi Magic; KykNET; Africa Magic; Maisha Magic; Zambezi Magic; Pearl Magic; 1Max

History
- Launched: 18 September 1998; 28 years ago (as M-Net Series); 9 July 2013; 13 years ago (as M-Net Series Reality); 29 January 2018; 8 years ago (as 1Magic)
- Closed: 31 March 2024; 2 years ago
- Former names: The Series Channel (1998–2005); M-Net Series (2005–2013); M-Net Series Reality (2013–2014); VUZU Amp (2014–2018)

Links
- Website: Channel website

Availability

Terrestrial
- DStv: Channel 103 (HD)

1Magic (also known as One Magic) was a subscription-based digital satellite television general entertainment channel created by M-Net and MultiChoice for DStv. It is one of the resultant channels from the M-Net series channel created in 1998.

== History ==
The channel was launched in 18 September 1998, as The Series Channel (later renamed to M-Net Series in August 2005), as a sister channel to the original M-Net channel. On 9 July 2013, this channel was split into three, namely M-Net Series Showcase, which was the premium series channel which had new series releases, M-Net Series Reality broadcast talk shows and other reality media and M-Net Series Zone which served as a rerun channel, and featured previous seasons of shows and back-to-back marathon blocks. On 11 September 2014, it was announced that Series Showcase and Series Reality would be replaced with two new channels, VUZU Amp, the premium version of VUZU and M-Net Edge, a primetime channel providing a stronger offering than M-Net, on 20 and 13 October, respectively. M-Net Series Zone was later renamed M-Net City in 2016.

On 31 March 2017, M-Net Edge was absorbed by M-Net to create a supersized channel.

On 29 January 2018, VUZU Amp was rebranded to 1Magic.There is a sister channel called 1max that is still broadcasting to this day.

As of 1 February 2021, The West African feed was launched and it moved to channel 119, but it remained on channel 103 for the Rest of Africa.

The channel ceased operations on 31 March 2024, along with Me.

== Programming ==
1Magic has a more local approach, creating its own premium first-run content with an amalgam of international content. The channel is considered to be a premium version of Mzansi Magic, while still following their Express From The U.S brand from its predecessor VUZU Amp. The channel boasts of local productions like The River, Being Bonang, Living The Dream With Somizi, Please Step In, Grassroots and V Entertainment, with new seasons of Black-ish, Grown-ish, How To Get Away with Murder, Queen Sugar and The Fixer, Power (TV series) and Unmarried season 3 to name a few.
