= Mmabatho (given name) =

Mmabatho is a given name.

== People with the given name ==
- Mmabatho Mogomotsi, South African actress
- Mmabatho Mokause, South African politician
- Mmabatho Mokoena-Zondi (fl. from 2026), South African politician
- Mmabatho Montsho (born 1983), South African artist
- Mmabatho Ramagoshi, South African government official
- Mmabatho Tembe, South African politician

== See also ==
- Mmabatho
