= Relebogile =

Sotho-Tswana name

- Gender: Unisex
- Language: Sotho–Tswana languages

Origin
- Meaning: Thank you

Other names
- Nicknames: Lebo, Rele, Relo
- Related names: Siyabonga/Sibongile (Nguni versions)

Relebogile/Relebohile is a Sotho-Tswana name meaning "thank you." Notable people with the name include:

- Relebogile Mabotja (born 1985), South African actress and radio host
- Relebohile Mofokeng (born 2004), South African soccer player
- Relebogile Mokhuoane (born 1994), South African soccer player
