= Mpondoland (TV series) =

South African drama television series

- Genre: Friction; cultural drama
- Created by: Chumisa Cosa
- Written by: Chumisa Cosa; Mmamitse Thibedi; Thembakuye Madlala; Thulani Sundu; Thulani Cekiso; Shitshembiso Mabasa
- Directed by: Nthabi Tau; Nthabiseng Mokoena
- Starring: Thembekile Komani; Tina Jaxa; Siphiwe Maqubela; Luzuko Nkqeto; Anele Matoti; Khojane Morai; Ayanda Makayi
- Country of origin: South Africa
- Original language: IsiMpondo
- No. of seasons: 1
- No. of episodes: 13

Production
- Executive producers: Chumisa Cosa; Mammals Thibedi
- Producer: Origins Pictures
- Camera setup: Multi-camera
- Running time: 50–54 minutes

Original release
- Network: Mzansi Magic
- Release: 7 December 2025 – 1 March 2026

Mpondoland is a South African television drama created by Chumisa Cosa and produced by Origins Pictures that premiered on Mzansi Magic on 7 December 2025. The series explores the conflict between ancestral tradition and corporate greed in the Eastern Cape. It stars Thembekile Komani and Tina Jaxa, and is celebrated for its authentic use of the isiMpondo language.

== Premise ==
Mpondoland is set in the fictional village of KwaKhonjwayo in the Eastern Cape, it follows Mkhondwana played by Thembekile Komani, a man torn between his modern life and his destiny as the reluctant heir to his village's leadership. The story intensifies when a ruthless pharmaceutical syndicate, led by the cold blooded Pele Pele played by Tina Jaxa. As Mkhondwana rises to protect his heritage, the series explores the high stakes battle between ancestral tradition and corporate greed by highlighting the resilience of the Mpondo people.

== Cast ==
=== Lead cast ===
- Thembekile Komani as Mkhondwana
- Tina Jaxa as Pele Pele
- Siziphiwe Maqubela as Noma
- Luzuko Nkqeto as Mzwakali
- Anele Matoti as Mahamba
- Khojane Morai as Dalindyebo
- Ayanda Makayi as Scelo

=== Supporting cast ===
- Robert Mpisi as Sithembiso
- Mlamli Mangcala as Mthethutsho
- Mbasa Msongelo as Onombhola
- Momelezi Ntshiba as Wushe

=== Recurring cast ===
- Nkosinathi Emmanuel Gweva
- Esihle Ndleleni
- Dobs Madotyeni
- Ntando Peter

== Production ==
Mpondoland was created by Chumisa Cosa, and was a executive producer alongside Mmamitse Thibedi. The series was produced in South Africa, with principal photography taking place in Mpondoland. The production incorporated the use of Xhosa language and involved consultation with local communities to support cultural representation. The series features a predominantly South African cast and crew include Tina Jaxa and Thembekile Komani contributing to the development and promotion of local television content.

== Release ==
The series premiered on Mzansi Magic from 7 December 2025 to 1 March 2026, airing only on Sundays at 20:00 for one hour.
