= Sylvia Arthur =

Ghanaian writer and founder of Library Of Africa and The African Diaspora

- Born: London, England
- Education: University of Westminster; City University, London
- Occupations: Writer, journalist, communications consultant, literary curator and cultural activist
- Known for: Founding director of Library Of Africa and The African Diaspora (LOATAD)
- Website: sylvia-arthur.com

Sylvia Arthur, born in London, England, to Ghanaian parents, is a writer, journalist, communications consultant, literary curator and cultural activist. In 2017, she founded a private library in Accra, Ghana, the Library Of Africa and The African Diaspora (LOATAD), for the study, preservation, and dissemination of African and Diaspora literature, with a mission "to celebrate and champion Africa's rarely acknowledged contribution to the global literary canon." LOATAD also runs a programme of writers' residences, Arthur herself having had residences with Hedgebrook in Washington State and the Santa Fe Art Institute in New Mexico, among other places.

Arthur explores in her work issues of identity, diaspora and place, with publications and outlets for which she has written including The Guardian, Lithub, the BBC, and the British Journalism Review. She is author of the 2015 book Get Hired: Recession-Proof Strategies for Finding a Job Now. Since 2022, she has been a National Geographic Explorer, whose ongoing research is an oral history project to document the life stories of African women aged 60 and above,

Arthur was named the 2023 Brittle Paper African Literary Person of the Year.

== Biography ==
Sylvia Arthur was born to Ghanaian parents in London, England, where she grew up. She graduated with a Postgraduate Diploma in Journalism from the University of Westminster, and holds an MA in Narrative Nonfiction Writing from City University, London. After working as a runner for Sky News, she became a reporter at News Africa magazine, and she has freelanced for The Guardian, the BBC and the British Journalism Review, in addition to starting the listings outlet What's On Ghana in 2005. She has also worked as an assistant producer for the BBC, ITV and Sky.

In 2010, she moved from London to work in Brussels, Belgium, for two years; she was employed by a communications agency, as a consultant to the European Commission's Directorate General for Employment. As she later wrote: "Finding myself alone in an unfamiliar city, I retreated further into the world of letters, writing and reading to stave off the isolation. I'd buy books weekly from one cavernous secondhand bookstore, but these were no ordinary castoffs, they were special; well-cared-for with barely cracked spines by writers from around the world. It was as if their previous owners had, with great foresight, bequeathed them to me, and me alone, after they'd left this transient place, donating them as one would an organ. They gave me life. They literally held me when I needed uplift from the casual racism I faced." Most of the books were by writers of colour, and when the quantity she had amassed became more than her living space could accommodate, she would ship them by container to Ghana, where she paid regular visits to family.

== Library Of Africa and The African Diaspora ==
Eventually deciding to relocate completely to Ghana in 2017, she very soon initiated what was originally known as Libreria Ghana, using 1,300 of her own books that had been in storage since 2011 at her mother's house. For a small subscription, visitors to the library could read and borrow books. Libreria Ghana became known as the Library Of Africa and The African Diaspora (LOATAD), as a statement announced on 20 May 2020: "We decided to change our name to reflect who we are, what we do, and what we stand for. We are a decolonised library with a focus on books by writers from Africa and the African Diaspora. We have books from almost all African countries, and across the Diaspora."

Since 2022, LOATAD has also hosted a residency programme enabling writers from West African countries to make use of the library's resources while working on a longform writing project. Having herself benefited from residences, such as Hedgebrook in Washington State and the Santa Fe Art Institute in New Mexico, Arthur observes: "By allowing African writers to be in an environment where they are surrounded by the work of their literary forebears, you immediately change their perspective. By reflecting the breadth and depth of Black writing over the centuries we’re showing writers and potential writers in a very empirical way that they are part of a lineage."

== Recognition and awards ==
Speaking engagements Arthur has undertaken include two TEDx Talks, most recently in 2022 at Ashesi University. She was chosen as an Africa No Filter "Narrative Champion" and is the recipient of a "Cultures of Resistance Award".

Arthur is a 2022 National Geographic Explorer, supported by a grant from the National Geographic Society for her ongoing research towards "A Women's Oral History of West Africa, which is documenting the life stories of West African women aged over 60 towards the creation of "an expansive oral archive".

In 2023, she was honoured "for her outstanding work as the founder of the Library of Africa and The African Diaspora (LOATAD)" when she was named the Brittle Paper African Literary Person of the Year (previous recipients including Ellah Wakatama, Kwame Dawes and Lola Shoneyin). In support of the award, Nii Ayikwei Parkes said: "What Sylvia has achieved in six years...is nothing short of extraordinary. Apart from the thousands of readers who get access to book by writers of Africa and its diaspora, more than 50 creatives have benefitted from the library as fellows and residents, creating groundbreaking work and forming enduring networks which will produce their own cultural treasures."
