= Raica Oliveira =

Brazilian model

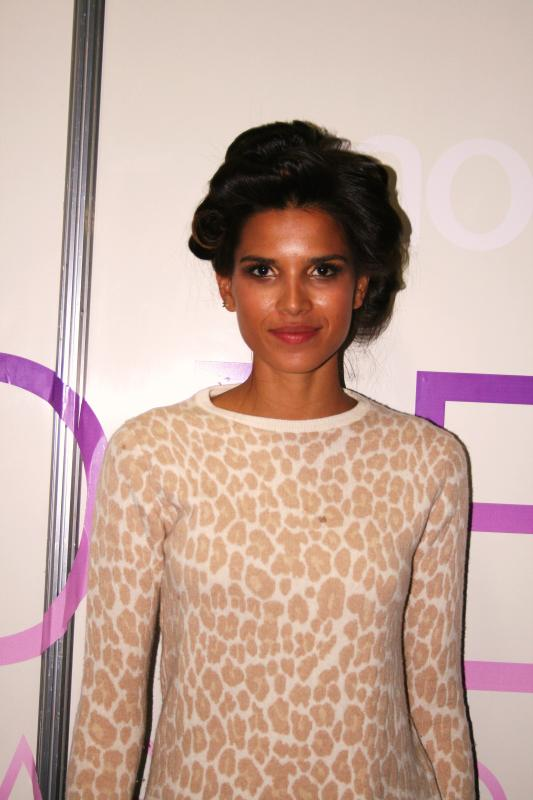
- Born: 22 January 1984 (age 42); Niterói, Rio de Janeiro, Brazil
- Modeling information
- Height: 1.80 m (5 ft 11 in)
- Hair color: Dark Brown
- Eye color: Brown
- Agency: One Management (New York); Oui Management (Paris); Why Not Model Management (Milan); Next Model Management (London); Uno Models (Barcelona); Model Management (Hamburg); Munich Models (Munich); MIKAs (Stockholm)

Raica Oliveira (born 22 January 1984) is a Brazilian model who has worked for Emanuel Ungaro, Dior, Dolce & Gabbana, Yves Saint Laurent, Vogue, Chanel, Lancôme, Victoria's Secret, Pepe Jeans, Sports Illustrated Swimsuit Issue, JLO, H&M, Elle, Marie Claire, TNG, Ann Taylor and XOXO.

== Early life ==
Oliveira was born in Niterói, Brazil, the youngest of three children. She has two brothers: Givago (an economist) and Pablo (a lawyer). She graduated from the Sao Vicente de Paula school in Niteroi.

Before becoming a model, she practiced bodyboarding. She dreamed of becoming a model since she was ten years old. Oliveira was discovered by the same agent who discovered Gisele Bündchen, Sergio Mattos.

In 1999, Oliveira entered the Elite Model Look contest in Brazil and beat 30,000 girls for the top prize. She was sent to Nice, France, for the final international competition, where she placed second. Soon thereafter, she moved to New York with her mother Conceição de Oliveira to try to build her career.

== Career ==
Raica Oliveira was christened "The Sensation" at the 1999 fall fashion shows in Paris and Milan. She was one of the most talked about models of the season alongside Adriana Lima, Maggie Rizer, Oluchi and Karen Elson. Her first campaign was for Christian Dior, shot by photographer Nick Knight; it appeared in the likes of Vogue and Vanity Fair. In May 2000 Oliveira was one of the models to appear in the Vogue USA edition' segment Blame It On Rio, the photographer was Mario Testino and also featured models like Gisele Bündchen and Fernanda Tavares. Becoming one of Brazil's most searched top models led her to be ranked in 2001 by the magazine Istoe Gente to be one of the best paid Brazilian models, earning US$300,000 for her work, which included walking in more than 76 fashion shows in only two seasons.

The 2002 calendar celebrating the Vespa, shot by Peter Beard, featured Oliveira, along with Nourchene Scherif and Mia Rosing. Oliveira also posed for the Pirelli Calendar in 2005. The same year Jennifer Lopez decided to make her own clothing line and Oliveira was chosen to appear on the ads as the head face for the fall/ winter collection.

In addition to her campaigns and ads for Dolce & Gabbana, Yves Saint Laurent, and La Perla, Oliveira became spokesmodel for the cosmetics company Lancôme in 2006 and fashion laicence Punto Blanco. She then replaced model Naomi Campbell at the Selmark Underwear Collection 2006 fashion show. She has also modeled swimwear for Victoria's Secret.

In February 2007 she appeared in Sports Illustrated. In March 2007 Oliveira joined IMG Paris and she also appeared in Ann Taylor advertisements. In September 2007, she appeared in Bandolino ads which was featured in Vogue and InStyle. She also became the new face of Avon Oliveira is also a representative for David Morris London jewelry. Oliveira was one of the supermodels who appeared in the Blame It On Brazil edition of Vanity Fair in September 2007, photographed by Mario Testino.

Photographer Gabriel Mendes' work, "Urban Puns - Trocadilhos Urbanos", which consists of urban portraits, mostly everyday-people shot in front of street-art murals, that were shot in Rio de Janeiro, São Paulo and New York, where Mendes resides, has Oliveira posing for the photographer as the subject on one of the twelve photos that make his visual diary. The photo was taken in New York in front of a street graffiti in 2007.

She is featured in the Sports Illustrated 2007 Calendar and appeared at the Sports Illustrated 2007 Sportsman of the Year Awards on 4 December 2007. In February 2008, she appeared in a GQ editorial for United Kingdom. Oliveira landed a contract with the fashion brand XOXO for the year 2008. The new XOXO campaign features both Oliveira's face and name in their brand, revealing Oliveira as one of their spokesmodels. She is currently with Next Models (London, New York, Milan and Miami), Elite Models, Munchen Models, and more.

São Paulo Fashion Week released a calendar featuring 25 Brazilian models including Oliveira, photographed by Bob Wolfenson with art direction by Giovanni Bianco. The calendar was accompanied by a movie containing interviews with the models, which was broadcast at GNT in Brazil and then hit the shelves as a DVD.

In April 2008, Oliveira was featured in a campaign for fashion brand H&M in the Caribbean and in the United States.

Oliveira is against posing nude: "I could not pose nude. Nothing against those who do, but I never felt right about it. It's not something that would make me proud."

She graced the May 2008 cover of Spain's YO DONA magazine. Oliveira appeared at the Cannes Film Festival in 2008. In Cannes, she was photographed for the French Vogue.

She took part in the São Paulo Fashion Week with Michelle Alves, Isabeli Fontana and Caroline Ribeiro on the Rosa Chá male fashion show spring/summer 2008/2009 in June.

Oliveira, Daniela Cicarelli and Deborah Secco are the faces of the Brazilian footwear brand Via Marte for the Spring/Summer collection 2008/2009 and Oliveira is also the spokesmodel for Lez a Lez, Banco de Areia and Pain de Sucre (France) for spring/summer 2009.

The fashion week in São Paulo (SPFW) for the summer season 2010 featured Oliveira walking on the fashion shows of Agua de Coco. O Estilo and Cia Maritima which are two of Brazilian best known fashion brands.

Oliveira is modeling lingerie for Victoria's Secret. She is featured in the brands new campaign in 2009. This is the second time Oliveira is advertising Victoria's Secret since 2005 when she appeared in their swimwear catalogue.

Oliveira is the first Brazilian model ever to appear in a Swarovski campaign. She is the face of the Ginga Collection which hits the stores in April 2010.

Since the year 2000 Oliveira has appeared in more than 6 Vogue editions such as Vogue USA, Vogue Australia, Vogue Spain, Vogue Italy, Vogue Brazil, Vogue Paris.

In November 2010 Oliveira became the new face of lingerie brand Ultimo replacing Kelly Brook. However, while Oliveira is happy to pose in her underwear for the new campaign, she has drawn the line at ever posing nude.

== Reporter for Jornal Record ==
Since 2008, Oliveira has been working as a reporter in Paris and New York for the Portuguese Jornal Record. Oliveira will be reporting on fashion occasions occurring in Paris and New York for the program Hoje em Dia which is hosted by fellow model Ana Hickmann.

She was going to be the presenter of Fórum Desenvolvimento Sustentável 2008 but was unable to do so because of her modeling work.

== Personal life ==
Oliveira is a vegetarian and she has stated she has been one her whole life and does not feel the urge to eat animal meat.

== Charity work ==
Oliveira is a part of the Arte Solidaria foundation. Oliveira is pledged in beneficent causes. Her photograph is in a book in calendar format that the Hope House has launched in 2008. Her income from this is slated for an institution that helps children with cancer.
