= Sibongile =

Sibongile (Siyabonga male) is a feminine given name derived from the Nguni word bonga, meaning "to thank". Notable people with the name include:

- Sibongile Besani, South African politician
- Sibongile Khumalo (1957–2021), South African singer
- Sibongile Mchunu, South African politician
- Sibongile Mlambo, Zimbabwean actress
- Sibongile Ndashe, South African lawyer and human rights activist
- Sibongile Judith Nkomo, South African politician
- Sibongile Novuka (born 1998), South African rugby player
- Sibongile Ntoane (born 2003), South African soccer player
- Sibongile Sambo (born 1974), South African airline executive
