= University of the Western Cape =

Public university in Bellville, Cape Town, South Africa

Coordinates: 33°56′S 18°38′E

- Other names: Bush, uDubs
- Motto: Latin: Respice Prospice
- Motto in English: "Look Ahead"
- Type: Public university
- Established: 1959; 67 years ago
- Academic affiliations: ACU, CHEC, HESA, IAU
- Chancellor: Thabo Makgoba
- Vice-Chancellor: Robert Balfour
- Rector: Robert Balfour
- Students: 23,000+ (2023)
- Undergraduates: 15,840
- Postgraduates: 6,160
- Location: Robert Sobukwe Road, Bellville, Western Cape, South Africa
- Campus: Urban setting
- Mascot: Cara the Caracal
- Website: www.uwc.ac.za

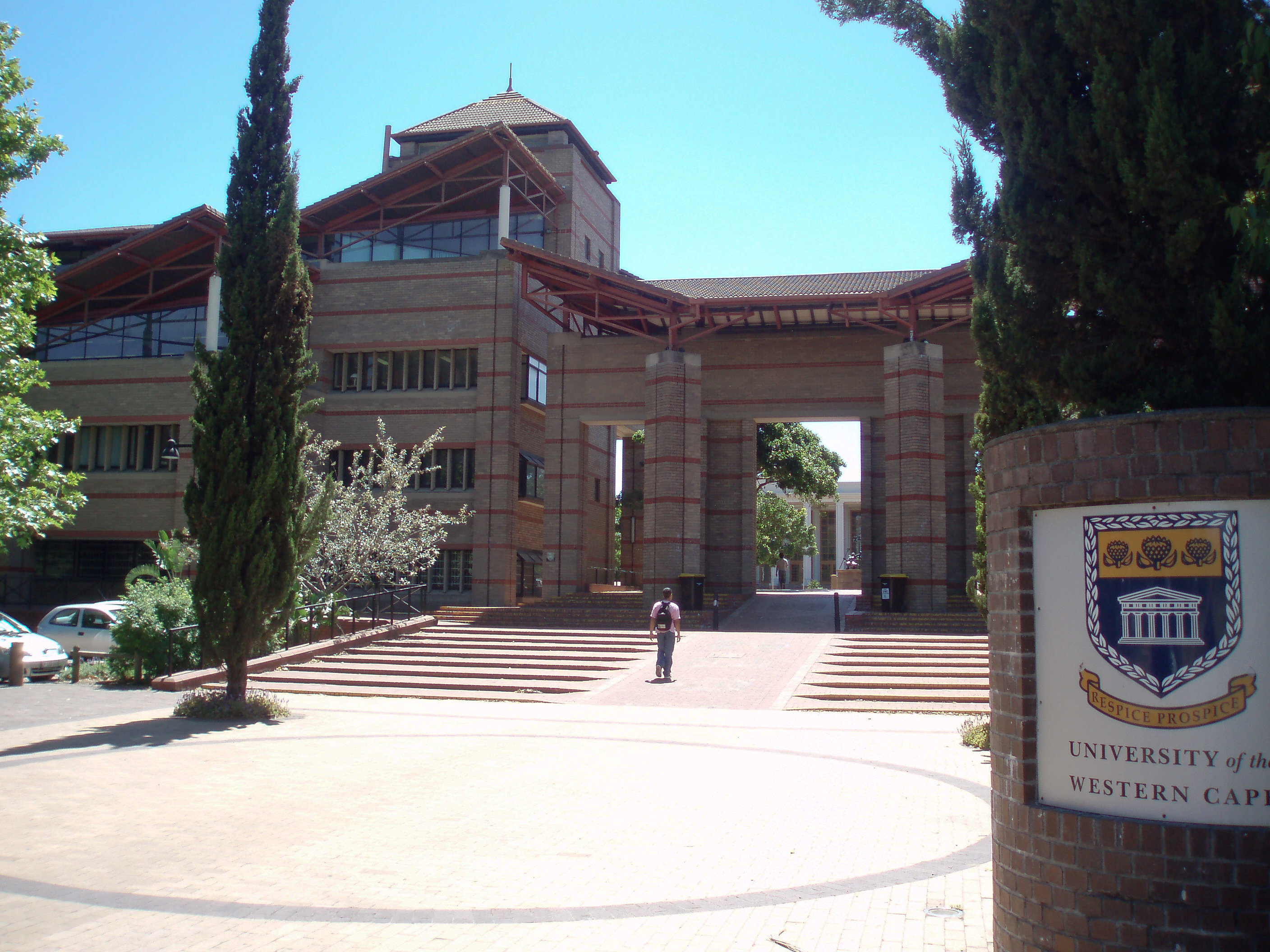
Entry to Central campus from the west

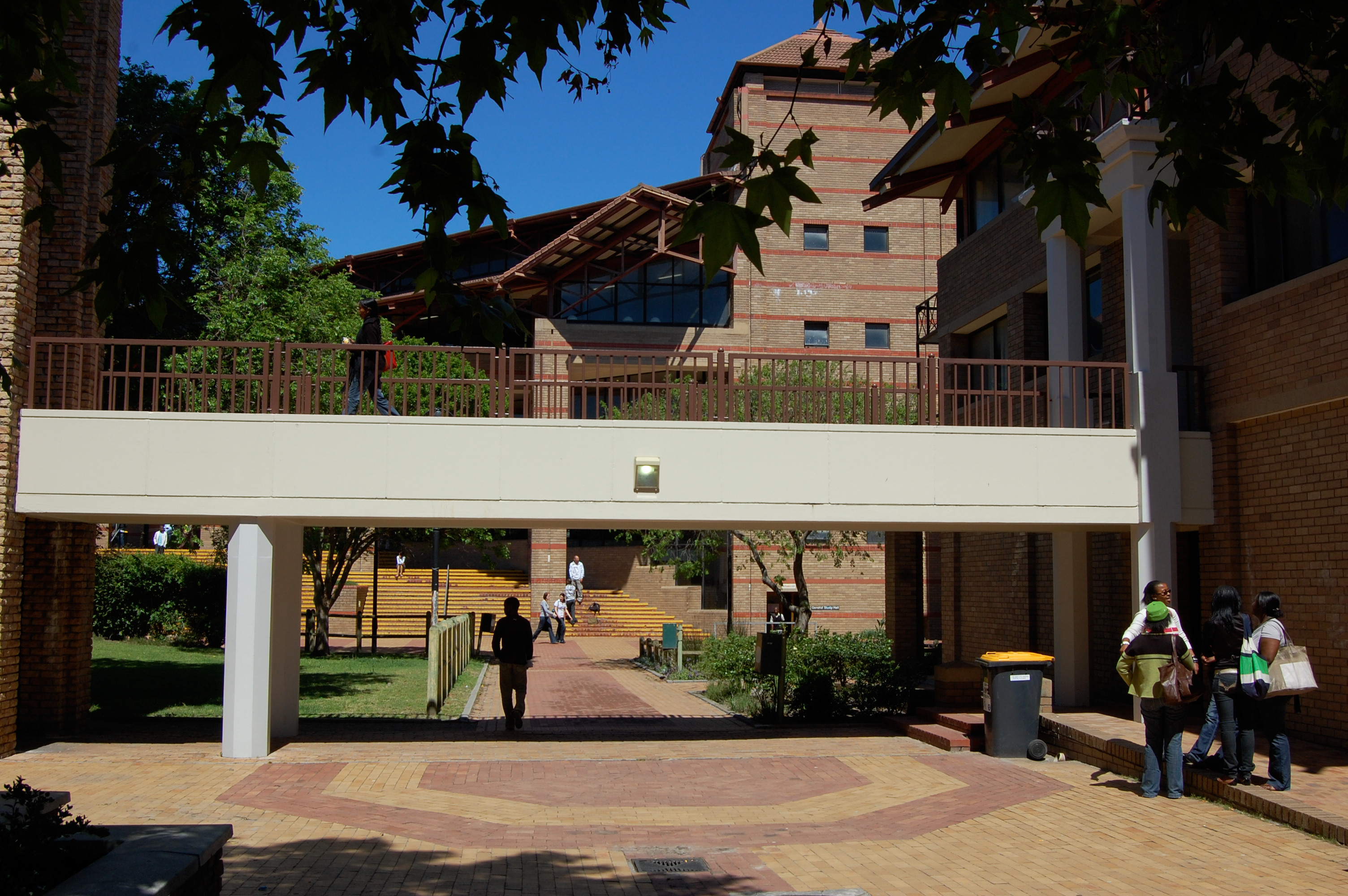
View towards the main library

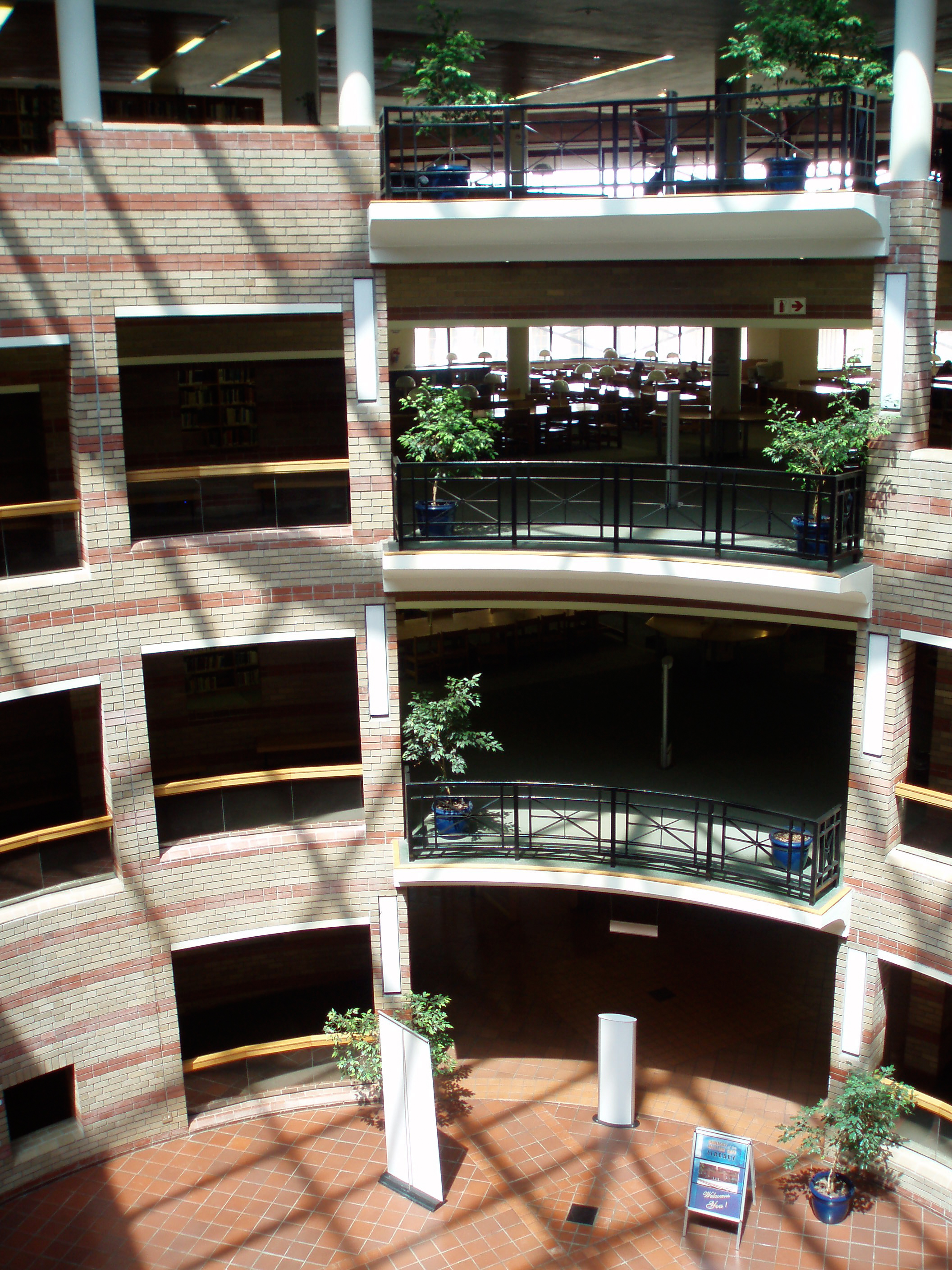
Circular interior of the main library

The University of the Western Cape (UWC; Afrikaans: Universiteit van Wes-Kaapland) is a public research university in Bellville, near Cape Town, South Africa. The university was established in 1959 by the South African apartheid government as a university exclusively for the Coloured population. Other universities in Cape Town are the University of Cape Town (originally for English-speaking whites), Cape Peninsula University of Technology, and Stellenbosch University (originally for Afrikaans-speaking whites). The establishing of UWC was a direct effect of the Apartheid-era Extension of University Education Act, 1959. This law accomplished the segregation of higher education in South Africa. Coloured students were only allowed at a few non-white universities. In this period, other "ethnical" universities, such as the University of Zululand and the University of the North, were founded as well. Since well before the end of apartheid in South Africa in 1994, it has been an integrated and multiracial institution.

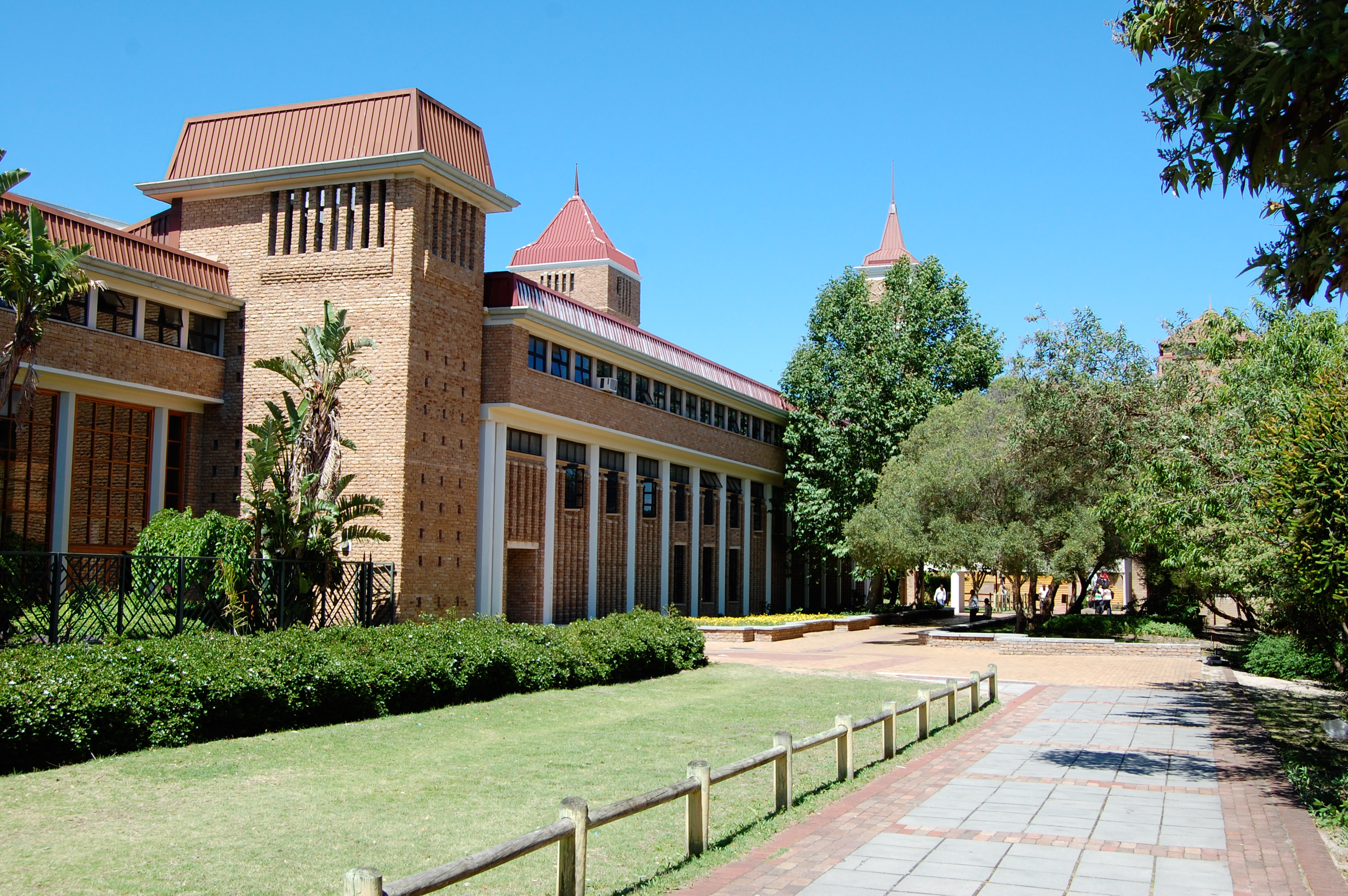
The University of the Western Cape Great Hall.

== History ==
=== Early days ===
UWC started as a "bush college", a university college without autonomy under the auspices of the University of South Africa and was known as the University College of the Western Cape. It started as a small institution, admitting only 166 students with 17 staff members in its first year. The university offered limited training for lower-to-middle-level positions in schools and the civil service. In the first years of its existence, a great deal of the teaching staff was white, many of whom came from Stellenbosch University. The language in most lectures was Afrikaans. The first rector, J.G. Meiring, served from 1960 to 1 January 1966. In 1970, the institution gained university status and was able to award its own degrees and diplomas. It was known as the University of the Western Cape from 1 January 1970 onwards.

== Chancellors ==
Desmond Tutu - 1987 to 2012

Thabo Makgoba - 2012 to present

== Rectors and Vice Chancellors ==
J. G. Meiring - 1960 to 1966

N.J Sieberhagen - 1966 to 1973

C. J. Kriel - 1973 to 1974 (acting)

Wynand Mouton - 1974 (interim)

Richard Ernest van der Ross - 1975 to 1986

Jakes Gerwel - 1987 to 1994

Cecil Abrahams - 1995 to 2000

Brian O Connell - 2001 to 2014

Tyrone Pretorius - 2015 to 2024

Robert Balfour - 2025 to present

=== Resistance against apartheid ===
During the first 15 years, the board and staff were primarily whites, supporting the National Party and apartheid. One of the few exceptions was Adam Small, head of the philosophy department. Small resigned in 1973 as a consequence of his involvement in the Black Consciousness Movement. Apart from lecturers like Small, there were many students who were active in the struggle against apartheid, and who were loyal to the Black Consciousness Movement. Protests from students against the conservative university board and lack of participation in the university led to the appointment of the first coloured rector, Richard E. van der Ross in 1975. The years thereafter gave way to a more liberal atmosphere, in which the university gradually distanced itself from apartheid. In 1982, the university rejected the apartheid ideology formally in its mission statement; during the next year, the university gained the same autonomy as white universities through the University of the Western Cape Act.

In the late 1980s and early 1990s, numerous UWC students were involved in the creation of Bush Radio, an anti-apartheid media project which distributed political and cultural radio programming via cassette tape due to the lack of a license to broadcast on a conventional radio platform. By 1993, the station went to air as a pirate radio station, and eventually became South Africa's first licensed community radio station.

Rector Jakes Gerwel made UWC an "intellectual home of the left", with attention to social and political issues. The university attracted increasing numbers of students from disadvantaged communities. Apart from coloured people, more and more black students enrolled. Gerwel was succeeded in 1995 by Cecil Abrahams, who was succeeded by Brian O'Connell in 2001. UWC retained the status of an autonomous university during the education restructuring of 2002.

UWC is the only African institution that is a member of the OpenCourseWare Consortium (OCWC), and was voted onto the OCWC board in 2007.

=== Today ===
UWC is a research-rich environment. The academic staff is highly qualified, with 50% holding doctorates. Most departments have graduate programmes, some with the largest intake in the country. There are many institutes and centres with a strong research emphasis, and there are significant projects and programmes which draw on expertise across departments and faculties. There are also joint endeavours between the University of the Western Cape, the University of Cape Town, and Stellenbosch University. 20% of all students at UWC are postgraduates.

Like other South African universities, UWC has been affected by sporadic student protests since 2015. The reasons for the protests change with each new period of protest. They began with the Fees Must Fall movement where the main goal was to get university fees to be state-funded and then grew to include issues surrounding student safety and accommodation. These protests often lead to the shutdown of academic activities at the university. Academic activities were suspended from 5 February 2020 to 7 February 2020 due to a delay in financial clearance which left many students unable to register for the new year.

Student Enrollment by Race 2019
Race	Percentage
African	47%
Coloured	44%
White	5%
Indian	3%
Other	2%

== International links ==
Research at the University of the Western Caribbean (UWC) maintains an international dimension, supported by institutional partnerships that facilitate the exchange of students and scholars. Several major research initiatives are conducted jointly with international collaborators, and university faculty frequently present at conferences and publish in academic journals and monographs. Institutional relationships exist with entities in Africa, Europe, and North America, resulting in research partnerships, collaborative capacity-building programs, and postgraduate student mobility. Additionally, UWC honours and master's graduates have received international scholarships and enrolled in doctoral programs abroad.

== Ranking ==
In 2014, Webometrics ranked the university the sixth best in South Africa, seventh best in Africa and 885th in the world. Webometrics ranked both the university's Faculty of Law and Dentistry the best in Africa.

UWC Times Higher Education Ranking 2016 to 2024
Year	World Rank
2024	601–800
2023	601–800
2022	601–800
2021	601–800
2020	601–800
2019	601–800
2018	601–800
2017	601-800
2016	501-600

== Children's Rights Project ==
The Children's Rights Project is a South African organisation. Located in the Community Law Centre, University of the Western Cape, its goal is the recognition and protection of children's rights within the framework of the United Nations Convention on the Rights of the Child, the African Charter on the Rights and Welfare of the Child and the Constitution of the Republic of South Africa.

== DSI-NRF Centre of Excellence in Food Security (CoE-FS) ==
Since 2014, UWC has hosted the DSI-NRF Centre of Excellence in Food Security (CoE-FS), and is the first historically disadvantaged institution to host a DSI-NRF Centre of Excellence. The CoE-FS is co-hosted with the University of Pretoria. The CoE-FS undertakes "innovative research and critical enquiry to enable South Africa to tackle the challenges of food security and nutrition". Several UWC-based researchers contribute to the CoE-FS's work, including Professor Julian May (CoE-FS) director and Professor Rina Swart (CoE-FS Nutrition lead).

== Notable alumni and staff ==
- Kamanda Bataringaya, (MD, MBA, MPH, Diploma in Health Management). Ugandan physician, diplomat and politician. Member of Parliament and Minister of State for Primary Education in Uganda (2009–2016). Obtained the degree of Master of Public Health from UWC in 2009.
- José Luís Guterres, East Timorese politician and diplomat
- Anthony Holiday, journalist, anti-apartheid activist, and academic, taught philosophy at UWC from the end of apartheid until 2005.
- Danny Jordaan, chief executive officer of the 2010 FIFA World Cup South Africa
- Patty Karuaihe-Martin, Business executive, Managing Director of NamibRe
- Sibongile Ndashe, lawyer and human rights activist
- Maurus Nekaro, Namibian politician, former Governor of Kavango Region (2010–2013)
- Leslie Felicia Petrik, founded of Environmental and Nano Science group, water remediation
- Colette Solomon, South African policy researcher, women's rights activist and the director of the non-governmental organisation Women on Farms Project
- John Walters (born 1956), Namibian ombudsman 2004–2021
- Zoe Wicomb, author, both attended and taught at UWC.

== See also ==
- S*, a collaboration between seven universities and the Karolinska Institutet for training in bioinformatics and genomics
- Open access in South Africa and List of South African open access repositories
