= Nambitha Mpumlwana =

South African actress, presenter and producer

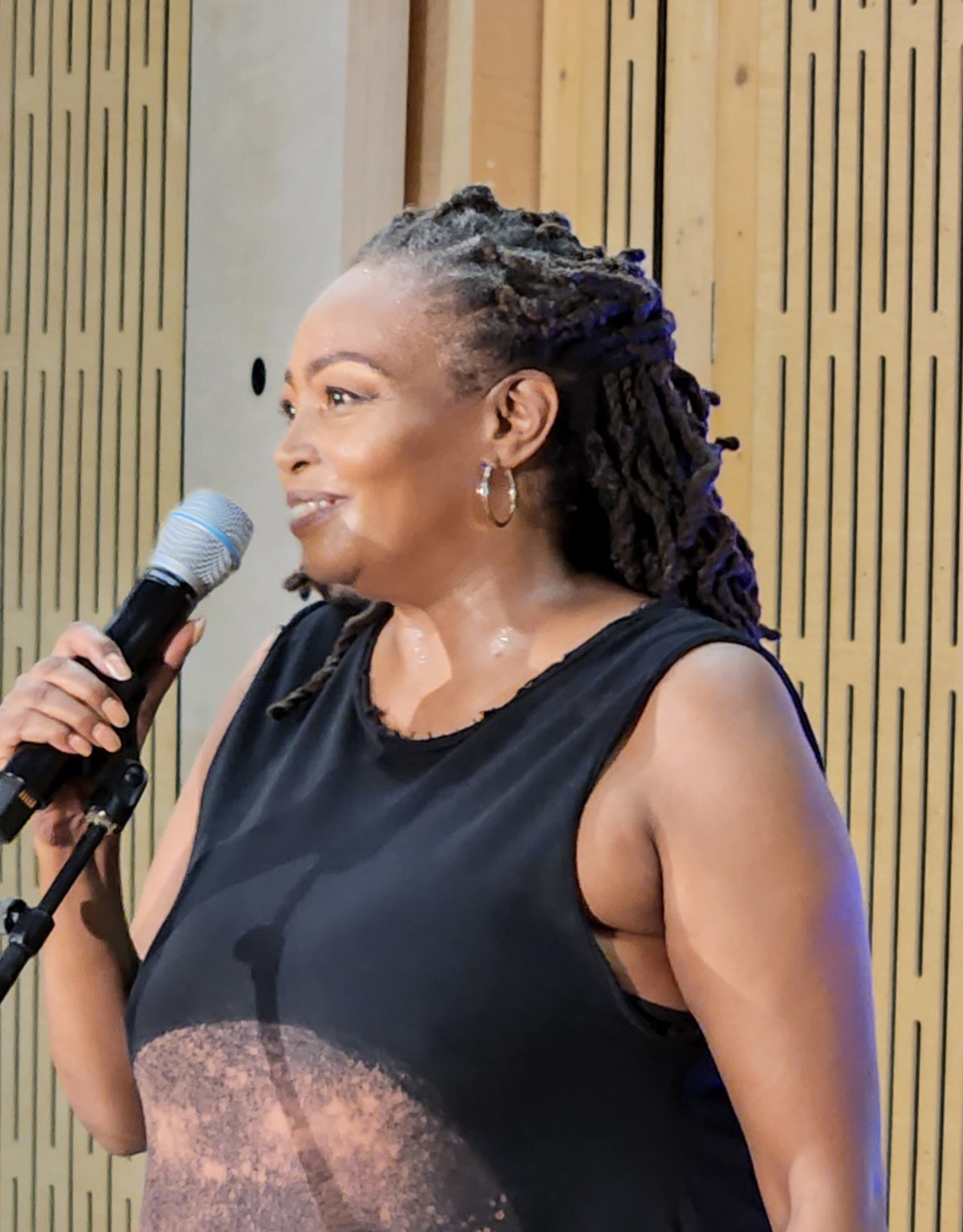
- Born: Nambitha Mpumlwana; 12 February 1967 (age 59); Mthatha, Eastern Cape, South Africa
- Occupations: actress; presenter; producer; businesswoman; philanthropist; humanitarian
- Years active: 1989–present
- Notable work: Ashes to Ashes; Generations
- Children: Vangile Mpumlwana
- Website: nambitha.com

Nambitha Mpumlwana (born 12 February 1967) is a South African actress, presenter, producer and niece to Loyiso Mpumlwana. She's known for her role as Mawande Memela in SABC 1's soapie, Generations. She was also cast in e.tv's Ashes to Ashes as Mandlakazi and was also an actress In a South Africa Film Tsotsi. She is also known for her role as Josephine in a series called The Kingdom. She appeared in Magenta coal as Matilda. After she's been scares for a while she came back to an original showmax series/telenovela which is SOFT LIFE as judge Iris Makaza.

== Early life ==
She was born in the Eastern Cape at Mtata.

== Career ==
Mpumlwana's career began as a continuity presenter for SABC before joining the SABC2 wildlife show 50/50 as a presenter. she also presented the SABC2 shows Lebone and Practical Parenting, as well as the SABC3 show Money. She has appeared in several films such as Tsotsi, Red Dust as well as Country Of My Skull. She gained recognition when she joined the popular SABC1 soapie, "Generations" in 2011, playing the role of "Mawande Memela" who is a mother of two and a business woman who goes through family matters and after losing it with her daughter, she got poisoned by her daughter and lost her mind. The drama kept unfolding. She also had a role on 7de laan.

== Awards and nominations ==
She won the Golden Horn Award for her role of Pearl Lusipho in the drama series The Lab.

== Filmography ==
=== Films ===
Year	Title	Role	Notes
1993	Tama Ba? Tama Na!		
2003	Beyond Borders		
2004	Red Dust		
2004	Country of My Skull		
2005	Tsotsi		
	Land of a Thousand Hills		
	Crazy Joe's Coco		

=== Television ===
Year	Title	Role	Notes
2009	7de Laan	Zandile	
2015	Ashes to Ashes	Mandlakazi Namane	
	Diamond Hunters	Dara	
	Generations	Mawande Memela	
	Interrogation Room	Captain Thandiswa	
	Isidingo	Nancy	
	Out Of The Box	Lebo	
	Shado's	Shado	
	Sokhulu & Partners	Thumi Sibisi	
	The Lab	Pearl Lusipho	
	Yizo Yizo	Grace Letsatsi	

||2021|| The Kingdom || Josephine|| |- ||2024|| Soft Life ||Iris Makaza||
