= Leslie Felicia Petrik =

South African Academic

- Education: University of Western Cape (PhD)
- Occupations: Chemist, Researcher and Academic
- Employer: University of Western Cape
- Honours: Fellow, African Academy of Sciences

Leslie Felicia Petrik is a South African scientist that specialises in nanoscience and environmental chemistry at the University of Western Cape. She is the founder of the Environmental and Nano Sciences (ENS) research group and a fellow of the African Academy of Sciences.

== Education ==
Petrik earned her PhD in Chemistry from the University of Western Cape in 2008.

== Career ==
Petrik holds a faculty position at the University of Western Cape, where she established and leads the Environmental and Nano Sciences (ENS) research group. Her research focuses on sustainable solutions for industrial waste management and water remediation, particularly the conversion of fly ash into value added products.

Her research has received support from funding bodies including the Water Research Commission, the National Research Foundation, and partners including Eskom, Sasol and Coaltech.

== Awards and recognition ==
Petrik won the National Science and Technology Forum Award in 2018 for her research contributions to sustainable water resource management in South Africa, and was elected in the same year as a Fellow of the African Academy of Sciences.

In 2010, she won the Department of Trade and Industry's THRIP technology award.

== Selected publications ==
- Science breaks new ground in converting coal ash from pollutant to useful products.
- Paul, Suvash Chandra; van Rooyen, Algurnon S.; van Zijl, Gideon P.A.G.; Petrik, Leslie Felicia (2018). "Properties of cement-based composites using nanoparticles: A comprehensive review". Construction and Building Materials. 189: 1019–1034. doi:10.1016/j.conbuildmat.2018.09.062.
- Ojemaye, Cecilia Y.; Petrik, Leslie (2019). "Pharmaceuticals in the marine environment: a review". Environmental Reviews. 27 (2): 151–165. Bibcode:2019EnvRv..27..151O. doi:10.1139/er-2018-0054. hdl:1807/93567. ISSN 1181-8700.
