= The Viewing Booth =

2019 documentary film

- Promotional release poster
- Directed by: Ra'anan Alexandrowicz
- Produced by: Ra'anan Alexandrowicz; Liran Atzmor
- Starring: Maia Levy
- Cinematography: Zachery Reese
- Edited by: Neta Dvorkis; Ra'anan Alexandrowicz
- Production company: Atzmor Productions
- Distributed by: Roco Films
- Release date: May 2019 (Docaviv)
- Running time: 71 minutes
- Countries: Israel; United States
- Languages: English; Arabic; Hebrew

The Viewing Booth is a 2019 documentary film directed, co-produced and co-edited by Ra'anan Alexandrowicz. An international co-production of Israel and the United States, the film features a Jewish American college student named Maia Levy. Levy, a staunch supporter of Israel, is shown videos depicting Palestinian life under Israeli military rule in the West Bank, causing her to contemplate her worldview and her beliefs about the Israeli–Palestinian conflict.

== Synopsis ==
At Temple University, director Ra'anan Alexandrowicz puts out an open call for students interested in Israel to be filmed while watching online videos from Israel. Though seven students participated, The Viewing Booth focuses primarily on Maia Levy, a Jewish American student and a supporter of Israel. Some of the videos selected are from the non-profit organization B'Tselem, whose aim is to document human rights violations in the Israeli-occupied Palestinian territories, while others are from pro-Israel sources.

Over the course of an hour and a half, Levy watches 11 videos. Among them are a dispute in Huwara, in which a soldier demands that a man who identifies as being with B'Tselem turn off his camera; Israel Defense Forces (IDF) soldiers interacting with a wounded terrorist after an attempted terrorist attack at a bus stop; a B'Tselem video of IDF soldiers interrogating a one-armed boy and an adult about the whereabouts of another boy; a B'Tselem video of a 2015 night search of a Palestinian family's home in Hebron by masked IDF soldiers, in which they ask for the family members' IDs and wake their children from sleeping; an Israeli woman pressuring a Palestinian woman to enter a caged area (while calling the Palestinian woman and her daughters "whores") as an IDF soldier watches; Israeli citizens yelling and throwing stones at Palestinian people while IDF soldiers stand by; a video by the pro-Israel News 0404 of a child hugging an IDF soldier; and a child being grabbed by an IDF soldier, and kicked by another.

While watching the videos, Levy expresses that she feels a level of skepticism when viewing videos from B'Tselem, noting that her pro-Israel parents dismiss B'Tselem videos as staged, anti-Israel propaganda. She also verbalizes a lack of context surrounding the videos; for example, in response to the video of the 2015 night search of the Palestinian family's home, she suggests that the soldiers searching the home may have received a tip that there is a bomb in the house, and that because such context is missing, the soldiers' actions appear to be unjustified. She also describes several of the videos as appearing to be staged, including the News 0404 video of a child hugging a soldier; she describes the video of a child being grabbed by a soldier and kicked by another as staged as well, though she relents somewhat upon watching the video more than once.

Over six months later, Levy agrees to return for a second session. This time, Alexandrowicz has Levy view the footage recorded during their first session of her watching the videos, so that she can react to and comment on her responses from over six months prior. In reviewing the video of the night search, Levy compares the video to reality television, postulating that the footage is "real" but manipulated in order to add drama and conflict. Alexandrowicz asks Levy what caused her to suggest that there may have been a report of a bomb in the house; she determines that she may have derived that possibility from episodes of the television series Fauda. Alexandrowicz suggests to Levy that she may be looking for inconsistencies in videos that she has preconceived biases against, and wonders if the medium of film/video is able to cause someone to change their beliefs and worldview. Levy expresses how difficult it can be for an individual to adjust their beliefs and worldview, as these can be inextricably tied to their identity as a person, and states that, "Sometimes when you question your beliefs and you come up with better answers, they reinforce your beliefs even more."

== Production ==
In 2017, director Ra'anan Alexandrowicz put out an open call at Temple University for participants in what would become The Viewing Booth. Seven people responded, along with Jewish American student Maia Levy, who texted Alexandrowicz that she was interested in participating. One of the original respondents was unable to participate, and so Levy took their place. Alexandrowicz stated that "Maia's politics are radically different from mine. At the same time, she's a curious and critical viewer. She doesn't shy away from images uncomfortable for her. In a nutshell, she is my ideal viewer."

== Release ==
The Viewing Booth screened at Docaviv in Tel Aviv, Israel, in May 2019, as part of the festival's Israeli Competition. It later screened at the Berlin International Film Festival in Berlin, Germany, in 2020, as well as at Doc NYC in New York City from 11 to 19 November 2020.

== Reception ==
On Rotten Tomatoes, the film has an approval rating of 73% based on 15 reviews, with an average rating of 6.8/10.

Tomris Laffly of Variety noted how "Alexandrowicz manages to zero in on the real-time emotional battle that unfolds on Maia's face" as she watches the videos presented to her. Laffly concluded: "One wonders whether The Viewing Booth could have gained something from featuring additional subjects – a broader perspective from a variety of voices, [...] These considerations aside, The Viewing Booth proves to be at its most absorbing when it resembles a cinematic infinity mirror of sorts." Rolling Stone's David Fear gave the film a score of four-and-a-half out of five stars, concluding: "Alexandrowicz may have given us the single best documentary of the year; he has undoubtedly given us one of the most vital." Joseph Fahim of Middle East Eye called the film "a fascinating, trailblazing experiment that investigates how we see and decode images, while simultaneously interrogating their veracity – or rather, in this post-structuralist world, if the image has any veracity."

The Guardian's Phil Hoad gave the film three out of five stars, calling it "Not just a valuable crash course in digital-age hermeneutics, this is a gauntlet thrown down to film-makers with an old-fashioned belief in the truth." Beatrice Loayza of The New York Times wrote, "Though moderately compelling to bear witness to one individual's objections in real time, The Viewing Booth touches on gloomy truths about spectatorship in the digital era that might have felt novel a decade ago. Inundated as we are by traumatizing images and indiscriminate claims of 'fake news,' it should come as no surprise that our ideological bubbles are actually quite difficult to burst." Noel Murray of The A.V. Club noted that Levy "doesn't come off as a hard-liner. She's doing what should be expected of media consumers: trying to understand the larger context of images, especially when they're meant to stir the emotions. (She's just as dubious watching footage of Israeli soldiers handing out presents as she is of the more unflattering scenes.) [...] Maia isn't some extremist blaming shocking footage on fakers or 'crisis actors.' Instead, like so many of us, when she sees something unpleasant, she reacts in a very instinctive, human way... before she spins the images into something that fits into a preexisting worldview."

== See also ==
- onceinabuemoonfilms.com
- Confirmation bias
