= Siyabonga =

Siyabonga (Sibongile female) is a South African given name/term meaning "Thanks or Thank you". Notable people with the name include:

- Siyabonga Booi (born 1986), South African cricketer
- Siyabonga Cwele (born 1957), South African politician
- Siyabonga Gama, South African politician
- Siyabonga Ngezana (born 1997), South African footballer
- Siyabonga Mabena (born 2007), South African football player
- Siyabonga Mbatha (born 1989), South African football player
- Siyabonga Mdluli (born 1986), Swaziland football player
- Siyabonga Mpontshane (born 1986), South African football goalkeeper
- Siyabonga Nhlapo (born 1988), South African football midfielder
- Siyabonga Nkosi (born 1981), South African football player
- Siyabonga Nomvethe (born 1977), South African football striker
- Siyabonga Nontshinga (born 1987), South African football striker
- Scarra Ntubeni (born Siyabonga Ntubeni in 1991), South African rugby union footballer
- Siyabonga Sangweni (born 1981), South African football defender
- Siyabonga Shibe (born 1978), South African actor
- Siyabonga Siphika (born 1981), South African football midfielder
