= Siyabonga Shibe =

South African actor

- Born: Siyabonga Melongisi Shibe; 3 February 1978 (age 48); Umlazi, KwaZulu-Natal, South Africa
- Education: Technikon Natal
- Occupation: Actor
- Years active: 2002-present
- Notable work: Scandal!; Uzalo; Ashes to Ashes; James' Journey to Jerusalem; Gaz'Lam
- Children: One child Yena Realeboga Shibe.
- Awards: see below

Siyabonga Mlungisi Shibe (born 23 February 1978) is a South African actor from Umlazi, KwaZulu-Natal.

== Early life ==
Shibe was born and raised in Umlazi, Kwazulu-Natal. He attended Ganges Secondary School, where his teachers encouraged him to pursue acting. As a child, Shibe would regularly participate in community plays in Umlazi. After finishing high school, he went to study drama at Technikon Natal. Shibe, along other fellow students at Technikon Natal, formed a theatre group called Amagugu. After completing his studies he went to Johannesburg to further pursue his dream of being an actor. Siyabonga Shibe is a father of 1. Yena Realeboga Shibe age 11.

== Career ==
Upon his arrival in Johannesburg, he faced various obstacles but his luck changed when he bagged an advert for HIV/AIDS awareness. He went on to land a role in a feature film called The Stripes of a Hero.

In 2002 to 2005, he bagged a leading role as Sifiso in the SABC1 drama series Gaz'lam. The series went on to receive multiple nominations from the South African Film and Television Awards. After he finished filming the first season of Gaz'lam, Shibe was cast as James in the feature film James' Journey to Jerusalem, written and directed by Ra'anan Alexandrowicz. The film revolves around an African teenager named James who goes on a pilgrimage to the Holy Land on behalf of his village. Shibe ended up winning the Best Male Actor award at the Jerusalem International Film Festival. He also landed a role in the Canadian mini-series Human Cargo. The series won seven Gemini Awards and two Directors Guild Awards. He also starred in the British series Wild At Heart and Mtunzini.com; however, Shibe resigned from the latter due to financial disputes.

In 2006, he played the role of Mad Dog in the feature film The Trail. In 2007, he played the role of Mandla Nyawose in the drama series Bay of Plenty. In 2008, he was cast to portray the role of Thami in the drama series A Place Called Home. From 2010 to 2014, Shibe portrayed the character of Kila, a smart, shrewd and violent taxi driver in the e.tv soap opera Scandal!. He was awarded the Best Actor award at the Duku Duku Awards for his role as Kila.

In 2015, Shibe landed a role in the e.tv telenovela Ashes to Ashes; his portrayal of the character Kgosi earned him a SAFTA nomination for Best Actor.

In 2017, he left Johannesburg for Durban to join the most viewed South African television show, Uzalo, where he portrays the role of Qhabanga Mhlongo.

== Filmography ==
=== Television roles ===
- Ashes to Ashes (Kgosi)
- Z'bondiwe (Bheka Shabangu)
- A Place Called Home (as Thami)
- Bay of Plenty (as Mandla Nyawose)
- Doubt (as Captain Dube)
- Gaz'lam (as Sifiso)
- Generations (as Joshua)
- Home Affairs (as Zakes)
- Isidingo (as Detective Nelson Xaba)
- Is'thunzi (as Matthews)
- Madiba (as Chief Jongintaba)
- Mtunzini.com (as Waxy)
- Scandal! (as Kila)
- Silent Witness (as Maidstone)
- Stokvel (as Richard)
- Wild at Heart (Themba Khumalo)
- Uzalo (Qhabanga Khumalo)
- The Wife (Gwaza Majola)
- Sibongile & The Dlamini's (Njengaye Dlamini)

== Personal life ==
Siyabonga Shibe is a father of one

== Awards and nominations ==
Year	Award Ceremony	Prize	Recipient/Nominated work	Result
2003	Jerusalem International Film Festival	Best Male Actor Award	Siyabonga Shibe as James (James' Journey to Jerusalem)	Won
2006	South African Film and Television Awards	Golden Horn Award for Best Actor in a TV Drama	Siyabonga Shiba as Sifiso (Gaz'Lam)	Nominated
2015	Duku Duku Awards	Best Actor in a Drama	Siyabonga Shibe as Kila (Scandal!)	Won
2016	South African Film and Television Awards	Golden Horn Award for Best Supporting Actor in a TV Soap	Siyabonga Shibe as Shabangu (Ashes to Ashes)	Nominated
2024	Simon Sabela Film and Television Awards	Best Actor Film	Nhlanhla (Blind Eye)	Pending

== See also ==
- Uzalo
- Ashes to Ashes
- Scandal!
- James' Journey to Jerusalem
