= Maggie Benedict =

South African actress, writer, director

- Born: Maggie Benedict; 10 February 1981 (age 45); Pretoria, Gauteng, South Africa
- Education: Tshwane University of Technology
- Occupations: Actress; writer; director
- Years active: 2010–present
- Television: Generations
- Awards: South African Film and Television Awards for Best-supporting actress.

Maggie Benedict (born in Pretoria on 10 February 1981) is a South African actress, writer and director. She studied acting at Pretoria Tech. Benedict is best known for playing the role of Akhona Miya on the SABC 1 soap opera Generations (2011-2014).

Benedict has appeared in films including Attack On Durfur (2009), Step to a Start Up (2014) and Queen of Katwe (2016). She received the South African Film and Television Awards for best ensemble cast award for her performance in the 2011 film The Mating Game. During her theatre stint, Benedict performed at the Civic Theatre in Showboat and Goldilocks and The Three Bears.

On television, Benedict starred as Akhona Miya in the SABC drama Generations from 2011 to 2014, and as Violet in the e.tv telenovela series Ashes To Ashes (2015–2016), for which she received South African Film and Television Awards for Best-supporting actress. From 2010 to 2011, she co-starred as Zoey Matsekwa in the M-Net/kykNET soapie Binnelanders.

== Early life and education ==
Benedict was born 10 February 1981, in Pretoria, province of Gauteng, the daughter of a retired teacher, and a medical doctor. She has two siblings, Nkoni and Abel Benedict. Benedict graduated from Pretoria Technikon (Now known as Tshwane University of Technology), where she started acting.

In 2007, Benedict graduated from New York's, Michael Howard Studios. As a college student, she made she would be found hanging around in libraries. While at the school, Benedict performed in various Stage productions and school plays, including "Does Anyone Know Sarah Paisner" and "Anais Nin Goes To Hell". In 2008, she appeared in Anthony Minghella's film adaption of Alexander McCall Smith 's series of books The No. 1 Ladies' Detective Agency, she starred in the movie along Jill Scott and Anika Noni Rose.

== Film career & Television career ==
Benedict has guest-starred on several television shows, including SABC 3 Hard Copy (2006), the kykNET series Hartland in 2011, and SABC 2 Geraamtes in die Kas in (2013-2011).

In 2007, After graduating from college, she landed a role on 7de Laan. This was her first TV show, she portrayed the role of Lebo.

In 2010 Benedict starred as Grace Molele in the SABC 2 drama series, The Mating Game, in 2010 alongside Renate Stuurman and Elma Postma. It was based on, the personal lives of three women struggling with motherhood, love and friendship. Between April 2010 and 2011, she was cast in the M-Net/kykNET soapie Binnelanders (which was known as Binneland Sub Judice at the time).

=== Generations (2011-2014 Axed) ===
On 12 October 2011, she made her debut on SABC1 popular soapie Generations, where she played role of Akhona Memela Miya, The role brought Benedict widespread recognition and critical acclaim. The soap was an instant success in the ratings (with almost 7 million viewers per episode), and Benedict became an audience favourite. In 2014, Benedict and other 15 actors were dismissed after they went on strike (for wage increase) and failed to meet a deadline set by the producer to return to work. After Generations executive producer Mfundi Vundla fired the actors from the program and terminated their contracts, The actors (Generations 16) took legal actions.

=== Ashes To Ashes - present ===
In February 2015, several months after the "Generations 16" actors saga, Benedict and other actors who were fired joined etv new telenovela Ashes To Ashes (2015-2016).

== Filmography ==
Year	Title	Role	Notes
2009	Attack On Darfur	Halima	Directed by Uwe Boll
2014	Step To a start up	Sophie Rammala	Directed by Bobby Heaney
2016	Queen Of Kwate	Chess Federation Secretary	Directed by Mira Nair

=== Television ===
Year	Title	Role	Episodes	Notes
2006	Hard Copy	Noxee	25	
2007	7de Laan	Lebo		
2009	The No. 1 Ladies' Detective Agency	Violet	1	
2010	Geraamtes in die Kas	Bongi van der Merwe	1	
2011	Hartland	Xolile	1	
2010-2011	Binnelanders	Zoey Matsekwa	41	
2011–2014	Generations	Akhona Mamela Miya	10	
2015 – 2016	Ashes To Ashes	Violet	41	
2017	The Good Doctor	Georgieta Bangura	1	S1 E9 Intangibles
2017	Super Wings!	Bokamoso	1	
2018	The Romanoffs	Personal Nurse	1	
2018	Random Acts of Flyness	Lawyer	1	
2022	New Amsterdam	Doctor Charmaine Stewart	1	Episode 12
