= Tina Jaxa =

South African actress (born 1970)

- Born: Albertina Jaxa; 27 October 1970 (age 55); Cape Town, Western Cape, South Africa
- Occupation: Actress
- Years active: 1993–present
- Spouse: Prosper Mkwaiwa (m. 2000; div. 2015)
- Children: 2
- Awards: an Africa Movie Academy Award for Best Film Best Supporting Actress in a Feature Film

Albertina Jaxa (born 27 October 1970) is a South African actress. Tina Jaxa had a role in BET Redemption as Evelyn Zikode who wants to continue her father's legacy. She's also known as Dora on a NETFLIX original 2024 movie Disaster Holiday. She began her career in 1993 on the television series Generations and later appeared in the soap opera Isidingo.

== Career ==
Jaxa began her acting career in 1993, when she featured in Generations. She went on to join the cast of soap opera Isidingo for three years, and later returned to the show in 2004.

Jaxa has appeared in films including Oddball Hall, The Bird Can't Fly, and I Now Pronounce You Black and White. She won an Africa Movie Academy Award for Best Film for Best Supporting Actress in a Feature Film for her role in the 2013 romantic thriller film, Of Good Report. Jaxa played domestic maintenance assistant Eve Sisulu in the eTV sitcom Madam & Eve, and her acting received positive reviews. Jaxa announced a hiatus from acting in January 2014, which lasted nine months. Since returning from this hiatus, she has appeared in television shows such as Shreds and Dreams, Isikizi, 90 Plein Street, Ashes to Ashes, Mzansi Magic drama series Nkululeko, and the e.tv soap opera Rhythm City.

After returning to Isidingo in 2004, she went on to act in number of television dramas and comedies, including Khululeka, 7de Laan, Charlie Jade, The Final Verdict, Montana, Stokvel, Shreds and Dreams and the second season of Intersexions.

Jaxa has also appeared in theatre productions, including Skewe Sirkel, directed by Marthinus Basson; Rygrond, directed by Charles Fourie; and Soweto, directed by Phyllis Klotz.

From 2015 to 2016, Jaxa starred in the critically acclaimed e.tv original telenovela series Gold Diggers as May Gumede and received a South African Film and Television Award (SAFTA) for Best Actress for the role. In 2016, Jaxa had roles in two drama series: Isikizi, a Mzansi Magic xhosa drama, for which she received a SAFTA nomination for Best supporting actress in a TV drama, and a supporting role in eTV's Telenovela Ashes to Ashes.

In 2019, Jaxa appeared as Noma in the SABC 1 comedy-drama Makoti.

== Personal life ==
In 2000 Jaxa married engineer Prosper Mkwaiwa at Usambara Wedding Village, near Krugersdorp. The couple later divorced after 15 years of marriage. The couple had two children together.

In 2015, weeks after the death of her ex-husband Prosper Mkwaiwa, Jaxa was involved in a controversy with Tina Dlangwana (Mkwaiwa's second wife) over who was the lawful spouse. According to Sunday Sun, Makwaiwa's mother and family recognise Tina Mkwaiwa (Prosper's traditional wife) as the only true daughter-in-law.

In February 2015, the Daily Sun reported that Jaxa was allegedly assaulted by her then 19-year-old son. According to the publication, the actress opened two assault cases against her son who attempted to physically assault her when she refused to give him money.

== Filmography ==
| Year | Title | Role |
|---|---|---|
| 1990 | Oddball Hall | Tennanna |
| 2007 | The Bird Can't Fly | Mercy |
| 2010 | I Now Pronounce You Black and White | The Sangoma |
| 2012 | Chandies | Dorethea |
| 2013 | Of Good Report | Headmistress |
| 2015 | While You Weren't Looking | Milly Thulo |
| 2016 | Beyond Return and Wedding | |
| 2024 | Disaster Holiday | Dora |

=== Television ===
| Year | Title | Role | Episodes | | |
|---|---|---|---|---|---|
| 1994 –1996 | Generations | Priscilla Mthembu | | | |
| 1998–2000 | Isidingo | Lorraine Dhlomo | | | |
| 2019 | 7de Laan | Ruth | | | |
| 2005–2009 | Madam & Eve | Eve Sisulu | | | |
| 2012–2012 | Stokvel | Mrs Pink | | | |
| 2012-2013 | Montana | Connie Santos | | | |
| 2013–2013 | Intersexions | Nokuthula | | | |
| 2014–2015 | 90 Plein Street | Mrs Maduna | | | |
| 2014-2015 | Shreds and Dreams | Paula | | | |
| 2014-2015 | uSkroef noSexy | Wendy | | | |
| 2016-2017 | Isikizi | Zinzi | | | |
| 2016-2016 | Ashes to Ashes | Nokulunga Radebe | | | |
| 2016-2017 | Gold Diggers | May Gumede | | | |
| 2018 | Nkululeko | Tina | | | |
| 2018 | Vula Vala | - | 2019–present | Makoti | Noma |
| 2025 | Bad Influencer | Doreen | | | |
| 2021–present | Durban Gen | Nomvula Jack | | | |
