= The Law in These Parts =

- Film poster
- Directed by: Ra'anan Alexandrowicz
- Written by: Ra’anan Alexandrowicz
- Produced by: Liran Atzmor
- Cinematography: Shark De Mayo
- Edited by: Neta Dvorkis
- Music by: Karni Postel
- Release date: 2011
- Running time: 101 minutes
- Country: Israel
- Language: Hebrew

The Law in These Parts (Hebrew: שלטון החוק) is a 2011 Israeli documentary film, written and directed by Ra'anan Alexandrowicz, about the court system operated by the Israel Defense Forces in the West Bank. It won the Best Documentary award at the 2011 Jerusalem Film Festival and the World Cinema Grand Jury Prize in Documentary at the 2012 Sundance Film Festival. At the Hot Docs Canadian International Documentary Festival, The Law in These Parts won the Special Jury Prize from the Best International Feature Documentary award jury.

The documentary is divided into five chapters and reviews the legal history of Israel's occupation of Arab territories. Alexandrowicz interviews a number of the judges who were responsible for carrying out the orders of military commanders. Only judges who presided over occupation-related cases are interviewed; as Alexandrowicz noted, “This film is not about the people who broke the law. It’s about the people who wrote the law.”

== See also ==
- The Gatekeepers

Awards
Preceded by Hell and Back Again	Sundance Grand Jury Prize: World Cinema Documentary; 2012	Succeeded by A River Changes Course
