= Mmabatho Mogomotsi =

South African actress

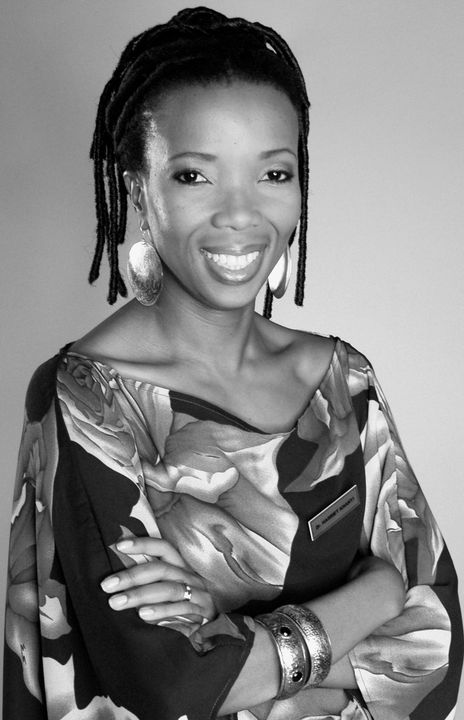
- Born: Mmabaho Mogomotsi; 14 February 1972 (age 54); Madidi, North-West Province, South Africa
- Education: Bachelor of Dramatic Arts, Drama Therapy Honors, Masters Drama Therapy University of Witwatersrand
- Alma mater: University of Witwatersrand
- Occupations: Drama Therapist, Actress Producer
- Years active: 1995–present
- Known for: Acting, Voice-Over Artist, Television Production
- Spouse: Sello Molefe
- Children: 2
- Website: www.dramatherapy.joburg

Mmabatho Mogomotsi is a South African actress, television producer and Drama Therapist. She is best known for the roles in the television serials such as; Ashes to Ashes, Hillside, Ingozi, The Wild and Yizo Yizo.

== Personal life ==
She graduated with a degree in Dramatic Arts from the University of Witwatersrand. She also holds an Honors and Masters Degree in Drama Therapy from the University of Witwatersrand in Johannesburg, South Africa.

She lives in Johannesburg, where she also practices as a professional Drama Therapist registered with the HPCSA- Health Professional Council of South Africa. She is a married mother of two young women.

== Career ==
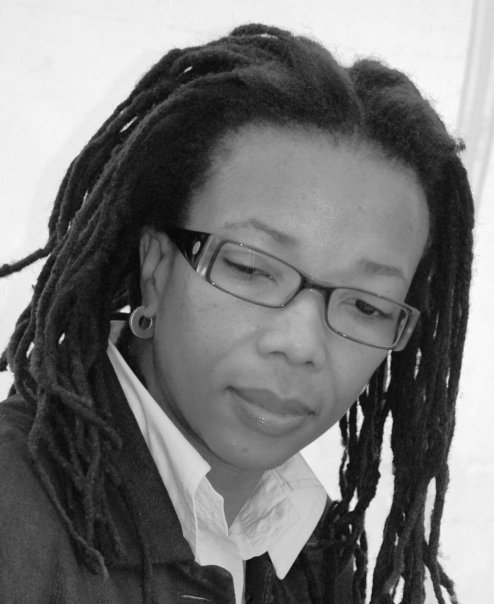

In 1999, she joined with the SABC1 drama serial Yizo Yizo and played the role "Snowey". After receiving popularity for her role, she continued to play the role until the end of third season in 2004. After that, she appeared in the second season of police procedural Zero Tolerance with the role "Sonia". In 2006, she played the role of "Botshelo" in the 'Heartlines' film The Other Woman. In the meantime, she also appeared in the medical drama serial Hillside with the role "Harriet Khanyi", where she continued to play the role until 2008. Apart from that, she appeared in the television serials such as; Dark Angels, Sorted, Homecoming, Mponeng, Crossing the Line and Izoso Connexion.

In 2008, she acted in the feature film Mafrika by playing the role of "Head Nurse Maria". In 2009, she joined the second season of the SABC2 drama serial 90 Plein Street. In the meantime, she joined with two popular soap operas: as "Moipone" in Muvhango and as "Tshego Tselapedi" in Rhythm City. In 2015, she played the role of "Magistrate" in the season two of e.tv telenovela Ashes to Ashes. In the same year, she performed in the stage play The Pen and in the first ever Setswana play called Lepatata at Market Theatre and took a two-year sabbatical. Then in 2017, she joined with SABC1 drama Ingozi and played the role "Makgotso Sebotsane" in first two seasons. Meanwhile, she played the role "Candy" in Mzansi Magic drama Imposter. In 2020, she joined with another Mzansi Magic telenovela Gomora for the role "Tono".

Apart from acting, she is an Executive Director of Making Amends Foundation, a professional organisation that facilitates personal growth and promote health by facilitating healing for individuals with a range of mental illnesses, cognitive and developmental disorders using Drama Therapy. She is also a Founding Partner and Director at Joburgtv (a digital media broadcasting company) and Joburg Digital Hub (a multidisciplinary digital media, creative arts technology and content creation centre based in Johannesburg).

== Filmography ==
| Year | Film | Role | Genre | Ref. |
|---|---|---|---|---|
| 1999 | Yizo Yizo | Snowey | TV series | |
| 2001 | Transit Cafe | Regina | TV movie | |
| 2004 | Zero Tolerance | Sonia | TV series | |
| 2004 | Homecoming | Carol | TV mini series | |
| 2005 | Sorted | Guest role | TV series | |
| 2006 | Heartlines | Botshelo | TV series | |
| 2006 | Hillside | Dr. Harriet Khanyi | TV series | |
| 2006 | Izoso Connexion | Alice | TV series | |
| 2008 | Jacob's Cross | Lesedi | TV series | |
| | Muvhango | Moipone | TV series | |
| | Rhythm City | Tshego Tselapedi | TV series | |
| 2008 | Surprise! | Maria Head Nurse | Video | |
| 2009 | 90 Plein Street | The Speaker | TV series | |
| 2011 | The Wild | Flora | TV series | |
| 2015 | Ashes to Ashes | Magistrate | TV series | |
| 2017 | Ingozi | Makgotso Sebotsane | TV series | |
| 2018 | Imposter | Candy | TV series | |
| 2020 | Gomora | Tono | TV series | |
| 2023 | Outlaws | Moretlo Tšeole | Tv series | |
