= Patty Karuaihe-Martin =

Namibian accountant and business executive

Patty Karuaihe–Martin
- Born: Petronella Amalia Karuaihe–Martin; 22 June 1969 (age 57); Namibia
- Education: University of the Western Cape; University of KwaZulu-Natal
- Occupation: Business executive
- Employer: NamibRe
- Organization: The JP Karuaihe Trust Fund
- Known for: Financial services
- Notable work: Telecom Namibia (Regional Manager); TransNamib (Senior Manager); PwC (Director); NamibRe (MD)
- Title: Managing Director at NamibRe

Petronella Amalia Karuaihe–Martin commonly Patty Karuaihe-Martin (born 22 June 1969), is a Namibian accountant and business executive, who serves as the Managing Director at Namibia National Reinsurance Corporation (NamibRe), a Namibia State-owned enterprise established in 1998 to manage offshore reinsurance, since October 2014.

Between May 2023 and January 2024, Patty was vice president at African Insurance Organization (AIO), the organization she had been in board members since May 2018. Prior to joining NamibRe, Patty had served in different positions at PwC Namibia for 10 years, since 2003, as director responsible for Indirect Tax, and Taxation and Advisory Leader. Since December 2022, Patty is a member of United Nations Environment Programme Finance Initiative (UNEP FI), and co-chair of its Global Steering Committee.

== Early life and education ==
Patty was born on 22 June 1969, raised in Windhoek, Namibia where she grew up and attended high school at the Concordia College, Windhoek until 1987. In 1988, Patty enrolled in University of the Western Cape, South Africa where she attended faculty of Commerce, she graduated with bachelor's degree in 1991. Patty also holds bachelor's degree with honours in Commerce from University of KwaZulu-Natal, South Africa since 2003.

== Career ==
In 1992, Patty started her career at EY Namibia as Article Trainee the position she served until 1995, later on, she joined Telecom Namibia and served as Regional Manager until 1997. Subsequently, Patty was appointed at TransNamib as Senior Manager responsible for internal audit. Between 2002 and 2003, she was a lecturer at University of Namibia teaching in Accounting and Auditing department.

In 2003, Patty joined PwC Namibia where she was appointed as senior manager responsible for indirect tax, in 2004, she got promoted to Director responsible for Indirect Tax at the company. She served this position for 6 years. Since 2010, she continued her time at PwC Namibia as Taxation and Advisory Leader until 2013. Subsequently, Patty held a position of head of the Tax Reforms Project in the Namibia Ministry of Finance until October 2014 when she was appointed managing director at NamibRe. During her time at NamibRe, the company had recorded an increase in its asset component from US$10 million to US$50 million in the first five years.

== Additional career ==
Between 2019 and 2023, Patty served as Chairperson of Organization for Eastern and Southern Africa Insurers (OESAI).

== Social impact ==
Patty has been the Chairperson of the JP Karuaihe Trust Fund since 1999. The foundation was founded in honor of Judge JP Karuaihe. Since its founding, the foundation has provided financial aid to approximately 70 meritorious students from Namibia who are now directors, judges, and attorneys who contribute to the socioeconomic advancement of their nation.

== Recognitions ==
- 2017: Business Insurance Women to Watch by EMEA.
- 2017: CEO Global Regional Winner, Public Enterprise Award by Titans and Global Awards.
- 2017: Namibia and SADC, Africa's Most Influential Women in Business and Government.
- 2017: Top 50 Women in Insurance in Africa by AIO and PILA.
- 2023: Top 10 Women to Watch in the Insurance Sector award by Angaza Forum.
