= James' Journey to Jerusalem =

- Directed by: Ra'anan Alexandrowicz
- Written by: Ra'anan Alexandrowicz; Sami Duenias
- Produced by: Renen Schorr
- Starring: Siyabonga Melongisi Shibe
- Release date: 19 May 2003
- Running time: 91 minutes
- Country: Israel
- Languages: Hebrew; English; Zulu

James' Journey to Jerusalem (Hebrew: מסעות ג'יימס בארץ הקודש) is a 2003 Israeli film directed by Ra'anan Alexandrowicz and produced by Renen Schorr.

== Plot ==
The film's plot focuses on an African teenager named James (Siyabonga Melongisi Shibe), who goes on a pilgrimage to the Holy Land on behalf of his village. Upon arriving in Israel, James is suspected to be an illegal foreign worker and, as a result, is arrested. Shimi (Salim Daw), a contractor of foreign workers, releases him on bail to work with him. After James explains to him that he did not travel to Israel to work, Shimi clarifies to him that since he paid for his release, James now owes him. Therefore, James is forced to interrupt his journey and begin working for Shimi.

Shimi tries to gain a profit at James' expense and makes him work for other people as well. Shimi's wife sees him as a kind of an amusement.

Salah, Shimi's father, soon discovers that James is exceptionally lucky rolling dice and he decides to exploit this in order to win in backgammon games against his friends. James hopes to pay his debt to Shimi so that he can finally reach Jerusalem, but as time passes he learns how to conduct with the locals. Salah keeps telling good-hearted and guileless James "Don't be a frayer (sucker)", and eventually James ceases to be one: he starts managing his foreign worker friends, and soon he becomes a cheap labor contractor himself, just like Shimi. James buys himself nice clothes, a mobile phone and a TV. As a result, he forgets about the pilgrimage.

Eventually James remembers the original reason for which he arrived in Israel, but it is already too late – he is arrested by the immigration police and transferred to an Israeli prison. The prison is located in the Russian Compound in Jerusalem, and so as he is handcuffed, James finally gets to see the city for which his village prays to.

== Film history ==
Alexandrowicz said that the plot was inspired by a true history of a Nigerian man he knew, who came to Israel on a tourist visa and became an illegal worker. He changed the nationality of James to Zulu intending for James to be from the place most remote from Western culture values. Accordingly, he picked the actor, Siyabonga Shibe, from South Africa.

The situation described in the film is quite uncommon, but legally possible: after an arrest for an illegal stay in Israel, a person is either deported or someone may post a bail and give a work permit.

== Cast ==
| Actor | Character |
|---|---|
| Siyabonga Melongisi Shibe | James |
| Salim Daw | Shimi |
| Arie Elias | Salah |
| Sandra Schonwald | Rachel |
| Hugh Masebenza | Skomboze |
| Florence Bloch | Re'uma |
| Ya'akov Ronen Morad | Police Officer |
