= Ashes to Ashes (South African TV series) =

South African telenovela

- Also known as: L'Empire des Namane
- Genre: Telenovela
- Developed by: Genna Lewis
- Written by: Bongi Ndaba; Rosa Keet; Chisanga Kabinga; Linda Bere; Genna Lewis
- Starring: Nambitha Mpumlwana; Maggie Benedict; Patrick Shai; Nyaniso Dzedze; Chumani Pan; Zenande Mfenyana; Menzi Ngubane; Tina Jaxa; Richard Lukunku
- Country of origin: South Africa
- No. of seasons: 2
- No. of episodes: 280 (from 13 March 2017)

Production
- Producers: Ntokozo Mbuli, Clive Morris, Sipho Gogotya,
- Running time: 23 minutes
- Production company: Clive Morris Productions

Ashes to Ashes is a South African telenovela that was written and developed by Genna Lewis and Rosa Keet. The show was eTV's first ever telenovela produced by Clive Morris Productions.

== Synopsis ==
Ashes to Ashes follows the successful Namanes family and their Namane Funerals business. It revolves around the secrets and sacrifices of the family. Namane Funerals is run by Selogile Namane and his wife Mandlakazi and their children Tsietsi and Monwabisi. In season one the arrival of 'long lost' relative, Rebabedi, creates conflict.

== Characters ==
- Selo Namane (Patrick Shai)
- Mandlakazi Namane (Nambitha Mpumlwana)
- Tsietsi Namane (Nyaniso Dzedze)
- Violet (Maggie Benedict)
- Monwabisi Namane (Chumani Pan)
- Rebabedi Namane (Zenande Mfenyana)
- Mickey (Craig Urbani)
- Damian (Mandla Gaduka)
- Pinky (Khanyi Mbau)
- Menzi Ngubane
- Tina Jaxa
- Nat Ramabulana
- Atandwa Kani
- Siyabonga Melongisi Shibe
- Magistrate (Mmabatho Mogomotsi)

== Broadcast ==
The show Ashes to Ashes was first aired in South Africa in 2015 on E.tv with an initial run of 104 episodes. It aired Monday to Thursdays at 8:00 pm, and was later extended to play Monday To Friday. In 2016, Ashes to Ashes was renewed for a second season of 104 episodes. The show was not renewed for a third season. The final episode of Ashes To Ashes was aired on 2 September 2016.

The Ashes to Ashes series received a French dub in 2017 and subsequently broadcast on three television networks: Afriqueplus+, Iroko+, and EASY TV RDC. Its French-language title is L'Empire des Namane (The Empire of the Namanes).

== Writers ==
- Rosa Keet
- Bongi Ndaba
- Ruth Mo Moatlhodi
- Linda Bere
- Chisanga Kabinga
- Lerato Khanye
- Mpumelelo Paul Grootboom
- Tshego Monaisa
- Gena Lewis
- Nonzi Bogatsu
- Fanyana Hlabangane
- Maggie Benedict
- Mammello Mokoena
- Duduzile Mabaso
- Salah Sabiti
- Elsabé Roux
- Cleo Moloi
- Lehasa Moloi
- Sipho Xolisa Tshapu
- Pusetso Thibedi
- Tiro Makhudu
- Makganwana Mokgolong.

== Accolades ==
The South African Film and Television Awards (Saftas)

Year	Nominee / work	Award	Result
2016	Maggie Benedict	Best Supporting Actress in Soap/Telenovela	Won
2016	Siyabonga Shibe	Best Supporting Actor-TV Soap/Telenovela	Nominated
2016	Richard Lekunku	Best Actor-TV Soap/Telenovela	Nominated
2017	Mandla Gaduka	Best Actor	Won
2017	Ashes to Ashes	Best TV Soap/Telenovela	Nominated
