= Moky Makura =

Nigerian author, journalist, actress, and businessperson

Omoba Moky Makura
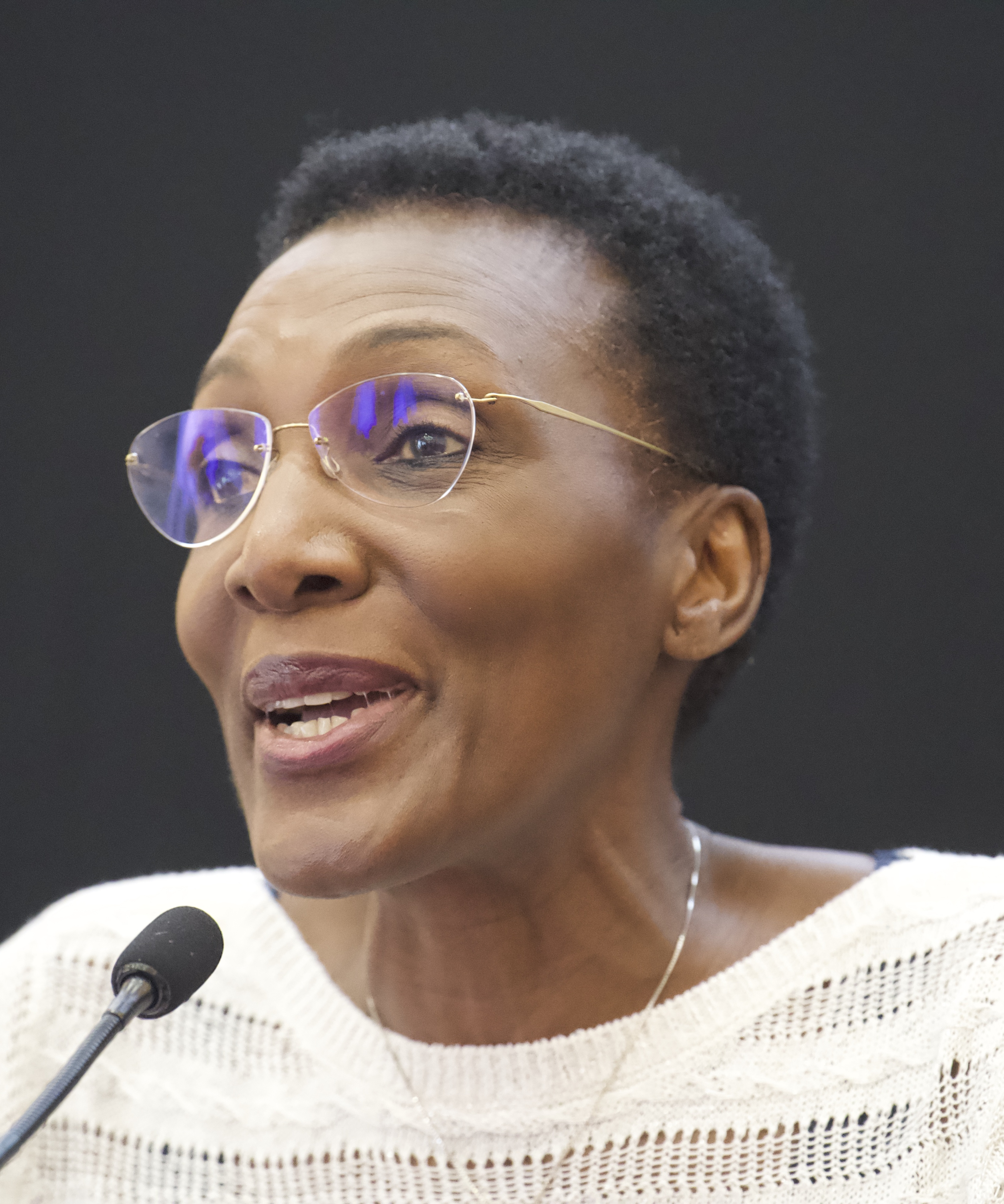
- Makura at the International Journalism Festival in 2024
- Born: Lagos state
- Citizenship: Nigerian
- Education: Degree in politics, economics, and law.
- Alma mater: University of Buckingham
- Occupations: Nigerian author, journalist, actress, and businesswoman

Moky Makura (née Jumoke Akinsemoyin) is a Nigerian author, journalist, actress, and businesswoman who serves as executive director of Africa No Filter (ANF), an organization aiming at inducing changes in Africa by means of mass media.

== Life ==
Makura was born in Lagos, Nigeria, as a member of the House of Akinsemoyin, a royal family of the Nigerian chieftaincy system. She has a degree in politics, economics, and law from the University of Buckingham. In 1998, she moved to South Africa, and in 1999, started her own consultancy company. She was deputy director for Communications Africa at the Bill & Melinda Gates Foundation, and since 2017 the representative of the Foundation in South Africa.

In March 2020, she took up a role within the not-for-profit organization Africa No Filter (ANF). She has served as Executive Director of ANF since that time.

In South Africa, she also acted on television, mainly in the Jacob's Cross drama series.

== Books ==
- Africa's Greatest Entrepreneurs, Penguin Random House (2008).
