= Oluchi =

Given name

- Gender: Unisex, though predominantly female
- Language: Igbo

Origin
- Meaning: Chi's handiwork
- Region of origin: Southeast Nigeria

Other names
- Related names: Oluchukwu

Oluchi // is a popular unisex of Igbo origin. It means “chi's handiwork”. Similarly, there is the name "Oluchukwu".

== Notable people with this name ==
- Oluchi Okananwa (born 2004), American basketball player
- Oluchi Onweagba (born 1980), Nigerian model
- Grace Oluchi Mbah (born 1994), Climate change activist
- Kendra Oluchi Etufunwa (born 1993), Nigerian model and actress
- Eucharia Oluchi Nwaichi, Nigerian environmental biochemist, soil scientist and toxicologist
- Eberechi Oluchi Eze (born 1998), English professional footballer
