= Jacob's Cross =

African prime time drama

- Genre: Drama
- Directed by: Adze Ugah, Thabang Moleya, Amanda Lane, Catherine Stewart, Neil Sundstrom
- Starring: Hlomla Dandala, Anthony Bishop, Kendra Etufunwa, Bankole Omotoso
- Countries of origin: South Africa; Nigeria
- Original language: English
- No. of seasons: 8
- No. of episodes: 104

Production
- Executive producers: Desiree Markgraaff, Angus Gibson, Teboho Mahlatsi
- Producer: Desiree Markgraaff,
- Production locations: South Africa and Nigeria
- Cinematography: Zeno Peterson
- Editor: Carl Morgan
- Running time: 90 min (2006 pilot), 46 min (2007-2013/fullseries)
- Production company: The Bomb Shelter production company

Original release
- Network: Africa Magic, SABC, M-Net
- Release: December 2006 – January 2013

Jacob's Cross is a South African-Nigerian television drama series created by Catherine Stewart. It is an M-Net original series produced by The Bomb Shelter for M-Net, and stars Hlomla Dandala, Anthony Bishop, Nandi Nyembe, Fabian Adeoye Lojede, Bankole Omotoso, Jet Novuka, Moky Makura and Mmabatho Montsho.

== Premise ==
The series revolves around South African born businessman Jacob Makhubu Abayomi (Hlomla Dandala), a son of an ANC stalwart who finds that his biological father is actually a Nigerian tribal chief. Jacob's subsequent desire to build an African oil and gas business empire in the shadow of both of his fathers is set against the backdrop of family feuds and betrayals.

== Main cast ==
- Hlomla Dandala as Chief Jacob Makhubu Abayomi
- Anthony Bishop as Mr. Prospero Brand
- Mmabatho Montsho as Mrs. Lerato Makhubu
- Nandi Nyembe as Mrs. Thembi Makhubu
- Fabian Adeoye Lojede as Mr. Bola Abayomi
- Bankole Omotoso as Chief Bankole Abayomi
- Jet Novuka as Mr. Andile Makhubu
- Moky Makura as Chief Folake Abayomi, Mrs. Soludo

== Broadcast ==
The series premiered on 25 January 2007. Premiere episodes for season 1 and 2 debuted on the defunct M-Net Series channel, making the first original series to premiere on the channel. Episodes were shown a day later on the main M-Net channel until season 3, where M-Net showed premiere episodes. The series was moved to Mzansi Magic for season 4, then Africa Magic Entertainment from season 5 onwards.

=== International broadcast ===
The series made its free-to-air debut on SABC 2. The series was later added to streaming services Showmax, Prime Video and Demand Africa.
