= Africa No Filter =

Not-for-profit organization

- Abbreviation: ANF
- Founded: March 2020; 6 years ago
- Type: Not-for-profit
- Location(s): Digital office with staff in Johannesburg, Lagos, Accra, Cape Town, Nairobi, and Kampala
- Region served: Africa and the African diaspora
- Method: Research, grant-making, and advocacy
- Executive Director: Moky Makura
- Key people: Caroline Ndosi, Yasmin Kumi, Uche Pedro, Bogolo Kenewendo, Betelhem Dessie, Sherrie Silver
- Funders: Ford Foundation, Luminate, Bloomberg, Open Society Foundations, Comic Relief, Conrad N. Hilton Foundation, Mellon Foundation, British Council
- Website: africanofilter.org/home

Africa No Filter (ANF) is a non-profit organization that works to challenge and change harmful narratives about Africa by amplifying authentic and diverse stories from the continent. The organization aims to shift perceptions and create a more balanced and nuanced understanding of Africa, countering stereotypes and misconceptions that often prevail in media and popular culture.

By supporting and promoting African voices, creativity, and innovation, Africa No Filter seeks to reshape the narrative surrounding the continent and showcase its vibrant cultures, achievements, and potential. The organization engages in various initiatives, including media campaigns, storytelling projects, research, and collaborations with artists, creators, and organizations across Africa.

ANF was established in May 2020 through a collaborative effort of donor organizations including the Ford Foundation, Bloomberg, Mellon Foundation, Luminate, Open Society Foundations, Comic Relief, the Conrad N. Hilton Foundation, and the Hewlett Foundation.

== Executive Director ==
Moky Makura is a thought leader and narrative and communications expert with more than 25 years of experience in the Communications industry. She took up her role as Executive Director of ANF in March 2020.

== Grantmaking ==
ANF grants support emerging and established artists, scholars, authors, poets, bloggers, vloggers, photographers, curators, publishers, musicians, journalists, and arts, culture and media organizations based in Africa and its diaspora who are challenging stereotypes about Africa through their work. Grants are offered directly and indirectly through intermediaries to individuals and organizations based in Africa and its diaspora.

=== Operational Support Grants ===
Operational Support Grants are open to creative hubs, narrative change organizations, media houses, festivals, galleries, digital platforms, etc., who are supporting individual storytellers. This can be through program delivery, job creation, residences, networking opportunities, training and capacity building for creatives, artists, journalists etc.

=== Capacity Building Grants ===
Capacity Building Grants support the delivery of upskilling and training projects on the continent. Funding supports individuals and organizations using traditional and new media, art, innovation, tech, and creativity to challenge stereotypical narratives about Africa.

=== Convening Grants ===
Convening Grants are open to organizations and individuals that organize forums, debates, panel discussions, and dialogues with African and African diaspora speakers – including young people and subject matter experts – to generate insights on things that shape perceptions about Africa.

== ANF research ==
Africa No Filter produces evidence-based insights on the impact of the current stereotypical narratives on the continent's development. The ANF Research Consortium consists of Facebook, AUDA-NEPAD, the African Union Commission, and The Africa Centre in New York.

=== Research reports ===
ANF's work is underpinned by continuous research on the impact of current stereotypical narratives on Africa's development. ANF reports include "How African Media Covers Africa", which surveyed 38 African editors and analyzed content from 60 African news outlets in 15 countries between September and October 2020. In addition, four facilitated focus groups were held with 25 editors of African media, editors of Pan African outlets and international correspondents. Results found that 63% of outlets surveyed did not have correspondents in other African countries, one-third of all coverage on Africa was from non-African sources, and that 81 percent of the stories analyzed were conflicts and crises. Africa No Filter launched bird – the continent's first and only news agency focusing on stories of creativity, innovation, arts and culture, and human interest – in response to findings from the report.

== Fellows programs ==
ANF also has research and arts programs that work with and support cohorts of narrative changemakers.

=== Emerging Artists Fellows Program ===
The Emerging Artists Fellows Program will provide 12 creative practitioners from across Africa with mentorship, peer-to-peer skills sharing and new networks through monthly fellow-led seminars.

== Resources for storytellers ==
The organization provides resources that include courses and handbooks, aiming to produce best practices in reporting about Africa. Notably, How to Write About Africa in 8 Steps: An Ethical Storytelling Handbook tackles implicit biases affecting development funders, the media and western storytellers, which typically "focus on a community or individual's deficit rather than their agency" and "depict development organisations as the heroes"; conversely, ethical storytelling highlights "the successes and agency of the people in the stories".
