= Sibongile Ndashe =

South African lawyer and human rights activist

- Education: B. Proc and Bachelor of Laws, University of the Western Cape
- Occupation: Lawyer
- Known for: Human rights, women's rights, and LGBTI rights campaigns

Sibongile Ndashe is a South African lawyer and human rights activist. She has been involved in public interest law since 1999 and has worked for several women's rights and human rights organisations. She founded the Initiative for Strategic Litigation in Africa (ISLA) in 2014 and has worked to help lawyers across Africa bring cases to court involving gender identity and sexual orientation. She supports the incremental decriminalisation of homosexuality. In October 2017 she was arrested in Tanzania on charges of "promoting homosexuality" whilst discussing ways to challenge a ban on HIV/AIDS treatment by private health clinics.

== Career ==
Sibongile Ndashe has been involved in public interest law since 1999. Ndashe has B. Proc and Bachelor of Laws degrees from the University of the Western Cape. She began her career as an article clerk at the Legal Resources Centre, South Africa.

In 2001 Ndashe worked under Johann Kriegler and Kate O'Regan as a research clerk at the Constitutional Court of South Africa. She was a legal adviser at the Women's Legal Centre from 2002 to 2007, where she focused on cases involving women's rights. Ndashe worked as a lawyer with the International Centre for the Legal Protection of Human Rights (Interights) between 2007 and 2013. Whilst there she worked on cases across the Southern Africa region involving human rights, discrimination and cases before the African Commission on Human and Peoples' Rights.

Ndashe founded Initiative for Strategic Litigation in Africa (ISLA) in 2014 and serves as its executive director. ISLA and Ndashe offers legal advice to lawyers from countries across Africa. She is particularly keen to support regional and domestic movements to bring cases of sexual orientation and gender identity issues before the courts and wants an incremental decriminalisation of homosexuality. Ndashe helped to establish the African LGBTI Rights Lawyers Network (ALRILaN) to assist lawyers working on such cases and has supported LGTBI cases at the African Court on Human and Peoples' Rights.

== 2017 arrest in Tanzania ==
In October 2017 Ndashe travelled to Tanzania with a South African and a Ugandan lawyer, all ISLAN members, to meet with members of the Community Health and Education Services and Advocacy (Chesa), a Tanzanian sex workers' rights organisation. They met at a hotel in Dar es Salaam to discuss how to challenge an October 2016 law banning HIV/AIDS outreach projects aimed at gay men, and the resultant closing of many Tanzanian private health clinics providing HIV/AIDS treatment. Police raided the meeting and arrested the three lawyers, nine Chesa members and the hotel manager for "promoting homosexuality", which is illegal in Tanzania. Ndashe maintained that the group had not broken any laws as the meeting was not about homosexuality but about general access to HIV/AIDS treatment; nevertheless, the group were held without charge for 10 days, well beyond the 24-hour limit in Tanzanian law. Ndashe was released and was deported to South Africa around 28 October. She intends to sue the Tanzanian government over their treatment.
