= Relebogile Mokhuoane =

South African footballer

Personal information
- Full name: Relebogile "China" Mokhuoane
- Date of birth: 8 December 1994 (age 31)
- Place of birth: Harrismith, Intabazwe
- Height: 1.77 m (5 ft 10 in)
- Position: Midfielder

Team information
- Current team: Sekhukhune United
- Number: 21

Senior career*
Years	Team	Apps	(Gls)
2017–2021	Free State Stars	57	(4)
2021–2024	Cape Town City	50	(1)
2024–	Sekhukhune United	0	(0)
- * Club domestic league appearances and goals as of 1 August 2024

Relebogile Mokhuoane (born 8 December 1994) is a South African soccer player who plays as a midfielder for South African Premier Division side Sekhukhune United.
