= Mmabatho Ramagoshi =

South African government official

Mmabatho Ramagoshi is a South African government official who holds the positions of chief executive officer of the South African Heritage Resources Agency, and Secretary-General of the International Alliance of Women. She is also chair of the board of directors of the National Film and Video Foundation, appointed by the South African government, and has a background as a Provincial General Manager at the South African Broadcasting Corporation.
