= Oddball Hall =

- Film poster
- Directed by: Jackson Hunsicker
- Screenplay by: Jackson Hunsicker
- Produced by: Alan Munro; Harry Alan Towers
- Starring: Don Ameche; Burgess Meredith
- Cinematography: Avi Karpick
- Music by: William T. Stromberg
- Production company: Ravenhill Productions
- Distributed by: Cannon Films
- Release date: April 19, 1991
- Running time: 87 minutes
- Country: United States
- Language: English

Oddball Hall is a 1991 comedy film directed by Jackson Hunsicker, who also wrote the screenplay. It stars Don Ameche, Burgess Meredith, and Bill Maynard. It was released direct-to-video and has received negative reviews from critics.

== Plot ==
Four elderly jewel thieves, on the run from the law, disguise themselves as a local chapter of the "Odd Balls" in order to hide out at an African village.

== Production ==
Oddball Hall was written and directed by Jackson Hunsicker. The film had a budget of $1.5 million. It was produced by Alan Munro and Harry Alan Towers. Oddball Hall stars Don Ameche and Burgess Meredith as the two jewel thieves. The supporting cast includes Bill Maynard, Tullio Moneta, and Tiny Skefile. Cinematography was done by Avi Karpick, and William T. Stromberg did the music.

== Release ==
Oddball Hall was released directly to video on April 19, 1991. Though it was advertised as being similar to The Gods Must Be Crazy, Sandra Brennan of AllMovie felt the two films shared little resemblance. Critical response has been negative. Film reviewer Leonard Maltin criticized Oddball Hall and gave it two stars; while he wrote that the film was good-natured and simplistic, he felt that it was not funny. Author Mick Martin, in his book Video Movie Guide, called the film a "flat comedy of mistaken identities." Kevin Thomas of The New York Times wrote that the film was "complicated" and "unfunny" despite starring Meredith and Ameche. Keith Bailey, of The Unknown Movies, wrote that "Oddball Hall is...well...odd. That may be why the major studio that picked this up never, to my knowledge, theatrically released this. Though odder is the question why they picked it up in the first place. While there are few actively bad sequences, the whole exercise is slow, uneventful, and largely unfunny."
