= Kendra Oluchi Etufunwa =

Nigerian model and actress

Kendra Divine Etufunwa
- Born: 28 June 1993 (age 32)
- Occupations: Model; Actress; Events, fashion and beauty consultant.
- Modelling information
- Height: 5 ft 10 in (1.78 m)
- Hair colour: Brown
- Eye colour: Brown/grey
- Agency: Boss models (formerly) Ice Models Worldwide; Moonyeenn Lee Associates

Kendra Oluchi Etufunwa is a Nigerian model and actress, known for her lead role on the M-Net hit TV series Jacob's Cross. She has been featured in publications such as South African Elle magazine and Glamour (SA) and modeled in advertisements for brands such as Castle Milk Stout, Pepsodent and Knorr.

In March 2012, the technology company Intel in Kenya and Nigeria appointed Etufunwa as a brand ambassador for their lifestyles' division.

== Early life ==
Kendra grew up in the city of Capetown with her mother and sister. Kendra is the daughter of a businesswoman and a retired banker. She pursued a two-year course in human resources at the London School of Business, located in Johannesburg, South Africa.

== Career ==
During the 2006 Lagos auditions for the Most Beautiful Girl in Nigeria (MBGN) pageant, she was discovered by an agent, and from there, she started her career in modeling.

She gained recognition in Nigeria's modeling industry, securing jobs for Diamond Bank and earning a spot among the 26 models featured on M-Net's Deal or No Deal TV game show. Her early print appearance was on the cover of West African magazine True Love alongside English television presenter and former footballer John Fashanu.

In October 2011, the producers of hip-hop awards invited Kendra to present an award at the "Hip-Hop" World Awards. Held in Nigeria. On May 17, 2012, Etufunwa was announced as the ambassador for the International African Hair Expo.

=== Johannesburg ===
In 2007, she relocated to Johannesburg, South Africa. She was a lead in the TV commercials; Clorets Gum, Cell C - mobile network and Knorr Cubes, Castle lite beer, Eclairs candy. She has worked on shoots for Cosmopolitan, Elle and appeared in an ad for Lacoste perfume that featured in Glamour (SA) magazine. She has walked the runway on various fashion weeks held in South Africa and around the world, Most notable in a show for UK renowned designer - Karen Millen.

=== Jacob's Cross ===
While on holiday, the producers of MNET's Jacob's Cross TV series summoned Kendra to come in for an audition to play the part and supporting role of an angelic daughter by day, and an evil temptress by night. Kendra's performance impressed the producers, and shortly after she was signed on for another season to become the lead actress.

=== Television and movie ===
Kendra caught the eye of international directors of a Discovery production, Inside Story, following the story of a young girl who falls in love and has to deal with life issues and the contraction of HIV. Inside Story was released to a South African audience in December 2011 and to an international audience in Washington, D.C., in the United States in January 2012.
