= Ra'anan Alexandrowicz =

Israeli film director and screenwriter (born 1969)

Ra'anan Alexandrowicz (Hebrew: רענן אלכסנדרוביץ'; born August 29, 1969) is a director, screenwriter and editor. He was born in Jerusalem. He is known for the documentary The Law in These Parts (2011), for which he received the Grand Jury Award at the Sundance Film Festival, a Peabody award, and other prizes.

His earlier documentaries, The Inner Tour (2001) and Martin (1999), were shown in the Berlin Film Festival's Forum section and MoMA's New Directors / New Films series. Alexandrowicz's single fiction feature, James' Journey to Jerusalem (2003), premiered in Cannes Directors' Fortnight and at the Toronto International Film Festival and received several international awards. He also directed the 2019 documentary film The Viewing Booth.

== Education ==
Alexandrowicz is a graduate of the Sam Spiegel Film and Television School in Jerusalem. His graduation short film Rak B'Mikrim Bodedim (1996, English title: Self Confidence Ltd) won awards at festivals of Kraków (Bronze Dinosaur Award, "3rd Międzynarodowy Festiwal Filmowy Etiuda&Anima", 13 – 16 November 1996) and Łódź.

== Career ==
In film school, Alexandrowicz focused on fiction filmmaking, but on a trip to a film festival in Germany he met a man named Martin, who had survived the Dachau concentration camp and had remained to live in the town of Dachau for the rest of his life. Along with a small crew, Alexandrowicz filmed the man for a few days. Over the following two and a half years, Alexandrowicz edited the footage. In 1999 he released the documentary Martin. The film deals with the discrepancy between memory and commemoration and the disparity between first generation and third generation Holocaust survivors. The film premiered in Jerusalem, where it won the Wolgin Prize, in Berlin, and in New York, and is part of the MOMA permanent collection.

In 1998, Alexandrowicz began to spend time in the Palestinian Occupied Territories and Gaza, doing research for a documentary about the Israeli detention camp for Palestinian political prisoners, K’Ziot. The documentary fell through, but the stories he had heard during his research stayed with him and he began to think about creating a movie that would speak to Israelis about the Palestinian experience and would tell of different perspectives on the Oslo "peace process".

In 2001 he directed the documentary 'The Inner Tour', which follows a three-day trip of a group of Palestinians from Israeli territories. Filmed just a few months before the out-break of the second Intifada in 2000, 'The Inner Tour' is a road movie which portrays the story of a group of Palestinians, who join a three day sight-seeing bus tour through the state of Israel. Released in the midst of the second Intifada, the film created controversy in Israel but was eventually screened on Israeli television. Outside Israel, The Inner Tour was screened in film festivals including the Berlin Film Festival, Sundance Film Festival, New Directors/ New Films, Hot Docs and IDFA.

In 2003 he wrote and directed the full-length feature film James' Journey to Jerusalem in the series "Geography Lesson", that premiered in Cannes' 'Directors’ Fortnight' and at the Toronto International Film Festival and received several international awards.

Alexandrowicz has an ongoing collaboration with composer and singer Ehud Banai, who won the Ophir Award for music for James' Journey to Jerusalem. He has directed music videos for Ehud Banai.

In 2003 Alexandrowicz joined Taayush, a grassroots volunteer network of Palestinians and Israelis to counter Israeli nationalist reactions aroused by the Second Intifada. In his work The Law in These Parts, Alexandrowicz set out to explore the question ‘How can a modern democracy impose a prolonged military occupation on another people while retaining its core democratic values?’. The film is based on over 5 years of research of military court files, which Alexandrowicz translates into film by creating a cinematic courtroom. The film brought together interviews with the military judges, heads of the Military Advocate General, headed by Meir Shamgar as a Judge Advocate General in 1967 designed the legal infrastructure of the military rule, images of legal files, and historical footage that show the enactment of these laws upon the Palestinian population.

The film won the Best Documentary Prize, the Van Leer Institute in Jerusalem Film Festival and the Jury Prize for Best Documentary at the Sundance Film Festival. At the Hot Docs Canadian International Documentary Festival, The Law in These Parts won the "Special Jury Prize – International Feature"; in 2013 Alexandrowicz received the Peabody award.

In 2019, after relocating to Philadelphia, Alexandrowicz co-wrote and co-produced The Viewing Booth, a documentary exploring how viewers interpret nonfiction images through the lens of their existing beliefs. The film emerged from a project conducted at Temple University in 2017, in which seven students were filmed while viewing videos concerning the Israeli occupation of the Palestinian territories. Alexandrowicz assembled forty videos—half distributed by the Israeli human rights organization B’Tselem and half by conservative organizations supporting the occupation—in an effort to present participants with opposing perspectives. The completed film centers on Maia Levy, a Jewish American college student whose willingness to engage openly with the material led Alexandrowicz to select her viewing session as its principal case study.

Following its premier at Docaviv in 2019, The Viewing Booth screened at the 70th Berlin International Film Festival and the True/False Film Fest in Columbia, Missouri, in 2020. The film received critical acclaim for its distinctive approach to documentary filmmaking and its examination of perception in the digital age, with Rolling Stone calling it "one of the most vital documentaries of the year" and others lauding its ability to reveal the complexities and limitations of witnessing itself.

Alongside his filmmaking, Alexandrowicz has pursued research on the political and historical role of moving images. In a 2018 chapter, “50 Years of Documentation: A Brief History of the Audiovisual Documentation of the Israeli Occupation,” he examined footage produced in Hebron over five decades and considered how audiovisual documentation both represents and shapes understandings of the occupation. He subsequently developed 1 Land 2 Cinemas, a research project examining the parallel histories of Israeli and Palestinian cinema and asking whether cinema merely reflects the conflict or also contributes to shaping it. He pursued the project as a fellow at the University of Pennsylvania’s Center for Experimental Ethnography in 2024 and during a research fellowship at Goethe University Frankfurt in 2025.
