= Mmabatho Montsho =

South African artist

- Born: 19 October 1983 (age 42); Soweto, Johannesburg
- Education: University of South Africa
- Occupations: fine artist, writer, actress and film director
- Years active: 2006-present

Mmabatho Montsho (born 19 October 1983) is a South African fine artist, writer, actress, and film director.

== Biography ==
Montsho was born in Soweto, Johannesburg. She had her senior high school education at Greenside High School and then furthered at the University of South Africa where she studied Audiovisual Multimedia.

While in senior high school, Montsho was interested in Fashion. She launched her very first label Black Olive Designs after completing high school. She collaborated with her close high school friends to grow the business by designing clothes and selling them at B&B Rooftop market. In 2004, their clothing line earned public recognition at the South African fashion week.

In 2006, she began her acting career, appearing as a guest on SABC 1's A Place Called Home.

== Filmography ==
She has starred in several movies and television series, including:

- Jacob's Cross
- Happiness Is a Four-letter Word
- Artcha
- Mr Bones 2: Back from the future as Wanita
- Plein Street
- Tempy Pushas as Noxy
- Nothing for Mahala
- Thula's Vine
- Generations as Lumka
- Rhythm City
- A Place Called Home as Tumi

== Works ==
She is the producer and director for the following movies:

- Frontières
- The Award Ceremony
- Joko Ya Hao
- Nothing for Mahala
- A hotel Called Memory

== Awards ==
- Awarded Golden Horn Award for Best Achievement in Script in a TV Drama
- 2020 - Best Short Film - Worldwide Women's Film Festival in Arizona
