= Fumani Shilubana =

South African actor

Fumani N Shilubana
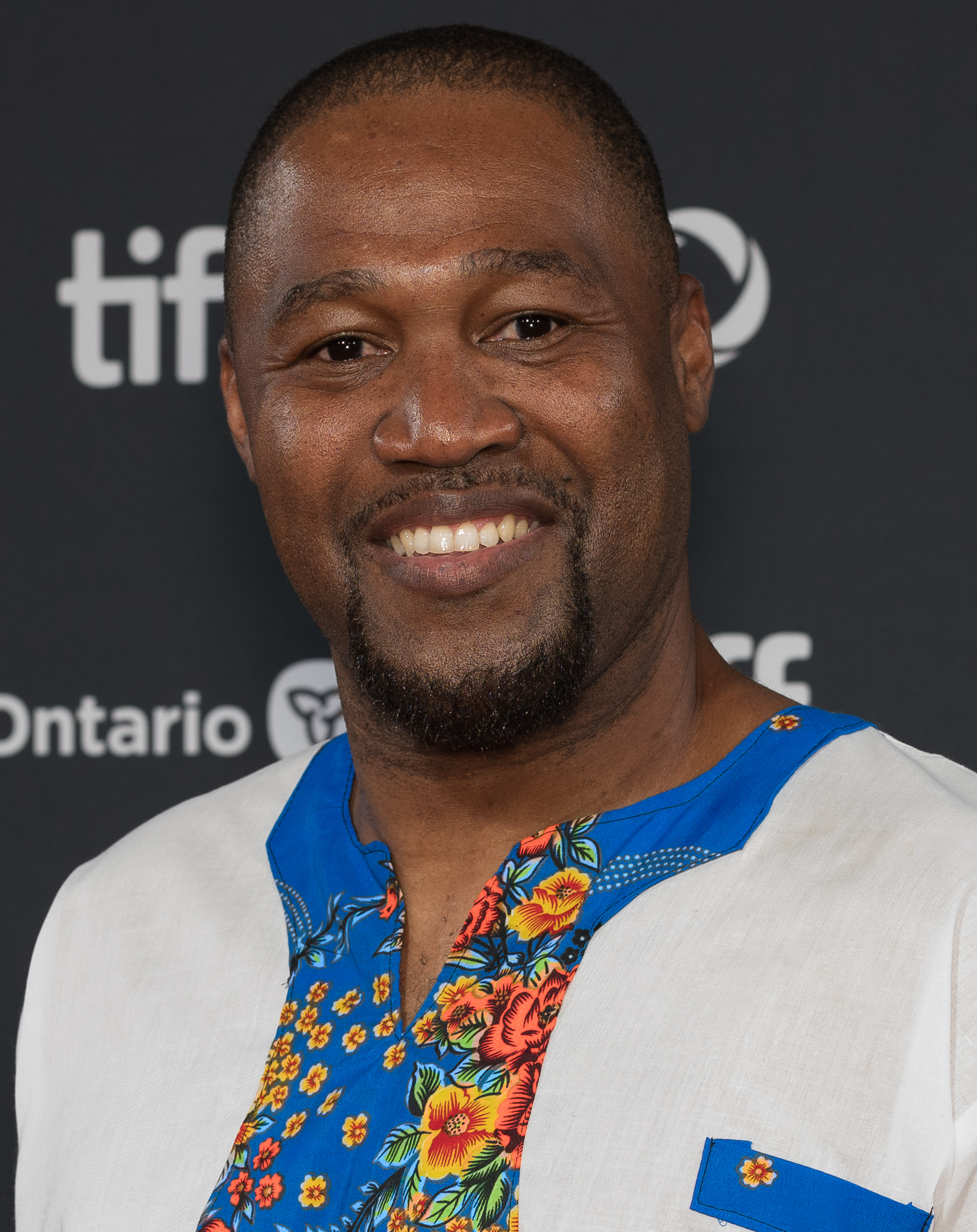
- Shilubana at the 2024 Toronto International Film Festival
- Born: Fumani Nkateko Shilubana; 22 March 1980 (age 46); Tzaneen, South Africa
- Education: Mathews Phosa College
- Alma mater: The IIE's Varsity College - Sandton
- Occupations: Media executive, producer, Casting director, Voice artist, and actor
- Years active: 2001–present
- Organization(s): Shilubana Capital Holdings, TSAIMA
- Known for: Filmmaker and Founder of FatherFigureZA
- Height: 1.91 m (6 ft 3 in)
- Title: Chairman and COO of Shilubana Capital Holdings
- Relatives: Hosi Muhlava I (Great grand father)
- Awards: Mama Beka Community Award, 365 Men of the Year 2021, Nkuna Royal House Award, RaisingLegends Award
- Website: https://shilch.co.za/

Fumani N. Shilubana (born 22 March 1980) is a South African media executive, producer, and actor. He currently serves as the chairman and chief operating officer (COO) of Shilubana Capital Holdings, a diversified investment firm with interests in media production, private transfers, agriculture, and logistics. He is also the co-founder of The South African Icon Mogul Awards (TSAIMA).

Throughout his career, Shilubana has appeared in several high-profile international productions. He worked alongside Academy Award winners Charlize Theron and Javier Bardem in the 2016 drama The Last Face, directed by Sean Penn. In 2019, he featured in the first season of the Amazon Prime/BBC fantasy series Good Omens. Most recently, he starred as Jacob in the 2024 film Don't Let's Go to the Dogs Tonight, directed by Embeth Davidtz, which premiered at the Telluride Film Festival and Toronto International Film Festival.

In addition to his international work, Shilubana is well-known for his roles in South African cinema, including Zama Zama, My Father's War, and Kalushi: The Story of Solomon Mahlangu. He is a prominent advocate for fatherhood and intentional parenting as the founder of FatherFigureZA, a non-profit organization focused on family unity. He was also a pioneer in Xitsonga-language media, having previously launched the indigenous news bulletin Yerhu News in 2022.

== Early life ==
Born on 22 March 1980 in Shiluvana, Tzaneen, Limpopo, South Africa, Shilubana was delivered at Douglas Smith Hospital, a missionary facility in his village. His birth was complicated by the umbilical cord being wrapped around his neck, resulting in early speech difficulties that he later overcame through intensive training in Speech and Drama.

His father, Clifford Shilubana, served as the school headmaster at Mlungisi Primary School, while his mother, Nsatimuni Mundhlovu—a Mozambican-South African—worked as a nurse at Shiluvana Hospital. Shilubana's maternal lineage traces back to Magudu, Mozambique; he is the great-grandson of Pontia Mundhlovu and the grandson of Abilio Pontia Mundhlovu and Anah Musirindzi Nkovana.

Paternally, Shilubana is a direct descendant of the Nkuna royal house. He is the great-grandson of Dududu Shilubana, the younger brother of Hosi Muhlava I (Muhlava Shilubana). Dududu was married to Nhunguti as his first wife. Shilubana is the grandson of John Magutsu Shilubana— who was married to Asnat Ntsanwisi. He has two younger sisters, Labani Mgimeti and Kumani Shilubana, and an older brother, Tebogo Maake.

== Personal life ==
=== Family and Advocacy ===
Shilubana is a dedicated father of three children: Vulani Pontia, Nganakati-Nsuku, and Fumani Nkateko Shilubana. Beyond his professional career, he is a prominent advocate for intentional fatherhood and family unity. He served as a columnist for the national magazine Mamas and Papas, where he authored a dedicated column titled "Deconstruct to Construct," focusing on the evolving role of fathers in modern South African society. He is also the founder of FatherFigureZA, a non-profit organization focused on mentorship and restoring the presence of father figures in local communities.

=== Education and Early Athletics ===
Shilubana matriculated in 1998 at Mathews Phosa College in Mpumalanga. His early academic journey was characterized by a search for his professional calling; he initially enrolled at the University of Venda in 1999 to study for a Bachelor of Science (BSc) in Agriculture, and later in 2000 for Industrial Engineering at the Tshwane University of Technology. He ultimately chose to pivot toward the arts, enrolling in the Speech and Drama Program at the South African State Theatre under the mentorship of acclaimed playwright and director Mpumelelo Paul Grootboom.

In his youth, Shilubana was a versatile athlete. He began playing basketball at age 15, teaching himself the technicalities of the sport through a rule book provided by his mother. By age 19, his proficiency led to his selection for the University of Limpopo trials, where he was chosen to represent the Limpopo Province senior men's team at the SASSU games in Cape Town. Additionally, he served as the first-choice goalkeeper for his high school soccer team and soccer team at the University of Venda, demonstrating early leadership and defensive capabilities on the field.

== "No Get Off" and Cultural Advocacy ==
In 2026, Shilubana wrote and composed the World Cup African football anthem "No Get Off", performed by Soul Da Southa featuring Mr Seven Keys and N’wa Khambani. The song was released on the 8th May 2026 during the build-up to the 2026 FIFA World Cup and was inspired by the historic expansion of African representation at the tournament, with the Confederation of African Football (CAF) receiving nine guaranteed qualification spots and one intercontinental playoff opportunity for the first time in FIFA World Cup history.

The title "No Get Off", derived from West African pidgin English, translates loosely to "we are here to stay" or "we are not leaving". According to Shilubana, the song was conceived as a celebration of African progress in global football and as a response to the continent’s historical underrepresentation at previous FIFA World Cups.

The multilingual anthem incorporates English, Pidgin English, French, Arabic, Wolof, Twi, Xitsonga and Nguni linguistic influences, reflecting cultural unity across the African continent. The song references both African football legends and current and active players, including Roger Milla, George Weah, Jay-Jay Okocha, Nwankwo Kanu, Lucas Radebe, Didier Drogba, Riyad Mahrez, Mohamed Salah, Achraf Hakimi, Sadio Mané and Relebohile Mofokeng.

Following its release, "No Get Off" was promoted through a national radio and digital campaign that included interviews on Capricorn FM, Power 98.7, SAFM and other South African radio platforms, alongside school activations, football-themed social media campaigns and community outreach initiatives.

The song was distributed on major streaming platforms including Apple Music and Spotify.

== Career ==
=== 2000–2004: The Genesis and "The Star Search" ===
In late 2000, Shilubana entered a modeling competition at Tzaneen Mall, leading to his selection as one of 20 finalists nationwide to train in Italy. While preparing for the international trip, a chance encounter at the South African State Theatre with drama facilitator Irene Mathe led to his first casting in a stage play. Despite initial pressure to continue his studies in Industrial Engineering, Shilubana committed to the arts, earning a speech and drama certificate while supporting himself as a waiter.

Between 2002 and 2004, he transitioned to professional acting under the mentorship of Paul Grootboom at the State Theatre. Alongside peers such as Presley Chweneyagae and Zenzo Ngqobe, he underwent rigorous classical training, performing in Shakespearean works and workshopping original South African plays, including the critically acclaimed Relativity: Township Stories.

=== 2005–2010: Professional Breakthroughs and International Tours ===
By the fourth year of his training, the program began integrating professional actors into their productions, allowing young actors like Shilubana to learn from seasoned industry professionals. This exposure led to Shilubana securing representation with Stark Raving Management.

In 2005, Relativity: Township Stories—co-written and directed by Mpumelelo Paul Grootboom—opened at the National Arts Festival to critical acclaim. Shilubana's performance as "Rocks" earned him a Naledi Theatre Award nomination for Best Supporting Actor in 2006. This production marked the beginning of a prolific international touring period for Shilubana. Under Grootboom's direction, he toured the United Kingdom and the Netherlands with Township Stories in 2006.

In 2007, he toured Belgium with the production Telling Stories. This was followed by the controversial production of Cards, which featured provocative themes and toured internationally. Between 2009 and 2010, Shilubana toured Germany, the Netherlands, and the UK again with the production Welcome to Rocksburg. These international tours established Shilubana as a versatile performer capable of handling the gritty, "Township Tarantino" style for which Grootboom became famous.

Throughout this period, Shilubana balanced global stage performances with local television roles, including appearances in Hillside, Soul City, and Death of a Queen. His relentless pursuit of excellence culminated in 2009 with his casting in Generations, where a script error led to him performing in his native Xitsonga for the first time on a major soap opera, marking a significant turning point for indigenous language representation in South African media.

=== 2011–2019: Television Stardom and Casting Leadership ===
Shilubana gained widespread fame for his role as Detective Dabula in the SABC3 soap opera Isidingo (2011–2013). In 2019, he took on a dual role for the first Xitsonga telenovela, Giyani: Land of Blood; in addition to starring as Vukosi Moyo, he served as a key member of the production's casting team, helping to shape the show's ensemble.

His international film career also flourished during this time, appearing in The Last Face (2016), directed by Sean Penn, and the Amazon Prime/BBC series Good Omens (2019).

=== 2020–present: Executive Leadership and Directorial Expansion ===
In late 2019, Shilubana co-founded Xiculu Multimedia, shifting his focus toward executive production. In 2022, he served as the Casting Director and Co-Producer on a five-film slate for Mzansi Magic, produced by Shitshembiso Mabasa.

His directorial career expanded further in 2024 with the release of two Mzansi Magic films, Aus' Wa Magwinya and Ziphi Nkomo. He also wrote and directed the independent feature The Weight of Rirhandxu under his banner, Shiluva Film Studio. During this same period, he received international acclaim for his role as Jacob in the film Don't Let's Go to the Dogs Tonight, directed by Embeth Davidtz, which premiered at the Toronto International Film Festival (TIFF).

In 2026, Shilubana joined the cast of the e.tv soap opera Scandal! in the role of Vukosi Chauke, a character involved in a high-stakes redemption-focused storyline.

Shilubana currently serves as the chairman and chief operating officer (COO) of Shilubana Capital Holdings and is the co-founder of The South African Icon Mogul Awards (TSAIMA).

In September 2026,Shilubana’s film “The Weight of Rirhandzu” produced by Shiluva Film Studios, was screened at the inaugural African Languages International Film Festival (ALIFF), held at the Unisa Little Theatre in Tshwane. The festival was established as a platform for films produced in African languages and for the promotion of African languages in cinema.

“The Weight of Rirhandzu” received awards at the festival: Best use of Language, Best Story, Best Cinematography and Best Film of the Festival. The film was written, produced and directed by Shilubana and was filmed in the Tzaneen area of Limpopo, including Nkowankowa and Muhlava Village.

=== Voiceover and Commercials ===
Shilubana has maintained an extensive career as a commercial brand ambassador and voice artist, representing major industrial and corporate entities. Between 2005 and 2024, he appeared in high-profile national and international television campaigns. Notably, he led major campaigns for the technology conglomerate Altron (2020) and the global hospitality leader Marriott International (2023–2024).

His commercial portfolio also includes prominent roles in advertisements for Hyundai, Capitec, Cremora, Hippo, and Spekko Rice. As a voice artist, his work is highly regarded in the financial and public sectors, having voiced campaigns and dramatic series for ABSA, Standard Bank, FNB, and the South African National Roads Agency (SANRAL). He has also been a consistent voice for the Government Communications and Information System (GCIS) and the Soul City Institute, further establishing his status as a trusted voice in South African media.

== Awards and nominations ==
Shilubana's career is characterized by a dual recognition for his artistic excellence and his contributions as a social entrepreneur and community advocate.

=== Artistic recognition ===
Shilubana received his first major critical acclaim in 2005 when he was nominated for a Naledi Theatre Award for Best Supporting Actor for his role as "Rocks" in Relativity: Township Stories. In 2016, he received his first screen acting nomination for Best Actor for his performance in Love Specialist at the F.A.M.E Awards.

=== Social Entrepreneurship and Leadership ===
In addition to his film career, Shilubana is a prominent figure in South African social development, focusing on family restoration and community empowerment. In 2021, he was honored with the **365Man of the Year Award** by the Gauteng Department of Social Development, recognizing his consistent work in promoting positive masculinity and social cohesion.

In 2024, his contributions to community development were further acknowledged with the **Raising Legend Award** from the Hope Givers Foundation. This honor recognized his leadership in mentoring the next generation and his impact as a social innovator through platforms such as FatherFigureZA and TSAIMA.

== Stage ==
Year(s)	Production	Theater	Role(s)
2001	Talk Of the Town	South African State Theatre	Thug
2001	Vukani Ma Africa	South African State Theatre	Detective
2003	Julius Caesar	South African State Theatre	Julius Caesar; Citizen; RomanSoldier
2003	Hamlet	South African State Theatre	Ghost; Gravedigger; Player King
2003	In This Life	South African State Theatre	Detective Rocks; Tarven Drunk; Lovemore
2005	Heartbeat	South African State Theatre	Wizard
2005/6	Relativity "township stories"	National Arts Festival, South African State Theatre, The Market Theatre, Vienna Tour	Rocks
2005/6	Cards	South African State Theatre, The Market Theatre	Leo Chauke
2007	Cards	Sand du Plessis Theatre, Windybrow Centre	Mubara
2007	Telling Stories	South African State Theatre, Belgium Tour	Madi's Father
2008	Julius Caesar	Sibikwa Arts Centre	Cassius
2008	Of Cats And Dogs	Windybrow Centre	Thabang
2009	Interacial	National Arts Festival, Poland Tour	Gert
2010	Cards	South African State Theatre	Assistant director
2009/10	Welcome To Rocksburg	South African State Theatre, Netherlands and UK Tour, Germany Tour	Detective
2013	The Good Candidate	Artscape Theatre Centre	Candidate

== Filmography ==
Year	Film	Role	Genre	Ref.
2006	Hillside Season 1	Detective Nataniel	TV series	
2006	Soul City Season 7	Dumisani	TV series	
2006	Flashes From A Township Life	Madala	Short film	
2007	Death of a Queen Season 1	Tsaroga	TV series	
2008	Hillside Season 2	Detective Nataniel	TV series	
2009	Generations – Season 1	Dr Mokhethi	Soap Opera	
2010	Muvhango	Advocate Molale	Soap Opera	
2010	eKasi: Our Stories – Season 2	Emmanuel	TV movie	
2011	Ga Re Dumele – Season 2	Mayor	Sitcom	
2011–13	Isidingo	Detective Dabula	Soap Opera	
2012	Over My Dead Body	Svara Makoti	TV movie	
2012	Zama Zama	Babylon	Film	
2013	Mj Records	Producer	Sitcom	
2013	Naledi	Lebohang	TV Series	
2013	Regrets	Simon	TV movie	
2013	Skeem Saam 2	Ntsako	Soap Opera	
2013	High Rollers	Joe	TV series	
2013	Let Heaven Wait	Mountain	Sitcom	
2013	Mzansi Love	Chief	TV movie	
2014	Thola 1	Rudzani Makwarela	TV series	
2015	The Message	Nkosi	TV movie	
2015	Zabalaza (2013) – Season 3	Official	Telenovela	
2015	The Mayor	Lead Investor	TV series	
2016	The Last Face	Uncredited	Film	
2016	Kalushi: The Story of Solomon Mahlangu	Lucas Mahlangu	Film	
2016	My Father's War	Floyd	Film	
2016	Sokhulu & Partners	Ndumiso Mthunzi	TV series	
2016	Isibaya Season 3	Doctor	Telenovela	
2016	Sounds of Silence	Joe Mazo	Short film	
2016	The Last Tango	Kalala	Short film	
2016	One Hundred Lives	Constable Mamabolo	Short film	
2017	Thola 2	Rudzani Makwarela	TV series	
2017	Saints and Sinners	Zwelethu	TV series	
2017	Z'bondiwe – Season 3 (The Chase)	Vinnie	TV series	
2017	Bone of My Bones	Detective Maswanganyi	TV series	
2017	End of The Line	Samuel	Short film	
2018	Guilt	Ezekiel Mokgopa	TV series	
2018	Isithembiso Season 1	Mr Mboweni	Telenovela	
2019	Giyani: Land of Blood	Vukosi Moyo	Telenovela	
2019	Good Omens	Uncredited	TV series	
2020	Mafanato 1	Percy Hlungwane	TV series	
2020	Five Tiger	Melusi	Short film	
2023	Shaka Ilembe	Nduku	TV series	
2024	Rivoningo	Rivoningo's father	TV movie	
2024	The Drop	Detective Ndlovu	Film	
2024	uSlim Nesonto	Bra Clive	Film	
2024	Don't Let's Go to the Dogs Tonight	Jacob	Film	
2025	Go!	Langa	TV series	
2026	The Weight of Rirhandzu	Business Owner	Film	
2026	Scandal!	Vukosi Chauke	Soap Opera	

== Film work ==
Year	Film						Note
Year	Film	Director	Writer	Producer	Actor	Creator	Note
2016	Khomelela	Yes	Yes	Yes	No	Yes	
2016	Straight to the Point	Yes	Yes	Yes	No	Yes	
2020	Mafanato	Yes	No	Yes	Yes	No	
2020	Minkoka Mimbiri	Yes	No	Yes	No	No	
2022	Timbita Ta Levuxeni:JUSTICIA	Yes	No	Yes	No	Yes	
2025	Aus' Wa Magwinya	Yes	Yes	Yes	Yes	Yes	
2025	Ziph' Nkomo	Yes	No	No	No	No	
TBA	The Weight of Rirhandzu	Yes	Yes	Yes	Yes	Yes	
TBA	Raising From The Ashes	Yes	Yes	Yes	No	Yes	
TBA	Under The Same Sky	Yes	Yes	Yes	No	Yes	
