= Queen Modjadji =

South African drama television series

- Genre: Cultural drama
- Created by: Duma Ndlovu
- Written by: Duma Ndlovu; Sydney Dire; Phathutshedzo Makwarela
- Directed by: Zeno Petersen; Thuli Zuma
- Starring: Makoma Mohale; Masutang Hope Rasekele; Wiseman Zitha; Ngelekanyo Ramulondi; Helen Lebepe; Thabo Bopape; Putla Sehlapelo; Shudufhadzo Musida; Ndavi Nokeri; Candy Tsa Mandebele
- Country of origin: South Africa
- Original languages: Khelobedu; Pedi; Tsonga; Venda
- No. of seasons: 1
- No. of episodes: 13

Production
- Executive producers: Duma Ndlovu; Sydney Dire
- Producer: Word of Mouth Productions
- Camera setup: Multi-camera
- Running time: 50–54 minutes

Original release
- Network: Mzansi Magic
- Release: 14 July – 29 September 2024

Queen Modjadji is a Mzansi Magic historical drama series, premiering on 14 July 2024, that brings to life the untold story of the legendary Balobedu rainmaking queen and her enduring legacy in Limpopo. Inspired by the first Rain Queen, Maselekwane Modjadji. The show was produced by Duma Ndlovu of the Rhythm World Productions and features a talented cast, including Makoma Mohale, Wiseman Zitha, Shudufhadzo Musida, Ndavi Nokeri, Candy Tsa Mandebele and more.

== Premise ==
Queen Modjadji is a historical drama series that tells the story of the legendary Balobedu rainmaker, the first Queen Modjadji whose bloodline has ruled the Lobedu clan in Limpopo, South Africa for centuries. The series focuses on the origins of this matriarchal dynasty highlighting the rise of the first Queen from a princess banished amidst scandal to a powerful leader believed to hold sacred rainmaking powers.

== Cast ==
=== Main cast ===
- Makoma Mohale as Maselekwani
  - Ngelekanyo Ramulondi as Young Maselekwani
- Masutang Hope Rasekele as Dzugudini
- Wiseman Zitha as Mamaila
- Thabo Bopape as Mambo Mugodu
- Helen Lebepe as Raisibe
  - Priscilla Raboroko as Young Raisibe
- Putla Sehlapelo as Ramulodi
- Shudufhadzo Musida as Muthanoni Mulalo
- Ndavi Nokeri as Muthanoni Khensani
- Candy Tsa Mandebele as Muyahabo

=== Supporting cast ===
- Maumela Mahuwa as Kheyale
- Mudi Mudau as Khadikhulu
- Moses Rasekele as Mphabantshi
- Aubrey Mmakola Kgoshi Mampuru
- Sipho Ndlovu as Phaahla
- Lesley Musina as Leitlho
- Tebatso Mashishi as Dabedi
- Nyeleti Ndubane asThuri

== Production ==
Queen Modjadji was commissioned by MultiChoice and premiered on Mzansi Magic on 14 July 2024. The series was developed by Rhythm World Productions and led by executive producers Duma Ndlovu and Sydney Dire. The main cast is led by Makoma Mohale as the Rain Queen Modjadji (Maselekwani), alongside Ngelekanyo Ramulodi as the young Queen Modjadji, and other key cast members include Wiseman Zitha, Thabo Bopape, Masutang Rasekele, Helen Lebepe and former Miss South Africa winners Shudufhadzo Musida and Ndavi Nokeri.

== Release ==
The series premiered on Mzansi Magic from 14 July to 29 September 2024, airing only in Sundays at 20:00-21:00.

== See also ==
- Mokope Modjadji
- Rain Queen
