= Michael Raeburn =

Zimbabwean film director (born 1943 or 1948)

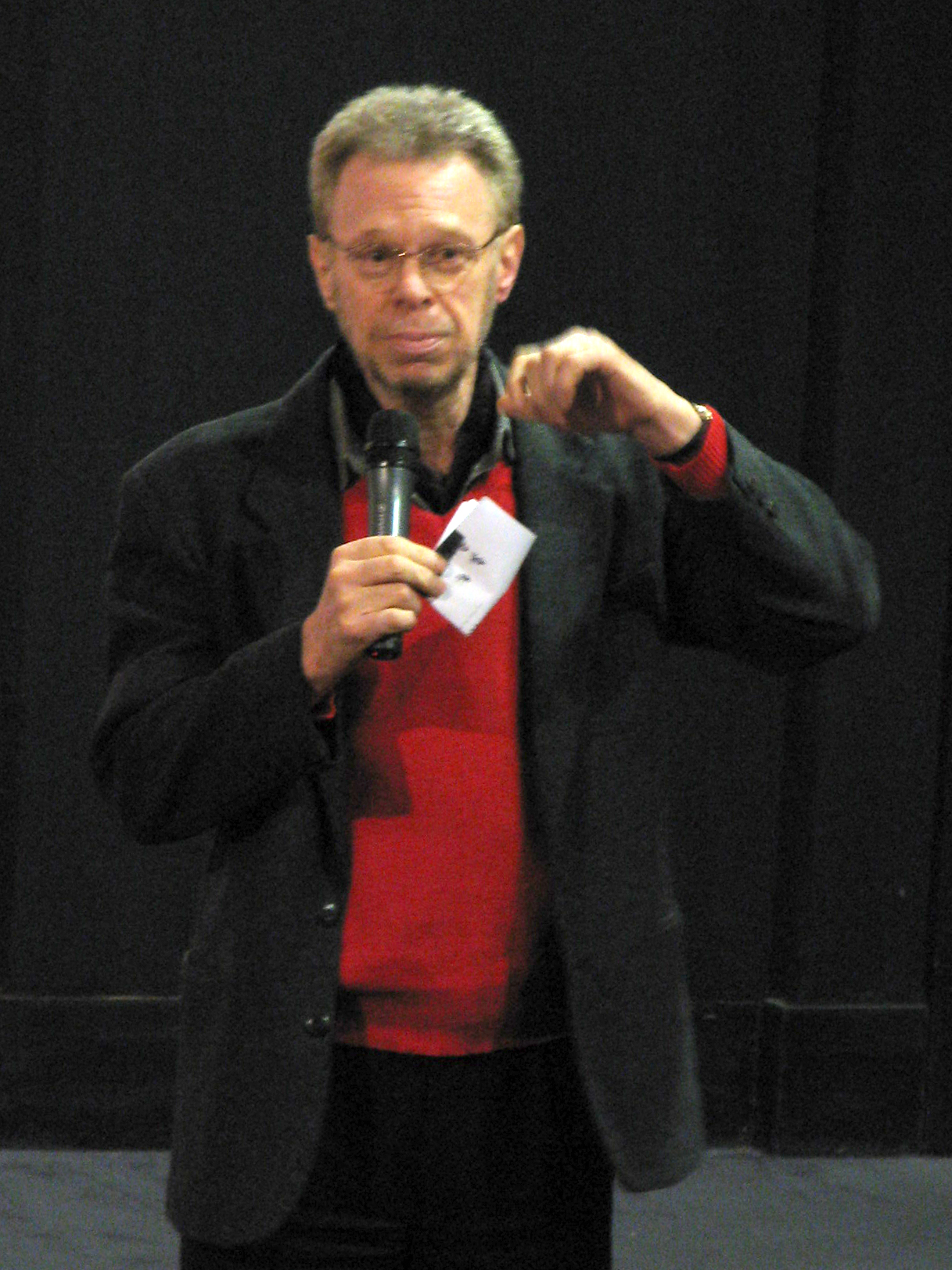
- Born: 22 January 1943 or 1948; Cairo, Egypt
- Education: University of Rhodesia, University of London; University of Aix-en-Provence
- Occupation: Filmmaker

Michael Raeburn (22 January 1943 or 1948) is a Zimbabwean filmmaker.

== Life ==
Raeburn's mother was partly Egyptian and his father was British. Born in Cairo, Egypt, Raeburn lived in Rhodesia from the age of three. He studied at the University of Rhodesia, University of London and University of Aix-en-Provence.

After making his satirical 1969 film Rhodesia Countdown (Directors' Fortnight, Cannes), he was declared a prohibited immigrant in Rhodesia, and spent twelve years in exile.

Living in London, England, Raeburn met James Baldwin in 1974. The pair became friends, and on-off lovers, and in 1977 began working together on a movie adaptation of Baldwin's novel Giovanni's Room. Marlon Brando agreed to play the part of Guillaume, and Robert De Niro also showed interest in the project. At Baldwin's 53rd birthday in 1977, guests were told that the film was going to be made. However, Raeburn eventually gave up the project, frustrated at financial demands made by Baldwin's agent.

== Films ==
- Rhodesia Countdown, 1969, Vaughan-Rogosin Films. Directors' Fortnight - Cannes; Peace prize - Mannheim; London International Film Festival
- The Plastic Shamrock, 1970, Vaughan-Rogosin Films / WDR Cologne. Ireland's industrial revolution in the 1960s.
- Ireland Behind The Wire, 1973, Berwick Street Cooperative.
- Beyond The Plains Where Man Was Born, 1976, Signfour Films/7 Productions. A Maasai tells the story of his life. London International Festival; Sydney Film Festival.
- Requiem For A Village, 1975 (producer), London International Film Festival.
- The Life of Henry Cotton, 1976, ATV. Narrated by Sean Connery.
- Sunday Sweet Sunday, 1978, Westward TV. Series on "The Sunday Lunch" in different countries, among different classes.
- The Grass Is Singing, aka USA Killing Heat, 1980, Chibote Ltd/Swedish Film Institute. Based on the novel by Doris Lessing. Camera: Bille August. Starring: Karen Black, John Thaw, John Kani. Leonard Maltin's Guide *** London International Film Festival; Toronto FF; San Francisco Film Festival; Sydney Film Festival.
- Soweto, 1988, Goldcrest Films/GEI/Skandia/NTA. Music: Hugh Masekela, Stimela and the ANC Choir. Camera: Dick Pope. Starring: Sam Williams, Dambiza Kente, Sophie Mxhina. Romeo and Juliet story set during the 1976 riots in Soweto. Filmed in Nigeria and Zimbabwe.
- Under Africa Skies, 1988, BBC/Island Records. Series on African music in Zimbabwe, Ethiopia, Mali, Algeria.
- Jit, 1990, Film Africa/Gavin Films.Virgin Records. Romantic comedy set in Zimbabwe. MOMA: New York-New Directors; Fespaco "Best cinematography"; Amiens "Best actor".
- Winds Of Rage, aka Vent de Colère, 1998. British Screen/The Works/France 3. A peasant farmer, unable to adapt to a changing world, kills himself. His daughter turns the farm around. Camera: Chris Seager. Starring: Patrick Bouchitey, Coraly Zahonero, Bernadette Lafont.
- Home Sweet Home, 1999, Lizard Films France-New York. An experimental film about childhood memories shot on DV8 blown to 35mm. Cannes Film Festival- ACDO "Académie Du Documentaire"; Festival Africano di Milano "Premio C.E.I"; Vue d'Afrique, Montréal; Cinéma du Réel, Paris; Int. Festival of Gotteborg.
- Zimbabwe Countdown aka Zimbabwe: de la Libération au Chaos 2003. Arte France. 1st Prize African Film Festival Milan 2003; 1st Prize "Beyond Borders" Clermont Ferrand; London Film Festival double bill with Rhodesia Countdown; Prix Italia, Catania Int. Festival; Cape Town World Cinema, "Signis International Jury Award"; Etats Généraux du Documentaire, France.
- Melvyn The Magnificent, aka Let's Hit The Streets, 2005. FMC-France/SABC. Among the gangs during the Cape Town Carnival.
- Triomf, 2008 GH Films, France/Giraffe, South Africa. Based on the Noma Award-winning novel by Marlene van Niekerk. Starring: Lionel Newton, Vanessa Cooke, Obed Baloyi, Eduan van Jaarsveldt. “Best South African Film” DIFF; “Best Actor” Tariffa; London International Festival; Pusan International Film Festival.

== Books ==
- Black Fire! Accounts of the guerilla war in Rhodesia, with an introduction by James Baldwin. 1978, J. Friedmann, London. US title We Are Everywhere, New York: Random House Inc, 1979. Zimbabwe Publishing House, 1981.
- JIT, Anvil Press, 1991/Kaleidoscope, 1994. Novel about a young man from an African village trying to make his mark in the big city.
- Night Of The Fireflies, David Philip, 2006. M-Net Literary Award. While searching for his lover in war-torn Mozambique, a confused stranger meets a charismatic but dangerous medium who changes his life.

== Retrospectives ==
- 2010: Musée Dapper, Paris
- 2011: Festival de Douarnenez, France
- 2012: Museum of Cinema, Munich
- 2014: Jeu de Paume Museum, Paris
