= Don't Let's Go to the Dogs Tonight (film) =

2024 drama film by Embeth Davidtz

- United States theatrical release poster
- Directed by: Embeth Davidtz
- Screenplay by: Embeth Davidtz
- Based on: Don't Let's Go to the Dogs Tonight by Alexandra Fuller
- Produced by: Helena Spring; Paul Buys; Embeth Davidtz
- Starring: Lexi Venter; Embeth Davidtz; Zikhona Bali; Fumani Shilubana; Rob Van Vuuren; Anina Reed
- Cinematography: Willie Nel
- Edited by: Nicholas Costaras
- Music by: Chris Letcher
- Production company: Rose and Oaks Media
- Distributed by: Filmfinity
- Release dates: 30 August 2024 (Telluride); 25 July 2025 (South Africa)
- Running time: 100 minutes
- Country: South Africa
- Languages: English; Shona
- Budget: $1.4 million
- Box office: $832,534

Don't Let's Go to the Dogs Tonight is a 2024 South African drama film written and directed by Embeth Davidtz in her feature directorial debut. The film is based on Alexandra Fuller's 2001 memoir about the experiences of her White Zimbabwean family following the Rhodesian Bush War. The film premiered at the Telluride Film Festival on 30 August 2024, and was also screened as part of the Gala Presentation at the Toronto International Film Festival on 6 September 2024.

== Cast ==
- Lexi Venter as Alexandra "Bobo" Fuller
- Embeth Davidtz as Nicola Fuller
- Zikhona Bali as Sarah
- Fumani Shilubana as Jacob
- Rob van Vuuren as Tim Fuller
- Anina Reed as Vanessa Fuller
- Ilana Cilliers as Jilly

== Production ==
The production obtained an interim agreement with SAG-AFTRA to continue work on Don't Let's Go to the Dogs Tonight amidst the 2023 SAG-AFTRA strike.

== Release ==
Don't Let's Go to the Dogs Tonight had its world premiere at the Telluride Film Festival on 30 August 2024. It was also screened as a Gala Presentation at the Toronto International Film Festival on 6 September 2024. On 26 September, Sony Pictures Classics acquired worldwide distribution rights to the film. The film was released in South Africa on 25 July 2025.

== Reception ==
On the review aggregator website Rotten Tomatoes, 91% of 66 critics' reviews are positive, with an average rating of 7.4/10. The website's consensus reads: "Tackling thorny themes with fierce intelligence and a wonderful performance by Lexi Venter, Don't Let's Go to the Dogs Tonight is a striking feature debut from writer-director & co-star, Embeth Davidtz." Metacritic, which uses a weighted average, assigned the film a score of 74 out of 100, based on 16 critics, indicating "generally favorable" reviews.
