= Triomf (film) =

- Directed by: Michael Raeburn
- Screenplay by: Michael Raeburn, Malcolm Kohll (Adaptation from the novel by Marlene van Niekerk)
- Produced by: Giraffe Creations, G.H. Films
- Starring: Lionel Newton, Obed Baloyi, Eduan Van Jaarsveldt, Paul Luckhoff, Vanessa Cook, Pam Andrews
- Cinematography: Jamie Ramsay
- Edited by: Marie Quinton
- Music by: Philip Miller
- Release date: 2008
- Running time: 123 minutes
- Countries: France; South Africa

Triomf is a 2008 film based on the 1994 novel by Marlene van Niekerk.

== Synopsis ==
On the eve of elections in the newly democratic South Africa, the whole country is restless. In the poor white neighbourhood of Triomf, built on the ruins of the legendary Sophiatown, the Benade family is part of that white marginalized class, rarely shown in South African cinema. Father, mother, the son with learning disabilities and uncle Treppie share a decaying house surrounded by promiscuity. Worried about the result of the elections, they plan to escape to the North.

== Awards ==
- Durban International Film Festival 2008 (Sudáfrica) "Best South African Film".
- TARIFA, Spain - Lionel Newton "Best Actor".
