= Mduduzi Mabaso =

South African actor (born 1975)

- Born: Mduduzi Mabaso; 28 June 1975 (age 51); Alexandra, South Africa
- Occupation: Actor
- Years active: 1992–present
- Spouses: Veronica Maseko (divorced) Fatima Metsileng (m. 2009)
- Children: 4
- Awards: 2

Mduduzi Mabaso (born 28 June 1975) is a South African actor. He is best known for the roles in the films and teleserials Blood Diamond, Machine Gun Preacher and Hotel Rwanda.

== Personal life ==
He was born in 1975 in Alexandra, South Africa. He spent 3 years of his childhood in Transkei.

He was previously married to Veronica Maseko and the couple had two children. He is currently married to fellow actress, Fatima Metsileng. Mabaso met her during the set of the second season of Zone 14 in 2007. They later got married and have two children. He has four children: Ntokozo, Mpumi, Njabulo and Zolile.

== Career ==
In 1992, he first appeared in a theater production Divide and Rule. In 2004, he made his film debut with the American film Hotel Rwanda directed by Terry George. The film was based on the Rwandan genocide, which occurred during the spring of 1994. Then he acted in many supporting roles in the films, Catch a Fire, Heartlines and Blood Diamond. He also acted in the stage plays: Cry The Beloved Country, Madiba’s Magic, Behind the Curtains, Shaka Zulu and Tasha On The Rocks.

In 2006, he played the lead role in the short Sekalli le Meokgo directed by Tebho Mahlatsi. The film was later awarded Best Short Film at the 2007 Durban International Film Festival.

In 2007, he was invited to play in the lead character of the South African television soap opera Rhythm City. He played the role of Suffocate Ndlovu. The soapie made its premier on free-to-air television channel e.tv on 9 July 2007. In 2015 he also modelled at Soweto Fashion Week runway for fashion designer Floyd Avenue. The serial is continuously airing in South Africa with positive critical reviews. Meanwhile, Mabaso won the Golden Horn Award for Best Supporting Actor in a TV Soap and then Golden Horn Award for Best Actor in a Feature Film for his role as Ndlovu in the serial.

== Filmography ==
| Year | Film | Role | Genre | Ref. |
|---|---|---|---|---|
| 2004 | Hotel Rwanda | Hutu Lieutenant | Film | |
| 2006 | Catch a Fire | Security Branch Policeman | Film | |
| 2006 | Sekalli le Meokgo | Khotso | Short film | |
| 2006 | Heartlines | Manyisa | Film | |
| 2006 | Blood Diamond | Rebel 1 | Film | |
| 2006 | A Place Called Home | Steven | TV series | |
| 2007–2021 | Rhythm City | Suffocate Ndlovu | TV series | |
| 2011 | Machine Gun Preacher | Marco | Film | |
| 2011 | Lucky | Bongile | Film | |
| 2014 | Security | Morris | Short film | |
| 2016 | For Love and Broken Bones | Motheo | Film | |
| 2017 | Five Fingers for Marseilles | Luyanda | Film | |
| TBD | State Enemy No.1 | Collen Chauke | Film | |
| 2021 - 2023 | DiepCity | Elliot Mgedeza | TV Series | |
| 2024 | Queendom | Prince Andile Khahlamba | TV Series | |
| 2024 | House of Zwide | Msizi | TV Series | |

== See also ==
- South African Film and Television Awards
- 2018 DStv Mzansi Viewers' Choice Awards
