= Sekalli le Meokgo =

- Directed by: Teboho Mahlatsi
- Screenplay by: Teboho Mahlatsi
- Starring: Mduduzi Mabaso, Terry Pheto
- Cinematography: Robert Malpage
- Edited by: Andrew Trail
- Music by: Phillip Miller
- Production company: Bomb
- Release date: 2006
- Running time: 19'
- Country: South Africa

Sekalli le Meokgo (English: Meokgo and the Stickfighter) is a 2006 South African drama short film written and directed by Tebho Mahlatsi, starring Mduduzi Mabaso, and Terry Pheto, and with music by Phillip Miller.

== Synopsis ==
Kgotso, a musician and stickfighter who lives in the mountains of Lesotho, only comes out of his seclusion when the shepherds call on him to protect their sheep from thieves. On one such a mission, he is captivated by the beauty of a young woman who stares at him while he plays his concertina. This a story about love and death infused with both the cruelty and the beauty of African magic.

== Award ==
Sekalli le Meokga was awarded Best Short Film at the 2007 Durban International Film Festival.
