= Giyani: Land of Blood =

South African TV drama series

- Genre: Drama
- Written by: Phathutshedzo Makwarela; Gwydion Beynon
- Starring: Fumani Shilubana; Linah Ebony Ngcobo; Wiseman Zitha; Candy Tsa Mandebele; Obed Baloyi; Yvonne Chaka Chaka; Ndivhuho Mutsila; Mathabo Bila; Charles Baloyi; Nyeleti Khoza; Glennis Mabuza; Rami Chuene; Noel Ntshuxeko Baloyi; Themba Hlongwane; Lesley Khoza; Maduvha Madima
- Theme music composer: Thomas Chauke and the Shinyori Sisters
- Country of origin: South Africa

Production
- Running time: 30 minutes
- Production company: Tshedza Pictures

Original release
- Network: SABC 2
- Release: 1 April 2019 – 8 November 2023

Giyani: Land of Blood is a South African telenovela drama series created by Tshedza Pictures. It is the very first Xitsonga drama series made since the advent of Television in South Africa. It began airing on 1 April 2019 on SABC 2. Season 2 began airing on the 1st of November 2021, on SABC 2 from 21:30 to 22:00 pm. Season 3 aired from 13 March 2023 till 8 November 2023 Mon-Wed 21:30.

== Plot ==
Season 1 During apartheid, a piece of land had been allocated to the Van Reenen family who made their wealth by starting a banana plantation which worked with major supermarkets in South Africa.

Now in the present, the land reclaimed by the community after a successful restitution claim, and is renamed Tiakeni (Build Yourselves) as a memento to the perseverance of the fictional Risinga community and success in taking back their land. The series focuses on a feud between the Baloyi and the Mudau families.

According to Tshedza Pictures, The series brings to life the ageless themes of love rivalries, forbidden passion, stolen land and corruption.

== Season 2 plot ==
Two years later Richard Mudau (Nduvhuho Mutsila) got out of prison after he got arrested for fraud but he got out poor and he met this wonderful women Manoko Ledwaba (Rami Chuene). Khensani(Mathabo Mothibe) who is Richard's daughter moved to Joburg and she got in love with a Zulu guy Fezile(Senzo Radebe). Musa(Wiseman Zitha) who is Khensani's ex married to Tiyiselani (Nyeleti Khoza) who later got killed by Manoko. Mhani Tsakani (Linah Ebony Ngcobo) became a chef and Mhani Dayina (Candy Tsa Mandebele) continued to be a shebeen queen. Manoko pretends to be innocent but she is not what they think she is. She is working with Vukosi Moyo Fumani Shilubana), who is up to no good.

== Cast season 2 ==
Actors	Characters	Seasons	
Actors	Characters	1	2
Rami Chuene	Manoko Ledwaba		Main
Mathabo Bila	Khensani Mudau	Main	Main
Ndivuho Mutsila	Richard Mudau	Main	Main
Wiseman Zitha	Musawahosi Baloyi	Main	Main
Linah Ebony Ngcobo	Mhani Tsakani Baloyi	Main	Main
Charles Baloyi	Mike Gezani Baloyi	Main	Main
Nuel Ntshuxeko Baloyi	Mahlori Baloyi	Recurring	Main
Candy Tsa Mandebele	Mhani Dayina Homu	Main	Main
Glennis Mabuza	Kokwani Chavalala	Main	Main
Fumani N Shilubana	Vukosi Moyo	Main	Main
Themba Hlongwane	Bhuti Jonny Homu	Main	Main
Lesly Khoza	Collen Bila	Recurring	Main
Elvis Nkosi	Mahlatse Ledwaba		Guest
Obed Baloyi	Hlengani Chavalala	Main	Recurring
Madhuvha Madima	Shonisani Mudau		Recurring

== Characters ==
=== The Baloyis ===
- Musawahosi "Musa" Baloyi (Wiseman Zitha)

Eldest son of Mike and Tsakani Baloyi. Although there was little money to further his studies, his mother paid an enrolment fee, thus he followed his passion to be a lawyer at the University of Limpopo. He now runs a small firm along with his friend, Tiyiselani. His life is thrown off-balance when he finds out the government has allocated the rights to curator the reclaimed farm to Richard Mudau, a former MK and former cabinet minister, who is accused of corruption, He plans to stop the man from swindling his community.

- Gezani Mike Baloyi - "Bra Mike" (Charles Baloyi)

An MK veteran who was once friends with Richard Mudau

- Thulare Tsakani Baloyi (Linah "Ebony" Ngcobo)

Mike's devoted wife who has loved him since she was 16. She previously worked in the banana plantation to be able to put food on the table, while Mike drank himself to a stupor.

- Mahlori "Pero" Baloyi (Noel Ntshuxeko)

Tsakane and Mike's youngest child and the “born free” who scoffs at anything related to apartheid.

=== The Mudaus ===
- Sello Richard Mudau (Ndivhuho Mutsila)

An MK veteran who met Mike Baloyi and his then girlfriend Gladys Chavalala. He is painted by the community as their saving grace but deep down he is a swindler.

- Tutu Gladys Mudau (Yvonne Chaka Chaka)

Richard's wife. They skipped the country to join MK in Maputo, where Gladys and Mike met Richard. She is a selfish, greedy and ruthless woman driven by the need for more.She later got killed by her friend Nthath Moshesh

- Manoko Ledwaba (Rami Chuene)

Richard's second wife after his wife died .She is a criminal and owns a game lodge.She kills rhinos and sell the horns.She has a g-- stepson Mahlatse and she is pretending holier than thour

- Khensani Mudau (Mathabo Mothibe)

Daughter of Richard and Gladys. She wants to please her father not knowing that she is being used as a pawn in her father's deadly game of greed. She has a love interest in Musa Baloyi

Mahlatse (Elvis Nkosi)

He is manoko's greedy g-- son and he thinks he charms.

=== The Chavalalas ===
- Hlengani Joseph Chavalala (Obed Baloyi)

Gladys's older brother and Richard's brother-in-law whose dream is thwarted when Richard hired his own daughter Khensani instead.

- Ringani Ruth Chavalala (Susan Maeko)

Hlengani's long-suffering devout Christian wife who hopes that one-day God will soften her husband's bitterness.

- Kokwana Chavalala (Glennis Mabuza)

Gladys and Hlengani's mother - Richard's mother-in-law. A pensioner, who once worked on the plantation.

=== Other characters ===
- Vukosi Moyo (Fumani N Shilubana)

The Municipality Ward Councillor of Giyani. Richard's right-hand man, who fancies himself as more powerful than he actually is.

- Tiyiselani Mabasa (Nyelethi Khoza)

Childhood friend and partner of the law firm with Musa.

- Johnny Risenga Homu (Themba Hlongwane)

Previous foreman of the banana plantation

- Dayina Topisa Homu (Candy TsaMandebele Mokwena)

Shebeen Queen and Johnny's wife known for her sharp tongue.

- Matimba ( Hlamalani Akeelah Zinhle Mavasa)

Vukosi' PA. A loyal- worker to Vukosi. She threatens to reveal Musa and Khensani secrets lover affairs to Vukosi.

- Cawuke (Siphosethu Sihlangu)

Vukosi's assistant. A family man with morals. He threatens to reveal Richard and Vukosi's secret.
