= DiepCity =

South African TV series

- Genre: Drama; Soap
- Created by: Mandla N; Phathutshedzo Makwarela; Mpumelelo Nthlapo
- Starring: Nozuko Ntshangase; Mduduzi Mabaso; Kgaogelo Monama; Nompumelelo Vilakazi; Zikhona Bali; Dawn Thandeka King; Hamilton Dhlamini; Obed Baloyi; Vele Manenje; Crispen Nyathi; Luyanda Shezi; Lebohang Mpyani; Moshine Mametja; Nkululeko Mashinini
- Country of origin: South Africa
- Original language: Multilingual (Subtitles included)
- No. of seasons: 2
- No. of episodes: 500

Original release
- Network: Mzansi Magic
- Release: April 5, 2021 – March 3, 2023

Related
- Isibaya

DiepCity is a South African TV series created by Mandla N, Phathutshedzo Makwarela & Mpumelelo Nthlapo. It first aired on the 5 April 2021. The show was cancelled on 3 March 2023 after 240 episodes.

== Plot ==
Four poor girls live in Diepsloot, trying to make a living ending in crime with their master Elliot Mgedeza (Mduduzi Mabaso). When a heist goes wrong, Nokuthula "Nox" Jele's (Nozuko Ncayiyane) brother Sbusiso Jele (Tshiamo Molobi) gets killed. She was imprisoned for 5 years.

== Cast ==
Actors	Characters	Seasons	
Actors	Characters	1	2
Nozuko Ncayiyane	Nokuthula "Nox" Jele	Main	Main
Kgaogelo Monama	Lerato Mgedeza	Main	Main
Nompumelelo Vilakazi	Snenhlanhla "Sne"	Main	Main
Zikhona Bali	Asanda "Asa" Mdlalane	Main	Main
Mduduzi Mabaso	Elliot Mgedeza	Main	Main
Dawn Thandeka King	Thandiwe Jele	Main	Main
Hamilton Dlamini	Bonga Jele	Main	Main
Obed Baloyi	Ringtone "Ringo"	Main	Main
Lebohang Mpyana	Khelina "Khelz"	Main	Main
Chrispen Nyathi	Charleston	Recurring	Main
Moshine Mametja	Aus'Mary	Recurring	Main
Nkululeko Mashinini	Snethemba	Recurring	Main
Phindile Thango	Officer Ntswaki		Recurring

=== Awards and nominations ===
Year	Award	Category	Nominee(s)	Result	Ref.
2022	South African Film and Television Awards	Best Telenovela		Won	
2022	South African Film and Television Awards	Best Achievement in Directing - Telenovela	Mandla Ngcongwane; Manqoba Mathunjwa; Thandokazi Msumza	Won	
2022	South African Film and Television Awards	Best Achievement in Make-up and Hairstyling - TV Soap/Telenovela	Refentse Munyai	Won	
2022	South African Film and Television Awards	Best Achievement in Art Direction - TV Soap/Telenovela		Won	
2022	South African Film and Television Awards	Best Supporting Actor - Telenovela	Obed Baloyi	Nominated	
2022	South African Film and Television Awards	Best Achievement in Cinematography - Telenovela	Rangwetsane Maphika; Tiyane Nyembe	Nominated	
2022	South African Film and Television Awards	Best Achievement in Scriptwriting - Telenovela	Duduzile Zamantungwa Mabaso; Mandla Ngcongwane	Nominated	
2022	South African Film and Television Awards	Best Achievement in Editing - TV Soap/Telenovela	Mzwakhe Dhlamini	Nominated	
