= Wiseman Zitha =

South African actor and model (born 1995)

- Born: Wiseman Zitha; 30 December 1995 (age 30); Giyani, Limpopo, South Africa
- Education: Tshwane University of Technology
- Occupations: Actor; model; content creator
- Years active: 2019–present

Wiseman Zitha (born 30 December 1995) is a South African actor, model and content creator. He is best known for his lead roles in SABC 2 telenovela Giyani: Land of Blood as Musawahosi and Mzansi Magic drama series Queen Modjadji as Mamaila.

== Life and career ==
Zitha was born in Giyani, Limpopo, South Africa to a Tsonga and Venda family. He went to Tshwane University of Technology where he obtained a degree specialising in Drama.

Zitha began his career in 2019 where he made his first television debut in SABC 2 Xitsonga telenovela Giyani: Land of Blood playing the lead role of Musawahosi Baloyi. He the rose to prominence and upgraded his career in 2020 where he landed the recurring role in Muvhango. That year, he played the role of Mondli in The River season 3 and short series Sphinx as Lehasa. He appeared in BET Africa original telenovela Redemption as Clement in 2022.

In 2023, Zitha played the supporting in a 1Magic drama series Entangled season 2 as Sbu. The following year in 2024, he played the role of Takalani in Showmax film Muswangwe. By June, he begged the main role of Mamaila in Mzansi Magic Khilobedu cultural and historical television series Queen Modjadji season 1. He appeared in Netflix telenovela Blood Legacy as Lungelo Blanco.

== Filmography ==
=== Television ===
Year	Title	Role	Notes
2019	Giyani: Land of Blood	Mosawahosi Baloyi	Lead role, season 1 & 2
2020	The Sphinx	Lehasa	Main role, short series
2020	Muvhango	Ndemezo	Recurring role
2020	The River	Mondli	Recurring role, season 3
2022	Redemption	Clement	Recurring role, season 1
2023	Entangled	Sbu	Supporting role, season 2
2024	Queen Modjadji	Mamaila	Main role, season 1
2024	Blood Legacy	Lungelo Blanco	Starring role

=== Film ===
Year	Title	Role	Notes
2024	Muswangwe	Takalani	Lead role

== Awards and nominations ==
Year	Association	Category	Nominated works	Result	Ref.
2021	Feather Awards	Hunk of the Year	Himself	Won	
2024	GQ South Africa	Men of the Year	Himself	Won	
2024	Zikomo Awards	Best Supporting Actor	As Blanco on Blood Legacy	Won	
2024	Zikomo Awards	Best Young Achiever of the Year	Himself	Won	
2024	Zikomo Awards	Best Actor of the Year	Himself	Nominated	
2024	Content Creator Awards	Thumb Stopping	Himself	Nominated	
2026	African Choice Awards	Male TV Star of the Year	Himself	Pending	
