= Jit (film) =

- Directed by: Michael Raeburn
- Written by: Michael Raeburn
- Produced by: Rory Kilalea
- Starring: Dominic Makuvachuma, Sibongile Nene, Oliver Mtukudzi
- Cinematography: Joao Funcho Costa
- Edited by: Justin Krish
- Music by: Bhundu Boys, Thomas Mapfumo, Ilanga, Lovemore Majaivana, Oliver Mtukudzi
- Production companies: FilmAfrica/Gavin Films, London
- Distributed by: Les Films de l'Atalante, Northern Arts Entertainment
- Release date: 1990 (Zimbabwe)
- Running time: 98 minutes
- Country: Zimbabwe
- Language: English

Jit is a Zimbabwean film made in 1990, written and directed by Michael Raeburn.

Much of the film is set in the beer garden at the Queens Hotel in Harare, which at the time was the epicenter of the style of popular Zimbabwean dance music called jit, also known as jit-jive, from which the movie takes its name. Certain aspects of the film satirize Shona beliefs, including the jukwa's incessant craving for beer. Jit was the first Zimbabwean feature film to attract international attention and be enthusiastically received by local audiences. Upon its release the film played to full houses for two months. According to Raeburn, the film "explores the conflict between rural and urban life and it celebrates determination."

== Plot ==
It is about a young man, nicknamed UK, who lives in Harare with his musician uncle, Oliver Mtukudzi, who plays himself. UK is knocked out when he falls out of a taxicab and then falls in love with the woman he gazes up at when he regains consciousness. He determines that he must marry her, but her father insists on a "bride price" in the form of an expensive stereo and cash. UK sets out to obtain these things, but has to appease his jukwa (ancestral spirit), who is visible only to him and wants him to give her beer and earn money to send to his parents in the countryside.
