= Don't Let's Go to the Dogs Tonight =

Memoir of Alexandra Fuller

Don't Let's Go to the Dogs Tonight, a memoir of life with Alexandra Fuller and her family on a farm in Rhodesia (now Zimbabwe.) After the Rhodesian Bush War ended in 1980, the Fullers moved to Malawi, and then to Zambia. Don't Let's Go to the Dogs Tonight won the Winifred Holtby Memorial Prize in 2002, was a New York Times Notable Book for 2002 and a finalist for The Guardian's First Book Award, an award given to the best regional novel of the year.

== Awards ==
- 2002 Winifred Holtby Memorial Prize
- 2002 Booksense best non-fiction book
- 2004 Ulysses Prize for Art of Reportage

== Film adaptation ==
A 2024 film adaptation of the memoir starring Embeth Davidtz, who also wrote and directed, was selected to screen as a Gala Presentation at the 2024 Toronto International Film Festival.
