= Makoma Mohale =

South African actress (born 1996)

- Born: Makoma Mohale; 20 October 1996 (age 29); Mokopane, Limpopo, South Africa
- Other name: Komie
- Occupations: Actress; model; director; scriptwriter
- Notable work: Scandal!; Queen Modjadji

Makoma Mohale (born 20 October 1996) is a South African actress, model, director and scriptwriter. She is best known playing lead roles in E.tv soapie opera Scandal! as Tlhogi and Mzansi Magic cultural drama Queen Modjadji as Maselekwane.

== Life and career ==
She was born and raised in Mokopane, Limpopo, South Africa living with her grandmother and moved to Pretoria with her parents. After completing high school, she enrolled at the Tshwane University of Technology to study performing arts and also completed practical training at Breytenbach Theatre in Pretoria.

Mohale made her television debut in a supporting role on a popular South African telenovela The River as a recurring role and made first performances in theatres based in plays such as Too Sweet Too Bad, Fright Alah, and The Infidel. She rose to prominence in 2021 when she played the starring role of Tlhogi on E.tv soap opera Scandal!, consistently earning praise from audiences for her depth and presence on screen.

In 2024, Mohale landed her first major lead role in the historical drama Queen Modjadji, where she portrays Maselekwani, the young Rain Queen destined to bring peace and prosperity to her land. She won SA Style Award for The Next Big Thing under Actress in 2025.
