= Embeth Davidtz =

American and South African actress (born 1965)

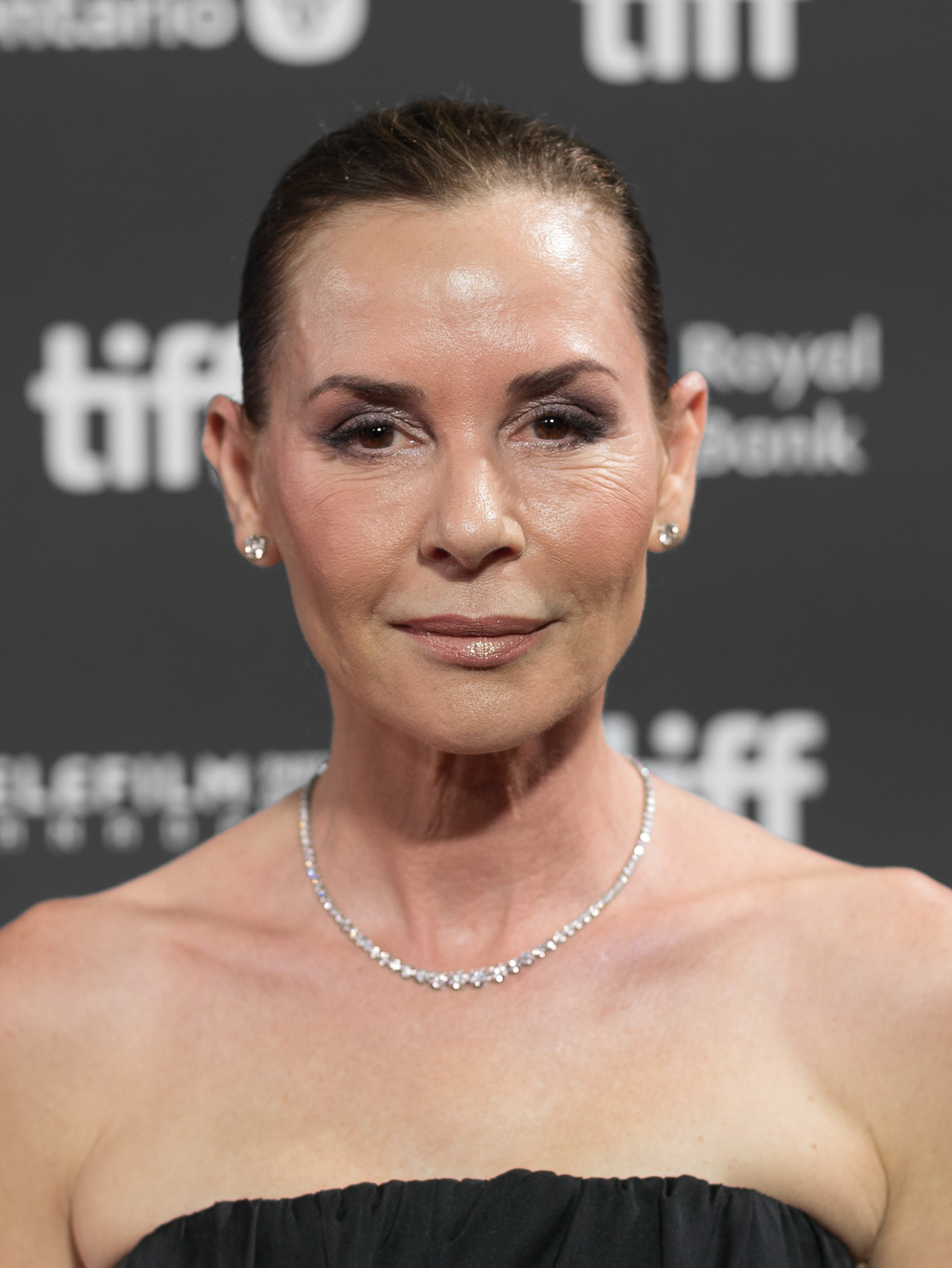
- Davidtz at the 2024 Toronto International Film Festival
- Born: Embeth Jean Davidtz; August 11, 1965 (age 61); Lafayette, Indiana, U.S.
- Citizenship: United States; South Africa
- Education: Rhodes University in Grahamstown
- Occupations: Actress; director; producer
- Years active: 1989–present
- Spouse: Jason Sloane (m. 2002)
- Children: 2

Embeth Jean Davidtz (born August 11, 1965) is an American and South African actress and director. She has appeared in movies such as Army of Darkness, Schindler's List, Matilda, Bridget Jones's Diary, and The Amazing Spider-Man, and in the television series In Treatment, Californication, and Mad Men.

In 2024, Davidtz made her directorial debut with Don't Let's Go to the Dogs Tonight, an adaptation of the best-selling memoir of the same name by Alexandra Fuller about growing up on a farm in Rhodesia, now Zimbabwe. The film had its Canadian premiere at the 2024 Toronto International Film Festival (TIFF).

== Early life ==
Davidtz was born on August 11, 1965, in Lafayette, Indiana, to South African parents John and Jean Davidtz, while John was studying chemical engineering at Purdue University. The family later moved to Trenton, New Jersey, and then to South Africa when Davidtz was nine years old. She has Dutch, English, and French ancestry. Davidtz had to learn Afrikaans before attending school classes in South Africa, where John took up a teaching post at Potchefstroom University. Davidtz graduated from The Glen High School in Pretoria in 1983 and studied at Rhodes University in Grahamstown.

== Career ==
=== Debut and early career ===
Davidtz made her acting debut at age 21 with CAPAB (Cape Performing Arts Board, now known as Artscape) in Cape Town, playing Juliet in a stage production of Romeo and Juliet at the Maynardville Open-Air Theatre. Performing in English and Afrikaans, Davidtz also starred in other local plays, including Stille Nag (Silent Night) and A Chain of Voices, both earning her nominations for the South African equivalent of the Tony Award.

Her film debut came in 1988 with a small role in South African-filmed American horror Mutator. Shortly afterwards, Davidtz won a bigger part in South African short telemovie A Private Life, as the daughter of an interracial couple. She also won a DALRO Award for Best Supporting Actress for her work in the 1990 play Houd-den-bek. For the same play, Davidtz was nominated in 1991 for the Esther Roos Award for Best Actress in a Supporting role in Afrikaans film. Steven Spielberg noticed her performance in the 1992 South African film, Nag van die Negentiende and offered her the role of Helen Hirsch in Schindler's List.

=== Hollywood career ===
In 1992, Davidtz played the part of Sheila in Sam Raimi's Army of Darkness alongside Bruce Campbell as Ash Williams. The third entry in the Evil Dead franchise would eventually become a cult classic worldwide.

In 1993, Davidtz played the role of Helen Hirsch in Steven Spielberg's Schindler's List. Two years later, she had a central role in the fact-based film Murder in the First, and the Merchant Ivory Productions Feast of July. In 1996, Davidtz played the role of Miss Honey, the first-grade teacher of the title character, in Matilda.

In 1998, Davidtz played a theologian helping Denzel Washington crack a supernatural wave of crimes in the mystery drama Fallen and a femme fatale linked to Kenneth Branagh in Robert Altman's The Gingerbread Man. In 1999, Davidtz portrayed a 19th-century woman of the world in Patricia Rozema's reworking of the Jane Austen comedy Mansfield Park and played a dual role opposite Robin Williams in the futuristic fable Bicentennial Man.

A supporting role in the 2001 film Bridget Jones's Diary saw Davidtz play Natasha, a colleague and one of the love interests of Mark Darcy (Colin Firth). That year, she began her run on the CBS drama Citizen Baines, playing the daughter of a defeated United States Senate incumbent (James Cromwell) who is herself leaning towards a career in politics. Other roles included horror thrillers like 2001's Thirteen Ghosts alongside Tony Shalhoub. In 2002, she appeared in the Michael Hoffman drama The Emperor's Club.

In 2005, Davidtz played a character in Junebug, an outsider art dealer from Chicago brought to North Carolina to meet her husband's family for the first time. Davidtz also guest-starred on the ABC drama series Grey's Anatomy as Dr. Derek Shepherd's sister Nancy Shepherd in the Season 3 episode "Let the Angels Commit" and the season 15 episode "Good Shepherd". In 2008, she had a regular role on HBO's In Treatment as Amy, part of a fractious couple alongside Josh Charles's Jake.

Davidtz portrayed the unfaithful and unfortunate wife of Anthony Hopkins's character in the 2007 drama Fracture.

From 2009 to 2012, Davidtz played Rebecca Pryce, wife of Lane Pryce, in the AMC television show Mad Men. She also played Felicia Koons, the wife of the dean and the mother of Becca's best friend, Chelsea, on Showtime's Californication.

Davidtz played Annika Blomkvist in the 2011 English language version of The Girl with the Dragon Tattoo. She also appeared in the 2012 Spider-Man reboot The Amazing Spider-Man and its 2014 sequel The Amazing Spider-Man 2 as Mary Parker, Peter Parker's missing mother.

In 2016, Davidtz joined the cast of Ray Donovan (season 4) in the role of Sonia Kovitzky. From 2019 to 2021, she played Paige Kessler on The Morning Show, opposite Steve Carell (as Mitch Kessler), Jennifer Aniston, and Reese Witherspoon. She played the adult version of Maddox Cappa in Old in 2021, and Judith Sanders in Not Okay in 2022.

== Personal life ==
Davidtz married entertainment attorney Jason Sloane on June 22, 2002, and they have two children: Charlotte and Asher. They live in Los Angeles. Davidtz is a convert to Judaism, her husband's religion.

In 2013, Davidtz underwent chemotherapy, immunological treatment, lymph-node-removal surgery and a double mastectomy after being diagnosed with Stage-3 breast cancer. Davidtz rejected the use of a prosthetic as a substitute for her nipple during a nude scene in Ray Donovan, where Davidtz portrayed a character who was a breast-cancer survivor, choosing instead to incorporate her own partially reconstructed right breast into the storyline.

== Filmography ==
=== Film ===
| Year | Title | Role | Notes |
|---|---|---|---|
| 1989 | Mutator | Jennifer | |
| 1990 | Sweet Murder | Laurie Shannon | |
| 1991 | Nag van die 19de | Tessa | |
| 1992 | Army of Darkness | Sheila | |
| 1993 | Schindler's List | Helen Hirsch | |
| 1995 | Murder in the First | Mary McCasslin | |
| 1995 | Feast of July | Bella Ford | |
| 1996 | Matilda | Miss Jennifer Honey | |
| 1998 | Fallen | Gretta Milano | |
| 1998 | The Gingerbread Man | Mallory Doss | |
| 1999 | Simon Magus | Leah | |
| 1999 | Mansfield Park | Mary Crawford | |
| 1999 | Bicentennial Man | "Little Miss" Amanda Martin, Portia Charney | |
| 2001 | Bridget Jones's Diary | Natasha Glenville | |
| 2001 | The Hole | Dr. Philippa Horwood | |
| 2001 | Thir13en Ghosts | Kalina Oretzia | |
| 2002 | The Emperor's Club | Elizabeth | |
| 2005 | Junebug | Madeleine Johnsten | |
| 2007 | Fracture | Jennifer Crawford | |
| 2008 | Winged Creatures | Joan Laraby | |
| 2010 | 3 Backyards | The Actress | |
| 2011 | The Girl with the Dragon Tattoo | Annika Giannini | |
| 2012 | The Amazing Spider-Man | Mary Parker | |
| 2013 | Paranoia | Dr. Judith Bolton | |
| 2013 | Europa Report | Dr. Samantha Unger | |
| 2013 | Miracle Rising: South Africa | Herself | |
| 2014 | The Amazing Spider-Man 2 | Mary Parker | |
| 2021 | Old | Maddox Cappa (Adult) | |
| 2022 | Not Okay | Judith Sanders | |
| 2023 | Retribution | Heather Turner | |
| 2024 | Don't Let's Go to the Dogs Tonight | Nicola Fuller | Directorial debut |

=== Television ===
| Year | Title | Role | Notes |
|---|---|---|---|
| 1989 | Screen Two | Older Karen | Episode: "A Private Life" |
| 1992 | Till Death Us Do Part | Katherine Palliko | TV movie (US not UK where series originated) |
| 1992 | Deadly Matrimony | Dianne Masters | TV movie |
| 1997 | The Garden of Redemption | Adriana | TV movie |
| 1998 | Last Rites | Dr. Lauren Riggs | TV movie |
| 2001 | Citizen Baines | Ellen Baines Croland | 7 episodes |
| 2002 | Shackleton | Rosalind Chetwynd | TV miniseries |
| 2004 | Scrubs | Maddie | Episode: "My Tormented Mentor" |
| 2006, 2019 | Grey's Anatomy | Nancy Shepherd | Episodes: "Let the Angels Commit", "Good Shepherd" |
| 2008 | In Treatment | Amy | 8 episodes |
| 2009 | Californication | Felicia Koons | 10 episodes |
| 2009–2012 | Mad Men | Rebecca Pryce | 8 episodes |
| 2015 | The Secret Life of Marilyn Monroe | Natasha Lytess | TV miniseries |
| 2016 | Ray Donovan | Sonia Kovitzky | 7 episodes |
| 2019–2021 | The Morning Show | Paige Kessler | 3 episodes |
| 2021 | Love, Victor | Ms. Campbell | Episode: "Table for Four" |
| 2022 | Tales of the Walking Dead | Amanda | Episode: "Davon" |
