= Candy Tsa Mandebele =

South African singer, songwriter and actress

- Born: Candy Tsa Mandebele Mokwena; July 19, 1970 (age 56); Limpopo, South Africa
- Genres: Kwaito; Afropop; Gqom
- Occupations: Singer-songwriter; actress
- Instrument: Singing
- Years active: 1993–present
- Labels: Kalawa Jazmee Records; Sony Music

Candy Tsa Mandebele Mokwena (born June 19, 1970) is a South African singer, songwriter, actress. Born and raised in Limpopo, she began singing in her mother's community traditional group, Sekgapa, at the age of 14. Mandebele began her career in 1993 as a songwriter, prior to joining group Shaka Bundu Girls in 1995.

Mandebele is also well known for singing in Khelobedu language, which is a dialect of Northern Sotho language. In 2016, her debut solo album Siki (Five Cents) was released through Sony Music, The album was a critical success and generated the single "Baile".

== Life and career ==
=== 1970–1993: Early life and beginnings ===
Candy Tsa Mandebele Mokwena was born on July 19, 1970, in the province of Limpopo. Mandebele has three siblings, At the age of 14 Mokwena started performing as a soloist in her Mother's community traditional group Sekgapa choir (her mother was the group leader and also played the drum for the group), in the village of Ga- Sedibeni. Mandebele grew up without her biological father

Mandebele also attended public school in Limpopo, she did not receive formal schooling, she dropped out of school at grade nine. Candy launched her professional music career in 1993 as songwriter on Peter Teanet's double multi-platinum album, "Nwa'yingwani".

=== 1994–2007: Career beginnings, Shaka Bundu Girls, and Disband ===
In 1994, Candy and her friend Nurse Matlala moved to the city of Johannesburg to pursue music career, In late 1994, they met Papa Penny Penny, who helped them sign a record deal with Gallo Records, the duo co-wrote penny hit single "Shichangani-Lshilungu", while they were working on their debut single. In 1995, they launched their career as Shaka Bundu Girls, The group scored a hit with their single "Hona Mo SOO" which was later certified Platinum by RISA, Singles such as gold certified single "One Day" (1996) and "Hi July" in (1997) kept the band in the spotlight.

In 1999, after leaving Gallo Records, they started to freelance as session musician. In 2004, they joined Kalawa Jazmee Records, Oskido renamed the group to CandyNurse. While at Kalawa Records the duo helped in composition of some of the tracks in BOP's "Life Iskorokoro" album, they also provided backing vocals for the album. In 2007 the duo disbanded.

=== 2009–2017: Siki (Five Cents) and career breakthrough ===
In September 2010, her debut solo album, Siki (Five Cents), was released, it was released to positive reviews from music critics, and spawned the hit " Baile". The single earned Mandebele one nominations at the 2000 South African Music Awards. Throughout the years, Mandebele performed guest verses on several song, including "Nkatanga" by Selaelo Selota and Malatji, "Boloba Thaba" with Revolution, DJ Lucky, Lacosta's "Diteki" and "Khoma jive", Uhuru's "Nkirikiri", Dr Malinga's "Moshito" and Black Motion's "Maghoro".

After a four-year hiatus, On October 13, 2013, Mandebele released "Tsa Mandebele" song featuring Oskido and an accompanying music video on YouTube. The song became a 2013 hit and signature song for Tsa Mandebele.

=== 2017: Hupenyu Unenge Viri ===
In 2018, under her own label, Mandebele released "Nathinga" a single from her Hupenyu Unenge Viri (2018) album through Universal Music South Africa. The Xitsonga house track was written by Mandebele and produced by Molefi Modikoe. In an interview when she was asked about what the song was about, she said "The song was about a fictional person called Nathinga, who is eligible to and will get married in spite of the concern that people seem to have about her betrothal. The "Hupenyu Unenge Viri" album won two awards at the 2019 Limpopo Music Awards (LMA), Best Music Video (for song Nathinga) and Best Female.

On March 19, 2019, Mandebele starred in South Africa's first Xitsonga telenovela drama series Giyani: Land of Blood on SABC 2, which tells the story about two families locked in a bitter, decades-long squabble over a banana plantation which was recently given to the people of Risinga. She played the role of a flamboyant village shebeen queen Mhani Dayina in the telenovela, Her portrayal of Mhani received positive reviews, and she made history by becoming the first person to speak Khelobedu in a television series. The show ended on November 26, 2019.

Candy received four nominations at the 15th Annual South African Traditional Music Awards for Best Traditional Collaboration Song, Best Traditional Music Artist /Group Of The Year, Best Traditional House Music Song, Best Female Artist/Group.

== Personal life ==
Mandebele was a mother of one son Lesley. She became pregnant at the age of 17, and had to drop out of school, she then went to work at a tea farmer to support her son. In 2011, Candy lost her son Lesley Mokwena (1987–2011) in a car accident. In 2017, Mandebele was diagnosed with Type 2 diabetes

== Discography ==
=== Studio albums ===
- Siki (Five Cents) (2009)
- Easy Come Easy Go (2016)
- Hupenyu Unenge Viri (2018)
- Still Here (2020)
