= Obed Baloyi =

South African actor (born 1970)

- Born: 1970 (age 55–56); Diepkloof, South Africa
- Other name: Obed Baloi
- Years active: 1996–present
- Children: 4
- Awards: SAFTA

Obed Baloyi (born 1970) is a South African actor and playwright. He won a SAFTA for his performance as TsuTsuma in the sitcom Ga Re Dumele (2010–2019).

== Early life ==
Baloyi is from Diepkloof, Gauteng. He speaks Xitsonga natively as well as English, Zulu, and SeSotho. He attended Shingwezi High School in Malamulele where he first participated in drama productions. He helped out with his mother's food vending growing up. He joined the Melaisizwe theatre group. Upon returning to Johannesburg, Baloyi took acting classes at the Donaldson Orlando Cultural Club (DOCC) under the mentorship of actors such as Darlington Michaels.

== Career ==
In 1996, Baloyi formed the Mangava Drama Group. He wrote the play Ga-Mchangani, which was staged at the Market Theatre and then the Zwakala Festival. His next play Via Soweto premiered at the 1999 Barney Simon Young Directors and Playwrights Festival.

Baloyi turned his focus towards the screen in 2000, making his television debut in the second season of the educational youth show Soul Buddyz. He returned for its fourth season as well, this time playing Prins. He appeared in season 2 of A Place Called Home. He made his feature film debut in Triomf (2008), an adaptation of the 1994 novel by Marlene van Niekerk.

In 2010, Baloyi landed the role of TsuTsuma in Ga Re Dumele, a role he would play for all six seasons of the sitcom. For his performance, Baloyi was nominated twice for Best Actor in a TV Comedy at the South African Film and Television Awards, winning his latter nomination in 2014.

Baloyi starred in the first season of Giyani: Land of Blood on SABC 2 and returned for its second season, this time in a recurring role. From 2021 to 2022, Baloyi was in the main cast of the Mzansi Magic crime drama DiepCity as Ringo. For its second and final season, he was nominated for Best Supporting Actor in a Telenovela at the SAFTAs that year.

== Personal life ==
Baloyi has four children. He is a member of the Zion Christian Church.

== Filmography ==
=== Film ===
Year	Title	Role	Notes
2008	Triomf	Sonny	
2010	Jozi	Jao	
2013	Mandela: Long Walk to Freedom	Client	
2016	The Last Face	Atif	
2024	Lobola Man	Uncle Long John	

=== Television ===
Year	Title	Role	Notes
2002–2003; 2007	Soul Buddyz	Joe / Prins	Season 2, 4
2004	Yizo Yizo	Zwepe	Season 3
2005	Scandal!	Ezra	
2005	Mzee wa Two Six	Friend	Guest role
2006	Izoso Connexion	Chip Robber	Guest role
2006	Heartlines	Captain Hlatswayo	Anthology
2007–2010	Nomzamo	Mzizi	Seasons 2–3
2008	A Place Called Home	Blues	Season 2
2009	The Philanthropist	Native Man	Pilot
2010–2019	Ga Re Dumele	Tsutsuma	Main role
2011	Laugh Out Loud	Mashangane	
2011	Sokhulu & Partners	Sergeant	Season 2
2015	Majakathata	Dzunisani	Season 2
2015	eKasi: Our Stories	Sobantu	Season 6
2015–2016	High Rollers	Khan	
2018	Liberty	Morgan	Miniseries
2018	Isibaya	Mkongwane	Season 6
2019–2021	Giyani: Land of Blood	Hlengani Joseph Chavalala	Main role (season 1); Recurring role (season 2)
2021–2023	DiepCity	Ringo	Main role (season 1 - 2)
2026	Paradys	Patrick Shivambu	

== Stage ==
=== Writing credits ===
- Ga Mchangani (1996)
- Via Soweto (1999)

== Awards and nominations ==
Year	Award	Category	Work	Result	Ref.
2012	South African Film and Television Awards	Best Actor in a TV Comedy	Ga Re Dumele	Nominated	
2014	South African Film and Television Awards	Best Actor in a TV Comedy	Ga Re Dumele	Won	
2022	South African Film and Television Awards	Best Supporting Actor in a Telenovela	DiepCity	Nominated	
