= Alexandra Fuller =

British-Zimbabwean author (born 1969)

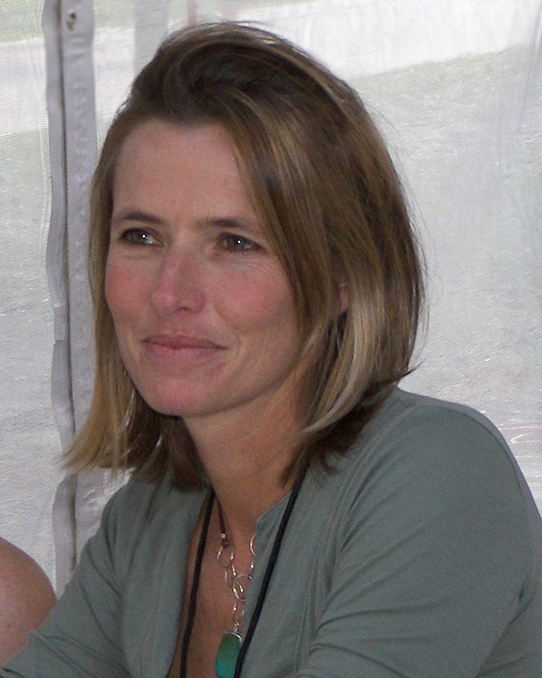
- Fuller in 2008
- Born: 1969 (age 56–57); Glossop, Derbyshire, England
- Occupation: Author
- Writing career
- Notable awards: 2002 Winifred Holtby Memorial Prize; 2002 Booksense best non-fiction book 2004 Ulysses Prize for Art of Reportage

Alexandra Fuller on Bookbits radio.

Alexandra Fuller (born 1969) is a British-Zimbabwean author. Her articles and reviews have appeared in The New Yorker, National Geographic, Granta, The New York Times, The Guardian and The Financial Times.

== Personal life ==
In 1972 Fuller moved with her family to Rhodesia (later Zimbabwe Rhodesia, now Zimbabwe). She was educated at boarding schools in Umtali and Salisbury (renamed Harare after 1982). She met her American husband, Charlie Ross, in Zambia, where he was running a rafting business for tourists. In 1994, they moved to his home state of Wyoming. Fuller and Ross divorced in 2012. They had two daughters and one son together. Their son, Fi, died in his sleep at the age of 21. She currently spends much of her time in a yurt near Jackson, Wyoming.

== Books ==
Her first book, Don't Let's Go to the Dogs Tonight, published in 2001, is a memoir of life with her family living in southern Africa. It won the Winifred Holtby Memorial Prize in 2002. In the same year it was featured in The New York Times list of "Notable Books" and a finalist for The Guardian's First Book Award. A sequel, Cocktail Hour Under the Tree of Forgetfulness about her mother, Nicola Fuller, was published in 2011.

Her 2004 book Scribbling the Cat, about war's repercussions, received the Lettre Ulysses Award for the Art of Reportage in 2005.

In her book The Legend of Colton H. Bryant (2008) Fuller narrates the short life of a Wyoming roughneck who fell to his death at age 25 in February 2006 on an oil rig owned by Patterson–UTI Energy.

The autobiographical Leaving Before the Rains Come, published in January 2015, is about the disintegration of Fuller's marriage.

Fuller published her first novel, Quiet Until the Thaw, in 2017.

In 2019 she published Travel Light, Move Fast about the death of her father and son.

In 2024 she published Fi: A Memoir of My Son, centres on her grief from losing her adult son.

== Education ==
Fuller received a B.A. from Acadia University in Nova Scotia, Canada. In 2007 she received an Honorary Doctorate of Letters from the same institution.

== Don't Let's Go to the Dogs Tonight ==
The memoir follows Fuller, called Bobo by her family, and her sister and parents as they move from England to Rhodesia and other points in Central Africa. The book mainly focuses on stories of family life while moving around Rhodesia (now Zimbabwe), Malawi and Zambia. The Rhodesian Bush War serves as a backdrop to the family's time in Rhodesia. After the war, the Fullers move to Malawi and then Zambia.

Fuller does not hide the effect her mother's alcoholism had on her childhood and is frank about her father's casual racism, and her parents' colonial attitude. Fuller writes about living through a war, being white while growing up in an almost all-black country, and the death of siblings and beloved animals.

== Works ==
- Cocktail Hour under the Tree of Forgetfulness, Waterville, Me.: Thorndike 2011. ISBN 9781410439413, OCLC 773423489
- Scribbling the Cat: Travels with an African Soldier, London: Picador, 2004. ISBN 9781447262534, OCLC 862092268
- Don't Let's Go to the Dogs Tonight: an African childhood, London: Picador, 2015. ISBN 9781447275084, OCLC 902723457
- Leaving Before the Rains Come. ULVERSCROFT, 2017. ISBN 9781785413049, OCLC 983282940
- Fuller, Alexandra (9 April 2024). Fi: A Memoir of My Son. Grove Press. ISBN 978-0-8021-6104-8.

== See also ==
- Whites in Zimbabwe
- British diaspora in Africa
